= State education agency =

A state education agency or state department of education is the state-level government organization within each U.S. state or territory responsible for education, including providing information, resources, and technical assistance on educational matters to schools and residents.

In all states but Hawaii, primary and secondary education (collectively known as K–12) are provided by school districts, while the state education agency handles only matters of statewide concern such as curriculum standards. In Hawaii and all inhabited federal territories, the state education agency or the equivalent territorial government agencies are responsible for directly operating primary and secondary schools.

States use different titles to refer to the executive of their state education agency, including; 34 states use one the two titles "Commissioner of Education" and "Superintendent of Public Instruction", and the remaining 16 use various combinations of secretary, superintendent, commissioner, or director; of education, public instruction, or schools. Twelve states choose the head of their education agency through an election, of which eight states hold partisan (Note: Partisan elections are held in Arizona, Georgia, Idaho, Montana, North Carolina, Oklahoma, South Carolina, and Wyoming.) and four states hold nonpartisan (Note: Nonpartisan elections are held in California, North Dakota, Washington, and Wisconsin.) elections. The 37 remaining states appoint their education agency executive, whether the appointment be done by the governor, state school board, legislature, or some combination of factors. (Note: While South Dakota does elect a position titled "Commissioner of School and Public Lands", the head of the department of education is a cabinet secretary appointed by the governor, which is the position detailed in this article.)

== State education agencies (SEAs) ==
The following are state education agencies as identified by the Council of Chief State School Officers.

State	State agency	Chief state school officer	Elected	Service began	Name
Alabama	Alabama Department of Education	Alabama Superintendent of Education	No	2018	Eric Mackey
Alaska	Alaska Department of Education & Early Development	Alaska Commissioner of Education & Early Development	No	2016	Michael Johnson
Arizona	Arizona Department of Education	Arizona Superintendent of Public Instruction	Yes	2023	Tom Horne
Arkansas	Arkansas Department of Education	Arkansas Commissioner of Education	No	2015	Johnny Key
California	California Department of Education	California Superintendent of Public Instruction	Yes	2019	Tony Thurmond
Colorado	Colorado Department of Education	Colorado Commissioner of Education	No	2016	Katy Anthes
Connecticut	Connecticut Department of Education	Connecticut Commissioner of Education	No	2021	Charlene Russell-Tucker
Delaware	Delaware Department of Education	Delaware Secretary of Education	No	2022	Mark Holodick
Florida	Florida Department of Education	Florida Commissioner of Education	No	2025	Anastasios Kamoutsas
Georgia	Georgia Department of Education	State Superintendent of Schools	Yes	2015	Richard Woods
Hawaii	Hawaii Department of Education	Hawaii Superintendent of Education	No	2021	Keith Hayashi
Idaho	Idaho State Department of Education	Idaho Superintendent of Public Instruction	Yes	2023	Debbie Critchfield
Illinois	Illinois State Board of Education	Illinois Superintendent of Education	No	2023	Tony Sanders
Indiana	Indiana Department of Education	Indiana Secretary of Education	No	2021	Katie Jenner
Iowa	Iowa Department of Education	Iowa Director of Education	No	2024	McKenzie Snow
Kansas	Kansas State Department of Education	Kansas Commissioner of Education	No	2015	Randy Watson
Kentucky	Kentucky Department of Education	Kentucky Commissioner of Education	No	2020	Jason Glass
Louisiana	Louisiana Department of Education	Louisiana Superintendent of Education	No	2020	Cade Brumley
Maine	Maine Department of Education	Maine Commissioner of Education	No	2019	Pender Makin
Maryland	Maryland State Department of Education	Maryland State Superintendent of Schools	No	2023	Carey Wright
Massachusetts	Massachusetts Department of Elementary and Secondary Education	Massachusetts Commissioner of Elementary and Secondary Education	No	2018	Jeffrey Riley
Michigan	Michigan Department of Education	Michigan Superintendent of Public Instruction	No	2019	Michael Rice
Minnesota	Minnesota Department of Education	Minnesota Commissioner of Education	No	2021	Heather Mueller
Mississippi	Mississippi Department of Education	Mississippi Superintendent of Education	No	2024	Lance Evans
Missouri	Missouri Department of Elementary and Secondary Education	Missouri Commissioner of Education	No	2019	Margie Vandeven
Montana	Montana Office of Public Instruction	Montana Superintendent of Public Instruction	Yes	2017	Elsie Arntzen
Nebraska	Nebraska Department of Education	Nebraska Commissioner of Education	No	2014	Matthew Blomstedt
Nevada	Nevada Department of Education	Nevada Superintendent of Public Instruction	No	2025	Victor Wakefield
New Hampshire	New Hampshire Department of Education	New Hampshire Commissioner of Education	No	2017	Frank Edelblut
New Jersey	New Jersey Department of Education	New Jersey Commissioner of Education	No	2024	Kevin Dehmer
New Mexico	New Mexico Public Education Department	New Mexico Secretary of Education	No	2022	Kurt Steinhaus
New York	New York State Education Department	New York State Commissioner of Education	No	2021	Betty Rosa
North Carolina	North Carolina Department of Public Instruction	North Carolina Superintendent of Public Instruction	Yes	2025	Mo Green
North Dakota	North Dakota Department of Public Instruction	North Dakota Superintendent of Public Instruction	Yes	2013	Kirsten Baesler
Ohio	Ohio Department of Education	Ohio Superintendent of Public Instruction	No	2023	Paul Craft
Oklahoma	Oklahoma State Department of Education	Oklahoma Superintendent of Public Instruction	Yes	2023	Ryan Walters
Oregon	Oregon Department of Education	Oregon Deputy Superintendent of Public Instruction (Note: Under state law, the governor of Oregon serves as the superintendent of public instruction ex officio, but the deputy superintendent is the director of the Oregon Department of Education.)	No	2023	Charlene Williams
Pennsylvania	Pennsylvania Department of Education	Pennsylvania Secretary of Education	No	2023	Khalid Mumin
Rhode Island	Rhode Island Department of Education	Rhode Island Commissioner of Education	No	2019	Angélica Infante-Green
South Carolina	South Carolina Department of Education	South Carolina Superintendent of Education	Yes	2015	Molly Spearman
South Dakota	South Dakota Department of Education	South Dakota Secretary of Education	No	2020	Tiffany Sanderson
Tennessee	Tennessee Department of Education	Tennessee Commissioner of Education	No	2023	Lizzette Gonzalez Reynolds
Texas	Texas Education Agency	Texas Commissioner of Education	No	2015	Mike Morath
Utah	Utah State Office of Education	Utah Superintendent of Public Instruction	No	2016	Sydnee Dickson
Vermont	Vermont Agency of Education	Vermont Secretary of Education	No	2024	Zoie Saunders
Virginia	Virginia Department of Education	Virginia Superintendent of Public Instruction	No	2023	Lisa Coons
Washington	Washington State Office of Superintendent of Public Instruction	Washington Superintendent of Public Instruction	Yes	2017	Chris Reykdal
West Virginia	West Virginia Department of Education	West Virginia State Superintendent of Schools	No	2023	Michele Blatt
Wisconsin	Wisconsin Department of Public Instruction	Wisconsin Superintendent of Public Instruction	Yes	2021	Jill Underly
Wyoming	Wyoming Department of Education	Wyoming Superintendent of Public Instruction	Yes	2022	Brian Schroeder
American Samoa	American Samoa Department of Education	American Samoa Director of Education	No	2021	Samasoni Asaeli
District of Columbia	District of Columbia Office of the State Superintendent of Education	District of Columbia Superintendent of Education	No	2021	Christina Grant
Guam	Guam Department of Education	Guam Superintendent of Education	No	2016	Jon Fernandez
Northern Mariana Islands	Commonwealth of the Northern Mariana Islands Public School System	CNMI Commissioner of Education	No	2019	Alfred Ada
Puerto Rico	Puerto Rico Department of Education	Puerto Rico Secretary of Education	No	2019	Eligio Hernández Pérez
U.S. Virgin Islands	U.S. Virgin Islands Department of Education	U.S. Virgin Islands Commissioner of Education	No	2019	Racquel Berry-Benjamin

== See also ==
- National Association of State Boards of Education, United States
- No Child Left Behind, United States federal law
- School district
- Standardized test
