= 2026 Michigan State Board of Education election =

- November 3, 2026

2 of 8 seats on the Michigan State Board of Education 5 seats needed for a majority
	First party	Second party
Party	Democratic	Republican
Seats before	6	2
Seats after	6	2
Seat change	Steady	Steady

The 2026 Michigan State Board of Education election was held on November 3, 2026, to elect two of eight members on the Michigan State Board of Education. Parties nominate candidates through conventions instead of in primary elections. Candidates are elected through plurality block voting.

== Democratic convention ==
=== Candidates ===
==== Nominees ====
- Judith Pritchett, incumbent board member (2019–present)
- Tiffany Tilley, incumbent board member (2019–present)

==== Eliminated at convention ====
- J. E. Windle

=== Endorsements ===
Judith Pritchett

Political parties

- Michigan Democratic Party
Tiffany Tilley

Political parties

- Michigan Democratic Party

== Republican convention ==
=== Candidates ===
==== Nominees ====
- Terence Collins, member of the Grosse Pointe school board and financial analyst
- Bree Moeggenberg, chair of the Isabella County chapter of Moms for Liberty and childcare provider

=== Endorsements ===
Terence Collins

Political parties

- Michigan Republican Party
Bree Moeggenberg

Political parties

- Michigan Republican Party

== Third-party candidates ==
=== Libertarian Party ===
==== Nominee ====
- Charles Essner

=== Green Party ===
==== Nominee ====
- Wissam Charafeddine

=== U.S. Taxpayers Party ===
==== Nominees ====
- William Mohr II, 2024 nominee for Wayne State University Board of Governors
- Christine Schwartz, perennial candidate

=== Natural Law Party ===
==== Nominee ====
- Kelli Monroe

=== Working Class Party ===
==== Nominee ====
- Mary Anne Hering, perennial candidate

== General election ==
=== Results ===
2026 Michigan State Board of Education election results (vote for not more than 2)
Party	Candidate	Votes	%
Democratic	Judith Pritchett (incumbent)	2,378,629	26.50
Democratic	Tiffany Tilley (incumbent)	2,353,182	26.21
Republican	Terence Collins	1,977,871	22.03
Republican	Bree Moeggenberg	1,928,689	21.48
Working Class	Mary Anne Hering	101,653	1.13
Libertarian	Charles Essner	77,609	0.86
U.S. Taxpayers	Christine Schwartz	54,390	0.61
Green	Wissam Charafeddine	42,184	0.47
U.S. Taxpayers	William Mohr II	40,109	0.45
Natural Law	Kelli Monroe	23,024	0.26
Write-in		11	0.00
Total votes		8,977,351	100.0
Democratic hold			
Democratic hold			

== See also ==
- 2026 Michigan elections
