= List of members of the Michigan State Board of Education =

The Michigan State Board of Education was created by an act the Michigan Legislature in 1849. The three initial members were appointed by the governor with the consent of the state Senate. The 1850 Michigan Constitution established the state board of education as having three members who served six-year terms. It also made members of the board elected, on a statewide basis. The first election was held in 1852. The 1908 state constitution expanded the board to four members. The 1963 state constitution extended the board further, to eight members serving eight-year terms.

The following list of members does not include ex officio members. On the initial board, the lieutenant governor and the state superintendent of public instruction were ex officio members. Under the 1850 and 1908 constitution, only the superintendent of public instruction was an ex officio member. Under the 1963 state constitution, the governor was made an ex officio member, in addition to the superintendent of public instruction.

== Current members ==
Members of the Michigan State Board of Education
Name	Start	Next Election	Party
Marshall Bullock, treasurer	December 22, 2022 (appointed)	2028	Democratic
Ellen Lipton, co-vice president	January 1, 2021	2028	Democratic
Tom McMillin	January 1, 2017	2032	Republican
Judith Pritchett, secretary	January 1, 2019	2026	Democratic
Pamela Pugh, president	January 1, 2015	2030	Democratic
Mitchell Robinson, NASBE delegate	January 1, 2023	2030	Democratic
Nikki Snyder	January 1, 2017	2032	Republican
Tiffany Tilley, co-vice president	January 1, 2019	2026	Democratic
Gretchen Whitmer, governor (ex officio)	January 1, 2019	2026	Democratic
Glenn Maleyko, superintendent (ex officio)	September 15, 2025	N/A	N/A

== List of members of the Michigan State Board of Education ==
Name	Term	Party / Appointer	Notes	Ref.
Samuel Newberry	1849–1850	Epaphroditus Ransom	Resigned	
Samuel Barstow	1849–1851	Epaphroditus Ransom		
Randolph Manning	1849–1850	Epaphroditus Ransom		
Isaac E. Crary	1850–1854	John S. Barry	Initially appointed, later elected in 1852	
Isaac E. Crary	1850–1854	Democratic	Died in office	
George N. Skinner	1850	John S. Barry	Died in office	
Elias M. Skinner	1850–1851	John S. Barry		
Consider A. Stacy	1851–1852	John S. Barry		
Chauncy Joslin	1851–1854	John S. Barry	Initially appointed, later elected in 1852	
Chauncy Joslin	1851–1854	Democratic		
Gideon O. Whittemore	1853–1856	Democratic	Resigned	
Hiram L. Miller	1854–1857	Republican	Elected to fill vacancy; resigned	
John R. Kellogg	1855–1860	Republican		
D. Bethune Duffield	1856	Kinsley S. Bingham	Appointed to fill vacancy	
Witter J. Baxter	1857–1881	Kinsley S. Bingham	Initially appointed to fill vacancy, later elected	
Witter J. Baxter	1857–1881	Republican	Resigned and re-elected in 1876; resigned in 1881	
George Willard	1857–1862	Republican		
Edwin Willits	1861–1872	Republican		
Daniel E. Brown	1863–1874	Republican	Died in office	
Edward Dorsch	1873–1878	Republican		
David P. Mayhew	1874	John J. Bagley	Appointed to fill vacancy	
Edgar Rexford	1875–1886	Republican		
George F. Edwards	1879–1884	Republican		
Bela W. Jenks	1881–1888	David Jerome	Initially appointed to fill vacancy, later elected	
Bela W. Jenks	1881–1888	Republican		
James M. Ballou	1885–1890	Republican		
Samuel S. Babcock	1887–1892	Republican		
Perry F. Powers	1889–1900	Republican		
David A. Hammond	1891–1896	Democratic	Resigned	
Eugene A. Wilson	1893–1898	Republican		
James W. Simmons	1896–1898	John T. Rich	Initially appointed to fill vacancy, later elected	
James W. Simmons	1896–1898	Republican	Resigned	
Elias F. Johnson	1898–1901	Hazen S. Pingree	Initially appointed to fill vacancy, later elected	
Elias F. Johnson	1898–1901	Republican	Resigned	
Frederick A. Platt	1899–1901	Republican	Resigned	
Lincoln Avery	1901	Aaron T. Bliss	Appointed to fill vacancy; resigned	
Luther L. Wright	1901–1907	Aaron T. Bliss	Initially appointed to fill vacancy, later elected	
Luther L. Wright	1901–1907	Republican	Resigned	
James H. Thompson	1901–1905	Republican	Resigned	
Patrick H. Kelley	1901–1905	Aaron T. Bliss	Initially appointed to fill vacancy, later elected	
Patrick H. Kelley	1901–1905	Republican	Resigned	
Edward C. Hinman	1905–1906	Fred M. Warner	Appointed to fill vacancy, resigned	
William J. McKone	1905–1915	Fred M. Warner	Initially appointed to fill vacancy, later elected	
William J. McKone	1905–1915	Republican		
Dexter M. Ferry Jr.	1906–1912	Fred M. Warner	Initially appointed to fill vacancy, later elected	
Dexter M. Ferry Jr.	1906–1912	Republican		
William A. Cotton	1907–1911	Fred M. Warner	Initially appointed to fill vacancy, later elected	
William A. Cotton	1907–1911	Republican	Resigned	
Thomas W. Nadal	1911–1917	Chase Osborn	Initially appointed to fill vacancy, later elected	
Thomas W. Nadal	1911–1917	Republican	Resigned	
Frank Cody	1913–1943	Republican	Resigned	
Frederick A. Jeffers	1915–1933	Republican		
Thomas E. Johnson	1917–1919	Albert Sleeper	Appointed to fill vacancy; resigned	
Allen M. Freeland	1919–1935	Albert Sleeper	Initially appointed to fill vacancy, later elected	
Allen M. Freeland	1919–1935	Republican		
Edna C. Wilson	1933–1939	Democratic		
Wynard Wichers	1935–1945	Republican	Resigned	
Mary F. Farnsworth	1939–1945	Republican		
Stephen S. Nisbet	1943–1961	Harry Kelly	Initially appointed to fill vacancy, later elected	
Stephen S. Nisbet	1943–1961	Republican		
Louisa I. Durham	1945–1953	Harry Kelly	Initially appointed to fill vacancy, later elected	
Louisa I. Durham	1945–1953	Republican		
Charles G. Burns	1945–1957	Republican		
Walter F. Greis	1953–1959	Republican		
Chris H. Magnusson	1957–1963	Democratic		
Cornelia A. Robinson	1959–1964	Democratic	Term ended by adoption of 1963 state constitution	
Frank Hartman	1961–1964	Democratic	Term ended by adoption of 1963 state constitution	
James F. O'Neil	1963–1964	Republican	Term ended by adoption of 1963 state constitution	
James F. O'Neil	1967–1974	Republican		
Leon Fill	1965–1966	Democratic		
Donald M. D. Thurber	1965–1966	Democratic		
Carmen L. DelliQuadri	1965–1968	Democratic		
Peter Oppewall	1965–1970	Democratic		
Charles E. Morton	1965–1972	Democratic		
Edwin L. Novak	1965–1972	Democratic		
Marilyn Jean Kelly	1965–1976	Democratic		
Thomas J. Brennan	1965–1972	Democratic	Resigned	
Leroy G. Augenstein	1967–1969	Republican	Died in office	
Gorton Riethmiller	1969–1976	William Milliken	Appointed to fill vacancy in 1969 and 1974	
Michael J. Deeb	1969–1974	Democratic	Resigned	
Annetta Miller	1971–1994	Democratic		
Barbara A. Dumouchelle	1973–1986	William Milliken	Initially appointed to fill vacancy, elected in 1978	
Barbara A. Dumouchelle	1973–1986	Republican	Resigned	
Barbara A. Dumouchelle	1989–1992	Republican	Resigned	
William A. Sederburg	1973–1975	Republican	Resigned	
Edmund F. Vandette	1973–1988	Republican		
Norman O. Stockmeyer Sr.	1975–1988	William Milliken	Initially appointed to fill vacancy, later elected	
Norman O. Stockmeyer Sr.	1975–1988	Republican		
Barbara Roberts Mason	1975–1998	Democratic		
Roger B. Tilles	1975	Democratic	Resigned	
Paul B. Henry	1975–1978	Republican	Appointed to fill vacancy; resigned	
Gumecindo Salas	1977–1984	Democratic		
Gumecindo Salas	1987–1994	Democratic		
John Watanen	1977–1984	Democratic		
Silverenia Q. Kanoyton	1978–1981	William Milliken	Appointed to fill vacancy; resigned	
David Laro	1981–1982	William Milliken	Appointed to fill vacancy	
Carroll M. Hutton	1983–1988	Democratic	Resigned	
Dorothy Beardmore	1985–2000	Republican		
Cherry Jacobus	1985–1992	Republican		
Rollie Hopgood	1988–1990	James J. Blanchard	Appointed to fill vacancy	
Marilyn Fisher Lundy	1989–1996	Republican		
Dick DeVos	1991–1993	Republican	Resigned	
Katherine J. DeGrow	1992–1995	John Engler	Appointed to fill vacancy; resigned	
Kathleen N. Straus	1993–2016	Democratic		
Gary Wolfram	1993–1998	John Engler	Appointed to fill vacancy	
Clark Durant	1995–1999	Republican	Resigned	
Sharon Wise	1995–2002	Republican		
Ruth A. Braun	1995–1996	John Engler	Appointed to fill vacancy; resigned	
Louis Legg III	1996	John Engler	Appointed to fill vacancy	
Herbert S. Moyer	1997–2004	Democratic		
Marianne Yared McGuire	1997–2012	Democratic		
Sharon L. Gire	1999–2003	Democratic	Resigned	
Eileen L. Weiser	1999–2006	Republican		
Eileen L. Weiser	2011–2018	Republican		
Michael D. Warren Jr.	1999–2002	John Engler	Appointed to fill vacancy	
John C. Austin	2001–2016	Democratic		
Elizabeth W. Bauer	2003–2010	Democratic		
Carolyn L. Curtin	2003–2010	Republican		
Reginald M. Turner	2003–2010	Jennifer Granholm	Initially appointed to fill vacancy, later elected	
Reginald M. Turner	2003–2010	Democratic	Resigned	
Nancy Danhof	2005–2012	Republican		
Cassandra E. Ulbrich	2007–2022	Democratic		
Daniel Varner	2010–2014	Jennifer Granholm	Appointed to fill vacancy	
Richard Zeile	2011–2018	Republican		
Michelle Fecteau	2013–2020	Democratic		
Lupe Ramos-Montigny	2013–2020	Democratic		
Pamela Pugh	2015–pres.	Democratic		
Tom McMillin	2017–pres.	Republican		
Nikki Snyder	2017–pres.	Republican		
Judith Pritchett	2019–pres.	Democratic		
Tiffany Tilley	2019–pres.	Democratic		
Ellen Lipton	2021–pres.	Democratic		
Jason Strayhorn	2021–2022	Democratic	Resigned	
Mitchell Robinson	2023–pres.	Democratic		
Marshall Bullock	2023–pres.	Gretchen Whitmer	Appointed to fill vacancy	
