= Michael P. Flanagan (educator) =

State Superintendent in Michigan

Michael P. Flanagan served as State Superintendent in Michigan from 2005 to July 2015. Flanagan chairs the State Board of Education and is the chief executive officer of the Michigan Department of Education. His role is to advise the State Board of Education, the governor, and the state Legislature regarding public education in Michigan.

== Portfolio ==
Flanagan also serves on several national and state boards of directors, including:

- Council of Chief State School Officers (CCSSO) executive board member
- Education Commission of the States (ECS) steering committee member
- Michigan Virtual University executive board member
- Library of Michigan executive board member
- MI Governor's Talent investment board member
- The Michigan Public School Employees’ Retirement System board member
- Michigan's superintendent of public instruction.

== Personal ==
Flanagan has degrees from the University of Notre Dame and Eastern Michigan University. He is married to Anna and has three married children: Mike, Brian, and Christa, with grandchildren: Alysha, Ella, Avery, Will, Landen, Joey, and Brooklyn.

== Awards ==
Flanagan is the first state superintendent of the United States to have been awarded with the "Distinguished Service Award" from the National Association of State Boards of Education. The award ceremony took place in July, 2013 in Arlington, Va. Nominated for the award by the Michigan State Board of Education, the annual award is given to a member of the organization to honor his work in the field of public education. "The Michigan State Board nominated Flanagan for this contributions towards public education" said NASBE Executive Director Kristen Amundson.
