= Pamela Pugh =

American politician (born 1970)

President of the Michigan State Board of Education
- Incumbent
- Assumed office January 10, 2023
- Preceded by: Casandra Ulbrich

Personal details
- Born: Pamela Louise Pugh; December 20, 1970 (age 55) Newton, Mississippi, U.S.
- Party: Democratic
- Education: Florida A&M University (BS); University of Michigan (MS, DPH)

Pamela Louise Pugh (born December 20, 1970) is an American public health scientist, politician, and the current president of the Michigan State Board of Education. She first won election to the board in 2014 and was reelected in 2022. She was a Democratic candidate for Michigan's 8th congressional district in the U.S. House of Representatives in 2024.

== Biography ==
Pamela Pugh was born on December 20, 1970, in Newton, Mississippi. Her father, John Pugh, is a civil rights activist, professor, and administrator at Delta College and her mother was a paraprofessional. She attended Florida A&M earning a Bachelor of Science and the University of Michigan graduating with a Master of Science and Doctorate of Public Health. Pugh serves on multiple boards including the Healthy Schools Network Board of Directors and the National Association of State Boards of Education Board of Directors. She also served as the Chief Public Health Advisor to the city of Flint during its water crisis.

Pugh is the first Black woman to serve as the President of the Michigan State Board of Education. She was voted president in a 6–0 vote with two Republican members voting present.

=== 2024 elections ===
On May 23, 2023, Pugh announced her candidacy as a Democrat for the U.S. Senate in 2024. Pugh withdrew from the race on November 27 to instead run for the 8th district in the U.S. House of Representatives, 11 days after incumbent Dan Kildee announced that he was not seeking re-election.

== Electoral history ==
2014 Michigan State Board of Education Election
Party	Candidate	Votes	%	±%
Democratic	Pamela Pugh Smith	1,368,790	24.5%	
Democratic	Casandra E. Ulbrich (incumbent)	1,309,760	23.4%	
Republican	Maria Carl	1,279,122	22.9%	
Republican	Jonathan Tade Williams	1,206,419	21.6%	
Libertarian	Kimberly Moore	114,666	2.1%	
Constitution	John Adams	82,511	1.5%	
Libertarian	Gregory Scott Stempfle	75,702	1.4%	
Constitution	Karen Adams	65,828	1.2%	
Green	Sherry A. Wells	60,516	1.1%	
Natural Law	Nikki Mattson	30,099	0.5%	
Turnout		5,593,413	36.5%	
Democratic hold				

2022 Michigan State Board of Education Election
Party	Candidate	Votes	%	±%
Democratic	Pamela Pugh (incumbent)	2,068,706	25.2%	+0.7%
Democratic	Mitchell Robinson	1,989,022	24.2%	
Republican	Tami Carlone	1,914,330	23.3%	
Republican	Linda Lee Tarver	1,873,715	22.8%	
Working Class	Mary Anne Hering	135,789	1.7%	
Libertarian	Donna Gundle-Krieg	87,353	1.1%	
Libertarian	Bill Hall	87,316	1.1%	
Constitution	Ethan Hobson	48,248	0.6%	
Turnout		8,204,479	51.7%	
Democratic hold				
