= 2024 United States House of Representatives elections in Michigan =

- November 5, 2024

All 13 Michigan seats to the United States House of Representatives
	Majority party	Minority party
Party	Republican	Democratic
Seats before	6	7
Seats won	7	6
Seat change	▲1	▼1
Popular vote	2,676,970	2,634,228
Percentage	48.75%	47.97%
Swing	▲1.16%	▼1.86%

Republican hold Republican gain
Democratic hold
Republican
40–50%
50–60%
60–70%
70–80%
Democratic
40–50%
50–60%
60–70%
70–80%

The 2024 United States House of Representatives elections in Michigan were held on November 5, 2024 to elect 13 U.S. representatives from the state of Michigan, one from each of the state's congressional districts. The elections coincided with the U.S. presidential election, other elections to the House of Representatives, elections to the United States Senate, and various state and local elections. The primary elections took place on August 6, 2024.

== Overview ==
=== Statewide ===
Party	Candi- dates	Votes		Seats	
Party	Candi- dates	No.	%	No.	+/–
Republican Party	13	2,676,970	48.75%	7	▲1
Democratic Party	13	2,634,228	47.97%	6	▼1
Working Class Party	7	68,634	1.25%	0	Steady
Libertarian Party	9	58,729	1.07%	0	Steady
Green Party	5	33,911	0.62%	0	Steady
U.S. Taxpayers' Party	4	18,715	0.34%	0	Steady
Write-ins	2	26	0.00%	0	Steady
Total	53	5,491,213	100.00%	13	Steady

Popular vote
Republican	48.75%
Democratic	47.97%
Other	3.28%

House seats
Republican	53.85%
Democratic	46.15%

=== District ===
Results of the 2024 United States House of Representatives elections in Michigan by district:

District	Republican		Democratic		Others		Total		Result
District	Votes	%	Votes	%	Votes	%	Votes	%	Result
District 1	256,581	61.65%	180,937	37.92%	13,983	2.93%	477,184	100.00%	Republican hold
District 2	279,167	65.14%	135,824	31.69%	13,559	3.16%	428,550	100.00%	Republican hold
District 3	183,952	43.77%	225,510	53.66%	10,827	2.58%	420,289	100.00%	Democratic hold
District 4	234,489	55.07%	184,641	43.36%	6,687	1.57%	425,817	100.00%	Republican hold
District 5	269,215	65.68%	134,282	32.76%	6,379	1.56%	409,876	100.00%	Republican hold
District 6	158,658	35.00%	281,162	62.02%	13,486	2.98%	453,306	100.00%	Democratic hold
District 7	226,722	50.28%	209,959	46.56%	14,231	3.16%	450,912	100.00%	Republican gain
District 8	189,317	44.61%	217,490	51.25%	17,543	4.13%	424,350	100.00%	Democratic hold
District 9	312,593	66.76%	138,138	29.50%	17,507	3.74%	468,238	100.00%	Republican hold
District 10	217,437	51.13%	191,363	44.99%	16,501	3.88%	425,301	100.00%	Republican hold
District 11	177,432	39.61%	260,780	58.22%	9,713	2.17%	447,925	100.00%	Democratic hold
District 12	92,490	25.44%	253,354	69.70%	17,655	4.86%	363,499	100.00%	Democratic hold
District 13	78,917	24.54%	220,788	68.64%	21,944	6.82%	321,649	100.00%	Democratic hold
Total	2,676,970	48.75%	2,634,228	47.97%	180,015	3.28%	5,491,213	100.00%	

== District 1 ==
2024 Michigan's 1st congressional district election
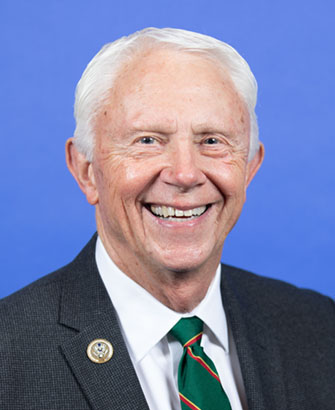

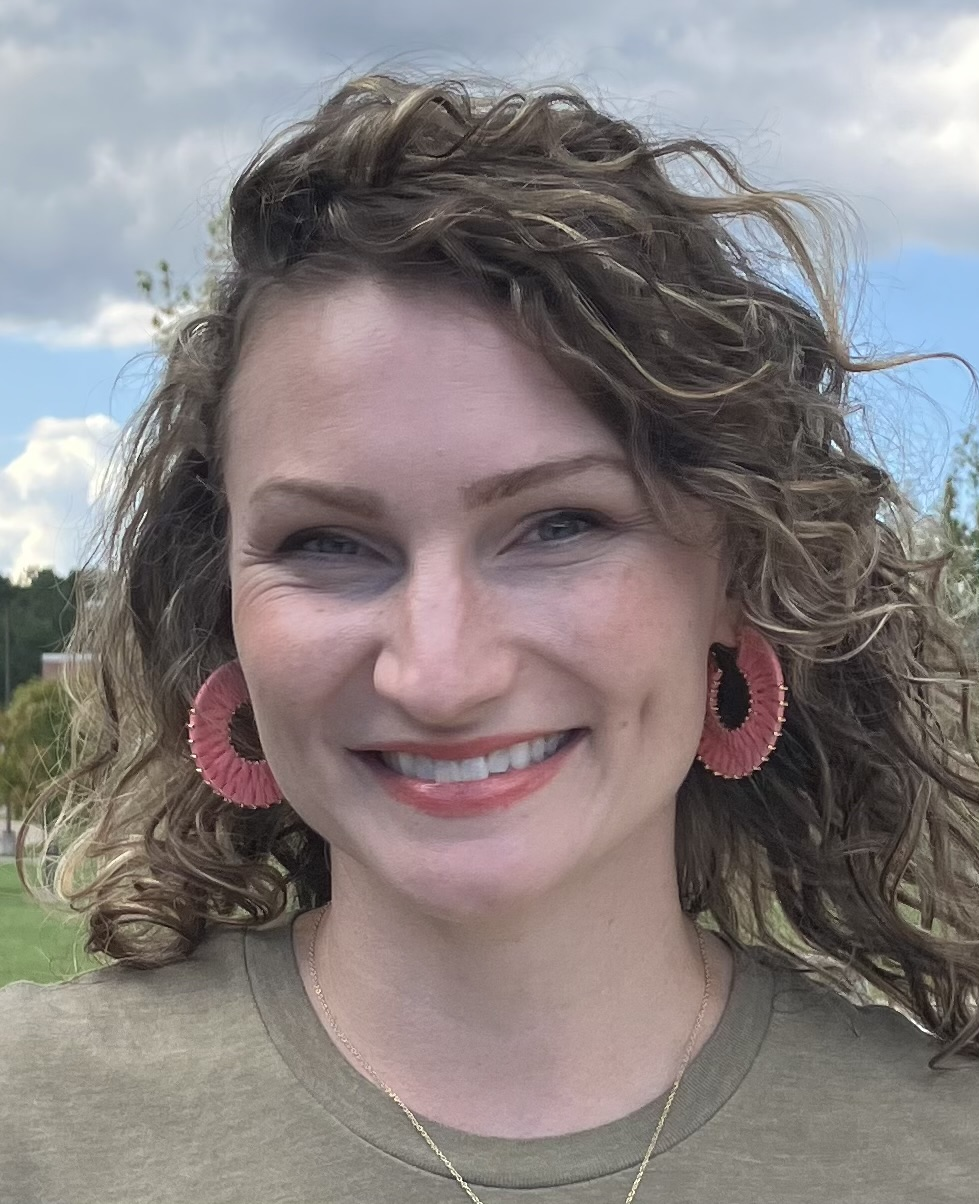
Nominee	Jack Bergman	Callie Barr
Party	Republican	Democratic
Popular vote	282,264	180,937
Percentage	59.1%	37.9%
- County results Bergman: 50–60% 60–70% 70–80% Barr: 50–60%
U.S. Representative before election
Jack Bergman
Republican
Elected U.S. Representative
Jack Bergman
Republican

The 1st district covers the Upper Peninsula and the northern part of the Lower Peninsula, including Alpena and Traverse City. The incumbent was Republican Jack Bergman, who was re-elected with 59.1% of the vote in 2024.

=== Republican primary ===
==== Nominee ====
- Jack Bergman, incumbent U.S. representative

==== Eliminated in primary ====
- Josh Saul, accountant

==== Disqualified ====
- J.D. Wilson, consulting firm owner

==== Endorsements ====
Jack Bergman

Organizations

- AIPAC

==== Fundraising ====
Campaign finance reports as of June 30, 2024
Candidate	Raised	Spent	Cash on hand
Jack Bergman (R)	$1,177,126	$607,374	$579,824
Joshua Saul (R)	$8,378	$4,573	$3,805
Source: Federal Election Commission

==== Results ====
Republican primary results
Party	Candidate	Votes	%
Republican	Jack Bergman (incumbent)	92,498	79.3
Republican	Josh Saul	24,155	20.7
Total votes		116,653	100.0

=== Democratic primary ===
==== Nominee ====
- Callie Barr, lawyer

==== Eliminated in primary ====
- Bob Lorinser, Marquette County medical director and nominee for this district in 2022

==== Withdrew ====
- Josh Saul, accountant (ran as a Republican)

==== Endorsements ====
Callie Barr

Statewide officials

- Gretchen Whitmer, governor of Michigan (2019–present) (post-primary)

Organizations

- National Women's Political Caucus
- Vote Mama
Bob Lorinser

Organizations

- Vote Common Good

==== Fundraising ====
Campaign finance reports as of March 31, 2024
Candidate	Raised	Spent	Cash on hand
Callie Barr (D)	$350,231	$222,262	$127,970
Bob Lorinser (D)	$257,333 (Note: $5,082 of this total was self-funded by Lorinser.)	$199,523	$68,853
Source: Federal Election Commission

==== Results ====
Results by county: Barr—70–80% Barr—60–70% Barr—50–60% Lorinser—50–60%

Barr performed well across the district, securing 33 out of the 35 counties. She performed especially well in Mackinac and Cheboygan counties, as well as the portion of Wexford County in the district. Lorinser secured two counties in the Lower Peninsula: Alpena and Alcona. However, Barr still performed slightly better there, with 59.72% as compared to 56.48% in the Upper Peninsula.

Democratic primary results
Party	Candidate	Votes	%
Democratic	Callie Barr	40,787	58.5
Democratic	Bob Lorinser	28,936	41.5
Total votes		69,723	100.0

=== General election ===
==== Predictions ====
Source	Ranking	As of
The Cook Political Report	Solid R	November 16, 2023
Inside Elections	Solid R	November 16, 2023
Sabato's Crystal Ball	Safe R	November 16, 2023
Elections Daily	Safe R	February 5, 2024
CNalysis	Solid R	November 16, 2023

==== Results ====
2024 Michigan's 1st congressional district election
Party	Candidate	Votes	%
Republican	Jack Bergman (incumbent)	282,264	59.1
Democratic	Callie Barr	180,937	37.9
Working Class	Liz Hakola	8,497	1.8
Libertarian	Andrew Gale	5,486	1.2
Total votes		477,184	100.0
Republican hold			

== District 2 ==
2024 Michigan's 2nd congressional district election
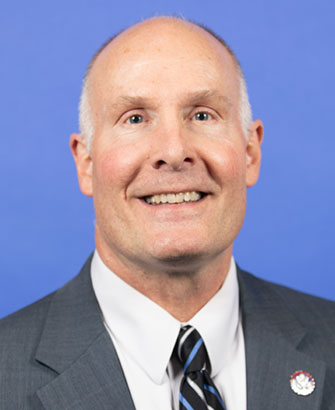

Nominee	John Moolenaar	Michael Lynch
Party	Republican	Democratic
Popular vote	279,167	135,824
Percentage	65.1%	31.7%
- County results Moolenaar: 50–60% 60–70% 70–80%
U.S. Representative before election
John Moolenaar
Republican
Elected U.S. Representative
John Moolenaar
Republican

The 2nd district covers most of central Michigan including some of the outer Grand Rapids metropolitan area. The incumbent was Republican John Moolenaar, who was re-elected with 65.1% of the vote in 2024.

=== Republican primary ===
==== Nominee ====
- John Moolenaar, incumbent U.S. representative

==== Endorsements ====
John Moolenaar

Organizations

- AIPAC

==== Fundraising ====
Campaign finance reports as of March 31, 2024
Candidate	Raised	Spent	Cash on hand
John Moolenaar (R)	$1,327,593	$686,198	$1,147,566
Source: Federal Election Commission

==== Results ====
Republican primary results
Party	Candidate	Votes	%
Republican	John Moolenaar (incumbent)	94,937	100.0
Total votes		94,937	100.0

=== Democratic primary ===
==== Nominee ====
- Michael Lynch, marketing director and educator

==== Results ====
Democratic primary results
Party	Candidate	Votes	%
Democratic	Michael Lynch	39,503	100.0
Total votes		39,503	100.0

=== General election ===
==== Predictions ====
Source	Ranking	As of
The Cook Political Report	Safe R	November 16, 2023
Inside Elections	Safe R	November 16, 2023
Sabato's Crystal Ball	Safe R	November 16, 2023
Elections Daily	Safe R	February 5, 2024
CNalysis	Solid R	November 16, 2023

==== Results ====
2024 Michigan's 2nd congressional district election
Party	Candidate	Votes	%
Republican	John Moolenaar (incumbent)	279,167	65.1
Democratic	Michael Lynch	135,824	31.7
Libertarian	Ben DeJong	7,037	1.6
U.S. Taxpayers'	Scott Adams	6,522	1.5
Total votes		428,550	100.0
Republican hold			

== District 3 ==
2024 Michigan's 3rd congressional district election
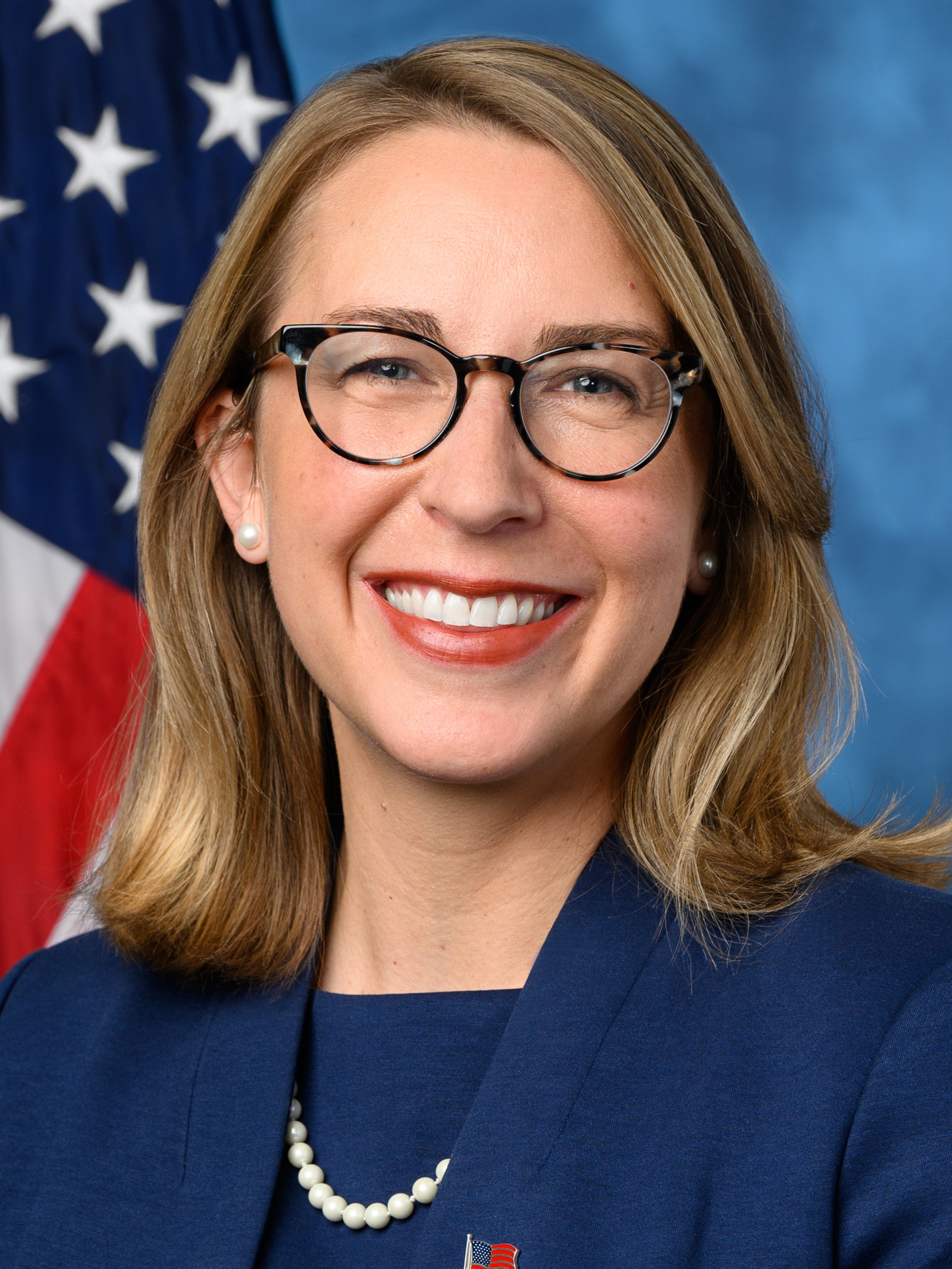

Nominee	Hillary Scholten	Paul Hudson
Party	Democratic	Republican
Popular vote	225,510	183,952
Percentage	53.7%	43.8%
- Scholten: 40–50% 50–60% 60–70% 70–80% 80–90% >90% Hudson: 40–50% 50–60% 60–70% 70–80%
U.S. Representative before election
Hillary Scholten
Democratic
Elected U.S. Representative
Hillary Scholten
Democratic

The 3rd district is based in western Michigan, and includes Grand Rapids, Muskegon, and parts of Ottawa County. The incumbent was Democrat Hillary Scholten, who flipped the district and was elected with 54.9% of the vote in 2022. She won with 53.7% of the vote in 2024.

=== Democratic primary ===
==== Nominee ====
- Hillary Scholten, incumbent U.S. representative

==== Eliminated in primary ====
- Salim Al-Shatel, real estate agent

==== Endorsements ====
Hillary Scholten

Governors

- Gretchen Whitmer, governor of Michigan (2019-present)

U.S representatives

- Seth Moulton, U.S. representative from Massachusetts's 6th congressional district (2015–present)

Organizations

- AIPAC
- Brady PAC
- Democratic Majority for Israel
- EMILY's List
- Everytown for Gun Safety Action Fund
- Giffords
- Humane Society Legislative Fund
- J Street PAC
- Jewish Democratic Council of America
- Joint Action Committee for Political Affairs
- League of Conservation Voters
- NARAL Pro-Choice America
- NextGen America PAC
- Planned Parenthood Action Fund
- Population Connection Action Fund
- Sierra Club
- Vote Mama

Labor unions

- Michigan AFL-CIO
- Michigan Education Association
- National Education Association

==== Fundraising ====
Campaign finance reports as of June 30, 2024
Candidate	Raised	Spent	Cash on hand
Hillary Scholten (D)	$2,466,882	$678,989	$1,798,238
Salim Mohammed Al-Shatel (D)	$3,047	$3,047	$0
Source: Federal Election Commission

==== Results ====
Democratic primary results
Party	Candidate	Votes	%
Democratic	Hillary Scholten (incumbent)	64,546	90.6
Democratic	Salim Al-Shatel	6,665	9.4
Total votes		71,211	100.0

=== Republican primary ===
==== Nominee ====
- Paul Hudson, attorney and nominee for Supreme Court justice in 2022

==== Eliminated in primary ====
- Michael Markey, financial advisor and candidate for governor in 2022

==== Endorsements ====
Michael Markey

State legislators

- Jay DeBoyer, state representative
- Neil Friske, state representative
- Mike Harris, state representative
- Gina Johnsen, state representative
- Tom Leonard, former speaker of the Michigan House of Representatives
- Gregory Markkanen, state representative
- Angela Rigas, state representative

Organizations

- Ottawa County Republican Party

==== Fundraising ====
Campaign finance reports as of March 31, 2024
Candidate	Raised	Spent	Cash on hand
Paul Hudson (R)	$625,642 (Note: $250,098 of this total was self-funded by Hudson.)	$281,923	$343,718
Jason Ickes (R)	$40,093 (Note: $13,400 of this total was self-funded by Ickes.)	$39,960	$132
Michael Markey (R)	$769,321 (Note: $430,022 of this total was self-funded by Markey.)	$626,127	$143,193
Source: Federal Election Commission

==== Results ====
Republican primary results
Party	Candidate	Votes	%
Republican	Paul Hudson	39,410	54.7
Republican	Michael Markey	32,678	45.3
Total votes		72,088	100.0

=== General election ===
==== Predictions ====
Source	Ranking	As of
The Cook Political Report	Likely D	May 24, 2024
Inside Elections	Likely D	May 9, 2024
Sabato's Crystal Ball	Likely D	November 16, 2023
Elections Daily	Safe D	February 5, 2024
CNalysis	Solid D	June 15, 2024
FiveThirtyEight	Likely D	October 28, 2024

==== Results ====
2024 Michigan's 3rd congressional district election
Party	Candidate	Votes	%
Democratic	Hillary Scholten (incumbent)	225,510	53.7
Republican	Paul Hudson	183,952	43.8
Working Class	Louis Palus	5,546	1.3
Libertarian	Alex Avery	5,281	1.2
Total votes		420,289	100.0
Democratic hold			

== District 4 ==
2024 Michigan's 4th congressional district election
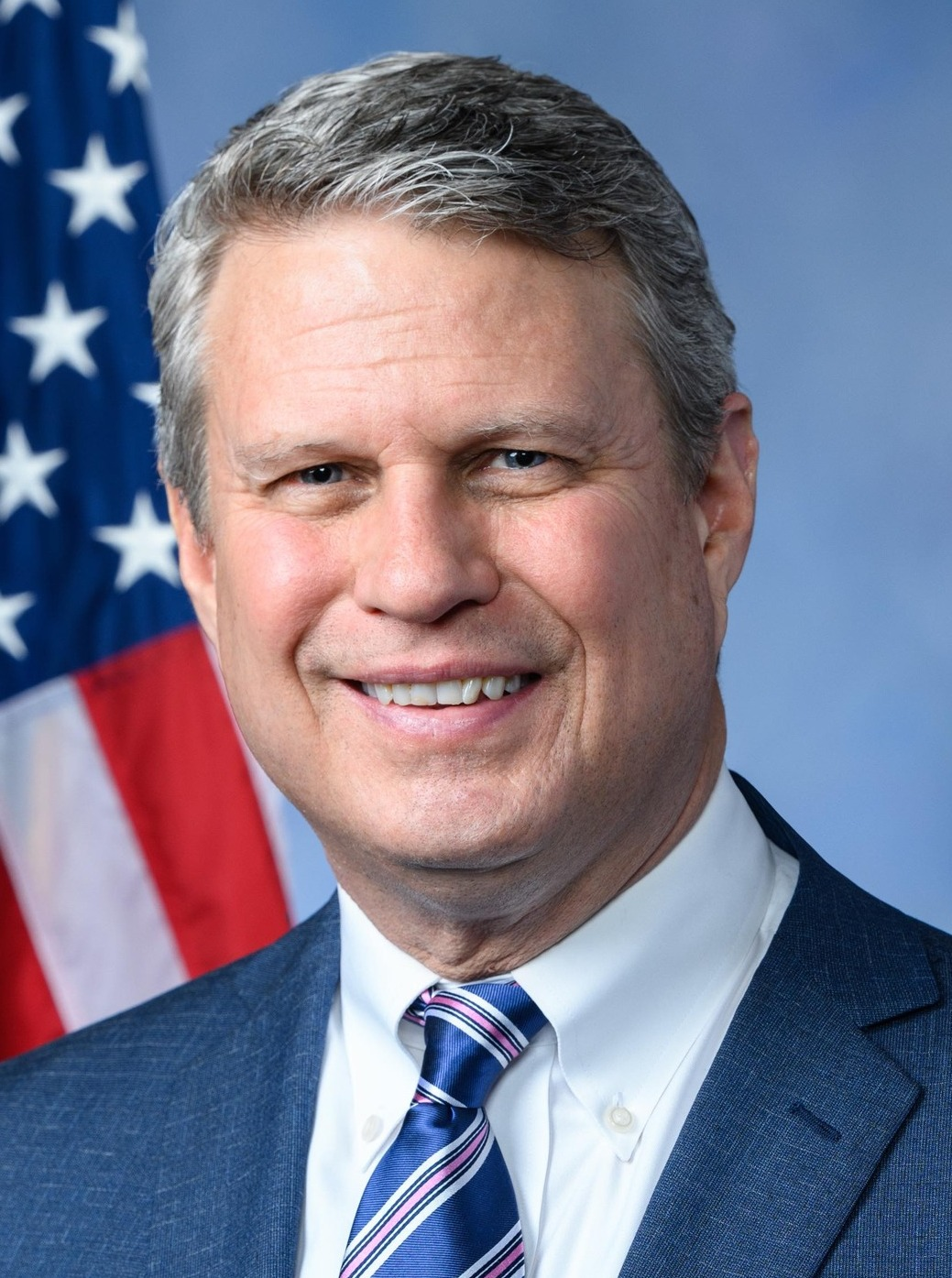

Nominee	Bill Huizenga	Jessica Swartz
Party	Republican	Democratic
Popular vote	234,489	184,641
Percentage	55.1%	43.4%
- Huizenga: 40–50% 50–60% 60–70% 70–80% 80–90% Swartz: 40–50% 50–60% 60–70% 70–80% 80–90% >90% Tie: 40–50% No votes
U.S. Representative before election
Bill Huizenga
Republican
Elected U.S. Representative
Bill Huizenga
Republican

The 4th district is based in southwestern Michigan, and includes the cities of Kalamazoo and Holland. The incumbent, Republican Bill Huizenga, was re-elected with 54.4% of the vote in 2022.

=== Republican primary ===
==== Nominee ====
- Bill Huizenga, incumbent U.S. representative

==== Eliminated in primary ====
- Brendan Muir, chair of the Ottawa County Republican Party

==== Endorsements ====
Bill Huizenga

Organizations

- AIPAC
Brendan Muir

Party chapters

- Ottawa County Republican Party

==== Fundraising ====
Campaign finance reports as of March 31, 2024
Candidate	Raised	Spent	Cash on hand
Bill Huizenga (R)	$1,866,475	$788,498	$1,179,445
Source: Federal Election Commission

==== Results ====
Republican primary results
Party	Candidate	Votes	%
Republican	Bill Huizenga (incumbent)	67,749	73.4
Republican	Brendan Muir	24,580	26.6
Total votes		92,329	100.0

=== Democratic primary ===
==== Nominee ====
- Jessica Swartz, lawyer and former appellate attorney for the U.S. Department of Veterans Affairs

==== Withdrawn ====
- Joseph Alfonso, member of the Michigan State Plumbing Board and nominee for this district in 2022

==== Endorsements ====
Jessica Swartz

Statewide officials

- Gretchen Whitmer, governor of Michigan (2019–present) (post-primary)

Labor unions

- Communications Workers of America
- Michigan Education Association
- National Education Association
Joseph Alfonso (withdrawn)

Organizations

- Latino Victory Fund
- Vote Common Good

==== Fundraising ====
Campaign finance reports as of March 31, 2024
Candidate	Raised	Spent	Cash on hand
Joseph Alfonso (D)	$11,225	$6,195	$6,130
Jessica Swartz (D)	$376,075	$249,070	$127,005
Source: Federal Election Commission

==== Results ====
Democratic primary results
Party	Candidate	Votes	%
Democratic	Jessica Swartz	49,169	100.0
Total votes		49,169	100.0

=== General election ===
==== Predictions ====
Source	Ranking	As of
The Cook Political Report	Solid R	November 16, 2023
Inside Elections	Solid R	November 16, 2023
Sabato's Crystal Ball	Safe R	November 16, 2023
Elections Daily	Safe R	February 5, 2024
CNalysis	Very Likely R	November 16, 2023

==== Results ====
2024 Michigan's 4th congressional district election
Party	Candidate	Votes	%
Republican	Bill Huizenga (incumbent)	234,489	55.1
Democratic	Jessica Swartz	184,641	43.4
U.S. Taxpayers'	Curtis Clark	6,687	1.6
Total votes		425,817	100.0
Republican hold			

== District 5 ==
2024 Michigan's 5th congressional district election
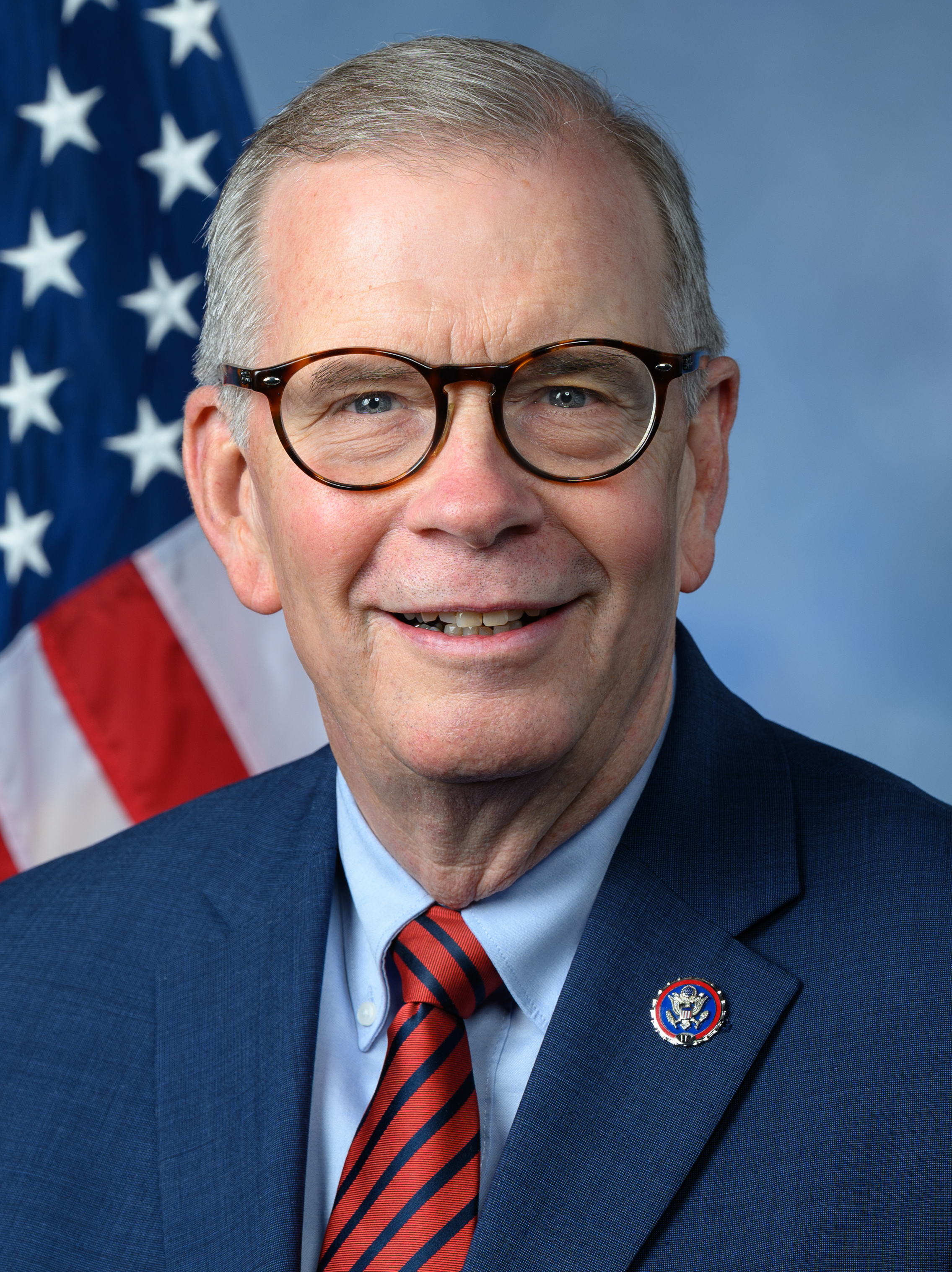

Nominee	Tim Walberg	Libbi Urban
Party	Republican	Democratic
Popular vote	269,215	134,282
Percentage	65.7%	32.8%
- County results Walberg: 60–70% 70–80%
U.S. Representative before election
Tim Walberg
Republican
Elected U.S. Representative
Tim Walberg
Republican

The 5th district is located in southern Michigan and covers the state's entire border with both Indiana and Ohio. The incumbent was Republican Tim Walberg, who was re-elected with 62.4% of the vote in 2022.

=== Republican primary ===
==== Nominee ====
- Tim Walberg, incumbent U.S. representative

==== Endorsements ====
Tim Walberg

Organizations

- AIPAC

==== Fundraising ====
Campaign finance reports as of March 31, 2024
Candidate	Raised	Spent	Cash on hand
Tim Walberg (R)	$842,346	$581,233	$1,324,569
Source: Federal Election Commission

==== Results ====
Republican primary results
Party	Candidate	Votes	%
Republican	Tim Walberg (incumbent)	81,651	100.0
Total votes		81,651	100.0

=== Democratic primary ===
==== Nominee ====
- Libbi Urban, retired electrician

==== Results ====
Democratic primary results
Party	Candidate	Votes	%
Democratic	Libbi Urban	36,087	100.0
Total votes		36,087	100.0

=== General election ===
==== Predictions ====
Source	Ranking	As of
The Cook Political Report	Solid R	November 16, 2023
Inside Elections	Solid R	November 16, 2023
Sabato's Crystal Ball	Safe R	November 16, 2023
Elections Daily	Safe R	February 5, 2024
CNalysis	Solid R	November 16, 2023

==== Results ====
2024 Michigan's 5th congressional district election
Party	Candidate	Votes	%
Republican	Tim Walberg (incumbent)	269,215	65.7
Democratic	Libbi Urban	134,282	32.8
Green	James Bronke	6,379	1.5
Total votes		409,876	100.0
Republican hold			

== District 6 ==
2024 Michigan's 6th congressional district election
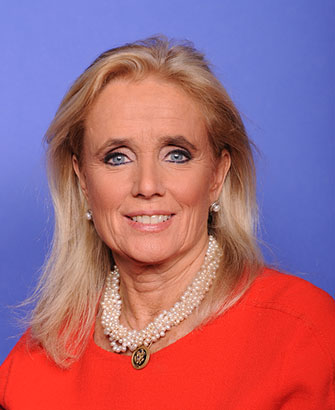

Nominee	Debbie Dingell	Heather Smiley
Party	Democratic	Republican
Popular vote	281,162	158,658
Percentage	62.0%	35.0%
- County results Dingell: 50–60% 70–80%
U.S. Representative before election
Debbie Dingell
Democratic
Elected U.S. Representative
Debbie Dingell
Democratic

The 6th district is centered around Ann Arbor and Washtenaw County, also including parts of western and southern Wayne County. The incumbent was Democrat Debbie Dingell, who was re-elected with 62% of the vote in 2024.

=== Democratic primary ===
==== Nominee ====
- Debbie Dingell, incumbent U.S. representative

==== Endorsements ====
Debbie Dingell

U.S. representatives

- Gabby Giffords, U.S. representative from Arizona's 8th congressional district (2007–2012)

Organizations

- Feminist Majority PAC
- Giffords
- Humane Society Legislative Fund
- J Street PAC
- Joint Action Committee for Political Affairs
- Natural Resources Defense Council
- Sierra Club

Labor unions

- Michigan AFL-CIO
- Michigan Education Association
- National Education Association

==== Fundraising ====
Campaign finance reports as of March 31, 2024
Candidate	Raised	Spent	Cash on hand
Debbie Dingell (D)	$860,335	$811,566	$446,574
Source: Federal Election Commission

==== Results ====
Democratic primary results
Party	Candidate	Votes	%
Democratic	Debbie Dingell (incumbent)	101,234	100.0
Total votes		101,234	100.0

=== Republican primary ===
==== Nominee ====
- Heather Smiley, office analyst

==== Results ====
Republican primary results
Party	Candidate	Votes	%
Republican	Heather Smiley	37,178	100.0
Total votes		37,178	100.0

=== General election ===
==== Predictions ====
Source	Ranking	As of
The Cook Political Report	Solid D	November 16, 2023
Inside Elections	Solid D	November 16, 2023
Sabato's Crystal Ball	Safe D	November 16, 2023
Elections Daily	Safe D	February 5, 2024
CNalysis	Solid D	November 16, 2023

==== Results ====
2024 Michigan's 6th congressional district election
Party	Candidate	Votes	%
Democratic	Debbie Dingell (incumbent)	281,162	62.0
Republican	Heather Smiley	158,658	35.0
Green	Clyde K. Shabazz	7,963	1.8
Libertarian	Bill Krebaum	5,523	1.2
Total votes		453,306	100.0
Democratic hold			

== District 7 ==
2024 Michigan's 7th congressional district election
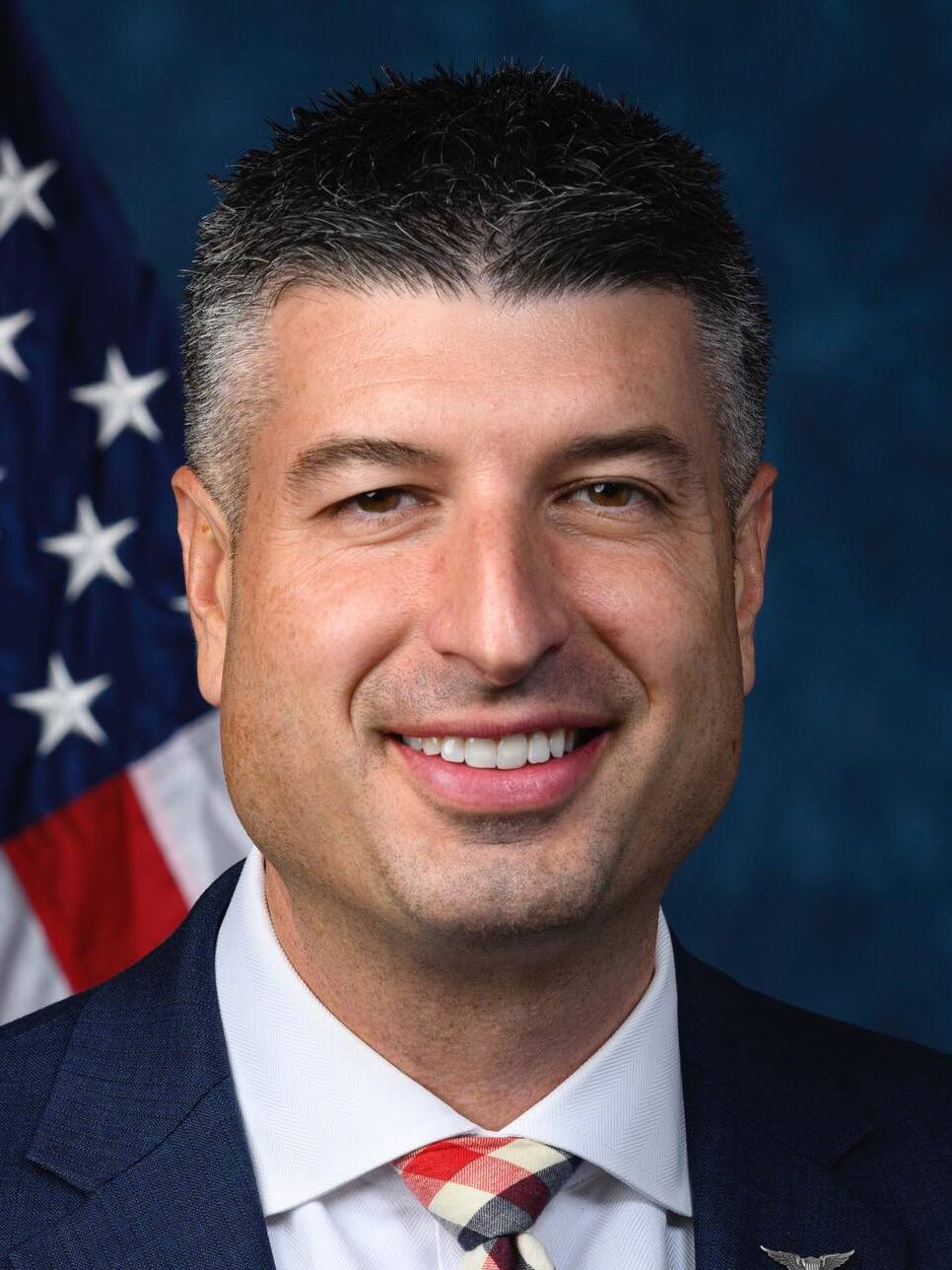

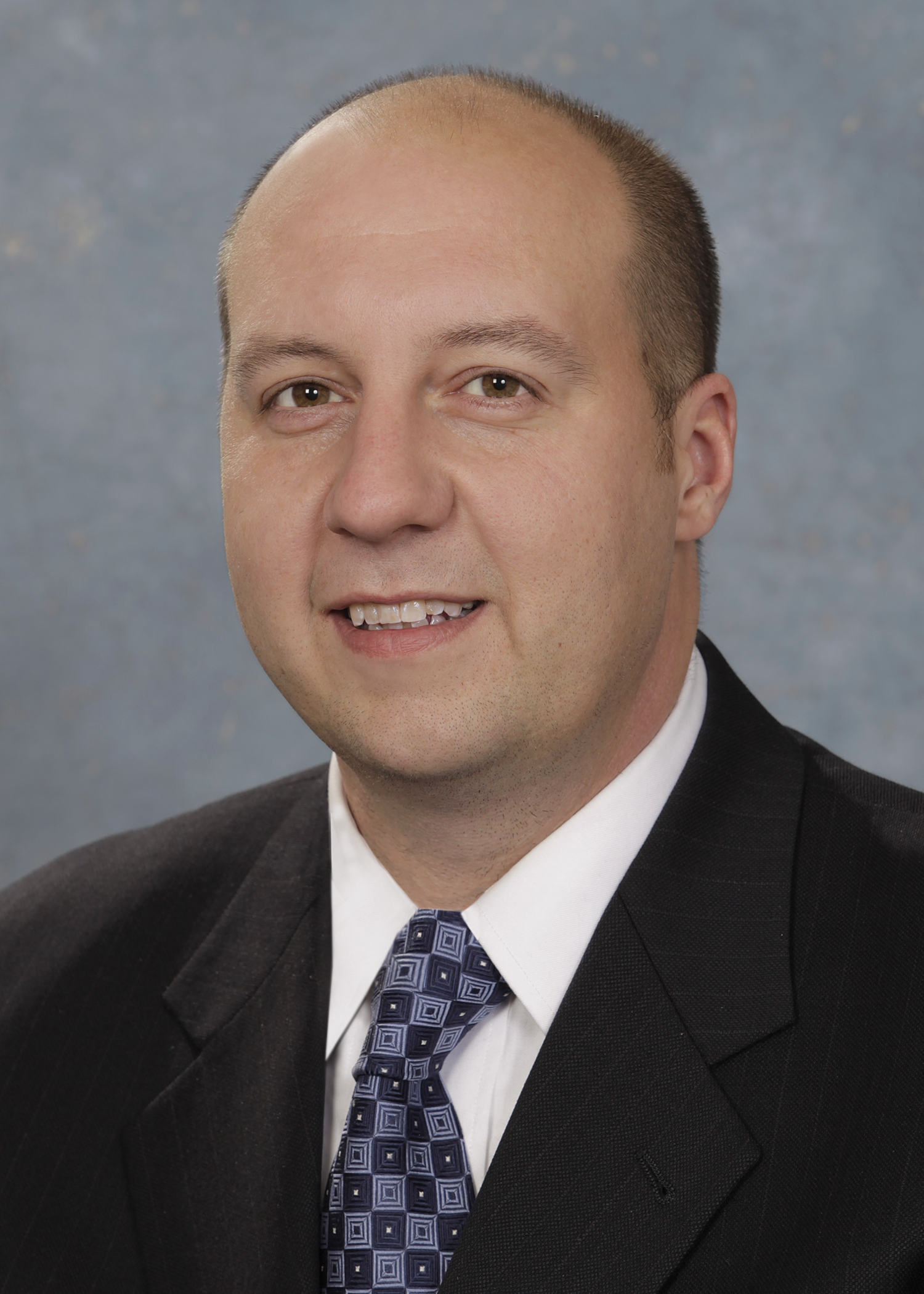
Nominee	Tom Barrett	Curtis Hertel Jr.
Party	Republican	Democratic
Popular vote	226,722	209,959
Percentage	50.3%	46.6%
- County results Barrett: 50–60% 60–70% Hertel: 60–70%
U.S. Representative before election
Elissa Slotkin
Democratic
Elected U.S. Representative
Tom Barrett
Republican

The 7th district is based around the Lansing–East Lansing metropolitan area, but also includes Livingston County and a small part of Oakland County. The incumbent was Democrat Elissa Slotkin, who was re-elected with 51.7% of the vote in 2022. She did not seek re-election, instead choosing to run for U.S. Senate to succeed Debbie Stabenow. Republican Tom Barrett won the open seat.

=== Democratic primary ===
==== Nominee ====
- Curtis Hertel Jr., former state senator and nephew of former U.S. Representative Dennis Hertel

==== Declined ====
- Sarah Anthony, state senator
- Barbara Byrum, Ingham County clerk and former state representative (ran for re-election, endorsed Hertel)
- Kara Hope, state representative (endorsed Hertel)
- Andy Schor, mayor of Lansing (endorsed Hertel)
- Sam Singh, state senator (endorsed Hertel)
- Elissa Slotkin, incumbent U.S. representative (ran for U.S. Senate, endorsed Hertel)
- Angela Witwer, state representative (endorsed Hertel)

==== Endorsements ====
Curtis Hertel Jr.

U.S. representatives

- Gabby Giffords, U.S. representative from Arizona's 8th congressional district (2007–2012)
- Elissa Slotkin, incumbent U.S. representative from this district

Governors

- Gretchen Whitmer, governor of Michigan (2019–present)

State legislators

- Kara Hope, state representative
- Sam Singh, state senator
- Angela Witwer, state representative

County officials

- Barbara Byrum, Ingham County clerk and former state representative

Local officials

- Andy Schor, mayor of Lansing

Organizations

- Council for a Livable World
- DCCC Red to Blue
- Democratic Majority for Israel
- End Citizens United
- Everytown for Gun Safety
- Giffords
- Jewish Democratic Council of America
- League of Conservation Voters
- NewDem Action Fund
- Planned Parenthood Action Fund
- Reproductive Freedom for All
- Swing Left

Labor unions

- Actors' Equity Association
- Michigan AFL-CIO
- Michigan Education Association
- National Education Association

==== Fundraising ====
Campaign finance reports as of March 31, 2024
Candidate	Raised	Spent	Cash on hand
Curtis Hertel Jr. (D)	$2,632,416	$484,416	$2,148,000
Source: Federal Election Commission

==== Results ====
Democratic primary results
Party	Candidate	Votes	%
Democratic	Curtis Hertel Jr.	72,083	100.0
Total votes		72,083	100.0

=== Republican primary ===
==== Nominee ====
- Tom Barrett, former state senator for the 24th district and nominee for this district in 2022

==== Declined ====
- Mike Bishop, former U.S. representative

==== Endorsements ====
Tom Barrett

U.S. representatives

- Mike Johnson, U.S. representative from Louisiana's 4th congressional district (2017–present) and speaker of the House (2023–present)
- Kevin McCarthy, U.S. representative from California's 20th congressional district (2007–2023) and former speaker of the House (2023)
- Elise Stefanik, U.S. representative from New York's 21st congressional district (2015-present) and chair of the House Republican Conference

Organizations

- Americans for Prosperity
- Congressional Leadership Fund
- GOPAC
- National Federation of Independent Business
- U.S. Chamber of Commerce (post-primary)
- With Honor Fund

==== Fundraising ====
Campaign finance reports as of March 31, 2024
Candidate	Raised	Spent	Cash on hand
Tom Barrett (R)	$1,564,354	$611,512	$958,131
Source: Federal Election Commission

==== Results ====
Republican primary results
Party	Candidate	Votes	%
Republican	Tom Barrett	63,399	100.0
Total votes		63,399	100.0

=== General election ===
==== Predictions ====
Source	Ranking	As of
The Cook Political Report	Lean R (flip)	November 1, 2024
Inside Elections	Tilt R (flip)	October 31, 2024
Sabato's Crystal Ball	Lean R (flip)	November 4, 2024
Elections Daily	Lean R (flip)	November 4, 2024
CNalysis	Tilt D	November 4, 2024

==== Polling ====
Poll source	Date(s) administered	Sample size (Note: Key: A – all adults RV – registered voters LV – likely voters V – unclear)	Margin of error	Curtis Hertel Jr. (D)	Tom Barrett (R)	Undecided
Emerson College (Note: Poll sponsored by Nexstar and The Hill)	October 24–26, 2024	535 (LV)	± 4.2%	45%	47%	8% (Note: Dailey (L) with 1%)
Cygnal (R) (Note: Poll commissioned by Barrett's campaign)	October 6–8, 2024	405 (LV)	± 4.85%	43%	47%	10% (Note: Dailey (L) with 3%)
Cygnal (R) (Note: Poll commissioned by Barrett's campaign and the National Republican Congressional Committee)	August 27–29, 2024	420 (LV)	± 4.8%	43%	48%	9%
Noble Predictive Insights (Note: Poll sponsored by Inside Elections)	July 8–11, 2024	532 (LV)	± 4.4%	41%	48%	11%
Cygnal (R)	February 20–21, 2024	415 (LV)	± 4.8%	37%	44%	19%

==== Results ====
2024 Michigan's 7th congressional district election
Party	Candidate	Votes	%
Republican	Tom Barrett	226,722	50.3
Democratic	Curtis Hertel Jr.	209,959	46.6
Libertarian	L. Rachel Dailey	14,231	3.1
Total votes		450,912	100.0
Republican gain from Democratic			

== District 8 ==
2024 Michigan's 8th congressional district election
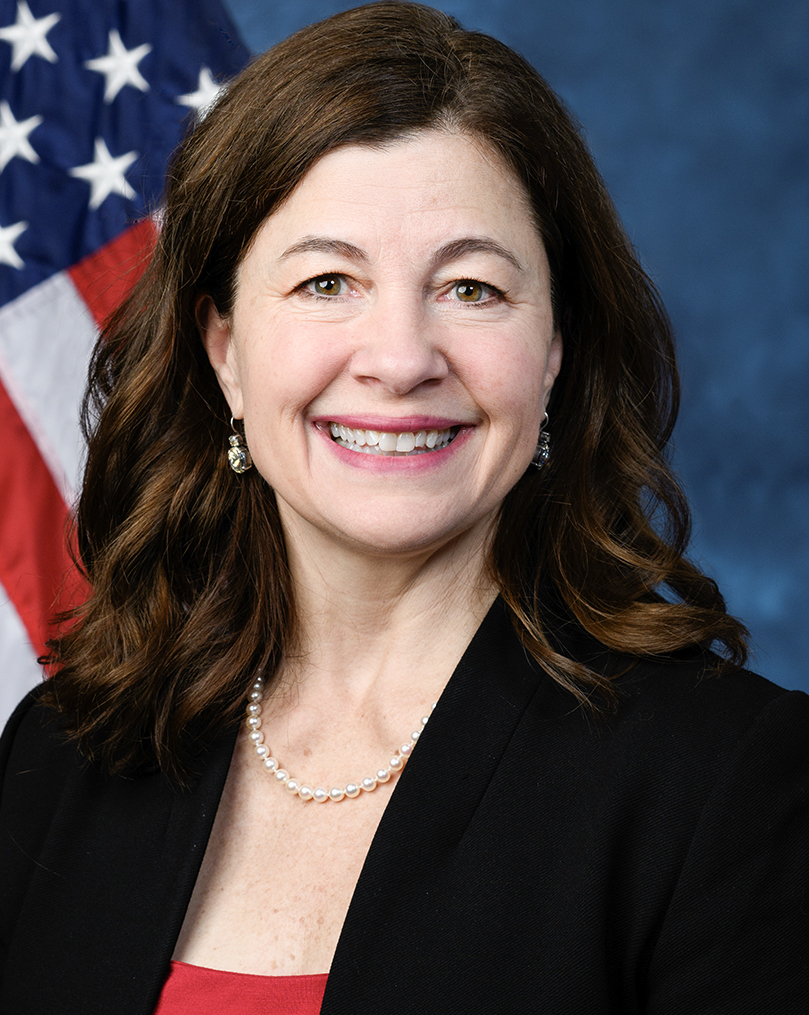

Nominee	Kristen McDonald Rivet	Paul Junge
Party	Democratic	Republican
Popular vote	217,490	189,317
Percentage	51.3%	44.6%
- McDonald Rivet: 40–50% 50–60% 60–70% 70–80% 80–90% >90% Junge: 40–50% 50–60% 60–70% 70–80% Tie: 50%
U.S. Representative before election
Dan Kildee
Democratic
Elected U.S. Representative
Kristen McDonald Rivet
Democratic

The 8th district centers around the Saginaw Bay and includes the cities of Flint, Saginaw, Bay City, and Midland. The incumbent was Democrat Dan Kildee, who was re-elected with 53.1% of the vote in 2022. On November 16, 2023, Kildee announced that he would retire and not seek re-election in 2024. State Senator Kristen McDonald Rivet was elected to succeed him.

=== Democratic primary ===
==== Nominee ====
- Kristen McDonald Rivet, state senator for the 35th district

==== Eliminated in primary ====
- Matthew Collier, former mayor of Flint
- Pamela Pugh, president of the Michigan State Board of Education (previously ran for U.S. Senate)

==== Withdrawn ====
- Dan Moilanen, former chair of the Genesee County Democratic Party
- Sheldon Neeley, mayor of Flint and former state representative

==== Declined ====
- Jim Ananich, former minority leader of the Michigan Senate
- John Daniel Cherry, state senator for the 27th district
- Domonique Clemons, Genesee County clerk
- Vanessa Guerra, Saginaw County clerk and former state representative for the 95th district (endorsed Pugh)
- Dan Kildee, incumbent U.S. representative (endorsed McDonald Rivet)
- Bobby Mukkamala, member of the American Medical Association Board of Trustees
- Mitchell Rivard, chief of staff to incumbent Dan Kildee
- Chris Swanson, Genesee County sheriff
- Karen Weaver, former mayor of Flint

==== Endorsements ====
Matthew Collier

Organizations

- VoteVets.org
Pamela Pugh

County officials

- Abdul El-Sayed, director of the Wayne County Department of Health, Human and Veterans Services
- Warren Evans, Wayne County executive (2015–present)
- Vanessa Guerra, Saginaw County clerk (2021–present) and former state representative from the 95th district (2015–2021)

Individuals

- Nasser Beydoun, businessman
- John Drew Sheard Sr., presiding bishop of the Church of God in Christ (2021–present)

Organizations

- Church of God in Christ Michigan/Canadian Council of Bishops PAC
- Vote Common Good
Kristen McDonald Rivet

U.S. representatives

- Lois Frankel, U.S. representative from Florida (2013–present)
- Dan Kildee, incumbent U.S. representative from this district

Statewide officials

- John D. Cherry Jr., former lieutenant governor of Michigan

State legislators

- Darrin Camilleri, state senator
- Stephanie Chang, state senator
- John Daniel Cherry, state senator
- Alabas Farhat, state representative
- Pam Faris, state representative
- Kevin Hertel, state senator
- Veronica Klinefelt, state senator
- Jasper Martus, state representative

County officials

- James Barcia, Bay County executive and former state senator

Organizations

- EMILY's List
- End Citizens United
- NewDem Action Fund
- Vote Mama

Labor unions

- Actors' Equity Association
- International Brotherhood of Electrical Workers Michigan
- Michigan AFL-CIO
- National Education Association and Michigan Education Association
- United Association Locals 85 and 370
- United Auto Workers

Newspapers

- Detroit Free Press

==== Polling ====
Poll source	Date(s) administered	Sample size	Margin of error	Matthew Collier	Kristen McDonald Rivet	Pamela Pugh	Undecided
Public Policy Polling (D) (Note: Poll sponsored by the Principled Veterans Fund, which is supporting Collier)	July 12–13, 2024	522 (LV)	–	22%	37%	9%	32%
Public Policy Polling (D)	June 26–27, 2024	455 (LV)	–	19%	32%	8%	42%
Public Policy Polling (D)	June 4–5, 2024	462 (LV)	–	10%	23%	10%	56%
Global Strategy Group (Note: Poll sponsored by McDonald Rivet's campaign)	April 30 – May 5, 2024	424 (LV)	± 4.7%	14%	34%	12%	40%

==== Fundraising ====
Campaign finance reports as of March 31, 2024
Candidate	Raised	Spent	Cash on hand
Matthew Collier (D)	$303,608 (Note: $16,600 of this total was self-funded by Collier.)	$13,608	$290,000
Kristen McDonald Rivet (D)	$826,016 (Note: $7,657 of this total was self-funded by McDonald Rivet.)	$155,341	$670,675
Pamela Pugh (D)	$231,389	$176,768	$54,621
Dan Moilanen (D) (Note: Withdrawn candidate)	$21,213	$19,540	$1,673
Sheldon Neeley (D)	$24,135	$67	$24,068
Source: Federal Election Commission

==== Results ====
Democratic primary results
Party	Candidate	Votes	%
Democratic	Kristen McDonald Rivet	43,393	53.3
Democratic	Matthew Collier	21,482	26.4
Democratic	Pamela Pugh	16,525	20.3
Total votes		81,400	100.0

=== Republican primary ===
==== Nominee ====
- Paul Junge, former FOX 47 news anchor, former external affairs director at U.S. Immigration and Customs Enforcement, and nominee for this district in 2020 and 2022

==== Eliminated in primary ====
- Mary Draves, former Dow Chemical Company executive
- Anthony Hudson, truck driver

==== Disqualified ====
- Nikki Snyder, member of the Michigan State Board of Education (2017–present) (previously ran for U.S. Senate)

==== Withdrawn ====
- Martin Blank, trauma surgeon

==== Declined ====
- Kenneth Horn, former state senator for the 32nd district
- David Martin, state representative for the 48th district
- Bill G. Schuette, state representative for the 95th district and son of former Michigan Attorney General Bill Schuette (ran for re-election)

==== Endorsements ====
Paul Junge

Executive branch officials

- Donald Trump, former president of the United States

Newspapers

- Detroit Free Press (primary only)

==== Polling ====
Poll source	Date(s) administered	Sample size	Margin of error	Mary Draves	Anthony Hudson	Paul Junge	Nikki Snyder	Undecided
UpONE (R) (Note: Poll sponsored by Junge's campaign)	June 1–4, 2024	341 (RV)	± 5.3%	11%	1%	53%	–	35%
UpONE (R)	April 20–22, 2024	300 (LV)	± 5.6%	1%	2%	42%	8%	47%

==== Fundraising ====
Campaign finance reports as of March 31, 2024
Candidate	Raised	Spent	Cash on hand
Anthony Hudson (R)	$29,238	$14,797	$12,298
Paul Junge (R)	$1,116,775 (Note: $300,355 of this total was self-funded by Junge.)	$108,015	$1,101,041
Nikki Snyder (R)	$211,286 (Note: $50,280 of this total was self-funded by Snyder.)	$120,722	$90,563
Martin Blank (R)	$8,671	$7,331	$1,341
Source: Federal Election Commission

==== Results ====
Republican primary results
Party	Candidate	Votes	%
Republican	Paul Junge	43,204	74.8
Republican	Mary Draves	8,688	15.1
Republican	Anthony Hudson	5,851	10.1
Total votes		57,743	100.0

=== General election ===
==== Post-primary endorsements ====
Kristen McDonald Rivet

Organizations

- Michigan Fraternal Order of Police

==== Predictions ====
Source	Ranking	As of
The Cook Political Report	Tossup	November 16, 2023
Inside Elections	Tilt D	October 31, 2024
Sabato's Crystal Ball	Lean D	November 4, 2024
Elections Daily	Lean D	November 4, 2024
CNalysis	Tilt D	November 4, 2024

==== Polling ====
Poll source	Date(s) administered	Sample size	Margin of error	Kristen McDonald Rivet (D)	Paul Junge (R)	Undecided
NMB Research (R) (Note: Poll commissioned by the National Republican Congressional Committee)	October 13–15, 2024	400 (LV)	± 4.9%	40%	41%	19% (Note: "Other" with 6%)
Global Strategy Group (D)	July 29 – August 1, 2024	500 (LV)	± 4.4%	44%	45%	11%
UpONE (R)	June 1–4, 2024	400 (RV)	± 4.9%	39%	42%	19%

Hypothetical polling

Kristen McDonald Rivet vs. Mary Draves

Poll source	Date(s) administered	Sample size	Margin of error	Kristen McDonald Rivet (D)	Mary Draves (R)	Undecided
UpONE (R)	June 1–4, 2024	400 (RV)	± 4.9%	40%	32%	28%

==== Results ====
2024 Michigan's 8th congressional district election
Party	Candidate	Votes	%
Democratic	Kristen McDonald Rivet	217,490	51.3
Republican	Paul Junge	189,317	44.6
Working Class	Kathy Goodwin	8,492	2.0
Libertarian	Steve Barcelo	4,768	1.1
U.S. Taxpayers'	James Allen Little	2,681	0.6
Green	Jim Casha	1,602	0.4
Total votes		424,350	100.0
Democratic hold			

== District 9 ==
2024 Michigan's 9th congressional district election
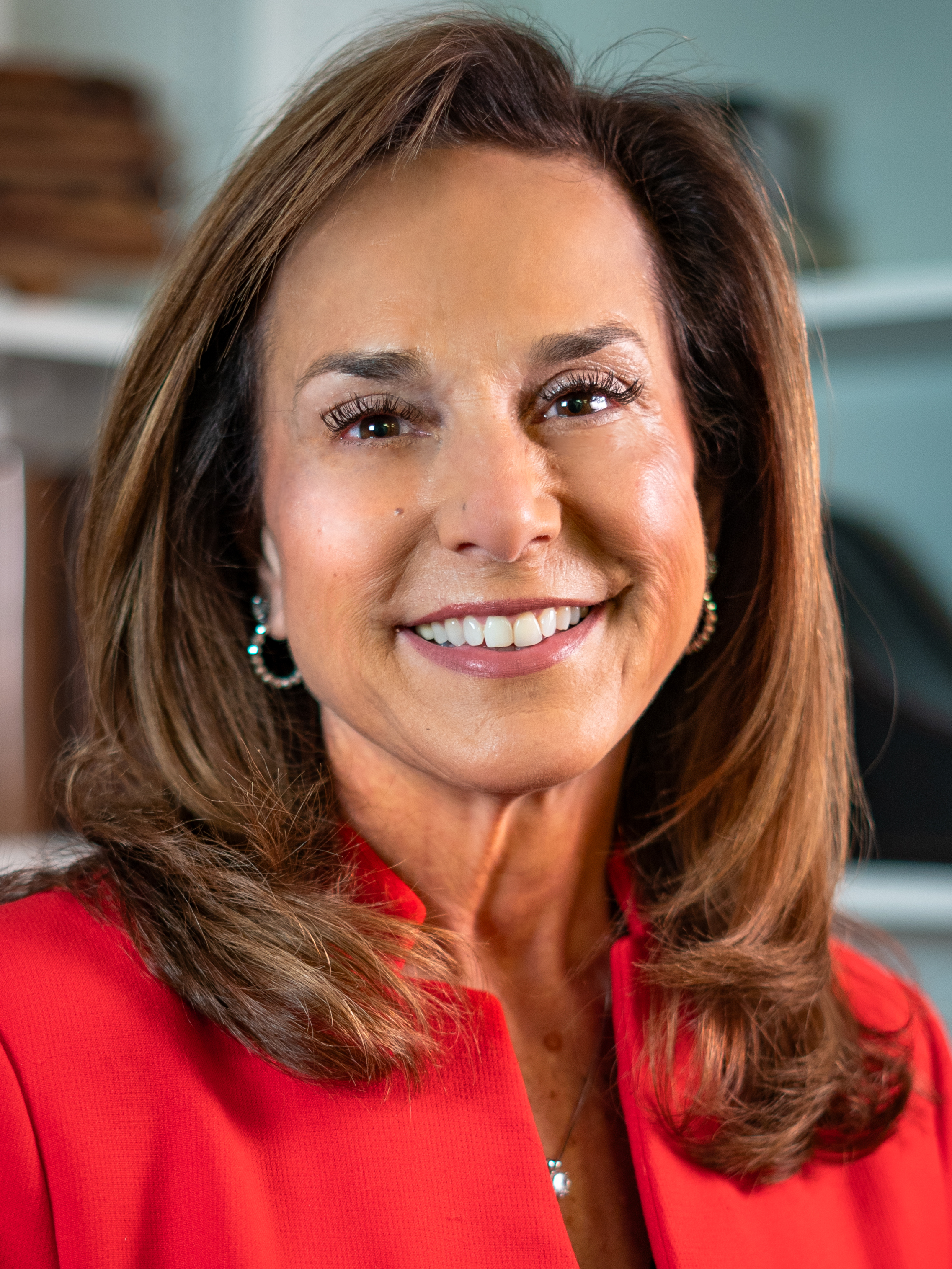

Nominee	Lisa McClain	Clinton St. Mosley
Party	Republican	Democratic
Popular vote	312,593	138,138
Percentage	66.8%	29.5%
- County results McClain: 60–70% 70–80%
U.S. Representative before election
Lisa McClain
Republican
Elected U.S. Representative
Lisa McClain
Republican

The 9th district is based in The Thumb region, including Port Huron as well as the northern Detroit exurbs in Oakland and Macomb counties. The incumbent was Republican Lisa McClain, who was re-elected with 63.9% of the vote in 2022.

=== Republican primary ===
==== Nominee ====
- Lisa McClain, incumbent U.S. representative

==== Endorsements ====
Lisa McClain

Organizations

- AIPAC
- Maggie's List

==== Fundraising ====
Campaign finance reports as of March 31, 2024
Candidate	Raised	Spent	Cash on hand
Lisa McClain (R)	$889,730	$1,261,498	$544,735
Source: Federal Election Commission

==== Results ====
Republican primary results
Party	Candidate	Votes	%
Republican	Lisa McClain (incumbent)	97,611	100.0
Total votes		97,611	100.0

=== Democratic primary ===
==== Nominee ====
- Clinton St. Mosley, insurance agent

==== Fundraising ====
Campaign finance reports as of March 31, 2024
Candidate	Raised	Spent	Cash on hand
Clinton St. Mosley (D)	$885	$448	$407
Source: Federal Election Commission

==== Results ====
Democratic primary results
Party	Candidate	Votes	%
Democratic	Clinton St. Mosley	41,492	100.0
Total votes		41,492	100.0

=== General election ===
==== Predictions ====
Source	Ranking	As of
The Cook Political Report	Solid R	November 16, 2023
Inside Elections	Solid R	November 16, 2023
Sabato's Crystal Ball	Safe R	November 16, 2023
Elections Daily	Safe R	February 5, 2024
CNalysis	Solid R	November 16, 2023

==== Results ====
2024 Michigan's 9th congressional district election
Party	Candidate	Votes	%
Republican	Lisa McClain (incumbent)	312,593	66.8
Democratic	Clinton St. Mosley	138,138	29.5
Working Class	Jim Walkowicz	12,169	2.6
Libertarian	Kevin Vayko	5,338	1.1
Total votes		468,238	100.0
Republican hold			

== District 10 ==
2024 Michigan's 10th congressional district election
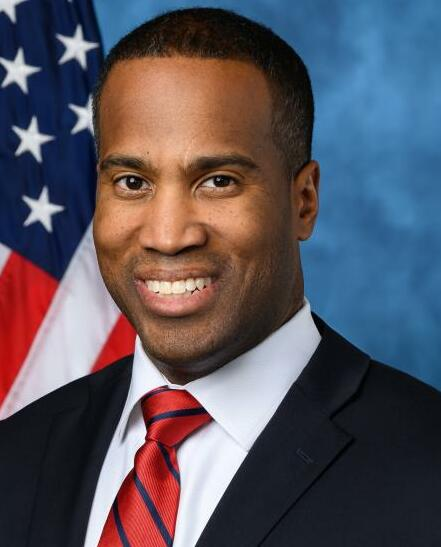

Nominee	John James	Carl Marlinga
Party	Republican	Democratic
Popular vote	217,437	191,363
Percentage	51.1%	45.0%
- County results James: 50–60%
U.S. Representative before election
John James
Republican
Elected U.S. Representative
John James
Republican

The 10th district is based primarily in southeastern Michigan's Macomb County, taking in Warren and Sterling Heights, as well as a small portion of eastern Oakland County. The incumbent was Republican John James, who was elected with 48.8% of the vote in 2022. For the 2024 election, this district was considered to be one of the most competitive in the state, as James had been elected two years previously with a 0.5% margin. However, he expanded upon that in the 2024 election, winning with a 6.1% margin. Uniquely, all four nominee candidates were the same as the previous election.

=== Republican primary ===
==== Nominee ====
- John James, incumbent U.S. representative

==== Endorsements ====
John James

Executive branch officials

- John Bolton, national security advisor (2018–2019), United States ambassador to the United Nations (2005–2006)

Organizations

- AIPAC
- Americans for Prosperity
- Republican Jewish Coalition
- With Honor Fund

==== Fundraising ====
Campaign finance reports as of March 31, 2024
Candidate	Raised	Spent	Cash on hand
John James (R)	$4,384,667	$2,221,591	$2,958,581
Source: Federal Election Commission

==== Results ====
Republican primary results
Party	Candidate	Votes	%
Republican	John James (incumbent)	52,871	100.0
Total votes		52,871	100.0

=== Democratic primary ===
==== Nominee ====
- Carl Marlinga, former Macomb County prosecuting attorney and nominee for this district in 2002 and 2022

==== Eliminated in primary ====
- Emily Busch, sales manager and gun control activist
- Tiffany Tilley, member of the Michigan State Board of Education
- Diane Young, financial planner

==== Disqualified ====
- Anil Kumar, member of the Wayne State University Board of Governors, nominee for the 11th district in 2016 and candidate in 2014
- Rhonda Powell, former director of the Macomb County Health Department and candidate for this district in 2022

==== Declined ====
- Kevin Hertel, state senator
- Andy Levin, former U.S. representative for the 9th district (2019–2023)

==== Endorsements ====
Emily Busch

U.S. representatives

- Gabby Giffords, U.S. representative from Arizona's 8th congressional district (2007–2012)

Organizations

- Brady PAC
- Everytown for Gun Safety
- Giffords
Carl Marlinga

Statewide officials

- Gretchen Whitmer, governor of Michigan (2019–present) (post-primary)

Organizations

- Vote Common Good

Labor unions

- Michigan Education Association
- National Education Association
Diane Young

Individuals

- Howie Klein, former president of Reprise Records (1989–2001) and adjunct professor at McGill University
- Heather Digby Parton, political blogger

Organizations

- Patriotic Millionaires

==== Fundraising ====
Campaign finance reports as of March 31, 2024
Candidate	Raised	Spent	Cash on hand
Emily Busch (D)	$388,608	$251,748	$136,860
Brian Jaye (D)	$15,204 (Note: $10,180 of this total was self-funded by Jaye.)	$10,173	$5,031
Anil Kumar (D)	$1,306,553 (Note: $878,500 of this total was self-funded by Kumar.)	$260,540	$1,046,013
Carl Marlinga (D)	$468,708	$294,327	$180,288
Rhonda Powell (D)	$31,368 (Note: $4,822 of this total was self-funded by Powell.)	$25,665	$2,694
Tiffany Tilley (D)	$46,522	$35,883	$10,639
Diane Young (D)	$370,180 (Note: $32,125 of this total was self-funded by Young.)	$243,695	$126,485
Source: Federal Election Commission

==== Results ====
Democratic primary results
Party	Candidate	Votes	%
Democratic	Carl Marlinga	32,561	49.1
Democratic	Diane Young	16,282	24.6
Democratic	Tiffany Tilley	8,861	13.4
Democratic	Emily Busch	8,541	12.9
Total votes		66,245	100.0

=== Polling ===
Poll source	Date(s) administered	Sample size	Margin of error	Emily Busch	Anil Kumar	Carl Marlinga	Rhonda Powell	Tiffany Tilley	Diane Young	Undecided
Public Policy Polling (D) (Note: Poll sponsored by Marlinga's campaign)	January 22–24, 2024	458 (LV)	—	4%	2%	30%	3%	4%	4%	55%
GQR	August 21–22, 2023	411 (LV)	± 4.82%	3%	3%	31%	2%	5%	3%	53%

=== General election ===
==== Predictions ====
Source	Ranking	As of
The Cook Political Report	Lean R	November 16, 2023
Inside Elections	Lean R	May 9, 2024
Sabato's Crystal Ball	Lean R	November 16, 2023
Elections Daily	Lean R	February 5, 2024
CNalysis	Tilt R	November 16, 2023

==== Polling ====
Poll source	Date(s) administered	Sample size	Margin of error	John James (R)	Carl Marlinga (D)	Undecided
DCCC (D)	October 15–18, 2024	388 (LV)	–	47%	47%	6%
Glengariff Group (Note: Poll sponsored by The Detroit News and WDIV-TV)	October 14–16, 2024	400 (LV)	± 4.9%	47%	44%	9% (Note: Kirby (WCP) with 2%; Saliba (L) with 1%)
Global Strategy Group (D) (Note: Poll sponsored by House Majority PAC, which supports Democratic candidates.)	August 8–12, 2024	330 (LV)	± 4.4%	47%	44%	9%
Target Insyght (D) (Note: Poll sponsored by Deadline Detroit)	July 14–15, 2024	400 (LV)	± 5.0%	43%	49%	8%

==== Results ====
2024 Michigan 10th congressional district election
Party	Candidate	Votes	%
Republican	John James (incumbent)	217,437	51.1
Democratic	Carl Marlinga	191,363	45.0
Working Class	Andrea L. Kirby	11,162	2.6
Libertarian	Mike Saliba	5,339	1.3
Total votes		425,301	100.0
Republican hold			

== District 11 ==
2024 Michigan's 11th congressional district election
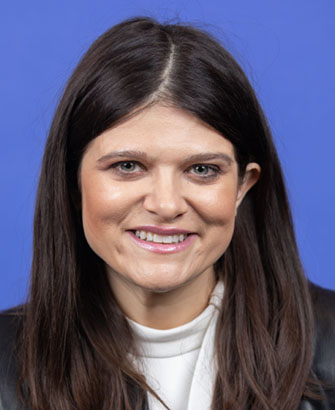

Nominee	Haley Stevens	Nick Somberg
Party	Democratic	Republican
Popular vote	260,780	177,432
Percentage	58.2%	39.6%
- Precinct results Stevens: 40–50% 50–60% 60–70% 70–80% 80–90% >90% Somberg: 40–50% 50–60% 60–70% >90% Tie
U.S. Representative before election
Haley Stevens
Democratic
Elected U.S. Representative
Haley Stevens
Democratic

The 11th district is based solely in Oakland County and includes the cities of Royal Oak and Pontiac. The incumbent was Democrat Haley Stevens, who was re-elected with 61.32% of the vote in 2022.

=== Democratic primary ===
==== Nominee ====
- Haley Stevens, incumbent U.S. representative

==== Eliminated in primary ====
- Ahmed Ghanim, healthcare management professional

=== Endorsements ===
Haley Stevens

Organizations

- AIPAC
- Bend the Arc
- Democratic Majority for Israel
- Feminist Majority PAC
- Giffords
- Humane Society Legislative Fund
- Jewish Democratic Council of America
- Joint Action Committee for Political Affairs
- League of Conservation Voters
- Natural Resources Defense Council
- Population Connection Action Fund
- Pro-Israel America
- Sierra Club

Labor unions

- Michigan AFL-CIO
- Michigan Education Association
- National Education Association
- U.S. Chamber of Commerce

==== Fundraising ====
Campaign finance reports as of March 31, 2024
Candidate	Raised	Spent	Cash on hand
Haley Stevens (D)	$1,439,306	$865,187	$581,102
Source: Federal Election Commission

==== Results ====
Results by precinct Stevens: 60–70%; 70–80%; 80–90%; 90–100%

Democratic primary results
Party	Candidate	Votes	%
Democratic	Haley Stevens (incumbent)	83,571	87.1
Democratic	Ahmed Ghanim	12,391	12.9
Total votes		95,962	100.0

=== Republican primary ===
==== Nominee ====
- Nick Somberg, attorney

==== Eliminated in primary ====
- Charles Frangie, attorney

==== Results ====
Republican primary results
Party	Candidate	Votes	%
Republican	Nick Somberg	24,222	60.6
Republican	Charles Frangie	15,755	39.4
Total votes		39,977	100.0

=== General election ===
==== Predictions ====
Source	Ranking	As of
The Cook Political Report	Solid D	November 16, 2023
Inside Elections	Solid D	November 16, 2023
Sabato's Crystal Ball	Safe D	November 16, 2023
Elections Daily	Safe D	February 5, 2024
CNalysis	Solid D	November 16, 2023

==== Results ====
2024 Michigan's 11th congressional district election
Party	Candidate	Votes	%
Democratic	Haley Stevens (incumbent)	260,780	58.2
Republican	Nick Somberg	177,432	39.6
Green	Douglas Campbell	9,713	2.2
Total votes		447,925	100.0
Democratic hold			

== District 12 ==
2024 Michigan's 12th congressional district election
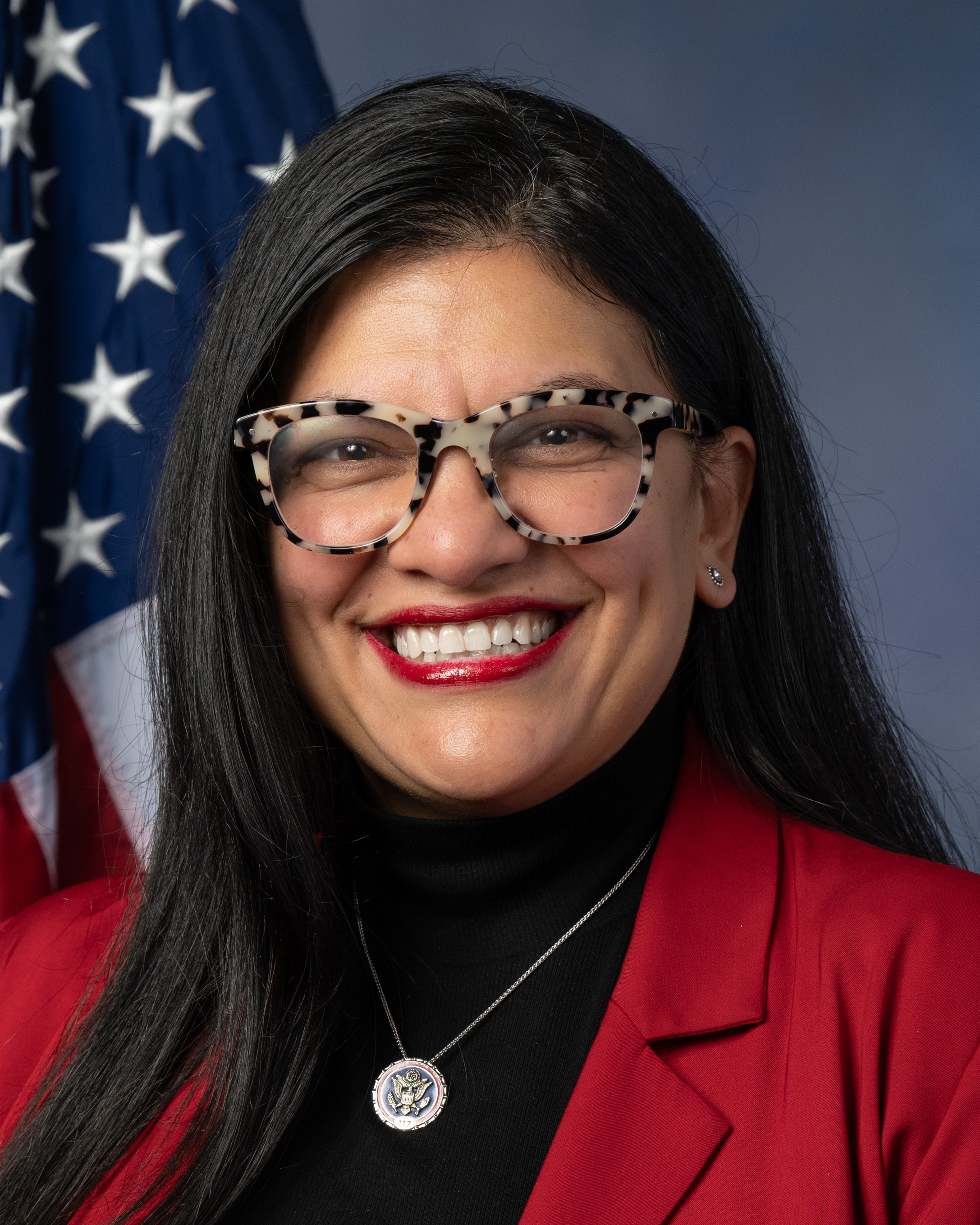

Nominee	Rashida Tlaib	James Hooper
Party	Democratic	Republican
Popular vote	253,354	92,490
Percentage	69.7%	25.4%
- County results Tlaib: 60–70% 70–80%
U.S. Representative before election
Rashida Tlaib
Democratic
Elected U.S. Representative
Rashida Tlaib
Democratic

The 12th district is based in northern Wayne County and includes the cities of Dearborn and Southfield. The incumbent was Democrat Rashida Tlaib, who was re-elected with 70.8% of the vote in 2022.

=== Democratic primary ===
==== Nominee ====
- Rashida Tlaib, incumbent U.S. representative

==== Disqualified ====
- Ryan Foster, teacher

==== Declined ====
- Nasser Beydoun, businessman, former executive director of the Arab American Chamber of Commerce, and Republican candidate for U.S. Senate in 2006 (ran for U.S. Senate)
- Hill Harper, actor and former member of the President's Cancer Panel (ran for U.S. Senate)
- Adam Hollier, former director of the Michigan Veterans Affairs Agency, former state senator, and candidate for the 13th district in 2022 (ran in the 13th district)

==== Endorsements ====
Rashida Tlaib

Organizations

- Democratic Socialists of America
- Feminist Majority PAC
- Friends of the Earth Action
- Humane Society Legislative Fund
- Jewish Voice for Peace Action fund
- Justice Democrats
- NextGen America PAC
- Our Revolution
- Peace Action
- People's Action
- Sierra Club
- Sunrise Movement
- Working Families Party

Labor unions

- Association of Flight Attendants
- Michigan Education Association
- National Education Association

==== Fundraising ====
Campaign finance reports as of March 31, 2024
Candidate	Raised	Spent	Cash on hand
Rashida Tlaib (D)	$6,552,315	$1,558,722	$5,230,897
Source: Federal Election Commission

==== Results ====
Democratic primary results
Party	Candidate	Votes	%
Democratic	Rashida Tlaib (incumbent)	84,138	100.0
Total votes		84,138	100.0

=== Republican primary ===
==== Nominee ====
- James Hooper, tradesman and candidate for this district in 2022

==== Eliminated in primary ====
- Linda Sawyer, retired nurse and Wayne County Republican Party committee member and candidate for the 13th district in 2020

==== Disqualified ====
- Steven Elliott, laser treatment business owner and nominee for this district in 2022
- Hassan Nehme, electrical engineer

==== Fundraising ====
Campaign finance reports as of March 31, 2024
Candidate	Raised	Spent	Cash on hand
Steven Elliott (R)	$23,575	$26,569	$1,288
James Hooper (R)	$0	$0	$2,647
Source: Federal Election Commission

==== Results ====
Republican primary results
Party	Candidate	Votes	%
Republican	James Hooper	12,001	60.5
Republican	Linda Sawyer	7,828	39.5
Total votes		19,829	100.0

=== General election ===
==== Predictions ====
Source	Ranking	As of
The Cook Political Report	Solid D	November 16, 2023
Inside Elections	Solid D	November 16, 2023
Sabato's Crystal Ball	Safe D	November 16, 2023
Elections Daily	Safe D	February 5, 2024
CNalysis	Solid D	November 16, 2023

==== Results ====
2024 Michigan's 12th congressional district election
Party	Candidate	Votes	%
Democratic	Rashida Tlaib (incumbent)	253,354	69.7
Republican	James Hooper	92,490	25.4
Working Class	Gary Walkowicz	9,401	2.6
Green	Brenda K. Sanders	8,254	2.3
Total votes		363,499	100.0
Democratic hold			

== District 13 ==
2024 Michigan's 13th congressional district election
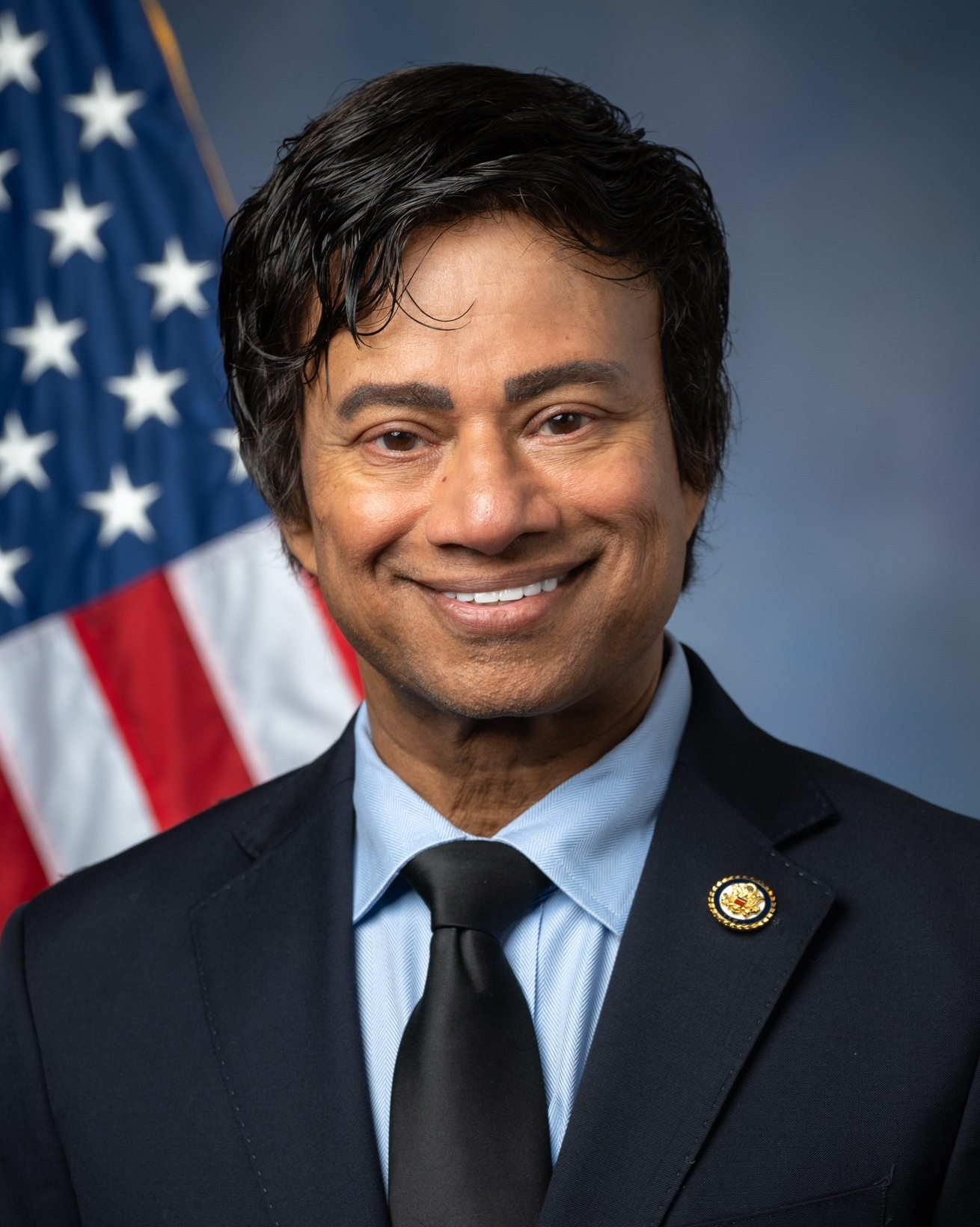

Nominee	Shri Thanedar	Martell Bivings
Party	Democratic	Republican
Popular vote	220,788	78,917
Percentage	68.6%	24.5%
- County results Thanedar: 60–70%
U.S. Representative before election
Shri Thanedar
Democratic
Elected U.S. Representative
Shri Thanedar
Democratic

The 13th district is based solely in Wayne County and includes most of Detroit and the cities of Taylor and Romulus. The incumbent was Democrat Shri Thanedar, who was elected with 71.1% of the vote in 2022.

=== Democratic primary ===
Thanedar was considered vulnerable to a primary challenge, as he was one of only two non-Black members of Congress representing a majority-black district, the other being Steve Cohen of Tennessee. Thanedar won his 2022 primary with a low plurality against several Black candidates.

==== Nominee ====
- Shri Thanedar, incumbent U.S. representative

==== Eliminated in primary ====
- Shakira Hawkins, former Southfield city clerk
- Mary Waters, at-large Detroit city councilor (2022–present), former state representative from the 4th district (2001–2006), candidate for this district in 2008, and candidate for the 14th district in 2012

==== Disqualified ====
- Mohammed Alam, IT professional and perennial candidate
- Adam Hollier, former director of the Michigan Veterans Affairs Agency, former state senator from the 2nd district (2018–2022), and candidate for this district in 2022

==== Endorsements ====
Shri Thanedar

U.S. representatives

- Pete Aguilar, U.S. representative from California's 33rd congressional district (2015–present) and chair of the House Democratic Caucus (2023–present)
- Katherine Clark, U.S. representative from Massachusetts's 5th congressional district (2013–present) and House minority whip (2023–present)
- Hakeem Jeffries, U.S. representative from New York's 8th congressional district (2013–present) and House minority leader (2023-present)

Organizations

- AIPAC
- Asian American Action Fund
- Hindu American PAC
- Sierra Club
- Vote Common Good

Labor unions

- Michigan Education Association
- National Education Association
Mary Waters

State legislators

- Abraham Aiyash, majority leader of the Michigan House of Representatives (2023–present) from the 9th district (2020–present)
- Tyrone Carter, state representative from the 6th district (2019–present) (previously endorsed Hollier)
- Kimberly Edwards, state representative from the 12th district (2023–present)
- Alabas Farhat, state representative from the 3rd district (2023–present)
- Sherry Gay-Dagnogo, former state representative from the 8th district (2015–2021)
- Karen Whitsett, state representative from the 4th district (2019–present)

County officials

- Abdul El-Sayed, director of the Wayne County Department of Health, Human and Veterans Services
- Warren Evans, Wayne County executive (2015–present)

Local officials

- Scott Benson, Detroit city councilor from the 3rd district (2014–present) (previously endorsed Hollier)
- Mike Duggan, mayor of Detroit (2014–present)
- Fred Durhal III, Detroit city councilor from the 7th district (2021–present) (previously endorsed Hollier)
- Latisha Johnson, Detroit city councilor from the 4th district (2022–present)
- Angela Whitfield-Calloway, Detroit city councilor from the 2nd district (2022–present)
- Coleman Young II, Detroit city councilor from the at-large district (2022–present)

Individuals

- Nasser Beydoun, businessman

Labor unions

- United Auto Workers
Adam Hollier (disqualified)

U.S. executive officials

- James Blanchard, former U.S. ambassador to Canada (1993–1996) and former governor of Michigan (1983–1991)

U.S. representatives

- Joyce Beatty, U.S. representative from Ohio's 3rd congressional district (2013–present)
- Steven Horsford, U.S. representative from Nevada's 4th congressional district (2013–2015, 2019–present)
- Brenda Lawrence, U.S. representative from Michigan's 14th congressional district (2015–2023)
- Gwen Moore, U.S. representative from Wisconsin's 4th congressional district (2005–present)

Statewide officials

- Jocelyn Benson, Michigan secretary of state (2019–present)
- Austin Davis, lieutenant governor of Pennsylvania (2022–present)
- Keith Ellison, attorney general of Minnesota (2019–present)

State legislators

- Sarah Anthony, state senator from the 21st district (2023–present)
- ~~Tyrone Carter, state representative from the 6th district (2019–present)~~ (switched endorsement to Waters)
- Erika Geiss, state senator from the 10th district (2018–present)
- Mallory McMorrow, state senator from the 8th district (2019–present)
- Dayna Polehanki, state senator from the 5th district (2019–present)
- Sylvia Santana, state senator from the 2nd district (2019–present)
- Joe Tate, speaker of the Michigan House of Representatives (2023–present) from the 10th district (2019–present)

Local officials

- ~~Scott Benson, Detroit city councilor from the 3rd district (2014–present)~~ (switched endorsement to Waters)
- Dave Bing, former mayor of Detroit (2009–2014)
- ~~Fred Durhal III, Detroit city councilor from the 7th district (2021–present)~~ (switched endorsement to Waters)
- Warren Evans, Wayne County executive (2015–present)

Organizations

- Congressional Black Caucus
- VoteVets
- With Honor Fund

===== Fundraising =====
Campaign finance reports as of March 31, 2024
Candidate	Raised	Spent	Cash on hand
Adam Hollier (D)	$790,820	$236,774	$570,207
Shri Thanedar (D)	$5,270,911 (Note: $3,350,000 of this total was self-funded by Thanedar.)	$287,646	$5,100,462
Mary Waters (D)	$9,811	$4,730	$5,081
Source: Federal Election Commission

==== Results ====
Democratic primary results
Party	Candidate	Votes	%
Democratic	Shri Thanedar (incumbent)	44,546	54.9
Democratic	Mary Waters	27,408	33.8
Democratic	Shakira Hawkins	9,171	11.3
Total votes		81,125	100.0

=== Republican primary ===
==== Nominee ====
- Martell Bivings, policy analyst and candidate for this district in 2022

===== Fundraising =====
Campaign finance reports as of March 31, 2024
Candidate	Raised	Spent	Cash on hand
Martell Bivings (R)	$322	$677	$0
Source: Federal Election Commission

==== Results ====
Republican primary results
Party	Candidate	Votes	%
Republican	Martell Bivings	13,419	100.0
Total votes		13,419	100.0

=== General election ===
==== Predictions ====
Source	Ranking	As of
The Cook Political Report	Solid D	November 16, 2023
Inside Elections	Solid D	November 16, 2023
Sabato's Crystal Ball	Safe D	November 16, 2023
Elections Daily	Safe D	February 5, 2024
CNalysis	Solid D	November 16, 2023

==== Results ====
2024 Michigan's 13th congressional district election
Party	Candidate	Votes	%
Democratic	Shri Thanedar (incumbent)	220,788	68.6
Republican	Martel Bivings	78,917	24.5
Working Class	Simone R. Coleman	13,367	4.2
Libertarian	Chris Clark	5,726	1.8
U.S. Taxpayers'	Chris Dardzinski	2,825	0.9
Write-in		26	0.0
Total votes		321,649	100.0
Democratic hold			

== Notes ==
Partisan clients
