= Spark (American organization) =

US Trotskyist organization

The Spark
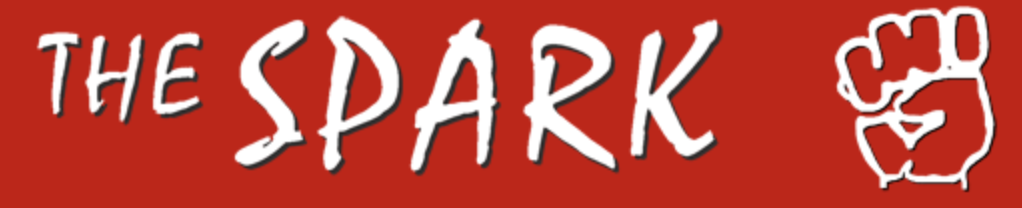
- Founded: 1968; 58 years ago
- Split from: Spartacist League
- Newspaper: The Spark
- Ideology: Trotskyism; Communism
- Political position: Far-left
- International affiliation: Internationalist Communist Union

Website
- the-spark.net

The Spark is a Trotskyist group in the United States aligned internationally with the Lutte Ouvrière tendency.

== History ==
=== Origins ===
Spark originated as a "faction" within the Spartacist League that was attracted to the French group Voix Ouvrière's method of propagandizing in the factories. They allied themselves with the Turnerites against the leadership, but left independently before the League expelled the Turnerites late in 1968. This tendency formally organized as "Spark" in 1971, with two locals in Detroit and Baltimore.

The organization began a monthly magazine The Spark in July 1971, which became a biweekly in early 1976. It also produced a variety of newsletters based at local factories, such as the Ford Spark, Eldon Spark etc. Another magazine, Class Struggle, began in 1980.

The movement was wary of becoming too enmeshed in "petty bourgeois" movements - members wished to firmly base themselves in the proletariat. But neither did they completely eschew work in such movements. For instance, referring to the anti-nuclear movement of the late 1970s and early 1980s, they proclaimed "They should participate in its activities when such participation does not detract from their basic activity in the working class. But we must be clear that the building of a revolutionary organization rooted in the working class comes before participation in any petty bourgeoisie movement". In mid-1982 Spark had locals in Baltimore, Detroit, Chicago and New York.

=== Working Class Party ===
Members of the Spark are active in the Working Class Party. The party originated from a campaign initiated by members of the Spark. The party ran its first candidates in 2014 in Michigan (as independents, as the party did not have ballot access yet). However, a petition drive to get ballot access was successful in 2016.

== Publications ==
- The people's democracies: are they socialist states?: the meaning of their present evolution toward a liberation by Voix Ouvriere Detroit, MI: The Spark, 1966
- For a Trotskyist Organization in the Working Class Baltimore: The Spark, 1971
- The double nature of the mass communist parties Detroit, MI: The Spark, 1976
- Workers states or bourgeois?: what determines the class nature of a state? Detroit, MI: The Spark, 1976
- Revolutionaries and Trade Union Activity: reprints of articles from the class struggle Detroit, MI: The Spark, 1977
