= Working Class Party =

Socialist party in the United States

- Abbreviation: WCP
- Founded: 2014; 12 years ago
- Ideology: Progressivism; Socialism; Trotskyism
- Political position: Left-wing
- US House of Representatives: 0 / 13
- US Senate: 0 / 2
- Michigan House of Representatives: 0 / 110
- Michigan Senate: 0 / 38
- Michigan statewide offices: 0 / 4

Website
- workingclassfight.com

The Working Class Party (WCP) is a left-wing political party in the United States, based in Detroit, Michigan. WCP first gained ballot access in 2016. WCP supports progressive, pro-labor and socialist policies and candidates.

The party was created by Trotskyist newspaper The Spark and its supporters, which continues to endorse the party.

== History ==
From 2011 to 2013, The Spark conducted a campaign to encourage the working class to organize independent of the Democratic Party. In 2014, five people active in that campaign ran for office as Independent candidates. Four candidates lost. David Roehrig won his campaign for Wayne County Community College Trustee, due to his only opponent (the Democratic incumbent) being disqualified before the election.

In 2016, several dozen WCP volunteers turned in more than 50,000 signatures, above the required 31,566, which enabled WCP candidates to appear as party candidates on Michigan ballots.

In 2016, Mary Anne Hering won enough votes for Board of Education for WCP to keep ballot access in the 2018 Michigan elections.

== Ideology ==
The WCP argues that neither major party represents the interests of the working class, because both the Democrats and the Republicans are controlled by the financial elite. In the WCP's party program, it supports a living wage tied to inflation and full employment through reductions in working time. The WCP holds that the working class "won't change our situation with an election", but can "use this election to say there are [...] tens of thousands of people who agree with this program for the crisis".

== Election results ==
The WCP has fielded electoral candidates in the United States for local, state, and federal offices. WCP candidates usually run as official WCP candidates on their own ballot line.

No WCP candidate has yet won a contested election, however one WCP candidate won an uncontested election for the Wayne County Community College Board in 2014.

As of November 2022, the party has ballot access in Illinois, Maryland, and Michigan. As of August 2026, 5,207 voters were affiliated with the WCP in Maryland.

=== Congressional elections ===
Year	Candidate	Chamber	State	District	Votes	%	Result	Notes	Ref
2024	Ed Hershey	House	Illinois	4th	10,704	5.2%	Lost		
2024	Simone R. Coleman	House	Michigan	13th	13,367	4.2%	Lost		
2024	Gary Walkowicz	House	Michigan	12th	9,401	2.6%	Lost		
2024	Andrea L. Kirby	House	Michigan	10th	11,162	2.6%	Lost		
2024	Jim Walkowicz	House	Michigan	9th	12,169	2.6%	Lost		
2024	Kathy Goodwin	House	Michigan	8th	8,492	2.0%	Lost		
2024	Louis Palus	House	Michigan	3rd	5,546	1.3%	Lost		
2024	Liz Hakola	House	Michigan	1st	8,497	1.8%	Lost		
2024	Juan Rey	House	California	37th	44,450	21.7%	Lost	General Election	
2024	Juan Rey	House	California	37th	8,910	10.3%	Advanced to general election	Nonpartisan blanket primary	
2022	Simone R. Coleman	House	Michigan	13th	8,811	3.8%	Lost		
2022	Gary Walkowicz	House	Michigan	12th	8,046	2.9%	Lost		
2022	Andrea L. Kirby	House	Michigan	10th	5,905	1.8%	Lost		
2022	Jim Walkowicz	House	Michigan	9th	6,570	1.8%	Lost		
2022	Kathy Goodwin	House	Michigan	8th	9,077	2.7%	Lost		
2022	Louis Palus	House	Michigan	3rd	4,192	1.3%	Lost		
2022	Liz Hakola	House	Michigan	1st	5,480	1.4%	Lost		
2022	Ed Hershey	House	Illinois	4th	4,503	3.4%	Lost		
2020	Philip Kolody	House	Michigan	14th	2,534	0.7%	Lost		
2020	Sam Johnson	House	Michigan	13th	5,284	1.8%	Lost		
2020	Gary Walkowicz	House	Michigan	12th	11,147	2.9%	Lost		
2020	Andrea Kirby	House	Michigan	9th	8,970	2.2%	Lost		
2020	Kathy Goodwin	House	Michigan	5th	8,180	2.3%	Lost		
2018	Philip Kolody	House	Michigan	14th	4,761	1.8%	Lost		
2018	Sam Johnson	House	Michigan	13th	22,186	11.3%	Lost		
2018	Gary Walkowicz	House	Michigan	12th	6,712	2.3%	Lost		
2018	Andrea Kirby	House	Michigan	9th	6,797	2.2%	Lost		
2018	Kathy Goodwin	House	Michigan	5th	12,646	4.6%	Lost		
2018	Juan Rey	House	California	29th	944	1.4%	Lost	Nonpartisan blanket primary	
2016	Sam Johnson	House	Michigan	13th	8,835	3.4%	Lost		
2016	Gary Walkowicz	House	Michigan	12th	9,183	2.8%	Lost		
2014	Gary Walkowicz	House	Michigan	12th	5,039	2.4%	Lost		
2014	Sam Johnson	House	Michigan	13th	3,466	2.1%	Lost		

=== Statewide elections ===
Year	Candidate	Office	State	District	Votes	%	Result	Notes	Ref
2024	Suzanne Roehrig	Wayne State University Board of Governors	Michigan	At-Large	180,581	1.8%	Lost		
2024	Mary Ann Hering	Board of Education	Michigan	At-Large	234,584	2.3%	Lost		
2022	Mary Anne Hering	Board of Education	Michigan	At-Large	135,442	1.6%	Lost		
2022	David Harding	Governor	Maryland	At-Large	17,154	0.86%	Lost		
2020	Mary Anne Hering	Board of Education	Michigan	At-Large	147,345	1.4%	Lost		
2020	Hali McEachern	Board of Education	Michigan	At-Large	82,700	0.8%	Lost		
2018	Mary Anne Hering	Board of Education	Michigan	At-Large	125,693	1.7%	Lost		
2018	Logan Smith	Board of Education	Michigan	At-Large	91,077	1.3%	Lost		
2016	Mary Anne Hering	Board of Education	Michigan	At-Large	224,392	2.66%	Lost		

=== State legislature elections ===
Year	Candidate	Office	State	District	Votes	%	Result	Notes	Ref
2024	Linda Green Harris	House	Michigan	16th district	2,050	4.2%	Lost		
2024	Hashim Malik Bakari	House	Michigan	13th district	1,430	2.9%	Lost		
2024	Logan Ausherman	House	Michigan	8th district	1,402	3.3%	Lost		
2024	Linda Rayburn	House	Michigan	7th district	1,740	6.0%	Lost		
2024	Larry Darnell Betts	House	Michigan	3rd district	1,112	4.4%	Lost		
2024	Mark DaSacco	House	Michigan	2nd district	2,450	5.8%	Lost		
2022	Kimberly Givens	Senate	Michigan	6th district	3,396	3.1%	Lost		
2022	Linda Rayburn	Senate	Michigan	3rd district	10,214	14.3%	Lost		
2022	Larry Darnell Betts	Senate	Michigan	2nd district	1,636	2.6%	Lost		
2020	Louis Palus	House	Michigan	75th district	1,234	3.0%	Lost		
2020	Larry Darnell Betts	House	Michigan	15th district	970	2.4%	Lost		
2020	Simone R. Coleman	House	Michigan	14th district	1,937	4.7%	Lost		
2020	Kimberly Givens	House	Michigan	7th district	1,224	3.5%	Lost		
2020	Linda Rayburn	House	Michigan	4th district	1,023	3.3%	Lost		
2018	Louis Palus	Senate	Michigan	29th district	1,445	1.2%	Lost		
2018	Thomas Repasky	Senate	Michigan	18th district	2,954	2.3%	Lost		
2018	Larry Betts	Senate	Michigan	5th district	3,944	4.4%	Lost		
2018	Hali McEachern	Senate	Michigan	3rd district	2,095	2.9%	Lost		

=== Local elections ===
Year	Candidate	Office	Area	District	Votes	%	Result	Notes	Ref
2020	David Harding	Mayor	Baltimore, MD	At-Large	3,973	1.7%	Lost		
2016	David Harding	Baltimore City Council	Baltimore	14th district	1,426	8.3%	Lost		
2015	Ed Hershey	City Council	Chicago	25th ward	614	8.2%	Lost		
2014	Mary Anne Hering	School Board	Dearborn, MI	At-Large	5,153	9.93%	Lost	3 seats to be filled	
2014	Kenneth Jannot	School Board	Dearborn, MI	At-Large	2,431	4.69%	Lost	3 seats to be filled	
2014	David A. Roehrig	Community College Board	Wayne County, MI	2nd	15,661	96.5%	Won	ran unopposed	

== See also ==
- The Spark (US Trotskyist group associated with the Lutte Ouvrière tendency)
