= Racquel Berry-Benjamin =

Former Commissioner of the Virgin Islands Department of Education

Commissioner of the Virgin Islands Department of Education
- In office June 17, 2019 – June 27, 2022
- Governor: Albert Bryan
- Deputy: Maria Encarnacion; Victor Somme III
- Preceded by: Sharon McCollum
- Succeeded by: Victor Somme III (interim)

Deputy Superintendent of Schools from St. Thomas/St. John District
- In office 2013–2019
- Preceded by: Joe Sibilly
- Succeeded by: Syrma Dee Brown

Personal details
- Born: Racquel Berry; May 1, 1983 (age 43) St. Thomas, U.S. Virgin Islands
- Party: Democratic
- Spouse: Joseph Benjamin
- Children: 1
- Education: University of the Virgin Islands

Racquel Berry-Benjamin is a former Commissioner of the Virgin Islands Department of Education. She served in this role from 2019 until her resignation in 2022.

== Commissioner of Education ==
=== Appointment and tenure ===
Berry-Benjamin was nominated by Governor Albert Bryan Jr. in early 2019 to serve as Commissioner of the Virgin Islands Department of Education. She faced opposition during her confirmation process, as lawmakers expressed concerns about her readiness to lead the department, which manages a budget of nearly $200 million, including federal funds. After Berry-Benjamin made a second Senate appearance in March 2019 and Governor Bryan defended his nomination, her nomination was approved, and she assumed office as Education Commissioner.

Berry-Benjamin led the Department of Education during school recovery efforts from Hurricanes Irma and Maria and the transition to virtual learning due to the COVID-19 pandemic. She claimed successes for her tenure including distribution of thousands of Chromebooks and MiFi devices to students, ensuring access to online education, and the development of a five-year strategic plan for the department.

=== Resignation ===
Berry-Benjamin faced criticism from lawmakers and educators regarding school conditions, department responsiveness, and student engagement. In April 2022, protests erupted across the territory, with educators and students citing inadequate classroom conditions, mold issues, and air conditioning failures. On June 27, 2022, Governor Bryan announced her resignation, effective immediately. Assistant Commissioner Victor Somme was appointed as Acting Commissioner.
