= Michael Rice (educator) =

American educator

Michigan Superintendent of Public Instruction
- In office August 1, 2019 – October 3, 2025
- Preceded by: Sheila A. Alles
- Succeeded by: Sue C. Carnell

Personal details
- Born: c. 1963 (age 62–63)
- Education: Yale University; New York University
- Website: Official Website

Michael F. Rice (born c. 1963) is an American educator.

== Biography ==
Rice was born around 1963. He earned a bachelor's degree in psychology from Yale University, and went on to receive a master's and doctorate degree in administration from New York University.

Rice began his public education career at Washington, D.C. Public Schools, where he taught high school French. Rice went on to serve five years as superintendent of Clifton Public Schools in New Jersey, and then 12 years as that of Kalamazoo Public Schools in Michigan. Rice was named Michigan Superintendent of the Year in 2015. According to Ron French of Bridge Michigan, Rice "battled the Republican-led Michigan Legislature on several school policies". Such policies include public funds going toward private schools, student retention requirements based on reading levels, and the adoption of an A-through-F grading system.

In 2019, the position of Michigan Superintendent of Public Instruction had been filled by interim Superintendent Sheila Alles since the death of Superintendent Brian Whiston in 2018. The partisan makeup of the Michigan Board of Education was six Democrats and two Republicans. Rice was selected by the Board of Education on May 7, 2019, by a vote of 5–3, the other three votes going to Randy Liepa. Rice was supported by five of the six Democrats on the board. He began serving on August 1.

In September 2022, Republican gubernatorial candidate, and future nominee, Tudor Dixon called for Rice's resignation, ahead of the gubernatorial election. She did so due to training videos from a Department of Education training webinar, explaining teachers could talk with parents of students on subjects such as the student's suicidal thoughts without outing their sexuality.

Rice announced his retirement as state superintendent on April 4, 2025. He retired on October 3, immediately succeeded by interim superintendent Sue C. Carnell, with Glenn Maleyko selected to be his proper replacement.
