= Michigan Department of Education =

Aspect of government

Department of Education
- Michigan Department of Education Logo

Department overview
- Formed: 1850
- Headquarters: 608 West Allegan Street, Lansing
- Ministers responsible: Dr. Pamela Pugh, Board President; Ms. Ellen Lipton, Board Co-Vice President; Ms. Tiffany Tilley, Board Co-Vice President; Dr. Judith Pritchett, Board Secretary; Mr. Marshall Bullock, II, Board Treasurer; Dr. Mitchell Robinson, NASBE Delegate
- Department executives: Glenn Maleyko, Superintendent of Public Instruction; Sue C Carnell, Chief Deputy; Delsa Chapman, Deputy Superintendent, Assessment, School Improvement, and Systems Support; Michele A. Harmala, Deputy Superintendent, Educator Excellence, Career and Technical Education, Special Education, and Administrative Law; Diane Golzynski, Deputy Superintendent, Business, Health, and Library Services
- Child agencies: Library of Michigan; Michigan School for the Deaf
- Key document: CONSTITUTION OF MICHIGAN OF 1963 § 3 State board of education; duties.
- Website: michigan.gov/mde

The Michigan Department of Education (MDE) is a state government agency of Michigan in the United States. The MDE oversees public school districts in the state. The department is governed by the State Board of Education. The State Board of Education was first provided for in the Constitution of 1850 and currently exists through the provisions of Article VIII, Section 3, of the Constitution of 1963.

The state board is composed of eight members nominated by party conventions and elected at-large for terms of eight years, with two members being elected at each biennial state general election. The governor is authorized to fill vacancies on the state board and also serves as an ex officio member of the state board, without the right to vote. The superintendent of public instruction is appointed by the board for a term to be determined by the board, to serve as its chair, without the right to vote.

As the principal executive officer of the Department of Education, the superintendent sits on the Governor's Cabinet, the State Administrative Board, and acts as chair and a non-voting member of the State Board of Education. The superintendent advises the legislature on education policy and funding needs, as defined by the State Board of Education. The superintendent is responsible for the implementation of bills passed by the legislature and policies established by the State Board of Education. The superintendent is a spokesperson for education in the state. The superintendent also is the primary liaison to the United States Department of Education and other federal agencies. The department is led by Superintendent of Public Instruction Glenn Maleyko, who assumed the role on December 8, 2025.

Major departmental responsibilities include: educator preparation and certification; providing technical assistance to schools in the areas of education improvement and innovation, special education, grants, transportation, health and food programs; statewide student assessment; school accountability; career and technical education; early childhood learning; distribution of state school aid; and overseeing the distribution and use of federal education program funding. The department also operates the Library of Michigan and the Michigan School for the Deaf in Flint.

== Elected boards ==
=== State Board of Education ===
Members of the Michigan State Board of Education
Name	Start	Next Election	Party
Marshall Bullock, treasurer	December 22, 2022 (appointed)	2028	Democratic
Ellen Lipton, co-vice president	January 1, 2021	2028	Democratic
Tom McMillin	January 1, 2017	2032	Republican
Judith Pritchett, secretary	January 1, 2019	2026	Democratic
Pamela Pugh, president	January 1, 2015	2030	Democratic
Mitchell Robinson, NASBE delegate	January 1, 2023	2030	Democratic
Nikki Snyder	January 1, 2017	2032	Republican
Tiffany Tilley, co-vice president	January 1, 2019	2026	Democratic
Gretchen Whitmer, governor (ex officio)	January 1, 2019	2026	Democratic
Glenn Maleyko, superintendent (ex officio)	September 15, 2025	N/A	N/A

=== Michigan State University Board of Trustees ===
Members of the Michigan State University Board of Trustees
Name	Start	Next Election	Party
Rebecca Bahar-Cook	January 1, 2025	2032	Democratic
Mike Balow	January 1, 2025	2032	Republican
Kelly Tebay	January 1, 2019	2026	Democratic
Dennis Denno	January 1, 2023	2030	Democratic
Renee Knake Jefferson, vice chair	December 4, 2019 (appointed)	2030	Democratic
Sandy Pierce	December 27, 2022 (appointed)	2028	Democratic
Brianna Scott, chair	January 1, 2019	2026	Democratic
Rema Vassar	January 1, 2021	2028	Democratic
Kevin Guskiewicz, president (ex officio)	March 4, 2024		

=== University of Michigan Board of Regents ===
Name	Residence	Start	Next Election	Party
Jordan Acker	Huntington Woods	January 1, 2019	Primaried	Democratic
Michael Behm, vice chair	Grand Blanc	January 1, 2015	2030	Democratic
Mark Bernstein, chair	Ann Arbor	January 1, 2013	2028	Democratic
Paul Brown	Ann Arbor	January 1, 2019	2026	Democratic
Sarah Hubbard	Lansing	January 1, 2021	2028	Republican
Denise Ilitch	Bingham Farms	January 1, 2009	2032	Democratic
Carl Meyers	Dearborn	January 1, 2025	2032	Republican
Katherine White	Ann Arbor	January 1, 1999	2030	Democratic
Domenico Grasso, president (ex officio)		May 8, 2025		

=== Wayne State University Board of Governors ===
Members of the Wayne State University Board of Governors
Name	Start	Next Election	Party
Danielle Atkinson	January 1, 2023	2030	Democratic
Bryan Barnhill, chair	January 1, 2019	2026 (retiring)	Democratic
Michael Busuito	January 1, 2017	2032	Republican
Marilyn Kelly	January 1, 2015	2030	Democratic
Anil Kumar	January 1, 2019	2026 (retiring)	Democratic
Terri Lynn Land	January 1, 2021	2028	Republican
Sunny Reddy	January 1, 2025	2032	Republican
Shirley Stancato	December 12, 2019 (appointed)	2028	Democratic
Richard Bierschbach, president (ex officio)	September 17, 2025		

== List of superintendents of public instruction ==
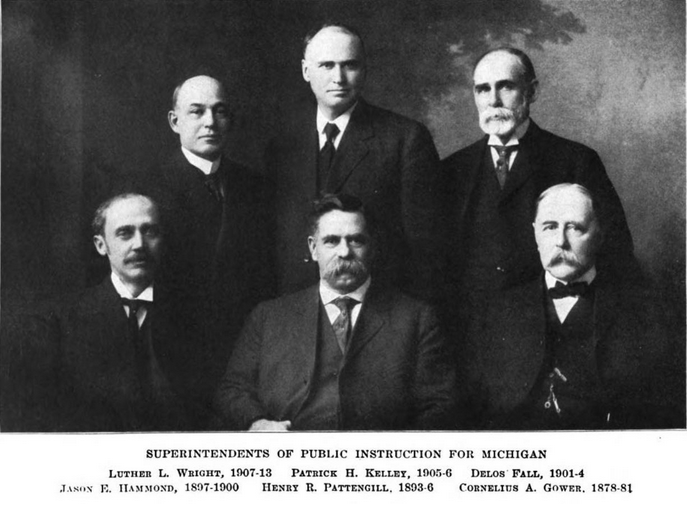
A group photo of men who have served as Michigan superintendent of public instruction in the late 19th and early 20th-century.

The following is a list of those who have served as Michigan Superintendent of Public Instruction.

Superintendent	Term	Notes
John Davis Pierce	1836–1841	
Franklin Sawyer Jr.	1841–1843	
Oliver C. Comstock	1843–1845	
Ira Mayhew	1845–1849	
Francis W. Shearman	1849–1854	
Ira Mayhew	1855–1858	
John Milton Gregory	1859–1864	
Oramel Hosford	1865–1872	
Daniel B. Briggs	1873–1876	
Horace S. Tarbell	1877–1878	Resigned.
Cornelius A. Gower	1878–1881	Resigned.
Varnum B. Cochran	1881–1883	Resigned.
Herschel R. Gass	1883–1885	Resigned.
Theodore Nelson	1885–1886	
Joseph Estabrook	1887–1890	
Ferris S. Fitch Jr.	1891–1892	
Henry R. Pattengill	1893–1896	
Jason E. Hammond	1897–1900	
Delos Fall	1901–1904	
Patrick H. Kelley	1905–1906	
Luther L. Wright	1907–1913	Resigned.
Fred L. Keeler	1913–1919	Died in office.
Thomas E. Johnson	1919–1926	Removed by governor.
Wilford L. Coffey	1926–1927	
Webster H. Pearce	1927–1933	
Paul F. Voelker	1933–1935	
Maurice R. Keyworth		Died before taking office.
Eugene B. Elliott	1935–1948	Resigned.
Lee M. Thurston	1948–1953	Resigned.
Clair L. Taylor	1953–1957	
Lynn M. Bartlett	1957–1965	
Alexander J. Kloster	1965–1966	Acting superintendent.
Ira Polley	1966–1969	
John W. Porter	1969–1979	Resigned.
Eugene T. Paslov	1979–1980	Interim superintendent.
Phillip E. Runkel	1980–1987	
Gary D. Hawks	1987–1988	Interim superintendent.
Donald L. Bemis	1988–1991	Resigned.
Gary D. Hawks	1991	Interim superintendent.
Robert E. Schiller	1991–1995	
Arthur E. Ellis	1995–2001	
Thomas D. Watkins Jr.	2001–2005	
Jeremy Hughes	2005	Interim superintendent.
Michael P. Flanagan	2005–2015	
Brian J. Whiston	2015–2018	Died in office.
Sheila A. Alles	2018–2019	Interim superintendent.
Michael F. Rice	2019–2025	
Sue C. Carnell	2025	Interim superintendent.
Glenn Maleyko	2025–present	

== See also ==
- List of members of the Michigan State Board of Education
