= National Association of State Boards of Education =

Nonprofit, private association

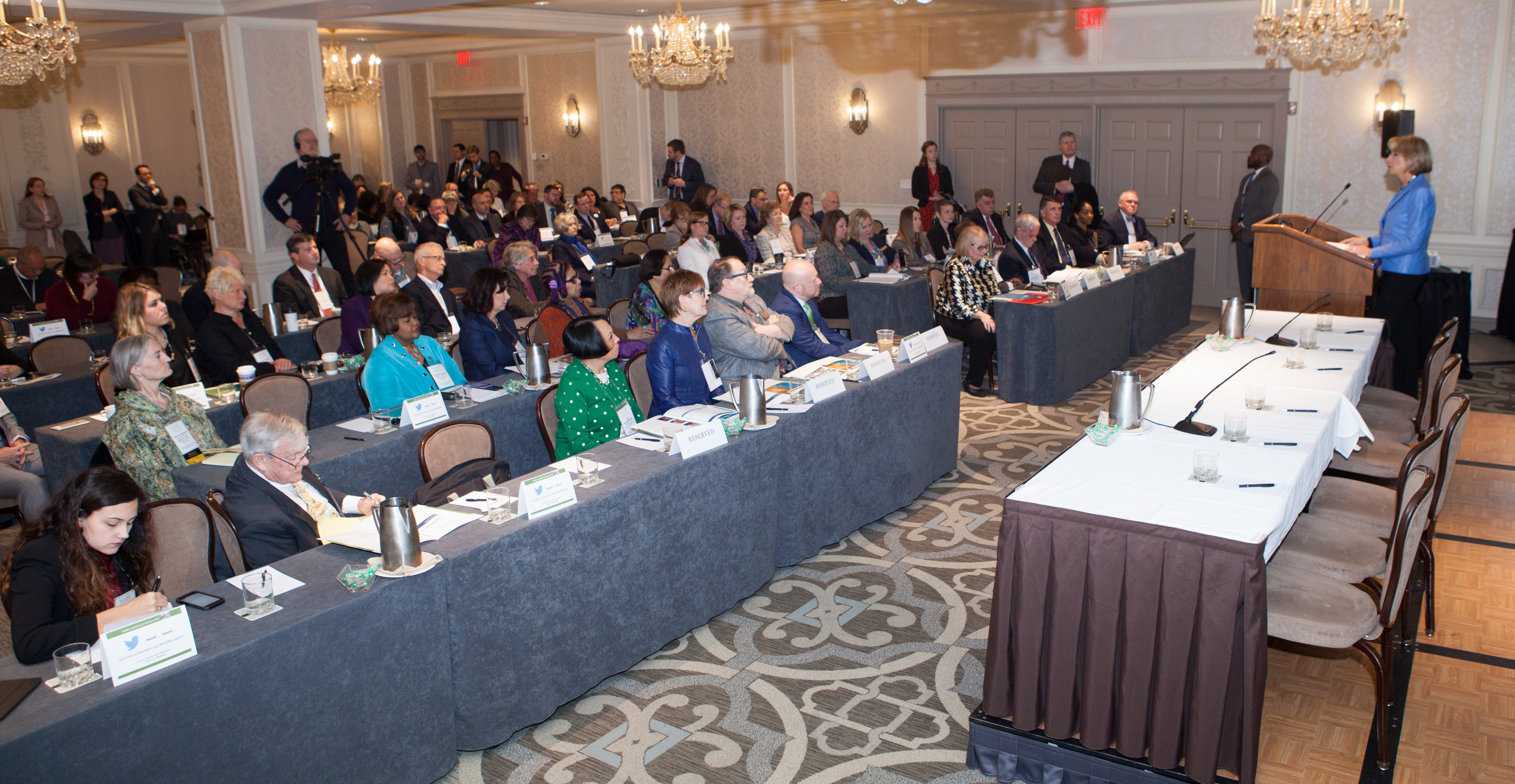
Education Secretary Betsy DeVos addresses NASBE's Legislative Conference in March 2017

The National Association of State Boards of Education (NASBE) is a nonprofit private association that represents U.S. state and territory boards of education. Founded in 1958, the association initially met in conjunction with the annual conference of the National School Boards Association, but by 1960, it was meeting on its own and had an office in Denver, Colorado. The association's principal objectives, stated in the bylaws, are to strengthen state leadership in education policy-making, promote excellence in the education of all students, advocate equality of access to educational opportunity, and assure responsible lay governance of public education. The NASBE now has its headquarters in Alexandria, Virginia.
