= List of Department of Housing and Urban Development appointments by Donald Trump =

Key
Appointees serving in offices that did not require Senate confirmation.
Appointees confirmed by the Senate who are currently serving or served through the entire term.
Appointees awaiting Senate confirmation.
Appointees serving in an acting capacity.
Appointees who have left office after confirmation or offices which have been disbanded.
Nominees who were withdrawn prior to being confirmed or assuming office.

== Appointments (first administration) ==
Office	Nominee	Assumed office	Left office
Secretary of Housing and Urban Development	Ben Carson	March 2, 2017 (Confirmed March 2, 2017, 58–41)	January 20, 2021
Secretary of Housing and Urban Development	Craig Clemmensen	January 20, 2017	March 2, 2017
Deputy Secretary of Housing and Urban Development	Brian D. Montgomery	May 12, 2020 (Confirmed May 12, 2020, 61–32)	January 20, 2021
Deputy Secretary of Housing and Urban Development	Brian D. Montgomery	January 17, 2019	May 10, 2020
Deputy Secretary of Housing and Urban Development	Pam Patenaude	September 27, 2017 (Confirmed September 14, 2017, 80–17)	January 17, 2019
Assistant Secretary of Housing and Urban Development (Housing); Federal Housing Commissioner	Dana T. Wade	July 29, 2020 (Confirmed July 28, 2020, 57–40)	March 2021
Assistant Secretary of Housing and Urban Development (Housing); Federal Housing Commissioner	Dana T. Wade	July 2017	June 2018
Assistant Secretary of Housing and Urban Development (Housing); Federal Housing Commissioner	Len Wolfson	May 12, 2020	July 29, 2020
Assistant Secretary of Housing and Urban Development (Housing); Federal Housing Commissioner	Brian D. Montgomery	June 5, 2018 (Confirmed May 23, 2018, 74–23)	May 12, 2020
General Counsel of Housing and Urban Development	J. Paul Compton Jr.	January 5, 2018 (Confirmed December 18, 2017, 62–34)	January 20, 2021
Chief Financial Officer of Housing and Urban Development	Irving Dennis	January 5, 2018 (Confirmed December 21, 2017, voice vote)	January 20, 2021
Inspector General of Housing and Urban Development	Rae Oliver Davis	January 23, 2019 (Confirmed January 2, 2019, voice vote)	January 24, 2025
Assistant Secretary of Housing and Urban Development (Congressional and Intergovernmental Relations)	Len Wolfson	January 5, 2018 (Confirmed December 21, 2017, voice vote)	October 2020
Assistant Secretary of Housing and Urban Development (Congressional and Intergovernmental Relations)	Seth Daniel Appleton	July 2017	December 2017
Assistant Secretary of Housing and Urban Development (Community Planning and Development)	John Gibbs	March 2020	January 20, 2021
Assistant Secretary of Housing and Urban Development (Community Planning and Development)	David Woll	Nomination withdrawn by the President on March 18, 2020	
Assistant Secretary of Housing and Urban Development (Community Planning and Development)	David Woll	November 2018	March 2020
Assistant Secretary of Housing and Urban Development (Community Planning and Development)	Neal Rackleff	October 18, 2017 (Confirmed August 3, 2017, voice vote)	November 2018
Assistant Secretary of Housing and Urban Development (Fair Housing and Equal Opportunity)	Anna Maria Farias	August 22, 2017 (Confirmed August 3, 2017, voice vote)	January 20, 2021
Assistant Secretary of Housing and Urban Development (Policy Development and Research)	Seth Daniel Appleton	June 2019 (Confirmed June 20, 2019, voice vote)	December 2020
Assistant Secretary of Housing and Urban Development (Public and Indian Housing)	Hunter Kurtz	June 2019 (Confirmed June 20, 2019, voice vote)	January 7, 2021
Assistant Secretary of Housing and Urban Development (Public and Indian Housing)	Hunter Kurtz	April 2019	June 2019
Assistant Secretary of Housing and Urban Development (Office of Administration)	John "Jack" Bobbitt	April 2020 (Confirmed April 21, 2020, voice vote)	January 20, 2021
Assistant Secretary of Housing and Urban Development (Office of Administration)	John "Jack" Bobbitt	February 2019	April 2020
Assistant Secretary of Housing and Urban Development (Office of Administration)	Suzanne Israel Tufts	January 5, 2018 (Confirmed December 21, 2017, voice vote)	October 19, 2018
Government National Mortgage Association
President of the Government National Mortgage Association	Michael Bright	Nomination lapsed and returned to the President on January 3, 2019	
President of the Government National Mortgage Association	Michael Bright	July 2017	January 16, 2019

== Appointments (second administration) ==
Office	Nominee	Assumed office	Left office
Secretary of Housing and Urban Development	Scott Turner	February 5, 2025 (Confirmed February 5, 2025, 55–44)	
Secretary of Housing and Urban Development	Matt Ammon	January 20, 2025	February 5, 2025
Deputy Secretary of Housing and Urban Development	Andrew Hughes	June 27, 2025 (Confirmed June 10, 2025, 51–43)	
General Counsel of Housing and Urban Development	David Woll	August 5, 2025 (Confirmed August 1, 2025, 51–43)	
Chief Financial Officer of Housing and Urban Development	Irving Dennis	Awaiting Senate Confirmation	
Chief Financial Officer of Housing and Urban Development	Irving Dennis	February 6, 2025	
Inspector General of Housing and Urban Development	Jeffrey Ledbetter	Awaiting Senate Confirmation	
Inspector General of Housing and Urban Development	Jeremy Ellis	Nomination withdrawn by the President on September 30, 2025	
Inspector General of Housing and Urban Development	Stephen M. Begg	January 24, 2025	August 14, 2025
Assistant Secretary of Housing and Urban Development (Congressional and Intergovernmental Relations)	Benjamin DeMarzo	December 1, 2025 (Confirmed* September 18, 2025, 51–44); *En bloc confirmation of 48 nominees.	
Assistant Secretary of Housing and Urban Development (Fair Housing and Equal Opportunity)	Craig Trainor	October 2025 (Confirmed* October 7, 2025, 51–47); *En bloc confirmation of 107 nominees.	
Assistant Secretary of Housing and Urban Development (Public and Indian Housing)	Benjamin Hobbs	January 14, 2026 (Confirmed* December 18, 2025, 53–43); *En bloc confirmation of 97 nominees.	
Assistant Secretary of Housing and Urban Development (Housing) & Federal Housing Commissioner	Matthew Jones	Awaiting Senate Confirmation	
Assistant Secretary of Housing and Urban Development (Housing) & Federal Housing Commissioner	Frank Cassidy	January 15, 2026 (Confirmed* December 18, 2025, 53–43); *En bloc confirmation of 97 nominees.	June 1, 2026
Assistant Secretary of Housing and Urban Development (Community Planning and Development)	Ronald Kurtz	December 19, 2025 (Confirmed* December 18, 2025, 53–43); *En bloc confirmation of 97 nominees.	
Government National Mortgage Association
President of the Government National Mortgage Association	Joseph Gormley	December 19, 2025 (Confirmed* December 18, 2025, 53–43); *En bloc confirmation of 97 nominees.	

== Notes ==
=== Confirmation votes ===
Confirmations by roll call vote (first administration)

Confirmations by voice vote (first administration)

Confirmations by roll call vote (second administration)

Confirmations by voice vote (second administration)
