= 2022 United States House of Representatives elections in Michigan =

- November 8, 2022

All 13 Michigan seats to the United States House of Representatives
	Majority party	Minority party
Party	Democratic	Republican
Last election	7	7
Seats won	7	6
Seat change	Steady	▼1
Popular vote	2,185,663	2,087,277
Percentage	49.83%	47.59%
Swing	▲0.25%	▼0.68%

Democratic hold Democratic gain
Republican hold Republican gain
Democratic
40–50%
50–60%
60–70%
70–80%
Republican
40–50%
50–60%
60–70%
70–80%

The 2022 United States House of Representatives elections in Michigan were held on November 8, 2022, to elect representatives for the thirteen seats in Michigan (reduced from 14 in the redistricting cycle following the 2020 United States census). The deadline for candidates to file for the August 2 primary was April 19. The congressional makeup prior to the election was seven Democrats and seven Republicans. However, after the 2020 census, Michigan lost one congressional seat. Democrats won a majority of seats in the state for the first time since 2008. (Note: While Democrats briefly held a plurality of seats after Republican Justin Amash left the party, they had not been elected to a majority of seats since 2008.) This can be partly attributed to the decrease in the number of districts, which resulted in two Republican incumbents – Bill Huizenga and Fred Upton – in the new 4th district. Redistricting also played a part in shifting partisan lean of the districts which favored the Democrats overall, including in the 3rd district, which Democrats were able to flip with a margin of victory of 13 points. That was made possible by a non-partisan citizens' commission drawing the new political boundaries instead of the Michigan legislature after a 2018 ballot proposal was approved.

== District 1 ==
2022 Michigan's 1st congressional district election
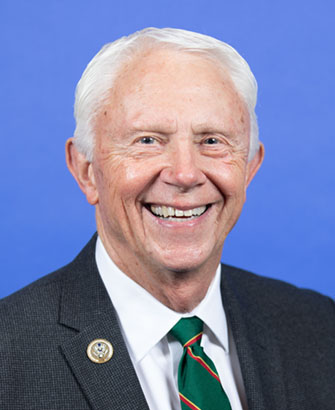

Nominee	Jack Bergman	Bob Lorinser
Party	Republican	Democratic
Popular vote	233,094	145,403
Percentage	60.0%	37.4%
- County results Bergman: 40–50% 50–60% 60–70% 70–80% Lorinser: 50–60%
U.S. Representative before election
Jack Bergman
Republican
Elected U.S. Representative
Jack Bergman
Republican

The 1st district covers the Upper Peninsula and the northern part of the Lower Peninsula, including Traverse City. The incumbent was Republican Jack Bergman, who was re-elected with 61.6% of the vote in 2020. The winner was Jack Bergman.

=== Republican primary ===
==== Candidates ====
===== Nominee =====
- Jack Bergman, incumbent U.S. representative

==== Results ====
Republican primary results
Party	Candidate	Votes	%
Republican	Jack Bergman (incumbent)	111,911	100.0
Write-in		6	0.0
Total votes		111,917	100.0

=== Democratic primary ===
==== Candidates ====
===== Nominee =====
- Bob Lorinser, physician

==== Results ====
Democratic primary results
Party	Candidate	Votes	%
Democratic	Bob Lorinser	67,251	100.0
Total votes		67,251	100.0

=== General election ===
==== Predictions ====
Source	Ranking	As of
The Cook Political Report	Solid R	December 28, 2021
Inside Elections	Solid R	January 13, 2022
Sabato's Crystal Ball	Safe R	January 4, 2022
Politico	Solid R	April 5, 2022
RCP	Safe R	June 9, 2022
Fox News	Solid R	July 11, 2022
DDHQ	Solid R	July 20, 2022
538	Solid R	June 30, 2022
The Economist	Safe R	September 28, 2022

==== Endorsements ====
Bob Lorinser (D)

Organizations

- Sierra Club

==== Results ====
2022 Michigan's 1st congressional district election
Party	Candidate	Votes	%
Republican	Jack Bergman (incumbent)	233,094	60.0
Democratic	Bob Lorinser	145,403	37.4
Working Class	Liz Hakola	5,510	1.4
Libertarian	Andrew Gale	4,592	1.2
Total votes		388,599	100.0
Republican hold			

== District 2 ==
2022 Michigan's 2nd congressional district election
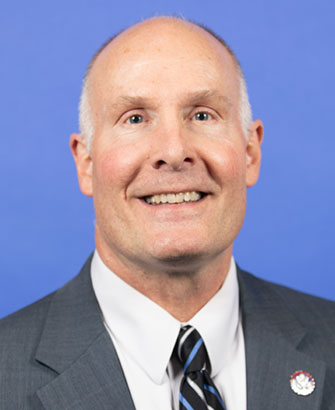

Nominee	John Moolenaar	Jerry Hilliard
Party	Republican	Democratic
Popular vote	216,222	116,452
Percentage	63.7%	34.3%
- County results Moolenaar: 50–60% 60–70% 70–80%
U.S. Representative before election
John Moolenaar
Republican
Elected U.S. Representative
John Moolenaar
Republican

The 2nd district runs along the eastern shoreline of Lake Michigan from Manistee to northern Muskegon County, includes parts of the Grand Rapids suburbs in Kent county, and parts of Central Michigan, including Mount Pleasant and western Midland County. Due to redistricting, the incumbent was Republican John Moolenaar of the 4th congressional district, who was re-elected with 65.0% of the vote in 2020. The winner was John Moolenaar.

=== Republican primary ===
==== Candidates ====
===== Nominee =====
- John Moolenaar, incumbent U.S. representative

===== Eliminated in primary =====
- Tom Norton, veteran

==== Endorsements ====
John Moolenaar

Newspapers

- Detroit News (primary only)

==== Results ====
Primary results by county: Moolenaar: 50–60%; 60–70%; 70–80%

Republican primary results
Party	Candidate	Votes	%
Republican	John Moolenaar (incumbent)	77,394	65.2
Republican	Tom Norton	41,273	34.8
Write-in		37	0.0
Total votes		118,704	100.0

=== Democratic primary ===
==== Candidates ====
===== Nominee =====
- Jerry Hilliard, nominee for Michigan's 4th congressional district in 2020

==== Results ====
Democratic primary results
Party	Candidate	Votes	%
Democratic	Jerry Hilliard	40,952	100.0
Total votes		40,952	100.0

=== General election ===
==== Predictions ====
Source	Ranking	As of
The Cook Political Report	Solid R	December 28, 2021
Inside Elections	Solid R	January 13, 2022
Sabato's Crystal Ball	Safe R	January 4, 2022
Politico	Solid R	April 5, 2022
RCP	Safe R	June 9, 2022
Fox News	Solid R	July 11, 2022
DDHQ	Solid R	July 20, 2022
538	Solid R	June 30, 2022
The Economist	Safe R	September 28, 2022

==== Results ====
2022 Michigan's 2nd congressional district election
Party	Candidate	Votes	%
Republican	John Moolenaar (incumbent)	216,222	63.7
Democratic	Jerry Hilliard	116,452	34.3
Libertarian	Nathan Hewer	6,847	2.0
Total votes		339,521	100.0
Republican hold			

== District 3 ==
2022 Michigan's 3rd congressional district election
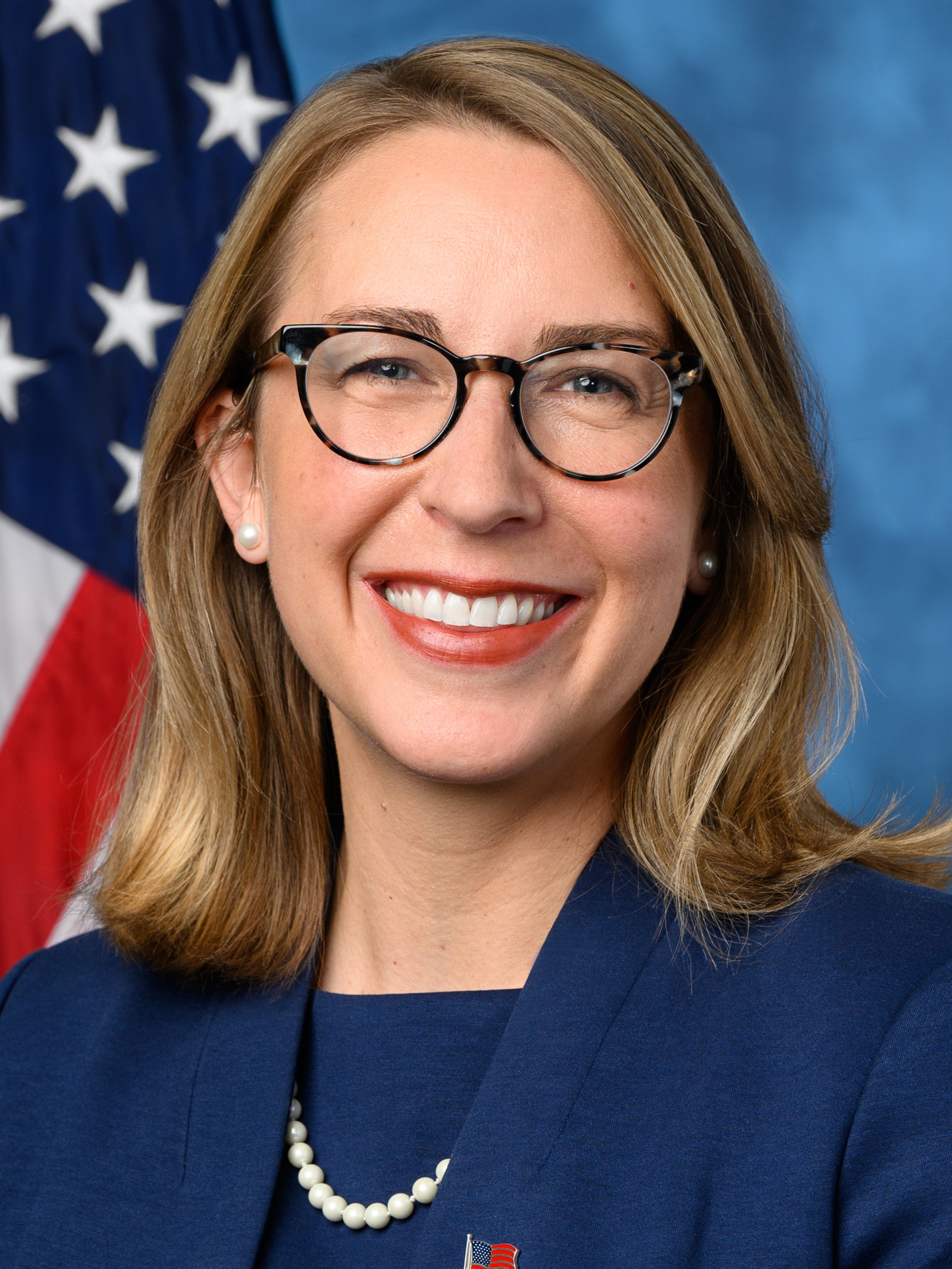

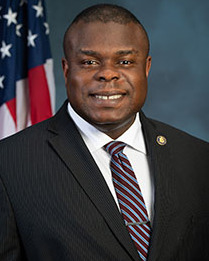
Nominee	Hillary Scholten	John Gibbs
Party	Democratic	Republican
Popular vote	185,989	142,229
Percentage	54.9%	42.0%
- Scholten: 40–50% 50–60% 60–70% 70–80% 80–90% >90% Gibbs: 40–50% 50–60% 60–70% 70–80% 80–90% >90% Tie: 40–50% No votes
U.S. Representative before election
Peter Meijer
Republican
Elected U.S. Representative
Hillary Scholten
Democratic

The 3rd district is based in western Michigan, and includes Grand Rapids, Muskegon, and parts of Ottawa County. The incumbent was Republican Peter Meijer, who was elected with 53.0% of the vote in 2020, but lost in the primary to pro-Trump candidate John Gibbs on August 2, 2022; as he was one of ten House Republicans who voted to impeach Donald Trump after the January 6 attack on the U.S. Capitol.

In the final days of the primary, the Democratic Congressional Campaign Committee bought $425,000 in TV ads that ostensibly attacked Gibbs (identifying him as "too conservative for West Michigan" and linking him to Trump) but were in fact designed to boost Gibbs' standing among pro-Trump Republican primary voters. The strategy—controversial within the Democratic Party—was based on the idea that Gibbs would be the weaker opponent in the general election, giving the Democrats an opportunity to win the 3rd district seat, which following the 2020 redistricting cycle had shifted from a Republican-leaning district to a swing district. Democrat Hillary Scholten flipped the district, winning by 12.93%. In flipping the district to the Democratic side, Scholten became the first Democratic member of Congress from the area since 1977.

=== Republican primary ===
==== Candidates ====
===== Nominee =====
- John Gibbs, former Assistant Secretary of Housing and Urban Development for Community Planning and Development and software engineer

===== Eliminated in primary =====
- Peter Meijer, incumbent U.S. representative

==== Endorsements ====
Peter Meijer

U.S. representatives

- Dan Crenshaw, U.S. representative from Texas's 2nd congressional district (2019–present)
- Kevin McCarthy, U.S. representative from California's 23rd congressional district (2005–2023)
- Steve Scalise, U.S. representative from Louisiana's 1st congressional district (2008–present)

Newspapers

- Detroit News (primary only)

Organizations

- Citizens for Responsible Energy Solutions
- New Politics
- Pro-Israel America
- Republican Jewish Coalition PAC
- United States Chamber of Commerce

==== Polling ====
Poll source	Date(s) administered	Sample size (Note: Key: A – all adults RV – registered voters LV – likely voters V – unclear)	Margin of error	John Gibbs	Audra Lemons-Johnson	Gabriella Manolache	Peter Meijer	Undecided
Impact Research (D) (Note: Poll conducted for EMILY's List)	January 11–13, 2022	400 (LV)	± 4.9%	13%	4%	2%	26%	55%

==== Results ====
Primary results by county: Gibbs 50–60%

Republican primary results
Party	Candidate	Votes	%
Republican	John Gibbs	54,136	51.8
Republican	Peter Meijer (incumbent)	50,440	48.2
Total votes		104,576	100.0

=== Democratic primary ===
==== Candidates ====
===== Nominee =====
- Hillary Scholten, attorney and nominee for Michigan's 3rd congressional district in 2020

==== Results ====
Democratic primary results
Party	Candidate	Votes	%
Democratic	Hillary Scholten	59,661	100.0
Total votes		59,661	100.0

=== General election ===
==== Predictions ====
Source	Ranking	As of
The Cook Political Report	Lean D (flip)	August 5, 2022
Inside Elections	Lean D (flip)	October 21, 2022
Sabato's Crystal Ball	Lean D (flip)	September 7, 2022
Politico	Lean D (flip)	August 12, 2022
RCP	Tossup	August 3, 2022
Fox News	Lean D (flip)	October 11, 2022
DDHQ	Tossup	November 1, 2022
538	Tossup	October 20, 2022
The Economist	Lean D (flip)	September 28, 2022

==== Endorsements ====
John Gibbs (R)

Executive branch officials

- Ben Carson, former Secretary of Housing and Urban Development (2017–2021)
- Donald Trump, 45th president of the United States (2017–2021)

U.S. senators

- Ted Cruz, U.S. senator from Texas (2013–present)

U.S. representatives

- Tulsi Gabbard, former U.S. representative from Hawaii's 2nd congressional district (2013–2021) (Independent)

Organizations

- Family Research Council Action PAC

Individuals

- Peter Thiel, entrepreneur and venture capitalist
Hillary Scholten (D)

State leadership

- Gretchen Whitmer, governor of Michigan

State legislators

- Winnie Brinks, state senator

Local officials

- George Heartwell, former mayor of Grand Rapids

Newspapers

- Detroit Free Press

Organizations

- EMILY's List
- End Citizens United (post primary)
- Giffords
- J Street
- League of Conservation Voters
- Let America Vote (post primary)
- NARAL Pro-Choice America
- New Democrat Coalition Action Fund
- Planned Parenthood Action Fund
- Sierra Club

Labor unions

- AFT Michigan
- IUOE Local 324
- Michigan Regional Council of Carpenters & Millwrights
Declined to endorse
- Peter Meijer, U.S. representative from Michigan's 3rd congressional district (2021–2023) (Republican)

==== Polling ====
Poll source	Date(s) administered	Sample size	Margin of error	John Gibbs (R)	Hillary Scholten (D)	Undecided
Public Policy Polling (D) (Note: This poll was sponsored by Scholten's campaign)	May 25–26, 2022	676 (V)	± 3.8%	35%	44%	21%

Hypothetical polling

Peter Meijer vs. Hillary Scholten

Poll source	Date(s) administered	Sample size	Margin of error	Peter Meijer (R)	Hillary Scholten (D)	Undecided
Public Policy Polling (D)	May 25–26, 2022	676 (V)	± 3.8%	37%	39%	24%

==== Results ====
2022 Michigan's 3rd congressional district election
Party	Candidate	Votes	%
Democratic	Hillary Scholten	185,989	54.9
Republican	John Gibbs	142,229	42.0
Libertarian	Jamie Lewis	6,634	2.0
Working Class	Louis Palus	4,136	1.2
Total votes		338,988	100.0
Democratic gain from Republican			

== District 4 ==
2022 Michigan's 4th congressional district election
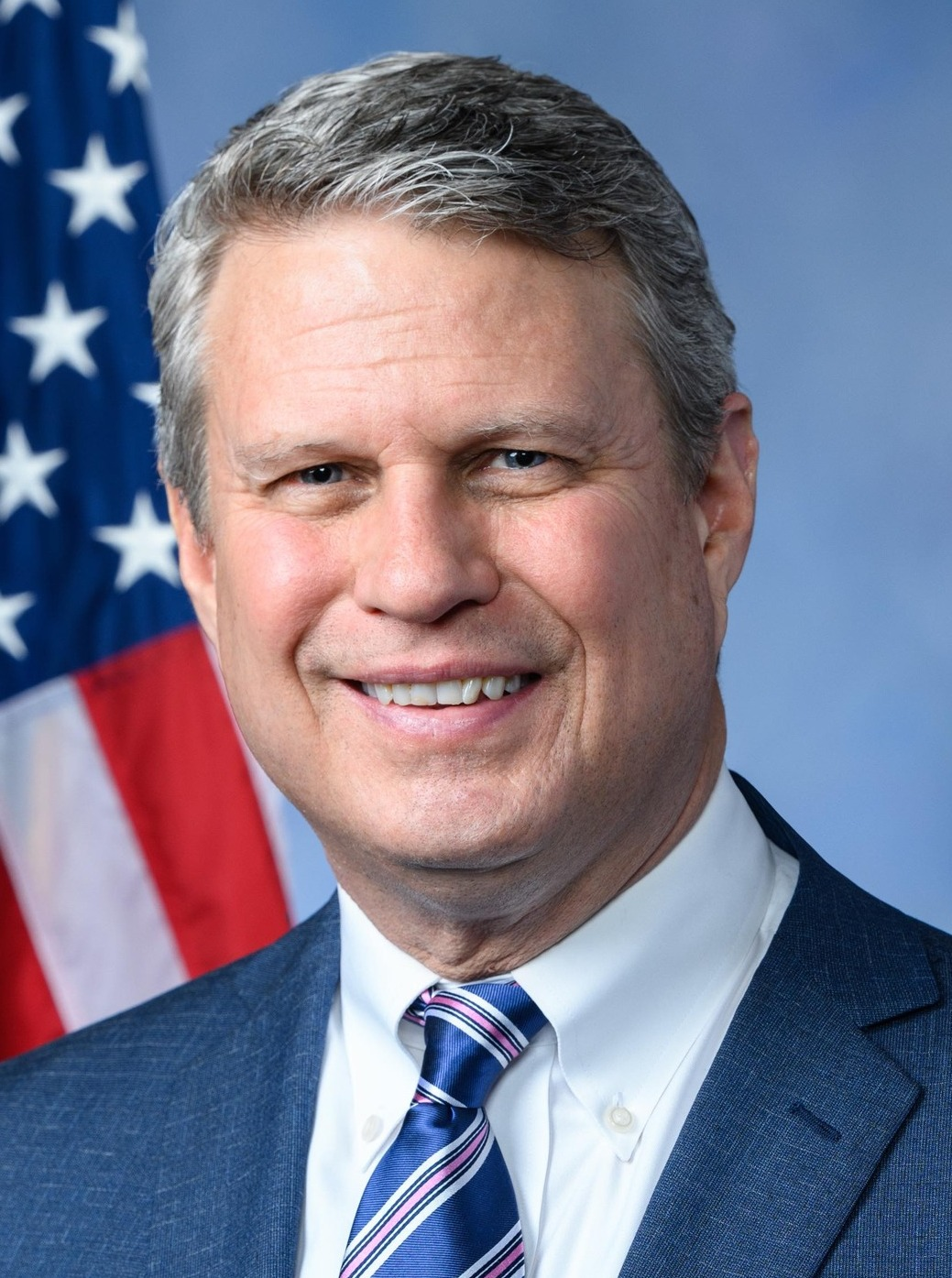

Nominee	Bill Huizenga	Joseph Alfonso
Party	Republican	Democratic
Popular vote	183,936	143,690
Percentage	54.4%	42.5%
- County results Huizenga: 40–50% 50–60% 60–70% Alfonso: 50–60%
U.S. Representatives before election
Bill Huizenga (Republican)
Fred Upton (Republican)
Elected U.S. Representative
Bill Huizenga
Republican

The 4th district is based in southwestern Michigan, and includes the cities of Kalamazoo and Holland. Due to redistricting, there were two incumbents in this district – Republican Bill Huizenga of the 2nd congressional district, who was re-elected with 59.2% of the vote in 2020, and Republican Fred Upton of the 6th congressional district, who was re-elected with 55.8% of the vote in 2020. Upton announced that he would be retiring at the end of his term. The winner was Bill Huizenga.

=== Republican primary ===
==== Candidates ====
===== Nominee =====
- Bill Huizenga, incumbent U.S. representative

===== Withdrawn =====
- Steve Carra, state representative (running for re-election, endorsed Huizenga)

===== Declined =====
- Fred Upton, incumbent U.S. representative

==== Endorsements ====
Steve Carra (withdrawn)

Executive branch officials

- Donald Trump, 45th president of the United States (2017–2021) (switched endorsement to Huizenga after Carra withdrew)
Bill Huizenga

Executive branch officials

- Donald Trump, 45th president of the United States (2017–2021)

State legislators

- Steve Carra, member of the Michigan House of Representatives from the 59th district (2021–present), withdrawn candidate for the seat

Organizations

- Pro-Israel America
Fred Upton (declined)

Organizations

- Pro-Israel America

==== Results ====
Republican primary results
Party	Candidate	Votes	%
Republican	Bill Huizenga (incumbent)	88,851	100.0
Total votes		88,851	100.0

=== Democratic primary ===
==== Candidates ====
===== Nominee =====
- Joseph Alfonso, member of the Michigan State Plumbing Board, non-profit treasurer, and U.S. Marine Corps veteran

===== Withdrawn =====
- Chris Glasser

==== Endorsements ====
Joseph Alfonso

Organizations

- Michigan Education Association
- One Fair Wage
- Vote Common Good

==== Results ====
Democratic primary results
Party	Candidate	Votes	%
Democratic	Joseph Alfonso (write-in)	10,992	100.0
Total votes		10,992	100.0

=== General election ===
==== Predictions ====
Source	Ranking	As of
The Cook Political Report	Solid R	June 15, 2022
Inside Elections	Solid R	June 15, 2022
Sabato's Crystal Ball	Safe R	June 15, 2022
Politico	Likely R	June 14, 2022
RCP	Safe R	June 9, 2022
Fox News	Solid R	July 11, 2022
DDHQ	Solid R	July 20, 2022
538	Solid R	June 30, 2022
The Economist	Safe R	September 28, 2022

==== Results ====
2022 Michigan's 4th congressional district election
Party	Candidate	Votes	%
Republican	Bill Huizenga (incumbent)	183,936	54.4
Democratic	Joseph Alfonso	143,690	42.5
Libertarian	Lorence Wenke	8,478	2.5
U.S. Taxpayers'	Curtis Michael Clark	2,244	0.7
Total votes		338,348	100.0
Republican hold			

== District 5 ==
2022 Michigan's 5th congressional district election
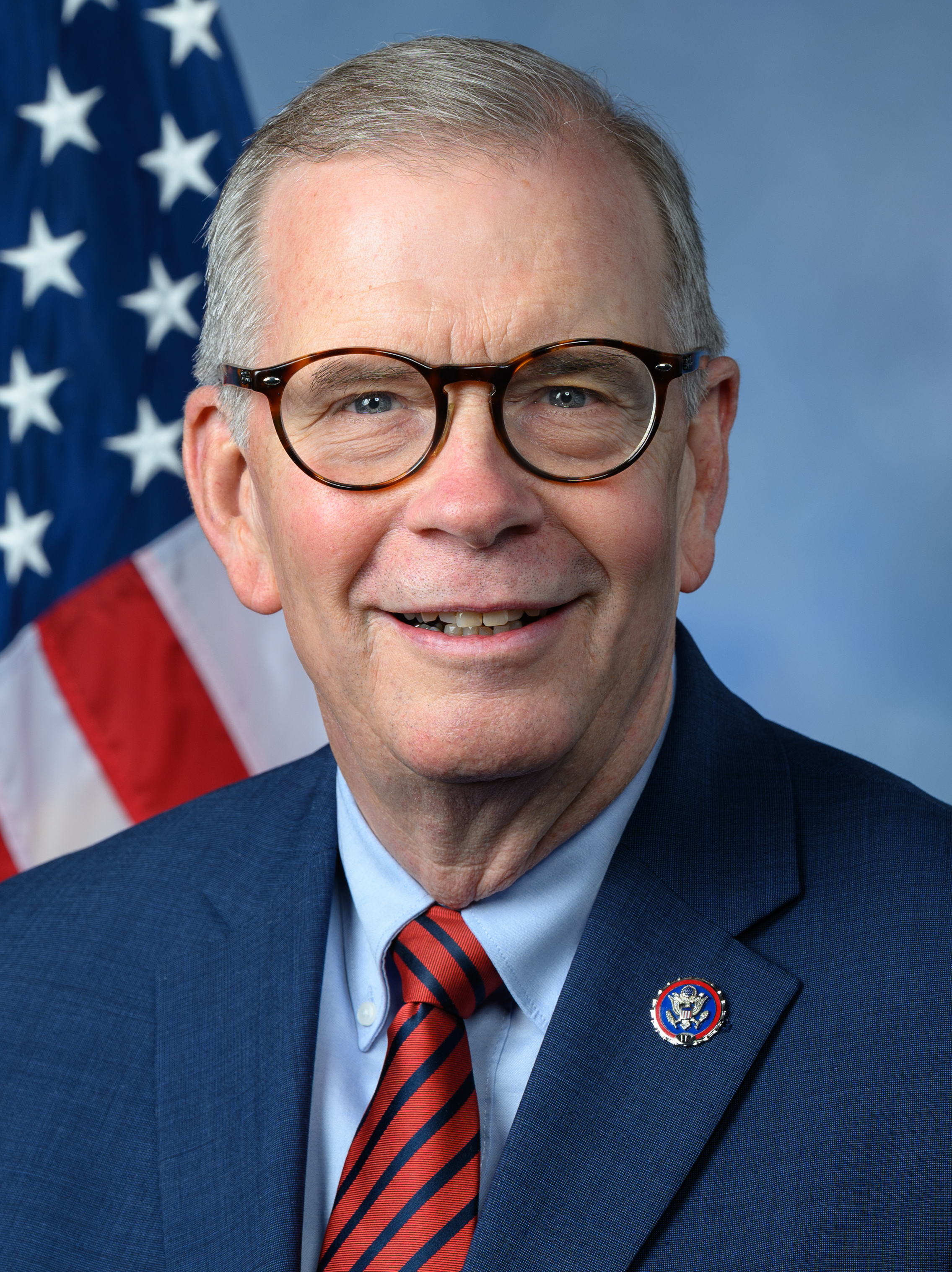

Nominee	Tim Walberg	Bart Goldberg
Party	Republican	Democratic
Popular vote	198,020	110,946
Percentage	62.4%	35.0%
- County results Walberg: 50–60% 60–70% 70–80%
U.S. Representative before election
Tim Walberg
Republican
Elected U.S. Representative
Tim Walberg
Republican

The 5th district runs along Michigan's entire southern border with Indiana and Ohio and includes the cities of Three Rivers, Jackson, and Monroe. Due to redistricting, the incumbent was Republican Tim Walberg of the 7th congressional district, who was re-elected with 58.8% of the vote in 2020. The winner was Tim Walberg.

=== Republican primary ===
==== Candidates ====
===== Nominee =====
- Tim Walberg, incumbent U.S. representative

===== Eliminated in primary =====
- Sherry O'Donnell, osteopathic physician

==== Endorsements ====
Tim Walberg

Federal officials

- Donald Trump, former president of the United States

==== Results ====
Primary results by county: Walberg: 50–60%; 60–70%; 70–80%; O'Donnell: 50–60%

Republican primary results
Party	Candidate	Votes	%
Republican	Tim Walberg (incumbent)	67,582	67.2
Republican	Sherry O'Donnell	32,886	32.7
Write-in		97	0.1
Total votes		100,565	100.0

=== Democratic primary ===
==== Candidates ====
===== Nominee =====
- Bart Goldberg, attorney

==== Results ====
Democratic primary results
Party	Candidate	Votes	%
Democratic	Bart Goldberg	39,971	100.0
Total votes		39,971	100.0

=== General election ===
==== Endorsements ====
Tim Walberg

Newspapers

- The Detroit News

==== Predictions ====
Source	Ranking	As of
The Cook Political Report	Solid R	December 28, 2021
Inside Elections	Solid R	January 13, 2022
Sabato's Crystal Ball	Safe R	January 4, 2022
Politico	Solid R	April 5, 2022
RCP	Safe R	June 9, 2022
Fox News	Solid R	July 11, 2022
DDHQ	Solid R	July 20, 2022
538	Solid R	June 30, 2022
The Economist	Safe R	September 28, 2022

==== Results ====
2022 Michigan's 5th congressional district election
Party	Candidate	Votes	%
Republican	Tim Walberg (incumbent)	198,020	62.4
Democratic	Bart Goldberg	110,946	35.0
Libertarian	Norman Peterson	5,129	1.6
U.S. Taxpayers'	Ezra Scott	3,162	1.0
Write-in		1	0.0
Total votes		317,258	100.0
Republican hold			

== District 6 ==
2022 Michigan's 6th congressional district election
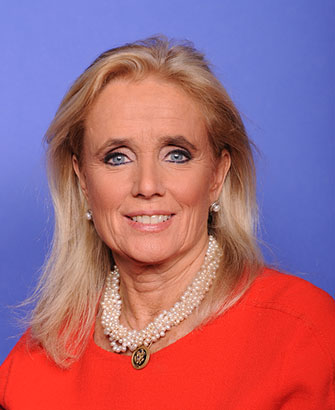

Nominee	Debbie Dingell	Whittney Williams
Party	Democratic	Republican
Popular vote	241,759	125,167
Percentage	65.9%	34.1%
- County results Dingell: 50–60% 70–80%
U.S. Representative before election
Debbie Dingell
Democratic
Elected U.S. Representative
Debbie Dingell
Democratic

The 6th district is based in southeastern Michigan, taking in Washtenaw County, parts of Wayne and Oakland counties, including the cities of Ann Arbor, Canton, Novi, and Ypsilanti. Due to redistricting, the incumbent was Democrat Debbie Dingell of the 12th congressional district, who was re-elected with 66.4% of the vote in 2020. The winner was Debbie Dingell.

=== Democratic primary ===
==== Candidates ====
===== Nominee =====
- Debbie Dingell, incumbent U.S. representative

==== Endorsements ====
Debbie Dingell

Organizations

- Feminist Majority PAC
- League of Conservation Voters
- Natural Resources Defense Council
- Planned Parenthood Action Fund
- Progressive Democrats of America
- Sierra Club

Newspapers

- Detroit Free Press (post-primary)

==== Results ====
Democratic primary results
Party	Candidate	Votes	%
Democratic	Debbie Dingell (incumbent)	102,859	100.0
Total votes		102,859	100.0

=== Republican primary ===
==== Candidates ====
===== Nominee =====
- Whittney Williams, auto show product specialist and candidate for Michigan's 11th congressional district in 2020

===== Eliminated in primary =====
- Hima Kolanagireddy, businesswoman

==== Results ====
Republican primary results
Party	Candidate	Votes	%
Republican	Whittney Williams	30,564	53.7
Republican	Hima Kolanagireddy	26,371	46.3
Total votes		56,935	100.0

=== General election ===
==== Predictions ====
Source	Ranking	As of
The Cook Political Report	Solid D	December 28, 2021
Inside Elections	Solid D	January 13, 2022
Sabato's Crystal Ball	Safe D	January 4, 2022
Politico	Solid D	April 5, 2022
RCP	Safe D	June 9, 2022
Fox News	Solid D	July 11, 2022
DDHQ	Solid D	July 20, 2022
538	Solid D	June 30, 2022
The Economist	Safe D	September 28, 2022

==== Results ====
2022 Michigan's 6th congressional district election
Party	Candidate	Votes	%
Democratic	Debbie Dingell (incumbent)	241,759	65.9
Republican	Whittney Williams	125,167	34.1
Write-in		1	0.0
Total votes		366,927	100.0
Democratic hold			

== District 7 ==
2022 Michigan's 7th congressional district election
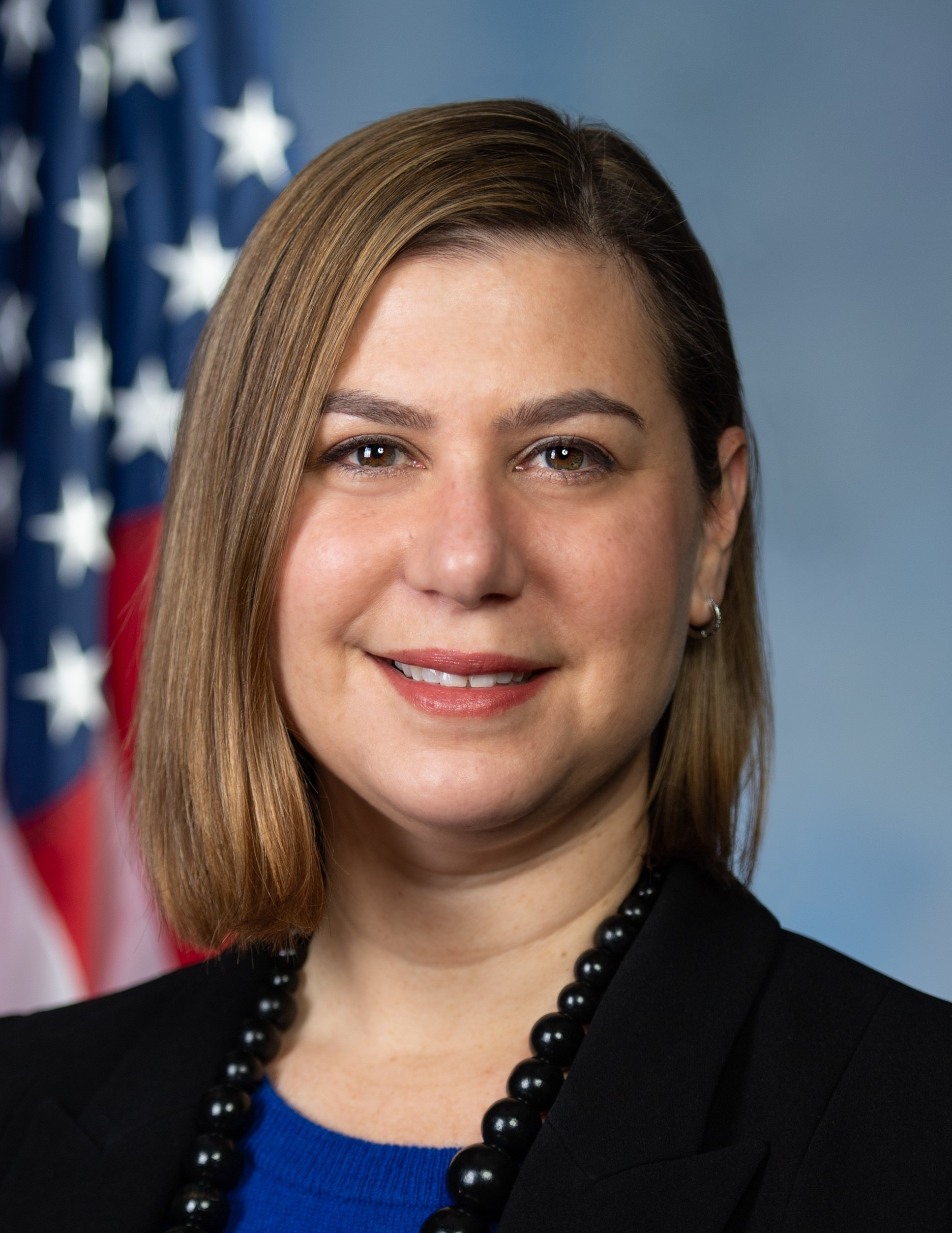

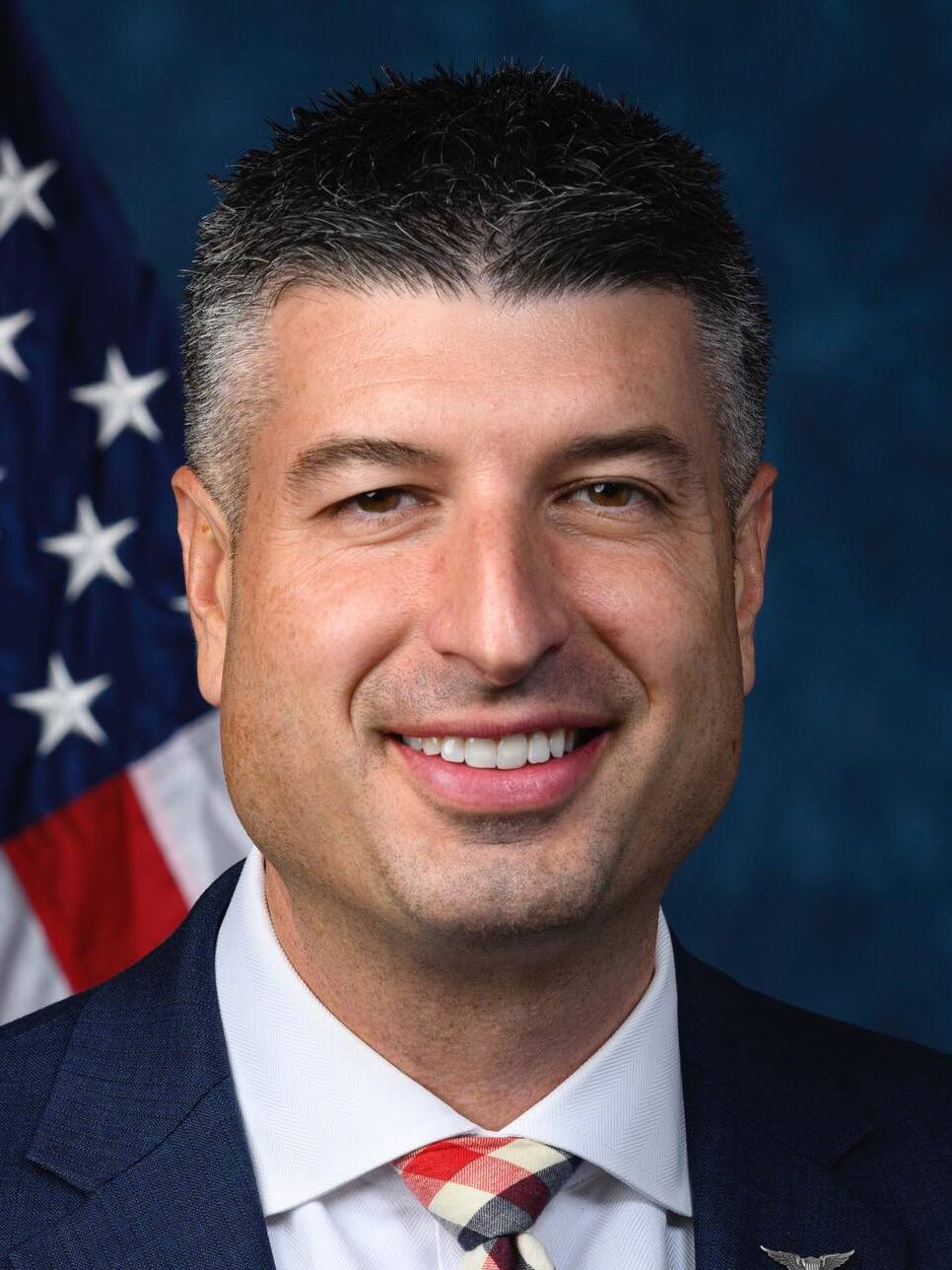
Nominee	Elissa Slotkin	Tom Barrett
Party	Democratic	Republican
Popular vote	192,809	172,624
Percentage	51.7%	46.3%
- Slotkin: 50–60% 60–70% Barrett: 50–60% 60–70%
U.S. Representative before election
Elissa Slotkin
Democratic
Elected U.S. Representative
Elissa Slotkin
Democratic

The 7th district is based around the Lansing–East Lansing metropolitan area, but also includes Livingston County and a small part of Oakland County. Due to redistricting, the incumbent was Democrat Elissa Slotkin of the 8th congressional district, who was re-elected with 50.9% of the vote in 2020.

In 2018, total campaign spending for the seat won by Slotkin drew the highest amount for a U.S. House seat in Michigan's history. In October 2022, the Slotkin–Barrett race was the most expensive House race nationwide. The winner was Elissa Slotkin.

=== Democratic primary ===
==== Candidates ====
===== Nominee =====
- Elissa Slotkin, incumbent U.S. representative

==== Endorsements ====
Elissa Slotkin

Organizations

- AIPAC
- End Citizens United
- Feminist Majority PAC
- Giffords
- Humane Society of the United States Legislative Fund
- League of Conservation Voters
- Let America Vote
- NARAL Pro-Choice America
- New Politics
- Planned Parenthood Action Fund
- Sierra Club
- VoteVets.org

==== Results ====
Democratic primary results
Party	Candidate	Votes	%
Democratic	Elissa Slotkin (incumbent)	77,826	100.0
Total votes		77,826	100.0

=== Republican primary ===
==== Candidates ====
===== Nominee =====
- Tom Barrett, state senator from the 24th district

===== Declined =====
- John James, businessman, former U.S. Army captain and Republican nominee for the U.S. Senate in 2018 and 2020 (running in Michigan's 10th congressional district)
- Paul Junge, former news anchor for FOX 47 News, former external affairs director at ICE, and nominee for Michigan's 8th congressional district in 2020 (running in Michigan's 8th congressional district)

==== Endorsements ====
Tom Barrett

Organizations

- American Conservative Union
- Americans for Prosperity Action
- Tea Party Express

==== Results ====
Republican primary results
Party	Candidate	Votes	%
Republican	Tom Barrett	75,491	96.1
Republican	Jake Hagg (write-in)	3,108	3.9
Total votes		78,599	100.0

=== General election ===
==== Predictions ====
Source	Ranking	As of
The Cook Political Report	Tossup	June 15, 2022
Inside Elections	Tilt D	June 15, 2022
Sabato's Crystal Ball	Lean R (flip)	November 7, 2022
Politico	Tossup	June 14, 2022
RCP	Tossup	June 9, 2022
Fox News	Tossup	July 11, 2022
Decision Desk HQ	Tossup	November 4, 2022
538	Lean D	October 20, 2022
The Economist	Lean D	November 8, 2022

==== Post-primary endorsements ====
Elissa Slotkin (D)

U.S. representatives

- Liz Cheney, U.S. representative for WY-AL (2017–2023) (Republican)
Tom Barrett (R)

Executive branch officials

- Mike Pence, vice president of the United States (2017–2021)

U.S. representatives

- Tulsi Gabbard, U.S. representative for HI-2 (2013–2021) and former vice chair of the Democratic National Committee (2013–2016) (Independent)
- Kevin McCarthy, U.S. representative for CA-23 (2013–2023), House Minority Leader (2019–present), and former U.S. representative for CA-22 (2007–2013)
- Steve Scalise, U.S. representative for LA-1 (2008–present), House Minority Whip (2019–present)
- Jason Smith, U.S. representative for MO-8 (2013–present)
- Elise Stefanik, U.S. representative for NY-21 (2015–present)

State legislators

- Bob Bezotte, Michigan state representative, 47th district (2021–present)
- Alan Cropsey, Michigan state senator, 30th (1983–1986), 33rd district (2003–2010), Michigan state representative, 88th (1979–1982), 86th district (1993–1998)
- Graham Filler, Michigan state representative, 93rd district (2019–present)
- Ben Frederick, Michigan state representative, 85th district (2017–present), Michigan House of Representatives Majority Leader (2019–present)
- Rick Jones, Michigan state senator, 24th district (2011–2019)
- Tom Leonard, Michigan state representative, 93rd district (2013–2019), Speaker of the Michigan House of Representatives (2017–2019)
- Paul Opsommer, Michigan state representative, 93rd district (2007–2012)
- Deb Shaughnessy, Michigan state representative, 71st district (2011–2012)
- Norm Shinkle, Michigan state senator, 11th district (1983–1990)
- Lana Theis, Michigan state senator, 22nd district (2019–present)

Individuals

- Harriet Hageman, attorney and Republican nominee for WY-AL in 2022

Organizations

- Michigan Farm Bureau's AgriPac
- National Federation of Independent Business

==== Polling ====
Aggregate polls

Source of poll aggregation	Dates administered	Dates updated	Elissa Slotkin (D)	Tom Barrett (R)	Undecided (Note: Calculated by taking the difference of 100% and all other candidates combined.)	Margin
FiveThirtyEight	April 10 – November 2, 2022	November 3, 2022	47.7%	44.3%	8.0%	Slotkin +3.4

Graphical summary

Poll source	Date(s) administered	Sample size	Margin of error	Elissa Slotkin (D)	Tom Barrett (R)	Other	Undecided
Mitchell Research	November 2, 2022	402 (LV)	± 4.9%	48%	48%	–	4%
The Glengariff Group, Inc.	October 18–20, 2022	400 (LV)	± 4.9%	47%	41%	4% (Note: Dailey with 4%)	8%
Target Insyght	September 12–14, 2022	500 (LV)	± 4.5%	56%	38%	–	6%
Cygnal (R) (Note: Poll sponsored jointly by the National Republican Congressional Committee and Barrett's campaign committee)	June 14–16, 2022	400 (LV)	± 4.7%	44%	46%	–	10%
Slingshot Strategies (D)	April 10–15, 2022	600 (RV)	± 4.0%	40%	34%	4%	19%

Hypothetical polling

Generic Democrat vs. generic Republican

Poll source	Date(s) administered	Sample size	Margin of error	Generic Democrat	Generic Republican	Other	Undecided
Cygnal (R)	June 14–16, 2022	400 (LV)	± 4.7%	39%	50%	–	10%
Slingshot Strategies (D)	April 10–15, 2022	600 (RV)	± 4.0%	39%	39%	4%	16%
Cygnal (R) (Note: Poll conducted for the Congressional Leadership Fund)	November 17–18, 2021	414 (LV)	± 4.8%	41%	51%	–	8%

==== Results ====
2022 Michigan's 7th congressional district election
Party	Candidate	Votes	%
Democratic	Elissa Slotkin (incumbent)	192,809	51.7
Republican	Tom Barrett	172,624	46.3
Libertarian	Leah Dailey	7,275	2.0
Total votes		372,708	100.0
Democratic hold			

== District 8 ==
2022 Michigan's 8th congressional district election
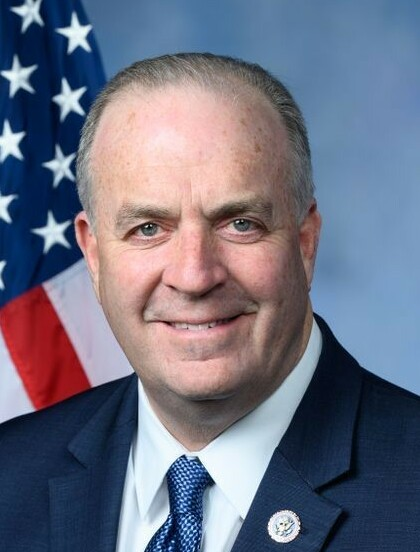

Nominee	Dan Kildee	Paul Junge
Party	Democratic	Republican
Popular vote	178,322	143,850
Percentage	53.1%	42.8%
- Kildee: 40–50% 50–60% 60–70% 70–80% 80–90% >90% Junge: 40–50% 50–60% 60–70% 70–80% Tie: 40–50%
U.S. Representative before election
Dan Kildee
Democratic
Elected U.S. Representative
Dan Kildee
Democratic

The 8th district centers around the Saginaw Bay and includes the cities of Flint, Saginaw, Bay City, and Midland. Due to redistricting, the incumbent was Democrat Dan Kildee of the 5th congressional district, who was re-elected with 54.5% of the vote in 2020. The winner was Dan Kildee.

=== Democratic primary ===
==== Candidates ====
===== Nominee =====
- Dan Kildee, incumbent U.S. representative

==== Endorsements ====
Dan Kildee

Individuals

- Mark Ruffalo, actor and producer

Organizations

- Feminist Majority PAC
- Giffords
- League of Conservation Voters
- NARAL Pro-Choice America
- Natural Resources Defense Council
- Planned Parenthood Action Fund
- Sierra Club

==== Results ====
Democratic primary results
Party	Candidate	Votes	%
Democratic	Dan Kildee (incumbent)	70,791	100.0
Total votes		70,791	100.0

=== Republican primary ===
==== Candidates ====
===== Nominee =====
- Paul Junge, former news anchor for FOX 47 News, former external affairs director at ICE, and nominee for Michigan's 8th congressional district in 2020

===== Eliminated in primary =====
- Candice Miller, retired businesswoman
- Matthew Seely, businessman

===== Failed to qualify =====
- Bryan Trouten

===== Declined =====
- Bill Schuette, former Michigan attorney general (2011–2019) and Republican nominee for Michigan governor in 2018

==== Endorsements ====
Paul Junge

Organizations

- Tea Party Express

==== Results ====
Primary results by county: Junge: 40–50%; 50–60%; 60–70%

Republican primary results
Party	Candidate	Votes	%
Republican	Paul Junge	42,363	53.7
Republican	Matthew Seely	18,658	23.6
Republican	Candice Miller	17,879	22.7
Total votes		78,900	100.0

=== Independent and third-party candidates ===
==== Libertarian Party ====
===== Presumptive nominee =====
- David Canny

=== General election ===
==== Endorsements ====
Paul Junge

Newspapers

- The Detroit News

==== Predictions ====
Source	Ranking	As of
The Cook Political Report	Lean D	October 5, 2022
Inside Elections	Lean D	October 21, 2022
Sabato's Crystal Ball	Lean D	November 7, 2022
Politico	Lean D	October 3, 2022
RCP	Tossup	November 6, 2022
Fox News	Tossup	July 11, 2022
DDHQ	Tossup	July 20, 2022
538	Likely D	June 30, 2022
The Economist	Lean D	October 4, 2022

==== Polling ====
Poll source	Date(s) administered	Sample size	Margin of error	Dan Kildee (D)	Paul Junge (R)	Other	Undecided
Cygnal (R) (Note: This poll was sponsored by Junge's campaign)	September 27–30, 2022	335 (LV)	± 5.3%	44%	45%	6%	5%
RMG Research	July 28 – August 4, 2022	400 (LV)	± 4.9%	43%	40%	7%	9%

==== Results ====
2022 Michigan's 8th congressional district election
Party	Candidate	Votes	%
Democratic	Dan Kildee (incumbent)	178,322	53.1
Republican	Paul Junge	143,850	42.8
Working Class	Kathy Goodwin	9,077	2.7
Libertarian	David Canny	4,580	1.4
Total votes		335,829	100.0
Democratic hold			

== District 9 ==
2022 Michigan's 9th congressional district election
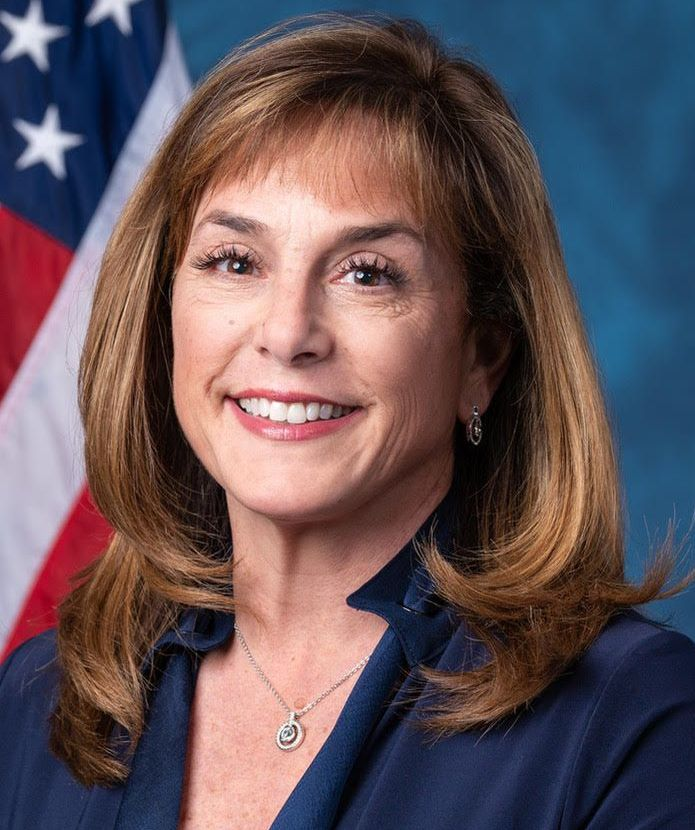

Nominee	Lisa McClain	Brian Jaye
Party	Republican	Democratic
Popular vote	238,300	123,702
Percentage	63.9%	33.2%
- County results McClain: 50–60% 60–70% 70–80%
U.S. Representative before election
Lisa McClain
Republican
Elected U.S. Representative
Lisa McClain
Republican

The 9th district is based in The Thumb region, including Port Huron as well as the northern Detroit exurbs in Oakland and Macomb counties. Due to redistricting, the incumbent was Republican Lisa McClain formerly of the 10th congressional district, who was elected with 66.3% of the vote in 2020. The winner was Lisa McClain.

=== Republican primary ===
==== Candidates ====
===== Nominee =====
- Lisa McClain, incumbent U.S. representative

===== Eliminated in primary =====
- Michelle Donovan, attorney

==== Endorsements ====
Lisa McClain

Executive branch officials

- Donald Trump, 45th president of the United States (2017–2021)

Organizations

- Maggie's List

==== Results ====
Republican primary results
Party	Candidate	Votes	%
Republican	Lisa McClain (incumbent)	97,017	78.7
Republican	Michelle Donovan	26,215	21.3
Total votes		123,232	100.0

=== Democratic primary ===
==== Candidates ====
===== Nominee =====
- Brian Jaye, attorney

==== Results ====
Democratic primary results
Party	Candidate	Votes	%
Democratic	Brian Jaye	48,802	100.0
Total votes		48,802	100.0

=== General election ===
==== Predictions ====
Source	Ranking	As of
The Cook Political Report	Solid R	December 28, 2021
Inside Elections	Solid R	January 13, 2022
Sabato's Crystal Ball	Safe R	January 4, 2022
Politico	Solid R	April 5, 2022
RCP	Safe R	June 9, 2022
Fox News	Solid R	July 11, 2022
DDHQ	Solid R	July 20, 2022
538	Solid R	June 30, 2022
The Economist	Safe R	September 28, 2022

==== Results ====
2022 Michigan's 9th congressional district election
Party	Candidate	Votes	%
Republican	Lisa McClain (incumbent)	238,300	63.9
Democratic	Brian Jaye	123,702	33.2
Working Class	Jim Walkowicz	6,571	1.8
Libertarian	Jacob Kelts	4,349	1.2
Total votes		372,922	100.0
Republican hold			

== District 10 ==
2022 Michigan's 10th congressional district election
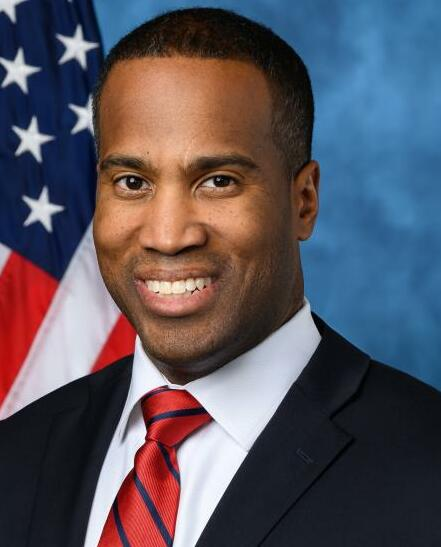

Nominee	John James	Carl Marlinga
Party	Republican	Democratic
Popular vote	159,202	157,602
Percentage	48.8%	48.3%
- James: 40–50% 50–60%
U.S. Representative before election
None
(new seat)
Elected U.S. Representative
John James
Republican

The 10th district is based primarily in southeastern Michigan's Macomb County, taking in Warren and Sterling Heights, as well as a small portion of eastern Oakland County. Due to redistricting after the 2020 census, this was an open district with no incumbent. The winner was John James.

=== Democratic primary ===
==== Candidates ====
===== Nominee =====
- Carl Marlinga, former Macomb County Circuit Court judge, candidate for U.S. Senate in 1994, and nominee for this seat in 2002

===== Eliminated in primary =====
- Huwaida Arraf, civil rights attorney
- Rhonda Powell, former director of Macomb County Health and Community Services
- Angela Rogensues, Warren City Council member
- Henry Yanez, Sterling Heights council member and former state representative

===== Declined =====
- Andy Levin, U.S. representative (running in Michigan's 11th congressional district)
- Michael Taylor, mayor of Sterling Heights

==== Endorsements ====
Huwaida Arraf

Organizations

- Jewish Voice for Peace Action Fund

Individuals

- Chelsea Handler, actress
Carl Marlinga

Organizations

- League of Conservation Voters

Newspapers

- Detroit Free Press (primary only)
Angela Rogensues

Organizations

- Democracy for America

==== Polling ====
Poll source	Date(s) administered	Sample size	Margin of error	Huwaida Arraf	Carl Marlinga	Rhonda Powell	Angela Rogensues	Michael Taylor	Henry Yanez	Undecided
Target Insyght (D) (Note: This poll was sponsored by Marlinga's campaign)	May 24–27, 2022	300 (LV)	± 5.7%	8%	40%	13%	16%	–	7%	15%
Target Insyght	January 25–27, 2022	~225 (LV)	± 6.5%	3%	33%	–	2%	16%	–	47%

==== Results ====
Democratic primary results
Party	Candidate	Votes	%
Democratic	Carl Marlinga	32,653	47.8
Democratic	Rhonda Powell	11,396	16.7
Democratic	Angela Rogensues	9,503	13.9
Democratic	Huwaida Arraf	8,846	13.0
Democratic	Henry Yanez	5,891	8.6
Total votes		68,289	100.0

=== Republican primary ===
==== Candidates ====
===== Nominee =====
- John James, businessman, Iraq War veteran and nominee for the U.S. Senate in 2018 and 2020

===== Eliminated in primary =====
- Tony Marcinkewciz

===== Withdrawn =====
- Eric Esshaki, attorney and nominee for Michigan's 11th congressional district in 2020 (endorsed James)

===== Declined =====
- Mike Bishop, former U.S. representative (2015–2019) (endorsed James)
- Candice Miller, Macomb County Public Works Commissioner, former U.S. representative for Michigan's 10th congressional district (2003–2017), and former Michigan Secretary of State (1995–2003) (endorsed James)

==== Endorsements ====
John James

Executive branch officials

- Donald Trump, 45th president of the United States (2017–2021)

U.S. representatives

- Mike Bishop, U.S. representative for Michigan's 8th congressional district (2015–2019), Majority Leader of the Michigan Senate (2007–2011)
- Candice Miller, U.S. representative for Michigan's 10th congressional district (2003–2017), 40th secretary of state of Michigan (1995–2003)

Organizations

- American Conservative Union
- Americans for Prosperity Action
- Tea Party Express

==== Polling ====
Poll source	Date(s) administered	Sample size	Margin of error	Eric Esshaki	John James	Undecided
Target Insyght	January 25–27, 2022	~230 (LV)	± 6.5%	7%	68%	24%

==== Results ====
Republican primary results
Party	Candidate	Votes	%
Republican	John James	63,417	86.3
Republican	Tony Marcinkewciz	10,079	13.7
Total votes		73,496	100.0

=== General election ===
==== Predictions ====
Source	Ranking	As of
The Cook Political Report	Likely R (flip)	August 10, 2022
Inside Elections	Lean R (flip)	August 3, 2022
Sabato's Crystal Ball	Lean R (flip)	June 15, 2022
Politico	Likely R (flip)	October 18, 2022
RCP	Likely R (flip)	June 9, 2022
Fox News	Likely R (flip)	July 11, 2022
DDHQ	Likely R (flip)	July 20, 2022
538	Likely R (flip)	October 6, 2022
The Economist	Lean R (flip)	November 1, 2022

==== Post-primary endorsements ====
Carl Marlinga (D)

Local politicians

- David Coulter, Oakland County Executive
- Mark Hackel, Macomb County Executive

Newspapers

- Detroit Free Press

Organizations

- American Federation of Teachers
- International Brotherhood of Electrical Workers
- Michigan AFL-CIO
- Michigan League of Conservation Voters
- Service Employees International Union
- Sierra Club
- Teamsters
- United Auto Workers Region 1

==== Polling ====
Aggregate polls

Source of poll aggregation	Dates administered	Dates updated	Carl Marlinga (D)	John James (R)	Undecided (Note: Calculated by taking the difference of 100% and all other candidates combined.)	Margin
FiveThirtyEight	January 26 – October 18, 2022	October 30, 2022	39.2%	44.7%	16.1%	James +5.5

Graphical summary

Poll source	Date(s) administered	Sample size	Margin of error	Carl Marlinga (D)	John James (R)	Other	Undecided
Target Insyght (D)	October 16–18, 2022	400 (LV)	± 5.0%	44%	42%	–	14%
The Glengariff Group, Inc.	October 4–6, 2022	400 (LV)	± 4.9%	36%	44%	5% (Note: "Third party candidate" with 5%)	13%
Mitchell Research (R)	August 16–21, 2022	429 (LV)	± 4.7%	38%	47%	–	15%
Target Insyght (D)	August 16–18, 2022	400 (LV)	± 5.0%	47%	45%	–	8%
Target Insyght (D)	May 24–27, 2022	400 (LV)	± 5.0%	44%	40%	–	16%
The Tarrance Group (R) (Note: This poll was sponsored by James's campaign)	April 24–26, 2022	400 (LV)	± 4.9%	41%	47%	–	12%
Target Insyght (D)	March 2022	– (LV)	–	48%	45%	–	7%
Target Insyght	January 25–27, 2022	500 (LV)	± 4.5%	46%	43%	–	11%

Hypothetical polling

Carl Marlinga vs. Eric Esshaki

Poll source	Date(s) administered	Sample size	Margin of error	Carl Marlinga (D)	Eric Esshaki (R)	Undecided
Target Insyght	January 25–27, 2022	500 (LV)	± 4.5%	52%	31%	17%

Andy Levin vs. John James

Poll source	Date(s) administered	Sample size	Margin of error	Andy Levin (D)	John James (R)	Undecided
Cygnal (R)	November 17–18, 2021	413 (LV)	± 4.8%	42%	50%	–

Haley Stevens vs. John James

Poll source	Date(s) administered	Sample size	Margin of error	Haley Stevens (D)	John James (R)	Undecided
Cygnal (R)	November 17–18, 2021	413 (LV)	± 4.8%	41%	50%	–

Michael Taylor vs. Eric Esshaki

Poll source	Date(s) administered	Sample size	Margin of error	Michael Taylor (D)	Eric Esshaki (R)	Undecided
Target Insyght	January 25–27, 2022	500 (LV)	± 4.5%	39%	34%	27%

Michael Taylor vs. John James

Poll source	Date(s) administered	Sample size	Margin of error	Michael Taylor (D)	John James (R)	Undecided
Target Insyght	January 25–27, 2022	500 (LV)	± 4.5%	46%	42%	13%

Generic Democrat vs. generic Republican

Poll source	Date(s) administered	Sample size	Margin of error	Generic Democrat	Generic Republican	Undecided
Cygnal (R)	November 17–18, 2021	413 (LV)	± 4.8%	42%	49%	–

==== Results ====
2022 Michigan's 10th congressional district election
Party	Candidate	Votes	%
Republican	John James	159,202	48.8
Democratic	Carl Marlinga	157,602	48.3
Working Class	Andrea Kirby	5,905	1.8
Libertarian	Mike Saliba	3,524	1.1
Write-in		4	0.0
Total votes		326,237	100.0
Republican win (new seat)			

== District 11 ==
2022 Michigan's 11th congressional district election
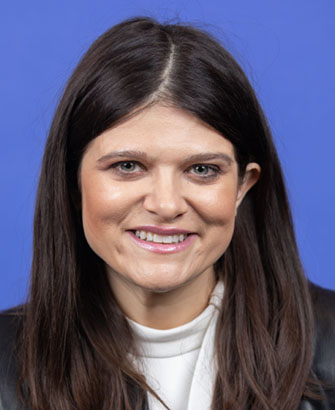

Nominee	Haley Stevens	Mark Ambrose
Party	Democratic	Republican
Popular vote	224,537	141,642
Percentage	61.3%	38.7%
- County results Stevens: 60–70%
U.S. Representatives before election
Andy Levin (Democratic)
Haley Stevens (Democratic)
Elected U.S. Representatives
Haley Stevens
Democratic

The 11th district is based solely in Oakland County and includes the cities of Royal Oak and Pontiac. Due to redistricting, there were two incumbents in this district – Democrat Haley Stevens, who was re-elected with 50.2% of the vote in 2020, and Democrat Andy Levin of the 9th congressional district, who was re-elected with 57.7% of the vote in 2020. The winner was Haley Stevens.

=== Democratic primary ===
==== Candidates ====
===== Nominee =====
- Haley Stevens, incumbent U.S. representative

===== Eliminated in primary =====
- Andy Levin, incumbent U.S. representative

==== Endorsements ====
Andy Levin

U.S. senators

- Bernie Sanders, U.S. senator from Vermont (2007–present)
- Elizabeth Warren, U.S. senator from Massachusetts (2013–present)

U.S. representatives

- Steve Cohen, U.S. representative from TN-09 (2007–present)
- Lloyd Doggett, U.S. representative from TX-35 (2013–present), former U.S. Representative from TX-25 (2005–2013), former U.S. Representative from TX-10 (1995–2005)
- Dwight Evans, U.S. representative from PA-03 (2019-present), former U.S. representative from PA-02 (2016–2019)
- Jesús "Chuy" García, U.S. representative from IL-04 (2019–present)
- Al Green, U.S. representative from TX-09 (2005–present)
- Raúl Grijalva, U.S. representative from AZ-03 (2013–present), former U.S. representative from AZ-07 (2003–2013)
- Pramila Jayapal, U.S. representative from WA-07 (2017–present)
- Jerry Nadler, U.S. representative from NY-11 (2013–present), former U.S. representative from NY-08 (1993–2013), former U.S. representative from NY-17 (1992–1993)
- Eleanor Holmes Norton, Delegate from DC-AL (1991–present)
- Mark Pocan, U.S. representative from WI-02 (2013–present)
- Jamie Raskin, U.S. representative from MD-08 (2017–present)
- Nydia Velázquez, U.S. representative from NY-07 (2013–present), former U.S. representative from NY-12 (1993–2013)
- Maxine Waters, U.S. representative from CA-43 (1991–present)

Local officials

- Tim Greimel, mayor of Pontiac (2022–present) and former state representative (2012–2019)

Individuals

- Jane Fonda, actress

Labor unions

- Communications Workers of America
- International Federation of Professional and Technical Engineers
- National Nurses United
- Seafarers International Union of North America
- Service Employees International Union
- UNITE HERE
- Utility Workers Union of America

Organizations

- Brand New Congress
- Congressional Progressive Caucus
- Council for a Livable World
- End Citizens United (co-endorsement with Stevens)
- Indivisible
- J Street
- NARAL Pro-Choice America (co-endorsement with Stevens)
- Our Revolution
- Planned Parenthood Action Fund (co-endorsement with Stevens)
- Progressive Change Campaign Committee
- Progressive Democrats of America
- Working Families Party
- Young Democrats of Michigan
Haley Stevens

Executive branch officials

- Hillary Clinton, former United States Secretary of State (2009–2013)

U.S. representatives

- Colin Allred, U.S. representative from TX-32 (2019–present)
- Cindy Axne, U.S. representative from IA-03 (2019–2023)
- Joyce Beatty, U.S. representative from OH-03 (2013–present)
- Suzan DelBene, U.S. representative from WA-01 (2012–present)
- Lois Frankel, U.S. representative from FL-21 (2013–present)
- Eddie Bernice Johnson, U.S. representative from TX-30 (1993–present)
- Annie Kuster, U.S. representative from NH-02 (2013–present)
- Brenda Lawrence, U.S. representative from MI-14 (2015–2023)
- Susie Lee, U.S. representative from NV-03 (2019–present)
- Chris Pappas, U.S. representative from NH-01 (2019–present)
- Linda Sánchez, U.S. representative from CA-38 (2003–present)
- Brad Schneider, U.S. representative from IL-10 (2013–2015; 2017–present)
- Jackie Speier, U.S. representative from CA-14 (2008–2023)
- Susan Wild, U.S. representative from PA-07 (2018–present)

Labor unions

- Communications Workers of America Local 4009
- Communications Workers of America Local 4123
- International Union of Bricklayers and Allied Craftworkers Local 2
- United Association Pipefitters & Steamfitters Local 636
- United Association Plumbers Local 98
- United Food and Commercial Workers Local 876

Organizations

- American Israel Public Affairs Committee
- Democratic Majority for Israel
- EMILY's List
- End Citizens United (co-endorsement with Levin)
- Feminist Majority PAC
- Jewish Dems
- League of Conservation Voters
- Let America Vote
- NARAL Pro-Choice America (co-endorsement with Levin)
- Planned Parenthood Action Fund (co-endorsement with Levin)
- Pro-Israel America
- Sierra Club

Newspapers

- Detroit Free Press (primary only)

==== Polling ====
Poll source	Date(s) administered	Sample size	Margin of error	Andy Levin	Haley Stevens	Undecided
Target Insyght	July 18–20, 2022	500 (LV)	± 4.5%	31%	58%	11%
Lake Research Partners (D) (Note: This poll was sponsored by Levin's campaign)	February 15–20, 2022	500 (LV)	± 4.4%	36%	36%	28%
Target Insyght	February 1–3, 2022	400 (LV)	± 5.0%	41%	41%	18%
Impact Research (D) (Note: This poll was sponsored by Stevens's campaign)	January 24–27, 2022	519 (LV)	± 4.3%	35%	42%	23%

==== Debate ====
2022 Michigan's 11th congressional district Democratic primary debate
No.	Date	Host	Moderator	Link	Democratic	Democratic
Key: P Participant A Absent N Not invited I Invited W Withdrawn						
Key: P Participant A Absent N Not invited I Invited W Withdrawn					Andy Levin	Haley Stevens
1	May 24, 2022	Oakland University; Oakland University Center for Civic Engagement	Emily Lawler; Chad Livengood		P	P

==== Results ====
Results by municipality Stevens: 50–60%; 60–70%; 70–80%; 80–90%; Levin: 50–60%; 60–70%; 70–80%

Results by precinct Stevens: 50–60%; 60–70%; 70–80%; 80–90%; Levin: 50–60%; 60–70%; 70–80%

Democratic primary results
Party	Candidate	Votes	%
Democratic	Haley Stevens (incumbent)	70,508	59.9
Democratic	Andy Levin (incumbent)	47,117	40.1
Total votes		117,625	100.0

=== Republican primary ===
==== Candidates ====
===== Nominee =====
- Mark Ambrose, financial analyst

===== Eliminated in primary =====
- Matthew DenOtter, realtor

==== Results ====
Republican primary results
Party	Candidate	Votes	%
Republican	Mark Ambrose	42,270	70.5
Republican	Matthew DenOtter	17,702	29.5
Total votes		59,972	100.0

=== General election ===
==== Predictions ====
Source	Ranking	As of
The Cook Political Report	Solid D	June 15, 2022
Inside Elections	Solid D	June 15, 2022
Sabato's Crystal Ball	Safe D	June 15, 2022
Politico	Solid D	November 7, 2022
RCP	Likely D	June 9, 2022
Fox News	Solid D	July 11, 2022
DDHQ	Solid D	July 20, 2022
538	Solid D	August 17, 2022
The Economist	Safe D	September 28, 2022

==== Results ====
2022 Michigan's 11th congressional district election
Party	Candidate	Votes	%
Democratic	Haley Stevens (incumbent)	224,537	61.3
Republican	Mark Ambrose	141,642	38.7
Total votes		366,179	100.0
Democratic hold			

== District 12 ==
2022 Michigan's 12th congressional district election
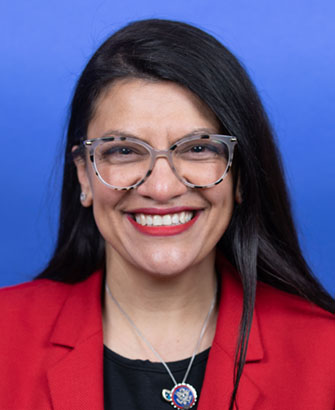

Nominee	Rashida Tlaib	Steven Elliott
Party	Democratic	Republican
Popular vote	196,643	72,888
Percentage	70.8%	26.3%
- County results Tlaib: 60–70% 80–90%
U.S. Representative before election
Brenda Lawrence (Democratic)
Rashida Tlaib (Democratic)
Elected U.S. Representative
Rashida Tlaib
Democratic

The 12th district is based in northern Wayne County and includes the cities of Dearborn and Southfield. Due to redistricting, the incumbent was Democrat Brenda Lawrence of the 14th congressional district, who was re-elected with 79.3% of the vote in 2020. On January 4, 2022, Lawrence announced that she would not seek re-election. Subsequently, Democrat Rashida Tlaib of the 13th congressional district announced she would be running in the district. Tlaib was re-elected in 2020 with 78.1% of the vote. The winner was Rashida Tlaib.

=== Democratic primary ===
==== Candidates ====
===== Nominee =====
- Rashida Tlaib, incumbent U.S. representative

===== Eliminated in primary =====
- Kelly Garrett, mayor of Lathrup Village
- Shanelle Jackson, former state representative, candidate for Michigan's 13th congressional district in 2012 and 2018
- Janice Winfrey, Detroit city clerk and candidate for Michigan's 13th congressional district in 2016

===== Declined =====
- Brenda Lawrence, incumbent U.S. representative

==== Endorsements ====
Shanelle Jackson

Newspapers and publications

- The Detroit News (Democratic primary only)
Rashida Tlaib

U.S. senators

- Bernie Sanders, U.S. senator from Vermont (2007–present)

Organizations

- Brand New Congress
- Democracy for America
- Democratic Socialists of America
- Feminist Majority PAC
- Jewish Voice for Peace Action Fund
- Justice Democrats
- League of Conservation Voters
- Planned Parenthood Action Fund
- Progressive Change Campaign Committee
- Progressive Democrats of America
- Sierra Club
- Sunrise Movement
- Working Families Party

Newspapers

- Detroit Free Press
Janice Winfrey

Organizations

- Pro-Israel America

==== Polling ====
Poll source	Date(s) administered	Sample size	Margin of error	Phil Cavanagh	Kelly Garrett	Shanelle Jackson	Maureen Miller Bronsan	Rashida Tlaib	William Wild	Janice Winfrey	Undecided
Target Insyght (D) (Note: This poll was sponsored by the Michigan Democratic Party Black Caucus)	January 18–20, 2022	600 (LV)	± 4.0%	3%	6%	0%	2%	62%	13%	4%	10%

==== Results ====
Democratic primary results by precinct Tlaib: 40–50%; 50–60%; 60–70%; 70–80%; 80–90%; >90%; Winfrey: 40–50%; 50–60%; 60–70%; Tie: 40–50%

Democratic primary results
Party	Candidate	Votes	%
Democratic	Rashida Tlaib (incumbent)	61,635	63.8
Democratic	Janice Winfrey	21,636	22.4
Democratic	Kelly Garrett	8,334	8.6
Democratic	Shanelle Jackson	4,927	5.1
Total votes		96,532	100.0

=== Republican primary ===
==== Candidates ====
===== Nominee =====
- Steven Elliott, businessman

===== Eliminated in primary =====
- James Hooper, tradesman
- Hassan Nehme, auto worker

==== Endorsements ====
Steven Elliott

Newspapers and publications

- The Detroit News (Republican primary only)

==== Results ====
Republican primary results
Party	Candidate	Votes	%
Republican	Steven Elliott	14,431	52.9
Republican	James Hooper	9,651	35.4
Republican	Hassan Nehme	3,196	11.7
Total votes		27,278	100.0

=== General election ===
==== Predictions ====
Source	Ranking	As of
The Cook Political Report	Solid D	December 28, 2021
Inside Elections	Solid D	January 13, 2022
Sabato's Crystal Ball	Safe D	January 4, 2022
Politico	Solid D	April 5, 2022
RCP	Safe D	June 9, 2022
Fox News	Solid D	July 11, 2022
DDHQ	Solid D	July 20, 2022
538	Solid D	June 30, 2022
The Economist	Safe D	September 28, 2022

==== Results ====
2022 Michigan's 12th congressional district election
Party	Candidate	Votes	%
Democratic	Rashida Tlaib (incumbent)	196,643	70.8
Republican	Steven Elliott	72,888	26.3
Working Class	Gary Walkowicz	8,046	2.9
Total votes		277,577	100.0
Democratic hold			

== District 13 ==
2022 Michigan's 13th congressional district election
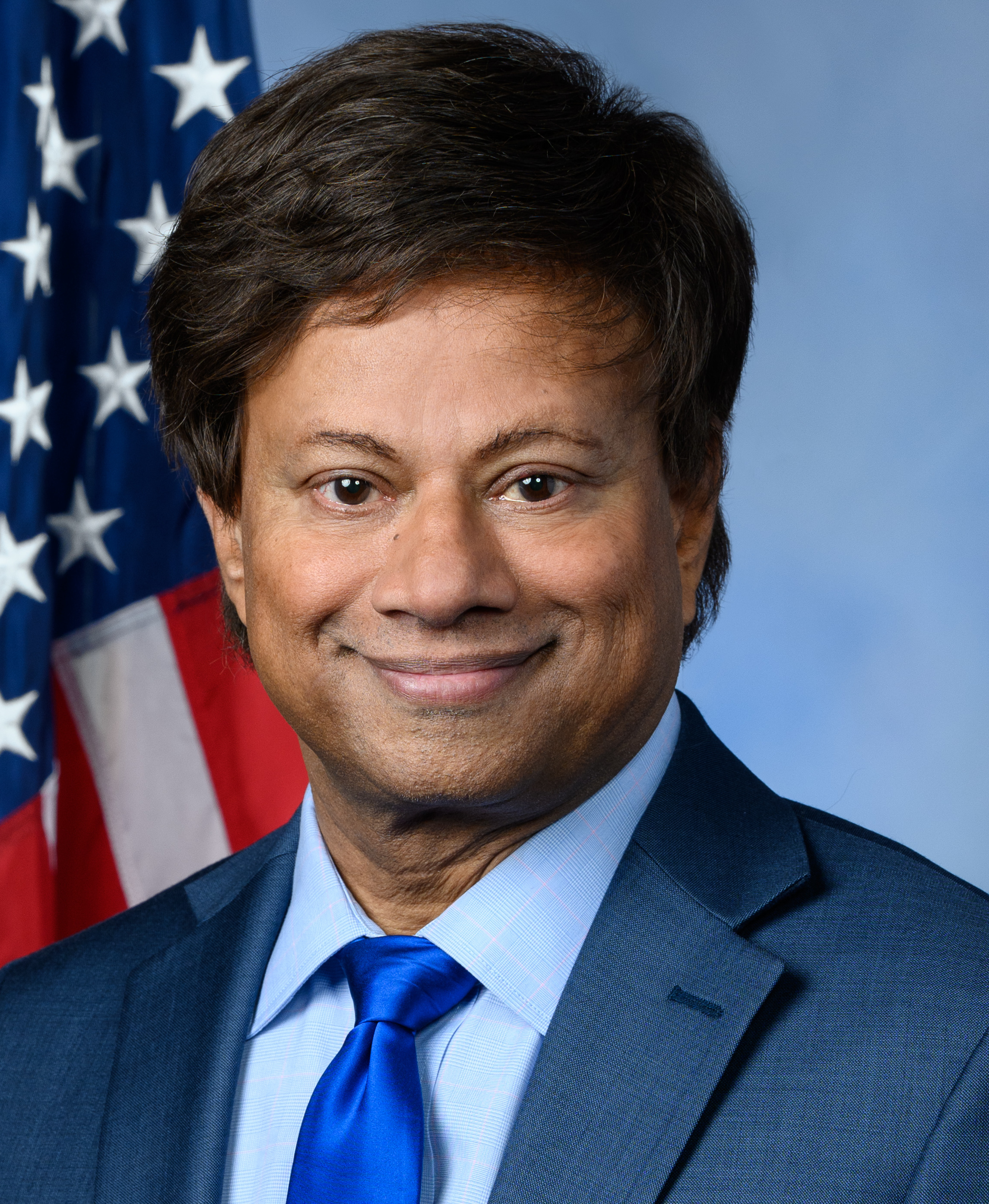

Nominee	Shri Thanedar	Martell Bivings
Party	Democratic	Republican
Popular vote	166,650	56,187
Percentage	71.08%	23.97%
- Precinct results Thanedar: 40–50% 50–60% 60–70% 70–80% 80–90% >90% Bivings: 40–50% 50–60% 60–70% 70–80%
U.S. Representative before election
None (new seat)
Elected U.S. Representative
Shri Thanedar
Democratic

The 13th district is based solely in Wayne County and includes most of Detroit and the cities of Taylor and Romulus. Due to redistricting, this was an open district with no incumbent. The winner was Shri Thanedar.

=== Democratic primary ===
==== Candidates ====
===== Nominee =====
- Shri Thanedar, state representative

===== Eliminated in primary =====
- John Conyers III, son of former U.S. Representative John Conyers
- Sherry Gay-Dagnogo, Detroit school board member and former state representative
- Michael Griffie, lawyer and official for Teach For America Detroit
- Adam Hollier, state senator
- Sharon McPhail, former Detroit General Counsel
- Sam Riddle, organizer and felon
- Portia Roberson, CEO of Focus: HOPE, Michigan Civil Rights Commissioner
- Lorrie Rutledge, businesswoman

===== Withdrew =====
- Ralph Godbee Jr., former Detroit Police Chief

===== Declined =====
- Garlin Gilchrist, lieutenant governor of Michigan
- Rashida Tlaib, incumbent U.S. representative (running in Michigan's 12th congressional district)

==== Endorsements ====
Adam Hollier

Local officials

- Mike Duggan, mayor of Detroit

Organizations

- AIPAC
- New Politics
Portia Roberson

U.S. representatives

- Brenda Lawrence, U.S. representative from MI-14

Newspapers

- Detroit Free Press

Organizations

- EMILY's List

Labor unions

- American Federation of Teachers

==== Polling ====
Poll source	Date(s) administered	Sample size	Margin of error	Hansen Clarke	John Conyers III	Shawna Diggs	Sherry Gay-Dagnogo	Ralph Godbee	Michael Griffie	Adam Hollier	Angela McIntosh	Sharon McPhail	Sam Riddle	Portia Roberson	Lorrie Rutledge	Shri Thanedar	Adrian Tonon	Undecided
Target Insyght	July 19–22, 2022	500 (LV)	± 4.5%	–	7%	–	5%	–	5%	16%	–	7%	4%	17%	0%	22%	–	16%
Target Insyght	May 3–5, 2022	600 (LV)	± 4.0%	–	15%	–	9%	–	2%	6%	0%	20%	2%	9%	0%	12%	0%	25%
Public Policy Polling (D) (Note: This poll was sponsored by the 13th Congressional District Democratic Party Organization)	March 21–22, 2022	463 (LV)	± 4.6%	–	19%	–	6%	5%	0%	6%	–	9%	–	4%	–	7%	0%	43%
Target Insyght (D)	February 22–24, 2022	600 (LV)	± 4.0%	–	–	–	7%	11%	0%	6%	–	24%	1%	7%	–	12%	–	31%
Target Insyght (D)	January 18–20, 2022	600 (LV)	± 4.0%	23%	–	0%	11%	1%	4%	5%	–	25%	–	7%	–	7%	–	16%

==== Results ====
Democratic primary results
Party	Candidate	Votes	%
Democratic	Shri Thanedar	22,314	28.3
Democratic	Adam Hollier	18,517	23.5
Democratic	Portia Roberson	13,318	16.9
Democratic	John Conyers III	6,778	8.6
Democratic	Sherry Gay-Dagnogo	6,440	8.2
Democratic	Sharon McPhail	5,043	6.4
Democratic	Michael Griffie	3,636	4.6
Democratic	Sam Riddle	1,841	2.3
Democratic	Lorrie Rutledge	916	1.2
Write-in		6	0.0
Total votes		78,809	100.0

=== Republican primary ===
==== Candidates ====
===== Nominee =====
- Martell Bivings, policy analyst

==== Results ====
Republican primary results
Party	Candidate	Votes	%
Republican	Martell Bivings	19,618	100.0
Total votes		19,618	100.0

=== General election ===
==== Predictions ====
Source	Ranking	As of
The Cook Political Report	Solid D	December 28, 2021
Inside Elections	Solid D	January 13, 2022
Sabato's Crystal Ball	Safe D	January 4, 2022
Politico	Solid D	April 5, 2022
RCP	Safe D	June 9, 2022
Fox News	Solid D	July 11, 2022
DDHQ	Solid D	July 20, 2022
538	Solid D	June 30, 2022
The Economist	Safe D	September 28, 2022

==== Endorsements ====
Shri Thanedar (D)

Organizations

- League of Conservation Voters
- Sierra Club

==== Results ====
2022 Michigan's 13th congressional district election
Party	Candidate	Votes	%
Democratic	Shri Thanedar	166,650	71.1
Republican	Martell Bivings	56,187	24.0
Working Class	Simone Coleman	8,833	3.8
U.S. Taxpayers'	Chris Dardzinski	2,769	1.2
Write-in		5	0.0
Total votes		234,444	100.0
Democratic win (new seat)			

== Notes ==
Partisan clients
