= Democratic Congressional Campaign Committee =

Democratic Party's committee to support Congressional candidates

- Abbreviation: DCCC
- Founded: 1866; 160 years ago
- Registration no.: C00000935
- Purpose: To elect Democrats to the United States House of Representatives
- Location(s): 430 South Capitol Street SE, Washington, D.C. 20003, United States
- Chair: Suzan DelBene (WA–1)
- Vice Chairs: Lizzie Fletcher (TX–7); Sara Jacobs (CA–51); Rob Menendez (NJ–8); Mark Pocan (WI–2)
- Website: dccc.org
- Formerly called: Democratic National Congressional Committee

The Democratic Congressional Campaign Committee (DCCC) (Note: Pronounced "D-triple-C"/diː ˈtrɪpəl siː/ DEE TRIH-pəl SEE; sometimes abbreviated as /diː trɪp/ DEE TRIP.) is the Democratic Hill committee for the United States House of Representatives, working to elect Democrats to that body. The DCCC recruits candidates, raises funds and organizes races in districts expected to yield politically notable or close elections. The committee consists of the chairperson (who according to Democratic Caucus rules is a fellow member of the caucus appointed by the party leader in the House), their staff, and other Democratic members of Congress in various executive roles.

The chairperson of the DCCC is the sixth-ranking position among House Democrats when they are in the majority: after the speaker, the majority leader, the majority whip, the assistant Democratic leader, and the Democratic Caucus chairperson. In a congress with democrats in the minority, the DCCC position is the fifth most senior role, as the party does not then nominate a speaker.

The current DCCC chair is Suzan DelBene of Washington, who assumed the position in 2023.

== History ==
The DCCC was created in 1866 as the Democratic National Congressional Committee. Due to the reform of campaign finance legislation in 2004, the DCCC divides its activities among two organizations prior to Election Day:

1. One organization (the "Coordinated" campaign) continues to work on congressional campaigns, offering relevant campaign advice.
2. The other organization (the "Independent Expenditure" campaign), makes independent expenditures in congressional districts on behalf of the campaigns but is not allowed to coordinate activities with the campaigns.

In recent elections, the DCCC has played an expansive role in supporting Democratic candidates with independently produced television ads and mail pieces.

Rahm Emanuel assumed the position of DCCC committee chair after the death of the previous chair, Bob Matsui, at the end of the 2004 election cycle. Emanuel led the Democratic Party's successful effort to capture the majority in the House of Representatives in the 2006 elections. After Emanuel's election as chair of the Democratic Caucus, Chris Van Hollen became committee chair for the 110th Congress and the 2008 elections. He continued through the 2010 elections. Steve Israel served as chair for the 2012 and 2014 election cycles. For the 2016 election cycle, Democratic minority leader Nancy Pelosi appointed congressman Ben Ray Luján to serve as the committee's chair. Luján was selected to serve again for the 2018 election cycle.

For the 2020 and 2022 election cycles, DCCC chairs were elected by the caucus, rather than selected by the party leader. Representative Sean Patrick Maloney from upstate New York was elected for both cycles; however, in what was seen as an act of self-sacrifice insofar as he concentrated on the national slate of races over his own seat, Maloney lost his bid for reelection in 2022. Subsequent to that 2022 election cycle, the Democratic caucus voted to return to procedures whereby DCCC chair would be appointed by the party leader. Suzan DelBene of Washington, after being nominated by House Democratic leader Hakeem Jeffries, assumed the DCCC chairpersonship in 2023.

In 2022, workers at the DCCC announced they were forming a union affiliated with the Teamsters. Their union was immediately voluntarily recognized.

== Fundraising rules and restrictions under campaign finance laws ==
There are specific rules regarding who can donate to the DCCC, as well as limits on total donation amounts.

An individual can contribute as much as $41,300 ($82,600 per couple) per calendar year to the DCCC's general fund for use at the DCCC's sole discretion. Unless informed by the DCCC of a different allocation, the next $123,900 of an individual's contribution will be for the DCCC's recount fund and all additional amounts, up to the legal limits, will be for the DCCC's building fund.

Certain contributions are prohibited: donations from foreign nationals, federal contractors, national banks, corporations and labor organizations, for example, are not permitted.

== Controversies ==
=== Consultant blacklist ===
After Alexandria Ocasio-Cortez won her upset congressional victory over Joe Crowley in 2018, the DCCC implemented a policy blacklisting consultants who worked for primary opponents of Democratic Party incumbents. Highly unpopular among progressives, the organization rolled back the policy in 2021.

=== Primary preferences ===
In the 2018 election cycle, the DCCC released negative information about candidate Laura Moser, who ran for US Congress in Texas' 7th congressional district. The move backfired, as Moser gained donations and support en route to making the runoff (between the final two candidates) election; however she was beaten finally by Lizzie Fletcher. A month after the attack on Moser, the DCCC showed its preferences in another Texas primary, supporting Colin Allred. The decisions were two among many similar choices made by the organization throughout its history. Similar criticism carried into the next election cycle, prompting Progressive Caucus member Ro Khanna to say:

This unprecedented grab of power is a slap in the face of Democratic voters across the nation. It's something even Rahm Emanuel would not have done and is totally tone-deaf to the grassroots activists across our nation. Voters are sick of the status quo holding on to power and stifling new voices. They are sick of D.C. politicians who care more about holding on to power than a true competition of ideas.

=== Russian hacking ===
In July 2016, the DCCC said it was hacked. Subsequently, a person described as a hacker and known as "Guccifer 2.0" (Russian Main Intelligence Directorate persona) reportedly released documents and information that were obtained from the cyberattack on the DCCC.

=== Supporting election denier opponents ===
In the 2022 primary cycle, the DCCC assisted Republican candidates that supported the claim that the 2020 election was stolen from Donald Trump. This assistance took the form of attack ads aired during Republican primaries, the content of which ostensibly decried the further-right candidate's election denialism and other views described as "dangerous", with the aim of making that candidate more appealing to Republican primary voters. It was hoped that those more extreme Republican candidates would be more vulnerable to defeat in the subsequent general election. For instance, in Michigan, they aired ads supposedly against John Gibbs, a far-right challenger to incumbent Peter Meijer, who had voted to impeach Donald Trump in the second impeachment. Gibbs ultimately lost in the general election to Democratic candidate Hillary Scholten.

=== Donations made by Gaurav Srivastava ===
In March 2024, the DCCC froze hundreds of thousands of dollars in donations from Indian businessman Gaurav Srivastava after he was accused of fraudulently pretending to be associated with the Central Intelligence Agency. In 2023, Srivastava had made several donations totaling almost $290,000 to the DCCC as chairman of Unity Resources Group. Campaign officials said the funds were placed in escrow, following concerns about their source and legality.

== List of chairs ==
Name	State	Term of service
James Rood Doolittle	Wisconsin	1868
Joseph Clay Stiles Blackburn	Kentucky	1878
William A. Wallace	Pennsylvania	1880
William Rosecrans	California	1882
Arthur Pue Gorman	Maryland	1884
John E. Kenna	West Virginia	1886
James T. Jones	Alabama	1888
Roswell P. Flower	New York	1890
John L. Mitchell	Wisconsin	1892
Charles James Faulkner	West Virginia	1894–1896
Stephen M. White	California	1898
James D. Richardson	Tennessee	1900
James M. Griggs	Georgia	1902–1908
James Tilghman Lloyd	Missouri	1909–1913
Frank Ellsworth Doremus	Michigan	1913–1917
Scott Ferris	Oklahoma	1917–1921
Arthur B. Rouse	Kentucky	1921–1924
William Allan Oldfield	Arkansas	1925–1928
Joseph W. Byrns Sr.	Tennessee	1928–1935
Patrick H. Drewry	Virginia	1935–1947
Michael J. Kirwan	Ohio	1947–1969
Michael A. Feighan	Ohio	1969–1971
Tip O'Neill	Massachusetts	1971–1973
Wayne Hays	Ohio	1973–1976
James C. Corman	California	1976–1981
Tony Coelho	California	1981–1987
Beryl Anthony Jr.	Arkansas	1987–1991
Victor H. Fazio	California	1991–1995
Martin Frost	Texas	1995–1999
Patrick J. Kennedy	Rhode Island	1999–2001
Nita Lowey	New York	2001–2003
Bob Matsui	California	2003–2005
Rahm Emanuel	Illinois	2005–2007
Chris Van Hollen	Maryland	2007–2011
Steve Israel	New York	2011–2015
Ben Ray Luján	New Mexico	2015–2019
Cheri Bustos	Illinois	2019–2021
Sean Patrick Maloney	New York	2021–2023
Suzan DelBene	Washington	2023–present

== See also ==
- Democratic National Committee
- Democratic Senatorial Campaign Committee
- National Republican Congressional Committee
- National Republican Senatorial Committee
