= Mike Bright =

Mike Bright may refer to:

- Mike Bright (volleyball) (1937–2017), American volleyball player
- Mike Bright (basketball), American basketball player

== See also ==
- Michael Bright, American finance executive
