= John Gibbs (government official) =

American government executive

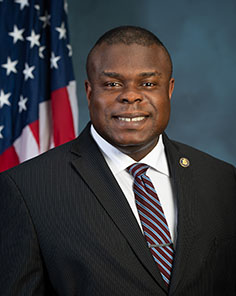
- Official portrait, 2018

Administrator of Ottawa County, Michigan
- In office January 3, 2023 – February 29, 2024
- Preceded by: John Shay
- Succeeded by: Jon Anderson

Assistant Secretary of Housing and Urban Development for Community Planning and Development
- Acting; March 2020 – January 20, 2021
- President: Donald Trump
- Preceded by: Neal Rackleff
- Succeeded by: Vacant

Personal details
- Born: Lansing, Michigan, U.S.
- Party: Republican
- Education: Stanford University (BS); Harvard University (MPA)

John Gibbs is an American far-right politician and political commentator. A member of the Republican Party, Gibbs was a software engineer and missionary before entering politics. During the Donald Trump administration, he held roles in the U.S. Department of Housing and Urban Development, and was acting Assistant Secretary of Housing and Urban Development for Community Planning and Development. Gibbs has a history of making false, inflammatory, and conspiratorial remarks on his Twitter feed.

In July 2020, Trump nominated Gibbs to be director of the United States Office of Personnel Management, but he was never confirmed by the Senate. Gibbs promoted Trump's false claims that the 2020 presidential election was stolen. He was the Republican nominee for Michigan's 3rd congressional district in the 2022 elections, having defeated incumbent Peter Meijer in the primary, but lost the general election to Democratic nominee Hillary Scholten in a landslide. In early 2023, the Ottawa County Board of Commissioners, dominated by a newly elected ultraconservative majority, appointed Gibbs county administrator. His time in the role was tumultuous, and in February 2024, the county board fired Gibbs, citing gross misconduct.

== Early life and education ==
Gibbs is a native of Lansing, Michigan. He earned a Bachelor of Science degree in computer science from Stanford University and a Master of Public Administration from the Harvard Kennedy School.

== Personal life ==
Gibbs was raised in the Pentecostal faith and served as a missionary in Japan after studying abroad there. Gibbs later converted to Catholicism and attends the Traditional Latin Mass.

== Career ==
=== Business ===
Gibbs was employed by Symantec, Palm, and Apple as a software engineer. He worked in Japan for the evangelical Christian ministry WorldVenture for nearly seven years and is fluent in Japanese.

=== Political commentary ===
Gibbs is a far-right conspiracy theorist; he has a history of making false, inflammatory, and conspiratorial remarks on his Twitter feed, including numerous tweets promoting fringe concepts and figures. On four occasions, he spread the false conspiracy theory that John Podesta, the chairman of Hillary Clinton's 2016 presidential campaign, took part in a "Satanic ritual," a claim propagated by far-right bloggers. In October 2016, Gibbs defended an alt-right figure who had frequently posted anti-Semitic comments and had been banned from Twitter. In early 2016, Gibbs used the term "cucks," a derogatory word applied by the far-right to attack moderate Republicans; he has also attacked Democrats as the party of "Islam, gender-bending, anti-police." In a July 2020 interview with the Washington Examiner, in response to criticism of his past remarks, he said, "I don't really see anything to apologize for." Later, during a Senate testimony, he said, "I regret that it's unfortunately become an issue."

=== Trump administration ===
After working as a political commentator, Gibbs joined the United States Department of Housing and Urban Development (HUD) as a political appointee and advisor to Secretary Ben Carson. He was a frequent contributor to The Federalist, a right-wing website, and wrote in support of Donald Trump's 2016 presidential campaign. He endorsed the notion that incoming federal employees should be "loyal" to Trump.

Gibbs did not have housing experience before his appointment to HUD. Gibbs' first position at HUD was director of the Strong Cities, Strong Communities initiative. By the time Gibbs was appointed, the Trump administration had already shuttered the Obama-era initiative, and so Gibbs never directed the program. In August 2017, Gibbs became a senior adviser in HUD's Office of the assistant secretary for community planning and development, and then became acting assistant secretary in March 2020, replacing then-Principal Assistant Deputy Secretary David Woll as head of the agency.

In 2020, Trump nominated Gibbs to be director of the Office of Personnel Management, which oversees the federal workforce of about 2.1 million employees and acts as the executive branch's human resources function. During a September 2020 confirmation hearing before the Senate Homeland Security and Government Affairs Committee, Gibbs deflected questions over past conspiracy tweets. Senators in both parties expressed concerns about Gibbs' fitness to hold office. His nomination was opposed by federal employees' associations, including the National Treasury Employees Union and Senior Executives Association, which cited Gibbs' history of inflammatory comments and expressed concerns about his commitment to the merit system.

Gibbs' nomination was "held over" by the committee in September 2020, meaning that he did not receive a vote. He was never confirmed by the Senate, and his nomination lapsed in January 2021 at the end of the 116th Congress. In the final months of the Trump administration, Trump appointed Gibbs as a member of the administration's 1776 Commission.

After Trump was defeated in his bid for reelection in 2020, Gibbs promoted Trump's false claims that the election was "stolen" from him. Gibbs later continued to push election falsehoods while running for a seat in Congress in 2022.

=== 2022 congressional campaign ===
In November 2021, Gibbs announced his campaign for the U.S. House of Representatives from Michigan's 3rd congressional district. He ran in the Republican primary election against incumbent congressman Peter Meijer, who was one of ten House Republicans to vote to impeach President Trump over the January 6 United States Capitol attack. Gibbs ran as a far-right candidate. Trump endorsed Gibbs a few days after he announced his candidacy. The district is based in Grand Rapids.

During the Republican primary campaign, Gibbs made his Trump endorsement and support for false election claims the centerpieces of his candidacy. He continued to deny that Joe Biden had been legitimately elected president in 2020, and falsely claimed that the 2020 election results were "mathematically impossible". He criticized Meijer for voting to impeach Trump, as well as for voting for supporting U.S. humanitarian and military aid to Ukraine and for voting in favor of bipartisan gun safety legislation following a gun massacre at an elementary school in Uvalde, Texas.

In the final days of the primary, the Democratic Congressional Campaign Committee bought TV ads designed to raise Gibbs' profile, believing that Meijer would be the more difficult opponent in the general election. On August 2, 2022, Gibbs defeated Meijer in the primary election. Meijer said he would not support Gibbs in the November election.

In September 2022, CNN reported that as a student at Stanford, Gibbs founded a self-described think tank called the Society for the Critique of Feminism. The group's webpage said that women do not "posess [sic] the characteristics necessary to govern" and that women should not have the right to vote. A spokesperson for the Gibbs campaign responded "Of course, John does not believe that women shouldn't vote or shouldn't work." Gibbs said the site "was made as a satire, of trolling against the liberals on campus."

In the general election, Democratic nominee Hillary Scholten flipped the district and defeated Gibbs, winning 55% to 42%.

=== Ottawa County Administrator ===
In 2022, a new ultraconservative majority was elected to the Ottawa County Board of Commissioners, as part of a slate supported by a group called Ottawa Impact. On January 3, 2023, the new commission—led by Chair Joe Moss and Vice Chair Sylvia Rhodea, who co-founded Ottawa Impact—approved a resolution that fired the previous county administrator and immediately hired Gibbs.

Gibbs soon came into conflict with county commissioners and employees. In July 2023, the deputy county administrator resigned (effective August 4, 2023), citing a poor working relationship with Gibbs; the deputy wrote in his resignation letter that Gibbs had a "pattern of concerning administrative decisions" and said that Gibbs had not adequately communicated with him or complied with county policies on hiring personnel.

In August 2023, Gibbs hired a new senior executive aide, but refused to reveal the name of the aide to the county commissioners. It was later revealed that Gibbs' new hire was Jordan Epperson, an 23-year-old ultraconservative aide to Michigan legislator Neil Friske, a member of the "Grand New Party" far-right faction of Michigan Republicans. Gibbs had sought the creation of a "senior executive aide" in place of an earlier "executive assistant" position; Gibbs narrowly won the county commission's approval for the upgraded position (which cost an additional $37,000 in compensation) in March 2023. Gibbs argued that he needed an assistant to serve as his "body man" and chief of staff. Emails obtained by the press under Michigan's freedom-of-information laws show that Gibbs ordered Epperson's hiring despite objections from other county officials. Gibbs selected Epperson although he had only one of the five "mandatory criteria" listed in the county's job posting, picking him over the other finalist, who had two decades' more experience and more of the required qualifications. The other finalist subsequently sued the county for age discrimination.

In early 2024, several county employees and commissioners alleged serious misconduct by Gibbs. Allegations included that Gibbs had threatened to kill the county's corporation counsel; that he repeatedly made disparaging and sexual comments about female officials; that Gibbs had created a hostile work environment, including by asking a county employee to bug his office with a hidden camera to record discussions; that Gibbs had disparaged commissioners for their Protestant faith; and that Gibbs was insubordinate to the county commission. Gibbs sought a $630,000 payment from the county in exchange for his resignation. In early February, the Commission voted to remove hiring authority from Gibbs. In a special meeting on February 22, 2024, the Commission voted to place Gibbs on paid administrative leave. Through his attorney, Gibbs denied all wrongdoing. On February 29, 2024, the Ottawa County Board voted 10–1 to fire Gibbs, passing a motion to determine that he has "been dishonest, committed gross misconduct, and/or committed willful malfeasance" and thus to terminate his contract for cause.

In March, 2024, Gibbs sued the county board for multiple claims, including violation of the Michigan Whistleblower Protection Act and Breach of Contract.

On January 29, 2025, after more moderate Republicans won control of the Ottawa County board, it was reported that Gibbs and the board settled the lawsuit for $190,000. Gibbs' termination was rescinded and his employment file had all references to his termination removed. In addition, the board accepted Gibbs' resignation, retroactive to February 2024.

== Electoral history ==
2022 Michigan's House of Representatives election for District 3 - Republican primary results
Party	Candidate	Votes	%
Republican	John Gibbs	54,065	51.8
Republican	Peter Meijer (incumbent)	50,271	48.2
Total votes		104,336	100.0

2022 Michigan's House of Representatives election for District 3
Party	Candidate	Votes	%
Democratic	Hillary Scholten	185,989	54.87
Republican	John Gibbs	142,229	41.96
Libertarian	Jamie Lewis	6,634	1.96
Working Class	Louis Palus	4,136	1.22
Total votes		338,988	100.0
Democratic gain from Republican			
