= J. Paul Compton Jr. =

American lawyer

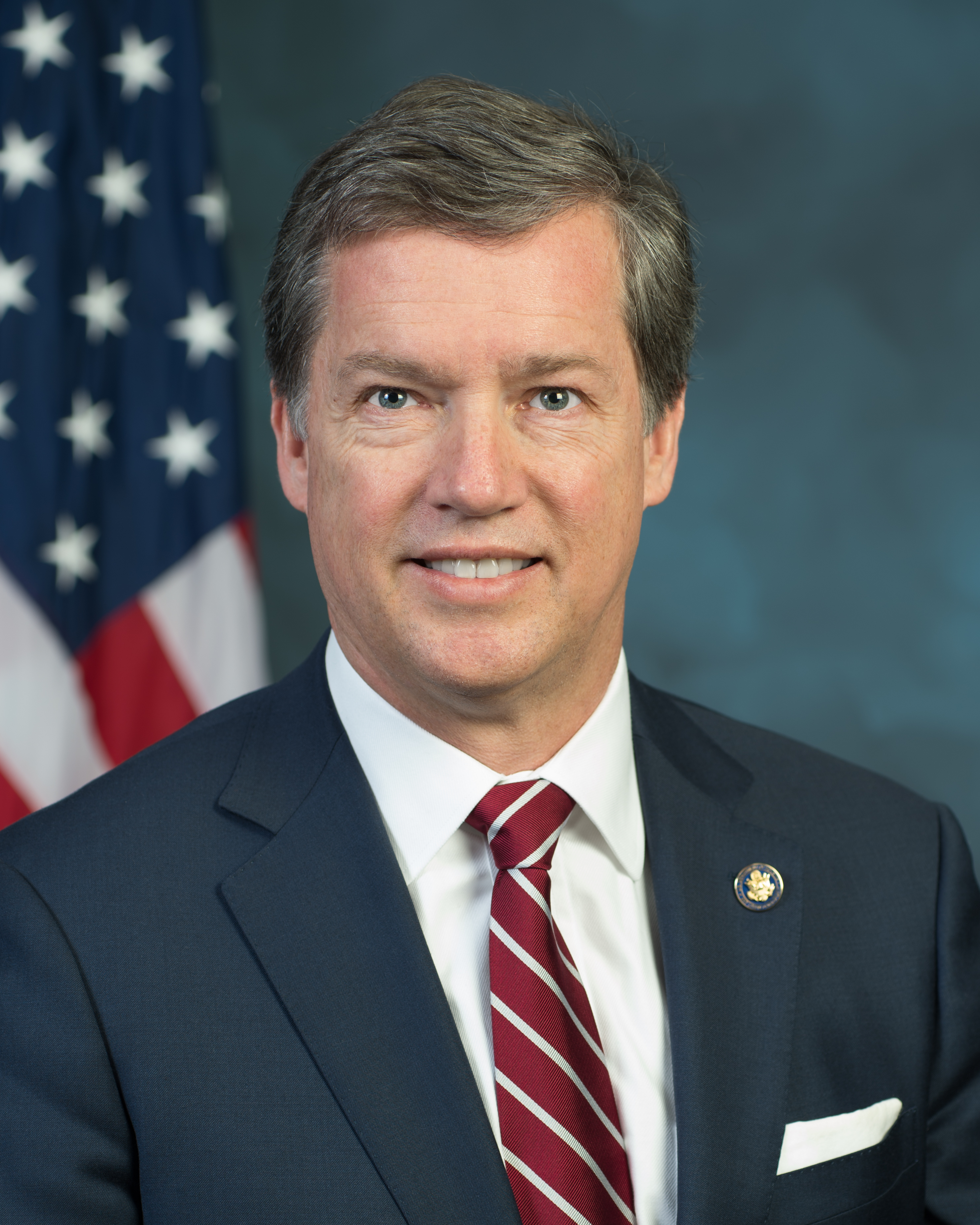

General Counsel of the United States Department of Housing and Urban Development
- In office January 5, 2018 – January 20, 2021
- President: Donald Trump
- Preceded by: Helen R. Kanovsky
- Succeeded by: Damon Smith

Personal details
- Born: Georgiana, Alabama, U.S.
- Spouse: Dana
- Children: 3
- Education: University of Alabama; University of Virginia School of Law

Jerome Paul Compton Jr. is an American lawyer who served as General Counsel at the United States Department of Housing and Urban Development. Prior to confirmation in a bipartisan vote of 62–34 by the United States Senate to the position of General Counsel, he was a partner at Bradley Arant Boult Cummings. He is a Republican and a long-time member of the Federalist Society.

Compton attended the University of Alabama as an undergraduate. He was named a Truman Scholar in 1983. He graduated summa cum laude in 1985 and was named the College of Commerce's Outstanding Student the same year. He received his J.D. from the University of Virginia School of Law. After graduating from law school, he joined the law firm of Bradley Arant Boult Cummings in 1989, where he eventually became a partner and chairman of the finance committee. He advised banks and other financial institutions about investing in affordable housing and community development projects.

At HUD, Compton worked under Secretary Ben Carson and alongside current Secretary Scott Turner and Deputy Secretary Andrew Hughes. Current General Counsel David Woll, Jr. was a senior member of Compton's Office of General Counsel Staff. Compton led efforts to reform the New York City Housing Authority, including installing an outside monitor, led the HUD legal team in bringing a charge under the Fair Housing Act against Facebook, Inc., developed sweeping proposed revisions to the disparate impact regulations of HUD and led a team working with the U.S. Department of Justice to reform application of the False Claims Act to Federal Housing Administration lenders.

He is outside General Counsel to and an ex officio board member of the Alabama Affordable Housing Association. He was previously on the board of directors of the Truman Scholars Association.

After leaving HUD, Compton was a co-founder of Compton Jones Dresher LLP, a law firm focused on commercial real estate transactions and financial regulatory matters. Compton Jones Dresher LLP is based in Birmingham, Alabama. In the spring of 2026 he is serving as an adjunct professor at the University of Alabama School of Law, teaching a class on development of multifamily real estate.
