= Neal Rackleff =

American lawyer (born 1964)

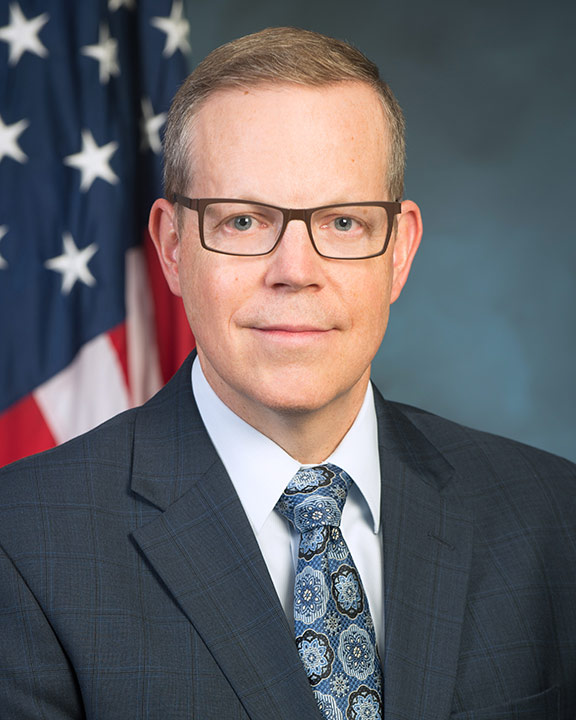

Assistant Secretary of Housing and Urban Development for Community Planning and Development
- In office October 18, 2017 – November 2018
- President: Donald Trump

Personal details
- Born: Neal James Rackleff; June 6, 1964 (age 61) Orange County, California, U.S.
- Education: Brigham Young University; USC Gould School of Law

Neal James Rackleff (born June 6, 1964) is a partner at law firm Locke Lord, where he focuses on economic development, affordable housing, and inner-city revitalization. He was Assistant Secretary of Housing and Urban Development for Community Planning and Development in the United States Department of Housing and Urban Development from October 2017 to November 2018. Rackleff previously served as director of the City of Houston's Housing and Community Development Department, where he oversaw the city's community development projects, strategic planning for affordable housing, and neighborhood revitalizations.
