= Hillary Scholten =

American politician (born 1982)

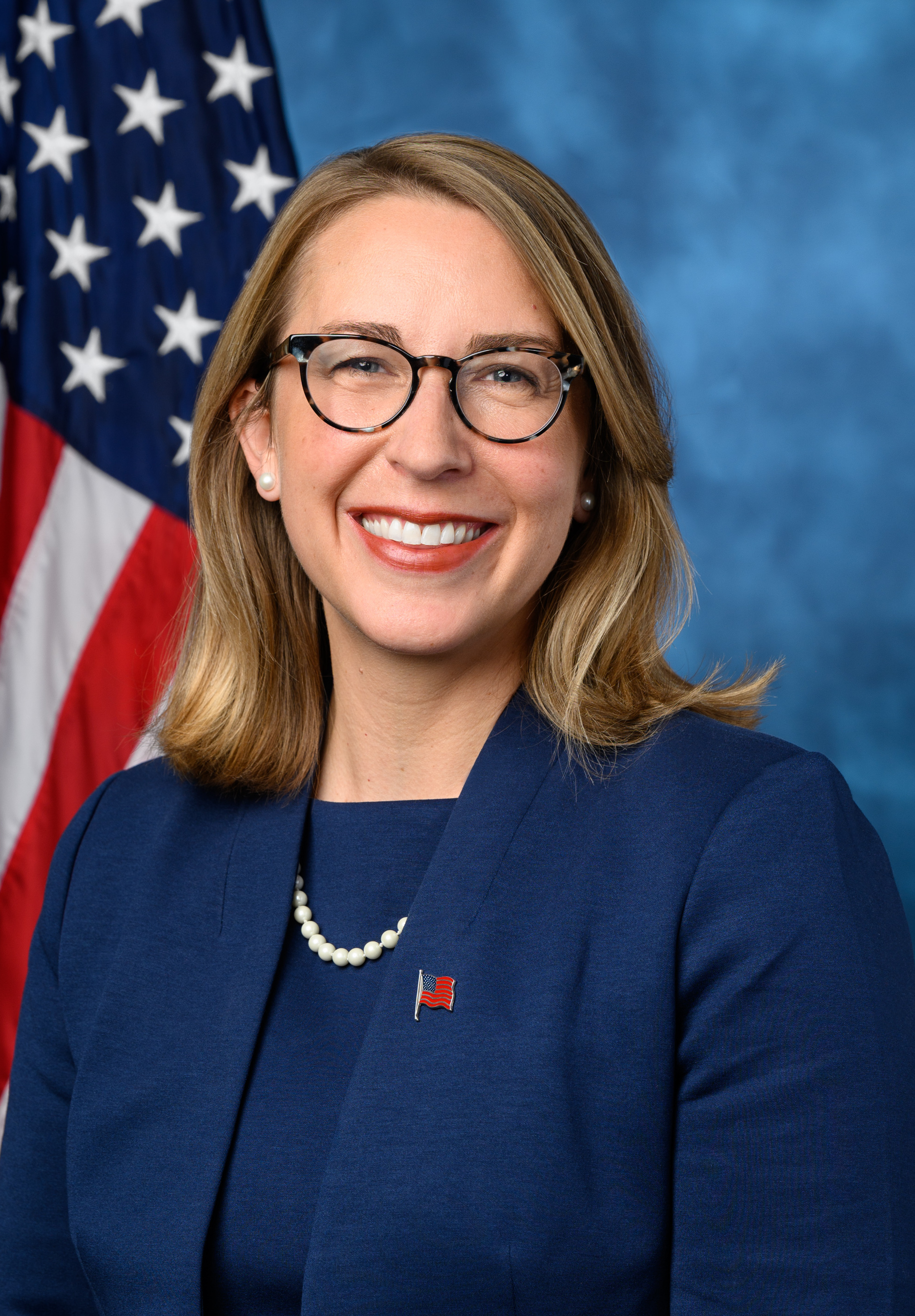
- Official portrait, 2023

Member of the U.S. House of Representatives from Michigan's 3rd district
- Incumbent
- Assumed office January 3, 2023
- Preceded by: Peter Meijer

Personal details
- Born: Hillary Jeanne Scholten; February 22, 1982 (age 44) Grand Rapids, Michigan, U.S.
- Party: Democratic
- Spouse: Jesse Holcomb (div. 2026)
- Children: 2
- Education: Gordon College (BA); University of Maryland, Baltimore (JD)
- Website: House website Campaign website

Hillary Jeanne Scholten (/ˈskoʊltən/ SKOHL-tən; born February 22, 1982) is an American politician and attorney who has served as the U.S. representative from Michigan's 3rd congressional district since 2023. She is a member of the Democratic Party. Her district, which was once represented by former President Gerald Ford, is based in Grand Rapids and includes much of the urban core of West Michigan. Before her election, Scholten worked as an attorney for the Department of Justice and in private practice.

Scholten is the first woman to represent the district, the first Democrat to represent Grand Rapids in Congress since Richard Vander Veen left office in 1977, and the second to represent the city since 1913.

== Early life and education ==
Scholten was born on February 22, 1982, in Grand Rapids. She grew up in Hudsonville southwest of Grand Rapids. Her mother worked as a public school teacher and her father was a sports journalist for The Grand Rapids Press. Her great-great-grandparents emigrated to West Michigan from the Netherlands; and she grew up in the Christian Reformed Church, a Calvinist denomination having its roots in the Dutch Reformed Church.

Hillary Scholten went to Unity Christian High School in Hudsonville and then attended Gordon College in Wenham, Massachusetts, where she earned a Bachelor of Arts degree in 2004. After college, she worked as a social worker, focusing on housing advocacy for the AIDS Action Committee. She later worked for Catholic Charities of the Archdiocese of Washington in immigration. She earn a Juris Doctor degree from the University of Maryland School of Law in Baltimore in 2011.

== Legal career ==
After law school, Scholten clerked for the U.S. Court of Appeals for the Second Circuit, specializing in immigration law. She later joined the U.S. Department of Justice as an attorney adviser for the Board of Immigration Appeals from 2013 to 2017, where she worked on federal immigration policy during the Obama administration. Afterwards, she returned to Michigan, became a staff attorney at the Michigan Immigrant Rights Center and later worked in private practice.

== U.S. House of Representatives ==
=== Elections ===
==== 2020 ====
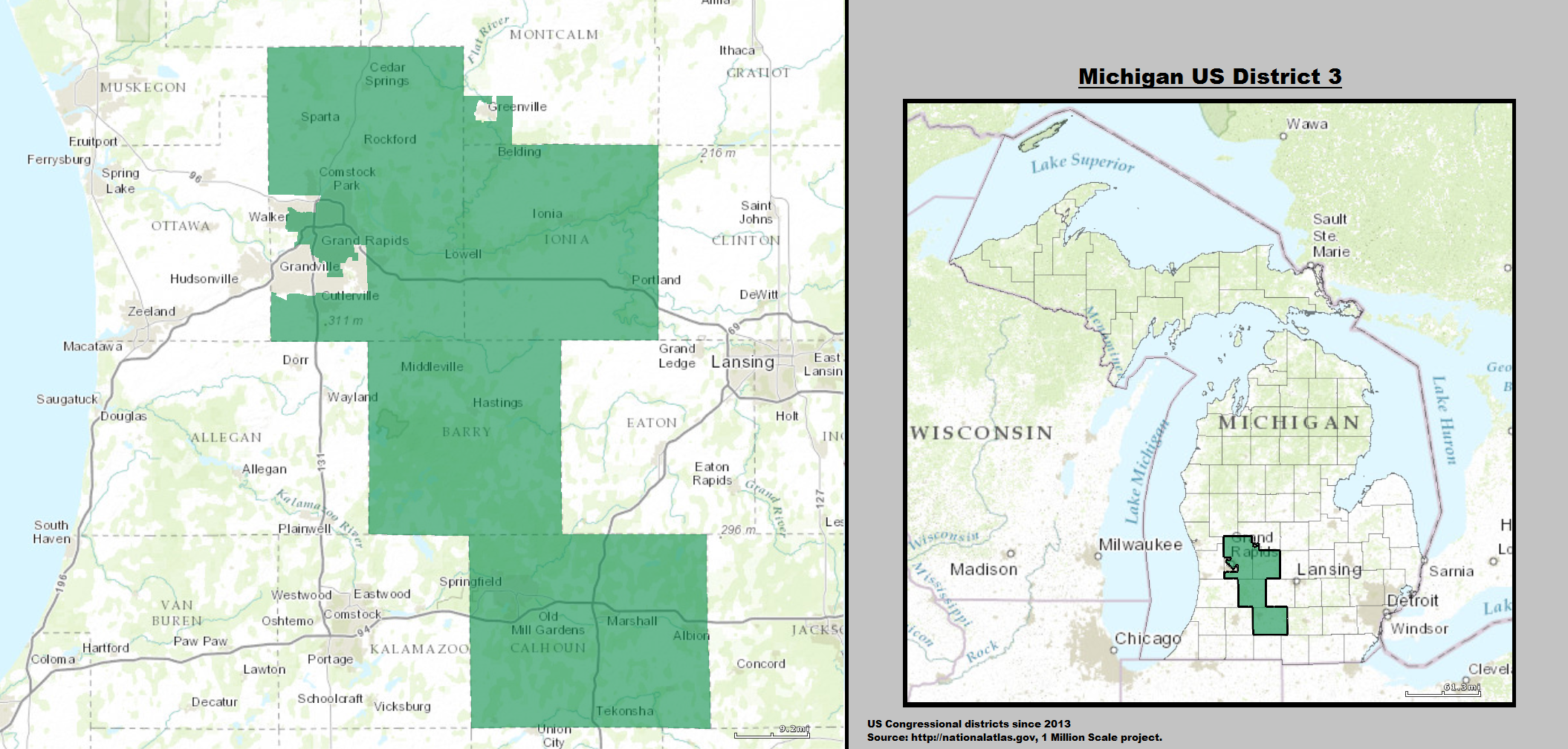
Michigan's 3rd congressional district up until 2023

In July 2019, Scholten announced her candidacy for the United States House of Representatives in Michigan's 3rd congressional district in the 2020 elections. She was unopposed in the Democratic Party primary. She lost the general election to Republican nominee Peter Meijer, winning 47% to Meijer's 53%. It was the closest a Democrat had come to winning the district since 1982, when incumbent Republican Harold S. Sawyer was held to 51% in what was then the 5th district (it has been the 3rd since 1993). She was also only the second Democrat since 1982 to win at least 40% of the vote in what had been one of the more Republican urban districts in the country; the Democratic nominee won 43% two years earlier.

==== 2022 ====
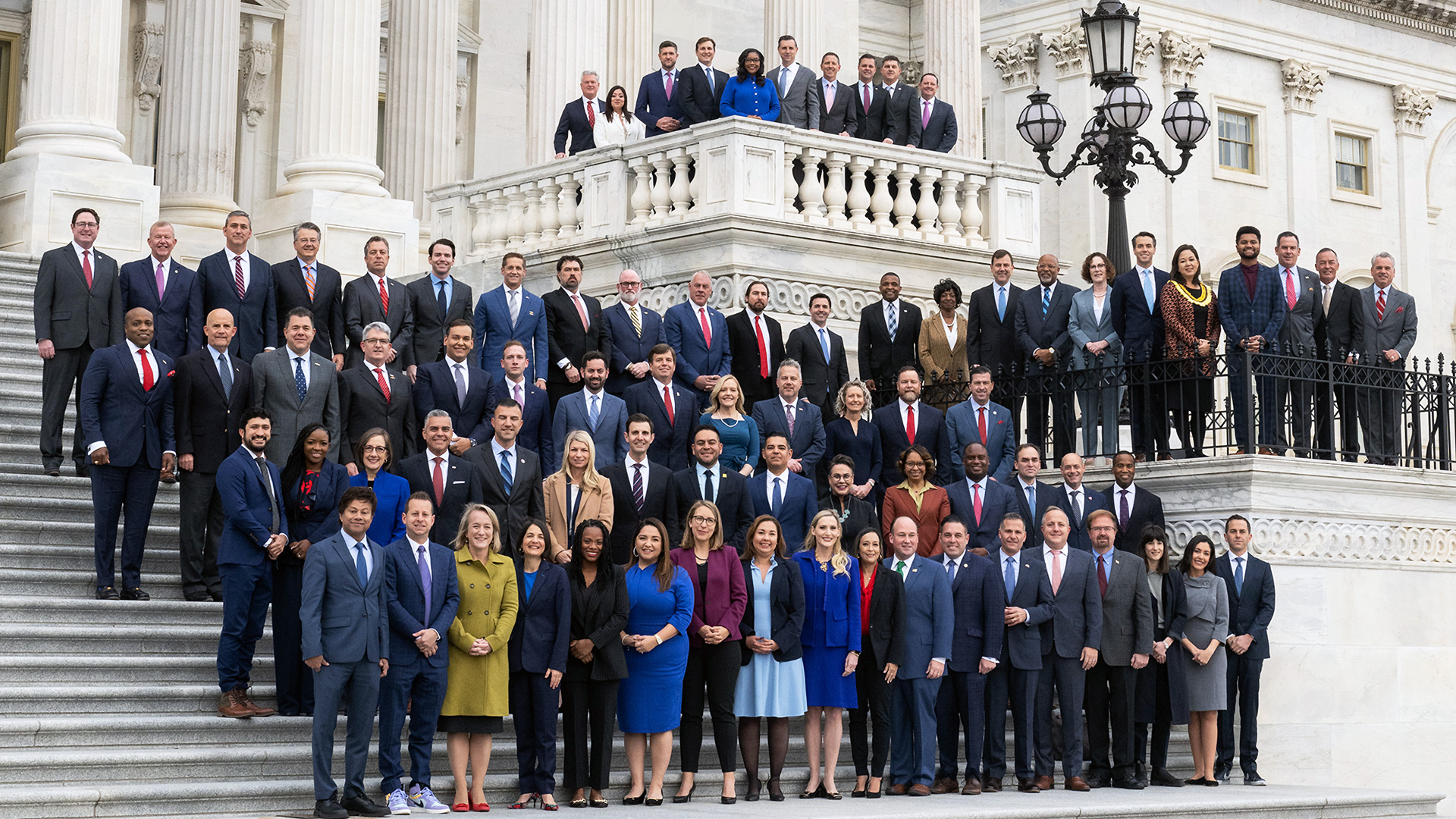
Scholten and the first time members of the 118th Congress, 2023

Scholten ran again in 2022 and was again unopposed in the Democratic primary. She was initially preparing for a rematch against Peter Meijer, but Meijer lost the Republican primary to a considerably more conservative challenger, former Trump administration official John Gibbs.

Scholten was running in a district which had been made much friendlier to Democrats in redistricting. The old 3rd had included some rural and exurban territory east of Grand Rapids, then extended south to reach Battle Creek. Redistricting pushed the district to the west to grab a large portion of the Lake Michigan shoreline including Muskegon and Grand Haven. Had the district had existed in 2020, Joe Biden would have won there with 53% of the vote; Donald Trump carried the old 3rd with 51%. Scholten defeated Gibbs 55% to 42% to win election to the 118th United States Congress.

When she took office on January 3, 2023, Scholten became only the second Democrat to represent what is now the 3rd since 1913. The seat had been in Republican hands for all but 35 months since then, the only break coming when Richard Vander Veen won a special election in 1974 for what was then the 5th district after 26-year incumbent Ford gave up the seat to accept an appointment as Vice President. Vander Veen won a full term later that year, but was defeated in 1976. Underscoring how Republican this region had historically been, Scholten was the first Democrat to represent Muskegon since 1933 and only the second since 1893, and the first Democrat to represent Grand Haven since 1913.

==== 2024 ====
Scholten ran again in 2024. She had token opposition in the Democratic primary, winning 91% of the vote. She went on to win the general election winning 53.7% of the vote against Republican challenger and former state Supreme Court candidate Paul Hudson, becoming the first Democrat to win two full terms in the district in 112 years.

==== 2026 ====
Scholten is running for reelection in 2026.

=== Tenure ===
Scholten was sworn into office on January 7, 2023. She joined in the calls in 2024 for Joe Biden to step aside as the Democratic presidential nominee, becoming the first in Michigan's congressional delegation to do so, leading to retaliation from Biden allies. During Donald Trump's address to Congress on March 4, 2025, Scholten wore pink, together with many other members of the Democratic Women's Caucus, as a protest.

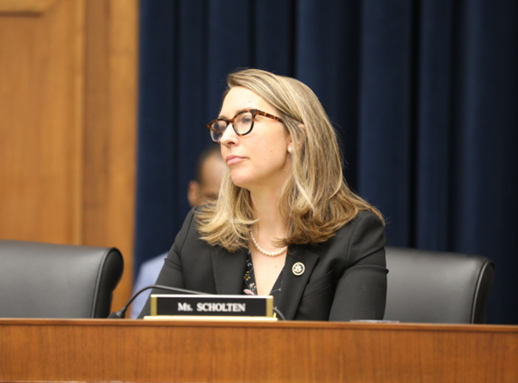
Scholten on the Committee on Transportation and Infrastructure

In the 119th Congress, Scholten is part of:

- Committee on Small Business
  - Subcommittee on Contracting and Infrastructure
  - Subcommittee on Innovation, Entrepreneurship, and Workforce Development (ranking member)
  - Subcommittee on Rural Development, Energy, and Supply Chain
- Committee on Transportation and Infrastructure
  - Subcommittee on Aviation
  - Subcommittee on Coast Guard and Maritime Transportation
  - Subcommittee on Water Resources and Environment

=== Caucus memberships ===
- Black Maternal Health Caucus
- Congressional Equality Caucus
- New Democrat Coalition
- Problem Solvers Caucus
- Future Forum
- Democratic Women's Caucus (vice-chair)
- Child Labor Prevention Task Force (co-chair)
- Franchise Caucus (co-chair)

== Political positions ==
Scholten supports abortion rights and quoted Jeremiah 1:5 in a House Floor speech, which received backlash from many Christians. In 2025, she was one of 46 House Democrats who joined Republicans to vote for the Laken Riley Act. In July 2025, Scholten placed blame entirely on Hamas for the humanitarian crisis in the Gaza Strip, "Hamas started this war and can end it today. But they choose not to."

During the 2026 United States Senate election in Michigan, Scholten was criticized for remarks widely considered to be Islamophobic, repeating unsupported claims of sexism and extreme rhetoric by Democratic nominee Abdul El-Sayed and criticizing his associations with related and unrelated progressive figures. These attacks continued, resulting in questions at a town hall to ask whether Scholten's rhetoric was encouraging hate speech and aimed at maintaining taxpayer support for Israel rather than sincere concerns.

In October 2026, Scholten asserted that an envelope containing unidentified white powder was sent to her congressional office, and that a letter within it purported to be from the Democratic Socialists of America. Scholten called on the DSA to condemn the mailing and stated they should "take or deny responsibility" for the incident, and accused the organization of "[allowing] extremists in its movement who not only allow but justify violence as a viable means to achieve political ends." The DSA indicated the listed return address had not been occupied by their organization for more than a decade prior, and that "Needless to say, we are not involved with these letters".

== Personal life ==
Scholten was married to Jesse Holcomb, a journalism professor at Calvin University in Grand Rapids. Holcomb filed for divorce from Scholten in January 2026 after 20 years of marriage. They have two sons. She is a member of the Christian Reformed Church.

== Electoral history ==
Michigan's 3rd congressional district, 2020
Party	Candidate	Votes	%
Republican	Peter Meijer	213,649	52.96%
Democratic	Hillary Scholten	189,769	47.04%
Total votes		403,418	100.0
Republican gain from Libertarian			

Michigan's 3rd congressional district, 2022
Party	Candidate	Votes	%
Democratic	Hillary Scholten	185,989	54.87%
Republican	John Gibbs	142,229	41.96%
Libertarian	Jamie Lewis	6,634	1.96%
Working Class	Louis Palus	4,136	1.22%
Total votes		338,988	100.0
Democratic gain from Republican			

Michigan's 3rd congressional district, 2024
Party	Candidate	Votes	%
Democratic	Hillary Scholten (incumbent)	225,510	53.66%
Republican	Paul Hudson	183,952	43.77%
Libertarian	Alex Avery	5,281	1.26%
Working Class	Louis Palus	5,546	1.32%
Total votes		420,289	100.0
Democratic hold			

U.S. House of Representatives
Preceded by Peter Meijer	Member of the U.S. House of Representatives from Michigan's 3rd congressional district 2023–present	Incumbent
U.S. order of precedence (ceremonial)
Preceded by Andrea Salinas	United States representatives by seniority 346th	Succeeded by Keith Self
