= Michael Bright =

American politician and businessman

Michael Bright served as interim president of Ginnie Mae from July 2017 to January 2019 and is CEO of the Structured Finance Association (SFA), the securitization industry's largest trade association. President Donald Trump nominated Bright to serve as Ginnie Mae's permanent president in May 2018 but the nomination was never confirmed despite being voted out of the Committee on Banking, Housing, and Urban Affairs by a unanimous voice vote.

== Education ==
Bright has a B.A. in International Relations from Johns Hopkins University and an M.A. in International Relations from its School of Advanced International Studies.

== Career ==
Bright began his career in 2002 at Countrywide Financial in Calabasas, Ca. as a modeler and trader. Later, he worked for Wachovia Bank as a trader in interest rate derivatives.

Entering government service, from 2009 to 2010, he was a mortgage data analyst in the Office of the Comptroller of the Currency. In 2013, while working for Senator Bob Corker he was a principal author of the Corker-Warner bill for housing finance reform.

Returning to the private sector, he joined BlackRock as vice president in the financial advisory unit. He left after a year to join PennyMac, as senior vice president of business development.

Bright then joined the housing program at the Milken Institute Center for Financial Markets. In September 2016, he and former director of the Federal Housing Finance Agency Ed DeMarco were co-authors of a paper "Toward a New Secondary Mortgage Market." It called for an end to the conservatorship of Fannie Mae and Freddie Mac, to create a private market for mortgage credit risk, and to remove Ginnie Mae from the Department of Housing and Urban Development, converting it into an independent government agency.

Bright joined Ginnie Mae in July 2017 as executive vice president and chief operating officer. He served as its interim president from July 2017 until May 2018, after its previous president Ted Tozer left at the beginning of the Trump administration in January 2017.

As COO, he managed all operations for Ginnie Mae’s $2 trillion portfolio of mortgage-backed securities (MBS) and oversaw the fulfillment of the agency’s core mission.

In November 2017, he testified during a House Financial Services Committee hearing on "Sustainable Housing Finance: The Role of Ginnie Mae in the Housing Finance System."

On May 15, 2018, the Trump administration announced it had nominated Bright as president of Ginnie Mae. He resigned on January 9, 2019, effective January 16. A week later, he became CEO at the Structured Finance Association.
