= Office of Community Planning and Development =

- Seal of the U.S. Department of Housing and Urban Development

Office overview
- Jurisdiction: United States
- Headquarters: Robert C. Weaver Federal Building; Washington, D.C.
- Office executives: Vacant, Assistant Secretary for Community Planning and Development; David C. Woll Jr., Principal Deputy Assistant Secretary for Community Planning and Development
- Parent department: Department of Housing and Urban Development
- Key document: Code of Federal Regulations 24 CFR Chapter V
- Website: www.hud.gov/program_offices/comm_planning/

The Office of Community Planning and Development is an agency within the United States Department of Housing and Urban Development (HUD). The office administers the grant programs that help communities plan and finance their growth and development, increase their capacity to govern, and provide shelter and services for homeless people. HUD is a national program, and HUD provides funding directly to larger cities and counties, and for smaller cities and counties, generally to state government. HUD's programs include the Community Development Block Grant Program and the HOME program.

One of the office's main functions is dispersing the Community Development Block Grant (CDBG) as it does not directly provide full-fledged services, but instead aims to build partnerships with the public sector with the private sector, regardless if they are non-profit or not.

Other grant focuses are on Indian Tribes, self-help for those who wish to own their homes, people who live in rural areas, and youth.

== Structure ==
The agency is headed by an Assistant Secretary, who oversees the following:

- Assistant Secretary of Housing and Urban Development for Community Planning and Development
  - Principal Assistant Secretary of Housing and Urban Development for Community Planning and Development
    - Deputy Assistant Secretary for Operations
    - Deputy Assistant Secretary for Economic Development
    - Deputy Assistant Secretary for Special Needs
    - Deputy Assistant Secretary for Grant Programs
    - Director, Office of Field Management
    - Director, Office of Policy Development and Coordination
    - Director, Office of Technical Assistance and Management
    - Director, Office of Rural Housing and Economic Development
    - Director, Office of HIV/AIDS Housing
    - Director, Office of Special Needs Assistance Programs
    - Director, Office of Affordable Housing Programs
    - Director, Office of Block Grant Assistance
    - Director, Office of Environment and Energy

The Office of Grant Programs oversees affordable housing and community development programs, including the Community Development Block Grant Program (CDBG), the HOME Investment Partnerships program, the Housing Trust Fund, and CDBG Disaster Recovery funds, in addition to Department-wide energy and environmental policy.

The Office of Economic Development creates Promise Zones that are meant to revamp impoverished areas by attracting private investment and increasing affordable housing.

The Office for Special Needs, works to administer the homeless assistance programs HUD runs

The Office of Field Operations is meant to support Multifamily Headquarters, Regional Offices and their stakeholders.

== Criticism ==
The office has been critiqued for providing more of their grant funding to the districts of the elected officials who oversee HUD's programs And in 1994 the office purchased software meant to view communities and their unemployment rates and income, which has been seen as an indirect way to also map crime, which would influence on what areas would receive funds.

== Appropriations ==
For Fiscal Year 2015 the office's appropriations Budget was $6.4 billion dollars, with nearly half of that intended to be used for the Community Development Block Grant, which has consistently been the focus of critics against wasteful spending.

Homeless Assistance Grants is their second largest program with $2.1 billion dollars planned for providing Homeless Assistance, often for those who have suddenly lost their home after an emergency. The Continuum of Care Grant they disperse has been noted as being very selective and successful with granting funds to those that “effectively discharge homeless people” to permanent housing and services needed to live independently.

In early 2017, President Donald Trump proposed eliminating the CBDG as it is "not well-targeted to the poorest populations" along with the HOME grants as "State and local governments are better positioned to serve their communities based on local needs and priorities."

== See also ==
- Title 24 of the Code of Federal Regulations
