= List of Democrats who opposed the Joe Biden 2024 presidential campaign =

In the lead-up to the 2024 United States presidential election, there was doubt about Joe Biden's ability to run for re-election. Before announcing his reelection campaign, he was facing historically low approval ratings, and several polls showed a majority of Democratic voters did not want him to run.

On April 25, 2023, Biden announced his 2024 candidacy to mixed reactions, though most Democratic voters said they would support his campaign. In October, dissent from other Democrats grew following his response to the October 7 attacks and the subsequent United States support for Israel in the Gaza war.

As the 2024 Democratic primaries began, Muslim leaders and anti-war activists led Gaza war protest vote movements, urging Democrats to write-in or vote uncommitted. On March 12, Biden secured enough delegates to become the presumptive nominee of the Democratic Party, despite primary challenges from U.S. Representative Dean Phillips and activist Marianne Williamson. Biden ultimately finished the primary season holding nearly all of the delegates.

After his poorly received performance in the first presidential debate on June 27, there was speculation that Biden might end his campaign. Concerns about Biden's age existed before the debate, but they increased after the debate. With less than two months before the Democratic National Convention, elected officials, donors, and celebrities began to call for Biden to drop out of the race. On July 21, Biden announced that he would no longer be seeking re-election.

== Federal executive officials ==
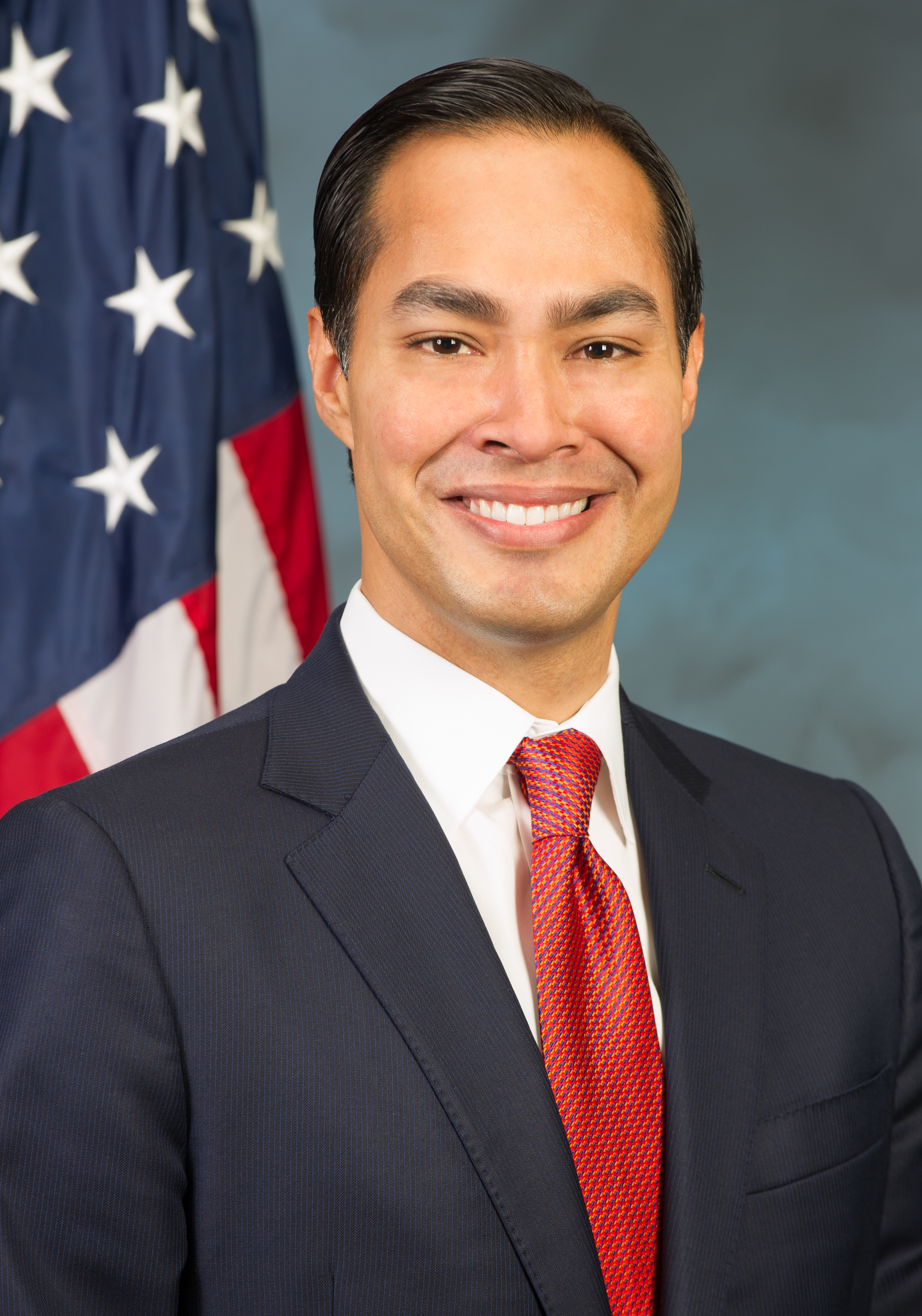
Julian Castro

Political activity by executive branch officials (other than the president and vice president) face some restrictions under the Hatch Act.

=== Former Cabinet-level officials ===
- Julian Castro, Secretary of Housing and Urban Development (2014–2017), Mayor of San Antonio (2009–2014) and 2020 presidential candidate (called on Biden to drop out)

=== Former executive branch officials ===
- David Axelrod, former Senior Advisor to the President (2009–2011)
- Jon Favreau, White House Director of Speechwriting (2009–2013)
- Paul McHale, Assistant Secretary of Defense for Homeland Security (2003–2009) and U.S. Representative from PA-15 (1993–1999) (called on Biden to drop out)
- Daniel Pfeiffer, Senior Advisor to the President (2013–2015), White House Communications Director (2009–2013)
- Hala Rharrit, the Arabic-language spokesperson of the US State Department (2006–2024)
- Tommy Vietor, Special Assistant to the President (2011–2013)

== U.S. senators ==
=== Current ===
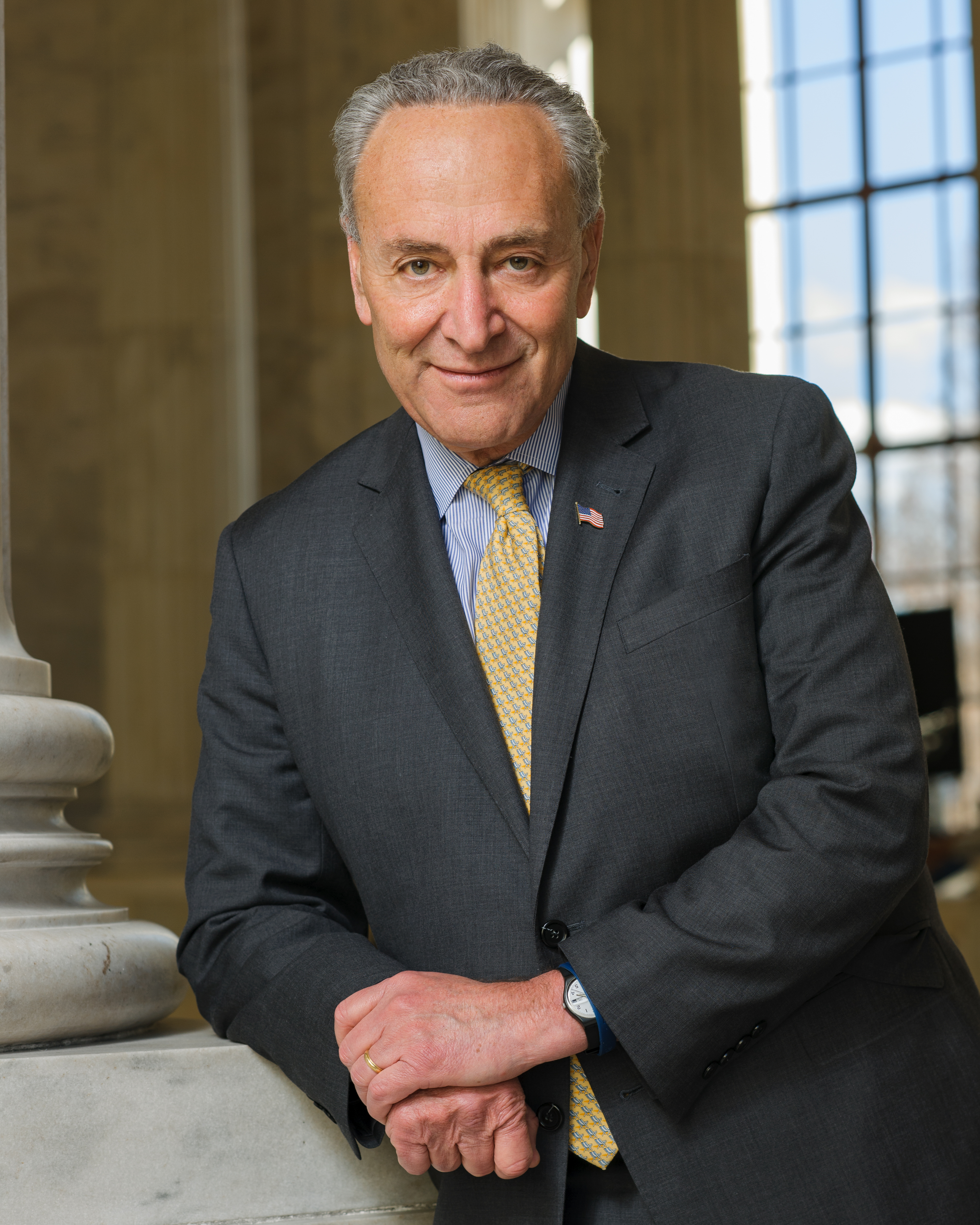
Chuck Schumer

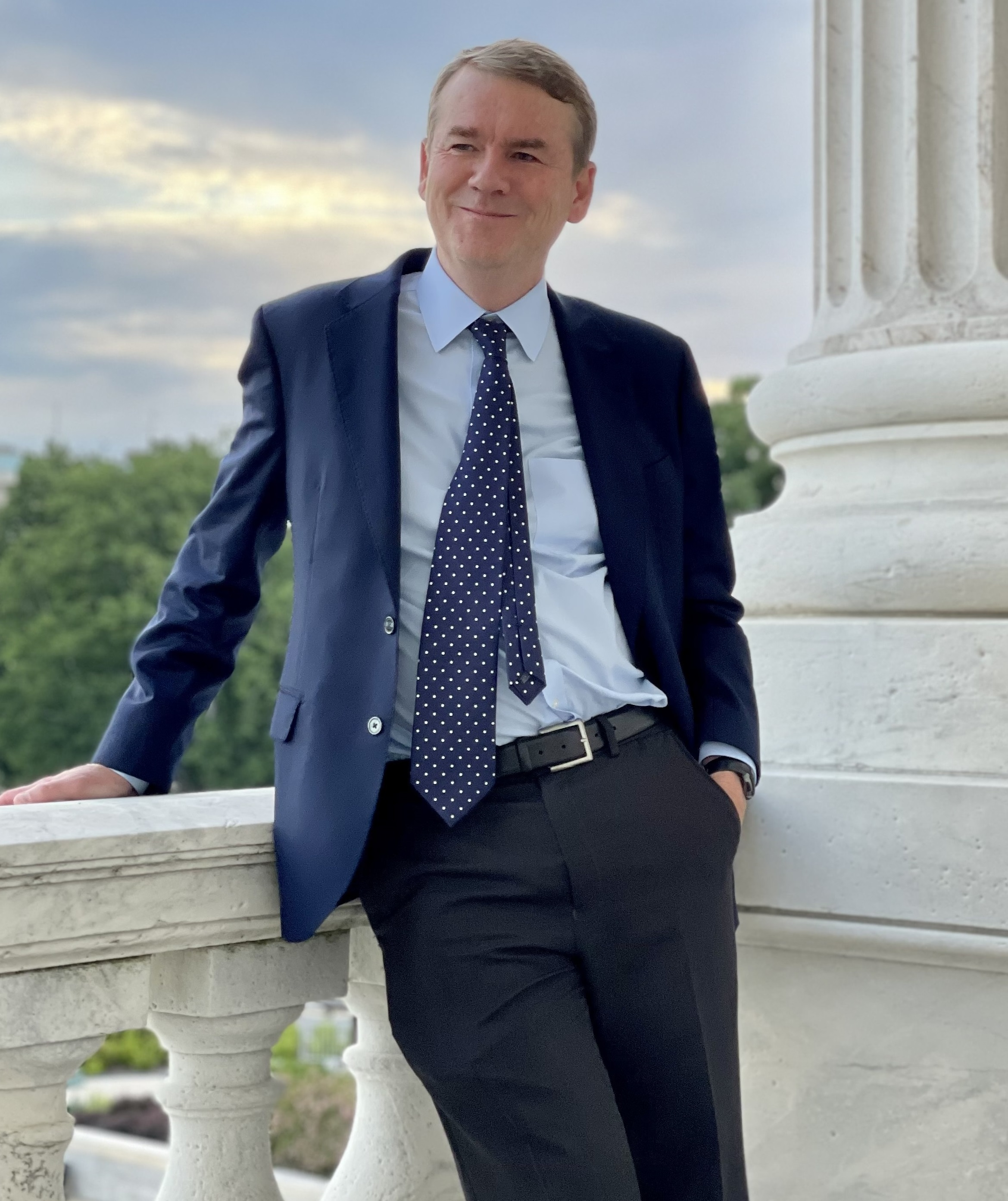
Michael Bennet

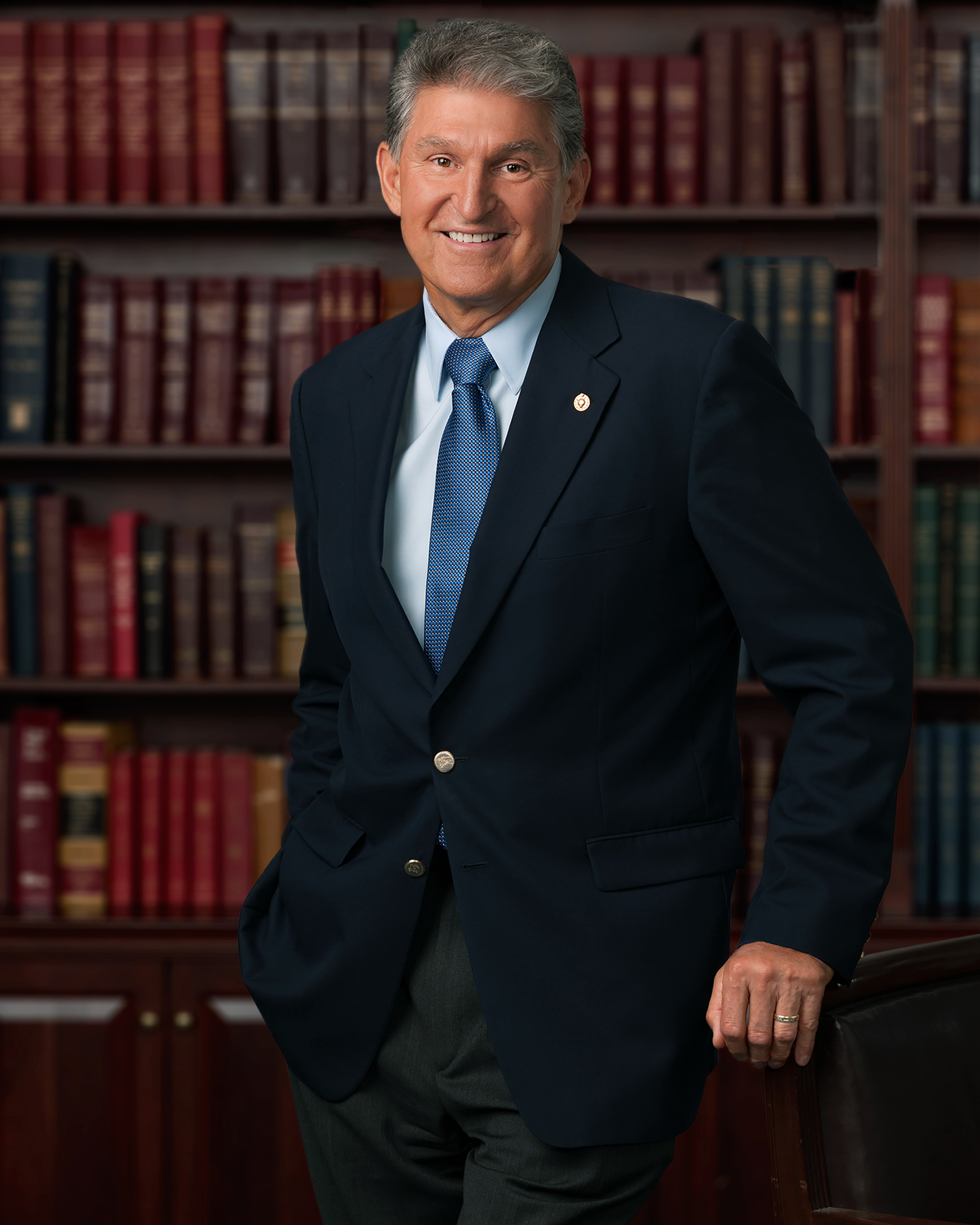
Joe Manchin

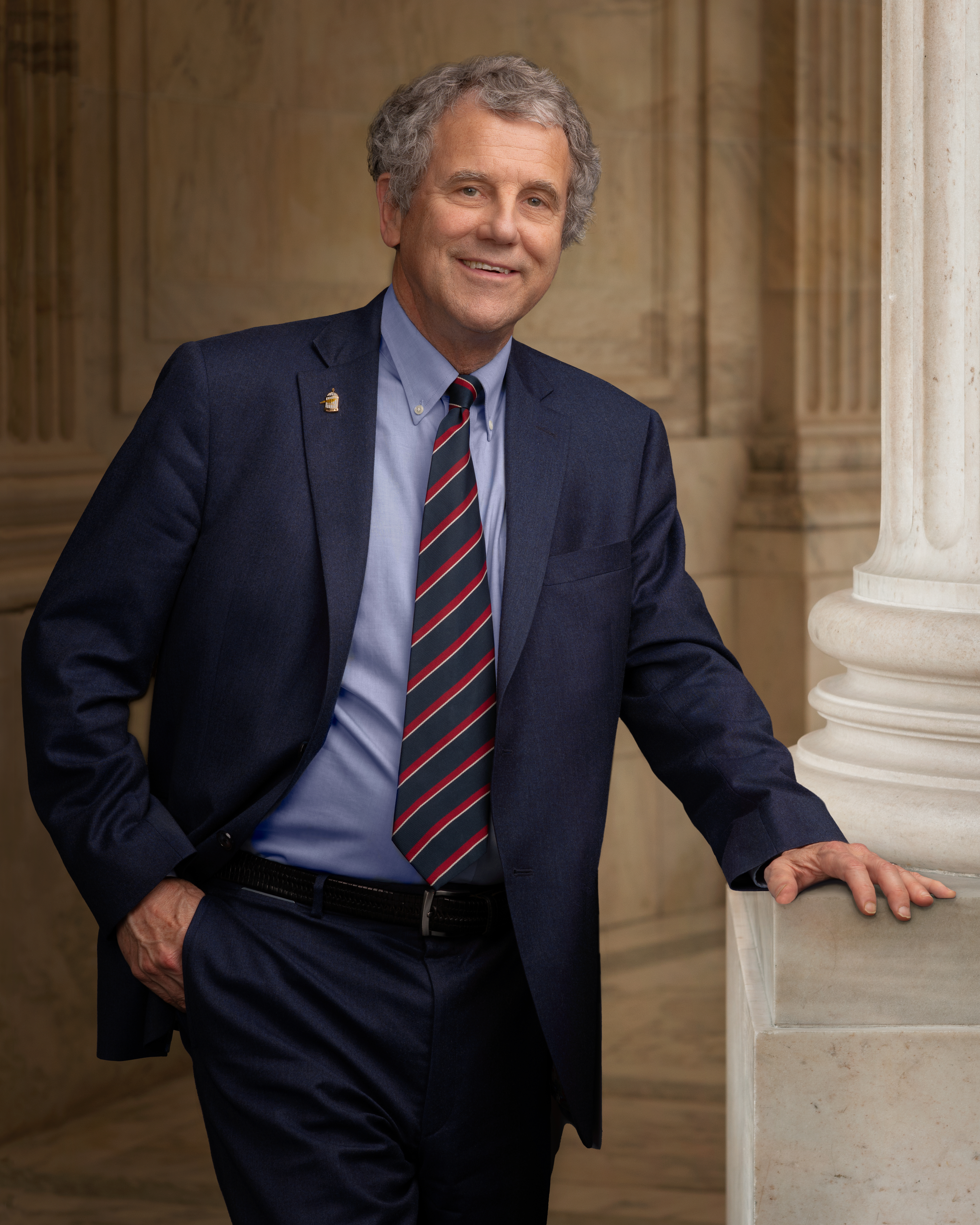
Sherrod Brown

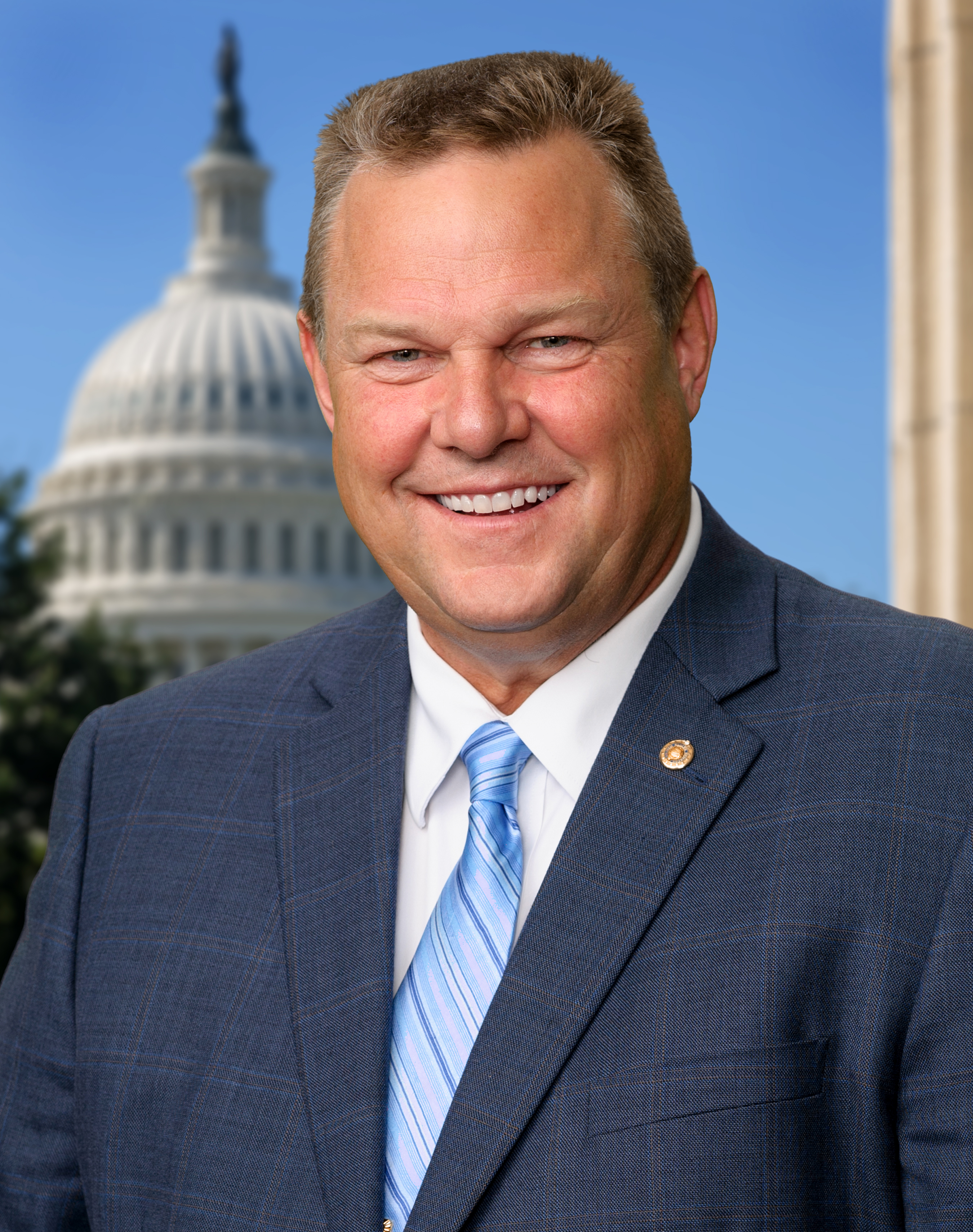
Jon Tester

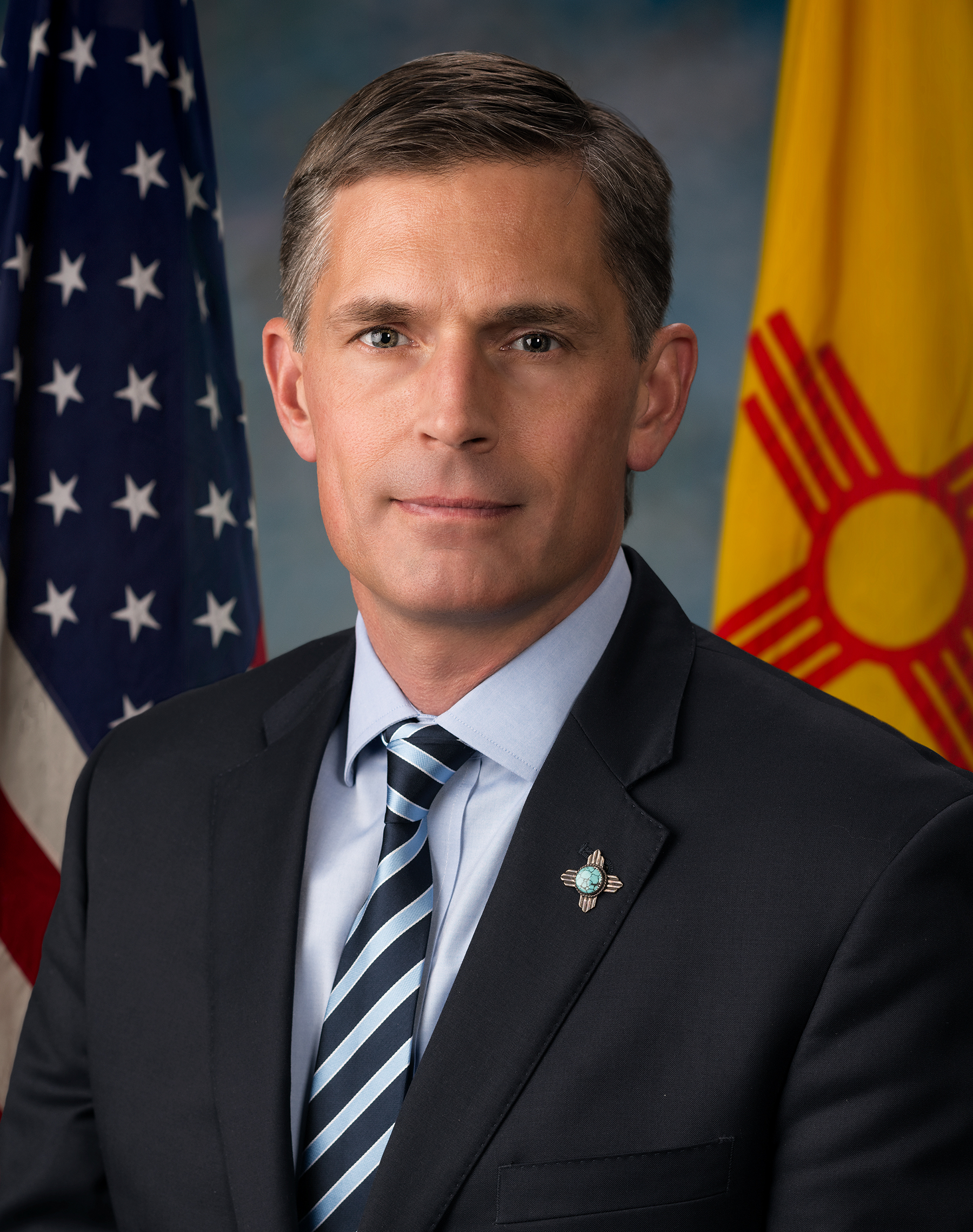
Martin Heinrich

Of the 47 current Democratic U.S. senators and 4 independent U.S. senators that caucused with the Democrats in 2024, 6 Democrats and 1 independent opposed Biden continuing his reelection campaign:

- Peter Welch, Vermont (2023–present), U.S. Representative from VT-AL (2007–2023) (called on Biden to drop out)
- Michael Bennet, Colorado (2009–present) (called on Biden to drop out)
- Sherrod Brown, Ohio (2007–2025), U.S. Representative from OH-13 (1993–2007) (called on Biden to drop out)
- Martin Heinrich, New Mexico (2013–present), U.S. Representative from NM-1 (2009–2013) (called on Biden to drop out)
- Joe Manchin, West Virginia (2010–2025), Governor of West Virginia (2005–2010), Secretary of State of West Virginia (2001–2005) (called on Biden to drop out)
- Chuck Schumer, New York (1999–present), Senate Majority Leader (2021–2025), Senate Minority Leader (2017–2021), U.S. Representative from NY-16 (1981–1983), NY-10 (1983– 1993), NY-9 (1993–1999) (privately told Biden to drop out)
- Jon Tester, Montana (2007–2025) (called on Biden to drop out)

=== Former ===
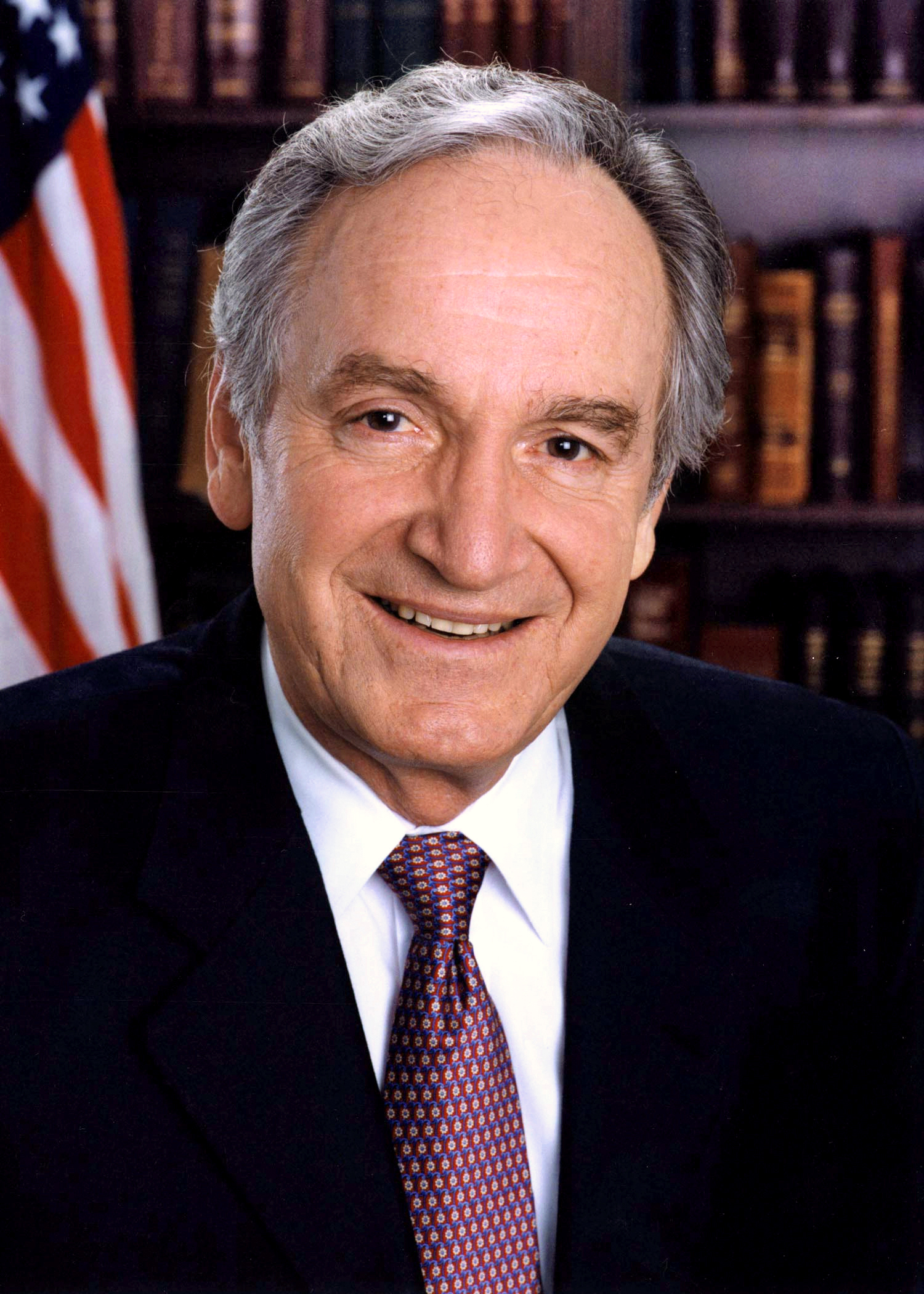
Tom Harkin

- Tom Harkin, Iowa (1985–2015), U.S. Representative from IA-05 (1975–1985), and candidate in the 1992 Democratic presidential primaries (called on Biden to drop out)
- Tim Wirth, Colorado (1987–1993), U.S. Representative from CO-02 (1975–1987) (called on Biden to drop out)

== U.S. representatives ==
=== Current ===
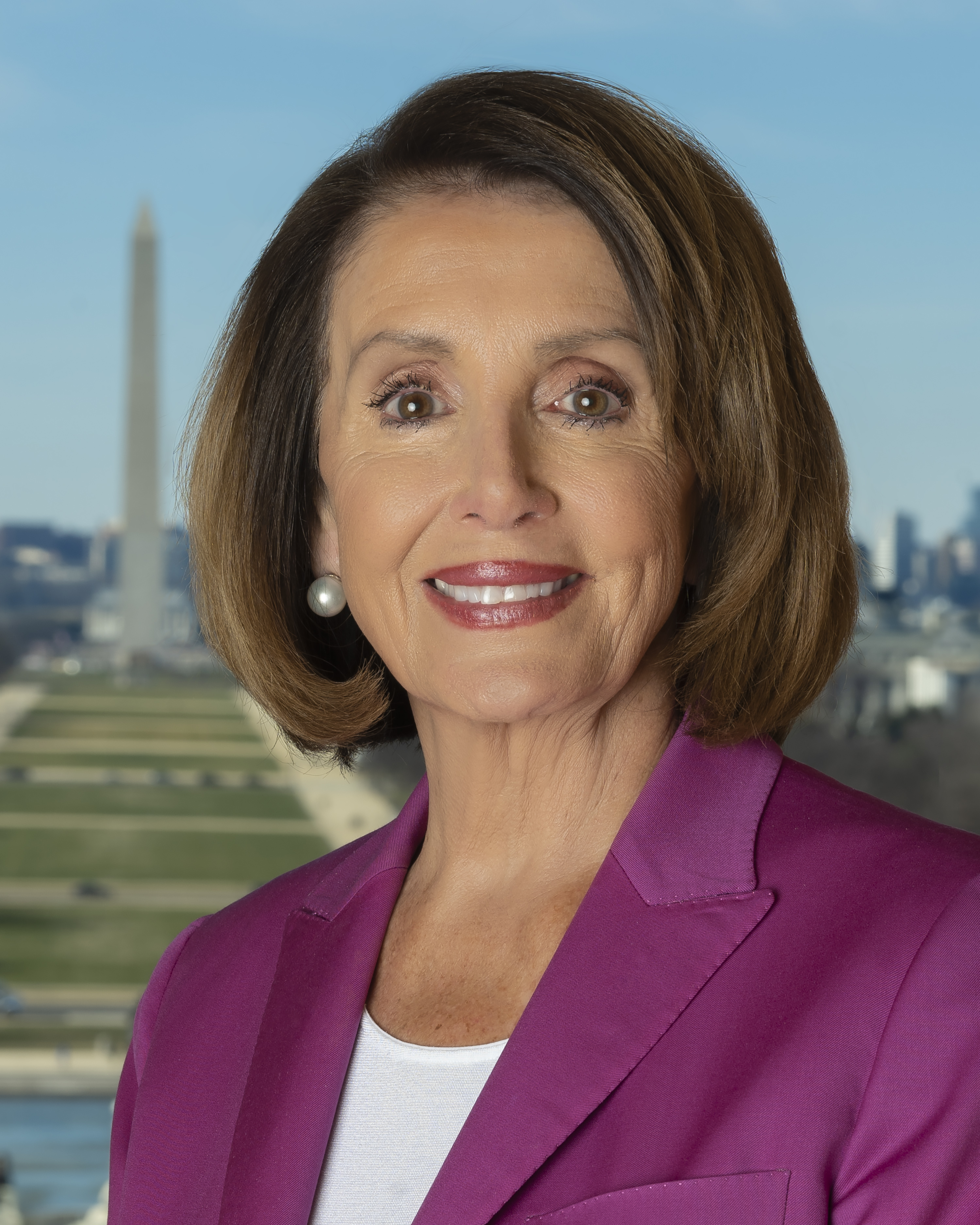
Nancy Pelosi

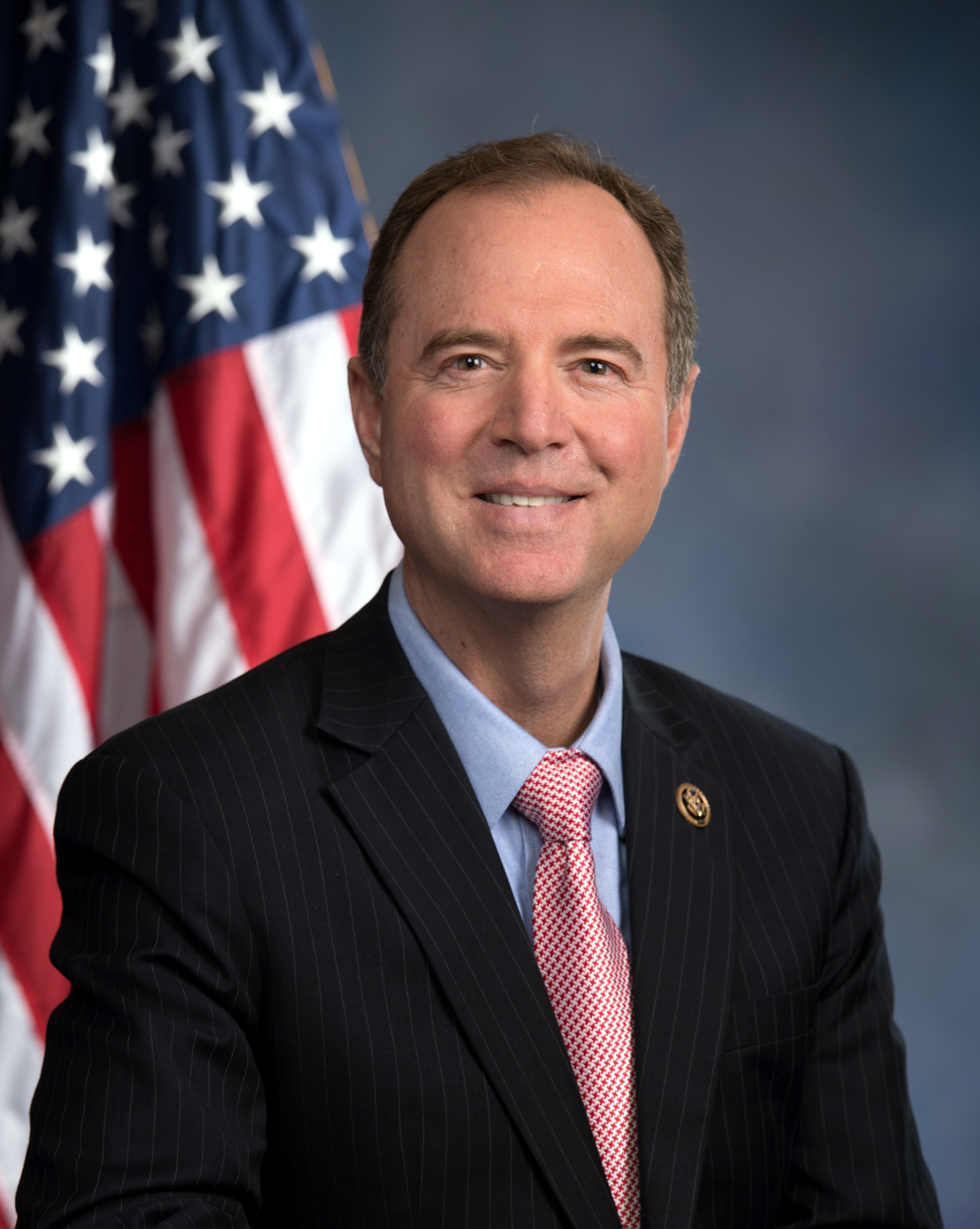
Adam Schiff

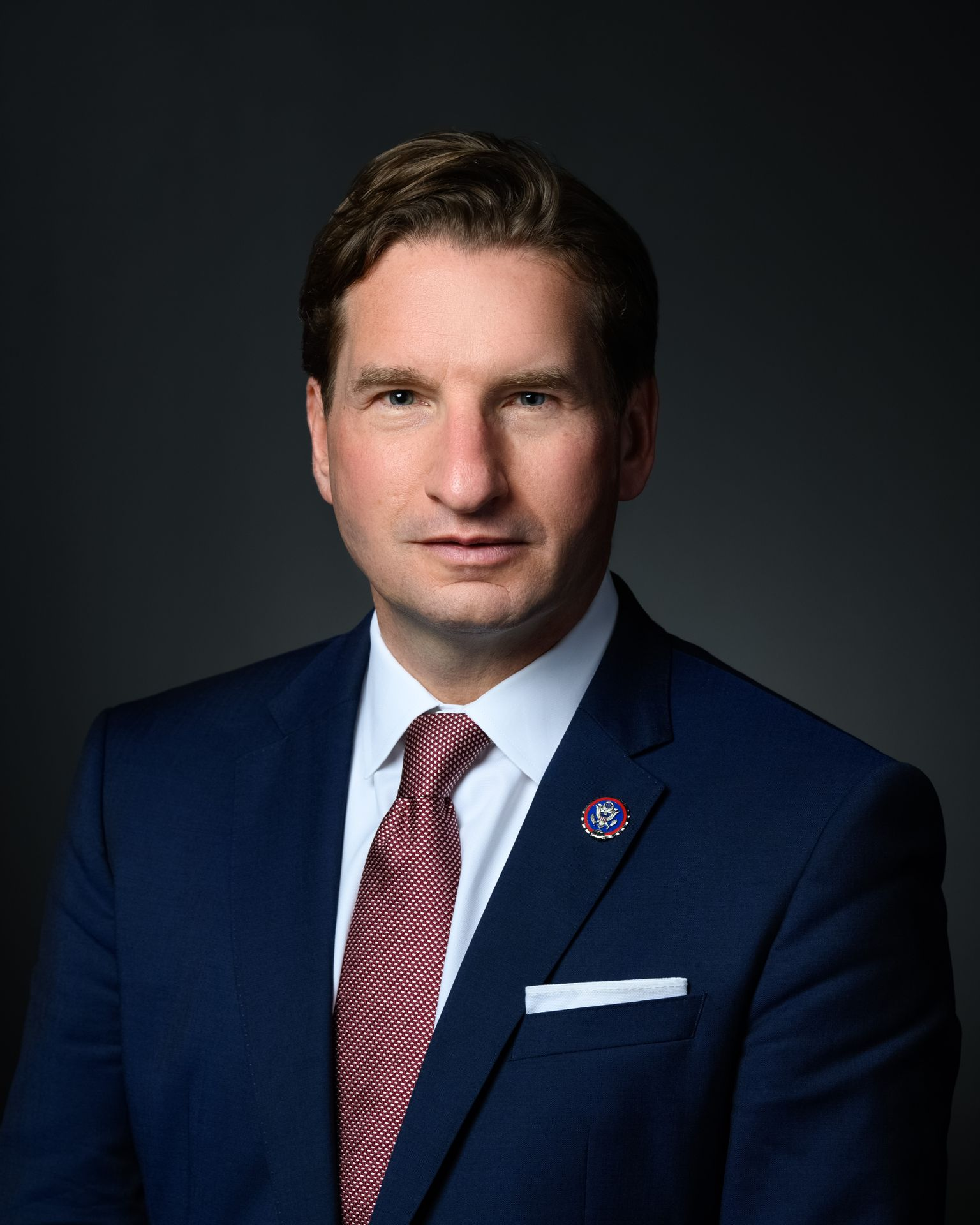
Dean Phillips

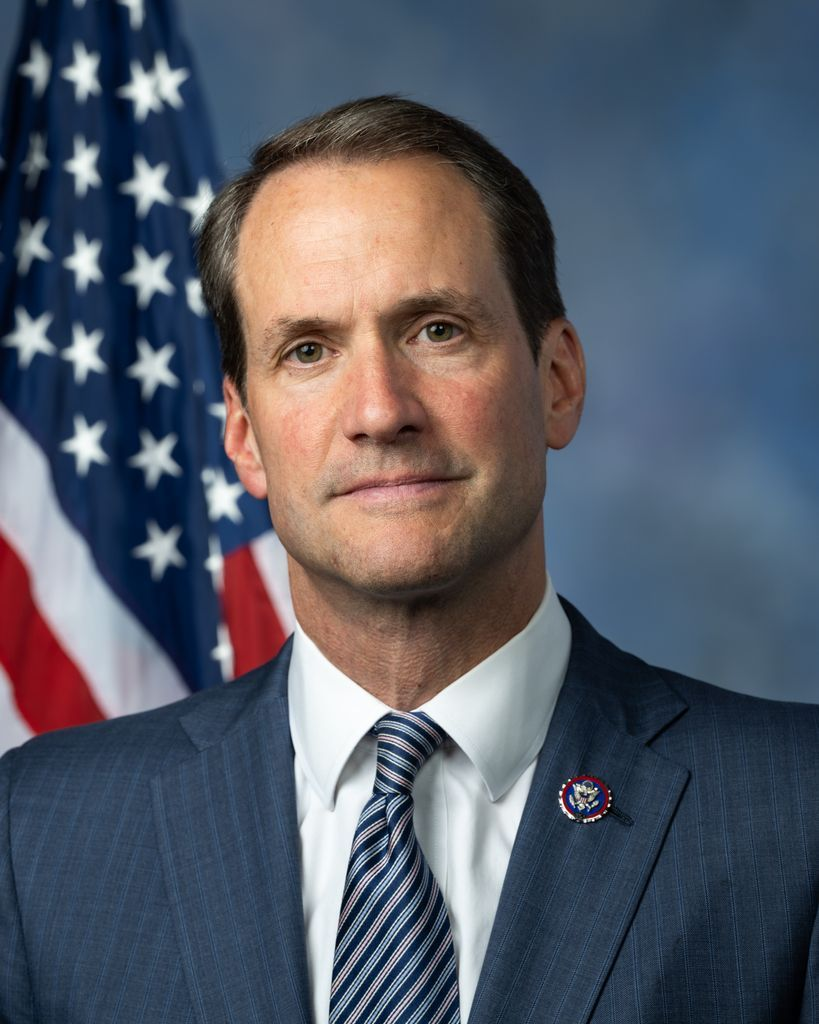
Jim Himes

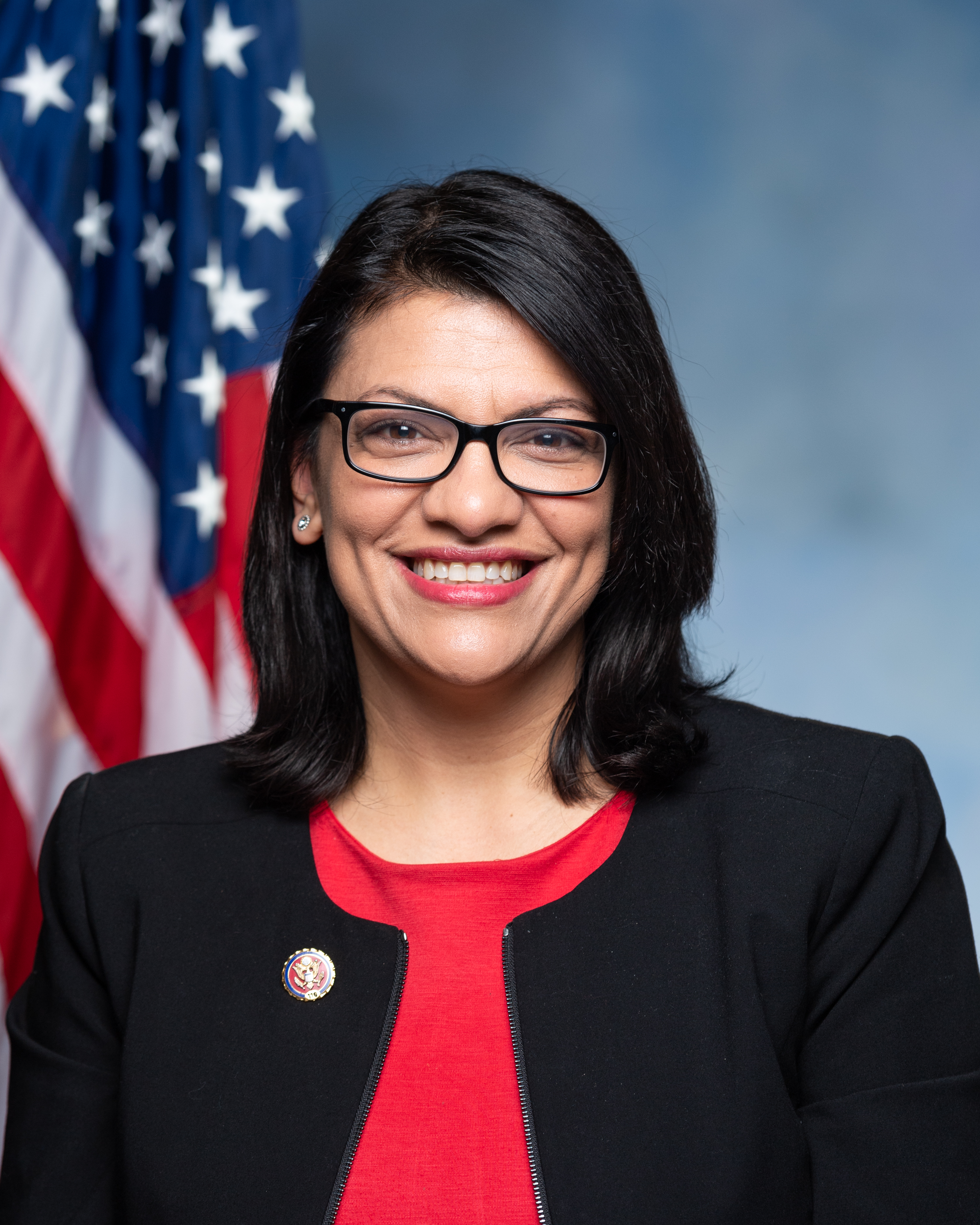
Rashida Tlaib

Of the 212 Democratic members of the House of Representatives in 2024, 40 opposed Biden's campaign:

- Earl Blumenauer, OR-03 (1996–2025) (called on Biden to drop out)
- Ed Case, HI-01 (2019–present), HI-02 (2002–2007) (called on Biden to drop out)
- Kathy Castor, FL-14 (2013–present), FL-11 (2007–2013) (called on Biden to drop out)
- Jim Costa, CA-21 (2023–present), CA-16 (2013–2023), CA-20 (2005–2013) (called on Biden to drop out)
- Sean Casten, IL-06 (2019–present) (called on Biden to drop out)
- Angie Craig, MN-02 (2019–present) (called on Biden to drop out)
- Lloyd Doggett, TX-37 (2023–present), TX-35 (2013–2023), TX-25 (2005–2013), TX-10 (1995–2005) (called on Biden to drop out)
- Chuy Garcia, IL-04 (2019–present) (called on Biden to drop out)
- Marie Gluesenkamp Perez, WA-03 (2023–present) (called for Biden to resign)
- Jared Golden, ME-02 (2019–present) (would not commit to voting for Biden)
- Raúl Grijalva, AZ-07 (2023–present), AZ-03 (2013–2023), and AZ-07 (2003–2013) (called on Biden to drop out)
- Jim Himes, CT-04 (2009–present) and Ranking Member on the House Intelligence Committee (called on Biden to drop out)
- Jared Huffman, CA-02 (2013–present) (called on Biden to drop out)
- Greg Landsman, OH-01 (2023–present) (called on Biden to drop out)
- Mike Levin, CA-49 (2019–present) (called on Biden to drop out)
- Zoe Lofgren, CA-18 (1995–present) (called on Biden to drop out)
- Betty McCollum, MN-04 (2001–present) (called on Biden to drop out)
- Morgan McGarvey, KY-3 (2023–present) (called on Biden to drop out)
- Joe Morelle, NY-25 (2018–present) (called on Biden to drop out)
- Seth Moulton, MA-06 (2015–present) (called on Biden to drop out)
- Nancy Pelosi, CA-11 (2023–present), CA-12 (2013–2023), CA-8 (1993–2013), CA-5 (1987–1993), Speaker of the House of Representatives (2007–2011, 2019–2023), House Minority Leader (2003–2007, 2011–2019) (led internal efforts pressuring Biden to drop out)
- Scott Peters, CA-50 (2023–present), CA-52 (2013–2023) (called on Biden to drop out)
- Brittany Pettersen, CO-07 (2023–present) (called on Biden to drop out)
- Dean Phillips, MN-03 (2019–present) (ran against Biden in primary; later endorsed him)
- Mark Pocan, WI-02, (2013–present) (called on Biden to drop out)
- Mike Quigley, IL-05 (2009–present) (called on Biden to drop out)
- Jamie Raskin, MD-08 (2017–present) (called on Biden to drop out)
- Pat Ryan, NY-18 (2023–present), NY-19 (2022–2023) (called on Biden to drop out)
- Adam Schiff, CA-30 (2023–present), CA-28 (2013–2023), CA-29 (2003–2013), CA-27 (2001–2003), Democratic nominee for the United States Senate election in California (called on Biden to drop out)
- Brad Schneider, IL-10 (2017–present, 2013–2015) (called on Biden to drop out)
- Hillary Scholten, MI-03 (2023–present) (called on Biden to drop out)
- Mikie Sherrill, NJ-11 (2019–present) (called on Biden to drop out)
- Adam Smith, WA-09 (1997–present) (called on Biden to drop out)
- Eric Sorensen, IL-17 (2023–present) (called on Biden to drop out)
- Greg Stanton, AZ-04 (2023–present), AZ-09 (2019–2023) (called on Biden to drop out)
- Mark Takano, CA-39 (2023–present), CA-49 (2013–2023) (called on Biden to drop out)
- Rashida Tlaib, MI-12 (2023–present), MI-13 (2019–2023) (supported protest vote in primaries)
- Gabe Vasquez, NM-02 (2023–present) (called on Biden to drop out)
- Marc Veasey, TX-33 (2013–present) (called on Biden to drop out)
- Susan Wild, PA-07 (2019–present) and PA-15 (2018–2019) (called on Biden to drop out)

=== Former ===
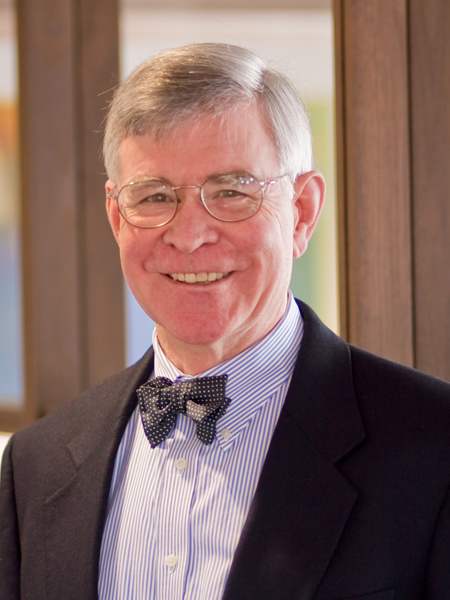
David Skaggs

- Chet Atkins, MA-05 (1985–1993) (called on Biden to drop out)
- Les AuCoin, OR-01 (1975–1993) (called on Biden to drop out)
- Brian Baird, WA-03 (1999–2011) (called on Biden to drop out)
- Mike Barnes, MD-08 (1979–1987) (called on Biden to drop out)
- Rick Boucher, VA-09 (1983–2011) (called on Biden to drop out)
- Carolyn Bourdeaux, GA-07 (2021–2023) (called on Biden to drop out)
- Nancy Boyda, KS-02 (2007–2009) (called on Biden to drop out)
- John Cavanaugh, NE-02 (1977–1981) (called on Biden to drop out)
- Peter DeFazio, OR-04 (1987–2023) (called on Biden to drop out)
- Edward Feighan, OH-19 (1983–1993) (called on Biden to drop out)
- John Hall, NY-19 (2007–2011) (called on Biden to drop out)
- Rush Holt Jr., NJ-12 (1999–2015) (called on Biden to drop out)
- Peter Kostmayer, PA-08 (1983–1993, 1977–1981) (called on Biden to drop out)
- Dennis Kucinich, OH-10 (1997–2013) (switched to Independent)
- John LaFalce, NY-29 (1993–2003), NY-32 (1983–1993) and NY-36 (1975–1983) (called on Biden to drop out)
- Andy Levin, MI-09 (2019–2023) (called on Biden to drop out)
- Andy Maguire, NJ-07 (1975–1981) (called on Biden to drop out)
- Jim McDermott, WA-07 (1989–2017) (called on Biden to drop out)
- Jim Moran, VA-08 (1991–2015) (called on Biden to drop out)
- Stephanie Murphy, FL-07 (2017–2023) (called on Biden to drop out)
- Steve Neal, NC-05 (1975–1995) (called on Biden to drop out)
- Rick Nolan, MN-08 (2013–2019) and MN-06 (1975–1981) (called on Biden to drop out)
- Tim Ryan, OH-17 (2003–2013), OH-13 (2013–2023), candidate in the 2020 Democratic presidential primaries and 2022 Democratic nominee for U.S. Senator from Ohio (called on Biden to drop out)
- Max Sandlin, TX-01 (1997–2005) (called on Biden to drop out)
- Philip Sharp, IN-02 (1983–1995) and IN-10 (1975–1983) (called on Biden to drop out)
- David Skaggs, CO-02 (1987–1999) (supported protest vote in primaries–not related to the Gaza war protest vote movements, later organized 24 former lawmakers to call on Biden to drop out)
- Mike Ward, KY-03 (1995–1997) (called on Biden to drop out)

== Statewide officials ==
=== Governors ===
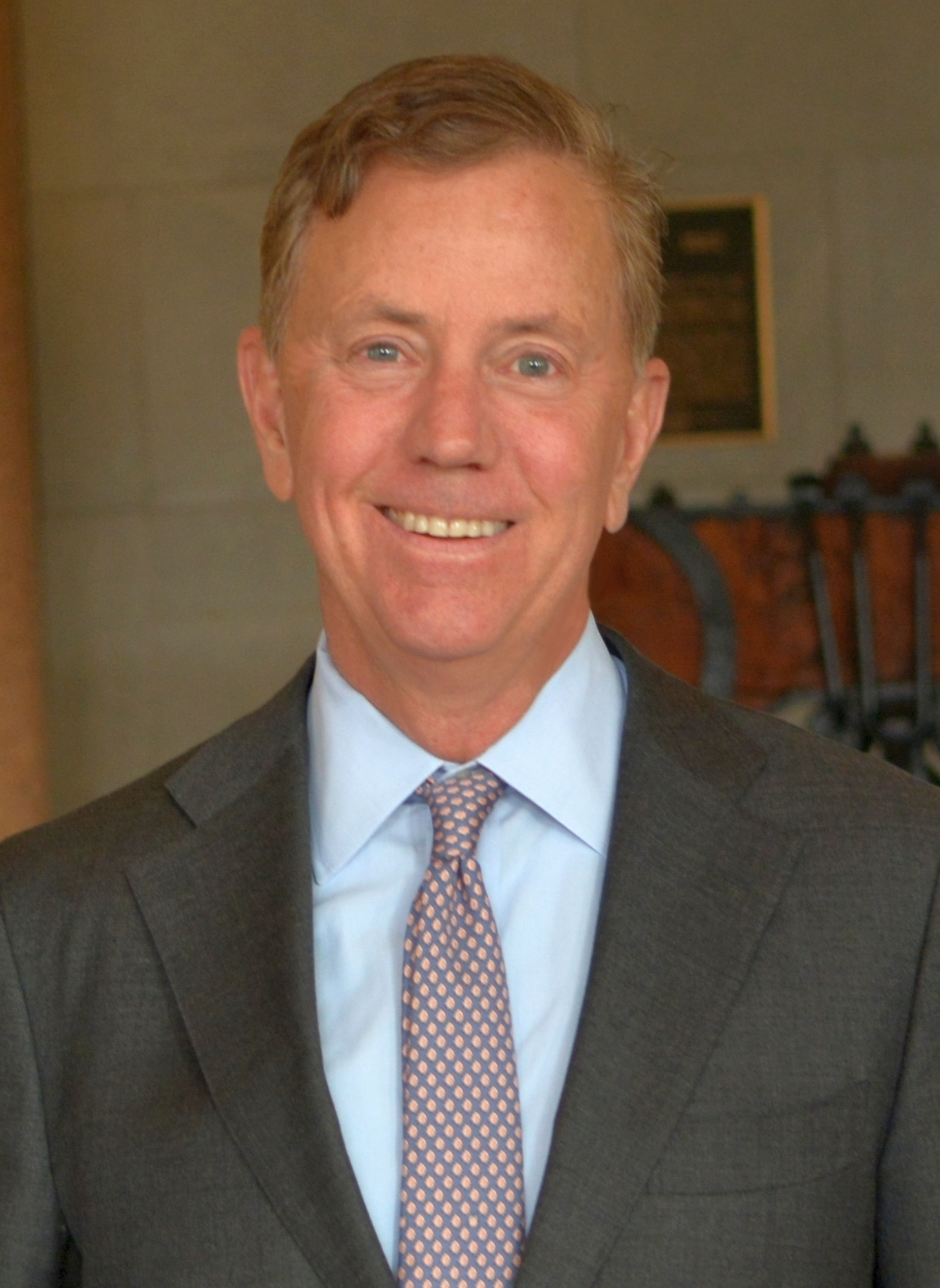
Ned Lamont

Current

- Ned Lamont, 89th Governor of Connecticut (2019–present) (called on Biden to drop out)

==== Former ====
- Neil Abercrombie, 7th Governor of Hawaii (2010–2014) (called on Biden to drop out)
- Rod Blagojevich, 40th Governor of Illinois (2003–2009) and U.S. Representative from lL-05 (1997–2003) (endorsed Donald Trump)
- Ben Cayetano, 5th Governor of Hawaii (1994–2002) (called on Biden to drop out)
- Madeleine Kunin, former Governor of Vermont (1985–1991)
- John David Waiheʻe III, 4th Governor of Hawaii (1986–1994) (called on Biden to drop out)
- David Walters, 24th Governor of Oklahoma (1991–1995) (called on Biden to drop out)

=== Lieutenant governors ===
==== Current ====
- Antonio Delgado, Lieutenant Governor of New York (2022–present) and U.S. Representative from NY-19 (2019–2022) (called on Biden to drop out)

== State legislators ==
=== Current ===
- Gabriel Acevero, Maryland state delegate from HD-39 (2019–present) (supported protest vote in primaries)
- Abraham Aiyash, Michigan State representative from HD-04 (2020–present) and Majority Floor Leader (2023–present)
- Jabari Brisport, New York State Senator from SD-25 (2021–present)
- Erin Byrnes, Michigan State representative from HD-15 (2023–present)
- Ryan Clancy, Wisconsin State assemblymember from AD-19 (2023–present) and member of the Milwaukee County Board of Supervisors from BD-4 (2020–2024)
- Alabas Farhat, Michigan State Representative from HD-03 (2023–present)
- Omar Fateh, Minnesota Senator from SD-62 (2021–present)
- Aisha Gomez, Minnesota State Representative from HD-62A (2019–present)
- Hodan Hassan, Minnesota State Representative from HD-62B (2019–present)
- Francesca Hong, Wisconsin State assemblymember from AD-76 (2021–present)
- Chris Larson, Wisconsin Senator from SD-07 (2011–present), former Senate Minority Leader (2013–2015)
- Jason Lewis, Massachusetts State Senator from 5th Middlesex district (2014–present), former Massachusetts State Representative from 31st Middlesex district (2009–2014) (called on Biden to drop out, but stated he would support Biden if he did not drop out)
- Tiara Mack, Rhode Island State Senator from the 6th district (2021–present)
- Darrin Madison, Wisconsin State assemblymember from AD-10 (2023–present)
- Zohran Mamdani, New York state assemblymember from AD-36 (2021–present)
- Jen McEwen, Minnesota Senator from SD-08 (2021–present)
- Marcela Mitaynes, New York state assemblymember from AD-51 (2021–present)
- Aaron Regunberg, former Rhode Island State Representative from the 4th district (2015–2019)
- Ruwa Romman, Georgia State Representative from HD-97 (2023–present)
- Samantha Sencer-Mura, Minnesota State Representative from HD-63A (2023–present)
- Kristina Shelton, Wisconsin State assemblymember from AD-90 (2021–present)
- Steve Shurtleff, New Hampshire House of Representatives member from Merrimack County, New Hampshire's 11th district (2004-2024), former Speaker of the New Hampshire House of Representatives (2018-2020) (endorsed Dean Phillips in the primaries)
- Andy Smith, Minnesota State Representative from HD-25B (2023–present)
- Phara Souffrant Forrest, New York state assemblymember from AD-57 (2021–present)
- Yasmin Trudeau, Washington State Senator from LD-27 (2021–present)
- Erika Uyterhoeven, Massachusetts State Representative from SD-27th Middlesex (2021–present) (supported protest vote in primaries)
- Dylan Wegela, Michigan State Representative from MH-26 (2023–present)
- Casey Weinstein, Ohio State Representative from OH-34 (2023–present) (called on Biden to drop out)
- Karen Whitsett, Michigan State Representative from HD-04 (2018–present)
- Jay Xiong, Minnesota State Representative from HD-67B (2019–present)

=== Former ===
- Stewart W. Bainum Jr., Member of the Maryland Senate from the 20th district (1983–1987) (called on Biden to drop out)
- Rubén Díaz Sr., Member of the New York Senate from the 32nd district (2003–2017) (endorsed Donald Trump)
- Sadaf Jaffer, former New Jersey Assemblymember from LD-16 (2022–2024) and former Mayor of Montgomery Township (2019–2020)
- Kwame Kilpatrick, Member of the Michigan House of Representatives from the 9th district (1997–2002) (endorsed Donald Trump)
- Nina Turner, former Ohio Senator from SD-25 (2008–2014)

== Municipal and local officials ==
=== Mayors ===
- Abdullah Hammoud, Mayor of Dearborn (2022–present) and former State Representative from HD-15 (2017–2021)

=== County officials ===
- Teresa Mosqueda, King County Councilmember from District 8 (2024–present) and former at-large Seattle City Councilmember (2017–2024)

=== City officials ===
==== Current ====
- Tiffany Cabán, New York City Council member from the CD-22 (2022–present)
- Aisha Chughtai, Minneapolis City Council member from Ward 10 (2022–present)
- Adam Frisch, Member of the Aspen City Council (2011–2019), and nominee for Colorado's 3rd congressional district in 2022 and 2024
- Shahana Hanif, New York City Council member from CD-39 (2022–present)
- Mitra Jalali, Saint Paul City Council member from Ward 4 (2018–present), City Council President (2024–present)
- Sandy Nurse, New York City Council member from CD-37 (2022–present)
- Chi Ossé, New York City Council member from CD-36 (2022–present)
- Gabriela Santiago-Romero, Detroit City council member from District 6 (2022–present)
- Mary D. Waters, at-large Detroit City council member (2022–present), and former Michigan State Representative from HD-04 (2001–2006)

==== Former ====
- Alondra Cano, former member of the Minneapolis City Council from the 9th Ward (2014-2022)
- Andrew Stein, President of the New York City Council (1986–1994), Borough President of Manhattan (1978–1985), Member of the New York State Assembly from the 65th district (1973–1977) and the 62nd district (1969–1972) (endorsed Donald Trump)

== Notable individuals ==
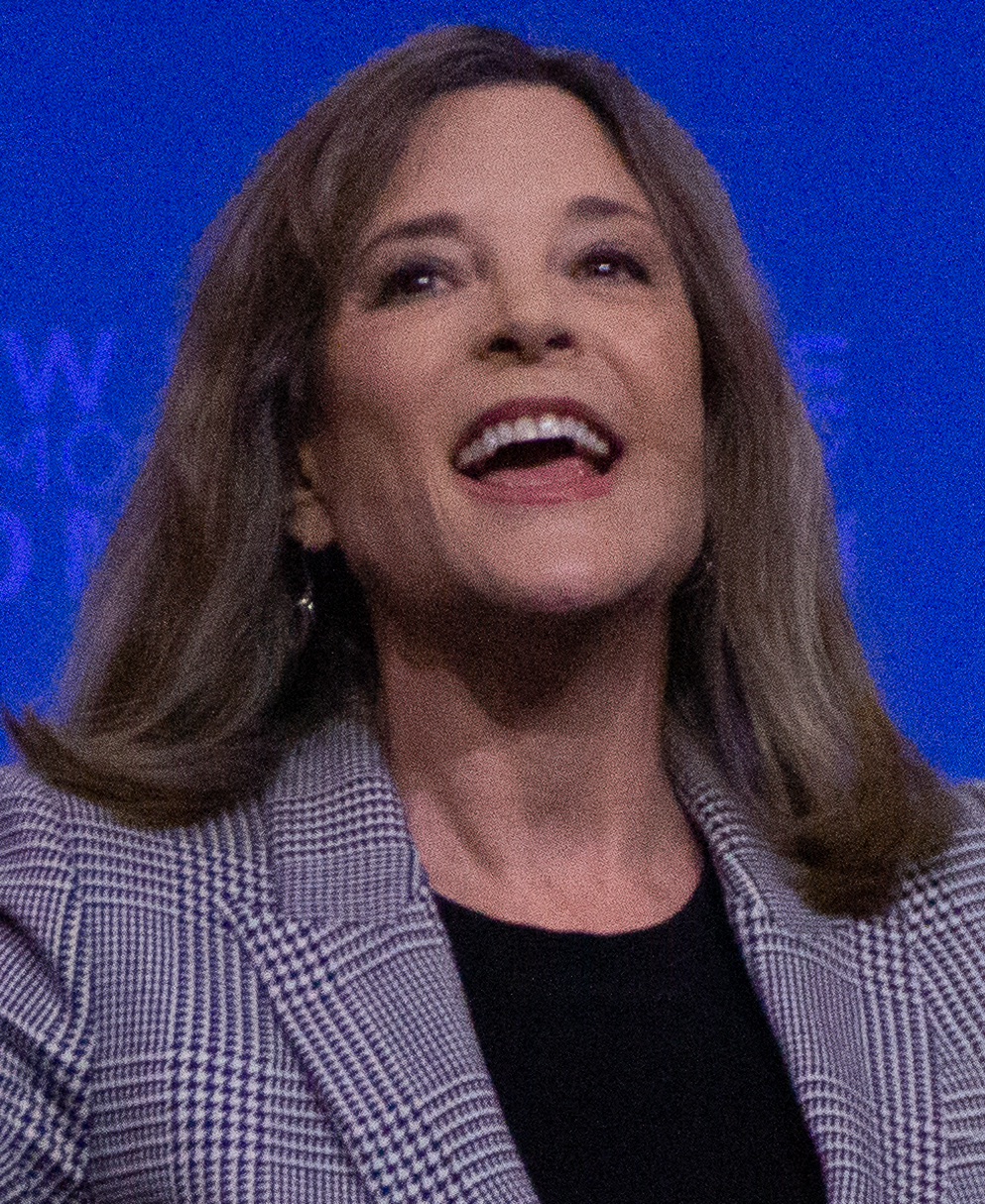
Marianne Williamson

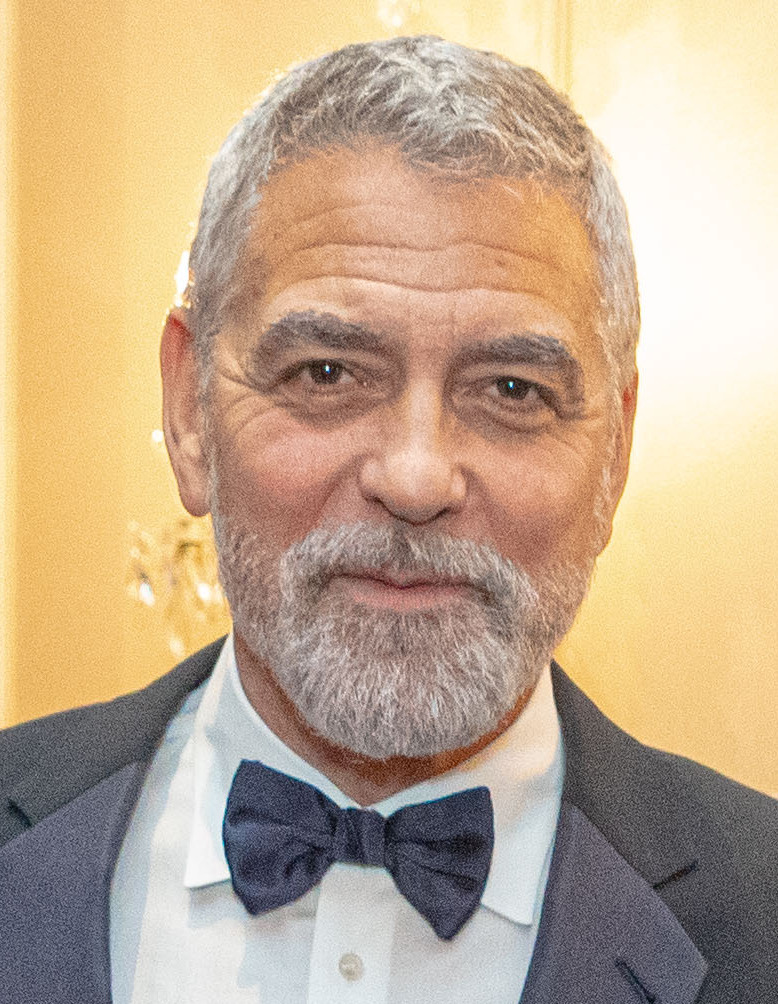
George Clooney

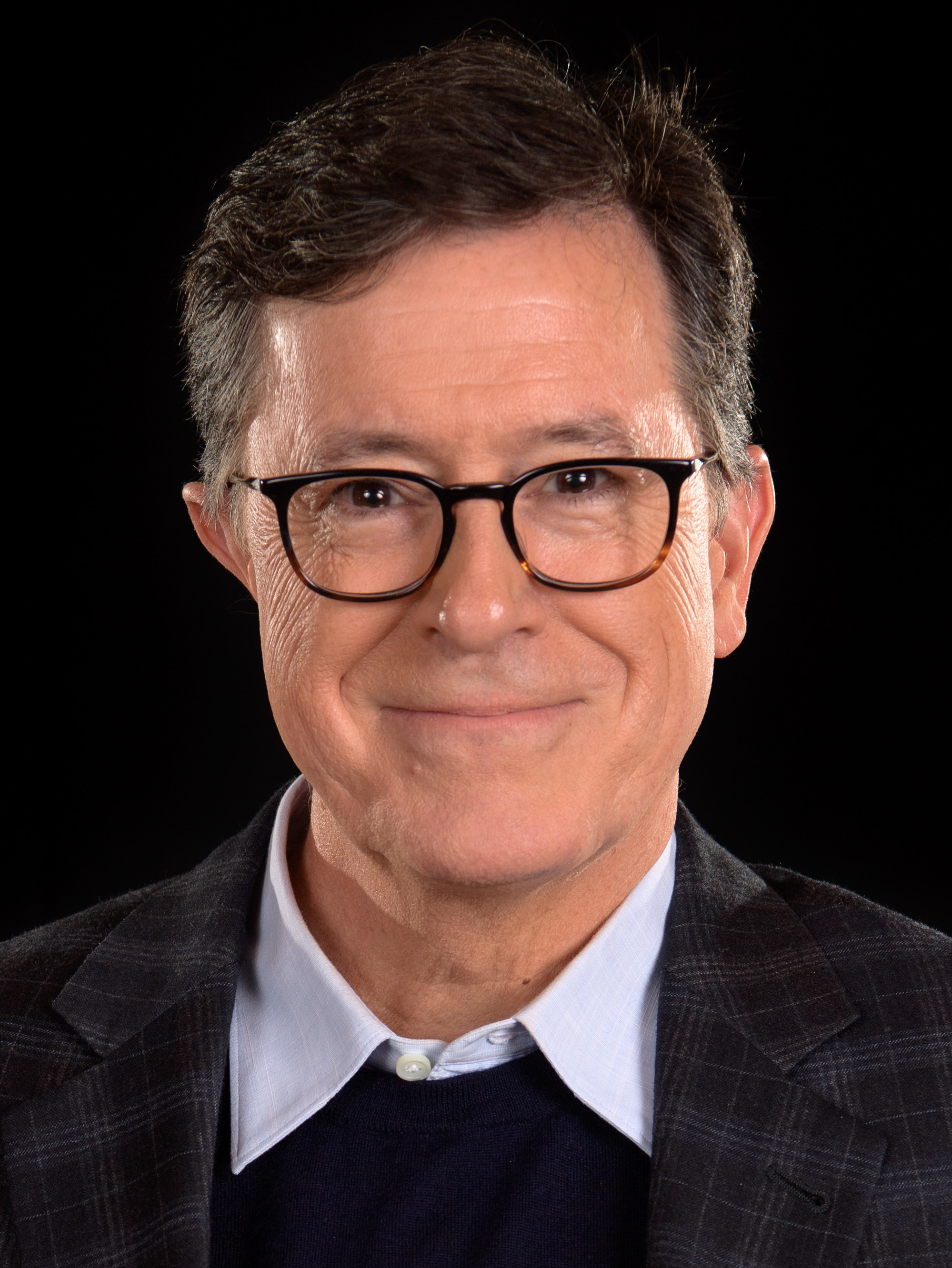
Stephen Colbert

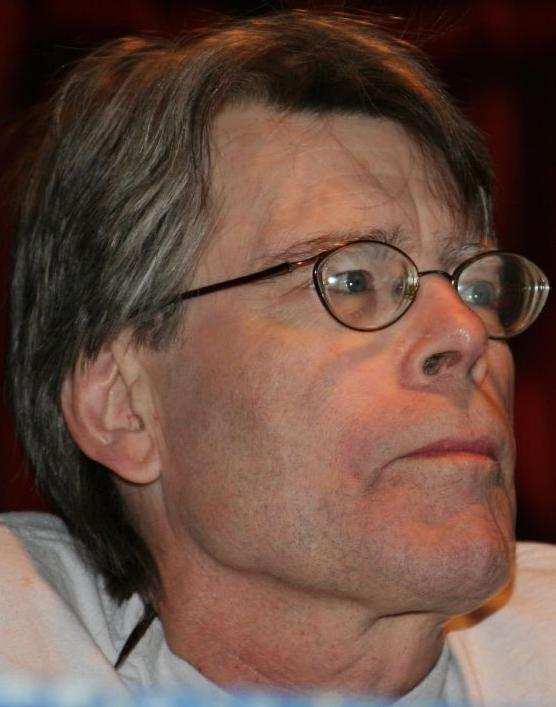
Stephen King

- Daniella Ballou-Aares, CEO of the Leadership Now Project
- Charles Barkley, former NBA player and television analyst
- Nasser Beydoun, former executive director of the Arab American Chamber of Commerce and a Democratic candidate in the 2024 United States Senate election in Michigan.
- Eric Braeden, actor (called on Biden to drop out)
- Rick Caruso, businessman and candidate in the 2022 Los Angeles mayoral election (called on Biden to drop out)
- James Carville, political consultant (called on Biden to drop out)
- George Clooney, actor and filmmaker (called on Biden to drop out)
- Stephen Colbert, comedian and TV host (called on Biden to drop out)
- Bob Costas, sportscaster (called on Biden to drop out)
- John Cusack, actor (called on Biden to drop out)
- Barry Diller, IAC chairman
- Abigail Disney, filmmaker and activist
- Maureen Dowd, opinion columnist for The New York Times (called on Biden to drop out)
- Ari Emanuel, Endeavor CEO
- Mia Farrow, actress (called on Biden to drop out)
- Thomas Friedman, columnist for The New York Times (called on Biden to drop out)
- Scott Galloway, New York University professor (called on Biden to drop out)
- Michelle Goldberg, an op-ed columnist for The New York Times
- Sara Haines, TV host (called on Biden to drop out)
- Reed Hastings, Netflix co-founder and executive chairman (called on Biden to drop out)
- David Ignatius, associate editor and columnist for The Washington Post (called on Biden to drop out)
- Van Jones, political analyst and former Obama advisor (called on Biden to drop out)
- Ashley Judd, actress (called on Biden to drop out)
- Stephen King, writer (called on Biden to drop out)
- Ezra Klein, journalist and podcast host (called on Biden to drop out)
- Nicholas Kristof, columnist for The New York Times (called on Biden to drop out)
- Paul Krugman, columnist for The New York Times (called on Biden to drop out)
- Mark Leibovich, staff writer at The Atlantic (called on Biden to drop out)
- Lawrence Lessig, Harvard Law School professor and founder of Creative Commons (called on Biden to drop out)
- Damon Lindelof, television showrunner (called on Biden to drop out)
- Jon Lovett, podcaster, comedian, and speechwriter
- Johanna Maska, communications consultant
- Bill Maher, comedian and television host (called on Biden to drop out)
- Michael Moore, left-wing activist and film producer (called on Biden to drop out)
- Michael Novogratz, CEO of Galaxy Investment Partners (called on Biden to drop out)
- Ijeoma Oluo, writer
- Jason Palmer, businessman and candidate in the 2024 Democratic Party presidential primaries (called on Biden to drop out)
- Rob Reiner, filmmaker and actor (called on Biden to drop out)
- Linda Sarsour, political activist and co-chair of the 2017 Women's March
- Shaun Scott, filmmaker and activist
- Adam Serwer, journalist and author
- Lionel Shriver, novelist and journalist (endorsed Ron DeSantis)
- Nate Silver, political statistician
- Dawn Staley, basketball coach and former player
- Gideon Stein, major donor (called on Biden to drop out)
- Paul Tagliabue, retired NFL commissioner (called on Biden to drop out)
- Cenk Uygur, political commentator
- Christy Walton, philanthropist and Walmart heiress (called on Biden to drop out)
- Jeffrey P. Weaver, political strategist who served as campaign manager for the Bernie Sanders 2016 presidential campaign and an advisor for the Bernie Sanders 2020 presidential campaign (senior advisor for Dean Phillips in the primaries)
- Marianne Williamson, author, founder of Project Angel Food, and candidate in the 2020 and 2024 Democratic presidential primaries (called on Biden to drop out)
- Andrew Yang, candidate for president in 2020 and for mayor of New York City in 2021

== See also ==
- List of Republicans who opposed the Donald Trump 2024 presidential campaign
- List of Joe Biden 2024 presidential campaign primary endorsements
- List of Republicans who opposed the Donald Trump 2020 presidential campaign
- List of Republicans who opposed the Donald Trump 2016 presidential campaign
- List of Democrats who opposed the Hillary Clinton 2016 presidential campaign
