= 2024 United States Senate election in Michigan =

- November 5, 2024
- Turnout: 73.5% ▲16.78%
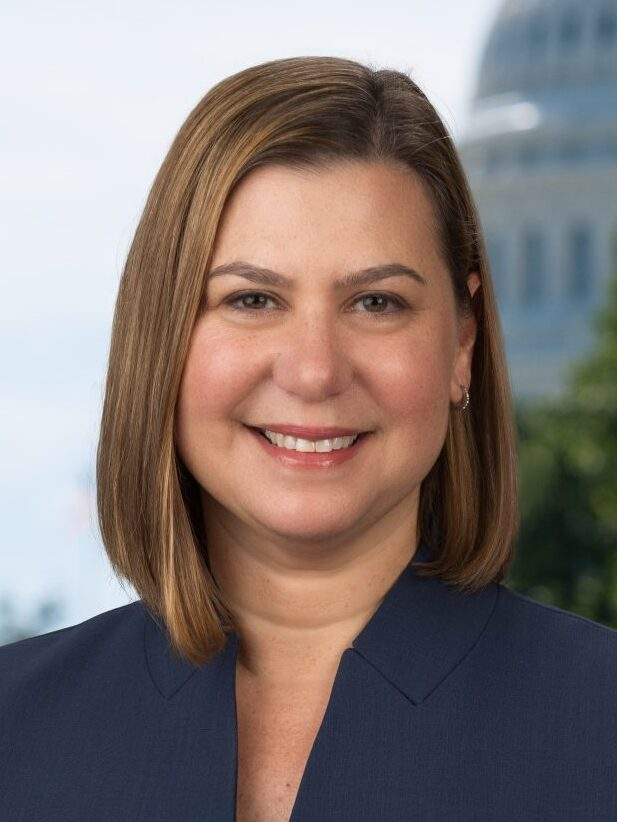

Nominee	Elissa Slotkin	Mike Rogers
Party	Democratic	Republican
Popular vote	2,712,686	2,693,680
Percentage	48.64%	48.30%
- Slotkin: 40–50% 50–60% 60–70% 70–80% 80–90% >90% Rogers: 40–50% 50–60% 60–70% 70–80% 80–90% Tie: 40–50% No data
U.S. senator before election
Debbie Stabenow
Democratic
Elected U.S. Senator
Elissa Slotkin
Democratic

The 2024 United States Senate election in Michigan was held on November 5, 2024, to elect a Class I member of the United States Senate to represent the state of Michigan. It was held concurrently with the 2024 United States presidential election, other elections to the U.S. Senate, elections to the U.S. House of Representatives, and various state and local elections. Democratic congresswoman Elissa Slotkin won her first term in office, narrowly defeating Republican former congressman Mike Rogers. She succeeded Democratic incumbent Debbie Stabenow, who did not seek a fifth term.

Primary elections took place on August 6, 2024. Slotkin won the Democratic nomination with 76% of the vote over actor Hill Harper, and Rogers won the Republican nomination with 63% of the vote over former congressman Justin Amash. As Republican presidential nominee Donald Trump carried Michigan on the same ballot, this was the first time Michigan voted for candidates of different political parties for U.S. senator and president since Democrat Don Riegle was re-elected as Republican George H. W. Bush carried the state in 1988.

On November 6, 2024, major news organizations projected that Slotkin had won the election. Slotkin received 23,847 fewer votes than Kamala Harris, while Rogers received 122,956 fewer votes than Donald Trump.

== Background ==
Michigan is considered to be a purple state. However, Democrats had seen much more success in recent years in the state. At the time of the election, Democrats controlled both U.S. Senate seats, seven of 13 of the U.S. House congressional delegation, the minimum majority in both houses of the Michigan Legislature, and all statewide offices.

This race was considered to be competitive given the state's nearly even partisan lean and that there was no incumbent; however, most polls and ratings had Slotkin as the slight favorite to win. In-fighting among Michigan Republicans after the 2022 elections left the state party poor in funding for the U.S. Senate race and defaulting on a bank loan. The MIGOP also failed to meet campaign finance reporting deadlines.

== Democratic primary ==
=== Campaign ===
Elissa Slotkin led the field in fundraising with nearly $16 million raised as of April 2024. Nearly $6 million of this had been raised before August 2023. She continued to dominate fundraising in the second quarter of 2024 outpacing her Republican opponent by as much as three-to-one with 95% of her contributions coming from donors giving $100 or less according to the campaign.

Slotkin released the first TV ad of the primary campaign on May 28 which focused on her work in national security in the George W. Bush and Obama administrations.

==== Campaign contribution allegations ====
In November 2023, Hill Harper claimed that he had been offered $20 million in campaign contributions from former Motown Motion Picture Studios owner Linden Nelson if he would drop out of the Senate race to mount a primary challenge against U.S. Representative Rashida Tlaib. The allegation was denied by Nelson. Nasser Beydoun subsequently also alleged that former Michigan Democratic Party chair Lon Johnson had approached him with an identical offer to drop out of the Senate race and primary Tlaib. Johnson denied the claims, saying, "that's just crazy. I didn't offer him $20 million, or any other amount of money, to run against Rashida. That's insane." Beydoun was later disqualified from the ballot.

=== Candidates ===
==== Nominee ====
- Elissa Slotkin, U.S. representative for Michigan's 7th congressional district (2019–2025)

==== Eliminated in primary ====
- Hill Harper, actor and former member of the President's Cancer Panel

==== Disqualified ====
- Nasser Beydoun, businessman and former executive director of the Arab American Chamber of Commerce (endorsed Harper)

==== Withdrawn ====
- Zack Burns, attorney
- Leslie Love, former state representative for the 10th district (2014–2020)
- Pamela Pugh, president of the Michigan State Board of Education (2015–present) (ran for U.S. House)

==== Declined ====
- Jocelyn Benson, Michigan secretary of state (2019–present)
- Pete Buttigieg, U.S. secretary of transportation (2021–2025), former mayor of South Bend, Indiana (2012–2020), and candidate for president of the United States in 2020
- Debbie Dingell, U.S. representative for Michigan's 6th congressional district (2015–present) (ran for re-election)
- Mike Duggan, mayor of Detroit (2014–2026)
- Abdul El-Sayed, Wayne County health director and candidate for governor of Michigan in 2018 (endorsed Harper)
- Garlin Gilchrist, lieutenant governor of Michigan (2019–present)
- Dan Kildee, U.S. representative for Michigan's 8th congressional district (2013–2025) (endorsed Slotkin)
- Andy Levin, former U.S. representative for Michigan's 9th congressional district (2019–2023)
- Karen McDonald, Oakland County prosecutor (2021–present)
- Mallory McMorrow, state senator for the 8th district (2019–present)
- Dana Nessel, Michigan attorney general (2019–present)
- Hillary Scholten, U.S. representative for Michigan's 3rd congressional district (2023–present) (ran for re-election, endorsed Slotkin)
- Debbie Stabenow, incumbent U.S. senator (2001–2025)
- Haley Stevens, U.S. representative for Michigan's 11th congressional district (2019–present) (ran for re-election, endorsed Slotkin)
- Shri Thanedar, U.S. representative for Michigan's 13th congressional district (2023–present) (ran for re-election)
- Gretchen Whitmer, governor of Michigan (2019–present)

=== Endorsements ===
Hill Harper

U.S. representatives

- Brenda Lawrence, MI-14 (2015–2023)

State legislators

- Tyrone Carter, state representative from the 6th district (2019–present)
- Stephanie Young, state representative from the 8th district (2021–present)

Local officials

- Jerry Clayton, Washtenaw County sheriff (2008–2024)
- Abdul El-Sayed, director of the Wayne County Health Department
- Warren Evans, Wayne County executive (2015–present)

Individuals

- Nasser Beydoun, businessman and former candidate for this seat
- Dave Chappelle, comedian
- John Drew Sheard Sr., presiding bishop of the Church of God in Christ (2021–present)

Organizations

- Church of God in Christ Michigan/Canadian Council of Bishops PAC
- Emgage Michigan
- Michigan Democratic Party Black Caucus

Labor unions

- American Postal Workers Union Detroit District Area Local 295
- IATSE Local 26

Newspapers

- The Arab American News
- The Michigan Chronicle
Elissa Slotkin

Statewide officials

- James Blanchard, former governor of Michigan (1983–1991)

U.S. representatives

- Gabby Giffords, AZ-08 (2007–2012}
- Dan Kildee, MI-8 (2013–2025)
- Jamie Raskin, MD-08 (2017–present)
- Hillary Scholten, MI-3 (2023–present)
- Mikie Sherrill, NJ-11 (2019–2025)
- Haley Stevens, MI-11 (2019–present)

State cabinet officials

- Randy Watkins, former senior investigator of the Michigan Office of Financial and Insurance Regulation (1979–2010)

State legislators

- Sarah Anthony, state senator from the 21st district (2023–present)
- Rosemary Bayer, state senator from the 13th district (2023–present)
- Winnie Brinks, majority leader of the Michigan Senate (2023–present) from the 29th district (2019–present)
- Jeremy Moss, state senator from the 7th district (2023–present)
- 9 state representatives

Local officials

- Barbara Byrum, Ingham County clerk (2013–present)
- David Coulter, Oakland County executive (2019–present)
- Tim Greimel, mayor of Pontiac (2021–present)
- Andy Meisner, former Oakland County treasurer (2009–2021)
- Andy Schor, mayor of Lansing (2018–present)
- Robert Wittenberg, Oakland County treasurer (2021–present)

Individuals

- Jon Horford, NBA basketball player

Organizations

- Brady PAC
- EMILY's List
- End Citizens United
- Fairshake
- Feminist Majority PAC
- Giffords
- Jewish Democratic Council of America
- Joint Action Committee for Political Affairs
- League of Conservation Voters
- National Women's Political Caucus
- Planned Parenthood Action Fund
- Reproductive Freedom for All
- VoteVets

Labor unions

- Amalgamated Transit Union
- IAFF Michigan (Note: Michigan Professional Union and Local 412)
- IBEW Michigan
- International Association of Machinists and Aerospace Workers Michigan
- International Union of Bricklayers and Allied Craftworkers
- IOUE Local 324
- Iron Workers' Union
- IUPAT
- Laborers' Union
- Michigan Building Trades Council
- Michigan Education Association
- Michigan Pipe Trades Association
- National Education Association
- SMART
- United Steelworkers District Council 1
- Utility Workers Union of America

Newspapers

- The Detroit News
Nasser Beydoun (disqualified)

Organizations

- Vote Common Good
Pamela Pugh (withdrawn)

Local officials

- Karen Weaver, former mayor of Flint (2015–2019)
Declined to endorse

Presidents

- Barack Obama, former president of the United States (2009–2017)

U.S. senators

- Debbie Stabenow, incumbent U.S. senator from Michigan (2001–2025)

Labor unions

- United Auto Workers

=== Fundraising ===
Campaign finance reports as of March 31, 2024
Candidate	Raised	Spent	Cash on hand
Nasser Beydoun (D) (Note: Disqualified candidate)	$855,335	$678,582	$148,721
Hill Harper (D)	$2,037,766 (Note: $462,916 of this total was self-funded by Harper)	$1,596,454	$441,312
Leslie Love (D) (Note: Withdrawn candidate)	$23,395	$17,017	$17,017
Pamela Pugh (D)	$90,638	$81,363	$9,275
Elissa Slotkin (D)	$16,094,088	$7,473,267	$8,620,820
Source: Federal Election Commission

=== Polling ===
Poll source	Date(s) administered	Sample size (Note: Key: A – all adults RV – registered voters LV – likely voters V – unclear)	Margin of error	Nasser Beydoun	Hill Harper	Leslie Love	Elissa Slotkin	Other	Undecided
Mitchell Research (Note: Poll sponsored by the Michigan Information and Research Service)	June 3, 2024	268 (LV)	± 6.0%	1%	8%	–	53%	–	38%
Mitchell Research	March 15–16, 2024	260 (LV)	–	3%	11%	–	59%	–	27%
Target Insyght (Note: Poll sponsored by the Michigan Information and Research Service and the Northern Michigan Chamber Alliance)	January 4–10, 2024	600 (LV)	± 4.5%	0%	7%	2%	65%	26% (Note: "Other candidates & undecided" with 26%)	
Public Policy Polling (D) (Note: Poll sponsored by the Voter Protection Project, who have not publicly endorsed any candidate; however, they sent out a press release that describes Elissa Slotkin as "the strongest candidate" in the race.)	December 28–29, 2023	549 (LV)	–	2%	12%	3%	50%	–	34%
Public Policy Polling (D)	December 28–29, 2023	549 (LV)	–	–	14%	–	56%	–	31%
Emerson College	August 1–2, 2023	551 (RV)	± 4.1%	2%	8%	2%	34%	29% (Note: Zack Burns and Jacquise Purifoy with 3%; Pamela Pugh with 1%; "Someone Else" with 22%)	25%

=== Results ===
Results by county: Slotkin: 60–70%; 70–80%; 80–90%; >90%

Democratic primary results
Party	Candidate	Votes	%
Democratic	Elissa Slotkin	712,791	76.33%
Democratic	Hill Harper	221,053	23.67%
Total votes		933,844	100.0%

== Republican primary ==
=== Candidates ===
==== Nominee ====
- Mike Rogers, former U.S. representative for Michigan's 8th congressional district (2001–2015)

==== Eliminated in primary ====
- Justin Amash, former U.S. representative for Michigan's 3rd congressional district (2011–2021)
- Sherry O'Donnell, physician and candidate for Michigan's 5th congressional district in 2022

==== Withdrawn ====
- James Craig, former chief of the Detroit Police Department (2013–2021) and disqualified candidate for governor of Michigan in 2022 (endorsed Rogers)
- Michael Hoover, pest control company owner
- Peter Meijer, former U.S. representative for Michigan's 3rd congressional district (2021–2023)
- Sandy Pensler, former Wayne County commissioner and candidate for U.S. Senate in 2018 (endorsed Rogers, remained on ballot)
- Nikki Snyder, member of the Michigan State Board of Education (2017–present) (ran for U.S. House)
- Alexandria Taylor, former Allen Park city attorney (ran for Michigan Supreme Court)
- J. D. Wilson, consulting firm owner (ran for U.S. House)

==== Declined ====
- Tom Barrett, former state senator for the 24th district (2019–2023) and nominee for Michigan's 7th congressional district in 2022 (ran for U.S. House)
- Brian Calley, former lieutenant governor of Michigan (2011–2019) and candidate for governor of Michigan in 2018
- Tudor Dixon, conservative media personality and nominee for governor of Michigan in 2022
- John James, U.S. representative for Michigan's 10th congressional district (2023–present) and nominee for U.S. Senate in 2018 and 2020 (ran for re-election)
- Perry Johnson, businessman, former candidate for president in 2024 and disqualified candidate for governor of Michigan in 2022
- Lisa McClain, U.S. representative for Michigan's 9th congressional district (2021–present) (endorsed Rogers)
- Candice Miller, Macomb County Public Works commissioner (2017–present), former U.S. representative for Michigan's 10th congressional district (2003–2016), and former Michigan secretary of state (1995–2003) (endorsed Rogers)
- John Tuttle, vice chair of the New York Stock Exchange

=== Campaign ===
Amash, Pensler and Rogers were certified to be on the Republican primary ballot at the end of May.

==== Residency controversy ====
Even though Rogers is a former Michigan congressman, he owns a home in Cape Coral, Florida, and was registered to vote in Florida in 2022. He subsequently purchased a home in White Lake Township, living outside Brighton while that home is remodeled. He also changed his voting registration back to Michigan. His Florida residency became the subject of negative ads against him. New controversy arose regarding the completion of Rogers's new home.

=== Endorsements ===
Justin Amash

U.S. senators

- Rand Paul, Kentucky (2011–present)

Newspapers and other media

- Detroit Free Press (primary only)

Organizations

- FreedomWorks (defunct)
- Republican Liberty Caucus
Sherry O'Donnell

Executive office officials

- Michael Flynn, former director of the Defense Intelligence Agency (2012–2014)
- Thomas Homan, former director of the U.S. Immigration and Customs Enforcement (2017–2018)

State legislators

- David Agema, state representative from Michigan's 74th House of Representatives district (2007–2012)

Individuals

- Robert Malone, physician and biochemist
- Peter McCullough, former cardiologist
- Ted Nugent, musician
Mike Rogers

Executive branch officials

- Donald Trump, 45th president of the United States (2017–2021)

Federal officials

- John Bolton, former National Security advisor (2018–2019)

U.S. senators

- Katie Britt, Alabama (2023–present)
- Shelley Moore Capito, West Virginia (2015–present)
- Tom Cotton, Arkansas (2015–present)
- Steve Daines, Montana (2015–present)
- Joni Ernst, Iowa (2015–present)
- John Kennedy, Louisiana (2017–present)
- Tim Scott, South Carolina (2013–present)

U.S. representatives

- Jack Bergman, MI-01 (2017–present)
- Lisa McClain, MI-09 (Note: Numbered as the 10th from 2021 to 2023) (2021–present)
- Candice Miller, MI-10 (2003–2016)
- John Moolenaar, MI-02 (Note: Numbered as the 4th from 2015–2023) (2015–present)
- Tim Walberg, MI-05 (2007–2009, 2011–present)

Local officials

- James Craig, former chief of the Detroit Police Department (2013–2021) and former 2024 candidate for this seat

Labor unions

- Police Officers Association of Michigan

Newspapers and other media

- The Detroit News

Organizations

- Americans for Prosperity Action
- Michigan Farm Bureau
Sandy Pensler (withdrawn)

Individuals

- Vivek Ramaswamy, pharmaceutical executive and 2024 Republican presidential candidate

=== Fundraising ===
Campaign finance reports as of June 30, 2024
Candidate	Raised	Spent	Cash on hand
Justin Amash (R)	$662,743	$633,56	$400,706
Sherry O'Donnell (R)	$422,182	$376,550	$46,517
Mike Rogers (R)	$5,005,548	$2,489,477	$2,516,070
James Craig (R)	$136,670	$136,670	$0
Michael Hoover (R)	$236,591	$234,931	$1,660
Peter Meijer (R)	$1,083,664	$985,747	$97,916
Sandy Pensler (R)	$4,959,782	$3,894,186	$1,065,595
Sharon Savage (R)	$100,130	$50,956	$49,174
Alexandria Taylor (R)	$26,120	$26,120	$0
J. D. Wilson (R)	$8,086	$6,438	$1,647
Source: Federal Election Commission

=== Polling ===
Poll source	Date(s) administered	Sample size	Margin of error	Justin Amash	James Craig	Peter Meijer	Sherry O'Donnell	Sandy Pensler	Mike Rogers	Other	Undecided
	July 20, 2024	Pensler withdraws from the race									
Tarrance Group (Note: Poll sponsored by Rogers's campaign)	July 8–10, 2024	500 (LV)	± 4.5%	14%	–	–	5%	14%	52%	–	16%
Mitchell Research	June 3, 2024	266 (LV)	± 6.0%	8%	–	–	0%	3%	28%	–	61%
Public Policy Polling (D)	May 22–23, 2024	486 (LV)	–	11%	–	–	3%	12%	30%	3% (Note: "Someone else" with 3%)	41%
Emerson College	April 30 – May 1, 2024	545 (LV)	± 4.1%	8%	–	–	2%	3%	32%	–	54%
	April 26, 2024	Meijer withdraws from the race									
Mitchell Research	March 15–16, 2024	288 (LV)	–	6%	–	7%	–	1%	27%	–	59%
Market Resource Group (R)	February 19–22, 2024	600 (LV)	–	–	–	7%	–	2%	23%	6% (Note: "Someone else" with 6%)	62%
	February 13, 2024	Craig withdraws from the race									
Target Insyght	January 4–10, 2024	600 (LV)	± 4.0%	–	33%	11%	1%	2%	20%	1% (Note: Michael Hoover with 1%; Sherry O'Donnell, Bensson Samuel, Sharon Savage, Alexandria Taylor, and J. D. Wilson with 0%)	33%
Public Policy Polling (D)	October 9–10, 2023	430 (LV)	± 4.7%	–	30%	–	–	–	19%	–	51%
Emerson College	August 1–2, 2023	477 (RV)	± 4.4%	–	–	9%	–	–	12%	50% (Note: Nikki Snyder with 6%; Michael Hoover with 3%; Ezra Scott, Alexandria Taylor, and John Tuttle with 1%; "Other" with 39%)	29%

=== Results ===
Results by county: Rogers: 30–40%; 40–50%; 50–60%; 60–70%; 70–80%; 80–90%

Republican primary results
Party	Candidate	Votes	%
Republican	Mike Rogers	555,766	63.19%
Republican	Justin Amash	137,565	15.64%
Republican	Sherry O'Donnell	106,466	12.10%
Republican	Sandy Pensler (withdrawn)	79,772	9.07%
Total votes		879,569	100.0%

== Third-party candidates ==
=== Declared ===
- Doug Dern (Natural Law), chair of the Natural Law Party and perennial candidate
- Douglas Marsh (Green), newspaper journalist
- Joseph Solis-Mullen (Libertarian), college professor
- Dave Stein (U.S. Taxpayers), retired CDL A truck operator

== General election ==
=== Predictions ===
Source	Ranking	As of
The Cook Political Report	Tossup	October 8, 2024
Inside Elections	Tilt D	September 26, 2024
Sabato's Crystal Ball	Lean D	September 25, 2024
Decision Desk HQ/The Hill	Lean D	October 9, 2024
Elections Daily	Lean D	October 9, 2024
CNalysis	Lean D	October 9, 2024
RealClearPolitics	Tossup	October 9, 2024
Split Ticket	Lean D	October 23, 2024
538	Likely D	October 23, 2024

=== Post-primary endorsements ===
Mike Rogers (R)

U.S. senators

- John Thune, Senate minority whip (2021–2025) from South Dakota (2005–present)

U.S. representatives

- Fred Upton, former U.S. representative from Michigan's 4th congressional district (1987–1993), Michigan's 6th congressional district (1993–2023)

Statewide elected officials

- Rick Snyder, former governor of Michigan (2011–2019)

Mayors

- Bill Bazzi, mayor of Dearborn Heights, Michigan

Organizations

- College Republicans at the University of Michigan
- Michigan Farm Bureau
Elissa Slotkin (D)

U.S. executive branch officials

- Kamala Harris, vice president of the United States (2021–2025)
- Barack Obama, 44th president of the United States (2009–2017)

U.S. senators

- Gary Peters, Michigan (2015–Present)
- Debbie Stabenow, Michigan (2001–2025)

U.S. representatives

- Liz Cheney, former U.S. representative from Wyoming's at-large congressional district (2017–2023) (Republican)

Statewide officials

- Gretchen Whitmer, governor of Michigan (2019–present)

State legislators

- Adrian Boafo, Maryland state delegate from the 23rd district (2023–present)

Local officials

- Dave Bing, former mayor of Detroit (2009–2014)

Labor unions

- Actors' Equity Association
- United Auto Workers

=== Debates ===
2024 Michigan U.S. Senate election debate
No.	Date	Host	Moderators	Link	Democratic	Republican
Key: P Participant A Absent N Not invited I Invited W Withdrawn						
Key: P Participant A Absent N Not invited I Invited W Withdrawn					Slotkin	Rogers
1	October 8, 2024	WOOD-TV	Rick Albin		P	P
2	October 14, 2024	WXYZ-TV	Carolyn Clifford; Alicia Smith; Chuck Stokes		P	P

=== Polling ===
Aggregate polls

Source of poll aggregation	Dates administered	Dates updated	Elissa Slotkin (D)	Mike Rogers (R)	Undecided (Note: Calculated by taking the dƒifference of 100% and all other candidates combined.)	Margin
RealClearPolitics	October 24 – November 4, 2024	November 4, 2024	48.4%	46.1%	5.5%	Slotkin +2.3%
538	through November 4, 2024	November 4, 2024	48.7%	45.1%	6.2%	Slotkin +3.6%
270toWin	October 23 – November 4, 2024	November 4, 2024	48.6%	44.5%	6.9%	Slotkin +4.1%
TheHill/DDHQ	through November 4, 2024	November 4, 2024	49.1%	46.3%	4.6%	Slotkin +2.8%
Average			48.7%	45.5%	5.8%	Slotkin +3.2%

Poll source	Date(s) administered	Sample size	Margin of error	Elissa Slotkin (D)	Mike Rogers (R)	Other	Undecided
AtlasIntel	November 3–4, 2024	1,113 (LV)	± 3.0%	49%	48%	3% (Note: "Other" with 2%; "Blank/Null/Won't vote" with 1%)	1%
Research Co.	November 2–3, 2024	450 (LV)	± 4.6%	50%	44%	2% (Note: "Some other candidate" with 2%)	4%
Patriot Polling (R)	November 1–3, 2024	858 (RV)	± 3.0%	50%	49%	–	1%
The Trafalgar Group (R)	November 1–3, 2024	1,079 (LV)	± 2.9%	47%	47%	–	5%
InsiderAdvantage (R)	November 1–2, 2024	800 (LV)	± 3.7%	48%	48%	2%	2%
AtlasIntel	November 1–2, 2024	1,198 (LV)	± 3.0%	49%	47%	3%	1%
Emerson College (Note: Poll sponsored by The Hill)	October 30 – November 2, 2024	790 (LV)	± 3.4%	49%	45%	–	6%
Mitchell Research (Note: Poll sponsored by Michigan News Source)	October 29 – November 2, 2024	585 (LV)	± 4.0%	50%	48%	–	4%
Mitchell Research	October 29 – November 2, 2024	585 (LV)	± 4.0%	48%	46%	1% (Note: Solis-Mullen (L) with 1%)	2%
New York Times/Siena College	October 29 – November 2, 2024	998 (LV)	± 3.7%	48%	46%	–	6%
New York Times/Siena College	October 29 – November 2, 2024	998 (RV)	± 3.5%	45%	45%	–	9%
Mainstreet Research/FAU	October 25 – November 2, 2024	713 (LV)	± 3.6%	47%	43%	1% (Note: "Another candidate" with 1%)	9%
Mainstreet Research/FAU	October 25 – November 2, 2024	733 (RV)	± 3.6%	47%	42%	2% (Note: "Another candidate" with 2%)	10%
Morning Consult	October 23 – November 1, 2024	1,112 (LV)	± 3.0%	49%	41%	–	10%
OnMessage Inc. (R)	October 29–31, 2024	800 (LV)	–	47%	46%	–	7%
YouGov (Note: Poll conducted for The Times, Stanford University, Arizona State University, and Yale University)	October 25–31, 2024	940 (LV)	± 3.9%	51%	42%	–	7%
YouGov	October 25–31, 2024	985 (RV)	± 3.9%	51%	41%	–	8%
ActiVote	October 12–31, 2024	400 (LV)	± 4.9%	51%	49%	–	–
Marist College	October 27–30, 2024	1,214 (LV)	± 3.5%	52%	46%	1% (Note: "Another party's candidate" with 1%)	1%
Marist College	October 27–30, 2024	1,356 (RV)	± 3.3	51%	47%	1%	1%
AtlasIntel	October 27–30, 2024	1,136 (LV)	± 3.0%	50%	46%	3%	1%
Echleon Insights	October 27–30, 2024	600 (LV)	± 4.4%	48%	46%	5% (Note: Dern (NL), Marsh (G), and Stein (UST) with 1%; "Someone else" with 1%; "I did not vote for this office" with 1%)	1%
Mitchell Research	October 28–29, 2024	– (LV)	± 2.5%	47%	49%	–	10%
Tarrance Group (R) (Note: Poll sponsored by Rogers' campaign)	October 26–29, 2024	620 (LV)	± 4.1%	48%	50%	–	2%
AtlasIntel	October 25–29, 2024	983 (LV)	± 3.0%	49%	47%	3%	1%
EPIC-MRA (Note: Poll sponsored by the Detroit Free Press)	October 24–28, 2024	600 (LV)	± 4.0%	47%	42%	7% (Note: "Third party candidate" with 6%; "Did not or would not vote" with 1%)	3%
The Washington Post	October 24–28, 2024	1,003 (LV)	± 3.7%	48%	45%	–	7%
The Washington Post	October 24–28, 2024	1,003 (RV)	± 3.7%	46%	45%	–	9%
Fox News	October 24–28, 2024	988 (LV)	± 3.0%	51%	47%	–	2%
Fox News	October 24–28, 2024	1,275 (RV)	± 2.5%	51%	46%	–	2%
CNN/SSRS	October 23–28, 2024	726 (LV)	± 4.7%	48%	42%	9% (Note: "Other" with 7%; "Neither" with 2%)	1%
InsiderAdvantage (R)	October 26–27, 2024	800 (LV)	± 3.7%	48%	48%	1%	3%
Emerson College (Note: Poll sponsored by RealClearWorld)	October 25–27, 2024	1,000 (LV)	± 3.0%	48%	46%	–	6%
Suffolk University (Note: Poll sponsored by USA Today)	October 24–27, 2024	500 (LV)	± 4.4%	47%	45%	5% (Note: "Refused" with 2%; Marsh (G), Solis-Mullen (L), and Stein (UST) with 1%; Dern (NL) with <1%)	3%
Susquehanna Polling and Research (R)	October 23–27, 2024	400 (LV)	± 4.9%	48%	47%	1% (Note: "Refused" with 1%)	4%
Patriot Polling (R)	October 24–26, 2024	796 (RV)	–	51%	48%	–	–
Glengariff Group (Note: Poll sponsored by The Detroit News and WDIV-TV)	October 22–24, 2024	600 (LV)	± 4.0%	46%	42%	5% (Note: Solis-Mullen (L) with 2%)	7%
UMass Lowell/YouGov	October 16–24, 2024	600 (LV)	± 4.49%	48%	39%	5% (Note: "Another Candidate" with 2%; Solis-Mullen (L), Stein (C), and "Did Note Vote for Senator" with 1%)	8%
Quinnipiac University	October 17–21, 2024	1,136 (LV)	± 2.9%	52%	44%	2% (Note: "Refused" with 2%)	2%
The Trafalgar Group (R)	October 18–20, 2024	1,090 (LV)	± 2.9%	46%	45%	–	9%
Redfield & Wilton Strategies (Note: Poll sponsored by The Daily Telegraph)	October 16–18, 2024	1,008 (LV)	± 2.8%	45%	38%	7% (Note: "Won't vote if these are the candidates" with 2%; Dern (NL), Marsh (G), Solis-Mullen (L), and Stein (UST) with 1%; "Other" with 1%)	10%
AtlasIntel	October 12–17, 2024	1,529 (LV)	± 3.0%	48%	48%	2% (Note: "Blank/Null/Won't vote" with 1%; "Other" with 1%)	2%
The Bullfinch Group	October 11–17, 2024	600 (LV)	± 4.0%	51%	42%	–	7%
RMG Research (Note: Poll sponsored by Napolitan News)	October 10–16, 2024	789 (LV)	± 3.5%	48%	43%	4% (Note: "Some other candidate" and "Would not vote" with 2% each)	5%
RMG Research	October 10–16, 2024	789 (LV)	± 3.5%	49% (Note: With voters who lean towards a given candidate)	45%	1% (Note: "Wouldn't vote" with 1%)	4%
Morning Consult	October 6–15, 2024	496 (LV)	± 3.0%	48%	41%	–	11%
Mitchell Research	October 14, 2024	589 (LV)	± 4.0%	47%	43%	–	10%
Mitchell Research	October 14, 2024	589 (LV)	± 4.0%	45%	40%	4% (Note: Frizzell (I), (Note: Not appearing on ballot) Marsh (G), Solis-Mullen (L) & Stein (T) with 1%; Dern (NL) with 0%)	10%
Redfield & Wilton Strategies	October 12–14, 2024	682 (LV)	± 3.4%	44%	40%	6% (Note: "Won't vote if these are the candidates" with 3%, Marsh (G), Solis-Mullen (L), and Stein (UST) with 1%)	10%
SoCal Strategies (R)	October 11–13, 2024	692 (LV)	± 3.7%	48%	45%	–	7%
Marketing Resource Group (R)	October 7–11, 2024	600 (LV)	± 4.0%	46%	41%	7% (Note: Solis-Mullen (L) with 3%; Dern (NL), Marsh (G), and Stein (UST) with 1%; "Refused" with 1%)	6%
InsiderAdvantage (R)	October 8–9, 2024	800 (LV)	± 3.7%	46%	45%	2%	7%
Emerson College	October 5–8, 2024	950 (LV)	± 3.1%	49%	44%	–	8%
Fabrizio Ward (R)/ Impact Research (D) (Note: Poll sponsored by AARP)	October 2–8, 2024	600 (LV)	± 4.0%	49%	46%	1% (Note: "Other" with 1%)	4%
Research Co.	October 5–7, 2024	450 (LV)	± 4.6%	46%	41%	1% (Note: "Some other candidate" with 1%)	12%
Quinnipiac University	October 3–7, 2024	1,007 (LV)	± 3.1%	48%	48%	2% (Note: "Wouldn't vote" with 1%; "Refused" with 1%)	1%
Glengariff Group	October 1–4, 2024	600 (LV)	± 4.0%	47%	43%	5% (Note: Solis-Mullen (L) with 2%; Marsh (G) with 1%; Stein (C) with 1%; Dern (NLP) with 1%)	5%
Redfield & Wilton Strategies	September 27 – October 2, 2024	839 (LV)	± 3.1%	45%	39%	6% (Note: "Won't vote if these are the candidates" with 2%; Marsh (G) with 1%; Solis-Mullen (L) with 1%; Stein (C) with 1%; "Other" with 1%)	10%
Mitchell Research	September 30, 2024	709 (LV)	± 3.7%	49%	44%	–	7%
The Trafalgar Group (R)	September 28–30, 2024	1,086 (LV)	± 2.9%	47%	47%	–	6%
RMG Research	September 24–27, 2024	789 (LV)	± 3.5%	49%	43%	2% (Note: "Someone else" with 2%)	3%
New York Times/Siena College	September 21–26, 2024	688 (LV)	± 4.2%	47%	42%	–	12%
New York Times/Siena College	September 21–26, 2024	688 (RV)	± 4.0%	44%	40%	–	16%
AtlasIntel	September 20–25, 2024	918 (LV)	± 3.0%	44%	49%	1% (Note: "Blank/Null/Won't vote" with 1%; "Other" with <1%)	6%
BSG (R)/GS Strategy Group (D) (Note: Poll sponsored by The Cook Political Report)	September 19–25, 2024	416 (LV)	–	47%	44%	3% (Note: "Someone else" with 3%)	5%
BSG (R)/GS Strategy Group (D)	September 19–25, 2024	416 (LV)	–	50%	46%	–	4%
Remington Research Group (R) (Note: Poll sponsored by American Fuel & Petrochemical Manufacturers, a group that supports Republicans)	September 16–20, 2024	800 (LV)	± 3.5%	50%	43%	–	7%
Redfield & Wilton Strategies	September 16–19, 2024	993 (LV)	± 2.9%	46%	37%	4% (Note: Marsh (G) with 2%; "Won't vote" with 2%)	12%
Suffolk University	September 16–19, 2024	500 (LV)	± 4.4%	45%	43%	2% (Note: Marsh (G) and Solis-Mullen (L) with 1%; Stein (UST) and Dern (NL) with <1%)	10%
UMass/YouGov	September 11–19, 2024	650 (LV)	± 4.37%	47%	34%	3% (Note: Marsh (G), Solis-Mullen (L), and Dern (NL) with 1%)	15%
Emerson College	September 15–18, 2024	875 (LV)	± 3.2%	47%	42%	–	11%
Tarrance Group (R)	September 14–18, 2024	607 (LV)	± 4.1%	49%	47%	–	4%
Morning Consult	September 9–18, 2024	1,297 (LV)	± 3.0%	51%	37%	–	12%
Marist College	September 12–17, 2024	1,282 (RV)	± 3.2%	51%	45%	–	3%
Marist College	September 12–17, 2024	1,138 (LV)	± 3.4%	52%	45%	–	2%
Quinnipiac University	September 12–16, 2024	905 (LV)	± 3.3%	51%	46%	1%	2%
Redfield & Wilton Strategies	September 6–9, 2024	556 (LV)	± 3.8%	44%	39%	4% (Note: Solis-Mullen (L), Marsh (G), Stein (C), and Dern (NLP) with 1%)	14%
Morning Consult	August 30 – September 8, 2024	1,368 (LV)	± 3.0%	49%	40%	–	11%
co/efficient (R) (Note: Poll sponsored by Americans for IVF)	September 4–6, 2024	931 (LV)	± 3.3%	39%	38%	–	23%
CBS News/YouGov	September 3–6, 2024	1,073 (LV)	± 3.6%	48%	41%	2%	9%
ActiVote	August 6 – September 5, 2024	400 (LV)	± 4.9%	53%	47%	–	–
YouGov	August 23 – September 3, 2024	1,000 (RV)	± 3.7%	50%	39%	–	11%
Cygnal (R)	August 28 – September 1, 2024	600 (LV)	–	44%	43%	–	13%
The Trafalgar Group (R)	August 28–30, 2024	1,089 (LV)	± 2.9%	49%	45%	–	5%
Glengariff Group	August 26–29, 2024	600 (LV)	± 4.0%	44%	35%	6% (Note: Solis-Mullen (L) with 3%; Marsh (G) with 2%; Stein (C) with 1%; Dern (NLP) with 0%)	15%
CNN/SRSS	August 23–29, 2024	708 (LV)	± 4.9%	47%	41%	11% (Note: "Other" with 7%; "Neither" with 4%)	1%
Emerson College	August 25–28, 2024	800 (LV)	± 3.4%	47%	41%	–	12%
EPIC-MRA	August 23–26, 2024	600 (RV)	± 4.0%	46%	42%	–	12%
TIPP Insights (R) (Note: Poll sponsored by American Greatness)	August 20–22, 2024	1,001 (RV)	± 3.7%	47%	35%	5%	13%
TIPP Insights (R)	August 20–22, 2024	741 (LV)	± 3.7%	49%	39%	4%	8%
Fabrizio Ward (R) (Note: Poll sponsored by the Pinpoint Policy Institute)	August 19–21, 2024	400 (LV)	± 4.9%	43%	43%	–	14%
The Bullfinch Group (Note: Poll sponsored by the Independent Center)	August 8–11, 2024	500 (RV)	± 4.4%	48%	38%	–	15%
Fabrizio Ward (R)/ Impact Research (D)	August 7–11, 2024	600 (RV)	± 4.0%	47%	44%	–	8%
New York Times/Siena College	August 5–8, 2024	619 (RV)	± 4.5%	42%	41%	–	16%
New York Times/Siena College	August 5–8, 2024	619 (LV)	± 4.8%	46%	43%	–	11%
BSG (R)/GS Strategy Group (D)	July 26 – August 2, 2024	406 (LV)	–	50%	42%	–	8%
	August 6, 2024	Primary elections held					
Glengariff Group	July 22–24, 2024	600 (LV)	± 4.0%	46%	41%	–	13%
Fox News	July 22–24, 2024	1,012 (RV)	± 3.0%	51%	46%	1%	3%
Emerson College (Note: Poll sponsored by The Hill and Nexstar)	July 22–23, 2024	800 (RV)	± 3.4%	45%	41%	–	15%
Public Policy Polling (D) (Note: Poll sponsored by Clean and Prosperous America PAC, a group that supports Democrats)	July 17–18, 2024	650 (RV)	± 3.9%	46%	38%	–	17%
EPIC-MRA	July 13–17, 2024	600 (RV)	± 4.0%	43%	40%	–	17%
Public Policy Polling (D) (Note: Poll sponsored by the Progress Action Fund, which is a sponsor of the Democratic Party)	July 11–12, 2024	568 (RV)	–	45%	35%	–	20%
YouGov	July 4–12, 2024	1,000 (RV)	± 3.6%	48%	39%	2%	12%
YouGov	July 4–12, 2024	852 (LV)	–	49%	40%	2%	12%
Expedition Strategies (Note: Poll Sponsored by Progressive Policy Institute)	June 24 – July 8, 2024	275 (LV)	–	46%	40%	–	14%
Remington Research Group (R)	June 29 – July 1, 2024	584 (LV)	± 4.0%	47%	43%	–	10%
EPIC-MRA	June 21–26, 2024	600 (LV)	± 4.0%	44%	42%	–	14%
Emerson College	June 13–18, 2024	1,000 (RV)	± 3.0%	43%	39%	–	18%
Mitchell Research	June 3, 2024	697 (LV)	± 3.7%	36%	33%	–	31%
Mainstreet Research/FAU	May 30–31, 2024	723 (RV)	± 3.6%	41%	41%	4% (Note: "Another candidate" with 4%)	14%
Mainstreet Research/FAU	May 30–31, 2024	636 (LV)	± 3.6%	43%	42%	3% (Note: "Another candidate" with 3%)	12%
Mitchell Research	May 20–21, 2024	697 (LV)	± 3.7%	40%	36%	–	24%
KAConsulting (R) (Note: Poll sponsored by Vapor Technology Association)	May 15–19, 2024	600 (RV)	–	43%	37%	–	20%
Glengariff Group (Note: Poll sponsored by the Detroit Regional Chamber)	April 24–25, 2024	600 (RV)	± 4.0%	40%	37%	–	23%
Emerson College	April 25–29, 2024	1,000 (RV)	± 3.0%	42%	40%	–	19%
Emerson College	March 14–18, 2024	1,000 (RV)	± 3.0%	41%	39%	–	20%
Mitchell Research	March 15–16, 2024	627 (LV)	–	37%	37%	–	26%
EPIC-MRA	February 13–18, 2024	600 (LV)	± 4.0%	39%	38%	–	23%
Glengariff Group	January 2–6, 2024	600 (LV)	± 4.0%	38%	37%	–	25%
EPIC-MRA	November 10–16, 2023	600 (LV)	± 4.0%	39%	37%	–	24%
EPIC-MRA	August 6–11, 2023	600 (LV)	± 4.0%	42%	37%	–	21%
Emerson College	August 1–2, 2023	1,121 (LV)	± 2.9%	44%	38%	–	18%
Mitchell Research	July 11–13, 2023	639 (LV)	± 4.0%	44%	38%	–	17%

Hypothetical polling

Nasser Beydoun vs. Mike Rogers

Poll source	Date(s) administered	Sample size	Margin of error	Nasser Beydoun (D)	Mike Rogers (R)	Undecided
Glengariff Group	April 24–25, 2024	600 (RV)	± 4.0%	36%	39%	25%

Hill Harper vs. Mike Rogers

Poll source	Date(s) administered	Sample size	Margin of error	Hill Harper (D)	Mike Rogers (R)	Undecided
Glengariff Group	April 24–25, 2024	600 (RV)	± 4.0%	36%	38%	26%

Elissa Slotkin vs. Justin Amash

Poll source	Date(s) administered	Sample size	Margin of error	Elissa Slotkin (D)	Justin Amash (R)	Undecided
Glengariff Group	April 24–25, 2024	600 (RV)	± 4.0%	41%	34%	25%
Emerson College	March 14–18, 2024	1,000 (RV)	± 3.0%	43%	35%	22%

Elissa Slotkin vs. James Craig

Poll source	Date(s) administered	Sample size	Margin of error	Elissa Slotkin (D)	James Craig (R)	Undecided
Glengariff Group	January 2–6, 2024	600 (LV)	± 4.0%	36%	38%	27%
EPIC-MRA	November 10–16, 2023	600 (LV)	± 4.0%	40%	38%	22%
Emerson College	August 1–2, 2023	1,121 (LV)	± 2.9%	45%	38%	17%
EPIC-MRA	June 8–14, 2023	600 (LV)	± 4.0%	40%	39%	21%

Elissa Slotkin vs. Peter Meijer

Poll source	Date(s) administered	Sample size	Margin of error	Elissa Slotkin (D)	Peter Meijer (R)	Undecided
Glengariff Group	April 24–25, 2024	600 (RV)	± 4.0%	41%	34%	25%
Emerson College	March 14–18, 2024	1,000 (RV)	± 3.0%	42%	34%	24%
Glengariff Group	January 2–6, 2024	600 (LV)	± 4.0%	36%	36%	28%
Emerson College	August 1–2, 2023	1,121 (LV)	± 2.9%	42%	36%	22%
Mitchell Research	July 11–13, 2023	639 (LV)	± 4.0%	41%	28%	31%

Elissa Slotkin vs. Sandy Pensler

Poll source	Date(s) administered	Sample size	Margin of error	Elissa Slotkin (D)	Sandy Pensler (R)	Undecided
Glengariff Group	April 24–25, 2024	600 (RV)	± 4.0%	41%	34%	26%
Emerson College	March 14–18, 2024	1,000 (RV)	± 3.0%	42%	37%	21%

Elissa Slotkin vs. Nikki Snyder

Poll source	Date(s) administered	Sample size	Margin of error	Elissa Slotkin (D)	Nikki Snyder (R)	Undecided
Emerson College	August 1–2, 2023	1,121 (LV)	± 2.9%	44%	36%	20%

Elissa Slotkin vs. John Tuttle

Poll source	Date(s) administered	Sample size	Margin of error	Elissa Slotkin (D)	John Tuttle (R)	Undecided
Emerson College	August 1–2, 2023	1,121 (LV)	± 2.9%	45%	35%	20%

=== Results ===
2024 United States Senate election in Michigan
Party	Candidate	Votes	%	±%
Democratic	Elissa Slotkin	2,712,686	48.64%	−3.62%
Republican	Mike Rogers	2,693,680	48.30%	+2.54%
Libertarian	Joseph Solis-Mullen	56,697	1.02%	N/A
Green	Douglas Marsh	53,978	0.97%	+0.02%
U.S. Taxpayers'	Dave Stein	41,363	0.74%	+0.09%
Natural Law	Doug Dern	18,779	0.34%	−0.05%
Total votes		5,577,183	100.0%	
Democratic hold				

==== By county ====
County	Elissa Slotkin Democratic		Mike Rogers Republican		Various candidates Other parties		Margin		Total votes cast
County	#	%	#	%	#	%	#	%	Total votes cast
Alcona	2,133	28.95%	5,048	68.52%	186	2.52%	-2,915	-39.57%	7,367
Alger	2,047	39.69%	3,002	58.20%	109	2.11%	-955	-18.51%	5,158
Allegan	25,193	35.30%	44,205	61.94%	1,972	2.76%	-19,012	-26.64%	71,370
Alpena	5,827	34.53%	10,567	62.61%	483	2.86%	-4,740	-28.08%	16,877
Antrim	6,178	36.92%	10,136	60.58%	418	2.50%	-3,958	-23.66%	16,732
Arenac	2,786	31.17%	5,911	66.13%	241	2.70%	-3,125	-34.96%	8,938
Baraga	1,468	34.57%	2,698	63.54%	80	1.88%	-1,230	-28.97%	4,246
Barry	12,311	32.29%	24,678	64.72%	1,143	3.00%	-12,367	-32.43%	38,132
Bay	26,313	43.74%	32,145	53.44%	1,693	2.81%	-5,832	-9.70%	60,151
Benzie	5,659	44.42%	6,742	52.92%	338	2.65%	-1,083	-8.50%	12,739
Berrien	35,983	43.27%	44,819	53.89%	2,358	2.84%	-8,836	-10.62%	83,160
Branch	5,923	28.49%	14,181	68.20%	688	3.31%	-8,258	-39.71%	20,792
Calhoun	28,321	42.14%	36,586	54.44%	2,295	3.42%	-8,265	-12.30%	67,202
Cass	8,584	31.31%	18,127	66.12%	704	2.57%	-9,543	-34.81%	27,415
Charlevoix	6,979	40.15%	9,930	57.12%	475	2.73%	-2,951	-16.97%	17,384
Cheboygan	5,445	33.69%	10,259	63.47%	460	2.85%	-4,814	-29.78%	16,164
Chippewa	6,689	37.13%	10,751	59.68%	573	3.18%	-4,062	-22.55%	18,013
Clare	5,285	31.10%	11,146	65.59%	562	3.31%	-5,861	-34.49%	16,993
Clinton	22,600	46.06%	25,903	52.79%	562	1.15%	-3,303	-6.73%	49,545
Crawford	2,696	32.36%	5,360	64.34%	275	3.30%	-2,664	-31.98%	8,331
Delta	7,316	34.06%	13,601	63.33%	561	2.61%	-6,285	-29.27%	21,478
Dickinson	4,662	30.87%	10,076	66.72%	364	2.41%	-5,414	-35.85%	15,102
Eaton	31,453	48.67%	31,627	48.94%	1,549	2.40%	-174	-0.27%	64,629
Emmet	9,778	43.14%	12,301	54.27%	589	2.60%	-2,523	-11.13%	22,668
Genesee	114,995	52.40%	97,999	44.65%	6,465	2.95%	16,996	7.75%	219,459
Gladwin	4,537	29.86%	10,239	67.39%	417	2.74%	-5,702	-37.53%	15,193
Gogebic	3,250	40.37%	4,536	56.35%	264	3.28%	-1,286	-15.98%	8,050
Grand Traverse	29,487	47.54%	30,865	49.76%	1,670	2.69%	-1,378	-2.22%	62,022
Gratiot	6,648	34.07%	12,281	62.95%	581	2.98%	-5,633	-28.88%	19,510
Hillsdale	5,924	24.27%	17,792	72.90%	689	2.82%	-11,868	-48.63%	24,405
Houghton	7,650	40.00%	10,993	57.48%	483	2.53%	-3,343	-17.48%	19,126
Huron	5,541	29.87%	12,509	67.43%	500	2.70%	-6,968	-37.56%	18,550
Ingham	94,679	64.49%	48,083	32.75%	4,054	2.76%	46,596	31.74%	146,816
Ionia	11,253	33.54%	21,241	63.31%	1,059	3.16%	-9,988	-29.77%	33,553
Iosco	5,402	35.03%	9,546	61.89%	475	3.08%	-4,144	-26.86%	15,423
Iron	2,404	34.82%	4,328	62.69%	172	2.49%	-1,924	-27.87%	6,904
Isabella	13,728	45.37%	15,569	51.46%	959	3.17%	-1,841	-6.09%	30,256
Jackson	32,200	39.08%	47,562	57.72%	2,643	3.21%	-15,362	-18.64%	82,405
Kalamazoo	81,996	56.97%	57,478	39.93%	4,460	3.10%	24,518	17.04%	143,934
Kalkaska	3,150	27.84%	7,757	68.56%	408	3.61%	-4,607	-40.72%	11,315
Kent	187,509	50.93%	170,388	46.28%	10,261	2.79%	17,121	4.65%	368,158
Keweenaw	665	41.96%	882	55.65%	38	2.40%	-217	-13.69%	1,585
Lake	2,250	33.25%	4,257	62.91%	260	3.84%	-2,007	-29.66%	6,767
Lapeer	16,651	30.47%	36,578	66.93%	1,426	2.61%	-19,927	-36.46%	54,655
Leelanau	9,164	52.20%	8,102	46.15%	289	1.65%	1,062	6.05%	17,555
Lenawee	19,772	36.76%	32,385	60.21%	1,627	3.03%	-12,613	-23.45%	53,784
Livingston	50,533	38.50%	78,193	59.57%	2,526	1.92%	-27,660	-21.07%	131,252
Luce	771	26.17%	2,096	71.15%	79	2.68%	-1,325	-44.98%	2,946
Mackinac	2,613	36.78%	4,326	60.90%	165	2.32%	-1,713	-24.12%	7,104
Macomb	217,665	43.64%	265,883	53.31%	15,176	3.04%	-48,218	-9.67%	498,724
Manistee	6,177	40.84%	8,491	56.14%	457	3.02%	-2,314	-15.30%	15,125
Marquette	20,548	53.53%	16,915	44.06%	926	2.41%	3,633	9.47%	38,389
Mason	6,739	37.74%	10,613	59.43%	505	2.83%	-3,874	-21.69%	17,857
Mecosta	7,462	33.68%	13,950	62.95%	747	3.37%	-6,488	-29.28%	22,159
Menominee	4,041	31.81%	8,332	65.59%	330	2.60%	-4,291	-33.78%	12,703
Midland	20,666	41.66%	27,605	55.65%	1,330	2.68%	-6,939	-13.99%	49,601
Missaukee	1,934	21.45%	6,828	75.72%	256	2.84%	-4,894	-54.27%	9,018
Monroe	32,420	36.44%	54,082	60.79%	2,460	2.77%	-21,662	-24.35%	88,962
Montcalm	10,270	29.92%	22,944	66.84%	1,114	3.25%	-12,674	-36.92%	34,328
Montmorency	1,654	26.38%	4,455	71.04%	162	2.58%	-2,801	-44.66%	6,271
Muskegon	45,182	48.36%	45,231	48.41%	3,025	3.24%	-49	-0.05%	93,438
Newaygo	8,066	27.97%	19,932	69.12%	839	2.91%	-11,866	-41.15%	28,837
Oakland	418,749	54.85%	325,903	42.69%	18,802	2.46%	92,846	12.16%	763,454
Oceana	5,066	34.57%	9,168	62.57%	419	2.86%	-4,102	-28.00%	14,653
Ogemaw	3,684	29.92%	8,312	67.52%	315	2.56%	-4,628	-37.60%	12,311
Ontonagon	1,279	33.89%	2,387	63.25%	108	2.86%	-1,108	-29.36%	3,774
Osceola	3,281	25.22%	9,291	71.43%	436	3.35%	-6,010	-46.21%	13,008
Oscoda	1,388	27.37%	3,500	69.01%	184	3.63%	-2,112	-41.64%	5,072
Otsego	4,978	31.63%	10,323	65.59%	438	2.78%	-5,345	-33.96%	15,739
Ottawa	67,389	38.05%	105,708	59.69%	3,995	2.26%	-38,319	-21.64%	177,092
Presque Isle	2,992	34.77%	5,391	62.64%	223	2.59%	-2,399	-27.87%	8,606
Roscommon	5,254	33.17%	10,115	63.85%	472	2.98%	-4,861	-30.68%	15,841
Saginaw	49,668	48.73%	49,659	48.72%	2,609	2.56%	9	0.01%	101,936
Sanilac	6,056	26.32%	16,306	70.87%	645	2.80%	-10,250	-44.55%	23,007
Schoolcraft	1,629	33.98%	3,032	63.25%	133	2.77%	-1,403	-29.27%	4,794
Shiawassee	15,476	38.59%	23,505	58.61%	1,122	2.80%	-8,029	-20.02%	40,103
St. Clair	31,519	33.38%	59,992	63.53%	2,921	3.09%	-28,473	-30.15%	94,432
St. Joseph	9,195	31.97%	18,545	64.48%	1,022	3.55%	-9,350	-32.51%	28,762
Tuscola	8,754	29.04%	20,503	68.03%	883	2.93%	-11,749	-38.99%	30,140
Van Buren	16,798	41.38%	22,570	55.60%	1,228	3.02%	-5,772	-14.22%	40,596
Washtenaw	154,214	70.40%	58,207	26.57%	6,648	3.03%	96,007	43.83%	219,069
Wayne	532,029	63.42%	267,761	31.92%	39,069	4.66%	264,268	31.50%	838,859
Wexford	6,063	31.56%	12,457	64.83%	694	3.61%	-6,394	-33.28%	19,214
Totals	2,712,686	48.64%	2,693,680	48.30%	170,821	3.06%	19,006	0.34%	5,577,187

==== Counties that flipped from Democratic to Republican ====
- Eaton (largest city: Charlotte)
- Gogebic (largest city: Ironwood)
- Isabella (largest city: Mount Pleasant)
- Macomb (largest city: Warren)
- Muskegon (largest city: Muskegon)

==== By congressional district ====
Slotkin won seven of 13 congressional districts, including her own district, which elected a Republican to replace her.

District	Slotkin	Rogers	Representative
1st	39%	59%	Jack Bergman
2nd	34%	63%	John Moolenaar
3rd	52%	45%	Hillary Scholten
4th	46%	52%	Bill Huizenga
5th	36%	61%	Tim Walberg
6th	60%	36%	Debbie Dingell
7th	49%	48%	Elissa Slotkin (118th Congress)
7th	49%	48%	Tom Barrett (119th Congress)
8th	49%	48%	Dan Kildee (118th Congress)
8th	49%	48%	Kristen McDonald Rivet (119th Congress)
9th	35%	63%	Lisa McClain
10th	47%	50%	John James
11th	57%	40%	Haley Stevens
12th	68%	27%	Rashida Tlaib
13th	70%	27%	Shri Thanedar

==== Voter demographics ====
CNN conducted an exit poll in Michigan for both the U.S. senate race and concurrent presidential race. They surveyed 2,751 voters across the state.

2024 U.S. Senate election in Michigan voter demographics (CNN)
Demographic subgroup	Slotkin	Rogers	% of total vote
Ideology
Liberals	90	6	25
Moderates	60	38	41
Conservatives	8	90	35
Party
Democrats	94	4	31
Republicans	6	93	34
Independents	51	44	35
Gender
Men	43	53	45
Women	53	44	55
Race
White	44	53	78
Black	85	12	11
Latino	40	51	6
Asian	N/A	N/A	1
All other races	40	50	3
Education
Never attended college	32	66	16
Some college	54	44	29
Associate degree	39	54	17
Bachelor's degree	53	44	21
Advanced degree	59	39	17
Gender by race
White men	39	58	35
White women	49	49	44
Black men	79	18	5
Black women	88	8	7
Latino men	N/A	N/A	3
Latina women	N/A	N/A	3
All other races	43	50	4
Area type
Urban	65	30	21
Suburban	46	51	58
Rural	40	58	21
Income
<$30,000	53	44	11
$30,000–$49,999	51	44	17
$50,000–$99,999	49	50	31
$100,000–$199,999	47	50	30
≥$200,000	46	53	11
Most important issue
Democracy	80	18	34
Economy	23	73	27
Abortion	63	36	17
Immigration	4	94	12
Foreign policy	N/A	N/A	4
Biden job approval
Strongly approve	98	2	17
Somewhat approve	89	6	24
Somewhat disapprove	56	37	11
Strongly disapprove	7	90	46
Abortion should be:
Legal in all cases	85	13	33
Legal in most cases	49	47	35
Illegal in most cases	10	88	24
Illegal in all cases	N/A	N/A	5
Democracy in the United States is:
Very threatened	48	49	34
Somewhat threatened	47	52	37
Somewhat secure	56	42	20
Very secure	39	53	7
First time voting?
Yes	N/A	N/A	5
No	49	48	95
U.S. support for Israel is:
Too strong	63	33	29
Not strong enough	17	80	27
About right	59	39	37
Union household?
Yes	58	37	23
No	45	53	77
Gretchen Whitmer job approval
Approve	87	11	49
Disapprove	7	89	48

== Notes ==
Partisan clients
