= Nasser Beydoun =

American business executive

Personal details
- Born: 1964 or 1965 (age 61–62) Beirut, Lebanon
- Party: Democratic
- Spouse: {{ubl |Maysa Balbaki (divorced)
- Children: 3
- Education: University of San Diego (BBA, MBA)

Nasser Beydoun (born 1964/1965) is an American business executive and political candidate. He is the former chief executive officer of the Qatar-based Wataniya Restaurants group. Beydoun was the executive director of the Arab American Chamber of Commerce and chair of the Arab American Civil Rights League. He was the first Arab American liaison to the Arab League.

Beydoun was a Democratic Party candidate in the 2024 United States Senate election in Michigan. His nominating petitions were rejected on May 31, 2024, by the Michigan Board of State Canvassers because he used a P.O. Box as his address on the petitions, instead of his legal street address. The Michigan Court of Appeals rejected his appeal of the Board of State Canvassers on June 7, 2024.

== Early life ==
Beydoun was born in Beirut, Lebanon, to Najla and Mohamed Beydoun. His family was from Bint Jbeil and his grandfather represented the town in the Parliament of Lebanon. Beydoun's great-grandfather had already immigrated to the United States and worked for Ford Motor Company in Highland Park, Michigan. Beydoun's grandfather remained in Lebanon, but his father immigrated to Detroit in 1969 when Beydoun was five years old. Mohamed worked at Ford and raised six children.

== Education ==
In 1987, he moved to California. Beydoun completed bachelor's and master's degrees in business administration at the University of San Diego. He tried opening several business, including a tortilla factory. He returned to Michigan in 1999, and in 2000 became the executive director of the Arab American Chamber of Commerce. In 2001, he was appointed by Amr Moussa as the first Arab American liaison to the Arab League.

== Career ==
By 2005, he was a construction company executive based in Wayne County, Michigan. In 2005, he considered running as a Republican candidate in the 2006 United States Senate election in Michigan. He has a history of political donations to both Republican and Democratic officeholders. In 2007, he was hired by Wataniya Restaurants group as its chief executive officer and moved to Qatar. He worked on expanding outlets of Caribou Coffee, Rainforest Cafe, and Sbarro in Qatar, Dubai, and Egypt. He resigned in November 2009. He was later stuck in the country for 15 months after his employer and sponsor denied his exit permit.

Beydoun has served as chair of the Arab American Civil Rights League. He is a former trustee of the Henry Ford College Foundation. Beydoun was co-chair of BRIDGES, a federal law enforcement partnership with the Arab American and Middle Eastern communities in Metro Detroit.

In December 2022, Beydoun established an exploratory committee ahead of the 2024 United States Senate election in Michigan. He formally announced his candidacy in April 2023.

In November 2023, Beydoun alleged that former Michigan Democratic Party chair Lon Johnson had approached him with an offer of $20 million from a pro-Israel lobbying group to drop out of the Senate race and launch a primary challenge against United States Representative Rashida Tlaib despite Beydoun's publicly pro-Palestinian stance. Johnson repeatedly denied the claims, saying, "that's just crazy. I didn't offer him $20 million, or any other amount of money, to run against Rashida. That's insane."

== Personal life ==
Beydoun married Maysa Beydoun, a Canadian of Lebanese descent, with whom he has three children.
