= Arab American Chamber of Commerce =

- Abbreviation: AACC
- Type: Non-stock corporation

The Arab American Chamber of Commerce, commonly known as AACC, is Non-stock corporation based in Washington D.C. The Chamber was established to advocate for the U.S. economy by furthering the trade surplus with the Middle East and North Africa. It aims to enable U.S. businessmen to benefit from the growing demands of Arab consumers and assists them in widening their trade area and exploring new markets. Furthermore, the AACC works as a Conflict Resolution Committee that arbitrates commercial disputes between Arab importers and American corporations.

The Arab American Chamber of Commerce is a federal trademark, registered on 4/11/2000 under registration number 2339971, to promote U.S. businesses and tourism in the Arab world.

== List of members ==
- Nasser Beydoun, former executive director
