= 2026 United States House of Representatives elections in Michigan =

- November 3, 2026

All 13 Michigan seats to the United States House of Representatives
	Majority party	Minority party
Party	Democratic	Republican
Last election	6	7
Seats won	9	4
Seat change	▲3	▼3
Popular vote	2,533,206	2,108,972
Percentage	53.39%	44.45%
Swing	▲5.42%	▼4.30%

Democratic hold Democratic gain
Republican hold
Democratic
40–50%
50–60%
60–70%
70–80%
Republican
40–50%
50–60%
60–70%
70–80%

The 2026 United States House of Representatives elections in Michigan were held on November 3, 2026, to elect the 13 U.S. representatives from the state of Michigan, one from all the state's congressional districts. The elections coincided with other elections to the House of Representatives, elections to the United States Senate, and various state and local elections. The primary elections took place on August 4, 2026. The filing deadline to run for the August 4 primary was April 21.

== Statewide polling ==
=== Statewide congressional polls ===
Poll source	Date(s) administered	Sample size (Note: Key: A – all adults RV – registered voters LV – likely voters V – unclear)	Margin of error	Democratic	Republican	Other	Undecided
Marist University	October 15–18, 2026	(LV)	± 4.3%	52%	46%	2% (Note: "Another party's candidate" & "No response" with 1%)	1%
Marist University	October 15–18, 2026	1,185 (RV)	± 4.0%	54%	44%	2% (Note: "Another party's candidate" & "No response" with 1%)	1%
Torchlight Strategies (R) (Note: Poll sponsored by Common Sense for America PAC, which supports Republicans)	September 15–19, 2026	643 (LV)	± 4.7%	46%	46%	18%	

== District 1 ==
2026 Michigan's 1st congressional district election
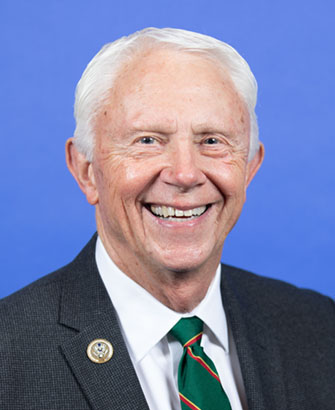

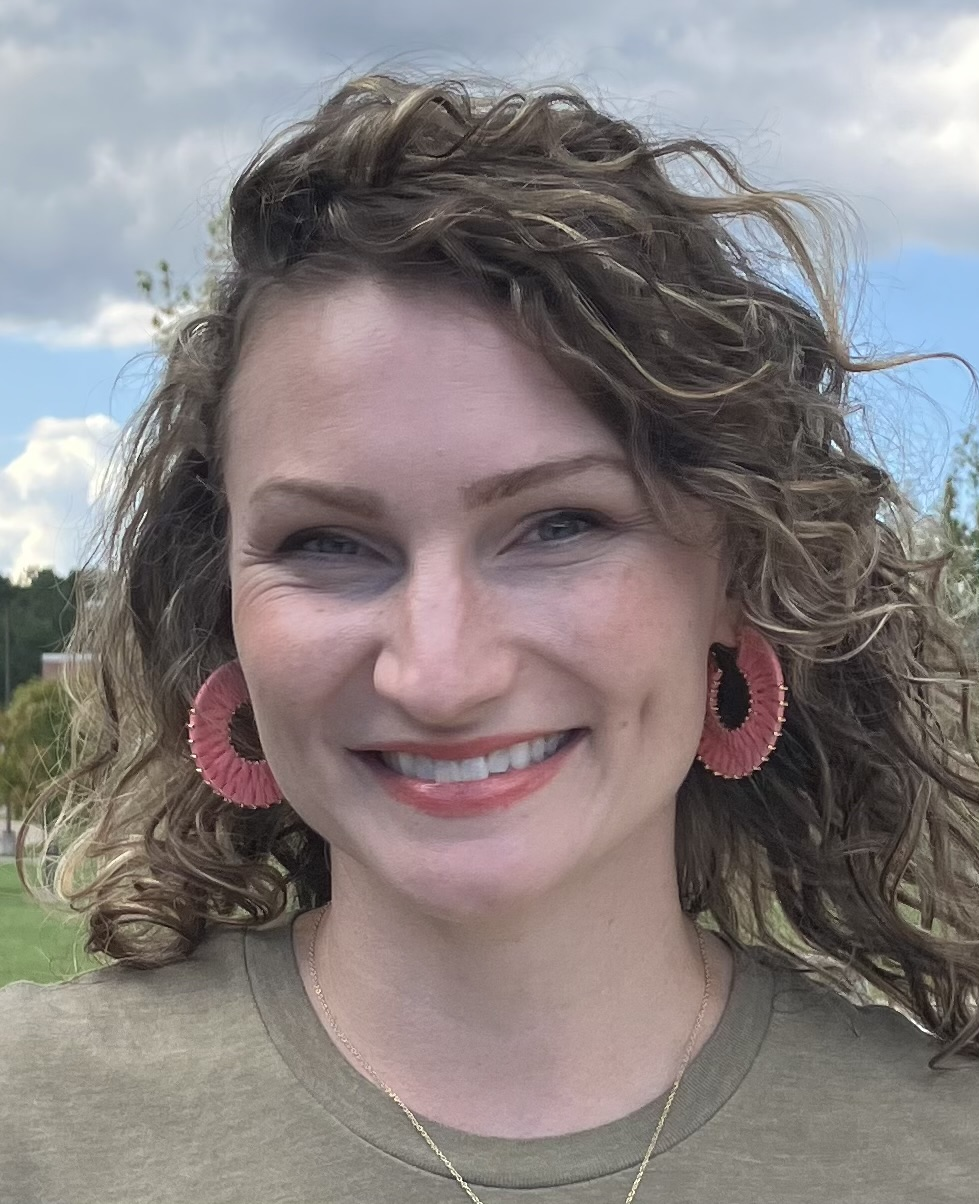
Nominee	Jack Bergman	Callie Barr
Party	Republican	Democratic
Popular vote	217,741	179,114
Percentage	53.8%	44.2%
- County results Bergman: 40–50% 50–60% 60–70% 70–80% Barr: 50–60% 60–70%
U.S. representative before election
Jack Bergman
Republican
Elected U.S. representative
Jack Bergman
Republican

The 1st district covers the Upper Peninsula and the northern part of the Lower Peninsula, including Alpena and Traverse City. The incumbent is Republican Jack Bergman, who was re-elected with 59.1% of the vote in 2024.

=== Republican primary ===
==== Nominee ====
- Jack Bergman, incumbent U.S. representative (2017–present)

==== Eliminated in primary ====
- Matthew DenOtter, realtor and candidate for the 11th district in 2022
- Justin Michal, military researcher

==== Endorsements ====
Jack Bergman

Executive branch officials

- Donald Trump, 45th and 47th president of the United States (2017–2021, 2025–present)

State legislators

- ~~Karl Bohnak, HD-109 (2025–present)~~ (endorsement rescinded)
- ~~Gregory Markkanen, HD-110 (2019–present)~~ (endorsement rescinded)
- ~~Ed McBroom, SD-38 (2019–present)~~ (endorsement rescinded)
- ~~David Prestin, HD-108 (2023–present)~~ (endorsement rescinded)

Organizations

- AIPAC
- Detroit Regional Chamber PAC
- U.S. Chamber of Commerce

Newspapers

- The Detroit News (Republican primary only)

==== Fundraising ====
Campaign finance reports as of July 15, 2026
Candidate	Raised	Spent	Cash on hand
Jack Bergman (R)	$1,917,574	$1,368,360	$660,163
Matthew DenOtter (R)	$1,906,389 (Note: $1,877,175 of this total has been self-funded by DenOtter)	$1,820,958	$145,079
Justin Michal (R)	$59,774	$50,828	$8,945
Source: Federal Election Commission

==== Results ====
Republican primary results
Party	Candidate	Votes	%
Republican	Jack Bergman (incumbent)	80,726	74.33
Republican	Matthew DenOtter	14,254	13.12
Republican	Justin Michal	13,627	12.55
Total votes		108,607	100.0

=== Democratic primary ===
==== Nominee ====
- Callie Barr, lawyer and nominee for this district in 2024

==== Eliminated in primary ====
- Kyle Blomquist, Iron Mountain city councilor
- Wayne Stiles, industrial designer

==== Endorsements ====
Callie Barr

Executive branch officials

- Pete Buttigieg, former secretary of transportation (2021–2025)

U.S. representatives

- Bart Stupak, former MI-01 (1993–2011)

Labor unions

- Michigan AFL-CIO
- Michigan Education Association

Organizations

- National Women's Political Caucus
Kyle Blomquist

Organizations

- CAIR Action
- Michigan Democratic Party Progressive Caucus
- Northwest Michigan Democratic Socialists of America
- Track AIPAC
Wayne Stiles

Organizations

- Vote Common Good

Newspapers

- The Detroit News (Democratic primary only)

==== Fundraising ====
Campaign finance reports as of July 15, 2026
Candidate	Raised	Spent	Cash on hand
Callie Barr (D)	$824,340	$301,256	$530,724
Kyle Blomquist (D)	$245,024	$172,237	$72,786
Wayne Stiles (D)	$53,612 (Note: $10,000 of this total has been self-funded by Stiles)	$51,186	$2,426
Source: Federal Election Commission

==== Results ====
Results by county Barr: 40–50%; 50–60%; 60–70%; 70–80%; Blomquist: 50–60%; Stiles: 50–60%

Democratic primary
Party	Candidate	Votes	%
Democratic	Callie Barr	62,197	58.49
Democratic	Kyle Blomquist	37,936	35.67
Democratic	Wayne Stiles	6,213	5.84
Total votes		106,346	100.0

=== General election ===
==== Predictions ====
Source	Ranking	As of
Decision Desk HQ	Likely R	September 25, 2026
The Cook Political Report	Solid R	May 13, 2026
Inside Elections	Solid R	May 21, 2026
Sabato's Crystal Ball	Likely R	November 2, 2026
The Economist (Note: This forecast uses the terms "Likely" and "Very Likely" the same way the other forecasts use the terms "Lean" and "Likely". To avoid confusion, and for the purposes of equivalency, the terms "Likely" and "Very Likely" will be changed to "Lean" and "Likely" for the purposes of this page. As well, "tossup" is labeled "uncertain", but for the purposes of this page, it will be labelled "tossup".)	Likely R	July 30, 2026

==== Post-primary endorsements ====
Jack Bergman (R)

Newspapers

- The Detroit News
Callie Barr (D)

Labor unions

- American Federation of Government Employees
- National Education Association

Organizations

- EMILYs List
- End Citizens United
- Reproductive Freedom for All
- VoteVets

==== Fundraising ====
Campaign finance reports as of October 14, 2026
Candidate	Raised	Spent	Cash on hand
Jack Bergman (R)	$2,417,376	$2,265,237	$263,088
Callie Barr (D)	$1,724,591	$1,348,497	$383,735
Source: Federal Election Commission

==== Results ====
2026 Michigan's 1st congressional district election results
Party	Candidate	Votes	%	±%
Republican	Jack Bergman (incumbent)	217,741	53.78	−5.32
Democratic	Callie Barr	179,114	44.23	+6.32
Libertarian	Arnett Satterla	2,765	0.68	−0.52
Working Class	Liz Hakola	2,391	0.59	−1.21
U.S. Taxpayers	Doc Kovaly	1,232	0.30	+0.30
Green	LaVeta Davenport	777	0.19	+0.19
Independent	Zebulon Featherly	924	0.23	+0.23
Total votes		404,944	100.0	
Republican hold				

== District 2 ==
2026 Michigan's 2nd congressional district election
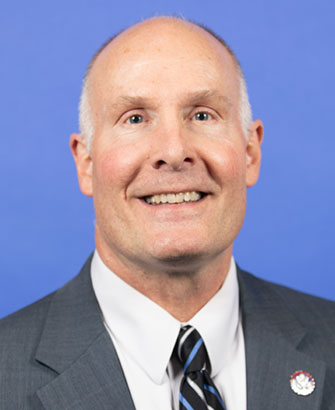

Nominee	John Moolenaar	Benjamin Ambrose
Party	Republican	Democratic
Popular vote	220,696	132,695
Percentage	61.5%	37.0
- County results Moolenaar: 40–50% 50–60% 60–70% 70–80%
U.S. representative before election
John Moolenaar
Republican
Elected U.S. representative
John Moolenaar
Republican

The 2nd district covers most of central Michigan including some of the outer Grand Rapids metropolitan area. The incumbent is Republican John Moolenaar, who was re-elected with 65.1% of the vote in 2024.

=== Republican primary ===
==== Nominee ====
- John Moolenaar, incumbent U.S. representative (2015–present)

==== Endorsements ====
John Moolenaar

Executive branch officials

- Donald Trump, 45th and 47th president of the United States (2017–2021, 2025–present)

Organizations

- AIPAC
- Detroit Regional Chamber PAC

==== Results ====
Republican primary results
Party	Candidate	Votes	%
Republican	John Moolenaar (incumbent)	93,751	100.0
Total votes		93,751	100.0

==== Fundraising ====
Campaign finance reports as of July 15, 2026
Candidate	Raised	Spent	Cash on hand
John Moolenaar (R)	$1,652,234	$1,028,617	$1,905,561
Source: Federal Election Commission

=== Democratic primary ===
==== Nominee ====
- Benjamin Ambrose, marketing executive

==== Eliminated in primary ====
- Jamie Hill, physician assistant
- Clyde Welford, Lake County commissioner

==== Withdrawn ====
- Richard Carrizales, project manager and engineer
- Michael Lynch, marketing director and nominee for this district in 2024

==== Endorsements ====
Ben Ambrose

Newspapers

- The Detroit News (Democratic primary only)

==== Fundraising ====
Italics indicate a withdrawn candidate

Campaign finance reports as of July 15, 2026
Candidate	Raised	Spent	Cash on hand
Benjamin Ambrose (D)	$85,093	$62,839	$21,867
Richard Carrizales (D)	$263	$179	$83
Jamie Hill (D)	$16,442 (Note: $3,111 was self-funded by Hill)	$7,727	$6,737
Michael Lynch (D)	$300	$4,628	$0
Source: Federal Election Commission

==== Results ====
Democratic primary
Party	Candidate	Votes	%
Democratic	Benjamin Ambrose	32,445	44.32
Democratic	Jamie Hill	30,948	42.28
Democratic	Clyde Welford	9,806	13.40
Total votes		73,199	100.0

=== General election ===
==== Predictions ====
Source	Ranking	As of
Decision Desk HQ	Safe R	July 14, 2026
The Cook Political Report	Solid R	May 13, 2026
Inside Elections	Solid R	May 21, 2026
Sabato's Crystal Ball	Safe R	May 26, 2026
The Economist	Safe R	May 22, 2026

==== Post-primary endorsements ====
John Moolenaar (R)

Newspapers

- The Detroit News
Ben Ambrose (D)

Labor unions

- American Federation of Government Employees
- United Food and Commercial Workers Local 951

==== Fundraising ====
Campaign finance reports as of October 14, 2026
Candidate	Raised	Spent	Cash on hand
John Moolenaar (R)	$2,068,418	$2,137,063	$1,213,299
Benjamin Ambrose (D)	$186,503	$153,160	$32,956
Source: Federal Election Commission

2026 Michigan's 2nd congressional district election results
Party	Candidate	Votes	%	±%
Republican	John Moolenaar (incumbent)	220,696	61.47	−4.44
Democratic	Benjamin Ambrose	132,695	36.97	+5.27
Green	Charlotte Magoon	3,859	1.07	+1.07
Natural Law	Richard Sills	1,764	0.49	+0.49
Total votes		359,014	100.0	
Republican hold				

== District 3 ==
2026 Michigan's 3rd congressional district election
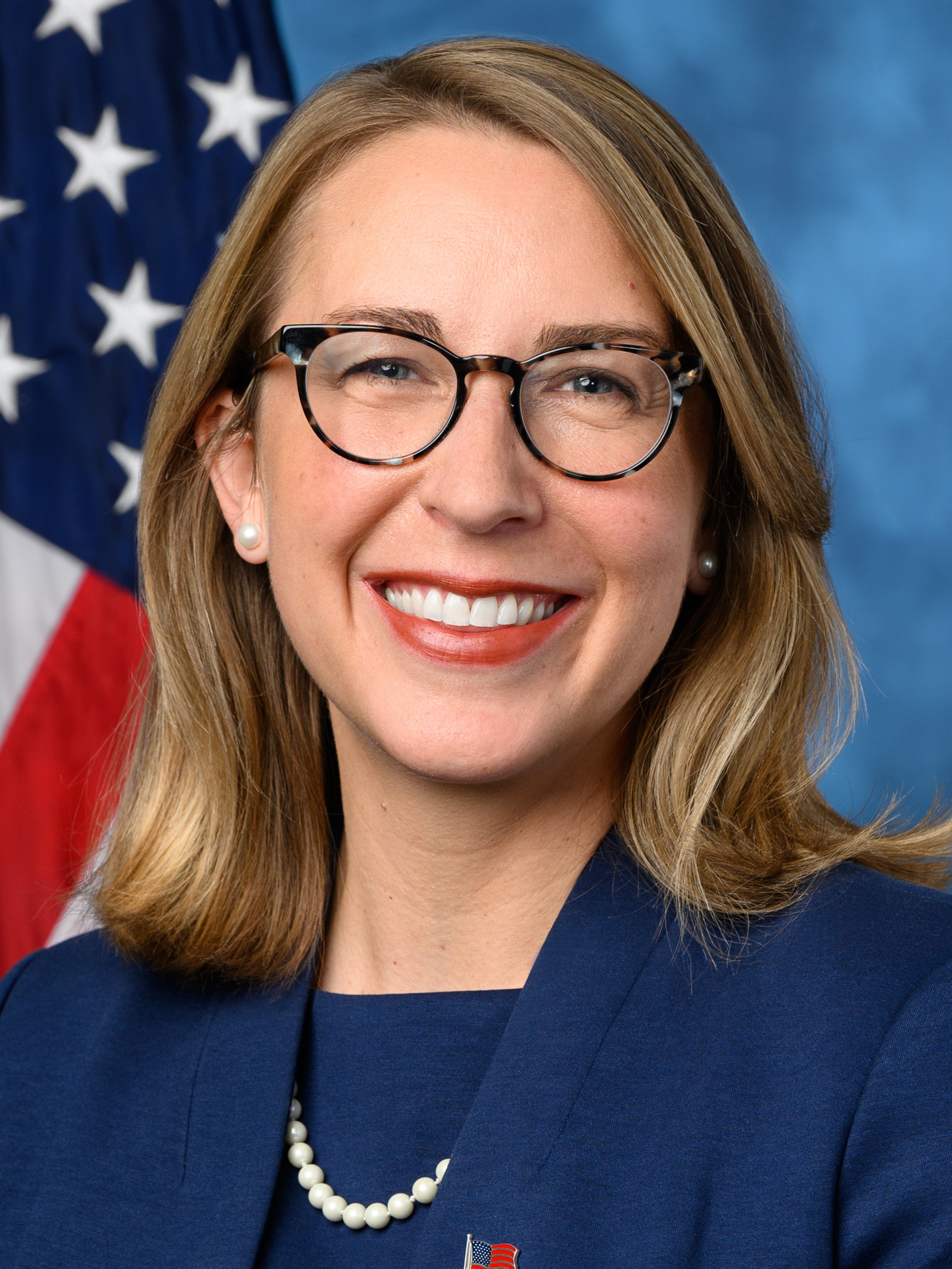

Nominee	Hillary Scholten	Terri DeBoer
Party	Democratic	Republican
Popular vote	211,664	153,247
Percentage	57.1%	41.4%
- County results Scholten: 50–60% DeBoer: 50–60%
U.S. representative before election
Hillary Scholten
Democratic
Elected U.S. representative
Hillary Scholten
Democratic

The 3rd district is based in western Michigan, and includes Grand Rapids, Muskegon, and parts of Ottawa County. The incumbent is Democrat Hillary Scholten, who was re-elected with 53.7% of the vote in 2024.

=== Democratic primary ===
==== Nominee ====
- Hillary Scholten, incumbent U.S. representative (2023–present)

==== Fundraising ====
Campaign finance reports as of July 15, 2026
Candidate	Raised	Spent	Cash on hand
Hillary Scholten (D)	$2,329,122	$1,322,263	$1,356,572
Source: Federal Election Commission

==== Endorsements ====
Hillary Scholten

Labor unions

- Michigan Education Association

Organizations

- AIPAC
- Black Economic Alliance PAC
- Democratic Majority for Israel
- J Street
- Jewish Democratic Council of America
- Joint Action Committee for Political Affairs
- National Women's Political Caucus
- Planned Parenthood Action Fund
- Sierra Club
- Vote Mama

==== Results ====
Democratic primary results
Party	Candidate	Votes	%
Democratic	Hillary Scholten (incumbent)	112,189	100.0
Total votes		112,189	100.0

=== Republican primary ===
==== Nominee ====
- Terri DeBoer, meteorologist

==== Eliminated in primary ====
- Ryan Cushman, businessman

==== Withdrawn ====
- Michael Markey Jr., financial advisor, candidate for governor in 2022, and candidate for this district in 2024 (ran for state senate)

==== Endorsements ====
Terri DeBoer

Newspapers

- The Detroit News (Republican primary only)

==== Fundraising ====
Italics indicate a withdrawn candidate.

Campaign finance reports as of July 15, 2026
Candidate	Raised	Spent	Cash on hand
Ryan Cushman (R)	$116,383 (Note: $113,926 of this total has been self-funded by Cushman)	$115,110	$1,273
Terri DeBoer (R)	$551,696	$190,341	$361,354
Michael Markey Jr. (R)	$0	$3,127	$0
Source: Federal Election Commission

==== Results ====
Republican primary results
Party	Candidate	Votes	%
Republican	Terri DeBoer	54,241	78.56
Republican	Ryan Cushman	14,804	21.44
Total votes		69,045	100.0

=== General election ===
==== Predictions ====
Source	Ranking	As of
Decision Desk HQ	Safe D	August 7, 2026
The Cook Political Report	Solid D	May 13, 2026
Inside Elections	Likely D	May 21, 2026
Sabato's Crystal Ball	Safe D	May 26, 2026
The Economist	Safe D	May 22, 2026
Silver Bulletin	Solid D	August 14, 2026

==== Post-primary endorsements ====
Terri DeBoer (R)

Newspapers

- The Detroit News
Hillary Scholten (D)

Labor unions

- American Federation of Government Employees
- Michigan AFL-CIO
- National Education Association

Organizations

- Detroit Regional Chamber PAC

==== Fundraising ====
Campaign finance reports as of October 14, 2026
Candidate	Raised	Spent	Cash on hand
Hillary Scholten (D)	$3,034,438	$1,852,380	$1,531,771
Terri DeBoer (R)	$865,481	$795,200	$70,280
Source: Federal Election Commission

==== Results ====
2026 Michigan's 3rd congressional district election results
Party	Candidate	Votes	%	±%
Democratic	Hillary Scholten (incumbent)	211,664	57.17	+3.47
Republican	Terri DeBoer	153,247	41.39	−2.41
Independent	Joe Jock	5,344	1.44	+1.44
Total votes		369,388	100.0	
Democratic hold				

== District 4 ==
2026 Michigan's 4th congressional district election

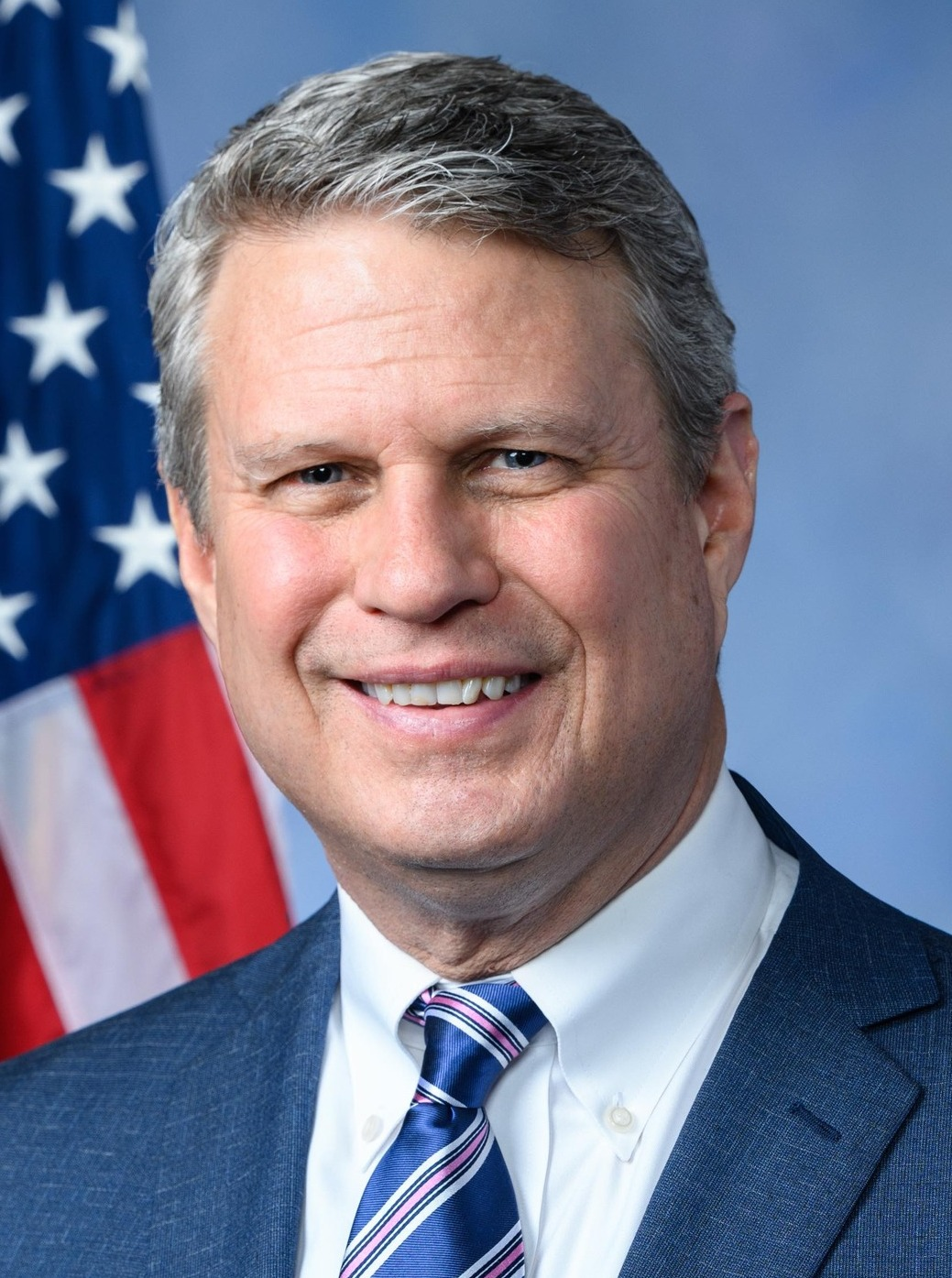
Nominee	Sean McCann	Bill Huizenga
Party	Democratic	Republican
Popular vote	184,338	177,785
Percentage	50.1%	48.3%
- County results McCann: 50–60% 60–70% Huizenga: 50–60%
U.S. representative before election
Bill Huizenga
Republican
Elected U.S. representative
Sean McCann
Democratic

The 4th district is based in southwestern Michigan, and includes the cities of Kalamazoo and Holland. The incumbent, Republican Bill Huizenga, was re-elected with 55.1% of the vote in 2024.

=== Republican primary ===
==== Nominee ====
- Bill Huizenga, incumbent U.S. representative (2011–present)

==== Eliminated in primary ====
- Phil Tanis, former mayor of Holland

==== Endorsements ====
Bill Huizenga

Executive branch officials

- Donald Trump, 45th and 47th president of the United States (2017–2021, 2025–present)

Organizations

- AIPAC
- Detroit Regional Chamber PAC

Newspapers

- The Detroit News (Republican primary only)

==== Fundraising ====
Campaign finance reports as of July 15, 2026
Candidate	Raised	Spent	Cash on hand
Bill Huizenga (R)	$4,093,991	$1,934,284	$2,268,746
Source: Federal Election Commission

==== Results ====
Republican primary results
Party	Candidate	Votes	%
Republican	Bill Huizenga (incumbent)	71,455	85.13
Republican	Phil Tanis	12,481	14.87
Total votes		83,936	100.0

=== Democratic primary ===
==== Nominee ====
- Sean McCann, state senator from the 19th district (2019–present)

==== Eliminated in primary ====
- Diop Harris, former legislative correspondent for U.S. Senator Sherrod Brown

==== Withdrawn ====
- Jessica Swartz, attorney and nominee for this district in 2024 (ran for state house)

==== Endorsements ====
Diop Harris

Organizations

- CAIR Action
- Michigan Democratic Party Progressive Caucus
- Track AIPAC
Sean McCann

Statewide officials

- Jocelyn Benson, secretary of state of Michigan (2019–present)
- Gretchen Whitmer, governor of Michigan (2019–present)

U.S. senators

- Elissa Slotkin, Michigan (2025–present)

U.S. representatives

- Jason Crow, CO-06 (2019–present)
- Suzan DelBene, WA-01 (2012–present)
- Mark Schauer, former MI-07 (2009–2011)
- Hillary Scholten, MI-03 (2023–present)
- Greg Stanton, AZ-04 (2019–present)

State legislators

- Winnie Brinks, Senate majority leader (2023–present) from SD-29 (2019–present)
- Matt Longjohn, HD-40 (2025–present)

Labor unions

- American Federation of State, County and Municipal Employees
- International Brotherhood of Teamsters Local 406
- Michigan AFL-CIO
- Michigan Education Association
- Michigan United Association
- SMART transportation division
- United Auto Workers Region 1D

Organizations

- DCCC Red to Blue
- Human Rights Campaign
- Reproductive Freedom for All

Newspapers

- The Detroit News (Democratic primary only)

==== Fundraising ====
Italics indicate a withdrawn candidate.

Campaign finance reports as of July 15, 2026
Candidate	Raised	Spent	Cash on hand
Diop Harris (D)	$142,305 (Note: $1,000 of this total has been self-funded by Harris)	$129,475	$7,296
Sean McCann (D)	$2,620,010	$933,771	$1,686,239
Jessica Swartz (D)	$341,607	$357,791	$99,343
Source: Federal Election Commission

==== Results ====
Results by county McCann: 50–60%; 60–70%; 70–78%; Harris: 50–60%

Democratic primary
Party	Candidate	Votes	%
Democratic	Sean McCann	65,587	65.67
Democratic	Diop Harris	34,283	34.33
Total votes		99,870	100.0

=== General election ===
==== Predictions ====
Source	Ranking	As of
Decision Desk HQ	Tossup	October 30, 2026
The Cook Political Report	Tossup	October 9, 2026
Inside Elections	Tossup	October 29, 2026
Sabato's Crystal Ball	Lean D (flip)	November 2, 2026
The Economist	Lean R	May 22, 2026
Silver Bulletin	Tossup	August 15, 2026

==== Post-primary endorsements ====
Bill Huizenga (R)

Organizations

- MAGA Inc.

Newspapers

- The Detroit News
Sean McCann (D)

U.S. senators

- Gordon J. Humphrey, former New Hampshire (1979–1990) (Independent; elected as a Republican)

U.S. representatives

- Steve Bartlett, former TX-03 (1983–1991) (Republican)
- Jim Greenwood, former PA-08 (1993–2005) (Republican)
- Jamie Raskin, MD-08 (2017–present)
- Claudine Schneider, former RI-02 (1981–1991) (Republican)
- Chris Shays, former CT-04 (1987–2009) (Republican)
- Peter Plympton Smith, former VT-AL (1989–1991) (Republican)

Labor unions

- Amalgamated Transit Union
- American Federation of Government Employees
- Communication Workers of America
- International Association of Fire Fighters
- LiUNA Local 55
- Michigan Building Trades
- National Education Association
- United Association
- United Food and Commercial Workers Local 951

Organizations

- House Majority PAC
- League of Conservation Voters
- Sierra Club

==== Fundraising ====
Campaign finance reports as of October 14, 2026
Candidate	Raised	Spent	Cash on hand
Bill Huizenga (R)	$5,562,774	$5,277,593	$394,221
Sean McCann (D)	$4,699,153	$3,664,710	$1,034,442
Source: Federal Election Commission

==== Polling ====
Poll source	Date(s) administered	Sample size	Margin of error	Bill Huizenga (R)	Sean McCann (D)	Other	Undecided
RedBox Research (D) (Note: Sponsored by A Fight Worth Having, a progressive Super PAC)	October 20–23, 2026	787 (LV)	± 6.6%	47%	44%	5% (Note: Barnett (G) 2%, Someone else 2%, Prefer not to answer 1%)	4%
GBAO (D) (Note: Poll sponsored by McCann's campaign)	September 13–16, 2026	500 (LV)	± 4.4%	46%	47%	–	7%
GBAO (D)	May 28 – June 1, 2026	500 (LV)	± 4.4%	45%	48%	–	7%
Ragnar Research Partners (R) (Note: Poll commissioned by Conservatives For America, an organization linked to the Republican Study Committee)	March 12–14, 2026	400 (LV)	± 5.0%	48%	42%	–	10%
Public Policy Polling (D)	November 20–21, 2025	559 (RV)	± 4.1%	44%	42%	–	15%

Hypothetical polling

Generic Republican vs. generic Democrat

Poll source	Date(s) administered	Sample size	Margin of error	Generic Republican	Generic Democrat	Undecided
Ragnar Research Partners (R)	March 12–14, 2026	400 (LV)	± 5.0%	43%	42%	15%

==== Results ====
2026 Michigan's 4th congressional district election results
Party	Candidate	Votes	%	±%
Democratic	Sean McCann	184,338	50.12	+6.72
Republican	Bill Huizenga (incumbent)	177,785	48.34	−6.59
Green	Shafina Che Barnett	5,655	1.54	+1.54
Total votes		367,778	100.0	
Democratic gain from Republican				

== District 5 ==
2026 Michigan's 5th congressional district election
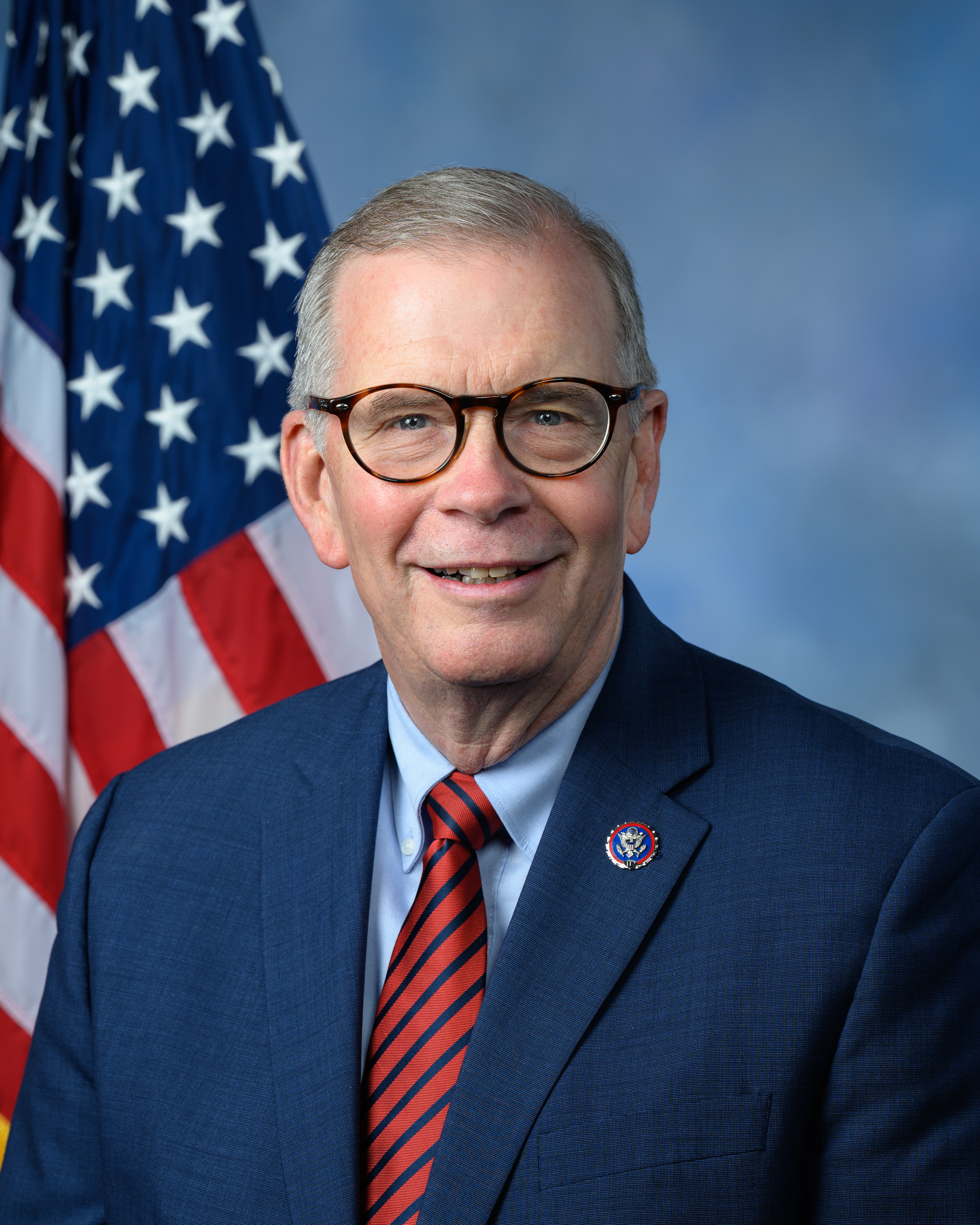

Nominee	Tim Walberg	Christian Vukasovich
Party	Republican	Democratic
Popular vote	199,538	130,126
Percentage	59.12%	38.56%
- County results Walberg: 50–60% 60–70% 70–80%
U.S. representative before election
Tim Walberg
Republican
Elected U.S. representative
Tim Walberg
Republican

The 5th district is located in southern Michigan and covers the state's entire border with both Indiana and Ohio. The incumbent is Republican Tim Walberg, who was re-elected with 65.7% of the vote in 2024.

=== Republican primary ===
==== Nominee ====
- Tim Walberg, incumbent U.S. representative (2007–2009, 2011–present)

==== Endorsements ====
Tim Walberg

Executive branch officials

- Donald Trump, 45th and 47th president of the United States (2017–2021, 2025–present)

Organizations

- AIPAC
- Detroit Regional Chamber PAC

==== Fundraising ====
Campaign finance reports as of July 15, 2026
Candidate	Raised	Spent	Cash on hand
Tim Walberg (R)	$1,742,398	$1,658,017	$993,833
Source: Federal Election Commission

==== Results ====
Republican primary results
Party	Candidate	Votes	%
Republican	Tim Walberg (incumbent)	77,105	100.0
Total votes		77,105	100.0

=== Democratic primary ===
==== Nominee ====
- Christian Vukasovich, college professor

==== Withdrawn ====
- Jacob Vravis, support specialist

==== Fundraising ====
Campaign finance reports as of June 30, 2026
Candidate	Raised	Spent	Cash on hand
Christian Vukasovich (D)	$55,756	$42,466	$13,290
Source: Federal Election Commission

==== Results ====
Democratic primary results
Party	Candidate	Votes	%
Democratic	Christian Vukasovich	64,425	100.0
Total votes		64,425	100.0

=== Green convention ===
==== Nominee ====
- James Bronke, retired engineer and nominee for this district in 2024

=== General election ===
==== Predictions ====
Source	Ranking	As of
Decision Desk HQ	Safe R	July 14, 2026
The Cook Political Report	Solid R	May 13, 2026
Inside Elections	Solid R	May 21, 2026
Sabato's Crystal Ball	Safe R	May 26, 2026
The Economist	Safe R	May 22, 2026

==== Post-primary endorsements ====
Tim Walberg (R)

Newspapers

- The Detroit News
Christian Vukasovich (D)

Labor unions

- American Federation of Government Employees
- Michigan Education Association
- National Education Association

==== Fundraising ====
Campaign finance reports as of October 14, 2026
Candidate	Raised	Spent	Cash on hand
Tim Walberg (R)	$2,220,378	$1,949,864	$1,179,966
Christian Vukasovich (D)	$151,703	$112,187	$39,516
Ronald A. Muszynski (L)	$1,130	$578	$572
Source: Federal Election Commission

==== Results ====
2026 Michigan's 5th congressional district election results
Party	Candidate	Votes	%	±%
Republican	Tim Walberg (incumbent)	199,538	59.12	−6.57
Democratic	Christian Vukasovich	130,126	38.55	+5.75
Libertarian	Ronald Muszynski	3,464	1.03	+1.03
U.S. Taxpayers	Sharon Reiner	3,126	0.93	+0.93
Green	Jim Bronke	1,232	0.37	−1.14
Total votes		337,486	100.0	
Republican hold				

== District 6 ==
2026 Michigan's 6th congressional district election
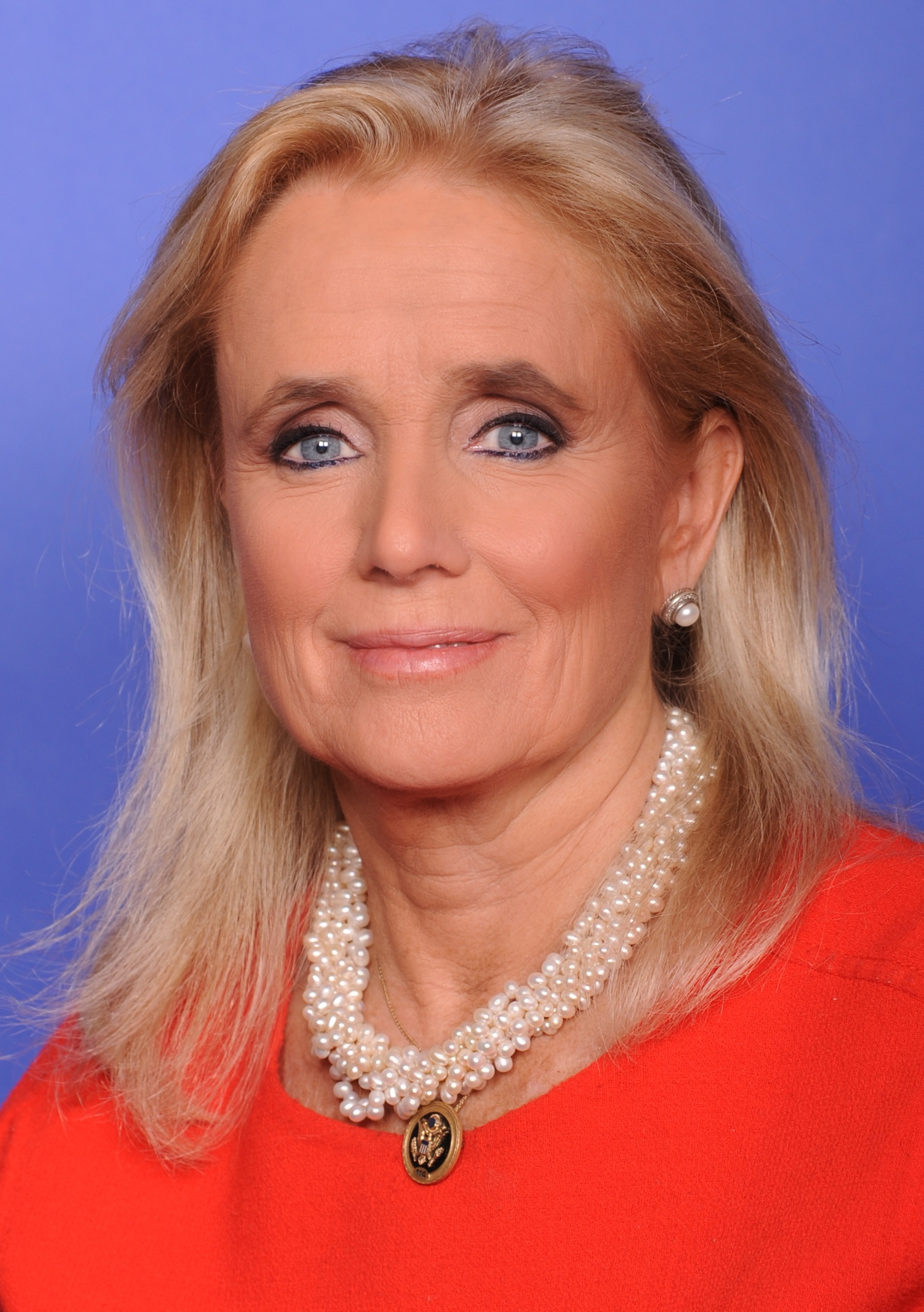

Nominee	Debbie Dingell	Heather Smiley
Party	Democratic	Republican
Popular vote	274,871	123,438
Percentage	67.46%	30.30%
- County results Dingell: 50–60% 60–70% 70–80%
U.S. representative before election
Debbie Dingell
Democratic
Elected U.S. representative
Debbie Dingell
Democratic

The 6th district is centered around Ann Arbor and Washtenaw County, also including parts of western and southern Wayne County. The incumbent is Democrat Debbie Dingell, who was re-elected with 62% of the vote in 2024.

=== Democratic primary ===
==== Nominee ====
- Debbie Dingell, incumbent U.S. representative (2015–present)

==== Endorsements ====
Debbie Dingell

Labor unions

- Michigan AFL-CIO
- Michigan Education Association
- National Nurses United

Organizations

- Detroit Regional Chamber PAC
- Emgage Action
- Giffords
- J Street
- Joint Action Committee for Political Affairs
- League of Conservation Voters Action Fund
- Planned Parenthood Action Fund
- Progressive Democrats of America
- Sierra Club

==== Fundraising ====
Campaign finance reports as of July 15, 2026
Candidate	Raised	Spent	Cash on hand
Debbie Dingell (D)	$1,193,711	$1,122,149	$414,934
Source: Federal Election Commission

==== Results ====
Democratic primary results
Party	Candidate	Votes	%
Democratic	Debbie Dingell (incumbent)	150,919	100.0
Total votes		150,919	100.0

=== Republican primary ===
==== Nominee ====
- Heather Smiley, office analyst and nominee for this district in 2024

==== Endorsements ====
Heather Smiley

Organizations

- Log Cabin Republicans

==== Results ====
Republican primary results
Party	Candidate	Votes	%
Republican	Heather Smiley	47,757	100.0
Total votes		47,757	100.0

=== Green convention ===
==== Nominee ====
- Clyde Shabazz, nominee for the 14th district in 2020 and this district in 2024

=== General election ===
==== Predictions ====
Source	Ranking	As of
Decision Desk HQ	Safe D	July 14, 2026
The Cook Political Report	Solid D	May 13, 2026
Inside Elections	Solid D	May 21, 2026
Sabato's Crystal Ball	Safe D	May 26, 2026
The Economist	Safe D	May 22, 2026

==== Post-primary endorsements ====
Debbie Dingell (D)

Labor unions

- American Federation of Government Employees
- National Education Association

Organizations

- National Women's Political Caucus

Newspapers

- Detroit Free Press
- The Detroit News

==== Fundraising ====
Campaign finance reports as of October 14, 2026
Candidate	Raised	Spent	Cash on hand
Debbie Dingell (D)	$1,525,722	$1,413,283	$455,811
Source: Federal Election Commission

==== Results ====
2026 Michigan's 6th congressional district election results
Party	Candidate	Votes	%	±%
Democratic	Debbie Dingell (incumbent)	274,871	67.46	+5.46
Republican	Heather Smiley	123,438	30.30	−4.70
Working Class	Linda Rayburn	3,021	0.74	+0.74
Libertarian	Timothy Teagan	2,840	0.70	−0.50
Green	Clyde Shabazz	2,197	0.54	−1.26
U.S. Taxpayers	Mike Mickevicius	1,074	0.26	+0.26
Write-in		11	0.00	±0.00
Total votes		407,452	100.0	
Democratic hold				

== District 7 ==
2026 Michigan's 7th congressional district election
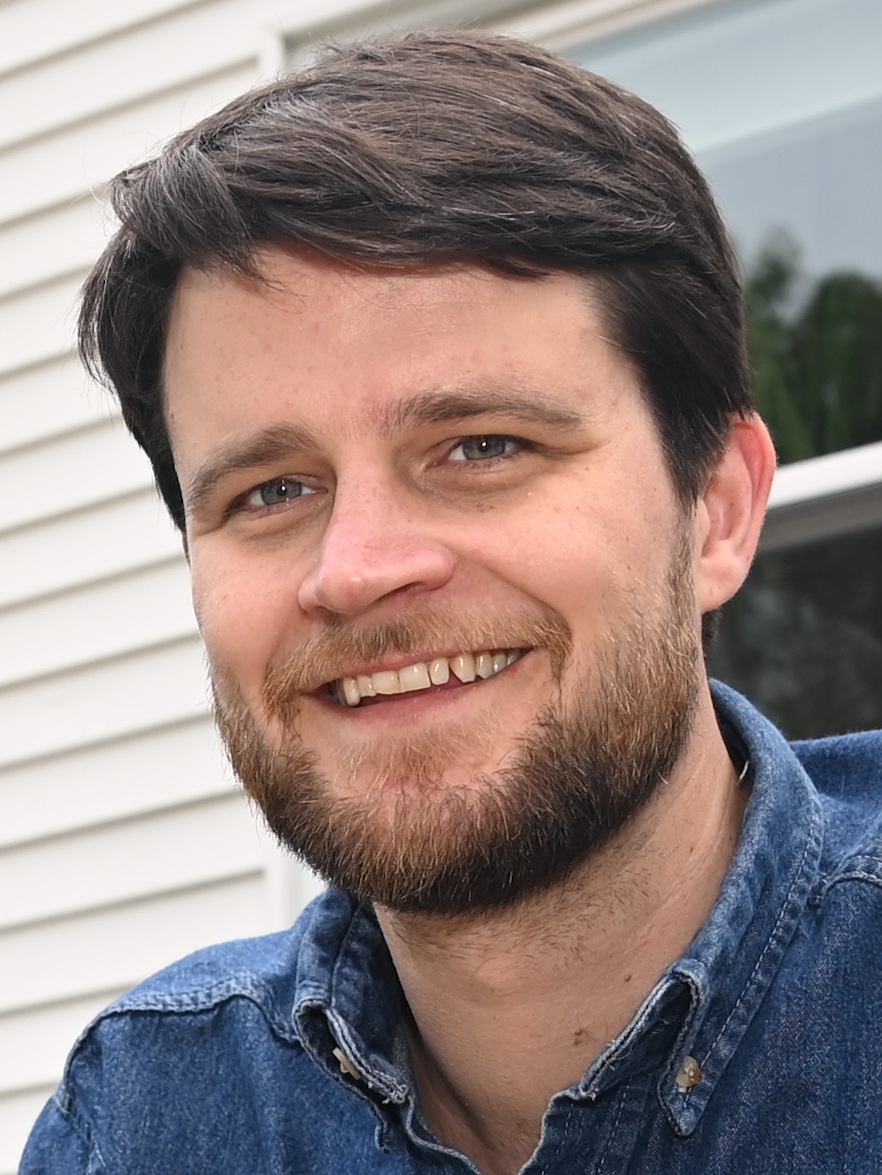

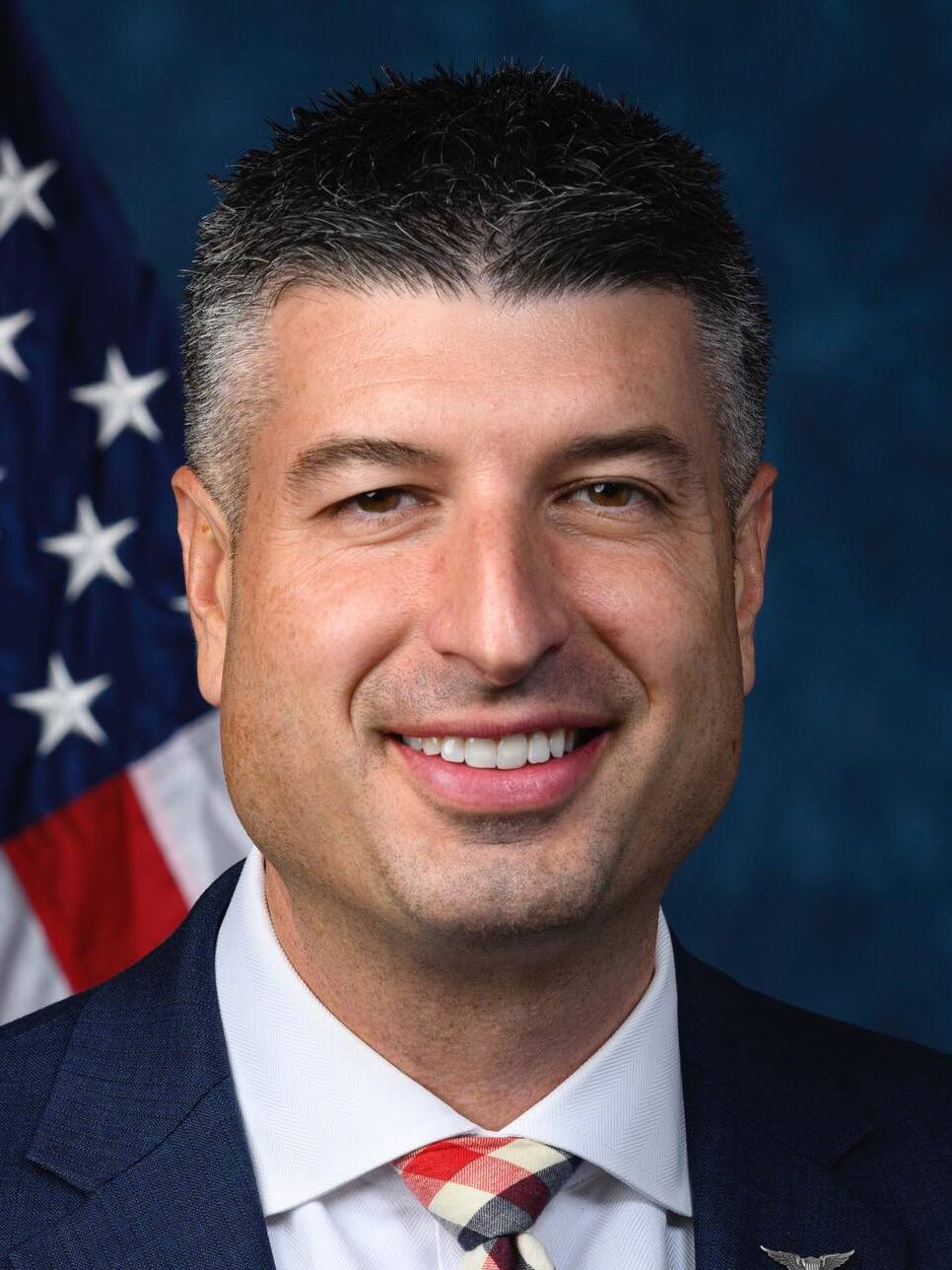
Nominee	William Lawrence	Tom Barrett
Party	Democratic	Republican
Popular vote	202,800	189,500
Percentage	51.05%	47.70%
- County results Lawrence: 50–60% 60–70% Barrett: 50–60% 60–70% 70–80%
U.S. representative before election
Tom Barrett
Republican
Elected U.S. representative
William Lawrence
Democratic

The 7th district is based around the Lansing–East Lansing metropolitan area, but also includes Livingston County and a small part of Oakland County. The incumbent is Republican Tom Barrett, who flipped the district and was elected with 50.3% of the vote in 2024.

The election was one of the most expensive congressional races in the 2026 elections, with over $51.5 million in spending.

=== Republican primary ===
==== Nominee ====
- Tom Barrett, incumbent U.S. representative (2025–present)

==== Endorsements ====
Tom Barrett

Executive branch officials

- Donald Trump, 45th and 47th president of the United States (2017–2021, 2025–present)

U.S. representatives

- Mike Johnson, speaker of the House (2023–present) from LA-04 (2017–present)

Organizations

- AIPAC
- Americans for Prosperity
- Detroit Regional Chamber PAC
- Republican Jewish Coalition

==== Fundraising ====
Campaign finance reports as of July 15, 2026
Candidate	Raised	Spent	Cash on hand
Tom Barrett (R)	$6,306,827	$3,457,355	$2,871,871
Source: Federal Election Commission

==== Results ====
Republican primary results
Party	Candidate	Votes	%
Republican	Tom Barrett (incumbent)	72,468	100.0
Total votes		72,468	100.0

=== Democratic primary ===
==== Nominee ====
- William Lawrence, co-founder of Sunrise Movement

==== Eliminated in primary ====
- Bridget Brink, former U.S. ambassador to Ukraine (2022–2025) and Slovakia (2019–2022)
- Matt Maasdam, former representative for the U.S. Special Operations Command at the National Counterterrorism Center

==== Withdrawn ====
- Josh Cowen, professor at Michigan State University (endorsed Brink)
- Muhammad Salman Rais, physician

==== Endorsements ====
Bridget Brink

Executive branch officials

- Jennifer Granholm, former United States secretary of energy (2021–2025) and former governor of Michigan (2003–2011)

Statewide officials

- Jim Blanchard, former governor of Michigan (1983-1991)

U.S. representatives

- David Bonior, former House whip (Note: Bonior was the majority whip from 1991 to 1995 and minority whip from 1995 to 2002) (1991–2002) from MI-10 (1977–2003)
- Jasmine Crockett, TX-30 (2023–present)
- Lois Frankel, FL-22 (2013–present)
- Adam Smith, WA-9 (1997–present)

State legislators

- Joey Andrews, HD-38 (2023–present)
- Noah Arbit, HD-20 (2023–present)
- Joan Bauer, former HD-68 (2007–2012)
- Jennifer Conlin, HD-48 (2023–present)
- Mark Meadows, former HD-69 (2006–2012) and former mayor of East Lansing (1997–2005, 2015–2019)
- Sam Singh, SD-28 (2023–present)
- Francis "Bus" Spaniola, former HD-87 (1975–1990)
- Joe Tate, former speaker of the Michigan House of Representatives (2023–2025) from HD-09 (2019–present)

Local officials

- Andy Schor, mayor of Lansing (2018–present) and former state representative from the 68th district (2013–2018)
- Todd Tennis, Ingham County commissioner from the 4th district (2007–present)

Labor unions

- International Association of Bridge, Structural, Ornamental and Reinforcing Iron Workers Local 25
- LiUNA District Council
- Michigan Education Association
- Michigan Machinists Council
- UNITE HERE Local 24

Organizations

- Elect Democratic Women
- EMILYs List
- Michigan Democratic Party Veterans Caucus
- Vote Mama

Newspapers

- Detroit Free Press
William Lawrence

U.S. senators

- Bernie Sanders, Vermont (2007–present) (Independent)

U.S. representatives

- Greg Casar, TX-35 (2023–present)
- Maxwell Frost, FL-10 (2023–present)
- Pramila Jayapal, WA-7 (2017–present)
- Ro Khanna, CA-17 (2017–present)
- Andy Levin, former MI-9 (2019–2023)
- Delia Ramirez, IL-3 (2023–present)
- Jamie Raskin, MD-8 (2017–present)
- Rashida Tlaib, MI-12 (2019–present)

State legislators

- Emily Dievendorf, HD-77 (2023–present)
- Kara Hope, HD-74 (2019–present)
- Lynn Jondahl, former HD-70 (1973–1994)
- Chris Rabb, Pennsylvania's HD-200 (2017–present) and 2026 Democratic nominee for PA-3
- Claire Valdez, New York's AD-37 (2025–present) and 2026 Democratic nominee for NY-7

Local officials

- Abdul El-Sayed, former Wayne County health director (2023–2025)

Individuals

- Ms. Rachel, YouTuber and children's educator

Labor unions

- Communications Workers of America District 4
- National Nurses United

Organizations

- CAIR Action
- Center for Biological Diversity Action Fund
- Climate Hawks Vote
- Congressional Progressive Caucus
- Food & Water Action
- Friends of the Earth Action
- Gen-Z for Change
- Indivisible and local Michigan 7th
- Michigan Democratic Party Progressive Caucus
- MoveOn
- A New Policy PAC
- Our Revolution
- Peace Action
- Progressive Change Campaign Committee
- Progressive Democrats of America
- Progressive Victory
- Showing Up for Racial Justice
- Sierra Club
- Sunrise Movement (co-founded by candidate)
- Track AIPAC
- Track Oil PACs

Political parties

- Working Families Party
Matt Maasdam

U.S. senators

- Elissa Slotkin, Michigan (2025–present)

U.S. representatives

- Max Rose, former NY-11 (2019–2021)
- Pat Ryan, NY-18 (2022–present)
- Mark Schauer, former MI-07 (2009–2011)

State legislators

- Dianne Byrum, former minority leader of the Michigan House of Representatives from HD-67 (2003–2006)

Labor unions

- Bricklayers and Allied Craftworkers Local 2
- International Association of Sheet Metal, Air, Rail and Transportation Workers
- International Brotherhood of Electrical Workers Michigan State Conference and Local 665
- International Brotherhood of Teamsters Local 243
- International Union of Painters and Allied Trades Council 1M
- Michigan Professional Fire Fighters Union
- Michigan United Association

Organizations

- End Citizens United
- VoteVets

Newspapers

- The Detroit News (Democratic primary only)
Josh Cowen (withdrawn)

Statewide officials

- Jill Underly, Wisconsin superintendent of public instruction (2021–present)

Labor unions

- UNITE HERE Local 24

==== Fundraising ====
Italics indicate a withdrawn candidate.

Campaign finance reports as of July 15, 2026
Candidate	Raised	Spent	Cash on hand
Bridget Brink (D)	$2,977,601 (Note: $20,000 of this total has been self-funded by Brink)	$2,136,142	$841,459
Josh Cowen (D)	$209,460	$209,460	$0
William Lawrence (D)	$1,119,197 (Note: $10,000 of this total has been self-funded by Lawrence)	$736,082	$383,115
Matt Maasdam (D)	$2,126,381	$1,662,352	$464,028
Source: Federal Election Commission

==== Polling ====
Poll source	Date(s) administered	Sample size	Margin of error	Bridget Brink	William Lawrence	Matt Maasdam	Undecided
Global Strategy Group (D) (Note: Poll sponsored by Maasdam's campaign)	July 23–26, 2026	500 (LV)	± 4.4%	19%	38%	27%	16%
GQR (D) (Note: Poll sponsored by Brink's campaign)	June 22–27, 2026	400 (LV)	± 4.9%	30%	23%	17%	30%
GQR (D)	June 22–27, 2026	400 (LV)	± 4.9%	39%	—	22%	39%
Data for Progress (D) (Note: Poll sponsored by Lawrence's campaign)	April 23–28, 2026	533 (LV)	± 4.0%	14%	20%	10%	56%
GQR (D)	March 22–27, 2026	500 (LV)	± 4.4%	31%	14%	7%	46%
Strategic National	March 17–18, 2026	300 (LV)	± 5.7%	5%	6%	4%	85%
Impact Research (D)	March 4–9, 2026	500 (LV)	± 4.4%	15%	17%	8%	60%

==== Results ====
Results by county Lawrence: 30–40%; 40–50%; 50–60%; Brink: 30–40%; Maasdam: 50–60%

Results by precinct Lawrence: 30–40%; 40–50%; 50–60%; 60–70%; 70–80%; 80–90%; 90–100%; Brink: 30–40%; 40–50%; 50–60%; Maasdam: 30–40%; 40–50%; 50–60%

Democratic primary
Party	Candidate	Votes	%
Democratic	William Lawrence	55,933	43.65
Democratic	Bridget Brink	36,885	28.79
Democratic	Matt Maasdam	35,315	27.56
Total votes		128,133	100.0

=== General election ===
==== Predictions ====
Source	Ranking	As of
Decision Desk HQ	Likely D (flip)	October 20, 2026
The Cook Political Report	Tossup	May 13, 2026
Inside Elections	Tossup	May 21, 2026
Sabato's Crystal Ball	Lean D (flip)	November 2, 2026
The Economist	Lean D (flip)	May 22, 2026

==== Post-primary endorsements ====
Tom Barrett (R)

U.S. representatives

- David McIntosh, former IN-02 (1995–2001)

Organizations

- America PAC
- Americans for Prosperity
- Club for Growth
- Congressional Leadership Fund
- MAGA Inc.
- MAHA Action
- MAHA PAC
- National Republican Congressional Committee
- U.S. Chamber of Commerce

Newspapers

- The Detroit News
William Lawrence (D)

U.S. representatives

- Suzan DelBene, WA-01 (2012–present)

Individuals

- Randi Weingarten, president of the American Federation of Teachers (2008–present)

Labor unions

- American Association of University Professors
- American Federation of Government Employees
- International Alliance of Theatrical Stage Employees Local 274
- Michigan AFL-CIO
- Michigan Education Association
- Michigan Professional Fire Fighters Union
- National Education Association
- United Auto Workers
- United Farm Workers
- United Food and Commercial Workers Local 876

Organizations

- Black Economic Alliance
- Christopher Street Project
- DCCC Red to Blue
- House Majority PAC
- Human Rights Campaign
- Jane Fonda Climate PAC
- League of Conservation Voters
- National Association of Social Workers PAC
- National Committee to Preserve Social Security and Medicare
- Reproductive Freedom for All

Newspapers

- Detroit Free Press

==== Debate ====
2026 Michigan's 7th congressional district general election debate
No.	Date	Host	Moderator	Link	Republican	Democratic
Key: P Participant A Absent N Not invited I Invited W Withdrawn						
Key: P Participant A Absent N Not invited I Invited W Withdrawn					Barrett	Lawrence
1	October 6, 2026	WILX-TV; WKAR-TV; Fox 47	Sheri Jones; David Andrews	YouTube	P	P

==== Fundraising ====
Campaign finance reports as of October 14, 2026
Candidate	Raised	Spent	Cash on hand
Tom Barrett (R)	$8,238,468	$7,221,105	$1,039,762
William Lawrence (D)	$4,160,041	$3,531,075	$628,965
Source: Federal Election Commission

==== Polling ====
Poll source	Date(s) administered	Sample size	Margin of error	Tom Barrett (R)	William Lawrence (D)	Undecided
Emerson College (Note: Poll sponsored by Poll Vault)	October 12–14, 2026	314 (LV)	–	45%	53%	2%
Global Strategy Group (D) (Note: Poll sponsored by House Majority PAC, which is focused on electing Democrats to the U.S. House of Representatives)	August 11–13, 2026	500 (LV)	—	47%	49%	4%
Data for Progress (D)	June 24–30, 2026	772 (LV)	± 4.0%	46%	48%	6%

Hypothetical polling

Tom Barrett vs. Bridget Brink

Poll source	Date(s) administered	Sample size	Margin of error	Tom Barrett (R)	Bridget Brink (D)	Undecided
Data for Progress (D)	June 24–30, 2026	772 (LV)	± 4%	46%	45%	9%
Public Policy Polling (D)	April 24–26, 2026	519 (RV)	± 4.3%	45%	46%	9%
Public Policy Polling (D)	October 27–28, 2025	557 (RV)	± 4.2%	41%	45%	14%

Tom Barrett vs. Matt Maasdam

Poll source	Date(s) administered	Sample size	Margin of error	Tom Barrett (R)	Matt Maasdam (D)	Undecided
Data for Progress (D)	June 24–30, 2026	772 (LV)	± 4%	47%	46%	7%
Public Policy Polling (D)	April 24–26, 2026	519 (RV)	± 4.3%	44%	45%	11%
Public Policy Polling (D)	October 27–28, 2025	557 (RV)	± 4.2%	39%	43%	18%

==== Results ====
2026 Michigan's 7th congressional district election results
Party	Candidate	Votes	%	±%
Democratic	William Lawrence	202,800	51.05	+4.45
Republican	Tom Barrett (incumbent)	189,500	47.70	−2.60
Green	Shane Dedrick	4,973	1.25	+1.25
Total votes		397,273	100.0	
Democratic gain from Republican				

== District 8 ==
2026 Michigan's 8th congressional district election

Nominee	Kristen McDonald Rivet	Thomas Smith
Party	Democratic	Republican
Popular vote	195,946	147,908
Percentage	55.52%	41.91%
- County results McDonald Rivet: 40–50% 50–60% Smith: 50–60%
U.S. representative before election
Kristen McDonald Rivet
Democratic
Elected U.S. representative
Kristen McDonald Rivet
Democratic

The 8th district centers around the Saginaw Bay and includes the cities of Flint, Saginaw, Bay City, and Midland. The incumbent is Democrat Kristen McDonald Rivet, who was elected with 51.3% of the vote in 2024.

=== Democratic primary ===
==== Nominee ====
- Kristen McDonald Rivet, incumbent U.S. representative (2025–present)

==== Endorsements ====
Kristen McDonald Rivet

Labor unions

- Michigan AFL-CIO
- Michigan Education Association

Organizations

- Black Economic Alliance PAC
- Detroit Regional Chamber PAC
- Elect Democratic Women
- EMILY's List
- Giffords
- J Street
- Jewish Democratic Council of America
- Joint Action Committee for Political Affairs
- League of Conservation Voters Action Fund
- Michigan Farm Bureau AgriPac
- Planned Parenthood Action Fund
- Reproductive Freedom for All
- Vote Mama
- WelcomePAC

==== Fundraising ====
Campaign finance reports as of July 15, 2026
Candidate	Raised	Spent	Cash on hand
Kristen McDonald Rivet (D)	$5,644,876	$1,407,807	$4,254,098
Source: Federal Election Commission

==== Results ====
Democratic primary results
Party	Candidate	Votes	%
Democratic	Kristen McDonald Rivet (incumbent)	104,783	100.0
Total votes		104,783	100.0

=== Republican primary ===
==== Nominee ====
- Tom Smith, retired engineer (suspended campaign during the primary and endorsed Lemmo)

==== Eliminated in primary ====
- Amir Hassan, former Navy officer and federal law enforcement officer
- Alfred Lemmo, mechanical engineer and candidate for the 13th district in 2020

==== Endorsements ====
Amir Hassan

Executive branch officials

- Donald Trump, 45th and 47th president of the United States (2017–2021, 2025–present)

U.S. representatives

- Jack Bergman, MI-01 (2017–present)
- Dave Camp, former MI-04 (1991–2015)
- Bill Huizenga, MI-04 (2011–present)
- John James, MI-10 (2023–present)
- John Moolenaar, MI-02, (2015–present)
- Burgess Owens, UT-04 (2021–present)
- Bill Schuette, former MI-10 (1985–1991) and former Michigan attorney general (2011–2019)
- Tim Walberg, MI-05 (2007–2009, 2011–present)

Newspapers

- The Detroit News (Republican primary only)
Alfred Lemmo

Individuals

- Thomas J. Smith, retired engineer and former primary candidate for this district

==== Fundraising ====
Campaign finance reports as of July 15, 2026
Candidate	Raised	Spent	Cash on hand
Amir Hassan (R)	$727,342 (Note: $25,000 of this total has been self-funded by Hassan)	$622,841	$104,500
Alfred Lemmo (R)	$220,292 (Note: $220,292 of this total has been self-funded by Lemmo)	$229,092	$200
Source: Federal Election Commission

==== Results ====
Smith did not meet the deadline to be removed from the primary ballot. He had until August 24 to decline the nomination in order to be removed from the general election ballot.

Republican primary results
Party	Candidate	Votes	%
Republican	Thomas J. Smith (suspended campaign)	31,283	50.44
Republican	Amir Hassan	20,579	33.18
Republican	Alfred Lemmo	10,159	16.38
Total votes		62,021	100.0

=== General election ===
==== Predictions ====
Source	Ranking	As of
Decision Desk HQ	Safe D	September 25, 2026
The Cook Political Report	Likely D	August 25, 2026
Inside Elections	Solid D	August 6, 2026
Sabato's Crystal Ball	Likely D	May 26, 2026
The Economist	Safe D	May 22, 2026

==== Post-primary endorsements ====
Kristen McDonald Rivet (D)

Labor unions

- American Federation of Government Employees
- National Education Association

Newspapers

- Detroit Free Press
- The Detroit News

==== Fundraising ====
Campaign finance reports as of October 14, 2026
Candidate	Raised	Spent	Cash on hand
Kristen McDonald Rivet (D)	$6,922,878	$4,265,040	$2,674,869
Thomas J. Smith (R)	$561,096	$476,030	$85,065
Source: Federal Election Commission

==== Results ====
2026 Michigan's 8th congressional district election results
Party	Candidate	Votes	%	±%
Democratic	Kristen McDonald Rivet (incumbent)	195,946	55.52	+4.22
Republican	Thomas Smith	147,908	41.91	−2.69
Working Class	Kathy Goodwin	5,172	1.46	−0.54
Libertarian	C. Mia Pettus	2,857	0.81	−0.29
Green	Jim Casha	1,044	0.30	−0.10
Total votes		352,927	100.0	
Democratic hold				

== District 9 ==
2026 Michigan's 9th congressional district election
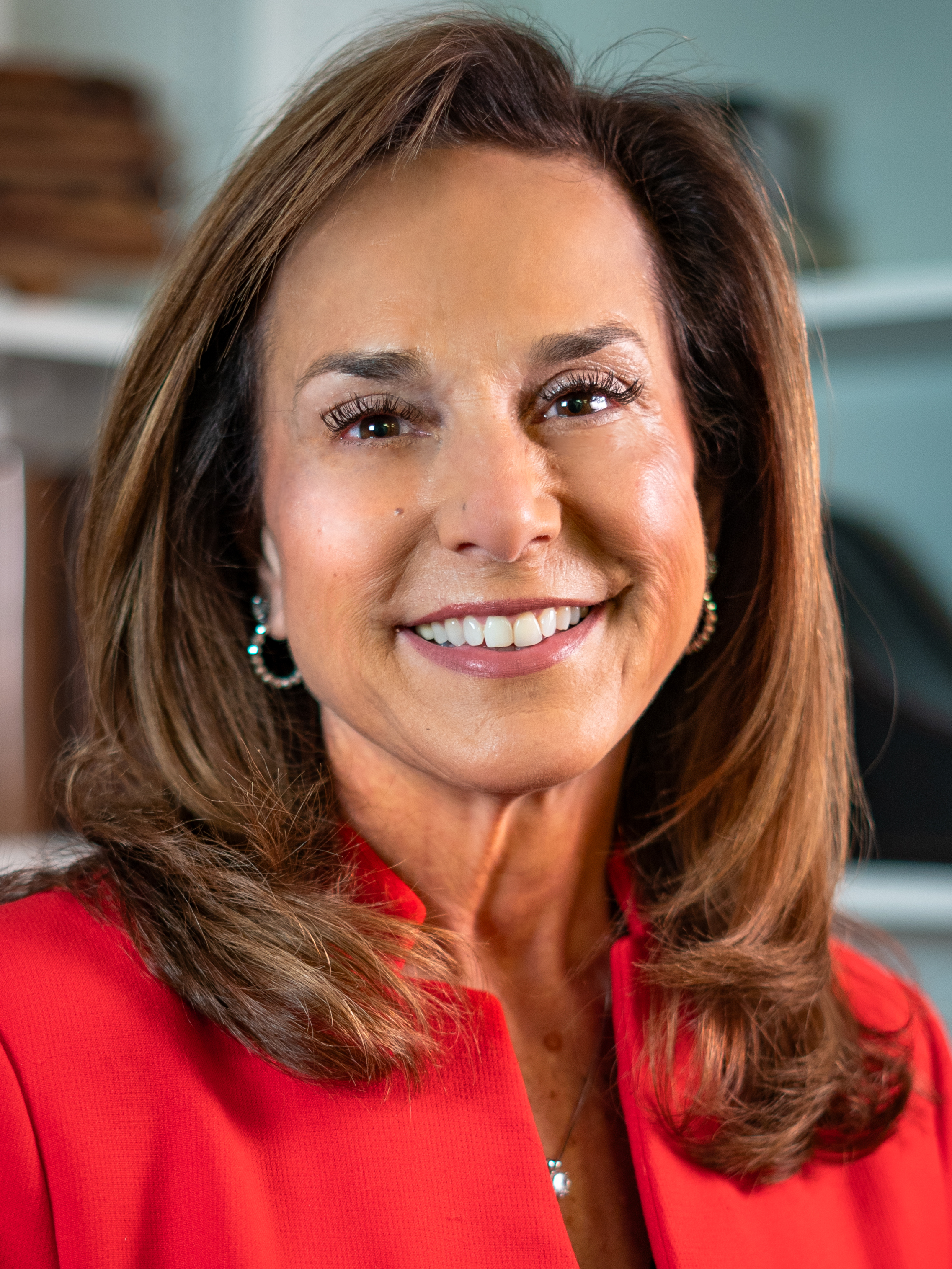

Nominee	Lisa McClain	Ray Pooley
Party	Republican	Democratic
Popular vote	247,845	137,349
Percentage	62.64%	34.71%
- County results McClain: 50–60% 60–70% 70–80%
U.S. representative before election
Lisa McClain
Republican
Elected U.S. representative
Lisa McClain
Republican

The 9th district is based in The Thumb region, including Port Huron as well as the northern Detroit exurbs in Oakland and Macomb counties. The incumbent is Republican Lisa McClain, who was re-elected with 66.8% of the vote in 2024.

=== Republican primary ===
==== Nominee ====
- Lisa McClain, incumbent U.S. representative (2021–present)

==== Withdrawn ====
- Daltson Atwell, landscaping contractor (ran for state senate)

==== Endorsements ====
Lisa McClain

Organizations

- AIPAC
- Detroit Regional Chamber PAC

==== Fundraising ====
Italics indicate a withdrawn candidate.

Campaign finance reports as of July 15, 2026
Candidate	Raised	Spent	Cash on hand
Daltson Atwell (R)	$28,220	$28,203	$16
Lisa McClain (R)	$5,242,308	$4,312,276	$1,536,889
Source: Federal Election Commission

==== Results ====
Republican primary results
Party	Candidate	Votes	%
Republican	Lisa McClain (incumbent)	103,344	100.0
Total votes		103,344	100.0

=== Democratic primary ===
==== Nominee ====
- Ray Pooley, CNC machinist and programmer

==== Fundraising ====
Campaign finance reports as of July 15, 2026
Candidate	Raised	Spent	Cash on hand
Ray Pooley (D)	$8,083	$3,141	$4,941
Source: Federal Election Commission

==== Results ====
Democratic primary results
Party	Candidate	Votes	%
Democratic	Ray Pooley	74,387	100.0
Total votes		74,387	100.0

=== Independents ===
==== Filed paperwork ====
- Jasen Cartwright, IT technician
- Fernando Valdez, retired electronic technician

==== Fundraising ====
Campaign finance reports as of July 15, 2026
Candidate	Raised	Spent	Cash on hand
Fernandeo Valdez (I)	$1,933	$1,933	$0
Source: Federal Election Commission

=== General election ===
==== Predictions ====
Source	Ranking	As of
Decision Desk HQ	Safe R	July 14, 2026
The Cook Political Report	Solid R	May 13, 2026
Inside Elections	Solid R	May 21, 2026
Sabato's Crystal Ball	Safe R	May 26, 2026
The Economist	Safe R	May 22, 2026

==== Post-primary endorsements ====
Lisa McClain (R)

Newspapers

- The Detroit News
Ray Pooley (D)

Labor unions

- American Federation of Government Employees

==== Fundraising ====
Campaign finance reports as of October 14, 2026
Candidate	Raised	Spent	Cash on hand
Lisa McClain (R)	$6,046,475	$4,900,622	$1,752,710
Ray Pooley (D)	$26,386	$12,311	$14,075
Source: Federal Election Commission

==== Results ====
2026 Michigan's 9th congressional district election results
Party	Candidate	Votes	%	±%
Republican	Lisa McClain (incumbent)	247,845	62.64	−4.16
Democratic	Ray Pooley	137,349	34.71	+5.20
Working Class	Jim Walkowicz	4,088	1.03	−1.57
Libertarian	Kevin Vayko	3,458	0.87	−0.23
U.S. Taxpayers	John Vlahos	1,580	0.40	+0.40
Green	Destiny Clayton	1,377	0.35	+0.35
Total votes		395,697	100.0	

== District 10 ==
2026 Michigan's 10th congressional district election

Nominee	Christina Hines	Michael Bouchard Jr.
Party	Democratic	Republican
Popular vote	188,207	162,380
Percentage	52.45%	45.25%
- County results Hines: 50–60%
U.S. representative before election
John James
Republican
Elected U.S. representative
Christina Hines
Democratic

The 10th district is based primarily in southeastern Michigan's Macomb County, taking in Warren and Sterling Heights, as well as a small portion of eastern Oakland County. The incumbent is Republican John James, who was re-elected with 51.1% of the vote in 2024. He is not seeking re-election, instead choosing to run for governor of Michigan.

=== Republican primary ===
==== Nominee ====
- Michael Bouchard Jr., Army National Guard captain and son of Oakland County Sheriff Mike Bouchard

==== Eliminated in primary ====
- Steffan Demetropoulos, project manager
- Justin Kirk, attorney

==== Withdrawn ====
- Robert Lulgjuraj, Macomb County assistant prosecuting attorney (2025–present) (remained on ballot)

==== Declined ====
- Joseph Aragona, state representative from the 60th district (2023–present) (endorsed Lulgjuraj)
- John James, incumbent U.S. representative (2023–present) (ran for governor)
- James Tignanelli, president of the Police Officers Association of Michigan (1993–present)

==== Endorsements ====
Michael Bouchard Jr.

Executive branch officials

- David Fischer, former U.S. ambassador to Morocco (2020–2021)
- Donald Trump, 45th and 47th president of the United States (2017–2021, 2025–present)

Local officials

- Mike Bouchard, Oakland County sheriff (1999–present) (candidate's father)
- Peter Lucido, Macomb County prosecuting attorney (2021–present)
- Larry Rocca, Macomb County treasurer (2017–present)

Party officials

- Bobby Schostak, former chair of the Michigan Republican Party (2011–2015)

Organizations

- Susan B. Anthony Pro-Life America
Robert Lulgjuraj (withdrawn)

State legislators

- Joseph Aragona, HD-60 (2023–present)

Organizations

- Southeast Michigan Chamber of Commerce

==== Fundraising ====
Italics indicate a withdrawn candidate.

Campaign finance reports as of July 15, 2026
Candidate	Raised	Spent	Cash on hand
Casey Armitage (R)	$4,132 (Note: $346 of this total has been self-funded by Armitage)	$4,132	$0
Michael Bouchard Jr. (R)	$1,414,723	$456,493	$958,230
Steffan Demetropoulos (R)	$6,765	$5,371	$4,645
Steven Elliott (R)	$47,759 (Note: $10,200 of this total has been self-funded by Elliott)	$79,284	$462
Justin Kirk (R)	$463,208 (Note: $299,100 of this total has been self-funded by Kirk)	$224,831	$238,376
Robert Lulgjuraj (R)	$1,289,610	$569,221	$720,388
Source: Federal Election Commission

==== Polling ====
Poll source	Date(s) administered	Sample size	Margin of error	Michael Bouchard Jr.	Justin Kirk	Robert Lulgjuraj	Other	Undecided
Harper Polling (R) (Note: Poll sponsored by Patriotic Fund PAC)	May 3–5, 2026	400 (LV)	± 4.9%	39%	3%	8%	1% (Note: Steffan Demetropoulos with 1%)	50%
Strategic National (R)	March 15–16, 2026	300 (LV)	± 5.7%	29%	1%	11%	12% (Note: "Some other candidate" with 12%)	47%
OnMessage (R) (Note: Poll sponsored by Bouchard's campaign)	January 30 – February 1, 2026	400 (RV)	–	37%	3%	8%	–	51%

Hypothetical polling

Poll source	Date(s) administered	Sample size	Margin of error	Mike Bouchard Jr.	John James	Justin Kirk	Robert Lulgjuraj	Other	Undecided
Strategic National (R)	March 15–16, 2026	300 (LV)	± 5.7%	18%	36%	0%	8%	5% (Note: "Some other candidate" with 5%)	33%

==== Results ====
Republican primary results
Party	Candidate	Votes	%
Republican	Michael Bouchard Jr.	45,482	72.21
Republican	Justin Kirk	11,391	18.09
Republican	Robert Lulgjuraj (withdrawn)	3,676	5.84
Republican	Steffan Demetropoulos	2,432	3.86
Total votes		62,981	100.0

=== Democratic primary ===
==== Nominee ====
- Christina Hines, prosecutor and nominee for Macomb County prosecuting attorney in 2024

==== Eliminated in primary ====
- Eric Chung, attorney
- Tim Greimel, former mayor of Pontiac (2022–2026) and candidate for the 11th district in 2018

==== Withdrawn ====
- Tripp Adams, U.S. Army Reserve officer (endorsed Hines)
- Alex Hawkins, bomb disposal officer in the Michigan Army National Guard (running for state house, endorsed Chung)

==== Declined ====
- Kevin Hertel, state senator from the 12th district (2023–present)
- Veronica Klinefelt, state senator from the 11th district (2023–present) (endorsed Hines)
- Carl Marlinga, former Macomb County prosecuting attorney and nominee for this district in 2002, 2022, and 2024 (endorsed Hines)

==== Endorsements ====
Eric Chung

Executive branch officials

- Carol Browner, former administrator of the Environmental Protection Agency (1993–2001)
- Ted Osius, former U.S. ambassador to Vietnam (2014–2017)
- Gina Raimondo, former U.S. secretary of commerce (2021–2025)

U.S. senators

- Chris Coons, Delaware (2010–present)
- Andy Kim, New Jersey (2025–present)

U.S. representatives

- Becca Balint, VT-AL (2023–present)
- Judy Chu, CA-28 (2009–present)
- Pablo Hernández Rivera, PR-AL (2025–present)
- Tim Kennedy, NY-26 (2024–present)
- Grace Meng, NY-06 (2013–present)
- Dave Min, CA-47 (2025–present)
- Mike Quigley, IL-05 (2009–present)
- Mark Schauer, former MI-7 (2009–2011)
- Marilyn Strickland, WA-10 (2021–present)
- Mark Takano, CA-39 (2013–present)
- Jill Tokuda, HI-02 (2023–present)
- Ritchie Torres, NY-15 (2021–present)
- Derek Tran, CA-45 (2025–present)

State legislators

- Joey Andrews, HD-38 (2023–present)
- Laurie Pohutsky, HD-17 (2019–present)
- Jimmie Wilson Jr., HD-32 (2023–present)

Local officials

- Brendan Johnson, Oakland County commissioner from the 4th district (2023–present)

Organizations

- AAAFund
- AAPI Victory Fund
- ASPIRE PAC
- College Democrats of Oakland University
- Equality PAC
- Human Rights Campaign
- LGBTQ Victory Fund
Tim Greimel

Local officials

- Colleen Ochoa, member of the Oakland University Board of Trustees (2022–present) and wife of Gary Peters

Labor unions

- American Federation of State, County and Municipal Employees Michigan 925
- Bricklayers and Allied Craftworkers Local 2
- Communications Workers of America District 4
- International Brotherhood of Electrical Workers Local 58
- International Union of Painters and Allied Trades Council 1M
- Michigan AFL-CIO
- Michigan Education Association
- Michigan Professional Fire Fighters Union
- United Union of Roofers, Waterproofers and Allied Workers Local 149

Organizations

- Joint Action Committee for Political Affairs
Christina Hines

U.S. representatives

- Lois Frankel, FL-22 (2013–present)

State legislators

- Rosemary Bayer, SD-13 (2019–present)
- Veronica Klinefelt, SD-11 (2023–present)
- Denise Mentzer, HD-61 (2023–present)
- Veronica Paiz, HD-10 (2023–present)
- Mai Xiong, HD-13 (2024–present)
- Henry Yanez, Sterling Heights city councilor (2019–present) and former HD-25 (2013–2019)

Local officials

- Carl Marlinga, former Macomb County prosecuting attorney and nominee for this district in 2002, 2022, and 2024
- Mindy Moore, Warren City Council secretary
- Angela Rogensues, Warren City Council president
- Michael Taylor, mayor of Sterling Heights
- Anthony Wickersham, Macomb County sheriff (2011–present)

Party officials

- Mark Brewer, former chair of the Michigan Democratic Party (1995–2013)

Labor unions

- International Association of Bridge, Structural, Ornamental and Reinforcing Iron Workers Local 25
- UNITE HERE Local 24

Organizations

- Elect Democratic Women
- EMILY's List
- End Citizens United
- Giffords
- Michigan Democratic Party Veterans Caucus
- Patriotic Millionaires
- Southeast Michigan Chamber of Commerce
- Vote Mama

Newspapers

- The Detroit News (Democratic primary only)

==== Fundraising ====
Italics indicate a withdrawn candidate.

Campaign finance reports as of July 15, 2026
Candidate	Raised	Spent	Cash on hand
Tripp Adams (D)	$198,121	$25,466	$172,654
Eric Chung (D)	$1,920,485	$1,299,088	$621,397
Tim Greimel (D)	$1,263,598 (Note: $7,000 of this total has been self-funded by Greimel)	$935,593	$328,004
Alex Hawkins (D)	$376,391	$376,391	$0
Christina Hines (D)	$1,211,488	$1,053,292	$158,196
Brian Jaye (D)	$909	$3,751	$136
Source: Federal Election Commission

==== Polling ====
Poll source	Date(s) administered	Sample size	Margin of error	Eric Chung	Tim Greimel	Christina Hines	Undecided
Hart Research (D) (Note: Poll sponsored by EMILY's List, which supports Hines)	July 7–9, 2026	400 (LV)	± 5.2%	19%	16%	42%	23%
Global Strategy Group (D) (Note: Poll sponsored by Hines' campaign)	April 23–26, 2026	400 (LV)	± 4.9%	13%	7%	30%	50%

==== Results ====
Democratic primary
Party	Candidate	Votes	%
Democratic	Christina Hines	47,005	47.01
Democratic	Eric Chung	29,662	29.67
Democratic	Tim Greimel	23,315	23.32
Total votes		99,982	100.0

=== General election ===
==== Predictions ====
Source	Ranking	As of
Decision Desk HQ	Lean D (flip)	October 20, 2026
The Cook Political Report	Tossup	August 25, 2026
Inside Elections	Tilt R	May 21, 2026
Sabato's Crystal Ball	Lean D (flip)	November 2, 2026
The Economist	Likely D (flip)	May 22, 2026
Silver Bulletin	Lean D (flip)	August 15, 2026

==== Post-primary endorsements ====
Michael Bouchard Jr. (R)

Organizations

- Detroit Regional Chamber PAC

Newspapers

- The Detroit News
Christina Hines (D)

U.S. representatives

- Suzan DelBene, WA-01 (2012–present)

Labor unions

- American Federation of Government Employees
- Michigan AFL-CIO
- Michigan Education Association
- National Education Association

Organizations

- DCCC Red to Blue
- Democratic Majority for Israel
- Democrats for Education Reform
- Jane Fonda Climate PAC
- Jewish Democratic Council of America
- League of Conservation Voters
- National Women's Political Caucus
- Reproductive Freedom for All

Newspapers

- Detroit Free Press

==== Fundraising ====
Campaign finance reports as of October 14, 2026
Candidate	Raised	Spent	Cash on hand
Michael Bouchard Jr. (R)	$2,884,259	$1,310,789	$1,573,469
Christina Hines (D)	$4,159,692	$3,152,065	$1,007,627
Source: Federal Election Commission

==== Polling ====
Poll source	Date(s) administered	Sample size	Margin of error	Mike Bouchard Jr. (R)	Christina Hines (D)	Others	Undecided
RedBox Research (D) (Note: Sponsored by A Fight Worth Having, which is a progressive Super PAC)	October 20–23, 2026	889 (LV)	± 4.9%	47%	42%	6% (Note: Saliba (L) 2%, Someone else 2%, Prefer not to answer 2%)	4%
Global Strategy Group (D)	August 10–13, 2026	600 (LV)	± 4.4%	45%	45%	–	10%
Public Policy Polling (D)	January 16–17, 2026	592 (RV)	± 4.0%	42%	44%	–	14%

Hypothetical polling

Michael Bouchard Jr. vs. Eric Chung

Poll source	Date(s) administered	Sample size	Margin of error	Mike Bouchard Jr. (R)	Eric Chung (D)	Undecided
Public Policy Polling (D)	January 16–17, 2026	592 (RV)	± 4.0%	43%	41%	16%

Michael Bouchard Jr. vs. Tim Greimel

Poll source	Date(s) administered	Sample size	Margin of error	Mike Bouchard Jr. (R)	Tim Greimel (D)	Undecided
Public Policy Polling (D)	January 16–17, 2026	592 (RV)	± 4.0%	44%	42%	14%

Generic Republican vs. Generic Democrat

Poll source	Date(s) administered	Sample size	Margin of error	Generic Republican	Generic Democrat	Undecided
Global Strategy Group (D)	August 10–13, 2026	600 (LV)	± 4.4%	42%	46%	12%

==== Results ====
2026 Michigan's 10th congressional district election results
Party	Candidate	Votes	%	±%
Democratic	Christina Hines	188,207	52.45	+7.45
Republican	Michael Bouchard	162,380	45.25	−5.85
Working Class	Andrea Kirby	3,984	1.11	−1.49
Libertarian	Mike Saliba	3,089	0.86	−0.44
Green	Kwabena Nkromo	1,175	0.33	+0.33
Total votes		358,835	100.0	
Democratic gain from Republican				

== District 11 ==
2026 Michigan's 11th congressional district election
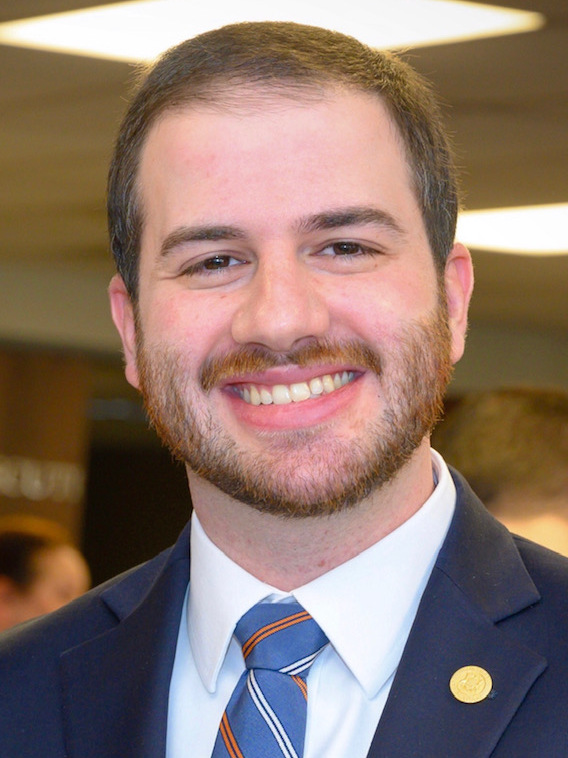

Nominee	Jeremy Moss	Ethan Baker
Party	Democratic	Republican
Popular vote	238,953	144,570
Percentage	60.87%	36.83%
U.S. representative before election
Haley Stevens
Democratic
Elected U.S. representative
Jeremy Moss
Democratic

The 11th district is based solely in Oakland County and includes the cities of Royal Oak and Pontiac. The incumbent is Democrat Haley Stevens, who was re-elected with 58.2% of the vote in 2024. Stevens did not seek re-election, instead choosing to run for U.S. Senate, where she ultimately lost in the primary to Abdul El-Sayed by less than one percentage point.

=== Democratic primary ===
==== Nominee ====
- Jeremy Moss, president pro tempore of the Michigan Senate (2023–present) from the 7th district (2019–present)

==== Eliminated in primary ====
- Aisha Farooqi, attorney and nominee for Michigan's 57th House of Representatives district in 2022 and 2024
- John Torres, Waterford school board trustee and juvenile justice program manager
- Don Ufford, job training professional

==== Disqualified ====
- Stu Baker, writer
- Michelle Murphy, program director

==== Withdrawn ====
- Anil Kumar, member of the Wayne State University Board of Governors and perennial candidate (switched to independent)

==== Declined ====
- Rosemary Bayer, state senator from the 13th district (2023–present) (endorsed Moss)
- Haley Stevens, incumbent U.S. representative (2019–present) (ran for U.S. Senate)

==== Endorsements ====
Aisha Farooqi

U.S. representatives

- Ro Khanna, CA-17 (2017–present)

Organizations

- CAIR Action
- Emgage Action
- Michigan Democratic Party Progressive Caucus
- Track AIPAC
Jeremy Moss

U.S. representatives

- Kristen McDonald Rivet, MI-08 (2025–present)
- Hillary Scholten, MI-03 (2023–present)
- Mark Takano, CA-39 (2013–present)
- Ritchie Torres, NY-15 (2021–present)

Statewide officials

- Jocelyn Benson, secretary of state of Michigan (2019–present)
- James Blanchard, former governor of Michigan (1983–1991)
- Dana Nessel, attorney general of Michigan (2019–present)
- Gretchen Whitmer, governor of Michigan (2019–present)

State legislators

- Rosemary Bayer, SD-13 (2023–present)

Local officials

- David Coulter, Oakland County executive (2019–present)

Labor unions

- LiUNA Local 1076
- Michigan Education Association
- Sheet Metal Workers' Local 80
- United Auto Workers Region 1

Organizations

- Democratic Majority for Israel
- Equality PAC
- Giffords
- Human Rights Campaign PAC
- Jewish Democratic Council of America
- LGBTQ+ Victory Fund
- Michigan Democratic Party Jewish Caucus

Newspapers

- Detroit Free Press
Don Ufford

Organizations

- End Citizens United

Newspapers

- The Detroit News (Democratic primary only)

==== Fundraising ====
Italics indicate a withdrawn candidate.

Campaign finance reports as of July 15, 2026
Candidate	Raised	Spent	Cash on hand
Aisha Farooqi (D)	$421,142	$421,495	$0
Anil Kumar (D)	$124,336	$115,892	$10,104
Jeremy Moss (D)	$1,485,177	$1,132,661	$352,516
John Torres (D)	$147,385 (Note: $55,928 of this total has been self-funded by Torres)	$143,544	$3,841
Don Ufford (D)	$1,018,681	$729,061	$289,619
Source: Federal Election Commission

==== Results ====
Results by Municipality Moss: 30–40%; 40–50%; 50–60%; 60–70%; 70–80%; Farooqi: 40–50%

Democratic primary
Party	Candidate	Votes	%
Democratic	Jeremy Moss	75,449	49.85
Democratic	Aisha Farooqi	47,722	31.54
Democratic	John Torres	15,627	10.33
Democratic	Don Ufford	12,529	8.28
Total votes		151,327	100.0

=== Republican primary ===
==== Nominee ====
- Ethan Baker, mayor of Troy (2019–present)

==== Withdrawn ====
- Mike Steger, political operative (ran for state house)

==== Disqualified ====
- Antonio Prieto, businessman

==== Fundraising ====
Italics indicate a withdrawn candidate.

Campaign finance reports as of July 15, 2026
Candidate	Raised	Spent	Cash on hand
Ethan Baker (R)	$141,876	$21,750	$121,125
Mike Steger (R)	$28,616	$21,248	$7,368
Source: Federal Election Commission

==== Results ====
Republican primary results
Party	Candidate	Votes	%
Republican	Ethan Baker	50,179	100.0
Total votes		50,179	100.0

=== Independents ===
==== Declared ====
- Anil Kumar, member of the Wayne State University Board of Governors and perennial candidate (previously ran as a Democrat)

==== Fundraising ====
Campaign finance reports as of June 30, 2026
Candidate	Raised	Spent	Cash on hand
Anil Kumar (I)	$712,922 (Note: $640,000 of this total has been self-funded by Kumar)	$306,864	$407,719
Source: Federal Election Commission

=== General election ===
==== Predictions ====
Source	Ranking	As of
Decision Desk HQ	Safe D	July 14, 2026
The Cook Political Report	Solid D	May 13, 2026
Inside Elections	Solid D	May 21, 2026
Sabato's Crystal Ball	Safe D	May 26, 2026
The Economist	Safe D	May 22, 2026

==== Post-primary endorsements ====
Jeremy Moss (D)

Labor unions

- American Federation of Government Employees
- Michigan AFL-CIO
- National Education Association
- United Food and Commercial Workers Local 876

Organizations

- Detroit Regional Chamber PAC
Ethan Baker (R)

Newspapers

- The Detroit News

==== Fundraising ====
Italics indicate a withdrawn candidate.

Campaign finance reports as of October 14, 2026
Candidate	Raised	Spent	Cash on hand
Jeremy Moss (D)	$1,874,871	$1,804,872	$69,999
Ethan Baker (R)	$204,668	$149,047	$56,620
Anil Kumar (I)	$724,355	$406,548	$319,467
Source: Federal Election Commission

==== Results ====
2026 Michigan's 11th congressional district election results
Party	Candidate	Votes	%	±%
Democratic	Jeremy Moss	238,953	60.87	+2.67
Republican	Ethan Baker	144,570	36.83	−2.77
Independent	Anil Kumar	3,183	0.81	+0.81
Libertarian	Farid Ishac	2,947	0.75	+0.75
Green	Ryan Teasdale	2,906	0.74	−1.46
Total votes		392,559	100.0	
Democratic hold				

== District 12 ==
2026 Michigan's 12th congressional district election
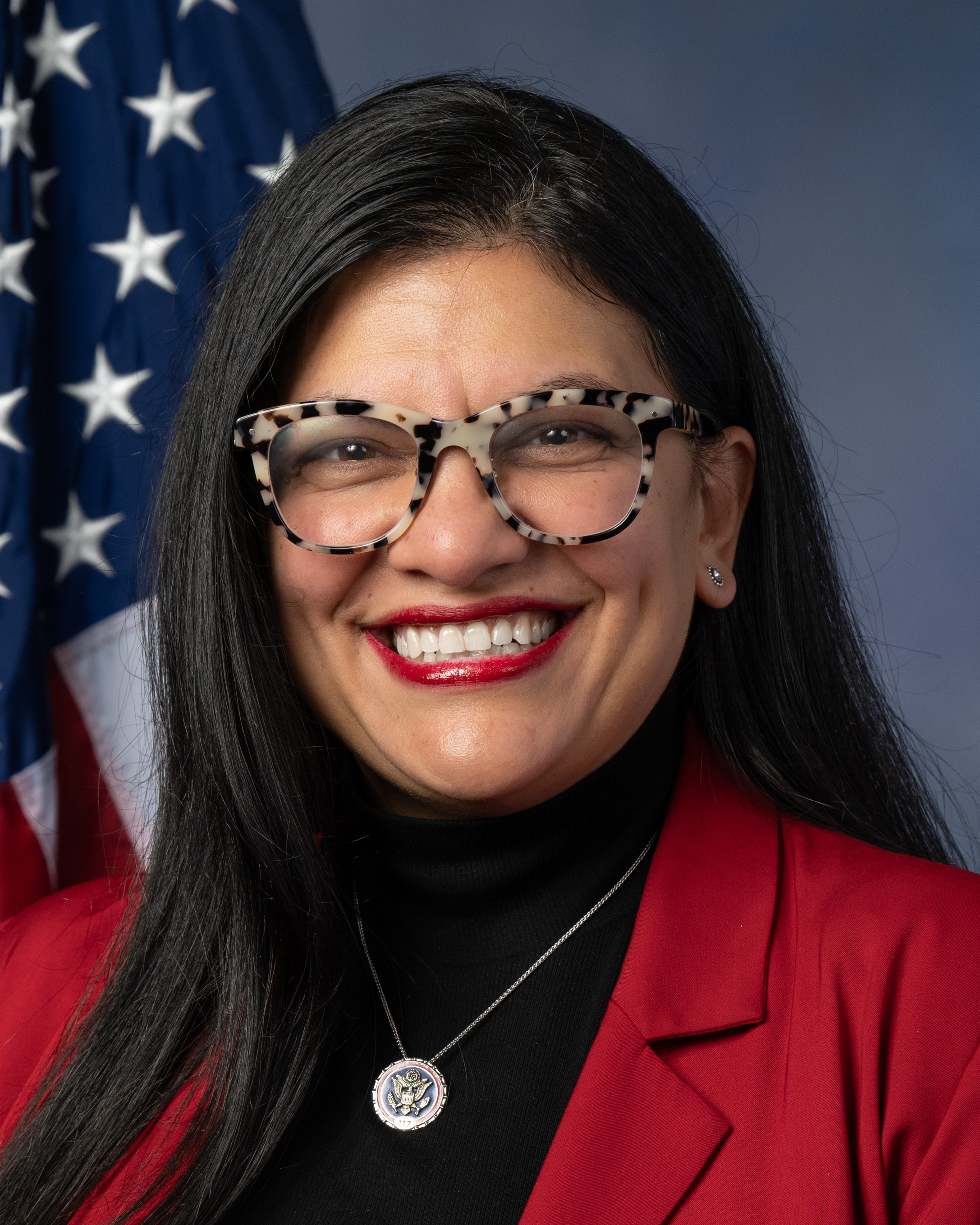

Nominee	Rashida Tlaib	James Hooper
Party	Democratic	Republican
Popular vote	247,468	69,078
Percentage	75.97%	21.20%
U.S. representative before election
Rashida Tlaib
Democratic
Elected U.S. representative
Rashida Tlaib
Democratic

The 12th district is based in northern Wayne County and includes the cities of Dearborn and Southfield. The incumbent is Democrat Rashida Tlaib, who was re-elected with 69.7% of the vote in 2024.

=== Democratic primary ===
==== Nominee ====
- Rashida Tlaib, incumbent U.S. representative (2019–present)

==== Eliminated in primary ====
- Shanelle Jackson, former state representative from the 9th district (2007–2012), candidate for the 13th district in 2012 and 2018, and candidate for this district in 2022
- Byron Nolen, mayor of Inkster (2015–2019, 2023–present)

==== Declined ====
- Fred Durhal III, former Detroit city councilor from the 7th district (2021–present) and candidate for mayor of Detroit in 2025
- Joe Tate, former speaker of the Michigan House of Representatives (2023–2025) from the 9th district (2019–present) (ran for U.S. Senate)

==== Endorsements ====
Shanelle Jackson

Organizations

- Michigan Democratic Party Jewish Caucus

Newspapers

- The Detroit News (Democratic primary only)
- Michigan Chronicle
Rashida Tlaib

Labor unions

- Michigan Education Association
- National Nurses United

Organizations

- CAIR Action
- Democratic Socialists of America
- Emgage Action
- End Citizens United
- Justice Democrats
- Metro Detroit Democratic Socialists of America
- Michigan Democratic Party Progressive Caucus
- New American Leaders Action Fund
- PAL PAC
- Peace Action
- Planned Parenthood Action Fund
- Progressive Democrats of America
- Reproductive Freedom for All
- Sierra Club
- Track AIPAC
- US Campaign for Palestinian Rights Action

Political parties

- Working Families Party

==== Fundraising ====
Campaign finance reports as of July 15, 2026
Candidate	Raised	Spent	Cash on hand
Byron Nolen	$111,846 (Note: $45,600 of this total has been self-funded by Nolen)	$111,846	$0
Rashida Tlaib (D)	$2,756,214	$3,585,336	$3,434,433
Source: Federal Election Commission

==== Results ====
Democratic primary
Party	Candidate	Votes	%
Democratic	Rashida Tlaib (incumbent)	102,707	73.92
Democratic	Shanelle Jackson	23,419	16.85
Democratic	Byron Nolen	12,828	9.23
Total votes		138,954	100.0

=== Republican primary ===
==== Nominee ====
- James D. Hooper, tradesman, candidate for this district in 2022, and nominee in 2024

==== Withdrawn ====
- Steven Elliott, laser treatment business owner, nominee for this district in 2022, and disqualified candidate for this district in 2024 (switched to the 10th district)

==== Fundraising ====
Campaign finance reports as of July 15, 2026
Candidate	Raised	Spent	Cash on hand
James D. Hooper (R)	$775	$1,410	$8,381
Source: Federal Election Commission

==== Results ====
Republican primary results
Party	Candidate	Votes	%
Republican	James D. Hooper	24,610	100.0
Total votes		24,610	100.0

=== General election ===
==== Predictions ====
Source	Ranking	As of
Decision Desk HQ	Safe D	July 14, 2026
The Cook Political Report	Solid D	May 13, 2026
Inside Elections	Solid D	May 21, 2026
Sabato's Crystal Ball	Safe D	May 26, 2026
The Economist	Safe D	May 22, 2026

==== Post-primary endorsements ====
Rashida Tlaib (D)

Labor unions

- American Federation of Government Employees
- Michigan AFL-CIO
- National Education Association

Newspapers

- Detroit Free Press
Declined to endorse

Newspapers

- The Detroit News

==== Fundraising ====
Campaign finance reports as of October 14, 2026
Candidate	Raised	Spent	Cash on hand
Rashida Tlaib (D)	$3,255,577	$4,480,958	$3,038,173
James D. Hooper (R)	$2,002	$3,249	$7,241
Source: Federal Election Commission

==== Results ====
2026 Michigan's 12th congressional district election results
Party	Candidate	Votes	%	±%
Democratic	Rashida Tlaib (incumbent)	247,468	75.97	+6.27
Republican	James Hooper	69,078	21.20	−4.20
Working Class	Gary Walkowicz	3,779	1.16	−1.44
Green	Brenda K. Sanders	3,379	1.04	−1.26
U.S. Taxpayers	Marc Sosnowski	2,041	0.63	+0.63
Total votes		325,745	100.0	
Democratic hold				

== District 13 ==
2026 Michigan's 13th congressional district election
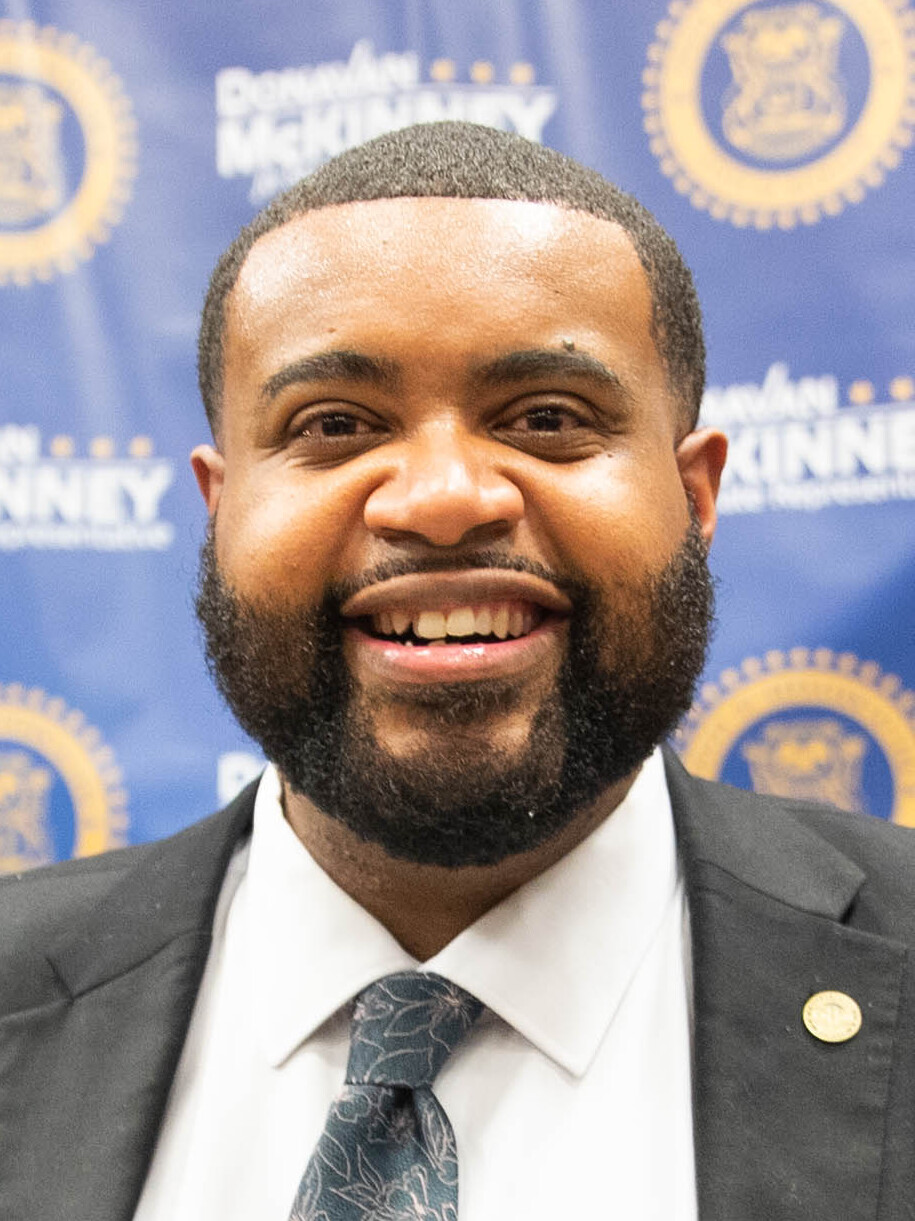

Nominee	Donavan McKinney	T.P. Nykoriak
Party	Democratic	Republican
Popular vote	210,380	54,516
Percentage	76.52%	19.83%
U.S. representative before election
Shri Thanedar
Democratic
Elected U.S. representative
Donavan McKinney
Democratic

The 13th district is based solely in Wayne County and includes most of Detroit and the cities of Taylor and Romulus. The incumbent is Democrat Shri Thanedar, who was re-elected with 68.6% of the vote in 2024.

=== Democratic primary ===
==== Nominee ====
- Donavan McKinney, state representative from the 11th district (2023–present)

==== Eliminated in primary ====
- Shri Thanedar, incumbent U.S. representative (2023–present)

==== Disqualified ====
- John Goci, former Wayne-Westland school board member and candidate for this district in 2012
- Mary Waters, at-large Detroit city councilor (2022–present), former state representative from the 4th district (2001–2006), candidate for this district in 2008 and 2024, and candidate for the 14th district in 2012 (ran a write-in campaign)

==== Withdrawn ====
- Nazmul Hassan, vice chair of the Michigan Democratic Party (ran for WSU Board of Governors)
- Adam Hollier, former state senator from the 2nd district (2018–2022) and candidate for this district in 2022 and 2024 (ran for state senate)

==== Declined ====
- Joe Tate, former speaker of the Michigan House of Representatives (2023–2025) from the 9th district (2019–present) (ran for U.S. Senate)

==== Endorsements ====
Donavan McKinney

U.S. senators

- Bernie Sanders, Vermont (2007–present) (Independent)

U.S. representatives

- Joyce Beatty, OH-03 (2013–present)
- Steven Horsford, NV-04 (2013–2015, 2019–present)
- Brenda Lawrence, former MI-14 (2015–2023)
- Summer Lee, PA-12 (2023–present)
- Andy Levin, former MI-9 (2019–2023)
- Ilhan Omar, MN-05 (2019–present)
- Ayanna Pressley, MA-07 (2019–present)
- Lateefah Simon, CA-12 (2025–present)
- Rashida Tlaib, MI-12 (2023–present)

Statewide officials

- Garlin Gilchrist, lieutenant governor of Michigan (2019–present)

State legislators

- Darrin Camilleri, SD-4 (2023–present)
- Stephanie Chang, SD-3 (2019–present)
- John Daniel Cherry, SD-27 (2023–present)
- Kevin Hertel, SD-12 (2023–present)
- Jeff Irwin, SD-15 (2019–present)
- Veronica Klinefelt, SD-11 (2023–present)
- Chris Rabb, Pennsylvania's HD-200 (2017–present) and 2026 Democratic nominee for PA-3
- Claire Valdez, New York's AD-37 (2025–present) and 2026 Democratic nominee for NY-7
- Paul Wojno, SD-10 (2019–present)
- 16 state representatives

Local officials

- Abdul El-Sayed, former Wayne County health director (2023–2025) and candidate for U.S. senator from Michigan in 2026
- Warren Evans, Wayne County executive (2015–present)
- Alex Garza, Wayne County commissioner from the 14th district (2024–present)
- Brad Lander, former New York City comptroller (2022–2025) and 2026 Democratic nominee for NY-10

Party officials

- David Hogg, former vice chair of the Democratic National Committee (2025)

Individuals

- Darializa Avila Chevalier, community organizer and 2026 Democratic nominee for NY-13
- Adam Hamawy, surgeon and 2026 Democratic nominee for NJ-12
- Melat Kiros, attorney and 2026 Democratic nominee for CO-1
- Ms. Rachel, YouTuber and children's educator
- Horace Sheffield III, minister and media personality

Labor unions

- Michigan AFL-CIO
- Michigan Education Association
- National Nurses United
- Service Employees International Union Michigan

Organizations

- A New Policy PAC
- CAIR Action
- Center for Biological Diversity Action Fund
- Christopher Street Project
- Climate Hawks Vote
- Democratic Socialists of America
- Emgage Action
- Food & Water Action
- Friends of the Earth Action
- Gen-Z for Change
- Indivisible
- Justice Democrats
- Leaders We Deserve
- League of Conservation Voters
- Metro Detroit Democratic Socialists of America
- Michigan Democratic Party Black Caucus
- Michigan Democratic Party Progressive Caucus
- Our Revolution
- Patriotic Millionaires
- Peace Action
- Progressive Change Campaign Committee
- Progressive Democrats of America
- Sierra Club
- Sunrise Movement
- Track AIPAC
- US Campaign for Palestinian Rights Action

Political parties

- Working Families Party

Newspapers

- Michigan Chronicle
Shri Thanedar

U.S. representatives

- Pete Aguilar, CA-33 (2015–present)
- Judy Chu, CA-28 (2009–present)
- Katherine Clark, House minority whip (2023–present) from MA-05 (2013–present)
- Emanuel Cleaver MO-5 (2005–present)
- Cleo Fields, LA-6 (1993–1997, 2025–present)
- Hakeem Jeffries, House minority leader (2023–present) from NY-08 (2013–present)
- Raja Krishnamoorthi, IL-8 (2017–present)
- Joe Neguse, CO-2 (2019–present)
- Greg Stanton, AZ-4 (2019–present)
- Bennie Thompson, MS-02 (1993–present)

Organizations

- 314 Action
- AIPAC
- Animal Wellness Action
- Democratic Majority for Israel
- Joint Action Committee for Political Affairs
- Planned Parenthood Action Fund

Newspapers

- The Detroit News (Democratic primary only)

==== Fundraising ====
Italics indicate a withdrawn candidate.

Campaign finance reports as of July 15, 2026
Candidate	Raised	Spent	Cash on hand
Nazmul Hassan (D)	$7,745	$7,745	$0
Adam Hollier (D)	$296,148	$494,321	$0
Donavan McKinney (D)	$1,372,308	$1,229,455	$142,853
Shri Thanedar (D)	$390,276 (Note: $2.15 million of this total has been self-funded by Thanedar)	$2,265,605	$5,029,239
Source: Federal Election Commission

==== Polling ====
Poll source	Date(s) administered	Sample size	Margin of error	Donavan McKinney	Shri Thanedar	Undecided
Data for Progress (D) (Note: Poll sponsored by Justice Democrats, which supports McKinney)	July 9–15, 2026	324 (LV)	± 5.0%	42%	46%	12%

==== Results ====
Results by precinct McKinney: 40–50%; 50–60%; 60–70%; 70–80%; 80–90%; Thanedar: 40–50%; 50–60%; 60–70%; 100%; Tie: 40–50%

Democratic primary results
Party	Candidate	Votes	%
Democratic	Donavan McKinney	57,746	51.70
Democratic	Shri Thanedar (incumbent)	53,522	47.91
Write-in		436	0.39
Total votes		111,704	100.0

=== Republican primary ===
==== Nominee ====
- T.P. Nykoriak, international trade analyst and perennial candidate

==== Disqualified ====
- Martell D. Bivings, policy analyst and nominee for this district in 2022 and 2024
- Raphiel King

==== Fundraising ====
Campaign finance reports as of June 30, 2026
Candidate	Raised	Spent	Cash on hand
Martell D. Bivings (R)	$0.01	$486	$14,940
Source: Federal Election Commission

==== Results ====
Republican primary results
Party	Candidate	Votes	%
Republican	T.P. Nykoriak	18,478	99.48
Write-in		96	0.52
Total votes		18,574	100.0

==== Fundraising ====
Campaign finance reports as of June 30, 2026
Candidate	Raised	Spent	Cash on hand
Maurice Morton (I)	$133,714 (Note: $45,000 of this total has been self-funded by Morton)	$117,545	$16,168
Source: Federal Election Commission

=== General election ===
==== Predictions ====
Source	Ranking	As of
Decision Desk HQ	Safe D	July 14, 2026
The Cook Political Report	Solid D	May 13, 2026
Inside Elections	Solid D	May 21, 2026
Sabato's Crystal Ball	Safe D	May 26, 2026
The Economist	Safe D	May 22, 2026

==== Post-primary endorsements ====
Donavan McKinney (D)

U.S. representatives

- Greg Casar, TX-35 (2023–present)
- Maxwell Frost, FL-10 (2023–present)
- Pramila Jayapal, WA-7 (2017–present)

Labor unions

- American Association of University Professors
- American Federation of Government Employees
- National Education Association

Organizations

- Congressional Progressive Caucus
- End Citizens United
- Jane Fonda Climate PAC
- Voters of Tomorrow

Newspapers

- The Detroit News

==== Fundraising ====
Campaign finance reports as of October 14, 2026
Candidate	Raised	Spent	Cash on hand
Donavan McKinney (D)	$1,876,779	$1,747,106	$129,673
Source: Federal Election Commission

==== Polling ====
Poll source	Date(s) administered	Sample size	Margin of error	Donavan McKinney (D)	T.P. Nykoriak (R)	Other	Undecided
Center for Strategic Politics (D) (Note: Poll commissioned by the Democratic Socialists of America’s National Electoral Commission)	October 28–30, 2026	310 (LV)	± 5.57%	69%	19%	4% (Note: "Would not vote for this office" with 2%; Simone Coleman (WCP) & Chris Dardzinski (UST) with 1%)	8%

==== Results ====
2026 Michigan's 13th congressional district election results
Party	Candidate	Votes	%	±%
Democratic	Donavan McKinney	210,380	76.52	+7.92
Republican	T.P. Nykoriak	54,516	19.83	−4.67
Working Class	Simone Coleman	5,760	2.10	−2.13
U.S. Taxpayers	Chris Dardzinski	2,670	0.97	+0.08
Green	Raelyn Light	1,554	0.57	+0.57
Write-in		43	0.01	±0.00
Total votes		274,923	100.00	
Democratic hold				

== Notes ==
Partisan clients
