= Christina Hines =

American politician, prosecutor (born 1989)

- Official portrait, 2026

Member-elect of the U.S. House of Representatives from Michigan's 10th district
- Assuming office January 3, 2027
- Succeeding: John James

Personal details
- Born: December 11, 1989 (age 36) Detroit, Michigan, U.S.
- Party: Democratic
- Children: 3
- Education: University of Michigan (BA); Wayne State University (JD)

Christina Bertrand Hines (born December 11, 1989) is an American prosecutor and politician. A member of the Democratic Party, she is the U.S. representative-elect for Michigan's 10th congressional district after winning the 2026 election.

== Early life ==
Hines was born on December 11, 1989, in Detroit, Michigan, and grew up in Macomb County. She graduated from Wayne State University Law School and afterwards worked as a prosecutor, first working for the Wayne County Prosecutor's General Trials Unit and later for the Washtenaw County Prosecutor's Office as chief of the special victims unit division.

== Political career ==
Hines ran for Macomb County Prosecutor as a member of the Democratic Party in 2024. She was defeated by incumbent Peter Lucido in the general election, receiving 43% of the vote.

In April 2025, Hines launched her campaign for the United States House of Representatives for Michigan's 10th congressional district, an open seat after John James decided to run for governor. She won the primary over Eric Chung and Tim Greimel and faced Republican candidate Michael Bouchard Jr. in the 2026 general election, which she won.

== Personal life ==
Hines is married and has three children.

U.S. House of Representatives
Preceded by John James	Member of the U.S. House of Representatives from Michigan's 10th congressional district Taking office 2027	Elect
