= Emgage =

Muslim American political advocacy group

- Emgage
- Formation: January 15, 2006
- Purpose: Muslim American civic engagement, voter education, political advocacy
- Headquarters: Washington, D.C.
- Key people: Wa'el Alzayat (CEO), Iman Awad (deputy director), Farooq Mitha
- Affiliations: Emgage Action, Emgage PAC, Emgage Foundation
- Website: emgageusa.org

Emgage is a family of organizations that seeks to empower Muslim Americans through political literacy and civic engagement. Its national headquarters is in Washington, D.C., and has state chapters in Michigan, Texas, Florida, Virginia, Pennsylvania, and New York. It consists of Emgage, a civic engagement organization, Emgage Action, an issue advocacy organization, and Emgage PAC, the largest Muslim American political action committee (PAC).

In early 2020, the organization launched its Million Muslim Votes campaign, seeking to galvanize one million Muslim American voters during the 2020 presidential elections. In doing so, Emgage Action hosted then-candidate Joe Biden to speak at its Million Muslim Votes summit. This marked Biden's first address to Muslim American communities, during which he famously vowed to end the Muslim ban on the first day of his presidency.

The organization met its goal for the Million Muslim Votes campaign, with Muslim American voters turning out in unprecedented numbers in key battleground states, including Michigan and Pennsylvania.

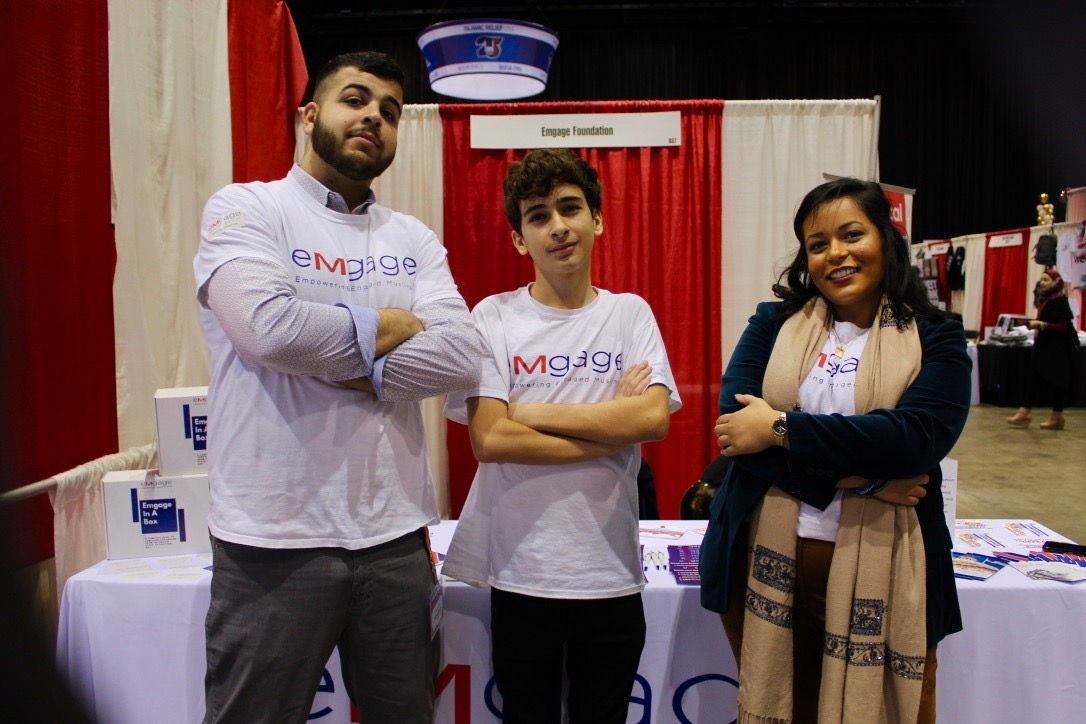
Emgage training young Muslim Americans to become politically engaged

== Emgage Action ==
Emgage Action has worked on various policy issues, including repealing of the Muslim Ban, fighting for human rights for Uyghur Muslims, imposing sanctions against military leaders responsible for violence against Rohingya and other minorities in Burma, advocating to address hate crimes and racial supremacy, and promoting rights and freedoms for Palestinians in occupied Palestine.

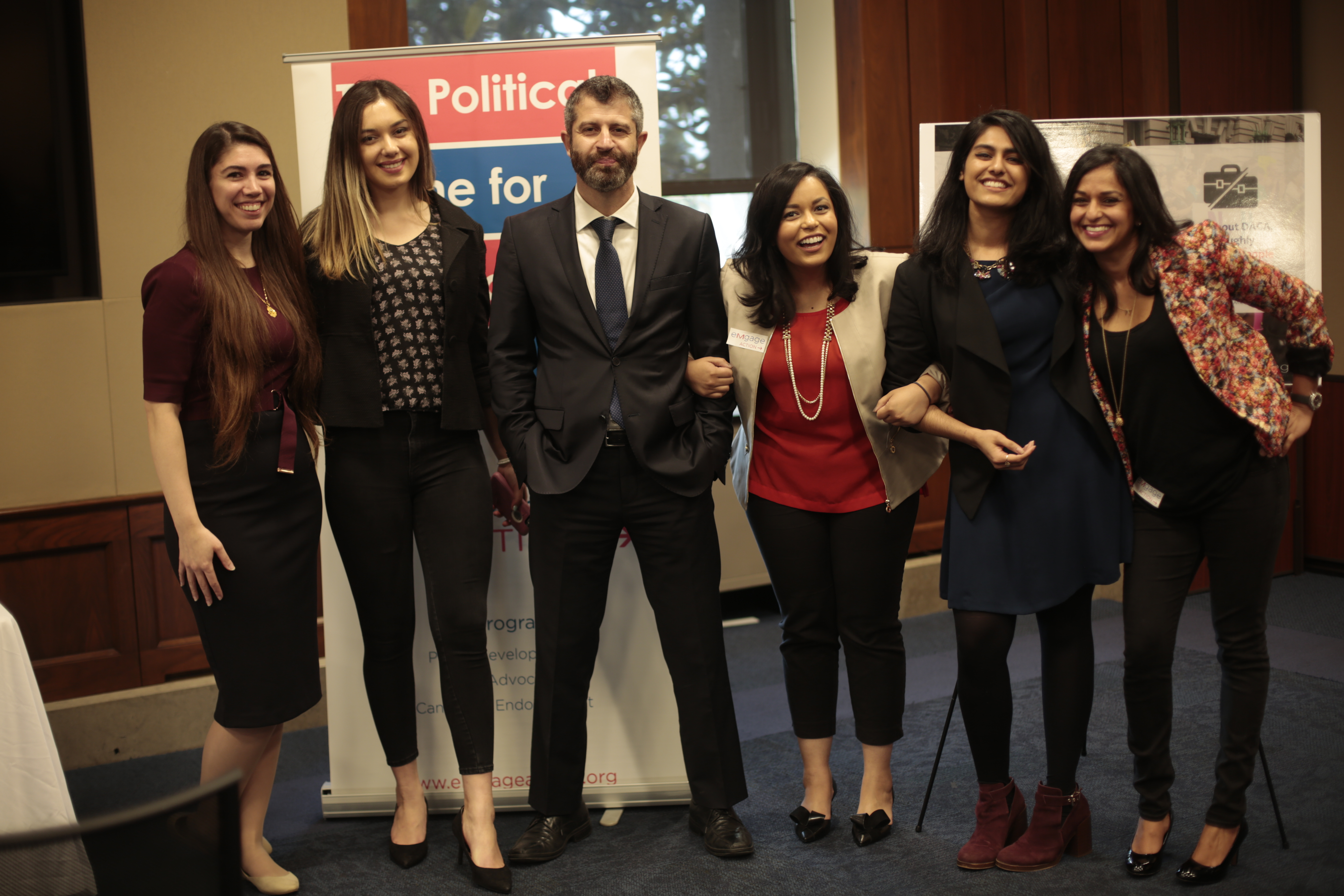
Emgage engages with elected officials.

Key legislation that the organization has endorsed, and in some cases, helped pass, include the NO BAN Act, Uyghur Human Rights Policy Act, Uyghur Forced Labor Prevention Act, Burma Act, No Hate Act, and Promoting Human Rights by Ending Israeli Military Detention of Palestinian Children Act.

The organization spearheaded a coalition letter that sought to remove Mark Kevin Lloyd, President Donald Trump's appointee as religious freedom adviser at the U.S. Agency for International Development (USAID), due to several comments that were considered Islamophobic. This letter was obtained by Time; subsequently, then-candidate Joe Biden condemned Lloyd, stating, "Islamophobia is a pernicious disease. It does not belong in the halls of government."

== Emgage PAC ==
During the 2020 United States presidential election, Emgage PAC endorsed Senator Bernie Sanders in the Democratic primaries. CEO of Emgage PAC, Wa'el Alzayat, stated, "Senator Sanders has built a historically inclusive and forward-thinking movement: one that represents America as a set of ideas grounded in the belief that all humans are equal and worthy of a dignified life. Our endorsement is intended to galvanize Muslim Americans at the polls to ensure that our voices are heard."

After Senator Sanders withdrew, the organization endorsed Joe Biden.

Aside from presidential endorsements, Emgage PAC has made hundreds of endorsements at other national, state, and local levels. In 2020, the organization endorsed Rashida Tlaib for her re-election during the Michigan primaries, and made above 70,000 calls and 460,000 text messages to ensure her victory. Nada Al-Hanooti, the executive director of Emgage PAC's Michigan chapter, stated, "Rep. Rashida Tlaib has consistently worked for the attainment of justice and equality for all peoples, and we are confident that she will continue to do so after her victory today. Emgage PAC is incredibly proud to have endorsed and supported such a trailblazer, who has served as one of the first Muslim women in Congress with resilience and grace."

Emgage PAC created the Muslim American Executive Selection Committee, which seeks to identify and recommend qualified Muslim Americans to serve in the Biden administration. The goal of this effort was to increase the number of Muslim Americans serving in government at all levels.

In 2024 the PAC endorses Kamala Harris despite her stance on the war in Gaza.

== Criticism ==
Emgage has been criticized by Muslim organizations, including the U.S. Council of Muslim Organizations, the umbrella organization for Muslim advocacy groups in the US for its ties to groups involved in anti-Muslim and anti-Palestinian activity and which attack elected Muslim lawmakers like Ilhan Omar. After these went unaddressed, the Council severed ties with Emgage. Emgage denied the accusations, which it described as a product of "ideological cancel culture".
