= Michigan Education Association =

Labor union

The Michigan Education Association (MEA), headquartered in East Lansing, Michigan, is a labor union representing more than 157,000 teachers, faculty and education support staff throughout the state. Usually referred to as a “teachers' union” its membership also includes college faculty, public school custodians, bus drivers, and paraprofessionals, among others. It represents people working in neighborhood public schools, those in charter schools as well as school employees working for private companies.

While MEA works to serve its members’ employment goals, it also promotes public education. It sees these goals as closely related. Through policies put in place by its elected Board of Directors, MEA advocates for policies it judges to be best for student success, for civil rights and for the quality of life for all. Like other public sector unions, the MEA has come under fire in recent years for its defense of teacher employment protections. Controversy over the role of the MEA is part of a wider debate on the structure and funding of public education in Michigan and around the United States.

== History ==
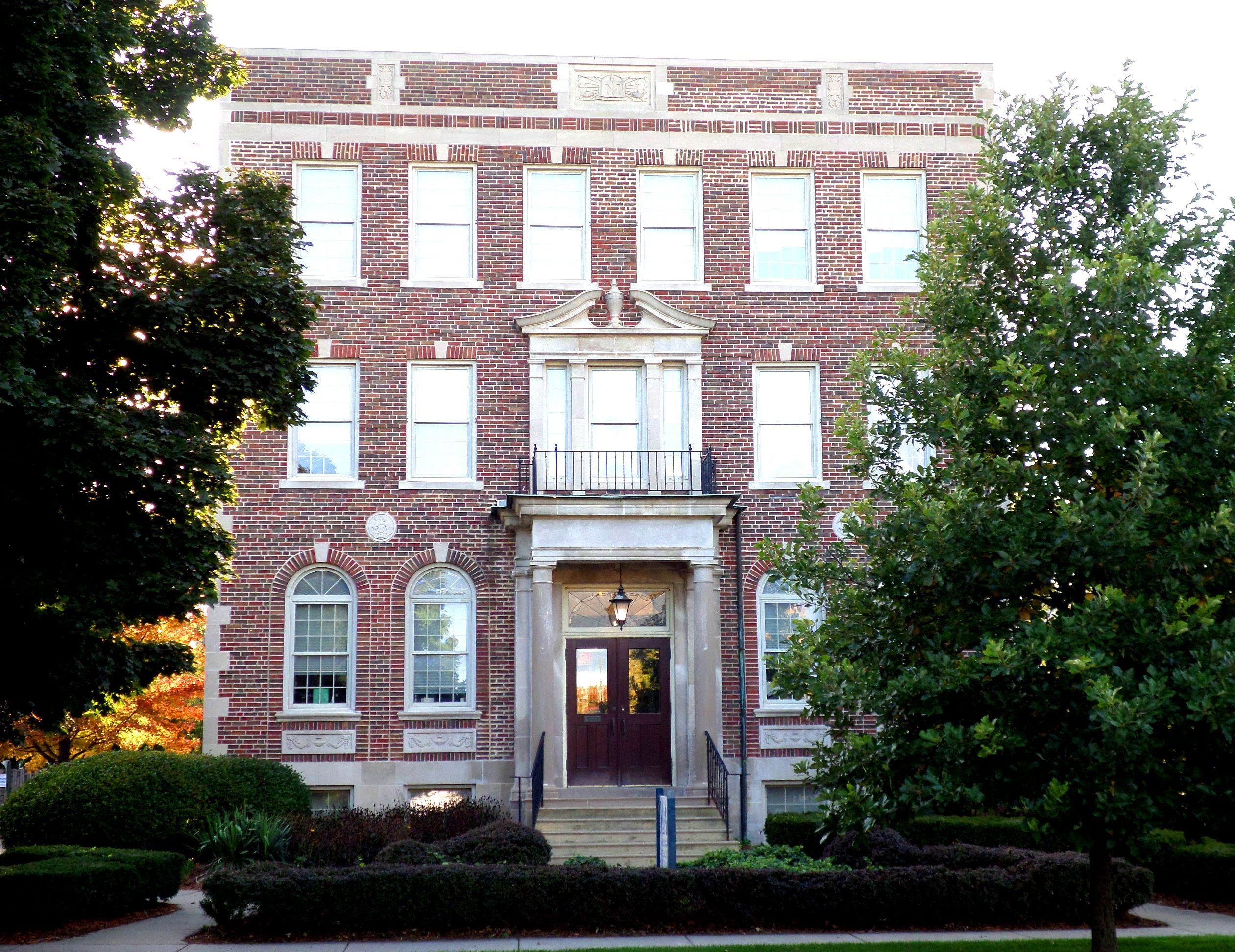
The former MEA headquarters building in Lansing, built in 1928, is listed as a Michigan State Historic Site

MEA was founded in 1852 as the Michigan State Teachers Association, five years before the National Education Association was organized, becoming the Michigan Education Association in 1926.

In 1937 the MEA's governing body, the Representative Assembly, authorized the development of a group hospitalization program. This was one of the first such health care programs in the United States. Two years later, the Hoosier Casualty Company provided coverage for MEA members, administrated by local insurance agent Herman Henkel.

Michigan law forbade the MEA from acting as an agent for its members, so when Henkel retired in 1960, it was decided that a separate non-profit corporation would serve this function, and Michigan Education Special Services Association (MESSA) was born. 10,000 MEA members were enrolled at the time.

Tax-exempt under IRS 501(c)(9), MESSA qualified as a “voluntary employees’ beneficiary association” and could therefore offer group term life, health, and dental coverages, among others, to its members.

When the Michigan bargaining law was enacted in 1965, public school employees were able to organize into local bargaining units to negotiate salary, benefits and other working conditions. Insurance became a bargainable issue. In 1984, MEA merged with the Michigan Educational Support Personnel, making MEA one of the first state associations to represent both teachers and other school personnel. In 2007, MEA membership exceeded 160,000.

== Controversy ==
The MEA made national news when it defended the head of its West-Branch Rose affiliate, convicted child molester Neal Erickson. Several West-Branch MEA affiliate teachers and one of their spouses-who was a board member-wrote letters of support of Erickson, who was found guilty of raping a young boy and had been sentenced to 15–30 years in prison. The presiding judge called the union members' support, "A slap in the eye." The MEA was further criticized after it filed a grievance with the school district, trying to collect severance pay for Erickson.
