= NO BAN Act =

- Long title: To transfer and limit Executive Branch authority to suspend or restrict the entry of a class of aliens.
- Announced in: the 117th United States Congress
- Number of co-sponsors: 159

Legislative history
- Introduced in the House of Representatives as H.R. 1333 by Judy Chu (D–CA) on February 25, 2021; Committee consideration by House Judiciary, House Foreign Affairs, House Homeland Security and House Intelligence; Passed the House on March 21, 2021 (218–208)

The NO BAN Act is a proposed United States law that would limit presidential authority to suspend or restrict the entry of non-citizens into the United States as well as expand nondiscrimination provisions in federal immigration law.

The bill would amend key sections of the Immigration and Nationality Act of 1952 to place procedural constraints on executive actions affecting entry into the country, while increasing congressional oversight and allowing for judicial review of such decisions.

== Background ==
The legislation was introduced in response to the use of presidential authority during the first administration of Donald Trump, who undertook several executive actions restricting entry into the United States by certain foreign nationals. Trump's travel bans restricted entry for nationals of multiple predominantly Muslim-majority countries, as well as certain other states, and were upheld in part by the U.S. Supreme Court in Trump v. Hawaii.

== Provisions ==
The bill extends protections to cover not only immigrant visas but also nonimmigrant visas, entry decisions, and other immigration benefits, prohibiting discrimination based on characteristics such as religion.

The legislation focuses on revising Section 212(f), which allows the president to suspend or restrict the entry of non-citizens. Under the bill, this authority would remain in place but be subject to defined constraints: any restriction must be based on specific and credible evidence, tied to a compelling government interest such as national security or public safety, and narrowly tailored in scope and duration. The bill also requires consideration of waivers, particularly for family reunification and humanitarian cases.

In addition, the Act introduces new reporting and oversight requirements. The executive branch would be required to consult with Congress prior to imposing restrictions and submit detailed reports shortly afterward, including the scope, justification, and expected impact of the action. Failure to meet these requirements would result in the automatic termination of the restriction. The bill also provides for judicial review, allowing affected individuals to challenge actions taken under the revised authority.

== Legislative history ==
As of April 28, 2021:

Congress	Short title	Bill number(s)	Date introduced	Sponsor(s)	# of cosponsors	Latest status
116th Congress	NO BAN Act of 2019	H.R. 2214	April 10, 2019	Judy Chu (D-CA)	219	Died in committee
116th Congress	NO BAN Act of 2019	S. 1123	April 10, 2019	Christopher Coons (D-DE)	41	Died in committee
117th Congress	NO BAN Act of 2021	H.R. 1333	February 25, 2021	Judy Chu (D-CA)	159	Passed in the House (218-208).
117th Congress	NO BAN Act of 2021	S.1891	May 27, 2021	Christopher Coons (D-DE)	42	Referred to committees of jurisdiction.

== See also ==
- List of bills in the 116th United States Congress
- List of bills in the 117th United States Congress
