= Vote Mama =

PAC and organization that helps women with small children run for office

Logo of the organization

Vote Mama is an American progressive political action committee and foundation aimed at helping mothers with young children run for office as Democrats.

Founded in 2018 by Liuba Grechen Shirley, a congressional candidate from New York, the committee focuses on supporting progressive young mothers running for office.

In order to be endorsed by the committee, "candidates must be Democrats who support abortion rights, paid family leave, universal pre-K, along with special attention paid to other issues that matter to working families."

Senator Elizabeth Warren filmed the group's launch video. Hillary Clinton headlined its launch event in 2019.

In 2021, it launched a campaign to pass campaign funds for child care in all 50 states by 2023. It also launched a survey to find out what lawmakers' childcare needs are.

The group's endorsement of Sabina Matos in Rhode Island's 2023 special election was somewhat controversial because its rules state that it would not endorse candidates in races with more than one mother running.
