= 2028 United States House of Representatives elections =

House elections for the 121st U.S. Congress

2028 United States House of Representative elections
- November 7, 2028

All 435 seats in the United States House of Representatives (Note: As well as five of the six non-voting delegates.) 218 seats needed for a majority
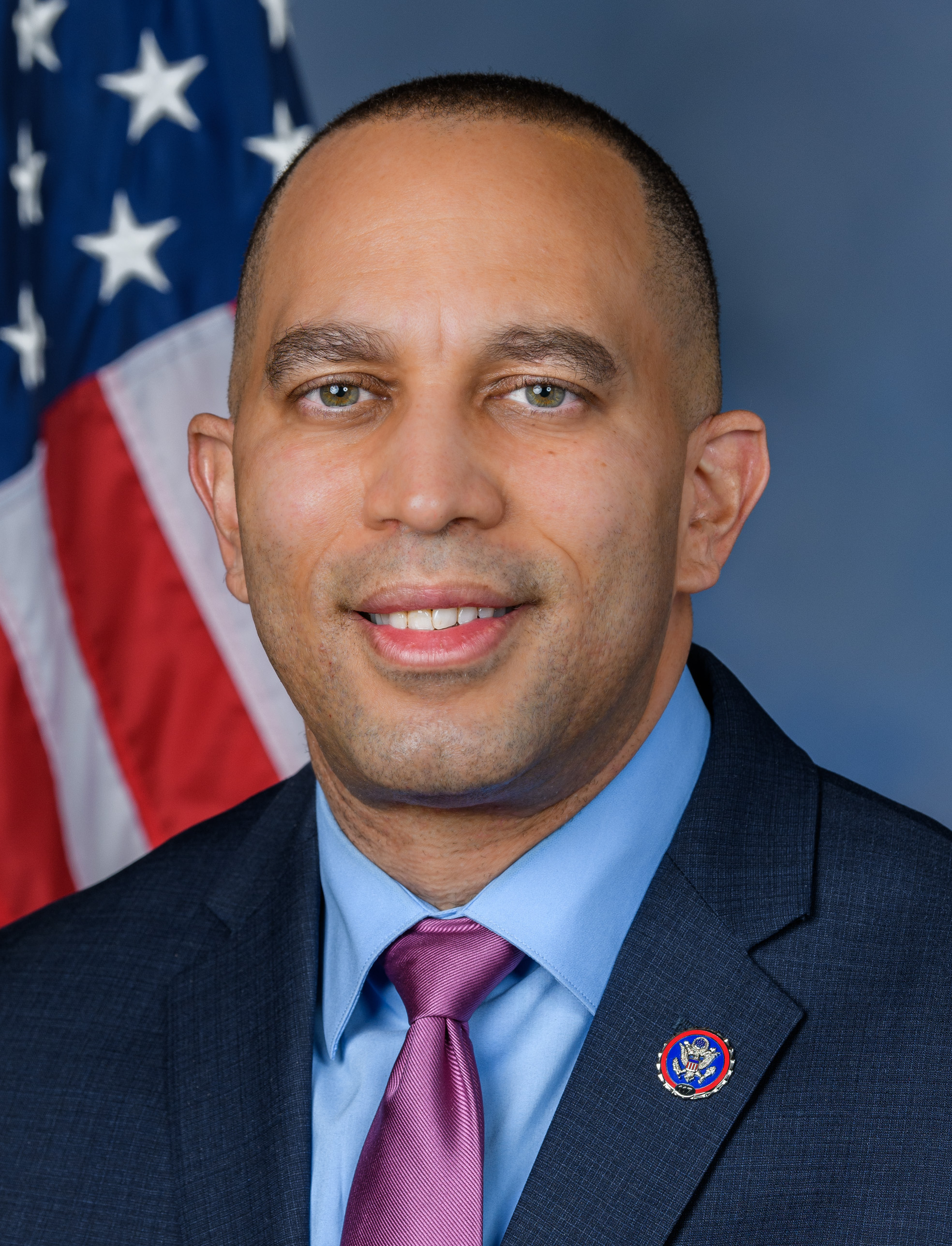

Leader	Hakeem Jeffries	Jim Jordan
Party	Democratic	Republican
Leader since	January 3, 2023	January 3, 2027
Leader's seat	New York 8th	Ohio 4th
Last election	259 seats, 56.2%	173 seats, 42.3%
Current seats	259	173
Seats needed	Steady	▲45
- Democratic incumbent Democratic incumbent retiring Republican incumbent Republican incumbent retiring TBD in 2026
Incumbent Speaker
TBD
Democratic

The 2028 United States House of Representatives elections are scheduled to be held on Tuesday, November 7, 2028, as part of the 2028 United States elections during President Donald Trump's second nonconsecutive term. Voters will elect representatives from all 435 congressional districts across each of the fifty U.S. states, and five of the six non-voting delegates from the District of Columbia and the inhabited U.S. territories.

The elections will be held together with other federal, state, and local elections, including the U.S. presidential election and elections to the Senate, as part of the 2028 United States elections.

== Retirements ==
As of November 2026, one representative (a Republican), has announced their intention to not seek re-election, instead seeking another public office.

=== Republicans ===
1. Tennessee 2: Tim Burchett is retiring to run for the U.S. Senate.

== Crossover seats ==
=== Democratic ===
There are 59 districts won by Donald Trump in the 2024 presidential election that are represented by Democrats.

District	Incumbent						
Location	Member	Party	First elected	2026 PVI	Trump margin of victory in 2024	Incumbent margin of victory in 2026	Result
Alabama 2	Shomari Figures	Democratic	2024	R+7	R+14.3	TBD	TBD
Arizona 1	Amish Shah	Democratic	2026	R+1	R+3.1	TBD	TBD
Arizona 6	JoAnna Mendoza	Democratic	2026	EVEN	R+0.7	TBD	TBD
California 22	Randy Villegas	Democratic	2026	D+1	R+1.8	TBD	TBD
Colorado 4	Eileen Laubacher	Democratic	2026	R+9	R+18.6	TBD	TBD
Colorado 5	Jessica Killin	Democratic	2026	R+5	R+9.1	TBD	TBD
Colorado 8	Manny Rutinel	Democratic	2026	EVEN	R+1.9	TBD	TBD
Florida 9	Darren Soto	Democratic	2016	R+8	R+17.7	TBD	TBD
Florida 14	Kathy Castor	Democratic	2006	R+4	R+10.5	TBD	TBD
Florida 22	Pia Dandiya	Democratic	2026	R+4	R+10.5	TBD	TBD
Florida 25	Jared Moskowitz	Democratic	2022	R+3	R+9.2	TBD	TBD
Indiana 5	J. D. Ford	Democratic	2026	R+8	R+16.8	TBD	TBD
Iowa 1	Christina Bohannan	Democratic	2026	R+4	R+8.4	TBD	TBD
Iowa 2	Lindsay James	Democratic	2026	R+4	R+9.9	TBD	TBD
Iowa 3	Sarah Trone Garriott	Democratic	2026	R+2	R+4.4	TBD	TBD
Kentucky 6	Zach Dembo	Democratic	2026	R+7	R+15.0	TBD	TBD
Michigan 4	Sean McCann	Democratic	2026	R+3	R+5.5	TBD	TBD
Michigan 7	William Lawrence	Democratic	2026	EVEN	R+1.6	TBD	TBD
Michigan 8	Kristen McDonald Rivet	Democratic	2024	R+1	R+2.0	TBD	TBD
Michigan 10	Christina Hines	Democratic	2026	R+3	R+6.7	TBD	TBD
Minnesota 1	Jake Johnson	Democratic	2026	R+6	R+12.0	TBD	TBD
Missouri 2	Fred Wellman	Democratic	2026	R+4	R+7.9	TBD	TBD
Montana 1	Sam Forstag	Democratic	2026	R+5	R+7.5	TBD	TBD
Nevada 2	Teresa Benitez-Thompson	Democratic	2026	R+7	R+13.9	TBD	TBD
Nevada 3	Susie Lee	Democratic	2018	D+1	R+0.7	TBD	TBD
New Jersey 2	Zack Mullock	Democratic	2026	R+5	R+12.6	TBD	TBD
New Jersey 7	Rebecca Bennett	Democratic	2026	EVEN	R+1.1	TBD	TBD
New Jersey 9	Nellie Pou	Democratic	2024	D+2	R+1.2	TBD	TBD
New Mexico 2	Gabe Vasquez	Democratic	2026	EVEN	R+1.9	TBD	TBD
New York 3	Tom Suozzi	Democratic	2016; 2022 (retired); 2024 (special)	EVEN	R+4.3	TBD	TBD
North Carolina 1	Don Davis	Democratic	2022	R+5	R+11.6	TBD	TBD
North Carolina 3	Raymond Smith Jr.	Democratic	2026	R+6	R+13.6	TBD	TBD
North Carolina 5	Chuck Hubbard	Democratic	2026	R+9	R+17.7	TBD	TBD
North Carolina 6	Cyril Jefferson	Democratic	2026	R+9	R+17.1	TBD	TBD
North Carolina 9	Richard Ojeda	Democratic	2026	R+8	R+15.9	TBD	TBD
North Carolina 11	Jamie Ager	Democratic	2026	R+5	R+9.5	TBD	TBD
North Carolina 13	Paul Barringer	Democratic	2026	R+8	R+16.4	TBD	TBD
North Carolina 14	LaKesha Womack	Democratic	2026	R+8	R+15.0	TBD	TBD
Ohio 1	Greg Landsman	Democratic	2022	R+1	R+1.6	TBD	TBD
Ohio 7	Brian Poindexter	Democratic	2026	R+5	R+11.0	TBD	TBD
Ohio 9	Marcy Kaptur	Democratic	1982	R+5	R+10.6	TBD	TBD
Ohio 10	Kristina Knickerbocker	Democratic	2026	R+5	R+7.8	TBD	TBD
Ohio 15	Don Leonard	Democratic	2026	R+5	R+10.0	TBD	TBD
Pennsylvania 7	Bob Brooks	Democratic	2026	R+1	R+3.2	TBD	TBD
Pennsylvania 8	Paige Cognetti	Democratic	2026	R+4	R+8.6	TBD	TBD
Pennsylvania 10	Janelle Stelson	Democratic	2026	R+3	R+5.2	TBD	TBD
South Carolina 1	Nancy Lacore	Democratic	2026	R+6	R+13.1	TBD	TBD
Tennessee 4	Victoria Broderick	Democratic	2026	R+11	R+21.1	TBD	TBD
Texas 9	Leticia Gutierrez	Democratic	2026	R+9	R+19.9	TBD	TBD
Texas 15	Bobby Pulido	Democratic	2026	R+7	R+17.9	TBD	TBD
Texas 23	Katy Padilla Stout	Democratic	2026	R+7	R+13.2	TBD	TBD
Texas 28	Henry Cuellar	Democratic	2004	R+3	R+10.4	TBD	TBD
Texas 34	Vicente Gonzalez	Democratic	2016	R+3	R+10.1	TBD	TBD
Texas 35	Johnny Garcia	Democratic	2026	R+4	R+10.4	TBD	TBD
Virginia 1	Shannon Taylor	Democratic	2026	R+3	R+4.9	TBD	TBD
Virginia 2	Elaine Luria	Democratic	2018; 2022 (lost); 2026	EVEN	R+0.2	TBD	TBD
Washington 3	Marie Gluesenkamp Perez	Democratic	2022	R+2	R+5.4	TBD	TBD
Wisconsin 1	Mitchell Berman	Democratic	2026	R+3	R+4.5	TBD	TBD
Wisconsin 3	Rebecca Cooke	Democratic	2026	R+3	R+7.3	TBD	TBD

=== Republican ===
There are no districts won by Kamala Harris in the 2024 Presidential election that are represented by Republicans.

== Mid-decade redistricting changes ==
States that had undergone mid-decade redistricting prior to the 2028 elections colored by which party was expected to benefit.: Anticipated new map; Democratic gain expected Voluntary redistricting rejected / Redistricting challenge rejected Redistricting referendum rejected

States that have undergone mid-decade redistricting prior to the 2028 elections colored by the reason for redistricting. Stripes indicate anticipated redistricting that has not been finalized or fully approved.: Voluntary redistricting enacted Voluntary redistricting rejected / Redistricting challenge rejected Redistricting referendum rejected

Several states are attempting to redistrict mid-decade for the midterms, similar to the redistricting done for the 2026 United States House of Representatives elections. In Maryland, voters approved Question 3, amending the constitution to allow the Democrats to draw out Andy Harris's seat. New York is also in the process of redistricting, although following 2026 many legislatures are reversing their positions on the issue. Governor-elect David Crowley from Wisconsin announced he would sign a bill to redistrict the state. Republicans in Mississippi are planning on redistricting prior to the 2027 state elections, eliminating the sole Democratic-held seat. Redistricting is also possible in South Carolina, Indiana, and Virginia.

Summary of mid-decade changes to congressional districts in advance of the 2028 election cycle
State (linked to summaries below)	Status	Notes	Change in partisanship (Note: Competitive seats are defined as seats won by less than 10 points by their respective party in 2024)		
State (linked to summaries below)	Status	Notes	D	C	R
Colorado	Districts left in place	After multiple Republican states redrew their congressional lines prior to 2026, Colorado citizens attempted to put forth a referendum allowing mid-decade redistricting to occur in the state after the 2026 elections. However, the Supreme Court of Colorado struck it down ending such push.	Steady	Steady	Steady
Georgia	Districts left in place	Governor Brian Kemp called a special session to redraw Georgia's congressional maps prior to the 2028 elections after the Louisiana v. Callais ruling. However, the legislature declined to redraw the boundaries. After Democrats won the governorship in 2026, Brian Kemp declined to call another special session before the new governor, Keisha Lance Bottoms, and legislature take office.	Steady	Steady	Steady
Maryland	Pending legislative action	After a failed attempt to redistrict prior to the 2026 elections, Democrats placed a redistricting referendum on the ballot, which was passed in the 2026 elections. The goal of a new map is to draw out the sole Republican congressional district in Maryland.	TBA		
Missouri	Districts left in place	The Missouri Legislature passed maps to create a new safely Republican seat in the 5th district. Governor Mike Kehoe signed the map into law in September 2025. The maps may be blocked by a referendum if enough signatures are gathered. On September 25, the U.S. Supreme Court held that state law rules in the case and granted an emergency stay of the Eighth Circuit's order and Judge Clark's injunction, leaving the 2022 maps in place for the 2026 elections. The referendum that would have allowed the new congressional maps failed in the 2026 elections.	Steady	Steady	Steady
New York	Pending legislative action	After multiple Republican states redrew their congressional lines prior to 2026, New York announced a plan to amend its constitution to redraw its congressional map mid-decade. It would occur through a vote in the legislature once before the 2026 elections and once after where voters will be allowed to vote on new lines in a referendum occurring in 2027.	TBA		
Net change			Steady	Steady	Steady

== Alabama ==
District		Incumbent				Candidates
Location	2026 PVI	Member	Party	First elected	Status	Candidates
Alabama 1	R+17	Jerry Carl	Republican	2020; 2024 (lost renomination); 2026	Incumbent's intent unknown	TBD
Alabama 2	R+7	Shomari Figures	Democratic	2024	Incumbent's intent unknown	TBD
Alabama 3	R+23	Mike Rogers	Republican	2002	Incumbent's intent unknown	TBD
Alabama 4	R+33	Robert Aderholt	Republican	1996	Incumbent's intent unknown	TBD
Alabama 5	R+15	Dale Strong	Republican	2022	Incumbent's intent unknown	TBD
Alabama 6	R+17	Gary Palmer	Republican	2014	Incumbent's intent unknown	TBD
Alabama 7	D+10	Terri Sewell	Democratic	2010	Incumbent's intent unknown	TBD

== Alaska ==
District		Incumbent				Candidates
Location	2026 PVI	Member	Party	First elected	Status	Candidates
Alaska at-large	R+6	Nick Begich III	Republican	2024	Incumbent's intent unknown	TBD

== Arizona ==
District		Incumbent				Candidates
Location	2026 PVI	Member	Party	First elected	Status	Candidates
Arizona 1	R+1	Amish Shah	Democratic	2026	Incumbent's intent unknown	TBD
Arizona 2	R+7	Eli Crane	Republican	2022	Incumbent's intent unknown	TBD
Arizona 3	D+22	Yassamin Ansari	Democratic	2024	Incumbent's intent unknown	TBD
Arizona 4	D+4	Greg Stanton	Democratic	2018	Incumbent's intent unknown	TBD
Arizona 5	R+10	Mark Lamb	Republican	2026	Incumbent's intent unknown	TBD
Arizona 6	EVEN	JoAnna Mendoza	Democratic	2026	Incumbent's intent unknown	TBD
Arizona 7	D+13	Adelita Grijalva	Democratic	2025 (special)	Incumbent's intent unknown	TBD
Arizona 8	R+8	Abe Hamadeh	Republican	2024	Incumbent's intent unknown	TBD
Arizona 9	R+15	Paul Gosar	Republican	2010	Incumbent's intent unknown	TBD

== Arkansas ==
District		Incumbent				Candidates
Location	2026 PVI	Member	Party	First elected	Status	Candidates
Arkansas 1	R+23	Rick Crawford	Republican	2010	Incumbent's intent unknown	TBD
Arkansas 2	R+8	French Hill	Republican	2014	Incumbent's intent unknown	TBD
Arkansas 3	R+13	Steve Womack	Republican	2010	Incumbent's intent unknown	TBD
Arkansas 4	R+20	Bruce Westerman	Republican	2014	Incumbent's intent unknown	TBD

== California ==
District		Incumbent				Candidates
Location	2026 PVI	Member	Party	First elected	Status	Candidates
California 1	D+7	Mike McGuire	Democratic	2026	Incumbent's intent unknown	TBD
California 2	D+13	Jared Huffman	Democratic	2012	Incumbent's intent unknown	TBD
California 3	D+6	Ami Bera	Democratic	2012	Incumbent's intent unknown	TBD
California 4	D+8	Eric Jones	Democratic	2026	Incumbent’s intent unknown	TBD
California 5	R+10	Tom McClintock	Republican	2008	Incumbent's intent unknown	TBD
California 6	D+5	Richard Pan	Democratic	2026	Incumbent's intent unknown	TBD
California 7	D+7	Doris Matsui	Democratic	2005 (special)	Incumbent's intent unknown	TBD
California 8	D+19	John Garamendi	Democratic	2009 (special)	Incumbent's intent unknown	TBD
California 9	D+8	Josh Harder	Democratic	2018	Incumbent's intent unknown	TBD
California 10	D+18	Mark DeSaulnier	Democratic	2014	Incumbent's intent unknown	TBD
California 11	D+36	Scott Wiener	Democratic	2026	Incumbent's intent unknown	TBD
California 12	D+39	Lateefah Simon	Democratic	2024	Incumbent's intent unknown	TBD
California 13	D+2	Adam Gray	Democratic	2024	Incumbent's intent unknown	TBD
California 14	D+19	Aisha Wahab	Democratic	2026 (special)	Incumbent's intent unknown	TBD
California 15	D+26	Kevin Mullin	Democratic	2022	Incumbent's intent unknown	TBD
California 16	D+25	Sam Liccardo	Democratic	2024	Incumbent's intent unknown	TBD
California 17	D+21	Ro Khanna	Democratic	2016	Incumbent's intent unknown	TBD
California 18	D+16	Zoe Lofgren	Democratic	1994	Incumbent's intent unknown	TBD
California 19	D+18	Jimmy Panetta	Democratic	2016	Incumbent's intent unknown	TBD
California 20	R+16	Vince Fong	Republican	2024 (special)	Incumbent's intent unknown	TBD
California 21	D+5	Jim Costa	Democratic	2004	Incumbent's intent unknown	TBD
California 22	D+1	Randy Villegas	Democratic	2026	Incumbent's intent unknown	TBD
California 23	R+9	Jay Obernolte	Republican	2020	Incumbent’s intent unknown	▌Tessa Lynn Hodge (Democratic)
California 24	D+13	Salud Carbajal	Democratic	2016	Incumbent's intent unknown	TBD
California 25	D+4	Raul Ruiz	Democratic	2012	Incumbent's intent unknown	TBD
California 26	D+9	Jacqui Irwin	Democratic	2026	Incumbent's intent unknown	TBD
California 27	D+6	George T. Whitesides	Democratic	2024	Incumbent's intent unknown	TBD
California 28	D+14	Judy Chu	Democratic	2009 (special)	Incumbent's intent unknown	TBD
California 29	D+19	Luz Rivas	Democratic	2024	Incumbent's intent unknown	TBD
California 30	D+21	Laura Friedman	Democratic	2024	Incumbent's intent unknown	TBD
California 31	D+8	Gil Cisneros	Democratic	2018; 2020 (lost); 2024	Incumbent's intent unknown	TBD
California 32	D+14	Brad Sherman	Democratic	1996	Incumbent's intent unknown	TBD
California 33	D+7	Pete Aguilar	Democratic	2014	Incumbent's intent unknown	TBD
California 34	D+28	Angela Gonzales-Torres	Democratic	2026	Incumbent's intent unknown	TBD
California 35	D+6	Norma Torres	Democratic	2014	Incumbent's intent unknown	TBD
California 36	D+21	Ted Lieu	Democratic	2014	Incumbent's intent unknown	TBD
California 37	D+33	Sydney Kamlager-Dove	Democratic	2022	Incumbent's intent unknown	TBD
California 38	D+8	Hilda Solis	Democratic	2000; 2009 (resigned); 2026	Incumbent's intent unknown	TBD
California 39	D+7	Mark Takano	Democratic	2012	Incumbent's intent unknown	TBD
California 40	R+6	Ken Calvert	Republican	1992	Incumbent's intent unknown	TBD
California 41	D+9	Linda Sánchez	Democratic	2002	Incumbent's intent unknown	TBD
California 42	D+8	Robert Garcia	Democratic	2022	Incumbent's intent unknown	TBD
California 43	D+27	Maxine Waters	Democratic	1990	Incumbent's intent unknown	TBD
California 44	D+20	Nanette Barragán	Democratic	2016	Incumbent's intent unknown	TBD
California 45	D+3	Derek Tran	Democratic	2024	Incumbent's intent unknown	TBD
California 46	D+10	Lou Correa	Democratic	2016	Incumbent's intent unknown	TBD
California 47	D+6	Dave Min	Democratic	2024	Incumbent's intent unknown	TBD
California 48	D+2	Marni von Wilpert	Democratic	2026	Incumbent's intent unknown	TBD
California 49	D+7	Mike Levin	Democratic	2018	Incumbent's intent unknown	TBD
California 50	D+10	Scott Peters	Democratic	2012	Incumbent's intent unknown	TBD
California 51	D+10	Sara Jacobs	Democratic	2020	Incumbent's intent unknown	TBD
California 52	D+11	Juan Vargas	Democratic	2012	Incumbent's intent unknown	TBD

== Colorado ==
District		Incumbent				Candidates
Location	2026 PVI	Member	Party	First elected	Status	Candidates
Colorado 1	D+29	Melat Kiros	Democratic	2026	Incumbent's intent unknown	TBD
Colorado 2	D+20	Joe Neguse	Democratic	2018	Incumbent's intent unknown	TBD
Colorado 3	R+5	Jeff Hurd	Republican	2024	Incumbent's intent unknown	TBD
Colorado 4	R+9	Eileen Laubacher	Democratic	2026	Incumbent's intent unknown	▌Gabe Evans (Republican)
Colorado 5	R+5	Jessica Killin	Democratic	2026	Incumbent's intent unknown	TBD
Colorado 6	D+11	Jason Crow	Democratic	2018	Incumbent's intent unknown	TBD
Colorado 7	D+8	Brittany Pettersen	Democratic	2022	Incumbent's intent unknown	TBD
Colorado 8	EVEN	Manny Rutinel	Democratic	2026	Incumbent's intent unknown	TBD

== Connecticut ==
District		Incumbent				Candidates
Location	2026 PVI	Member	Party	First elected	Status	Candidates
Connecticut 1	D+12	Luke Bronin	Democratic	2026	Incumbent's intent unknown	TBD
Connecticut 2	D+4	Joe Courtney	Democratic	2006	Incumbent's intent unknown	TBD
Connecticut 3	D+8	Rosa DeLauro	Democratic	1990	Incumbent's intent unknown	TBD
Connecticut 4	D+13	Jim Himes	Democratic	2008	Incumbent's intent unknown	TBD
Connecticut 5	D+3	Jahana Hayes	Democratic	2018	Incumbent's intent unknown	TBD

== Delaware ==
District		Incumbent				Candidates
Location	2026 PVI	Member	Party	First elected	Status	Candidates
Delaware at-large	D+8	Sarah McBride	Democratic	2024	Incumbent's intent unknown	TBD

== Florida ==
District		Incumbent				Candidates
Location	2026 PVI	Member	Party	First elected	Status	Candidates
Florida 1	R+18	Jimmy Patronis	Republican	2025 (special)	Incumbent's intent unknown	TBD
Florida 2	R+8	Austin Rogers	Republican	2026	Incumbent's intent unknown	TBD
Florida 3	R+10	Kat Cammack	Republican	2020	Incumbent's intent unknown	TBD
Florida 4	R+5	Aaron Bean	Republican	2022	Incumbent's intent unknown	TBD
Florida 5	R+10	John Rutherford	Republican	2016	Incumbent's intent unknown	TBD
Florida 6	R+14	Randy Fine	Republican	2025 (special)	Incumbent's intent unknown	TBD
Florida 7	R+5	Ryan Elijah	Republican	2026	Incumbent's intent unknown	TBD
Florida 8	R+8	Mike Haridopolos	Republican	2024	Incumbent's intent unknown	TBD
Florida 9	R+8	Darren Soto	Democratic	2016	Incumbent's intent unknown	TBD
Florida 10	D+13	Maxwell Frost	Democratic	2022	Incumbent's intent unknown	TBD
Florida 11	R+7	Joe Strada	Republican	2026	Incumbent's intent unknown	TBD
Florida 12	R+7	Gus Bilirakis	Republican	2006	Incumbent's intent unknown	TBD
Florida 13	R+6	Anna Paulina Luna	Republican	2022	Incumbent's intent unknown	TBD
Florida 14	R+4	Kathy Castor	Democratic	2006	Incumbent's intent unknown	TBD
Florida 15	R+9	Laurel Lee	Republican	2022	Incumbent's intent unknown	TBD
Florida 16	R+6	Sydney Gruters	Republican	2026	Incumbent's intent unknown	TBD
Florida 17	R+10	Greg Steube	Republican	2018	Incumbent's intent unknown	TBD
Florida 18	R+8	Scott Franklin	Republican	2020	Incumbent's intent unknown	TBD
Florida 19	R+14	Jim Schwartzel	Republican	2026	Incumbent's intent unknown	TBD
Florida 20	D+20	Debbie Wasserman Schultz	Democratic	2004	Incumbent's intent unknown	TBD
Florida 21	R+7	Brian Mast	Republican	2016	Incumbent's intent unknown	TBD
Florida 22	R+4	Pia Dandiya	Democratic	2026	Incumbent's intent unknown	TBD
Florida 23	D+9	Lois Frankel	Democratic	2012	Incumbent's intent unknown	TBD
Florida 24	D+22	Oliver Gilbert	Democratic	2026	Incumbent's intent unknown	TBD
Florida 25	R+3	Jared Moskowitz	Democratic	2022	Incumbent's intent unknown	TBD
Florida 26	R+7	Mario Díaz-Balart	Republican	2002	Incumbent's intent unknown	TBD
Florida 27	R+6	María Elvira Salazar	Republican	2020	Incumbent's intent unknown	TBD
Florida 28	R+10	Carlos A. Giménez	Republican	2020	Incumbent's intent unknown	TBD

== Georgia ==
District		Incumbent				Candidates
Location	2026 PVI	Member	Party	First elected	Status	Candidates
Georgia 1	R+8	Jim Kingston	Republican	2026	Incumbent's intent unknown	TBD
Georgia 2	D+4	Sanford Bishop	Democratic	1992	Incumbent's intent unknown	TBD
Georgia 3	R+15	Brian Jack	Republican	2024	Incumbent's intent unknown	TBD
Georgia 4	D+27	Hank Johnson	Democratic	2006	Incumbent's intent unknown	TBD
Georgia 5	D+36	Nikema Williams	Democratic	2020	Incumbent's intent unknown	TBD
Georgia 6	D+25	Lucy McBath	Democratic	2018	Incumbent's intent unknown	TBD
Georgia 7	R+11	Rich McCormick	Republican	2022	Incumbent's intent unknown	TBD
Georgia 8	R+15	Austin Scott	Republican	2010	Incumbent's intent unknown	TBD
Georgia 9	R+17	Andrew Clyde	Republican	2020	Incumbent's intent unknown	TBD
Georgia 10	R+11	Houston Gaines	Republican	2026	Incumbent's intent unknown	TBD
Georgia 11	R+12	John Cowan	Republican	2026	Incumbent's intent unknown	TBD
Georgia 12	R+7	Rick Allen	Republican	2014	Incumbent's intent unknown	TBD
Georgia 13	D+21	Jasmine Clark	Democratic	2026	Incumbent's intent unknown	TBD
Georgia 14	R+19	Clay Fuller	Republican	2026 (special)	Incumbent's intent unknown	TBD

== Hawaii ==
District		Incumbent				Candidates
Location	2026 PVI	Member	Party	First elected	Status	Candidates
Hawaii 1	D+13	Ed Case	Democratic	2002 (special); 2006 (retired); 2018	Incumbent's intent unknown	TBD
Hawaii 2	D+12	Jill Tokuda	Democratic	2022	Incumbent's intent unknown	TBD

== Idaho ==
District		Incumbent				Candidates
Location	2026 PVI	Member	Party	First elected	Status	Candidates
Idaho 1	R+22	Russ Fulcher	Republican	2018	Incumbent's intent unknown	TBD
Idaho 2	R+13	Mike Simpson	Republican	1998	Incumbent's intent unknown	TBD

== Illinois ==
District		Incumbent				Candidates
Location	2026 PVI	Member	Party	First elected	Status	Candidates
Illinois 1	D+18	Jonathan Jackson	Democratic	2022	Incumbent's intent unknown	TBD
Illinois 2	D+18	Donna Miller	Democratic	2026	Incumbent's intent unknown	TBD
Illinois 3	D+17	Delia Ramirez	Democratic	2022	Incumbent's intent unknown	TBD
Illinois 4	D+17	Patty García	Democratic	2026	Incumbent's intent unknown	TBD
Illinois 5	D+19	Mike Quigley	Democratic	2009 (special)	Incumbent's intent unknown	TBD
Illinois 6	D+3	Sean Casten	Democratic	2018	Incumbent's intent unknown	TBD
Illinois 7	D+34	La Shawn Ford	Democratic	2026	Incumbent's intent unknown	TBD
Illinois 8	D+5	Melissa Bean	Democratic	2004; 2010 (lost); 2026	Incumbent's intent unknown	TBD
Illinois 9	D+19	Daniel Biss	Democratic	2026	Incumbent's intent unknown	TBD
Illinois 10	D+12	Brad Schneider	Democratic	2012; 2014 (lost); 2016	Incumbent's intent unknown	TBD
Illinois 11	D+6	Bill Foster	Democratic	2008 (special); 2010 (lost); 2012	Incumbent's intent unknown	TBD
Illinois 12	R+22	Mike Bost	Republican	2014	Incumbent's intent unknown	TBD
Illinois 13	D+5	Nikki Budzinski	Democratic	2022	Incumbent's intent unknown	TBD
Illinois 14	D+3	Lauren Underwood	Democratic	2018	Incumbent's intent unknown	TBD
Illinois 15	R+20	Mary Miller	Republican	2020	Incumbent's intent unknown	TBD
Illinois 16	R+11	Darin LaHood	Republican	2015 (special)	Incumbent's intent unknown	TBD
Illinois 17	D+3	Eric Sorensen	Democratic	2022	Incumbent's intent unknown	TBD

== Indiana ==
District		Incumbent				Candidates
Location	2026 PVI	Member	Party	First elected	Status	Candidates
Indiana 1	D+1	Frank J. Mrvan	Democratic	2020	Incumbent's intent unknown	TBD
Indiana 2	R+13	Rudy Yakym	Republican	2022 (special)	Incumbent's intent unknown	TBD
Indiana 3	R+16	Marlin Stutzman	Republican	2010 (special); 2016 (retired); 2024	Incumbent's intent unknown	TBD
Indiana 4	R+15	Jim Baird	Republican	2018	Incumbent's intent unknown	TBD
Indiana 5	R+8	J. D. Ford	Democratic	2026	Incumbent's intent unknown	TBD
Indiana 6	R+16	Jefferson Shreve	Republican	2024	Incumbent's intent unknown	TBD
Indiana 7	D+21	André Carson	Democratic	2008 (special)	Incumbent's intent unknown	TBD
Indiana 8	R+18	Mark Messmer	Republican	2024	Incumbent's intent unknown	TBD
Indiana 9	R+15	Erin Houchin	Republican	2022	Incumbent's intent unknown	TBD

== Iowa ==
District		Incumbent				Candidates
Location	2026 PVI	Member	Party	First elected	Status	Candidates
Iowa 1	R+4	Christina Bohannan	Democratic	2026	Incumbent's intent unknown	TBD
Iowa 2	R+4	Lindsay James	Democratic	2026	Incumbent's intent unknown	TBD
Iowa 3	R+2	Sarah Trone Garriott	Democratic	2026	Incumbent's intent unknown	TBD
Iowa 4	R+15	Chris McGowan	Republican	2026	Incumbent's intent unknown	TBD

== Kansas ==
District		Incumbent				Candidates
Location	2026 PVI	Member	Party	First elected	Status	Candidates
Kansas 1	R+16	Tracey Mann	Republican	2020	Incumbent's intent unknown	TBD
Kansas 2	R+10	Derek Schmidt	Republican	2024	Incumbent's intent unknown	TBD
Kansas 3	D+2	Sharice Davids	Democratic	2018	Incumbent's intent unknown	TBD
Kansas 4	R+12	Ron Estes	Republican	2017 (special)	Incumbent's intent unknown	TBD

== Kentucky ==
District		Incumbent				Candidates
Location	2026 PVI	Member	Party	First elected	Status	Candidates
Kentucky 1	R+23	James Comer	Republican	2016 (special)	Incumbent's intent unknown	TBD
Kentucky 2	R+20	Brett Guthrie	Republican	2008	Incumbent's intent unknown	TBD
Kentucky 3	D+10	Morgan McGarvey	Democratic	2022	Incumbent's intent unknown	TBD
Kentucky 4	R+18	Ed Gallrein	Republican	2026	Incumbent's intent unknown	TBD
Kentucky 5	R+32	Hal Rogers	Republican	1980	Incumbent's intent unknown	TBD
Kentucky 6	R+7	Zach Dembo	Democratic	2026	Incumbent's intent unknown	TBD

== Louisiana ==
District		Incumbent				Candidates
Location	2026 PVI	Member	Party	First elected	Status	Candidates
Louisiana 1	R+23	Steve Scalise	Republican	2008 (special)	Incumbent's intent unknown	TBD
Louisiana 2	D+25	Troy Carter	Democratic	2021 (special)	Incumbent's intent unknown	TBD
Louisiana 3	R+18	Clay Higgins	Republican	2016	Incumbent's intent unknown	TBD
Louisiana 4	R+17	Mike Johnson	Republican	2016	Incumbent's intent unknown	TBD
Louisiana 5	R+17	TBD				
Louisiana 6	R+16	TBD				

== Maine ==
District		Incumbent				Candidates
Location	2026 PVI	Member	Party	First elected	Status	Candidates
Maine 1	D+11	Chellie Pingree	Democratic	2008	Incumbent's intent unknown	TBD
Maine 2	R+4	Paul LePage	Republican	2026	Incumbent's intent unknown	TBD

== Maryland ==
District		Incumbent				Candidates
Location	2026 PVI	Member	Party	First elected	Status	Candidates
Maryland 1	R+8	Andy Harris	Republican	2010	Incumbent's intent unknown	TBD
Maryland 2	D+10	Johnny Olszewski	Democratic	2024	Incumbent's intent unknown	TBD
Maryland 3	D+12	Sarah Elfreth	Democratic	2024	Incumbent's intent unknown	TBD
Maryland 4	D+39	Glenn Ivey	Democratic	2022	Incumbent's intent unknown	TBD
Maryland 5	D+17	Adrian Boafo	Democratic	2026	Incumbent's intent unknown	TBD
Maryland 6	D+3	April McClain Delaney	Democratic	2024	Incumbent's intent unknown	TBD
Maryland 7	D+12	Kweisi Mfume	Democratic	1986; 1996 (resigned); 2020 (special)	Incumbent's intent unknown	TBD
Maryland 8	D+30	Jamie Raskin	Democratic	2016	Incumbent's intent unknown	TBD

== Massachusetts ==
District		Incumbent				Candidates
Location	2026 PVI	Member	Party	First elected	Status	Candidates
Massachusetts 1	D+8	Richard Neal	Democratic	1988	Incumbent's intent unknown	TBD
Massachusetts 2	D+13	Jim McGovern	Democratic	1996	Incumbent's intent unknown	TBD
Massachusetts 3	D+11	Lori Trahan	Democratic	2018	Incumbent's intent unknown	TBD
Massachusetts 4	D+11	Jake Auchincloss	Democratic	2020	Incumbent's intent unknown	TBD
Massachusetts 5	D+24	Katherine Clark	Democratic	2013 (special)	Incumbent's intent unknown	TBD
Massachusetts 6	D+11	Dan Koh	Democratic	2026	Incumbent's intent unknown	TBD
Massachusetts 7	D+34	Ayanna Pressley	Democratic	2018	Incumbent's intent unknown	TBD
Massachusetts 8	D+15	Stephen Lynch	Democratic	2001 (special)	Incumbent's intent unknown	TBD
Massachusetts 9	D+6	Bill Keating	Democratic	2010	Incumbent's intent unknown	TBD

== Michigan ==
District		Incumbent				Candidates
Location	2026 PVI	Member	Party	First elected	Status	Candidates
Michigan 1	R+11	Jack Bergman	Republican	2016	Incumbent's intent unknown	TBD
Michigan 2	R+15	John Moolenaar	Republican	2014	Incumbent's intent unknown	TBD
Michigan 3	D+4	Hillary Scholten	Democratic	2022	Incumbent's intent unknown	TBD
Michigan 4	R+3	Sean McCann	Democratic	2026	Incumbent's intent unknown	TBD
Michigan 5	R+13	Tim Walberg	Republican	2006; 2008 (lost); 2010	Incumbent's intent unknown	TBD
Michigan 6	D+12	Debbie Dingell	Democratic	2014	Incumbent's intent unknown	TBD
Michigan 7	EVEN	William Lawrence	Democratic	2026	Incumbent's intent unknown	TBD
Michigan 8	R+1	Kristen McDonald Rivet	Democratic	2024	Incumbent's intent unknown	TBD
Michigan 9	R+16	Lisa McClain	Republican	2020	Incumbent's intent unknown	TBD
Michigan 10	R+3	Christina Hines	Democratic	2026	Incumbent's intent unknown	TBD
Michigan 11	D+9	Jeremy Moss	Democratic	2026	Incumbent's intent unknown	TBD
Michigan 12	D+21	Rashida Tlaib	Democratic	2018	Incumbent's intent unknown	TBD
Michigan 13	D+22	Donavan McKinney	Democratic	2026	Incumbent's intent unknown	TBD

== Minnesota ==
District		Incumbent				Candidates
Location	2026 PVI	Member	Party	First elected	Status	Candidates
Minnesota 1	R+6	TBD				
Minnesota 2	D+3	Matt Little	DFL	2026	Incumbent's intent unknown	TBD
Minnesota 3	D+11	Kelly Morrison	DFL	2024	Incumbent's intent unknown	TBD
Minnesota 4	D+18	Betty McCollum	DFL	2000	Incumbent's intent unknown	TBD
Minnesota 5	D+32	Ilhan Omar	DFL	2018	Incumbent's intent unknown	TBD
Minnesota 6	R+10	Tom Emmer	Republican	2014	Incumbent's intent unknown	TBD
Minnesota 7	R+18	Michelle Fischbach	Republican	2020	Incumbent's intent unknown	TBD
Minnesota 8	R+7	Pete Stauber	Republican	2018	Incumbent's intent unknown	TBD

== Mississippi ==
District		Incumbent				Candidates
Location	2026 PVI	Member	Party	First elected	Status	Candidates
Mississippi 1	R+18	Trent Kelly	Republican	2015 (special)	Incumbent's intent unknown	TBD
Mississippi 2	D+11	Bennie Thompson	Democratic	1993 (special)	Incumbent's intent unknown	TBD
Mississippi 3	R+14	Michael Guest	Republican	2018	Incumbent's intent unknown	TBD
Mississippi 4	R+21	Mike Ezell	Republican	2022	Incumbent's intent unknown	TBD

== Missouri ==
District		Incumbent				Candidates
Location	2026 PVI	Member	Party	First elected	Status	Candidates
Missouri 1	D+29	Wesley Bell	Democratic	2024	Incumbent's intent unknown	TBD
Missouri 2	R+4	Fred Wellman	Democratic	2026	Incumbent's intent unknown	TBD
Missouri 3	R+13	Bob Onder	Republican	2024	Incumbent's intent unknown	TBD
Missouri 4	R+21	Mark Alford	Republican	2022	Incumbent's intent unknown	TBD
Missouri 5	D+12	Emanuel Cleaver	Democratic	2004	Incumbent's intent unknown	TBD
Missouri 6	R+19	Chris Stigall	Republican	2026	Incumbent's intent unknown	TBD
Missouri 7	R+21	Eric Burlison	Republican	2022	Incumbent's intent unknown	TBD
Missouri 8	R+27	Jason Smith	Republican	2013 (special)	Incumbent's intent unknown	TBD

== Montana ==
District		Incumbent				Candidates
Location	2026 PVI	Member	Party	First elected	Status	Candidates
Montana 1	R+5	Sam Forstag	Democratic	2026	Incumbent's intent unknown	TBD
Montana 2	R+15	Troy Downing	Republican	2024	Incumbent's intent unknown	TBD

== Nebraska ==
District		Incumbent				Candidates
Location	2026 PVI	Member	Party	First elected	Status	Candidates
Nebraska 1	R+6	Mike Flood	Republican	2022 (special)	Incumbent's intent unknown	TBD
Nebraska 2	D+3	Denise Powell	Democratic	2026	Incumbent's intent unknown	TBD
Nebraska 3	R+27	Adrian Smith	Republican	2006	Incumbent's intent unknown	TBD

== Nevada ==
District		Incumbent				Candidates
Location	2026 PVI	Member	Party	First elected	Status	Candidates
Nevada 1	D+2	Dina Titus	Democratic	2008; 2010 (lost); 2012	Incumbent's intent unknown	TBD
Nevada 2	R+7	Teresa Benitez-Thompson	Democratic	2026	Incumbent's intent unknown	TBD
Nevada 3	D+1	Susie Lee	Democratic	2018	Incumbent's intent unknown	TBD
Nevada 4	D+2	Steven Horsford	Democratic	2012; 2014 (lost); 2018	Incumbent's intent unknown	TBD

== New Hampshire ==
District		Incumbent				Candidates
Location	2026 PVI	Member	Party	First elected	Status	Candidates
New Hampshire 1	D+2	Stefany Shaheen	Democratic	2026	Incumbent's intent unknown	TBD
New Hampshire 2	D+2	Maggie Goodlander	Democratic	2024	Incumbent's intent unknown	TBD

== New Jersey ==
District		Incumbent				Candidates
Location	2026 PVI	Member	Party	First elected	Status	Candidates
New Jersey 1	D+10	Donald Norcross	Democratic	2014 (special)	Incumbent's intent unknown	TBD
New Jersey 2	R+5	Zack Mullock	Democratic	2026	Incumbent's intent unknown	TBD
New Jersey 3	D+5	Herb Conaway	Democratic	2024	Incumbent's intent unknown	TBD
New Jersey 4	R+14	Chris Smith	Republican	1980	Incumbent's intent unknown	TBD
New Jersey 5	D+2	Josh Gottheimer	Democratic	2016	Incumbent's intent unknown	TBD
New Jersey 6	D+5	Frank Pallone	Democratic	1988 (special)	Incumbent's intent unknown	TBD
New Jersey 7	EVEN	Rebecca Bennett	Democratic	2026	Incumbent's intent unknown	TBD
New Jersey 8	D+15	Rob Menendez	Democratic	2022	Incumbent's intent unknown	TBD
New Jersey 9	D+2	Nellie Pou	Democratic	2024	Incumbent's intent unknown	TBD
New Jersey 10	D+27	LaMonica McIver	Democratic	2024 (special)	Incumbent's intent unknown	TBD
New Jersey 11	D+5	Analilia Mejia	Democratic	2026 (special)	Incumbent's intent unknown	TBD
New Jersey 12	D+13	Adam Hamawy	Democratic	2026	Incumbent's intent unknown	TBD

== New Mexico ==
District		Incumbent				Candidates
Location	2026 PVI	Member	Party	First elected	Status	Candidates
New Mexico 1	D+7	Melanie Stansbury	Democratic	2021 (special)	Incumbent's intent unknown	TBD
New Mexico 2	EVEN	Gabe Vasquez	Democratic	2022	Incumbent's intent unknown	TBD
New Mexico 3	D+3	Teresa Leger Fernández	Democratic	2020	Incumbent's intent unknown	TBD

== New York ==
District		Incumbent				Candidates
Location	2026 PVI	Member	Party	First elected	Status	Candidates
New York 1	R+4	Nick LaLota	Republican	2022	Incumbent's intent unknown	TBD
New York 2	R+6	Andrew Garbarino	Republican	2020	Incumbent's intent unknown	TBD
New York 3	EVEN	Tom Suozzi	Democratic	2016; 2022 (retired); 2024 (special)	Incumbent's intent unknown	TBD
New York 4	D+2	Laura Gillen	Democratic	2024	Incumbent's intent unknown	TBD
New York 5	D+24	Gregory Meeks	Democratic	1998 (special)	Incumbent's intent unknown	TBD
New York 6	D+6	Grace Meng	Democratic	2012	Incumbent's intent unknown	TBD
New York 7	D+25	Claire Valdez	Democratic	2026	Incumbent's intent unknown	TBD
New York 8	D+24	Hakeem Jeffries	Democratic	2012	Incumbent's intent unknown	TBD
New York 9	D+22	Yvette Clarke	Democratic	2006	Incumbent's intent unknown	TBD
New York 10	D+32	Brad Lander	Democratic	2026	Incumbent's intent unknown	TBD
New York 11	R+10	Nicole Malliotakis	Republican	2020	Incumbent's intent unknown	TBD
New York 12	D+33	Micah Lasher	Democratic	2026	Incumbent's intent unknown	TBD
New York 13	D+32	Darializa Avila Chevalier	Democratic	2026	Incumbent's intent unknown	TBD
New York 14	D+19	Alexandria Ocasio-Cortez	Democratic	2018	Incumbent's intent unknown	TBD
New York 15	D+27	Ritchie Torres	Democratic	2020	Incumbent's intent unknown	TBD
New York 16	D+18	George Latimer	Democratic	2024	Incumbent's intent unknown	TBD
New York 17	D+1	Cait Conley	Democratic	2026	Incumbent's intent unknown	TBD
New York 18	D+2	Pat Ryan	Democratic	2022 (special)	Incumbent's intent unknown	TBD
New York 19	D+1	Josh Riley	Democratic	2024	Incumbent's intent unknown	TBD
New York 20	D+8	Paul Tonko	Democratic	2008	Incumbent's intent unknown	TBD
New York 21	R+10	Anthony Constantino	Republican	2026	Incumbent's intent unknown	TBD
New York 22	D+4	John Mannion	Democratic	2024	Incumbent's intent unknown	TBD
New York 23	R+10	Nick Langworthy	Republican	2022	Incumbent's intent unknown	TBD
New York 24	R+11	Claudia Tenney	Republican	2016; 2018 (lost); 2020	Incumbent's intent unknown	TBD
New York 25	D+10	Joseph Morelle	Democratic	2018 (special)	Incumbent's intent unknown	TBD
New York 26	D+11	Tim Kennedy	Democratic	2024 (special)	Incumbent's intent unknown	TBD

== North Carolina ==
District		Incumbent				Candidates
Location	2026 PVI	Member	Party	First elected	Status	Candidates
North Carolina 1	R+5	Don Davis	Democratic	2022	Incumbent's intent unknown	TBD
North Carolina 2	D+17	Deborah Ross	Democratic	2020	Incumbent's intent unknown	TBD
North Carolina 3	R+6	Raymond Smith	Democratic	2026	Incumbent’s intent unknown	TBD
North Carolina 4	D+23	Valerie Foushee	Democratic	2022	Incumbent's intent unknown	TBD
North Carolina 5	R+9	Chuck Hubbard	Democratic	2026	Incumbent's intent unknown	▌Virginia Foxx (Republican)
North Carolina 6	R+9	Cyril Jefferson	Democratic	2026	Incumbent's intent unknown	TBD
North Carolina 7	R+7	David Rouzer	Republican	2014	Incumbent's intent unknown	▌Kimberly Hardy (Democratic)
North Carolina 8	R+10	Mark Harris	Republican	2024	Incumbent's intent unknown	TBD
North Carolina 9	R+8	Richard Ojeda	Democratic	2026	Incumbent's intent unknown	TBD
North Carolina 10	R+9	Pat Harrigan	Republican	2024	Incumbent's intent unknown	TBD
North Carolina 11	R+5	Jamie Ager	Democratic	2026	Incumbent's intent unknown	▌Jennifer Balkcom (Republican)
North Carolina 12	D+24	Alma Adams	Democratic	2014 (special)	Incumbent's intent unknown	TBD
North Carolina 13	R+8	Paul Barringer	Democratic	2026	Incumbent's intent unknown	TBD
North Carolina 14	R+8	LaKesha Womack	Democratic	2026	Incumbent's intent unknown	▌Tim Moore (Republican)

== North Dakota ==
District		Incumbent				Candidates
Location	2026 PVI	Member	Party	First elected	Status	Candidates
North Dakota at-large	R+18	Julie Fedorchak	Republican	2024	Incumbent's intent unknown	TBD

== Ohio ==
District		Incumbent				Candidates (Note: In Ohio, congressional candidates file with the board of elections of the most populous county in their districts, not with the Secretary of State.)
Location	2026 PVI	Member	Party	First elected	Status	Candidates
Ohio 1	R+1	Greg Landsman	Democratic	2022	Incumbent's intent unknown	TBD
Ohio 2	R+21	David Taylor	Republican	2024	Incumbent's intent unknown	TBD
Ohio 3	D+21	Joyce Beatty	Democratic	2012	Incumbent's intent unknown	TBD
Ohio 4	R+21	Jim Jordan	Republican	2006	Incumbent's intent unknown	TBD
Ohio 5	R+12	Bob Latta	Republican	2007 (special)	Incumbent's intent unknown	TBD
Ohio 6	R+17	Michael Rulli	Republican	2024 (special)	Incumbent's intent unknown	TBD
Ohio 7	R+5	Brian Poindexter	Democratic	2026	Incumbent's intent unknown	TBD
Ohio 8	R+8	Warren Davidson	Republican	2016 (special)	Incumbent's intent unknown	TBD
Ohio 9	R+5	Marcy Kaptur	Democratic	1982	Incumbent's intent unknown	TBD
Ohio 10	R+4	Kristina Knickerbocker	Democratic	2026	Incumbent's intent unknown	TBD
Ohio 11	D+28	Shontel Brown	Democratic	2021 (special)	Incumbent's intent unknown	TBD
Ohio 12	R+15	Troy Balderson	Republican	2018 (special)	Incumbent's intent unknown	TBD
Ohio 13	D+2	Emilia Sykes	Democratic	2022	Incumbent's intent unknown	TBD
Ohio 14	R+10	David Joyce	Republican	2012	Incumbent's intent unknown	TBD
Ohio 15	R+5	Don Leonard	Democratic	2026	Incumbent's intent unknown	TBD

== Oklahoma ==
District		Incumbent				Candidates
Location	2026 PVI	Member	Party	First elected	Status	Candidates
Oklahoma 1	R+11	Mark Tedford	Republican	2026	Incumbent's intent unknown	TBD
Oklahoma 2	R+28	Josh Brecheen	Republican	2022	Incumbent's intent unknown	TBD
Oklahoma 3	R+23	Frank Lucas	Republican	1994 (special)	Incumbent's intent unknown	TBD
Oklahoma 4	R+17	Tom Cole	Republican	2002	Incumbent's intent unknown	TBD
Oklahoma 5	R+9	Stephanie Bice	Republican	2020	Incumbent's intent unknown	TBD

== Oregon ==
District		Incumbent				Candidates
Location	2026 PVI	Member	Party	First elected	Status	Candidates
Oregon 1	D+20	Suzanne Bonamici	Democratic	2012 (special)	Incumbent's intent unknown	TBD
Oregon 2	R+14	Cliff Bentz	Republican	2020	Incumbent's intent unknown	TBD
Oregon 3	D+24	Maxine Dexter	Democratic	2024	Incumbent's intent unknown	TBD
Oregon 4	D+6	Val Hoyle	Democratic	2022	Incumbent's intent unknown	TBD
Oregon 5	D+4	Janelle Bynum	Democratic	2024	Incumbent's intent unknown	TBD
Oregon 6	D+6	Andrea Salinas	Democratic	2022	Incumbent's intent unknown	TBD

== Pennsylvania ==
District		Incumbent				Candidates
Location	2026 PVI	Member	Party	First elected	Status	Candidates
Pennsylvania 1	D+1	Bob Harvie	Democratic	2026	Incumbent's intent unknown	TBD
Pennsylvania 2	D+19	Brendan Boyle	Democratic	2014	Incumbent's intent unknown	TBD
Pennsylvania 3	D+40	Chris Rabb	Democratic	2026	Incumbent's intent unknown	TBD
Pennsylvania 4	D+8	Madeleine Dean	Democratic	2018	Incumbent's intent unknown	TBD
Pennsylvania 5	D+15	Mary Gay Scanlon	Democratic	2018 (special)	Incumbent's intent unknown	TBD
Pennsylvania 6	D+6	Chrissy Houlahan	Democratic	2018	Incumbent's intent unknown	TBD
Pennsylvania 7	R+1	Bob Brooks	Democratic	2026	Incumbent's intent unknown	TBD
Pennsylvania 8	R+4	Paige Cognetti	Democratic	2026	Incumbent's intent unknown	TBD
Pennsylvania 9	R+19	Dan Meuser	Republican	2018	Incumbent's intent unknown	TBD
Pennsylvania 10	R+3	Janelle Stelson	Democratic	2026	Incumbent's intent unknown	TBD
Pennsylvania 11	R+11	Lloyd Smucker	Republican	2016	Incumbent's intent unknown	TBD
Pennsylvania 12	D+10	Summer Lee	Democratic	2022	Incumbent's intent unknown	TBD
Pennsylvania 13	R+23	John Joyce	Republican	2018	Incumbent's intent unknown	TBD
Pennsylvania 14	R+17	Guy Reschenthaler	Republican	2018	Incumbent's intent unknown	TBD
Pennsylvania 15	R+19	Glenn Thompson	Republican	2008	Incumbent's intent unknown	TBD
Pennsylvania 16	R+11	Mike Kelly	Republican	2010	Incumbent's intent unknown	TBD
Pennsylvania 17	D+3	Chris Deluzio	Democratic	2022	Incumbent's intent unknown	TBD

== Rhode Island ==
District		Incumbent				Candidates
Location	2026 PVI	Member	Party	First elected	Status	Candidates
Rhode Island 1	D+12	Gabe Amo	Democratic	2023 (special)	Incumbent's intent unknown	TBD
Rhode Island 2	D+4	Seth Magaziner	Democratic	2022	Incumbent's intent unknown	TBD

== South Carolina ==
District		Incumbent				Candidates
Location	2026 PVI	Member	Party	First elected	Status	Candidates
South Carolina 1	R+6	Nancy Lacore	Democratic	2026	Incumbent's intent unknown	TBD
South Carolina 2	R+7	Joe Wilson	Republican	2001 (special)	Incumbent's intent unknown	▌Zyon Khalifa (Democratic)
South Carolina 3	R+21	Sheri Biggs	Republican	2024	Incumbent's intent unknown	TBD
South Carolina 4	R+11	William Timmons	Republican	2018	Incumbent's intent unknown	TBD
South Carolina 5	R+11	Wes Climer	Republican	2026	Incumbent's intent unknown	TBD
South Carolina 6	D+13	Jim Clyburn	Democratic	1992	Incumbent's intent unknown	TBD
South Carolina 7	R+12	Russell Fry	Republican	2022	Incumbent's intent unknown	TBD

== South Dakota ==
District		Incumbent				Candidates
Location	2026 PVI	Member	Party	First elected	Status	Candidates
South Dakota at-large	R+15	Marty Jackley	Republican	2026	Incumbent's intent unknown	TBD

== Tennessee ==
District		Incumbent				Candidates
Location	2026 PVI	Member	Party	First elected	Status	Candidates
Tennessee 1	R+29	Diana Harshbarger	Republican	2020	Incumbent's intent unknown	TBD
Tennessee 2	R+17	Tim Burchett	Republican	2018	Incumbent retiring to run for Senate	TBD
Tennessee 3	R+18	Chuck Fleischmann	Republican	2010	Incumbent's intent unknown	TBD
Tennessee 4	R+11	Victoria Broderick	Democratic	2026	Incumbent's intent unknown	TBD
Tennessee 5	R+10	Charlie Hatcher	Republican	2026	Incumbent's intent unknown	TBD
Tennessee 6	R+13	Johnny Garrett	Republican	2026	Incumbent's intent unknown	TBD
Tennessee 7	R+11	Matt Van Epps	Republican	2025 (special)	Incumbent's intent unknown	TBD
Tennessee 8	R+10	David Kustoff	Republican	2016	Incumbent's intent unknown	TBD
Tennessee 9	R+9	Brent Taylor	Republican	2026	Incumbent's intent unknown	TBD

== Texas ==
District		Incumbent				Candidates
Location	2026 PVI	Member	Party	First elected	Status	Candidates
Texas 1	R+24	Nathaniel Moran	Republican	2022	Incumbent's intent unknown	TBD
Texas 2	R+11	Steve Toth	Republican	2026	Incumbent's intent unknown	TBD
Texas 3	R+11	Keith Self	Republican	2022	Incumbent's intent unknown	TBD
Texas 4	R+12	Pat Fallon	Republican	2020	Incumbent's intent unknown	TBD
Texas 5	R+10	Lance Gooden	Republican	2018	Incumbent's intent unknown	TBD
Texas 6	R+11	Jake Ellzey	Republican	2021 (special)	Incumbent's intent unknown	TBD
Texas 7	D+13	Lizzie Fletcher	Democratic	2018	Incumbent's intent unknown	TBD
Texas 8	R+13	Jessica Steinmann	Republican	2026	Incumbent's intent unknown	TBD
Texas 9	R+9	Leticia Gutierrez	Democratic	2026	Incumbent's intent unknown	TBD
Texas 10	R+10	Chris Gober	Republican	2026	Incumbent's intent unknown	TBD
Texas 11	R+17	August Pfluger	Republican	2020	Incumbent's intent unknown	TBD
Texas 12	R+11	Craig Goldman	Republican	2024	Incumbent's intent unknown	TBD
Texas 13	R+23	Ronny Jackson	Republican	2020	Incumbent's intent unknown	TBD
Texas 14	R+12	Randy Weber	Republican	2012	Incumbent's intent unknown	TBD
Texas 15	R+7	Bobby Pulido	Democratic	2026	Incumbent's intent unknown	TBD
Texas 16	D+11	Veronica Escobar	Democratic	2018	Incumbent's intent unknown	TBD
Texas 17	R+10	Pete Sessions	Republican	1996; 2018 (lost); 2020	Incumbent's intent unknown	TBD
Texas 18	D+29	Christian Menefee	Democratic	2026 (special)	Incumbent's intent unknown	TBD
Texas 19	R+25	Tom Sell	Republican	2026	Incumbent's intent unknown	TBD
Texas 20	D+16	Joaquin Castro	Democratic	2012	Incumbent's intent unknown	TBD
Texas 21	R+10	Mark Teixeira	Republican	2026	Incumbent's intent unknown	TBD
Texas 22	R+11	Trever Nehls	Republican	2026	Incumbent's intent unknown	TBD
Texas 23	R+7	Katy Padilla Stout	Democratic	2026	Incumbent's intent unknown	TBD
Texas 24	R+8	Beth Van Duyne	Republican	2020	Incumbent's intent unknown	TBD
Texas 25	R+11	Roger Williams	Republican	2012	Incumbent's intent unknown	TBD
Texas 26	R+11	Brandon Gill	Republican	2024	Incumbent's intent unknown	TBD
Texas 27	R+10	Michael Cloud	Republican	2018 (special)	Incumbent's intent unknown	TBD
Texas 28	R+3	Henry Cuellar	Democratic	2004	Incumbent's intent unknown	TBD
Texas 29	D+17	Sylvia Garcia	Democratic	2018	Incumbent's intent unknown	TBD
Texas 30	D+25	Frederick Haynes III	Democratic	2026	Incumbent's intent unknown	TBD
Texas 31	R+11	John Carter	Republican	2002	Incumbent's intent unknown	TBD
Texas 32	R+8	Jace Yarbrough	Republican	2026	Incumbent's intent unknown	TBD
Texas 33	D+18	Colin Allred	Democratic	2018; 2024 (retired); 2026	Incumbent's intent unknown	TBD
Texas 34	R+3	Vicente Gonzalez	Democratic	2016	Incumbent's intent unknown	TBD
Texas 35	R+4	Johnny Garcia	Democratic	2026	Incumbent's intent unknown	TBD
Texas 36	R+12	Brian Babin	Republican	2014	Incumbent's intent unknown	TBD
Texas 37	D+30	Greg Casar	Democratic	2022	Incumbent's intent unknown	TBD
Texas 38	R+10	Jon Bonck	Republican	2026	Incumbent's intent unknown	TBD

== Utah ==
District		Incumbent				Candidates
Location	2026 PVI	Member	Party	First elected	Status	Candidates
Utah 1	D+12	Ben McAdams	Democratic	2018; 2020 (lost); 2026	Incumbent's intent unknown	TBD
Utah 2	R+15	Blake Moore	Republican	2020	Incumbent's intent unknown	TBD
Utah 3	R+21	Celeste Maloy	Republican	2023 (special)	Incumbent's intent unknown	TBD
Utah 4	R+17	Mike Kennedy	Republican	2024	Incumbent's intent unknown	TBD

== Vermont ==
District		Incumbent				Candidates
Location	2026 PVI	Member	Party	First elected	Status	Candidates
Vermont at-large	D+17	Becca Balint	Democratic	2022	Incumbent's intent unknown	TBD

== Virginia ==
District		Incumbent				Candidates
Location	2026 PVI	Member	Party	First elected	Status	Candidates
Virginia 1	R+3	Shannon Taylor	Democratic	2026	Incumbent's intent unknown	TBD
Virginia 2	EVEN	Elaine Luria	Democratic	2018; 2022 (lost); 2026	Incumbent's intent unknown	TBD
Virginia 3	D+18	Bobby Scott	Democratic	1992	Incumbent's intent unknown	TBD
Virginia 4	D+17	Jennifer McClellan	Democratic	2023 (special)	Incumbent's intent unknown	TBD
Virginia 5	R+6	John McGuire	Republican	2024	Incumbent's intent unknown	TBD
Virginia 6	R+12	Ben Cline	Republican	2018	Incumbent's intent unknown	TBD
Virginia 7	D+2	Eugene Vindman	Democratic	2024	Incumbent's intent unknown	TBD
Virginia 8	D+26	Don Beyer	Democratic	2014	Incumbent's intent unknown	TBD
Virginia 9	R+22	Morgan Griffith	Republican	2010	Incumbent's intent unknown	TBD
Virginia 10	D+6	Suhas Subramanyam	Democratic	2024	Incumbent's intent unknown	TBD
Virginia 11	D+18	James Walkinshaw	Democratic	2025 (special)	Incumbent's intent unknown	TBD

== Washington ==
District		Incumbent				Candidates
Location	2026 PVI	Member	Party	First elected	Status	Candidates
Washington 1	D+15	Suzan DelBene	Democratic	2012 (special)	Incumbent's intent unknown	TBD
Washington 2	D+12	Rick Larsen	Democratic	2000	Incumbent's intent unknown	TBD
Washington 3	R+2	Marie Gluesenkamp Perez	Democratic	2022	Incumbent's intent unknown	TBD
Washington 4	R+10	Amanda McKinney	Republican	2026	Incumbent's intent unknown	TBD
Washington 5	R+5	Michael Baumgartner	Republican	2024	Incumbent's intent unknown	TBD
Washington 6	D+10	Emily Randall	Democratic	2024	Incumbent's intent unknown	TBD
Washington 7	D+39	Pramila Jayapal	Democratic	2016	Incumbent's intent unknown	TBD
Washington 8	D+3	Kim Schrier	Democratic	2018	Incumbent's intent unknown	TBD
Washington 9	D+22	Adam Smith	Democratic	1996	Incumbent's intent unknown	TBD
Washington 10	D+9	Marilyn Strickland	Democratic	2020	Incumbent's intent unknown	TBD

== West Virginia ==
District		Incumbent				Candidates
Location	2026 PVI	Member	Party	First elected	Status	Candidates
West Virginia 1	R+22	Carol Miller	Republican	2018	Incumbent's intent unknown	TBD
West Virginia 2	R+20	Riley Moore	Republican	2024	Incumbent's intent unknown	TBD

== Wisconsin ==
District		Incumbent				Candidates
Location	2026 PVI	Member	Party	First elected	Status	Candidates
Wisconsin 1	R+2	Mitchell Berman	Democratic	2026	Incumbent's intent unknown	TBD
Wisconsin 2	D+21	Mark Pocan	Democratic	2012	Incumbent's intent unknown	TBD
Wisconsin 3	R+3	Rebecca Cooke	Democratic	2026	Incumbent's intent unknown	TBD
Wisconsin 4	D+26	Gwen Moore	Democratic	2004	Incumbent's intent unknown	TBD
Wisconsin 5	R+11	Scott Fitzgerald	Republican	2020	Incumbent's intent unknown	TBD
Wisconsin 6	R+8	Glenn Grothman	Republican	2014	Incumbent's intent unknown	TBD
Wisconsin 7	R+11	Michael Alfonso	Republican	2026	Incumbent's intent unknown	TBD
Wisconsin 8	R+8	Tony Wied	Republican	2024 (special)	Incumbent's intent unknown	TBD

== Wyoming ==
District		Incumbent				Candidates
Location	2026 PVI	Member	Party	First elected	Status	Candidates
Wyoming at-large	R+23	Chuck Gray	Republican	2026	Incumbent's intent unknown	TBD

== Non-voting delegates ==
District	Incumbent				Candidates
District	Member	Party	First elected	Status	Candidates
American Samoa at-large	Amata Coleman Radewagen	Republican	2014	Incumbent's intent unknown	TBD
District of Columbia at-large	Robert White	Democratic	2026	Incumbent's intent unknown	TBD
Guam at-large	Alicia Limtiaco	Democratic	2026	Incumbent's intent unknown	TBD
Northern Mariana Islands at-large	Kimberlyn King-Hinds	Republican	2024	Incumbent's intent unknown	TBD
Puerto Rico at-large	Pablo Hernández Rivera	Popular Democratic/ Democratic	2024	Incumbent running	▌Pablo Hernández Rivera (PPD/Democratic)
U.S. Virgin Islands at-large	Janelle Sarauw	Democratic	2026	Incumbent's intent unknown	TBD

== See also ==
- 2028 United States elections
  - 2028 United States Senate elections
  - 2028 United States gubernatorial elections
- 120th United States Congress
- 121st United States Congress
