= 120th United States Congress =

2027–2029 U.S. legislative term

←	119th	121st	→
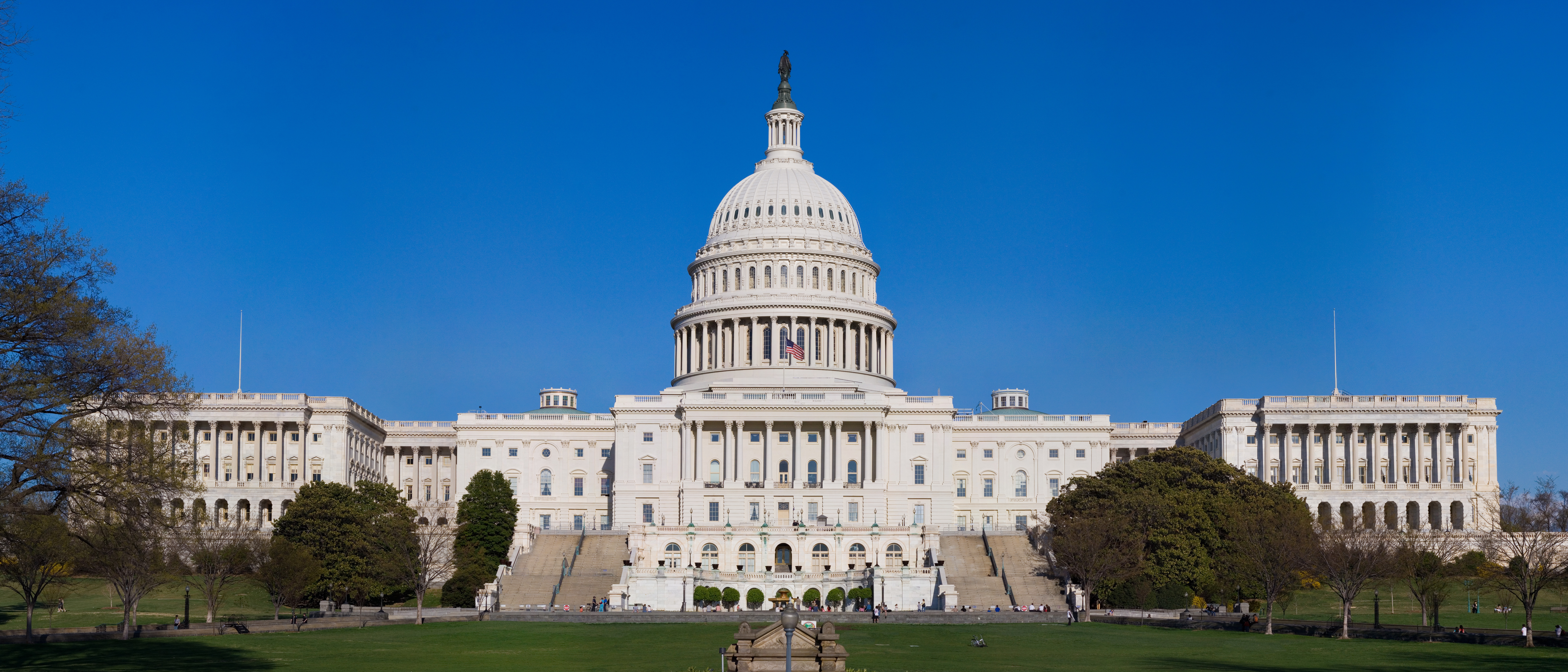

Overview
- Legislative body: United States Congress
- Jurisdiction: United States
- Term: January 3, 2027 – January 3, 2029

Senate
- Members: 100
- President: JD Vance (R)
- Party control: Democratic

House of Representatives
- Members: 435 representatives 6 non-voting delegates
- Speaker: TBD
- Party control: Democratic

The 120th United States Congress is the upcoming meeting of the legislative branch of the United States federal government, composed of the United States Senate and the United States House of Representatives. It will convene on January 3, 2027, during the final two years of Donald Trump's second presidency.

The Democratic Party won a majority in both chambers in the November 3, 2026, midterm elections.

The 120th Congress will include several firsts in the Senate: Abdul El-Sayed (D-MI) will be its first Muslim member, Chris Pappas (D-NH) its first openly gay man, and Peggy Flanagan (D-MN) and Mary Peltola (D-AK) its first Native American women, with Peltola also its first Alaska Native member.

== Party summary ==
Resignations and new members are discussed in the "Changes in membership" section:

=== Senate party summary ===
Senate membership

Beginning January 3, 2027

	Party (shading shows control)			Total	Vacant
	Democratic	Independent (Note: All self-identified independents caucus with the Democrats.)	Republican	Total	Vacant
End of previous Congress	46	2	52	100	0
Begin (January 3, 2027)	54	2	44	100	0
Current voting share	56%		44%		

=== House party summary ===
House membership

	Party (shading shows control)			Total	Vacant
	Democratic	Independent	Republican	Total	Vacant
End of previous Congress	214	1 (Note: Independent Kevin Kiley caucused with the Republicans.)	218	433	2
Begin (January 3, 2027)		0		435	0
Current voting share	0.0%	0.0%	0.0%		
Non-voting members	4 (Note: Includes a Popular Democratic Party member who is also affiliated as a Democrat.)	0	2	6	0

== Leadership ==
Note: Democrats refer to themselves as a "caucus"; Republicans refer to themselves as a "conference".

=== Senate leadership ===
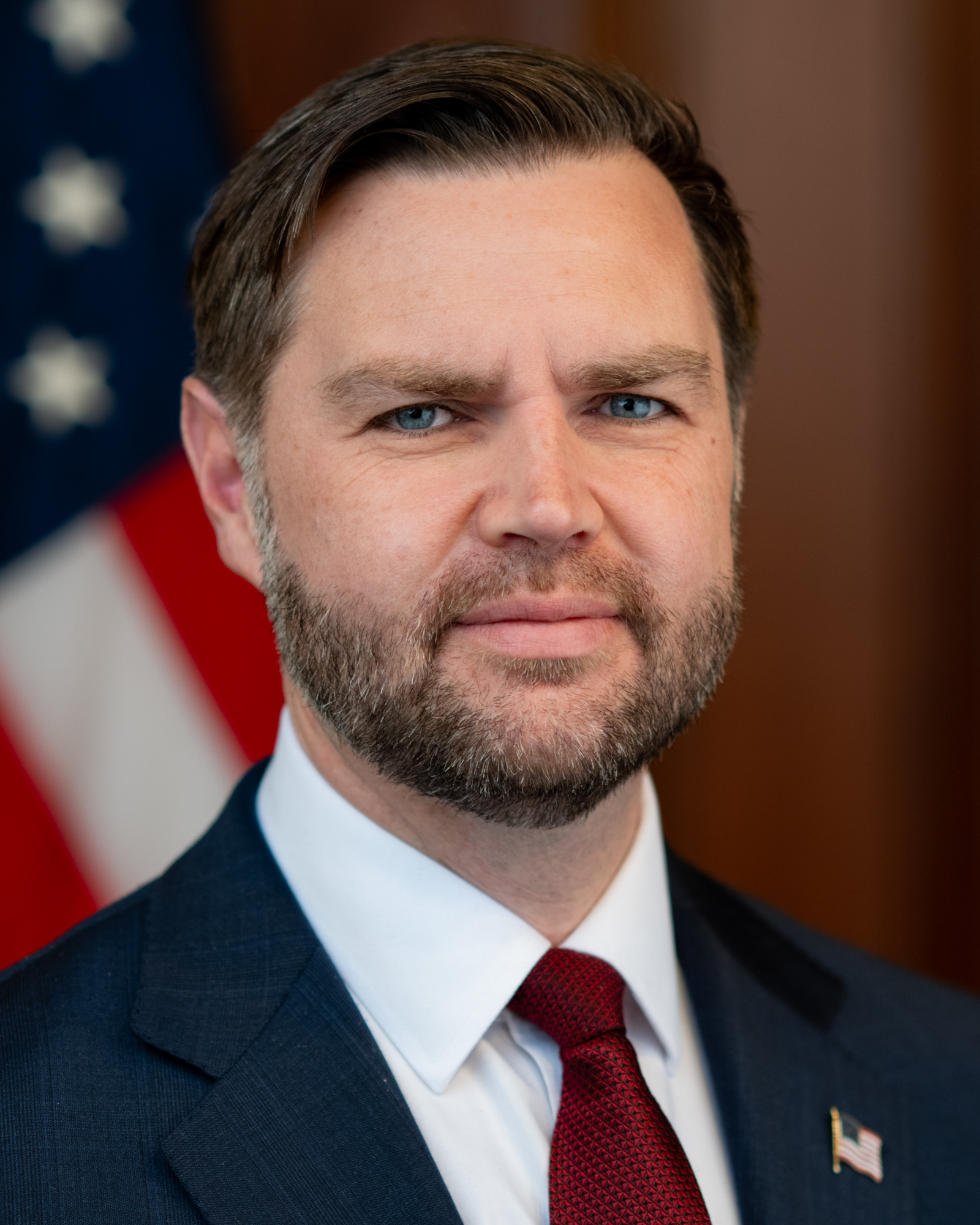
Senate President JD Vance (R)

==== Senate presiding officers ====
- President of the Senate: JD Vance (R)
- President pro tempore: TBD (D)

==== Senate majority (Democratic) leadership ====
- Majority Leader and Chair of the Senate Democratic Caucus: TBD
- Majority Whip: TBD

==== Senate minority (Republican) leadership ====
- Minority Leader: John Thune (SD)
- Minority Whip: John Barrasso (WY)
- Chair of the Senate Republican Conference: Tom Cotton (AR)
- Chair of the National Republican Senatorial Committee: Bernie Moreno (OH)

=== House leadership ===
==== House presiding officer ====
- Speaker: TBD

==== House majority (Democratic) leadership ====
- Majority Leader and Chair of the House Democratic Steering and Policy Committee: Katherine Clark (MA 5)
- Majority Whip: Pete Aguilar (CA 33)
- Chair of the House Democratic Caucus: Ted Lieu (CA 36)
- Assistant Democratic Leader: Joe Neguse (CO 2)
- Vice Chair of the House Democratic Caucus: Lauren Underwood (IL 14)
- Chair of the Democratic Congressional Campaign Committee: TBD

==== House minority (Republican) leadership ====
- Minority Leader: Jim Jordan (OH 4)
- Minority Whip: Tom Emmer (MN 6)
- Chair of the House Republican Conference: Lisa McClain (MI 9)
- Chair of the National Republican Congressional Committee: Brian Jack (GA 3)

== Members ==
=== Senate ===
The numbers refer to their Senate classes. All class 2 seats were contested in the November 2026 elections. In this Congress, class 2 means their term will commence in the current Congress, requiring re-election in 2032; class 3 means their term ends with this Congress, requiring re-election in 2028; and class 1 means their term began in the last Congress, requiring re-election in 2030.

==== Alabama ====
▌2. Barry Moore (R)
▌3. Katie Britt (R)

==== Alaska ====
▌2. Mary Peltola (D)
▌3. Lisa Murkowski (R)

==== Arizona ====
▌1. Ruben Gallego (D)
▌3. Mark Kelly (D)

==== Arkansas ====
▌2. Tom Cotton (R)
▌3. John Boozman (R)

==== California ====
▌1. Adam Schiff (D)
▌3. Alex Padilla (D)

==== Colorado ====
▌2. John Hickenlooper (D)
▌3. Michael Bennet (D)

==== Connecticut ====
▌1. Chris Murphy (D)
▌3. Richard Blumenthal (D)

==== Delaware ====
▌1. Lisa Blunt Rochester (D)
▌2. Chris Coons (D)

==== Florida ====
▌1. Rick Scott (R)
▌3. Ashley Moody (R)

==== Georgia ====
▌2. Jon Ossoff (D)
▌3. Raphael Warnock (D)

==== Hawaii ====
▌1. Mazie Hirono (D)
▌3. Brian Schatz (D)

==== Idaho ====
▌2. Jim Risch (R)
▌3. Mike Crapo (R)

==== Illinois ====
▌2. Juliana Stratton (D)
▌3. Tammy Duckworth (D)

==== Indiana ====
▌1. Jim Banks (R)
▌3. Todd Young (R)

==== Iowa ====
▌2. Josh Turek (D)
▌3. Chuck Grassley (R)

==== Kansas ====
▌2. Adam Hamilton (D)
▌3. Jerry Moran (R)

==== Kentucky ====
▌2. Andy Barr (R)
▌3. Rand Paul (R)

==== Louisiana ====
▌2. Julia Letlow (R)
▌3. John Kennedy (R)

==== Maine ====
▌1. Angus King (I)
▌2. Troy Jackson (D)

==== Maryland ====
▌1. Angela Alsobrooks (D)
▌3. Chris Van Hollen (D)

==== Massachusetts ====
▌1. Elizabeth Warren (D)
▌2. Ed Markey (D)

==== Michigan ====
▌1. Elissa Slotkin (D)
▌2. Abdul El-Sayed (D)

==== Minnesota ====
▌1. Amy Klobuchar (DFL) (outgoing) (Note: The Minnesota Democratic–Farmer–Labor Party (DFL) is the Minnesota affiliate of the U.S. Democratic Party and its members are counted as Democrats.) (Note: Amy Klobuchar won the gubernatorial election and plans to resign from the Senate. The governor of Minnesota will appoint an interim replacement until a 2027 special election.)
▌2. Peggy Flanagan (DFL)

==== Mississippi ====
▌1. Roger Wicker (R)
▌2. Scott Colom (D)

==== Missouri ====
▌1. Josh Hawley (R)
▌3. Eric Schmitt (R)

==== Montana ====
▌1. Tim Sheehy (R)
▌2. Kurt Alme (R)

==== Nebraska ====
▌1. Deb Fischer (R)
▌2. Pete Ricketts (R)

==== Nevada ====
▌1. Jacky Rosen (D)
▌3. Catherine Cortez Masto (D)

==== New Hampshire ====
▌2. Chris Pappas (D)
▌3. Maggie Hassan (D)

==== New Jersey ====
▌1. Andy Kim (D)
▌2. Cory Booker (D)

==== New Mexico ====
▌1. Martin Heinrich (D)
▌2. Ben Ray Luján (D)

==== New York ====
▌1. Kirsten Gillibrand (D)
▌3. Chuck Schumer (D)

==== North Carolina ====
▌2. Roy Cooper (D)
▌3. Ted Budd (R)

==== North Dakota ====
▌1. Kevin Cramer (R)
▌3. John Hoeven (R)

==== Ohio ====
▌1. Bernie Moreno (R)
▌3. Sherrod Brown (D)

==== Oklahoma ====
▌2. Kevin Hern (R)
▌3. James Lankford (R)

==== Oregon ====
▌2. Jeff Merkley (D)
▌3. Ron Wyden (D)

==== Pennsylvania ====
▌1. Dave McCormick (R)
▌3. John Fetterman (D)

==== Rhode Island ====
▌1. Sheldon Whitehouse (D)
▌2. Jack Reed (D)

==== South Carolina ====
▌2. Annie Andrews (D)
▌3. Tim Scott (R)

==== South Dakota ====
▌2. Mike Rounds (R)
▌3. John Thune (R)

==== Tennessee ====
▌1. Marsha Blackburn (R) (outgoing) (Note: Marsha Blackburn won the gubernatorial election and plans to resign from the Senate. The governor of Tennessee will appoint an interim replacement until a 2028 special election.)
▌2. Bill Hagerty (R)

==== Texas ====
▌1. Ted Cruz (R)
▌2. James Talarico (D)

==== Utah ====
▌1. John Curtis (R)
▌3. Mike Lee (R)

==== Vermont ====
▌1. Bernie Sanders (I)
▌3. Peter Welch (D)

==== Virginia ====
▌1. Tim Kaine (D)
▌2. Mark Warner (D)

==== Washington ====
▌1. Maria Cantwell (D)
▌3. Patty Murray (D)

==== West Virginia ====
▌1. Jim Justice (R)
▌2. Shelley Moore Capito (R)

==== Wisconsin ====
▌1. Tammy Baldwin (D)
▌3. Ron Johnson (R)

==== Wyoming ====
▌1. John Barrasso (R)
▌2. Harriet Hageman (R)

2 Democrats (21 states) 1 Democrat and 1 Independent who caucuses with Democrats (2 states) 1 Democrat and 1 Republican (10 states) 2 Republicans (17 states)

=== Representatives ===
All seats were filled by election in November 2026.

==== Alabama ====
▌1. Jerry Carl (R)
▌2. Shomari Figures (D)
▌3. Mike Rogers (R)
▌4. Robert Aderholt (R)
▌5. Dale Strong (R)
▌6. Gary Palmer (R)
▌7. Terri Sewell (D)

==== Alaska ====
▌At-large. Nick Begich III (R)

==== Arizona ====
▌1. Amish Shah (D)
▌2. Eli Crane (R)
▌3. Yassamin Ansari (D)
▌4. Greg Stanton (D)
▌5. Mark Lamb (R)
▌6. JoAnna Mendoza (D)
▌7. Adelita Grijalva (D)
▌8. Abraham Hamadeh (R)
▌9. Paul Gosar (R)

==== Arkansas ====
▌1. Rick Crawford (R)
▌2. French Hill (R)
▌3. Steve Womack (R)
▌4. Bruce Westerman (R)

==== California ====
▌1. Mike McGuire (D)
▌2. Jared Huffman (D)
▌3. Ami Bera (D)
▌4. Eric Jones (D)
▌5. Tom McClintock (R)
▌6. Richard Pan (D)
▌7. Doris Matsui (D)
▌8. John Garamendi (D)
▌9. Josh Harder (D)
▌10. Mark DeSaulnier (D)
▌11. Scott Wiener (D)
▌12. Lateefah Simon (D)
▌13. Adam Gray (D)
▌14. Aisha Wahab (D)
▌15. Kevin Mullin (D)
▌16. Sam Liccardo (D)
▌17. Ro Khanna (D)
▌18. Zoe Lofgren (D)
▌19. Jimmy Panetta (D)
▌20. Vince Fong (R)
▌21. Jim Costa (D)
▌22. Randy Villegas (D)
▌23. Jay Obernolte (R)
▌24. Salud Carbajal (D)
▌25. Raul Ruiz (D)
▌26. Jacqui Irwin (D)
▌27. George T. Whitesides (D)
▌28. Judy Chu (D)
▌29. Luz Rivas (D)
▌30. Laura Friedman (D)
▌31. Gil Cisneros (D)
▌32. Brad Sherman (D)
▌33. Pete Aguilar (D)
▌34. Angela Gonzales-Torres (D)
▌35. Norma Torres (D)
▌36. Ted Lieu (D)
▌37. Sydney Kamlager-Dove (D)
▌38. Hilda Solis (D)
▌39. Mark Takano (D)
▌40. Ken Calvert (R)
▌41. Linda Sánchez (D)
▌42. Robert Garcia (D)
▌43. Maxine Waters (D)
▌44. Nanette Barragán (D)
▌45. Derek Tran (D)
▌46. Lou Correa (D)
▌47. Dave Min (D)
▌48. Marni von Wilpert (D)
▌49. Mike Levin (D)
▌50. Scott Peters (D)
▌51. Sara Jacobs (D)
▌52. Juan Vargas (D)

==== Colorado ====
▌1. Melat Kiros (D)
▌2. Joe Neguse (D)
▌3. Jeff Hurd (R)
▌4. Eileen Laubacher (D)
▌5. Jessica Killin (D)
▌6. Jason Crow (D)
▌7. Brittany Pettersen (D)
▌8. Manny Rutinel (D)

==== Connecticut ====
▌1. Luke Bronin (D)
▌2. Joe Courtney (D)
▌3. Rosa DeLauro (D)
▌4. Jim Himes (D)
▌5. Jahana Hayes (D)

==== Delaware ====
▌At-large. Sarah McBride (D)

==== Florida ====
▌1. Jimmy Patronis (R)
▌2. Austin Rogers (R)
▌3. Kat Cammack (R)
▌4. Aaron Bean (R)
▌5. John Rutherford (R)
▌6. Randy Fine (R)
▌7. Ryan Elijah (R)
▌8. Mike Haridopolos (R)
▌9. Darren Soto (D)
▌10. Maxwell Frost (D)
▌11. Joe Strada (R)
▌12. Gus Bilirakis (R)
▌13. Anna Paulina Luna (R)
▌14. Kathy Castor (D)
▌15. Laurel Lee (R)
▌16. Sydney Gruters (R)
▌17. Greg Steube (R)
▌18. Scott Franklin (R)
▌19. Jim Schwartzel (R)
▌20. Debbie Wasserman Schultz (D)
▌21. Brian Mast (R)
▌22. Pia Dandiya (D)
▌23. Lois Frankel (D)
▌24. Oliver Gilbert (D)
▌25. Jared Moskowitz (D)
▌26. Mario Díaz-Balart (R)
▌27. María Elvira Salazar (R)
▌28. Carlos A. Gimenez (R)

==== Georgia ====
▌1. Jim Kingston (R)
▌2. Sanford Bishop (D)
▌3. Brian Jack (R)
▌4. Hank Johnson (D)
▌5. Nikema Williams (D)
▌6. Lucy McBath (D)
▌7. Rich McCormick (R)
▌8. Austin Scott (R)
▌9. Andrew Clyde (R)
▌10. Houston Gaines (R)
▌11. John Cowan (R)
▌12. Rick Allen (R)
▌13. Jasmine Clark (D)
▌14. Clay Fuller (R)

==== Hawaii ====
▌1. Ed Case (D)
▌2. Jill Tokuda (D)

==== Idaho ====
▌1. Russ Fulcher (R)
▌2. Mike Simpson (R)

==== Illinois ====
▌1. Jonathan Jackson (D)
▌2. Donna Miller (D)
▌3. Delia Ramirez (D)
▌4. Patty García (D)
▌5. Mike Quigley (D)
▌6. Sean Casten (D)
▌7. La Shawn Ford (D)
▌8. Melissa Bean (D)
▌9. Daniel Biss (D)
▌10. Brad Schneider (D)
▌11. Bill Foster (D)
▌12. Mike Bost (R)
▌13. Nikki Budzinski (D)
▌14. Lauren Underwood (D)
▌15. Mary Miller (R)
▌16. Darin LaHood (R)
▌17. Eric Sorensen (D)

==== Indiana ====
▌1. Frank J. Mrvan (D)
▌2. Rudy Yakym (R)
▌3. Marlin Stutzman (R)
▌4. Jim Baird (R)
▌5. J. D. Ford (D)
▌6. Jefferson Shreve (R)
▌7. André Carson (D)
▌8. Mark Messmer (R)
▌9. Erin Houchin (R)

==== Iowa ====
▌1. Christina Bohannan (D)
▌2. Lindsay James (D)
▌3. Sarah Trone Garriott (D)
▌4. Chris McGowan (R)

==== Kansas ====
▌1. Tracey Mann (R)
▌2. Derek Schmidt (R)
▌3. Sharice Davids (D)
▌4. Ron Estes (R)

==== Kentucky ====
▌1. James Comer (R)
▌2. Brett Guthrie (R)
▌3. Morgan McGarvey (D)
▌4. Ed Gallrein (R)
▌5. Hal Rogers (R)
▌6. Zach Dembo (D)

==== Louisiana ====
▌1. Steve Scalise (R)
▌2. Troy Carter (D)
▌3. Clay Higgins (R)
▌4. Mike Johnson (R)
▌5. TBD
▌6. TBD

==== Maine ====
▌1. Chellie Pingree (D)
▌2. Paul LePage (R)

==== Maryland ====
▌1. Andy Harris (R)
▌2. Johnny Olszewski (D)
▌3. Sarah Elfreth (D)
▌4. Glenn Ivey (D)
▌5. Adrian Boafo (D)
▌6. April McClain Delaney (D)
▌7. Kweisi Mfume (D)
▌8. Jamie Raskin (D)

==== Massachusetts ====
▌1. Richard Neal (D)
▌2. Jim McGovern (D)
▌3. Lori Trahan (D)
▌4. Jake Auchincloss (D)
▌5. Katherine Clark (D)
▌6. Dan Koh (D)
▌7. Ayanna Pressley (D)
▌8. Stephen Lynch (D)
▌9. Bill Keating (D)

==== Michigan ====
▌1. Jack Bergman (R)
▌2. John Moolenaar (R)
▌3. Hillary Scholten (D)
▌4. Sean McCann (D)
▌5. Tim Walberg (R)
▌6. Debbie Dingell (D)
▌7. William Lawrence (D)
▌8. Kristen McDonald Rivet (D)
▌9. Lisa McClain (R)
▌10. Christina Hines (D)
▌11. Jeremy Moss (D)
▌12. Rashida Tlaib (D)
▌13. Donavan McKinney (D)

==== Minnesota ====
▌1. Jake Johnson (DFL)
▌2. Matt Little (DFL)
▌3. Kelly Morrison (DFL)
▌4. Betty McCollum (DFL)
▌5. Ilhan Omar (DFL)
▌6. Tom Emmer (R)
▌7. Michelle Fischbach (R)
▌8. Pete Stauber (R)

==== Mississippi ====
▌1. Trent Kelly (R)
▌2. Bennie Thompson (D)
▌3. Michael Guest (R)
▌4. Mike Ezell (R)

==== Missouri ====
▌1. Wesley Bell (D)
▌2. Fred Wellman (D)
▌3. Bob Onder (R)
▌4. Mark Alford (R)
▌5. Emanuel Cleaver (D)
▌6. Chris Stigall (R)
▌7. Eric Burlison (R)
▌8. Jason Smith (R)

==== Montana ====
▌1. Sam Forstag (D)
▌2. Troy Downing (R)

==== Nebraska ====
▌1. Mike Flood (R)
▌2. Denise Powell (D)
▌3. Adrian Smith (R)

==== Nevada ====
▌1. Dina Titus (D)
▌2. Teresa Benitez-Thompson (D)
▌3. Susie Lee (D)
▌4. Steven Horsford (D)

==== New Hampshire ====
▌1. Stefany Shaheen (D)
▌2. Maggie Goodlander (D)

==== New Jersey ====
▌1. Donald Norcross (D)
▌2. Zack Mullock (D)
▌3. Herb Conaway (D)
▌4. Chris Smith (R)
▌5. Josh Gottheimer (D)
▌6. Frank Pallone (D)
▌7. Rebecca Bennett (D)
▌8. Rob Menendez (D)
▌9. Nellie Pou (D)
▌10. LaMonica McIver (D)
▌11. Analilia Mejia (D)
▌12. Adam Hamawy (D)

==== New Mexico ====
▌1. Melanie Stansbury (D)
▌2. Gabe Vasquez (D)
▌3. Teresa Leger Fernández (D)

==== New York ====
▌1. Nick LaLota (R)
▌2. Andrew Garbarino (R)
▌3. Tom Suozzi (D)
▌4. Laura Gillen (D)
▌5. Gregory Meeks (D)
▌6. Grace Meng (D)
▌7. Claire Valdez (D)
▌8. Hakeem Jeffries (D)
▌9. Yvette Clarke (D)
▌10. Brad Lander (D)
▌11. Nicole Malliotakis (R)
▌12. Micah Lasher (D)
▌13. Darializa Avila Chevalier (D)
▌14. Alexandria Ocasio-Cortez (D)
▌15. Ritchie Torres (D)
▌16. George Latimer (D)
▌17. Cait Conley (D)
▌18. Pat Ryan (D)
▌19. Josh Riley (D)
▌20. Paul Tonko (D)
▌21. Anthony Constantino (R)
▌22. John Mannion (D)
▌23. Nick Langworthy (R)
▌24. Claudia Tenney (R)
▌25. Joseph Morelle (D)
▌26. Tim Kennedy (D)

==== North Carolina ====
▌1. Don Davis (D)
▌2. Deborah Ross (D)
▌3. Raymond Smith Jr. (D)
▌4. Valerie Foushee (D)
▌5. Chuck Hubbard (D)
▌6. Cyril Jefferson (D)
▌7. David Rouzer (R)
▌8. Mark Harris (R)
▌9. Richard Ojeda (D)
▌10. Pat Harrigan (R)
▌11. Jamie Ager (D)
▌12. Alma Adams (D)
▌13. Paul Barringer (D)
▌14. LaKesha Womack (D)

==== North Dakota ====
▌At-large. Julie Fedorchak (R)

==== Ohio ====
▌1. Greg Landsman (D)
▌2. David Taylor (R)
▌3. Joyce Beatty (D)
▌4. Jim Jordan (R)
▌5. Bob Latta (R)
▌6. Michael Rulli (R)
▌7. Brian Poindexter (D)
▌8. Warren Davidson (R)
▌9. Marcy Kaptur (D)
▌10. Kristina Knickerbocker (D)
▌11. Shontel Brown (D)
▌12. Troy Balderson (R)
▌13. Emilia Sykes (D)
▌14. David Joyce (R)
▌15. Don Leonard (D)

==== Oklahoma ====
▌1. Mark Tedford (R)
▌2. Josh Brecheen (R)
▌3. Frank Lucas (R)
▌4. Tom Cole (R)
▌5. Stephanie Bice (R)

==== Oregon ====
▌1. Suzanne Bonamici (D)
▌2. Cliff Bentz (R)
▌3. Maxine Dexter (D)
▌4. Val Hoyle (D)
▌5. Janelle Bynum (D)
▌6. Andrea Salinas (D)

==== Pennsylvania ====
▌1. Bob Harvie (D)
▌2. Brendan Boyle (D)
▌3. Chris Rabb (D)
▌4. Madeleine Dean (D)
▌5. Mary Gay Scanlon (D)
▌6. Chrissy Houlahan (D)
▌7. Bob Brooks (D)
▌8. Paige Cognetti (D)
▌9. Dan Meuser (R)
▌10. Janelle Stelson (D)
▌11. Lloyd Smucker (R)
▌12. Summer Lee (D)
▌13. John Joyce (R)
▌14. Guy Reschenthaler (R)
▌15. Glenn Thompson (R)
▌16. Mike Kelly (R)
▌17. Chris Deluzio (D)

==== Rhode Island ====
▌1. Gabe Amo (D)
▌2. Seth Magaziner (D)

==== South Carolina ====
▌1. Nancy Lacore (D)
▌2. Joe Wilson (R)
▌3. Sheri Biggs (R)
▌4. William Timmons (R)
▌5. Wes Climer (R)
▌6. Jim Clyburn (D)
▌7. Russell Fry (R)

==== South Dakota ====
▌At-large. Marty Jackley (R)

==== Tennessee ====
▌1. Diana Harshbarger (R)
▌2. Tim Burchett (R)
▌3. Chuck Fleischmann (R)
▌4. Victoria Broderick (D)
▌5. Charlie Hatcher (R)
▌6. Johnny Garrett (R)
▌7. Matt Van Epps (R)
▌8. David Kustoff (R)
▌9. Brent Taylor (R)

==== Texas ====
▌1. Nathaniel Moran (R)
▌2. Steve Toth (R)
▌3. Keith Self (R)
▌4. Pat Fallon (R)
▌5. Lance Gooden (R)
▌6. Jake Ellzey (R)
▌7. Lizzie Fletcher (D)
▌8. Jessica Hart Steinmann (R)
▌9. Leticia Gutierrez (D)
▌10. Chris Gober (R)
▌11. August Pfluger (R)
▌12. Craig Goldman (R)
▌13. Ronny Jackson (R)
▌14. Randy Weber (R)
▌15. Bobby Pulido (D)
▌16. Veronica Escobar (D)
▌17. Pete Sessions (R)
▌18. Christian Menefee (D)
▌19. Tom Sell (R)
▌20. Joaquin Castro (D)
▌21. Mark Teixeira (R)
▌22. Trever Nehls (R)
▌23. Katy Padilla Stout (D)
▌24. Beth Van Duyne (R)
▌25. Roger Williams (R)
▌26. Brandon Gill (R)
▌27. Michael Cloud (R)
▌28. Henry Cuellar (D)
▌29. Sylvia Garcia (D)
▌30. Frederick Haynes III (D)
▌31. John Carter (R)
▌32. Jace Yarbrough (R)
▌33. Colin Allred (D)
▌34. Vicente Gonzalez (D)
▌35. Johnny Garcia (D)
▌36. Brian Babin (R)
▌37. Greg Casar (D)
▌38. Jon Bonck (R)

==== Utah ====
▌1. Ben McAdams (D)
▌2. Blake Moore (R)
▌3. Celeste Maloy (R)
▌4. Mike Kennedy (R)

==== Vermont ====
▌At-large. Becca Balint (D)

==== Virginia ====
▌1. Shannon Taylor (D)
▌2. Elaine Luria (D)
▌3. Bobby Scott (D)
▌4. Jennifer McClellan (D)
▌5. John McGuire (R)
▌6. Ben Cline (R)
▌7. Eugene Vindman (D)
▌8. Don Beyer (D)
▌9. Morgan Griffith (R)
▌10. Suhas Subramanyam (D)
▌11. James Walkinshaw (D)

==== Washington ====
▌1. Suzan DelBene (D)
▌2. Rick Larsen (D)
▌3. Marie Gluesenkamp Perez (D)
▌4. Amanda McKinney (R)
▌5. Michael Baumgartner (R)
▌6. Emily Randall (D)
▌7. Pramila Jayapal (D)
▌8. Kim Schrier (D)
▌9. Adam Smith (D)
▌10. Marilyn Strickland (D)

==== West Virginia ====
▌1. Carol Miller (R)
▌2. Riley Moore (R)

==== Wisconsin ====
▌1. Mitchell Berman (D)
▌2. Mark Pocan (D)
▌3. Rebecca Cooke (D)
▌4. Gwen Moore (D)
▌5. Scott Fitzgerald (R)
▌6. Glenn Grothman (R)
▌7. Michael Alfonso (R)
▌8. Tony Wied (R)

==== Wyoming ====
▌At-large. Chuck Gray (R)

==== Non-voting members ====
▌American Samoa: Amata Coleman Radewagen (R)
▌District of Columbia: Robert White (D)
▌Guam: Alicia Limtiaco (D)
▌Northern Mariana Islands: Kimberlyn King-Hinds (R)
▌▌Puerto Rico: Pablo Hernández Rivera (PPD/D) (Note: Puerto Rico's non-voting member, the Resident Commissioner, is elected every four years. This is the only member of the House to serve four-year terms.)
▌United States Virgin Islands: Janelle Sarauw (D)

Democrats (256) Republicans (169) Uncalled races (8) Election run-off on December 12, 2026 (2)

== Changes in membership ==
=== Senate membership changes ===
Senate changes
State (class)	Vacated by	Reason for change	Successor	Date of successor's formal installation (Note: When seated or oath administered, not necessarily when service began.)
Minnesota (1)	Amy Klobuchar (DFL)	Incumbent resigning January 2027 after being elected Governor of Minnesota. Successor will be appointed until a special election in November 2027.	TBD	
Tennessee (1)	Marsha Blackburn (R)	Incumbent resigning January 2027 after being elected Governor of Tennessee. Successor will be appointed until a special election in November 2028.	TBD	

== See also ==
- 2028 United States elections
  - 2028 United States Senate elections
  - 2028 United States House of Representatives elections
