= 2026 House Republican Conference leadership election =

A leadership election was held by the House Republican Conference on November 10, 2026, before the beginning of the 120th United States Congress. The election determined who will be nominated by the caucus for the speakership election as well as other leadership positions in the House Republican Conference. Representatives had until November 6 to declare their candidacy.

== Minority leader ==
2026 House Republican Conference minority leader election
- November 10, 2026

Republican Representatives and Representative-elect in the 120th Congress 90 votes needed for a majority

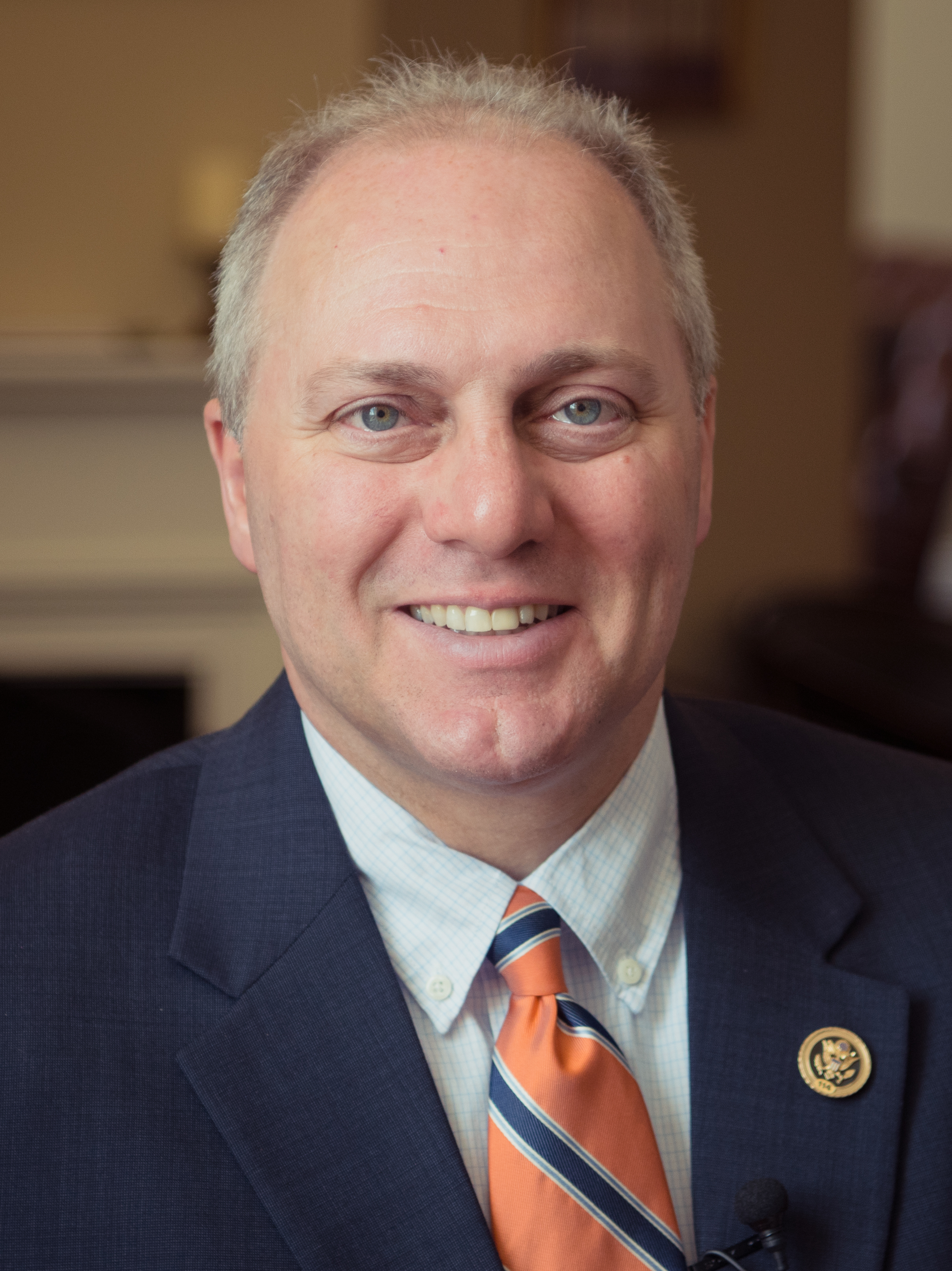
Candidate	Jim Jordan	Steve Scalise
Home state	Ohio's 4th	Louisiana's 1st
Members vote	106	73
Percentage	59.22%	40.78%
Leader before election
Mike Johnson
Elected Leader
Jim Jordan

House Republicans lost the majority in the 2026 House elections and will be electing their minority leader. Incumbent floor leader Steve Scalise has said he will run. Republican Speaker of the House Mike Johnson ruled out a run for Minority Leader. The minority leader will be the party's nominee for Speaker of the House.

=== Candidates ===
- Jim Jordan, chair of the House Judiciary Committee (since 2023), Ohio's 4th congressional district (since 2007)
- Steve Scalise, incumbent House majority leader (since 2023), Louisiana's 1st congressional district (since 2008)

=== Results ===
2026 House Republican Conference minority leader election
Party	Candidate	Votes	%
Republican	Jim Jordan	106	59.22
Republican	Steve Scalise (incumbent)	73	40.78
Total votes		179	100.00

== Minority whip ==
2026 House Republican Conference minority whip election
- November 10, 2026

Republican Representatives and Representative-elect in the 120th Congress 91 votes needed for a majority
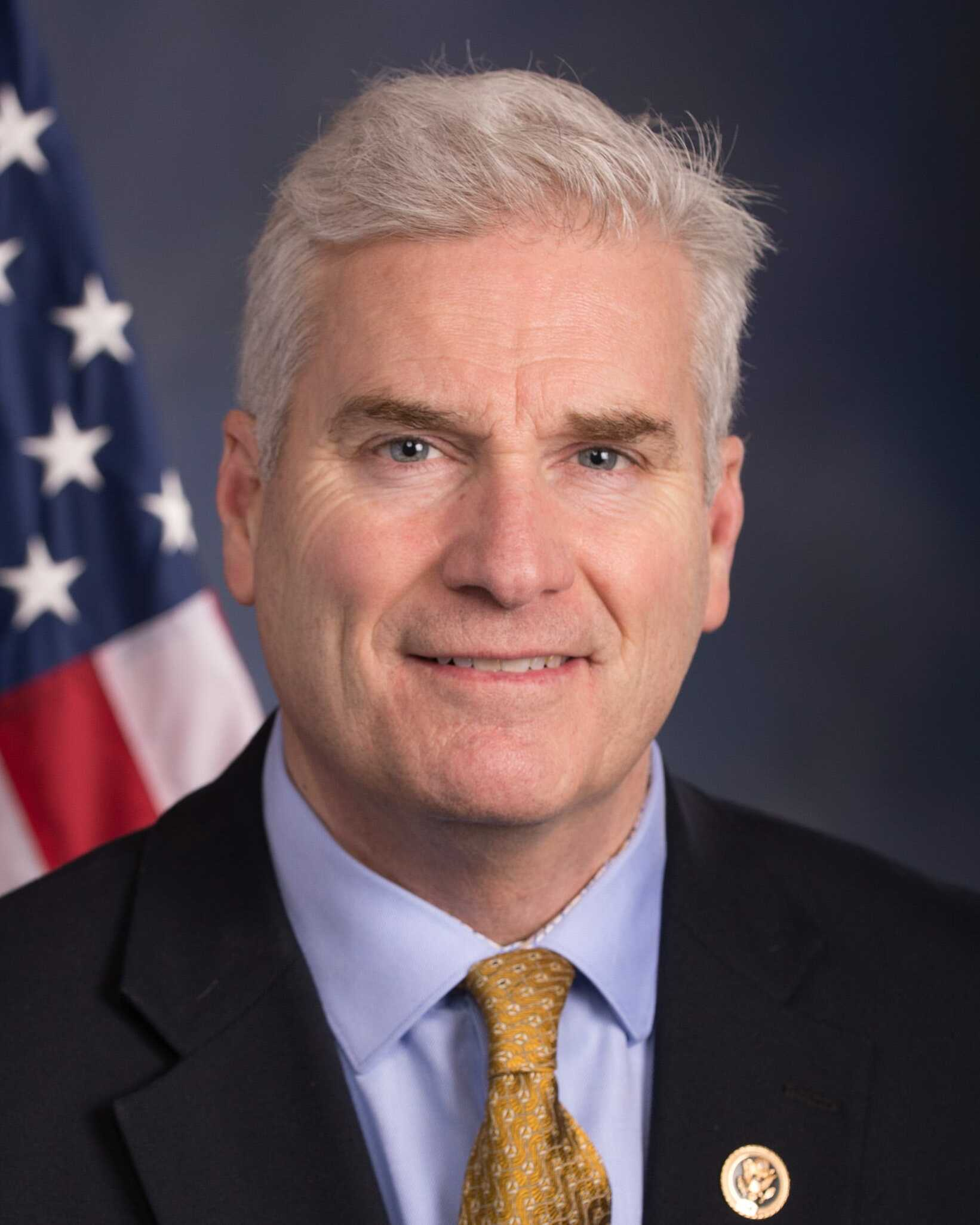

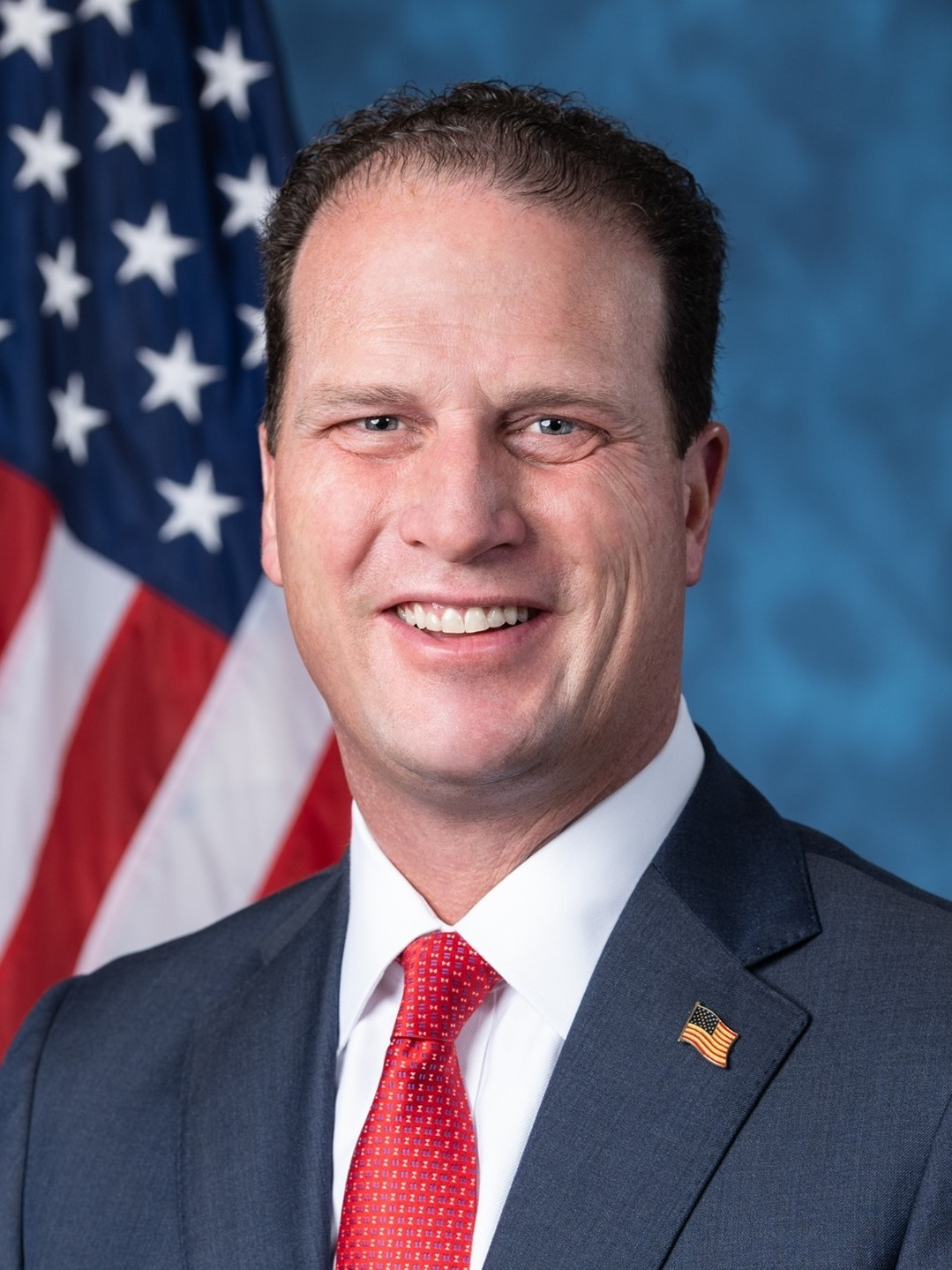
Candidate	Tom Emmer	August Pfluger
Home state	Minnesota's 6th	Texas's 11th
Members vote	103	76
Percentage	57.22%	42.22%
Whip before election
Tom Emmer
Elected Whip
Tom Emmer

Incumbent Whip Tom Emmer announced he would be seeking re-election as whip. He was challenged by the chair of the Republican Study Committee August Pfluger.

=== Candidates ===
- Tom Emmer, incumbent whip (since 2023), Minnesota's 6th congressional district (since 2015)
- August Pfluger, chair of the Republican Study Committee (since 2025), Texas's 11th congressional district (since 2021)

=== Results ===
2026 House Republican Conference minority whip election
Party	Candidate	Votes	%
Republican	Tom Emmer (incumbent)	103	57.22
Republican	August Pfluger	76	42.22
Republican	Other	1	0.56
Total votes		180	100.00

== Republican Conference chair ==
2026 House Republican Conference chair election
- November 10, 2026

Republican Representatives and Representative-elect in the 120th Congress 89 votes needed for a majority
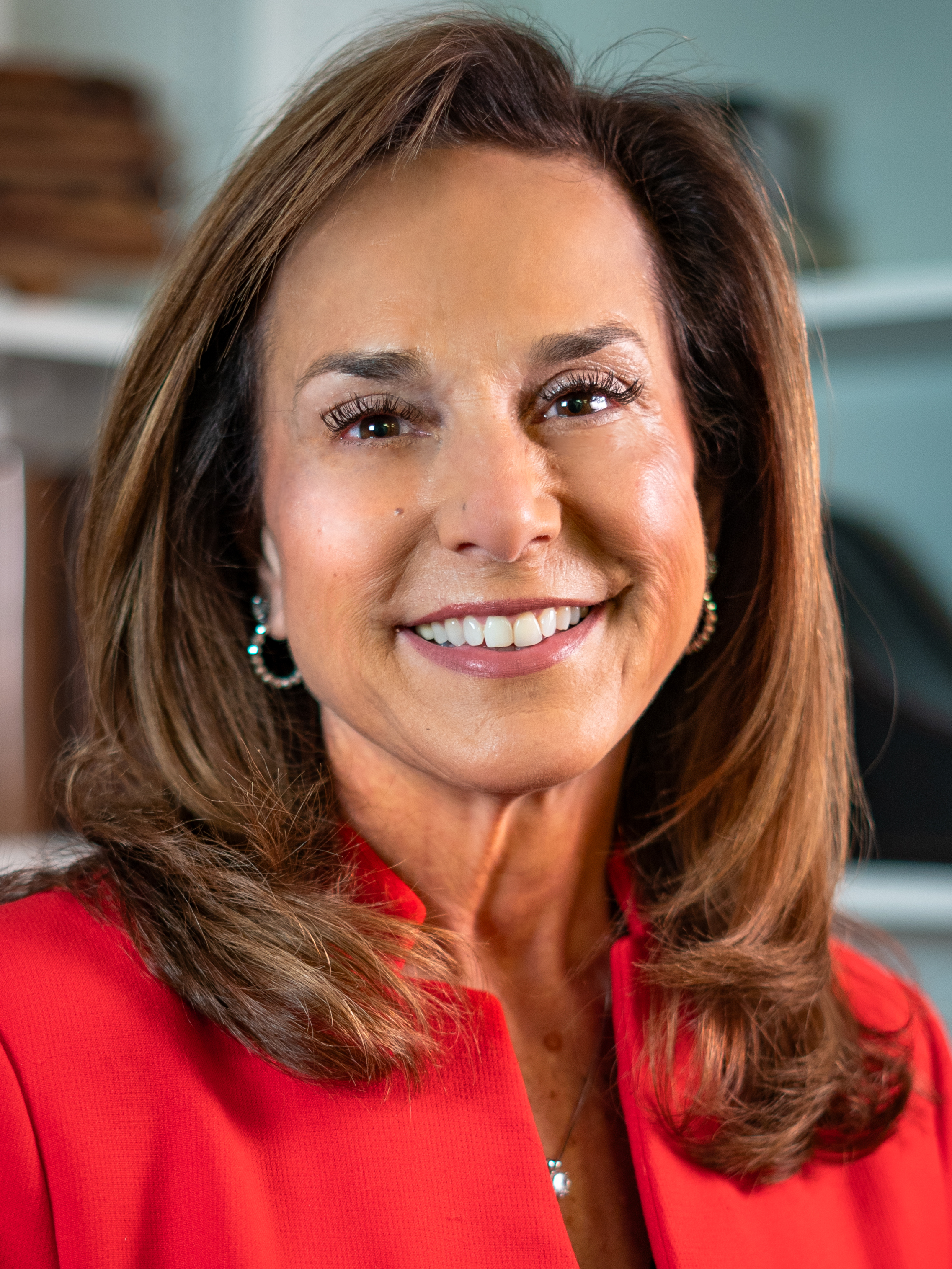

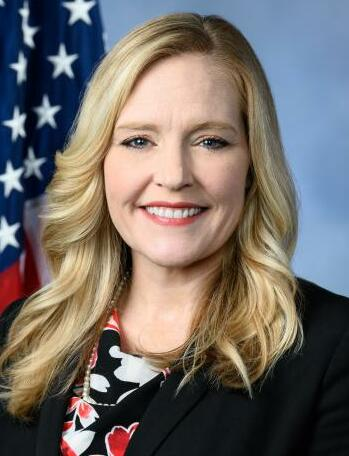

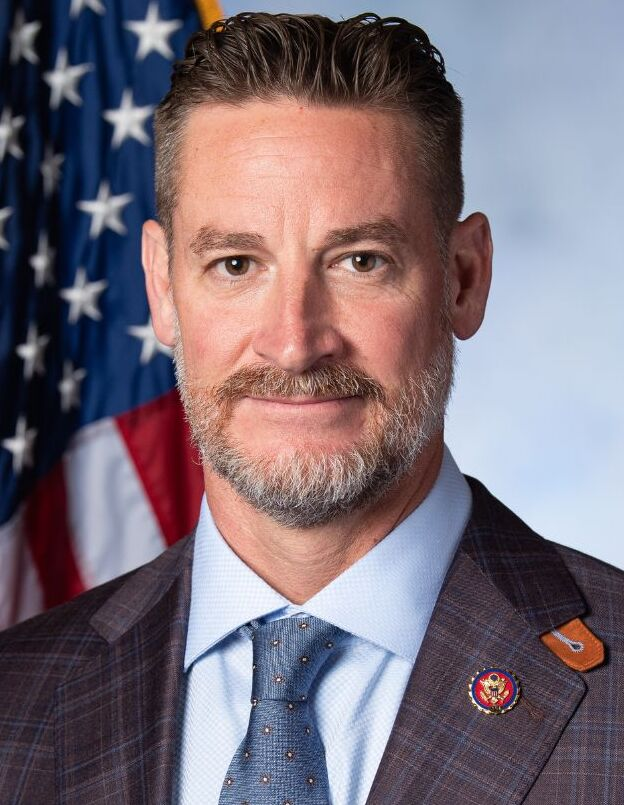
Candidate	Lisa McClain	Erin Houchin	Greg Steube
Home state	Michigan's 9th	Indiana's 9th	Florida's 17th
Members vote	93	57	27
Percentage	52.54%	32.20%	15.25%
Chair before election
Lisa McClain
Elected Chair
Lisa McClain

Incumbent House Republican Conference chair Lisa McClain announced her intention to run for re-election.

=== Candidates ===
- Erin Houchin, incumbent conference secretary (since 2025), Indiana's 9th congressional district (since 2023)
- Lisa McClain, incumbent conference chair (since 2025), Michigan's 9th congressional district (since 2021)
- Greg Steube, Florida's 17th congressional district (since 2019)

=== Results ===
2026 House Republican Conference chair election
Party	Candidate	Votes	%
Republican	Lisa McClain (incumbent)	93	52.54
Republican	Erin Houchin	57	32.20
Republican	Greg Steube	27	15.25
Total votes		177	100.00

== Republican Conference vice chair ==
2026 House Republican Conference vice chair election
- November 10, 2026

Republican Representatives and Representative-elect in the 120th Congress
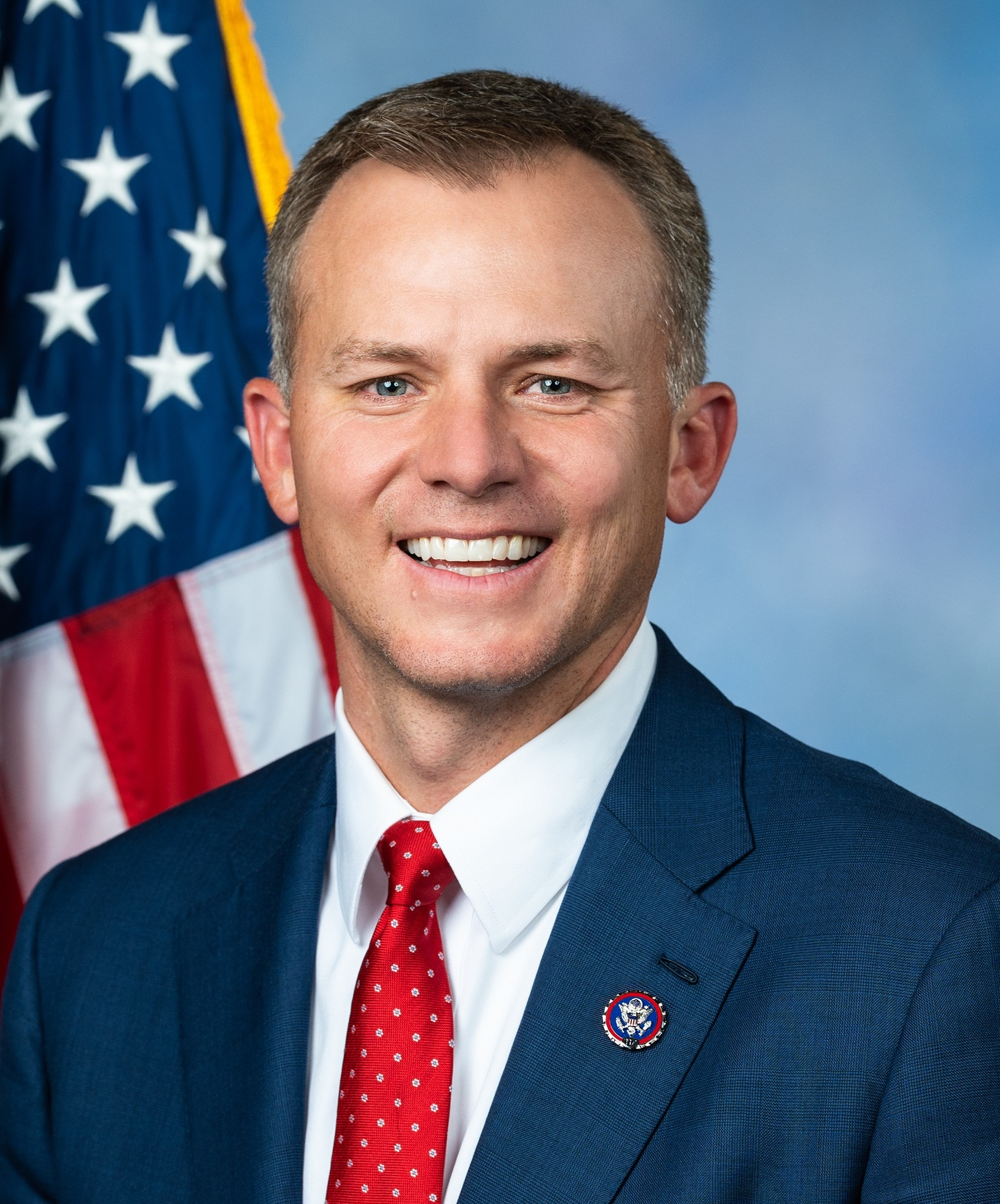
Candidate	Blake Moore
Home state	Utah's 1st
Members vote	Acclamation
Vice Chair before election
Blake Moore
Elected Vice Chair
Blake Moore

Incumbent House Republican Conference vice-chair Blake Moore (Utah's 1st congressional district since 2021) announced his intention to run for re-election.

== Republican Conference secretary ==
2026 House Republican Conference secretary election
- November 10, 2026

Republican Representatives and Representative-elect in the 120th Congress
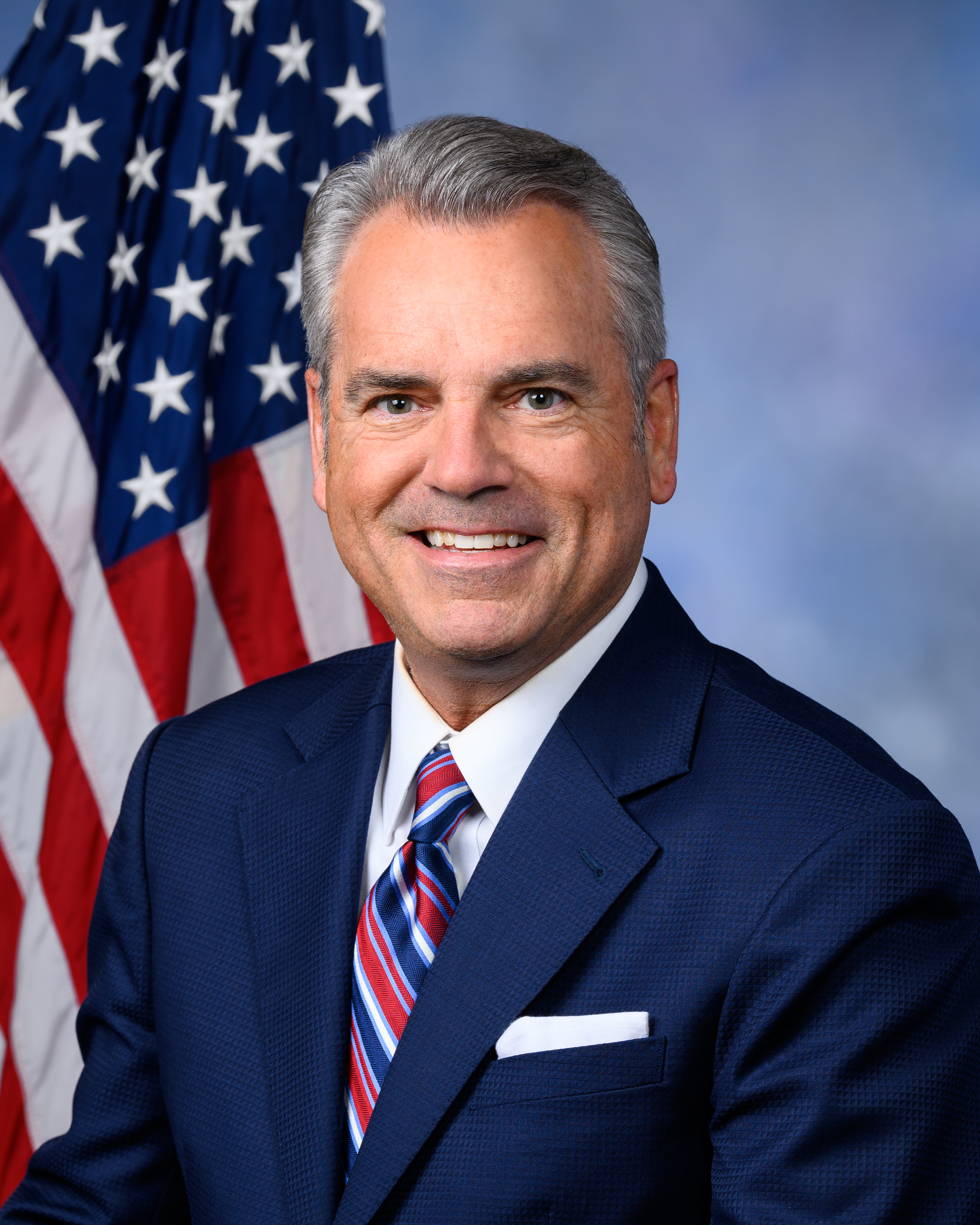
Candidate	Mark Alford
Home state	Missouri's 4th
Members vote	Acclamation
Secretary before election
Erin Houchin
Elected Secretary
Mark Alford

Incumbent House Republican Conference secretary Erin Houchin announced her intention to run for Conference chair, leaving the position open. Mark Alford and Julie Fedorchak both announced their intentions to seek the position. On November 10, Fedorchak withdrew from the election, leaving Alford unopposed.

=== Candidates ===
- Mark Alford, Missouri's 4th congressional district (since 2023)

Withdrawn

- Julie Fedorchak, North Dakota's at-large congressional district (since 2025) (endorsed Alford)

== NRCC Chair ==
2026 National Republican Congressional Committee chair election
- November 10, 2026

Republican Representatives and Representative-elect in the 120th Congress 90 votes needed for a majority
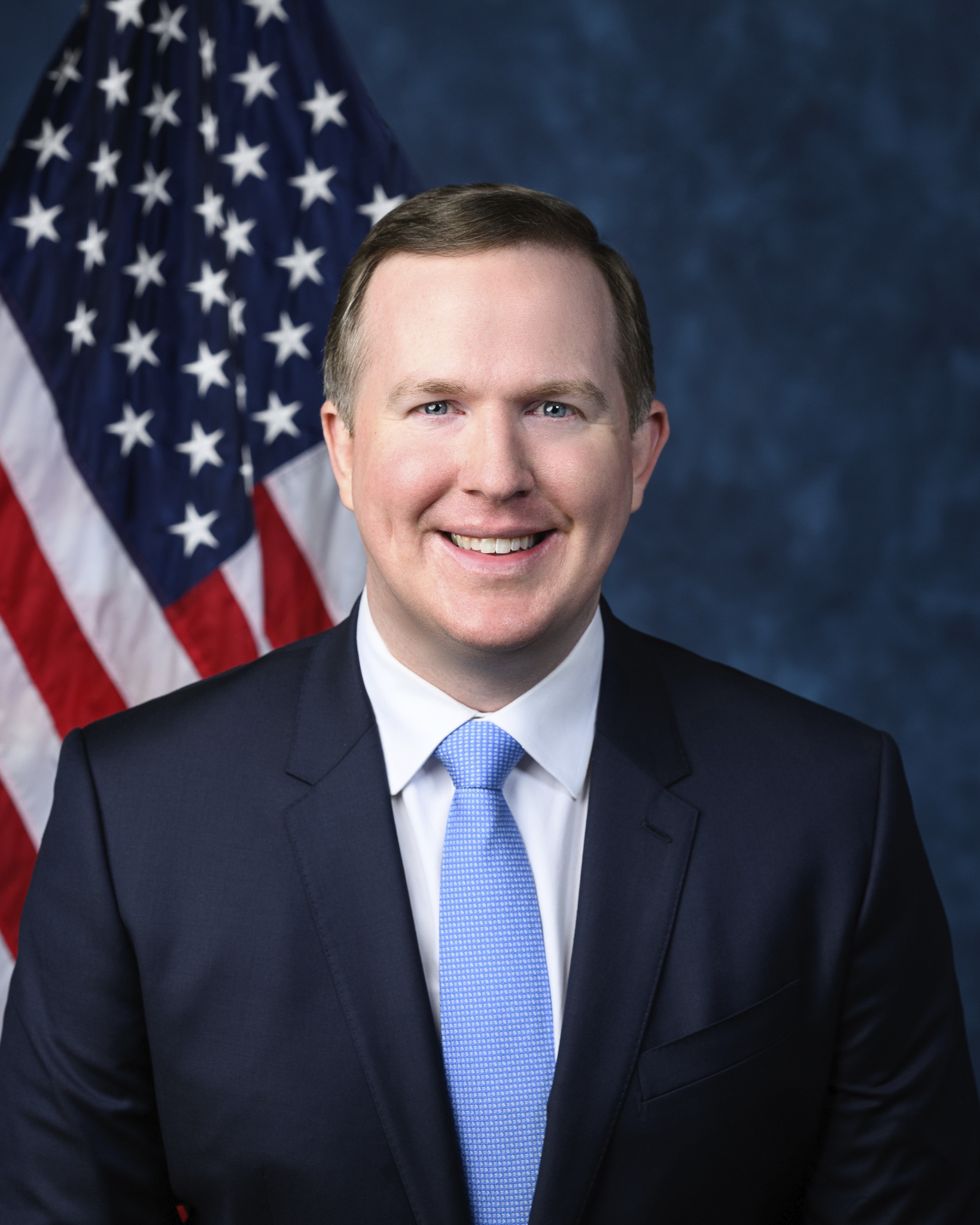

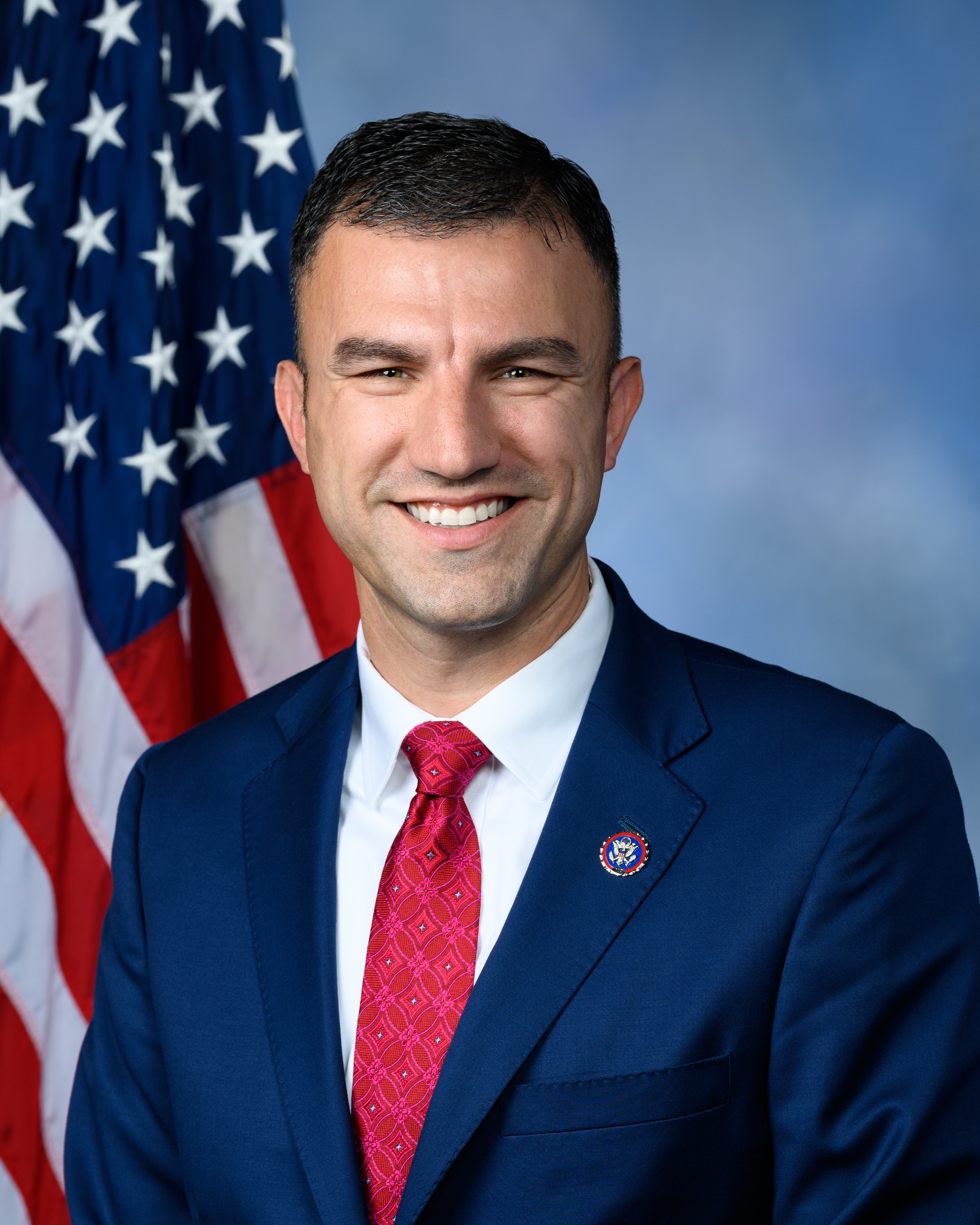
Candidate	Brian Jack	Rudy Yakym
Home state	Georgia's 3rd	Indiana's 2nd
Members vote	125	53
Percentage	70.22%	29.78%
Chair before election
Richard Hudson
Elected Chair
Brian Jack

Incumbent Richard Hudson of North Carolina's 9th congressional district lost re-election to Democrat Richard Ojeda, leaving the race for NRCC chair open.

=== Candidates ===
- Brian Jack, Georgia's 3rd congressional district (since 2025)
- Rudy Yakym, Indiana's 2nd congressional district (since 2022)

=== Results ===
2026 National Republican Congressional Committee chair election
Party	Candidate	Votes	%
Republican	Brian Jack	125	70.22
Republican	Rudy Yakym	53	29.78
Total votes		178	100.00

== RPC Chair ==
Incumbent Republican Policy Committee chair Jay Obernolte (California's 23rd congressional district since 2021) has not announced his intention to run yet.
