= Johnny Garcia (politician) =

American politician

- Garcia in 2026

Member-elect of the U.S. House of Representatives from Texas's 35th district
- Assuming office January 3, 2027
- Succeeding: Greg Casar (redistricted)

Personal details
- Born: 1987 or 1988 (age 38–39) San Antonio, Texas, U.S.
- Party: Democratic
- Education: St. Philip's College (attended)
- Website: Campaign website

Johnny C. Garcia (born 1987/1988) is an American politician from Texas. A member of the Democratic Party, he is the member-elect for Texas's 35th congressional district in the United States House of Representatives.

Garcia attended Memorial High School and St. Philip's College prior to joining the Bexar County Sheriff's Department at the age of 21. He worked in the Bexar County Jail, as a patrol officer, crisis negotiator, and communications director.

In October 2025, Garcia declared his candidacy for the United States House of Representatives in Texas's 35th congressional district in the 2026 elections as a member of the Democratic Party. Garcia finished in second place in the primary election, advancing to a runoff against Maureen Galindo, as neither candidate received a majority of the vote. Garcia won the Democratic Party nomination in the runoff election. He defeated Carlos De La Cruz in the November general election.

U.S. House of Representatives
Preceded by Greg Casar; Redistricted	Member of the U.S. House of Representatives from Texas's 35th congressional district Taking office 2027	Elect
