= 2027 Speaker of the United States House of Representatives election =

- January 3, 2027

Needed to win: Majority of the votes cast
Incumbent speaker
Mike Johnson
Republican

An election will be held on January 3, 2027, to elect the speaker of the United States House of Representatives for the 120th United States Congress.

Incumbent Republican speaker Mike Johnson of Louisiana declined to seek re-election as House Republican leader and Speaker of the House after his party suffered massive losses in the 2026 midterm elections. He is set to be replaced by congressman Jim Jordan as the Republican leader and the nominee for Speaker. Democratic House leader Hakeem Jeffries, who was the runner-up in the last election for Speaker, is once again running.

== Process and conventions ==
The speaker is the presiding officer of the U.S. House of Representatives. The House elects its speaker at the beginning of a new Congress (i.e. biennially, after Election Day) or when a speaker dies, resigns, or is removed from the position intra-term. Since 1839, the House has elected speakers by roll call vote. Following a congressional election and the adjournment of the prior congress, there being no speaker, the House clerk summons, convenes, and calls the House to order. After prayer offered by the House chaplain, the clerk leads the representatives in the Pledge of Allegiance before ordering a roll call conducted by the reading clerk. The clerk and its officers then order and oversee the election of a speaker. During these processes, the clerk must "preserve order and decorum and decide all questions of order", which is subject to appeal to the body.

Traditionally, each of the party caucuses and conferences selects a candidate for the speakership from among its senior leaders prior to the roll call. Representatives are not restricted to voting for the candidate nominated by their party but generally do, as the outcome of the election effectively determines which one is the majority party and consequently will organize the House. Without a speaker, members-elect of the House cannot be sworn in. (Note: The Twentieth Amendment states that all members' terms begin at noon on January 3. Until officially sworn-in, members are referred to as members-elect.) The House is unable to conduct any business other than electing the speaker. Because the rules of the House are adopted for each new Congress, the House will not have rules until the election is complete allowing the members to be sworn in and the House to adopt rules.

Representatives that choose to vote for someone other than their party's nominated candidate usually vote for another member within the party or vote present, which entails abstention. Moreover, as the Constitution does not explicitly state that the speaker must be an incumbent member of the House, it is permissible for representatives to nominate and vote for someone who is not a member of the House at the time, and non-members have been nominated and received a few votes in various speaker elections over the past several years. Nevertheless, every person elected speaker has been a member. Upon winning election, the new speaker is immediately sworn in by the House dean, the chamber's longest-serving member. The new speaker then administers the oath en masse to the rest of the members of the House.

To be elected speaker, a candidate must receive a majority of votes cast, as opposed to a majority of the entire membership of the House. There have only been a few instances during the past century where a person received a majority of the votes cast and thus won the election while failing to obtain a majority of the full membership. This occurred most recently in 2023 when Kevin McCarthy was elected with 216 votes (as opposed to 218). Such a variation in the number of votes necessary to win a given election might arise due to vacancies, absentees, or members being present but not voting. If no candidate wins a majority of the votes cast for a person by name, then the roll call is repeated until a speaker is elected.

== Republican nomination ==
Incumbent Republican Speaker Mike Johnson announced that he would not seek the nomination for minority leader shortly following the 2026 elections. Shortly thereafter, Jim Jordan, who was previously a nominee for speaker in October 2023 elections, announced he would run for House minority leader. Steve Scalise, the incumbent House majority leader and previous speaker nominee, has also announced his intention to run.

Jordan won the election over Scalise 106 votes to 73.

=== Candidates ===
- Jim Jordan, U.S. representative from Ohio's 4th congressional district (2007–present)
- Steve Scalise, House majority leader (2023–present) from Louisiana's 1st congressional district (2008–present)

=== Nomination vote ===
Candidate	Votes	Percent
Jim Jordan ✓	106	59.2%
Steve Scalise	73	40.8%

== Democratic nomination ==
By October 2025, New York representative Hakeem Jeffries had been anticipated to continue as the Democratic Party's leader in the United States House of Representatives. That month, Axios conducted a poll indicating that twenty candidates in the 2026 House of Representatives elections would oppose his efforts to serve as speaker or minority leader and nearly sixty were non-committal, though Jeffries received support from twenty-four candidates. Illinois representative Brad Schneider, the chair of the New Democrat Coalition, told Axios that his coalition—comprising over half of the seats in the House Democratic Caucus—would support Jeffries. The threat to Jeffries' presumed speakership in the event that Democrats win the midterm elections was intensified by mass retirements and redistricting efforts. In March 2026, Mai Vang, a member of the Sacramento City Council and a progressive challenger to California District 7 representative Doris Matsui, cited Jeffries' apparent muted response to the Iran war and electoral influence from corporations and AIPAC as reasons she would not support his leadership (Matsui would later win her reelection bid against Vang). Jeffries had been favored as Democrats' choice for speaker by August 2026, according to The Washington Post. Amidst calls from progressives for someone to challenge Jeffries in the election, a petition supporting Ayanna Pressley for speaker received over 150,000 signatures. At a town hall in East Boston, Pressley responded to calls for her to run for speaker by stating she is "very humbled to even be in the conversation," but added that she is "making no declarations or announcements here."

Jeffries was nominated by secret ballot on November 18, 2026. Eleven Democrats voted against Jeffries, with nine members-elect (Darializa Avila Chevalier, Angela Gonzales-Torres, Adam Hamawy, Frederick Haynes, Melat Kiros, Don Leonard, Donavan McKinney, Chris Rabb, and Claire Valdez) publicly announcing their opposition, although Haynes was unable to make the vote.

=== Nominee ===
- Hakeem Jeffries, House minority leader (2023–present) from New York's 8th congressional district (2013–present)

==== Nomination vote ====
Candidate	Votes	Percent
Hakeem Jeffries ✓	251	95.8%
Against	11	4.2%
Absent	2	—N/a

== See also ==
- List of Speaker of the United States House of Representatives elections
- Speaker of the United States House of Representatives
- 2026 Senate Democratic Caucus leadership election
