= Eric Jones (American politician) =

American politician

- Jones in 2026

Member-elect of the U.S. House of Representatives from California's 4th district
- Assuming office January 3, 2027
- Succeeding: Mike Thompson

Personal details
- Born: 1990 or 1991 (age 35–36) Maine, U.S.
- Party: Democratic
- Spouse: Rachel Vineberg
- Children: 2
- Education: Yale University (BA)
- Website: Campaign website

Eric Jones (born 1990/1991) is an American politician, nonprofit executive, and former venture capitalist who is the member-elect to the United States House of Representatives for California's 4th congressional district. He is a member of the Democratic Party.

== Early life, education and career ==
Jones grew up in Maine. His father was a disabled veteran. He studied finance at Yale University on a full scholarship. He moved to San Francisco after college and became a partner at Dragoneer Investment Group in California.

== Political career ==
In August 2025, Jones launched the American Dream Institute, an organization focused on outreach to young, working-class voters in support of the Democratic Party. He contributed $1 million to establish the organization and left his venture capital career to focus on its operations. The institute's advisory board included political strategist Chuck Rocha and basketball coach Steve Kerr.

== Personal life ==
Jones is married to Rachel, an architect. The couple moved from San Francisco to Sonoma in 2020. In 2021, following the birth of their son, who had a serious heart defect, they relocated to Napa for a quieter pace of life while remaining within driving distance of his medical team at the University of California, San Francisco.

Jones and his wife established the Rachel and Eric Jones Foundation to support initiatives in health care, education, and the arts.

U.S. House of Representatives
Preceded by Mike Thompson	Member of the U.S. House of Representatives from California's 4th congressional district Taking office 2027	Elect
