= Chris Gober =

American politician (born 1979/80)

Member-elect of the U.S. House of Representatives from Texas's 10th district
- Assuming office January 3, 2027
- Succeeding: Michael McCaul

Personal details
- Born: 1979 or 1980 (age 46–47)
- Party: Republican
- Education: Texas A&M University (BS); Harvard University (JD)
- Website: Campaign website

Christopher Kyle Gober (born 1979 or 1980) is an American politician from Texas. A Republican, he is the member-elect for Texas's 10th congressional district in the US House of Representatives.

== Early life and education ==
Chris Gober was born in 1979 or 1980. Gober graduated from Texas A&M University. He worked on the George W. Bush 2000 presidential campaign. He declined to work in the George W. Bush administration, enrolling at Harvard Law School, where he graduated with a Juris Doctor in 2004.

== Career ==
Gober worked for America PAC. He founded a law firm, Lex Politica, to focus on House and Senate Republicans. Gober's financial disclosures show that he has a net worth between $32 million and $107 million.

In October 2025, Gober announced his campaign for the United States House of Representatives to represent Texas's 10th congressional district in the 2026 elections. Gober won the primary election without going to a runoff and won the November general election.

U.S. House of Representatives
Preceded by Mike McCaul	Member of the U.S. House of Representatives from Texas's 10th congressional district Taking office 2027	Elect
