= Tom Sell =

American politician, attorney (born 1973)

- Sell in 2026

Member-elect of the U.S. House of Representatives from Texas's 19th district
- Assuming office January 3, 2027
- Succeeding: Jodey Arrington

Personal details
- Born: January 5, 1973 (age 53) Lubbock, Texas, U.S.
- Party: Republican
- Spouse: Kyla
- Children: 4
- Education: Texas Tech University (BS, JD)

Tom Douglas Sell (born January 5, 1973) is an American politician, businessman, and attorney from Texas. A Republican, he is the member-elect for Texas's 19th congressional district in the United States House of Representatives.

== Early life and career ==
Born in Lubbock, Texas on January 5, 1973, Sell is a fifth-generation West Texan whose family came to the Lubbock area as sharecroppers in 1906, before the city was incorporated. He earned a Bachelor of Science in agribusiness from Texas Tech University in 1995 and later received a Juris Doctor from the Texas Tech University School of Law.

After graduating from college, Sell joined the staff of U.S. Representative Larry Combest, eventually serving as deputy staff director of the United States House Committee on Agriculture while Combest chaired the committee. During his tenure, he worked on major agricultural legislation, including the Crop Insurance Reform Act of 2000 and the 2002 Farm Bill.

Following his service in Washington, Sell returned to Lubbock, where he and Combest co-founded Combest, Sell & Associates, a government affairs and consulting firm. The firm represents agricultural producers, rural communities, businesses, and other organizations throughout West Texas and across the United States. Sell has also been involved in agricultural business ventures, including Estacado Cattle Co.

== U.S. House of Representatives ==
In November 2025, Sell announced his candidacy for Texas's 19th congressional district following Representative Jodey Arrington's decision not to seek re-election. His campaign emphasized agriculture, border security, energy production, and conservative social policies.

Sell advanced to the Republican primary runoff against Abraham Enriquez after finishing first in the initial primary election. He defeated Enriquez in the runoff to secure the Republican nomination for the seat. He won the general election in November.

== Personal life ==
Sell lives in Lubbock with his wife, Kyla, whom he met while attending Texas Tech University. They have four children, and the family remains active in their church and the Texas Tech community, where they mentor students in the Davis College of Agricultural Sciences & Natural Resources.

U.S. House of Representatives
Preceded by Jodey Arrington	Member of the U.S. House of Representatives from Texas's 19th congressional district Taking office 2027	Elect
