= Joe Strada =

American politician

- Strada in 2026

Member-elect of the U.S. House of Representatives from Florida's 11th district
- Assuming office January 3, 2027
- Succeeding: Daniel Webster

Personal details
- Born: January 8, 1963 (age 63) Chicago, Illinois, U.S.
- Party: Republican
- Website: Campaign website

Joseph Horatio Strada Jr. (born January 8, 1963) is an American politician and businessman. He is the representative-elect for Florida's 11th congressional district and is a member of the Republican Party.

== Early life ==
Strada was born on January 8, 1963, in Chicago, Illinois. One of six children, he grew up in Chicago before his family moved to Longwood, Florida, when he was 12. He graduated from Lyman High School in Florida. While in high school, he helped run a bowling alley. Strada did not attend college. He bought a donut shop at age 19, later worked as a salesman for a HVAC company in Florida. In 2003, Strada established Strada Services, which has become "the largest privately held and family-owned air conditioning, electric, security and plumbing company in the country". According to Forbes, his business had revenue of $534 million in 2025, while Strada's net worth is estimated at $800 million.

== U.S. House of Representatives ==
=== Elections ===
==== 2026 ====
In June 2026, Strada launched his campaign for Florida's 11th congressional district as a member of the Republican Party, seeking to succeed the retiring Daniel Webster. He won the Republican primary and faced Democratic candidate James Pericola in the general election. He won in the general election.

U.S. House of Representatives
| Preceded by Daniel Webster | Member of the U.S. House of Representatives from Florida's 11th congressional district Taking office 2027 | Elect |
