= 2026 United States House of Representatives elections in New Jersey =

- November 3, 2026

All 12 New Jersey seats to the United States House of Representatives
- Turnout: 43.72%(▼20.95pp)
| | Majority party | Minority party |
|---|---|---|
| Party | Democratic | Republican |
| Last election | 9 | 3 |
| Seats won | 11 | 1 |
| Seat change | ▲2 | ▼2 |
| Popular vote | 1,902,260 | 976,520 |
| Percentage | 65.06% | 33.4% |
| Swing | ▲12.6% | ▼11.9% |

Democratic hold Democratic gain
Republican hold
Democratic
40–50%
50–60%
60–70%
70–80%
80–90%
Republican
40–50%
50–60%
60–70%

The 2026 United States House of Representatives elections in New Jersey were held on November 3, 2026, to elect the 12 U.S. representatives from the state of New Jersey, one from all 12 of the state's congressional districts. The elections coincided with national elections to the House of Representatives, elections to the United States Senate, and various state and local elections. The primary elections took place on June 2, 2026.

Democrats won the largest House majority in the state's congressional delegation since 2018 and the largest recorded popular vote percentage. They flipped two of three Republican-held districts in the state, defeating Jeff Van Drew of the 2nd district and Tom Kean, Jr. of the 7th, but not Chris Smith of the 4th.

== District 1 ==
2026 New Jersey's 1st congressional district election
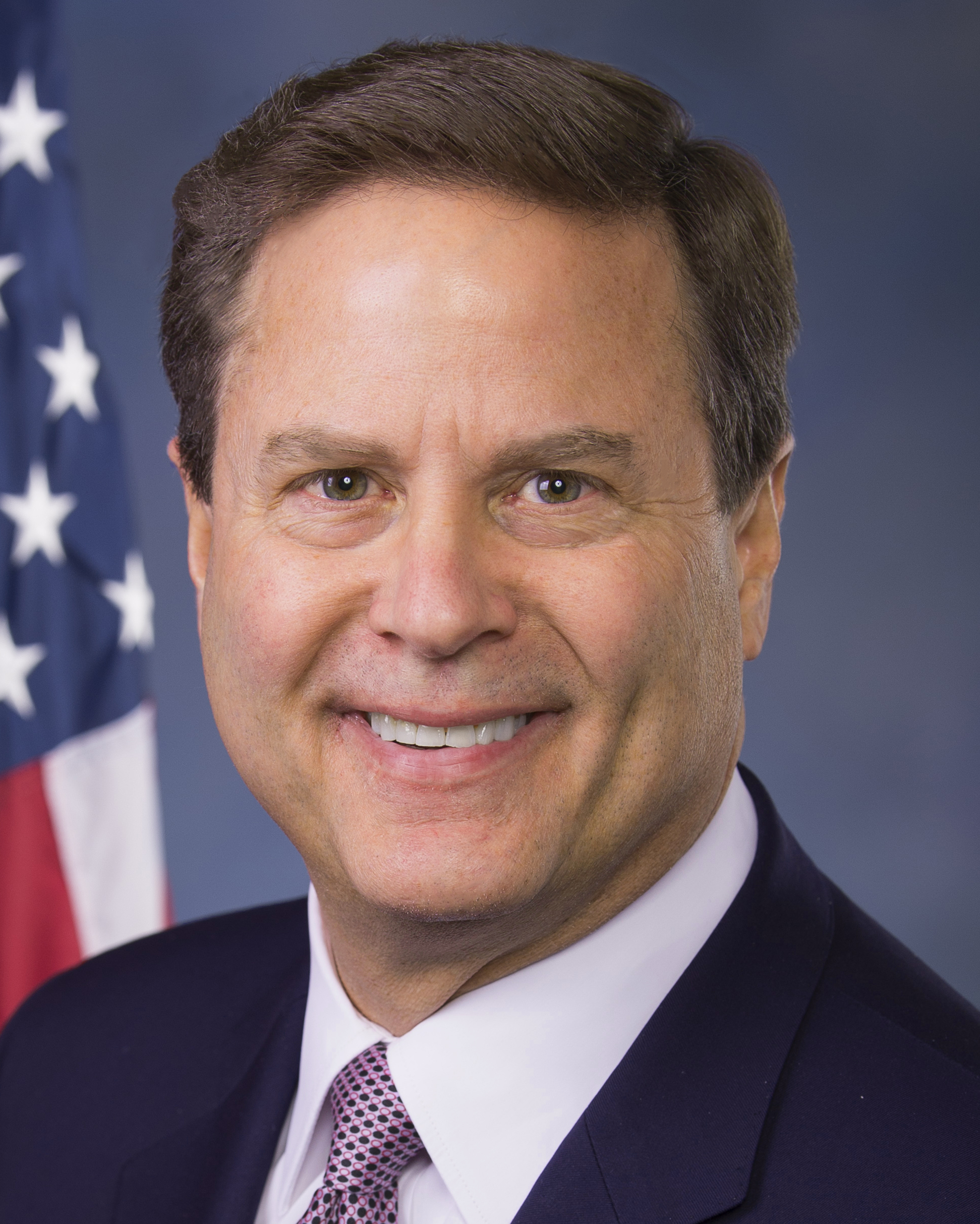

| Nominee | Donald Norcross | Damon Galdo |
| Party | Democratic | Republican |
| Popular vote | 181,836 | 76,463 |
| Percentage | 70.40% | 29.60% |
- Norcross: 50–60% 60–70% 70–80% 80–90% >90%
U.S. Representative before election
Donald Norcross
Democratic
Elected U.S. Representative
Donald Norcross
Democratic

The 1st district consists of the South Jersey suburbs of Philadelphia, including the municipalities of Camden and Cherry Hill. The incumbent is Democrat Donald Norcross, who was re-elected with 57.8% of the vote in 2024.

=== Democratic primary ===
==== Nominee ====
- Donald Norcross, incumbent U.S. representative

==== Withdrawn ====
- Lonnie Affrime, cannabis dispensary owner

==== Endorsements ====
Donald Norcross

Statewide officials

- Mikie Sherrill, governor of New Jersey (2026–present)

Political parties

- Gloucester County Democratic Committee

Labor unions

- 32BJ SEIU
- American Federation of Government Employees
- Communications Workers of America District 1
- Hotel and Gaming Trades Council
- National Education Association
- SEIU New Jersey State Council

Organizations

- AIPAC
- Democratic Majority for Israel
- Gun Sense Voter
- League of Conservation Voters
- Planned Parenthood Action Fund
- Reproductive Freedom for All

==== Fundraising ====
Campaign finance reports as of May 13, 2026
| Candidate | Raised | Spent | Cash on hand |
|---|---|---|---|
| Donald Norcross (D) | $1,433,558 | $965,685 | $2,175,361 |
Source: Federal Election Commission

==== Results ====
Democratic primary results
| Party | Candidate | Votes | % |
|---|---|---|---|
| Democratic | Donald Norcross (incumbent) | 66,059 | 100.0 |
| Total votes | | 66,059 | 100.0 |

=== Republican primary ===
==== Nominee ====
- Damon Galdo, construction worker and candidate for this district in 2022 and 2024

==== Endorsements ====
Damon Galdo

Political parties

- Gloucester County Republican Organization

==== Fundraising ====
Campaign finance reports as of May 13, 2026
| Candidate | Raised | Spent | Cash on hand |
|---|---|---|---|
| Damon Galdo (R) | $4,256 | $1,062 | $3,262 |
Source: Federal Election Commission

==== Results ====
Republican primary results
| Party | Candidate | Votes | % |
|---|---|---|---|
| Republican | Damon Galdo | 16,265 | 100.0 |
| Total votes | | 16,265 | 100.0 |

=== Third party and independent candidates ===
==== Withdrawn ====
- Austin Johnson (For the People), janitor and independent candidate for this seat in 2024

=== General election ===
==== Post-primary endorsements ====
Donald Norcross (D)

Labor unions

- AFL-CIO
- American Federation of Government Employees
- New Jersey State Building & Construction Trades Council
- New Jersey Teamsters
- United Auto Workers

Organizations

- National Troopers Coalition
- New Jersey Sierra Club

==== Predictions ====
| Source | Ranking | As of |
|---|---|---|
| Decision Desk HQ | Safe D | July 14, 2026 |
| The Cook Political Report | Solid D | August 13, 2025 |
| Inside Elections | Solid D | March 7, 2025 |
| Sabato's Crystal Ball | Safe D | April 10, 2025 |
| Silver Bulletin | Solid D | August 23, 2026 |

==== Fundraising ====
Campaign finance reports as of September 30, 2026
| Candidate | Raised | Spent | Cash on hand |
|---|---|---|---|
| Donald Norcross (D) | $1,872,434 | $1,201,848 | $2,378,074 |
| Damon Galdo (R) | $15,873 | $13,920 | $2,021 |
Source: Federal Election Commission

==== Results ====
2026 New Jersey's 1st congressional district election
| Party | Candidate | Votes | % | ±% |
|---|---|---|---|---|
| Democratic | Donald Norcross (incumbent) | | | |
| Republican | Damon Galdo | | | |
| Total votes | | | | |

== District 2 ==
2026 New Jersey's 2nd congressional district election

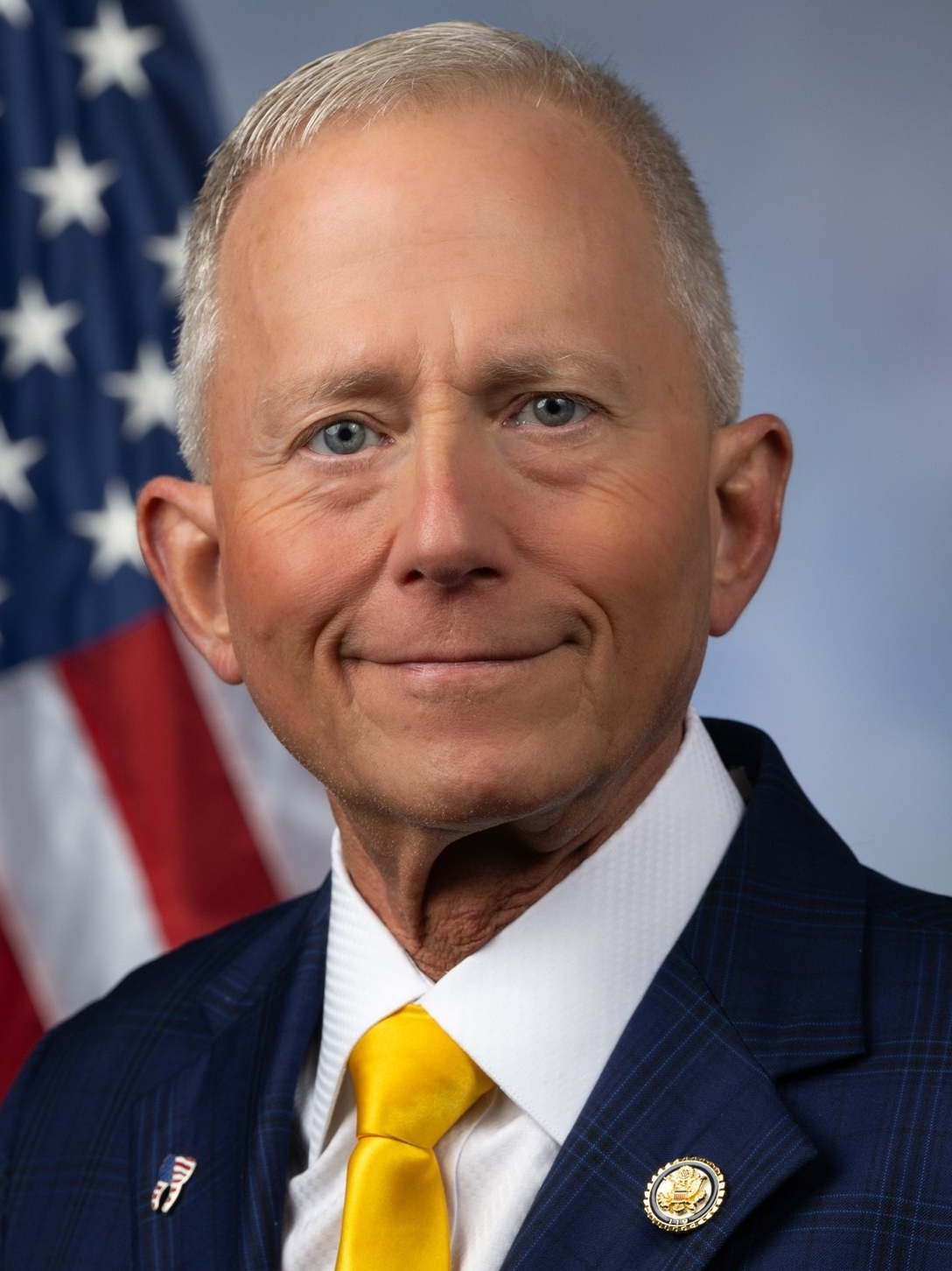
| Nominee | Zack Mullock | Jeff Van Drew |
| Party | Democratic | Republican |
| Popular vote | 138,683 | 131,086 |
| Percentage | 50.87% | 48.08% |
- Mullock: 50–60% 60–70% 70–80% 80–90% Van Drew: 50–60% 60–70% 70–80% Tie: 40–50%
U.S. Representative before election
Jeff Van Drew
Republican
Elected U.S. Representative
Zack Mullock
Democratic

The 2nd district covers the majority of South Jersey, taking in Atlantic City, Vineland, the Pine Barrens, and parts of the Philadelphia metropolitan area. It also stretches into southern Ocean County, taking in Long Beach Island, Little Egg Harbor, and parts of Berkeley. The incumbent is Republican Jeff Van Drew, who was re-elected with 58.1% of the vote in 2024.

=== Republican primary ===
==== Nominee ====
- Jeff Van Drew, incumbent U.S. representative

==== Endorsements ====
Jeff Van Drew

Executive branch officials

- Donald Trump, president of the United States (2017–2021, 2025–present)

Political parties

- Cumberland County Republican Organization
- Gloucester County Republican Organization
- Salem County Republican Organization

==== Fundraising ====
Campaign finance reports as of May 13, 2026
| Candidate | Raised | Spent | Cash on hand |
|---|---|---|---|
| Jeff Van Drew (R) | $1,701,892 | $1,071,272 | $1,393,050 |
Source: Federal Election Commission

==== Results ====
Republican primary results
| Party | Candidate | Votes | % |
|---|---|---|---|
| Republican | Jeff Van Drew (incumbent) | 35,602 | 100.0 |
| Total votes | | 35,602 | 100.0 |

=== Democratic primary ===
==== Nominee ====
- Zack Mullock, mayor of Cape May (2021–present)

==== Eliminated in primary ====
- Tim Alexander, civil rights attorney, nominee for this district in 2022 and candidate in 2024
- Terri Reese, former retail store manager
- Bayly Winder, former advisor to the chief operating offer of USAID

==== Withdrawn ====
- Bill Finn, teacher

==== Endorsements ====
Tim Alexander

Labor unions

- UNITE HERE Local 54

Political parties

- Atlantic County Democratic Committee
- Cumberland County Democratic Committee
- Ocean County Democratic Committee
- Salem County Democratic Committee

Organizations

- Gun Sense Voter (co-endorsement with Reese and Winder)
Zack Mullock

State legislators

- James Beach, SD-06 (2009–present)
- Vince Mazzeo, former AD-02 (2014–2022)
- Maureen Rowan, AD-02 (2026–present)

Individuals

- Amy Kennedy, mental health advocate and nominee for this seat in 2020

Political parties

- Cape May County Democratic Committee
Terri Reese

Organizations

- Gun Sense Voter (co-endorsement with Alexander and Winder)
Bayly Winder

Executive branch officials

- Samantha Power, former administrator of the United States agency for international development (2021–2025)

Statewide officials

- Douglas Fisher, former New Jersey secretary of agriculture (2009–2023)

State legislators

- Edward Salmon, former AD-01 (1988–1991)

Organizations

- Gun Sense Voter (co-endorsement with Alexander and Reese)
- New Jersey Citizen Action PAC
Declined to endorse

Political parties

- Gloucester County Democratic Committee

==== County convention results ====
County convention results

Atlantic County Democratic convention
| Candidate | First ballot | | Second ballot | |
| Candidate | Votes | % | Votes | % |
|---|---|---|---|---|
| Tim Alexander | 93 | 47.0% | 101 | 51.5% |
| Bayly Winder | 84 | 42.4% | 95 | 48.5% |
| Zack Mullock | 19 | 9.6% | Eliminated | |
| Terri Reese | 2 | 1.0% | Eliminated | |
| Total ballots | 198 ballots | | 196 ballots | |

Salem County Democratic Convention
| Party | Candidate | Votes | % |
|---|---|---|---|
| Democratic | Zack Mullock | 15 | 42.9 |
| Democratic | Tim Alexander | 18 | 51.4 |
| Democratic | Terri Reese | 1 | 2.9 |
| Democratic | Bayly Winder | 1 | 2.9 |
| Democratic | Bill Finn | 0 | 0.0 |
| Total votes | | 35 | 100.0 |

==== Fundraising ====
Campaign finance reports as of May 13, 2026
| Candidate | Raised | Spent | Cash on hand |
|---|---|---|---|
| Tim Alexander (D) | $80,691 | $73,923 | $6,768 |
| Zack Mullock (D) | $305,148 | $177,096 | $128,052 |
| Terri Reese (D) | $14,103 | $10,836 | $1,574 |
| Bayly Winder (D) | $731,388 | $585,191 | $146,196 |
Source: Federal Election Commission

==== Results ====
Democratic primary results
| Party | Candidate | Votes | % |
|---|---|---|---|
| Democratic | Zack Mullock | 17,698 | 39.8 |
| Democratic | Tim Alexander | 12,168 | 27.4 |
| Democratic | Bayly Winder | 9,846 | 22.2 |
| Democratic | Terri Reese | 4,733 | 10.6 |
| Total votes | | 44,445 | 100.0 |

=== Third party and independent candidates ===
==== Filed paperwork ====
- Ramon Mora Jr. (Independent)

=== General election ===
==== Predictions ====
| Source | Ranking | As of |
|---|---|---|
| Decision Desk HQ | Lean R | October 30, 2026 |
| The Cook Political Report | Likely R | October 30, 2026 |
| Inside Elections | Likely R | October 29, 2026 |
| Sabato's Crystal Ball | Lean R | November 2, 2026 |
| Silver Bulletin | Likely R | August 23, 2026 |

==== Post-primary endorsements ====
Zack Mullock (D)

U.S. senators

- Andy Kim, New Jersey (2024–present)

U.S. representatives

- Adam Gray, CA-13 (2025–present)
- Donald Norcross, NJ-01 (2014–present)

Statewide officials

- Mikie Sherrill, governor of New Jersey (2026–present)

Party officials

- Ken Martin, Chair of the Democratic National Committee (2025–present)

Labor unions

- International Association of Sheet Metal, Air, Rail and Transportation Workers
- New Jersey Education Association
- United Food and Commercial Workers Council of New York and New Jersey
- UNITE HERE

Organizations

- Blue Dog PAC
- New Jersey Sierra Club
- Reproductive Freedom for All

Newspapers

- The Philadelphia Inquirer
Jeff Van Drew (R)

Labor unions

- Allied Pilots Association
- New Jersey State Policemen’s Benevolent Association
- New Jersey Teamsters

Organizations

- National Federation of Independent Business
- National Troopers Coalition
- U.S. Chamber of Commerce
Declined to endorse

Labor unions

- AFL-CIO
- New Jersey State Building & Construction Trades Council

==== Fundraising ====
Campaign finance reports as of October 14, 2026
| Candidate | Raised | Spent | Cash on hand |
|---|---|---|---|
| Jeff Van Drew (R) | $2,414,607 | $2,282,246 | $894,792 |
| Zack Mullock (D) | $960,948 | $855,548 | $105,400 |
Source: Federal Election Commission

==== Polling ====
| Poll source | Date(s) administered | Sample size (Note: Key: A – all adults RV – registered voters LV – likely voters V – unclear) | Margin of error | Jeff Van Drew (R) | Zach Mullock (D) | Undecided |
|---|---|---|---|---|---|---|
| Impact Research (D) (Note: Poll sponsored by House Majority PAC, which is focused on electing Democrats to the U.S. House of Representatives) | October 7–10, 2026 | (LV) | – | 50% | 40% | 10% |

Hypothetical polling

Jeff Van Drew vs. generic Democrat

| Poll source | Date(s) administered | Sample size | Margin of error | Jeff Van Drew (R) | Generic Democrat | Undecided |
|---|---|---|---|---|---|---|
| Public Policy Polling (D) | May 21–22, 2025 | 505 (RV) | ± 4.0% | 46% | 36% | 18% |

==== Debate ====
A debate is scheduled to be held on October 22 on the campus of Stockton University, co-sponsored by the William J. Hughes Center for Public Policy and The Press of Atlantic City.

==== Results ====
2026 New Jersey's 2nd congressional district election
| Party | Candidate | Votes | % | ±% |
|---|---|---|---|---|
| Republican | Jeff Van Drew (incumbent) | 130,631 | 48.1 | −10.0 |
| Democratic | Zack Mullock | 137,999 | 50.8 | +9.7 |
| Independent | Ramon Mora Jr. | 2,836 | 1.0 | +0.3 |
| Total votes | | 271,466 | 100.00 | |

== District 3 ==
2026 New Jersey's 3rd congressional district election
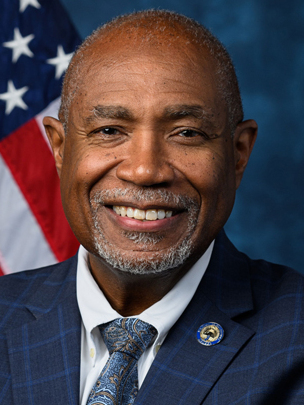

| Nominee | Herb Conaway | Michael McGuire |
| Party | Democratic | Republican |
| Popular vote | 173,644 | 97,620 |
| Percentage | 62.76% | 35.28% |
- Conaway: 40–50% 50–60% 60–70% 70–80% >90% McGuire: 40–50% 50–60% 60–70%
U.S. Representative before election
Herb Conaway
Democratic
Elected U.S. Representative
Herb Conaway
Democratic

The 3rd district is centralized around much of Burlington County, as well as parts of Mercer and Monmouth counties. The incumbent is Democrat Herb Conaway, who was elected with 53.2% of the vote in 2024.

=== Democratic primary ===
==== Nominee ====
- Herb Conaway, incumbent U.S. representative

==== Withdrawn ====
- Shawn Scott, U.S. Marine Corps veteran

==== Endorsements ====
Herb Conaway

Statewide officials

- Mikie Sherrill, governor of New Jersey (2026–present)

Political parties

- Burlington County Democratic Committee
- Monmouth County Democratic Committee

Labor unions

- 32BJ SEIU
- American Federation of Government Employees
- SEIU New Jersey State Council
- Communications Workers of America District 1

Organizations

- Gun Sense Voter
- League of Conservation Voters Action Fund
- Jewish Democratic Council of America
- Planned Parenthood Action Fund

==== Fundraising ====
Campaign finance reports as of May 13, 2026
| Candidate | Raised | Spent | Cash on hand |
|---|---|---|---|
| Herb Conaway (D) | $815,435 | $468,146 | $384,703 |
Source: Federal Election Commission

==== Results ====
Democratic primary results
| Party | Candidate | Votes | % |
|---|---|---|---|
| Democratic | Herb Conaway (incumbent) | 50,437 | 100.0 |
| Total votes | | 50,437 | 100.0 |

=== Republican primary ===
==== Nominee ====
- Michael McGuire, U.S. Marine Corps veteran

==== Eliminated in primary ====
- Justin Barbera, contractor, independent candidate for this district in 2024, and candidate for Governor of New Jersey in 2025
- Jason Cullen, sales professional, independent candidate for Governor of New Jersey in 2009, and Libertarian nominee for the 4th district in 2022

==== Withdrawn ====
- Linda McMahon, registered nurse (no relation to Education Secretary Linda McMahon)

==== Endorsements ====
Justin Barbera

State legislators

- Edward Durr, former SD-03 (2022–2024)
Jason Cullen

Political parties

- Burlington County Republican Organization
Michael McGuire

U.S. representatives

- Barry Goldwater Jr., former CA-20 (1975–1983) and son of Barry Goldwater

Political parties

- Mercer County Republican Organization
- Monmouth County Republican Organization

Organizations

- New Jersey Right to Life PAC

==== County convention results ====
County convention results

Burlington County Republican Convention
| Party | Candidate | Votes | % |
|---|---|---|---|
| Republican | Jason Cullen | 45 | 60.0 |
| Republican | Michael McGuire | 25 | 33.3 |
| Republican | Justin Barbera | 5 | 6.7 |
| Total votes | | 75 | 100.0 |

Mercer County Republican Convention
| Party | Candidate | Votes | % |
|---|---|---|---|
| Republican | Michael McGuire | 58 | 78.4 |
| Republican | Jason Cullen | 16 | 21.6 |
| Total votes | | 74 | 100.0 |

==== Fundraising ====
Campaign finance reports as of May 13, 2026
| Candidate | Raised | Spent | Cash on hand |
|---|---|---|---|
| Jason Cullen (R) | $72,488 | $67,877 | $4,611 |
| Michael McGuire (R) | $70,515 | $66,692 | $3,822 |
Source: Federal Election Commission

==== Results ====
Republican primary results
| Party | Candidate | Votes | % |
|---|---|---|---|
| Republican | Michael McGuire | 14,810 | 57.9 |
| Republican | Jason Cullen | 6,238 | 24.4 |
| Republican | Justin Barbera | 4,519 | 17.7 |
| Total votes | | 25,567 | 100.0 |

=== Third party and independent candidates ===
==== Filed paperwork ====
- Ryan Michael Kelly (Affordability, Accountability, People (Note: Not an actual political party. In New Jersey, independent candidates are allowed to choose a ballot label)), public servant
- Steven Welzer (Green Party), journalist and nominee for LD-14 in 2025

=== General election ===
==== Post-primary endorsements ====
Herb Conaway (D)

Labor unions

- AFL-CIO
- American Federation of Government Employees
- New Jersey State Building & Construction Trades Council
- New Jersey Teamsters

Organizations

- Giffords
- National Troopers Coalition
- New Jersey Sierra Club
Michael McGuire (R)

Labor unions

- New Jersey State Policemen’s Benevolent Association

==== Predictions ====
| Source | Ranking | As of |
|---|---|---|
| Decision Desk HQ | Safe D | July 14, 2026 |
| The Cook Political Report | Solid D | August 13, 2025 |
| Inside Elections | Solid D | March 7, 2025 |
| Sabato's Crystal Ball | Safe D | April 10, 2025 |
| Silver Bulletin | Solid D | August 23, 2026 |

==== Fundraising ====
Campaign finance reports as of September 30, 2026
| Candidate | Raised | Spent | Cash on hand |
|---|---|---|---|
| Herb Conaway (D) | $1,110,764 | $687,941 | $460,237 |
| Michael McGuire (R) | $210,525 | $141,763 | $68,762 |
Source: Federal Election Commission

==== Results ====
2026 New Jersey's 3rd congressional district election
| Party | Candidate | Votes | % | ±% |
|---|---|---|---|---|
| Democratic | Herb Conaway (incumbent) | | | |
| Republican | Michael McGuire | | | |
| Affordability, Accountability, People | Ryan Michael Kelly | | | |
| Green | Steven Welzer | | | |
| Total votes | | | | |

== District 4 ==
2026 New Jersey's 4th congressional district election
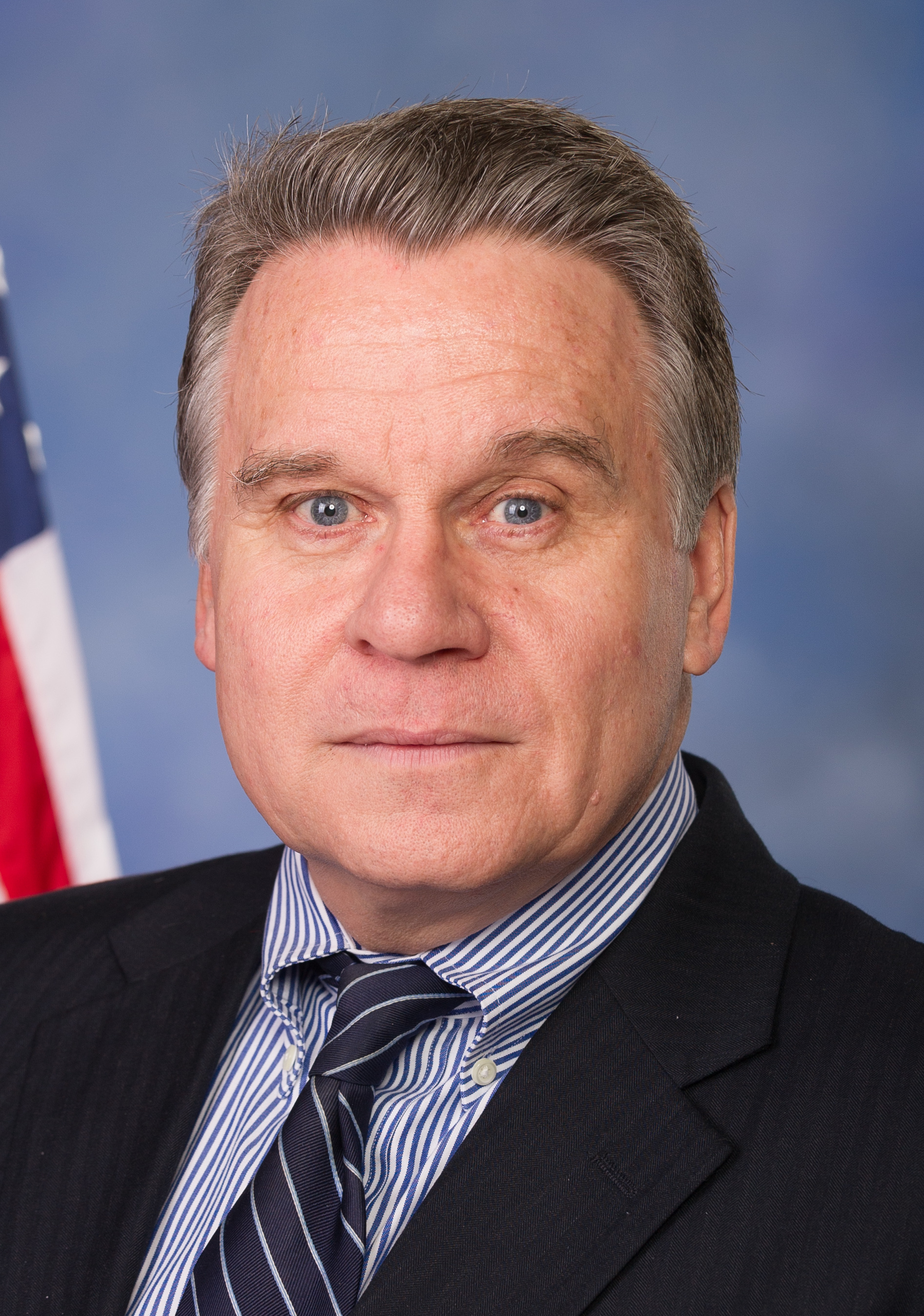

| Nominee | Chris Smith | Rachel Peace |
| Party | Republican | Democratic |
| Popular vote | 156,626 | 108,846 |
| Percentage | 59.00% | 41.00% |
- Smith: 50–60% 60–70% 80–90% Peace: 50–60% 70–80%
U.S. Representative before election
Chris Smith
Republican
Elected U.S. Representative
Chris Smith
Republican

The 4th district covers the upper Jersey Shore and expands into Monmouth and Ocean counties, taking in Lakewood Township and Toms River. The incumbent is Republican Chris Smith, who was re-elected with 67.4% of the vote in 2024.

=== Republican primary ===
==== Nominee ====
- Chris Smith, incumbent U.S. representative

==== Withdrawn ====
- Rob Canfield, real estate agent and candidate for Governor of New Jersey in 2025

==== Endorsements ====
Chris Smith

Executive branch officials

- Donald Trump, president of the United States (2017–2021, 2025–present)

Labor unions

- American Federation of Government Employees

Political parties

- Monmouth County Republican Organization

Organizations

- Americans for Tax Reform
- New Jersey Right to Life PAC

==== Fundraising ====
Campaign finance reports as of May 13, 2026
| Candidate | Raised | Spent | Cash on hand |
|---|---|---|---|
| Chris Smith (R) | $526,047 | $443,489 | $446,623 |
Source: Federal Election Commission

==== Results ====
Republican primary results
| Party | Candidate | Votes | % |
|---|---|---|---|
| Republican | Chris Smith (incumbent) | 34,110 | 100.0 |
| Total votes | | 34,110 | 100.0 |

=== Democratic primary ===
==== Nominee ====
- Rachel Peace, business owner

==== Eliminated in primary ====
- John Blake, IT professional

==== Withdrawn ====
- Keith Doll, nurse
- Bob English, activist
- Julie Flynn, Rutgers University professor (endorsed Peace)
- Peter Linardakis, Rutgers Law School student

==== Endorsements ====
Rachel Peace

Political parties

- Monmouth County Democratic Committee
- Ocean County Democratic Committee

Individuals

- Julie Flynn, Rutgers University professor and former candidate for this district

Organizations

- Gun Sense Voter

==== County convention results ====
County convention results

Monmouth County Democratic Convention
| Party | Candidate | Votes | % |
|---|---|---|---|
| Democratic | Rachel Peace | 40 | 34.5 |
| Democratic | Julie Flynn | 32 | 27.6 |
| Democratic | John Blake | 31 | 26.7 |
| Democratic | Bob English | 13 | 11.2 |
| Total votes | | 116 | 100.0 |

==== Fundraising ====
Campaign finance reports as of May 13, 2026
| Candidate | Raised | Spent | Cash on hand |
|---|---|---|---|
| John Blake (D) | $5,421 | $0 | $6,646 |
| Rachel Peace (D) | $23,573 | $17,715 | $5,858 |
Source: Federal Election Commission

==== Results ====
Democratic primary results
| Party | Candidate | Votes | % |
|---|---|---|---|
| Democratic | Rachel Peace | 20,782 | 72.8 |
| Democratic | John Blake | 7,761 | 27.2 |
| Total votes | | 28,543 | 100.0 |

=== Independents ===
==== Filed paperwork ====
- Kevin Cupples, Democratic candidate for U.S. Senate in 2024

=== General election ===
==== Predictions ====
| Source | Ranking | As of |
|---|---|---|
| Decision Desk HQ | Safe R | July 14, 2026 |
| The Cook Political Report | Solid R | August 13, 2025 |
| Inside Elections | Solid R | March 7, 2025 |
| Sabato's Crystal Ball | Safe R | April 10, 2025 |
| Silver Bulletin | Solid R | August 23, 2026 |

==== Post-primary endorsements ====
Rachel Peace (D)

U.S. senators

- Andy Kim, New Jersey (2024–present)

Organizations

- CAIR Action
Chris Smith (R)

Labor unions

- AFL-CIO
- American Federation of Government Employees
- New Jersey State Building & Construction Trades Council
- New Jersey State Policemen’s Benevolent Association
- New Jersey Teamsters

Organizations

- Lakewood Vaad
- National Federation of Independent Business
- National Troopers Coalition

==== Fundraising ====
Campaign finance reports as of October 14, 2026
| Candidate | Raised | Spent | Cash on hand |
|---|---|---|---|
| Chris Smith (R) | $797,217 | $608,265 | $553,017 |
| Rachel Peace (D) | $101,426 | $86,994 | $14,431 |
Source: Federal Election Commission

==== Results ====
2026 New Jersey's 4th congressional district election
| Party | Candidate | Votes | % | ±% |
|---|---|---|---|---|
| Republican | Chris Smith (incumbent) | | | |
| Democratic | Rachel Peace | | | |
| Total votes | | | | |

== District 5 ==
2026 New Jersey's 5th congressional district election
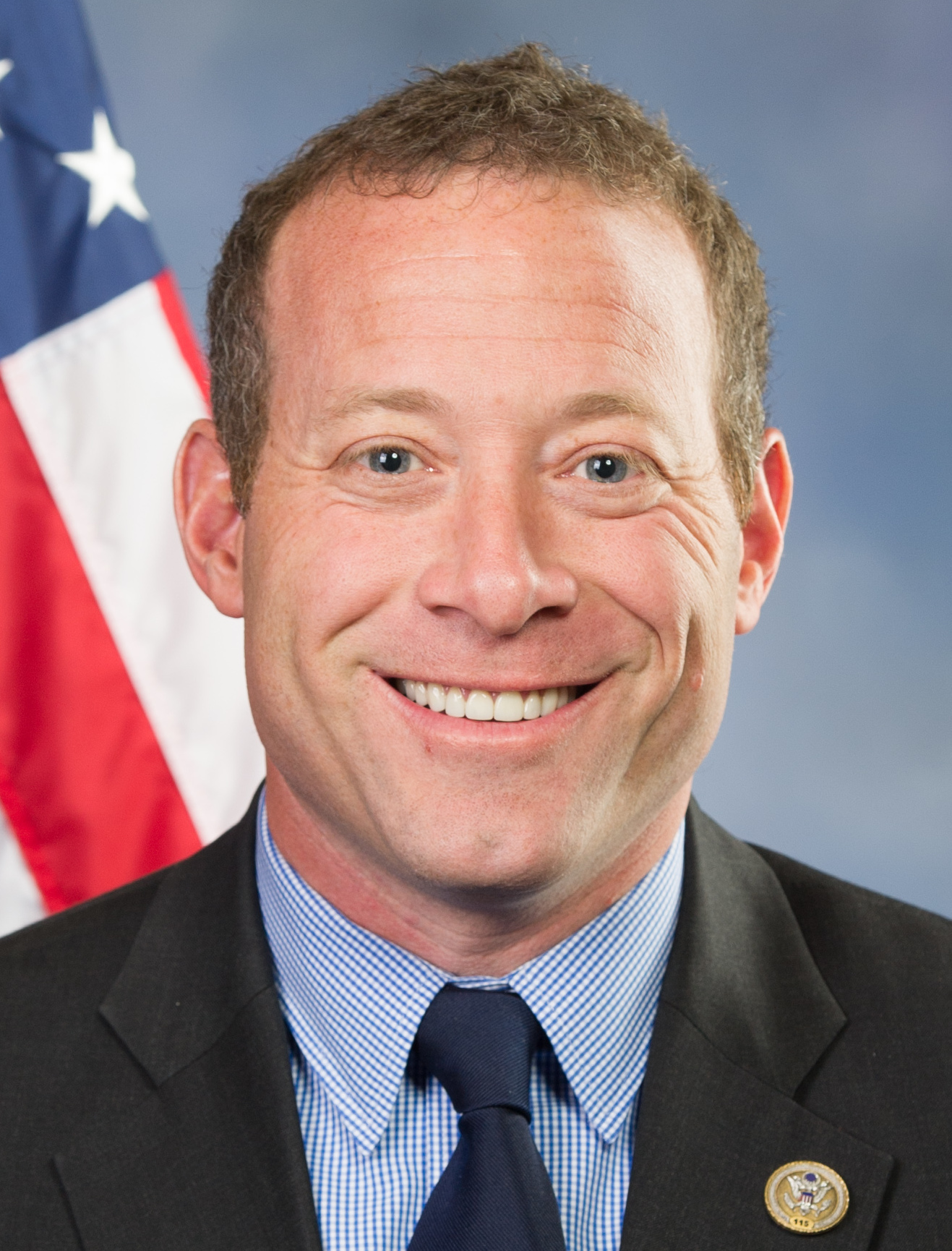

| Nominee | Josh Gottheimer | Sean Kirrane |
| Party | Democratic | Republican |
| Popular vote | 170,168 | 94,149 |
| Percentage | 62.46% | 34.56% |
- Gottheimer: 40–50% 50–60% 60–70% 70–80% 80–90% Kirrane: 40–50% 50–60% 60–70% Tie: 40–50%
U.S. Representative before election
Josh Gottheimer
Democratic
Elected U.S. Representative
Josh Gottheimer
Democratic

The 5th district stretches across the state's northern border with New York, from Sussex to Bergen counties. The incumbent is Democrat Josh Gottheimer, who was re-elected with 54.6% of the vote in 2024.

=== Democratic primary ===
==== Nominee ====
- Josh Gottheimer, incumbent U.S. representative

==== Endorsements ====
Josh Gottheimer

Statewide officials

- Mikie Sherrill, governor of New Jersey (2026–present)

Labor unions

- American Federation of Government Employees
- SEIU New Jersey State Council

Organizations

- AIPAC
- Democrats for Education Reform
- Democratic Majority for Israel
- Gun Sense Voter
- Leading the Future
- Jewish Democratic Council of America
- Joint Action Committee for Political Affairs
- Planned Parenthood Action Fund

Political parties

- Passaic County Democratic Committee

==== Fundraising ====
Campaign finance reports as of May 13, 2026
| Candidate | Raised | Spent | Cash on hand |
|---|---|---|---|
| Josh Gottheimer (D) | $3,468,842 | $12,628,177 | $11,553,157 |
Source: Federal Election Commission

==== Results ====
Democratic primary results
| Party | Candidate | Votes | % |
|---|---|---|---|
| Democratic | Josh Gottheimer (incumbent) | 38,077 | 100.0 |
| Total votes | | 38,077 | 100.0 |

=== Republican primary ===
==== Nominee ====
- Sean Kirrane, corporate consultant

==== Withdrawn ====
- John Aslanian, businessman (endorsed Kirrane)
- Sandy Gajapathy, former sales associate and candidate for this district in 2024
- Mary Jo-Ann Guinchard, former mayor of Tuxedo Park, New York and nominee for this district in 2024

==== Endorsements ====
Sean Kirrane

Political parties

- Bergen County Republican Organization
- Passaic County Republican Party

==== County convention results ====
County convention results

Bergen County Republican Convention
| Party | Candidate | Votes | % |
|---|---|---|---|
| Republican | Sean Kirrane | 155 | 85.6 |
| Republican | Sandy Gajapathy | 26 | 14.4 |
| Total votes | | 181 | 100.0 |

==== Fundraising ====
Campaign finance reports as of May 13, 2026
| Candidate | Raised | Spent | Cash on hand |
|---|---|---|---|
| Sean Kirrane (R) | $40,420 | $34,848 | $5,571 |
Source: Federal Election Commission

==== Results ====
Republican primary results
| Party | Candidate | Votes | % |
|---|---|---|---|
| Republican | Sean Kirrane | 19,529 | 100.0 |
| Total votes | | 19,529 | 100.0 |

=== Third party and independent candidates ===
==== Filed paperwork ====
- Adam Rueda (Humane Sustainable Future), DJ

=== General election ===
==== Predictions ====
| Source | Ranking | As of |
|---|---|---|
| Decision Desk HQ | Safe D | September 8, 2026 |
| The Cook Political Report | Solid D | August 13, 2025 |
| Inside Elections | Solid D | March 7, 2025 |
| Sabato's Crystal Ball | Safe D | March 26, 2026 |
| Silver Bulletin | Solid D | August 23, 2026 |

==== Post-primary endorsements ====
Josh Gottheimer (D)

Labor unions

- AFL-CIO
- American Federation of Government Employees
- New Jersey State Building & Construction Trades Council
- New Jersey State Policemen’s Benevolent Association
- New Jersey Teamsters

Organizations

- Fairshake
- National Troopers Coalition
Adam Rueda (I)

Organizations

- CAIR Action

==== Fundraising ====
Campaign finance reports as of October 14, 2026
| Candidate | Raised | Spent | Cash on hand |
|---|---|---|---|
| Josh Gottheimer (D) | $5,788,812 | $12,970,258 | $13,531,047 |
| Sean Kirrane (R) | $103,742 | $103,546 | $196 |
Source: Federal Election Commission

==== Results ====
2026 New Jersey's 5th congressional district election
| Party | Candidate | Votes | % | ±% |
|---|---|---|---|---|
| Democratic | Josh Gottheimer (incumbent) | | | |
| Republican | Sean Kirrane | | | |
| Humane Sustainable Future | Adam Rueda | | | |
| Total votes | | | | |

== District 6 ==
2026 New Jersey's 6th congressional district election
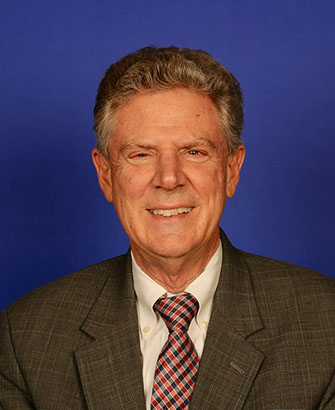

| Nominee | Frank Pallone | Hillary Herzig |
| Party | Democratic | Republican |
| Popular vote | 148,007 | 65,188 |
| Percentage | 69.42% | 30.58% |
- Pallone: 50–60% 60–70% 70–80% 80–90% Herzig: 50–60% Tie: 50%
U.S. Representative before election
Frank Pallone
Democratic
Elected U.S. Representative
Frank Pallone
Democratic

The 6th district takes in towns along the Raritan Bay, including Edison and Woodbridge, while also stretching into coastal Monmouth County. The incumbent is Democrat Frank Pallone, who was re-elected with 56.1% of the vote in 2024.

=== Democratic primary ===
==== Nominee ====
- Frank Pallone, incumbent U.S. representative

==== Eliminated in primary ====
- Katie Bansil, investment analyst
- John Hsu, software engineer and candidate for this district in 2020 and 2024

==== Endorsements ====
Katie Bansil

Organizations

- Gen-Z for Change
- Progressive Victory
- Track AIPAC (co-endorsement with Hsu)
John Hsu

Organizations

- Council on American–Islamic Relations Action
- Emgage Action
- Our Revolution New Jersey
- Track AIPAC (co-endorsement with Bansil)
Frank Pallone

Statewide officials

- Mikie Sherrill, governor of New Jersey (2026–present)

Political parties

- Middlesex County Democratic Organization
- Monmouth County Democratic Committee

Labor unions

- 32BJ SEIU
- American Federation of Government Employees
- SEIU New Jersey State Council
- Communications Workers of America District 1
- National Education Association

Organizations

- AIPAC
- Democratic Majority for Israel
- Planned Parenthood Action Fund

==== Fundraising ====
Campaign finance reports as of May 13, 2026
| Candidate | Raised | Spent | Cash on hand |
|---|---|---|---|
| Katie Bansil (D) | $41,549 | $39,293 | $3,909 |
| John Hsu (D) | $104,258 | $54,924 | $49,408 |
| Frank Pallone (D) | $2,031,593 | $1,755,602 | $3,347,900 |
Source: Federal Election Commission

==== Results ====
Democratic primary results
| Party | Candidate | Votes | % |
|---|---|---|---|
| Democratic | Frank Pallone (incumbent) | 32,761 | 65.7 |
| Democratic | John Hsu | 13,304 | 26.7 |
| Democratic | Katie Bansil | 3,837 | 7.7 |
| Total votes | | 49,902 | 100.0 |

=== Republican primary ===
==== Nominee ====
- Hillary Herzig, civil servant

==== Endorsements ====
Hillary Herzig

Political parties

- Middlesex County Republican Organization
- Monmouth County Republican Organization

Organizations

- New Jersey Right to Life PAC

==== Fundraising ====
Campaign finance reports as of May 13, 2026
| Candidate | Raised | Spent | Cash on hand |
|---|---|---|---|
| Hillary Herzig (R) | $4,982 | $3,286 | $1,696 |
Source: Federal Election Commission

==== Results ====
Republican primary results
| Party | Candidate | Votes | % |
|---|---|---|---|
| Republican | Hillary Herzig | 13,055 | 100.0 |
| Total votes | | 13,055 | 100.0 |

=== Third-party and Independent candidates ===
==== Filed paperwork ====
- Sidney Johnson

==== Withdrawn ====
- Inder Jit Soni (NJ Families First), international banker

=== General election ===
==== Post-primary endorsements ====
Frank Pallone (D)

Labor unions

- AFL-CIO
- American Federation of Government Employees
- New Jersey State Building & Construction Trades Council
- New Jersey State Policemen’s Benevolent Association
- New Jersey Teamsters

Organizations

- National Troopers Coalition
- New Jersey Sierra Club

==== Predictions ====
| Source | Ranking | As of |
|---|---|---|
| Decision Desk HQ | Safe D | July 14, 2026 |
| The Cook Political Report | Solid D | August 13, 2025 |
| Inside Elections | Solid D | March 7, 2025 |
| Sabato's Crystal Ball | Safe D | April 10, 2025 |
| Silver Bulletin | Solid D | August 23, 2026 |

==== Fundraising ====
Campaign finance reports as of September 30, 2026
| Candidate | Raised | Spent | Cash on hand |
|---|---|---|---|
| Frank Pallone (D) | $2,743,879 | $2,667,626 | $3,148,164 |
| Hillary Herzig (R) | $11,006 | $10,063 | $943 |
Source: Federal Election Commission

==== Results ====
2026 New Jersey's 6th congressional district election
| Party | Candidate | Votes | % | ±% |
|---|---|---|---|---|
| Democratic | Frank Pallone (incumbent) | | | |
| Republican | Hillary Herzig | | | |
| Total votes | | | | |

== District 7 ==
2026 New Jersey's 7th congressional district election

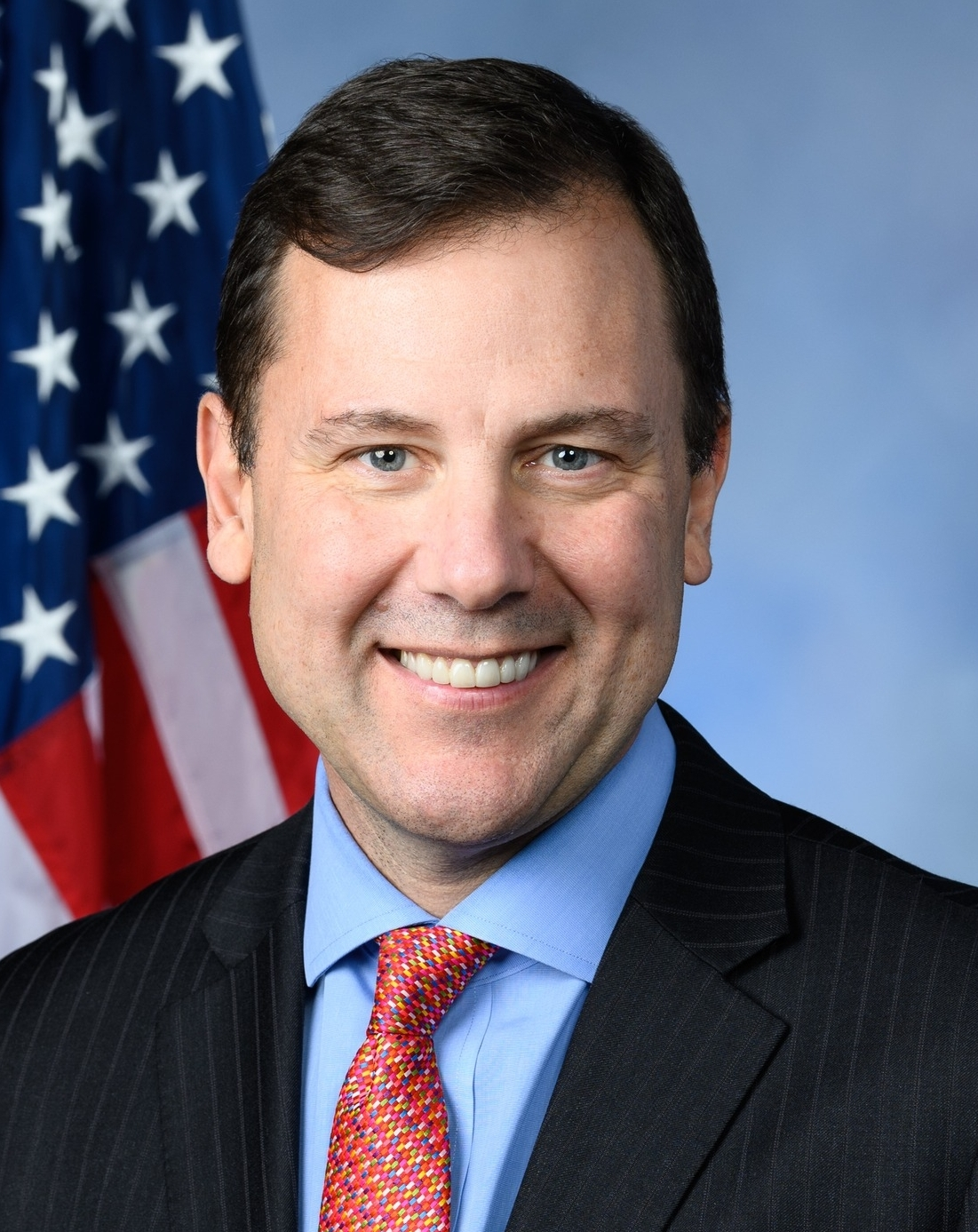
| Nominee | Rebecca Bennett | Thomas Kean Jr. |
| Party | Democratic | Republican |
| Popular vote | 193,473 | 137,562 |
| Percentage | 57.54% | 40.91% |
- Bennett: 40–50% 50–60% 60–70% 70–80% 80–90% Kean: 40–50% 50–60% >90% No data
U.S. Representative before election
Thomas Kean Jr.
Republican
Elected U.S. Representative
Rebecca Bennett
Democratic

The 7th district is one of the wealthiest districts in the U.S., encompassing the New Jersey Highlands of Hunterdon and Warren counties. The incumbent is Republican Thomas Kean Jr., who was re-elected with 51.7% of the vote in 2024. Kean's previous 117-day absence from Congress due to his disclosed depression diagnosis became an issue in the campaign. Kean has continued his re-election campaign upon his return.

=== Republican primary ===
==== Nominee ====
- Thomas Kean Jr., incumbent U.S. representative

==== Endorsements ====
Tom Kean Jr.

Executive branch officials

- Donald Trump, president of the United States (2017–2021, 2025–present)

U.S. representatives

- Mike Johnson, speaker of the House (2023–present) from LA-04 (2017–present)

Statewide officials

- Chris Christie, former governor of New Jersey (2010–2018)

Organizations

- Americans for Tax Reform
- Log Cabin Republicans
- National Republican Congressional Committee
- Republican Jewish Coalition

Political parties

- Hunterdon County Republican Organization

==== Fundraising ====
Campaign finance reports as of May 13, 2026
| Candidate | Raised | Spent | Cash on hand |
|---|---|---|---|
| Tom Kean Jr. (R) | $4,542,249 | $1,199,845 | $3,390,690 |
Source: Federal Election Commission

==== Results ====
Republican primary results
| Party | Candidate | Votes | % |
|---|---|---|---|
| Republican | Thomas Kean Jr. (incumbent) | 35,080 | 100.0 |
| Total votes | | 35,080 | 100.0 |

=== Democratic primary ===
==== Nominee ====
- Rebecca Bennett, healthcare executive and former United States Navy aviator

==== Eliminated in primary ====
- Michael Roth, former chief of staff for the Small Business Administration
- Tina Shah, former senior advisor to the U.S. Surgeon General
- Brian Varela, former chair of the New Jersey Forward Party and candidate for the 8th district in 2022

==== Withdrawn ====
- Beth Adubato, professor and daughter of former basketball coach Richie Adubato
- Vale Mendoza, attorney
- Megan O'Rourke, former climate change advisor at the U.S. Department of Agriculture (endorsed Bennett)
- Sara Sooy, Somerset County commissioner (endorsed Bennett)
- Greg Vartan, former Summit common councilmember (2019–2024) (Note: Served as council president in 2023) and candidate for this district in 2024 (endorsed Bennett)

==== Declined ====
- Tom Malinowski, former chair of the Hunterdon County Democratic Party (2024–2025) and former U.S. representative (2019–2023) (ran in the 11th district)

==== Endorsements ====
Rebecca Bennett

Executive branch officials

- Patrick Murphy, former United States Under Secretary of the Army (2016–2017)
- Maura Sullivan, former assistant to the secretary of defense for public affairs (2015)

U.S. representatives

- Jason Crow, CO-06 (2019–present)
- Chris Deluzio, PA-17 (2023–present)
- Seth Moulton, MA-06 (2015–present)
- Max Rose, former NY-11 (2019–2021)
- Pat Ryan, NY-18 (2022–present)

State legislators

- Linda S. Carter, state assemblymember from the 22nd district (2018–present)
- Joseph Cryan, state senator from the 20th district (2018–present)
- Mitchelle Drulis, state assemblymember from the 16th district (2024–present)
- James J. Kennedy, state assemblymember from the 22nd district (2016–present)
- Nicholas Scutari, president of the New Jersey Senate (2022–present) from the 22nd district (2004–present)
- Anthony Verrelli, state assemblymember from the 15th district (2018–present)

Local officials

- Jordan Glatt, former mayor of Summit (2003–2011)
- Sara Sooy, Somerset County commissioner and former candidate for this district
- 10 other mayors
- 12 county commissioners

Party officials

- 2 Democratic municipal chairs

Individuals

- Cait Conley, former senior advisor to the Cybersecurity and Infrastructure Security Agency
- JoAnna Mendoza, former veteran services representative for U.S. Representative Tom O'Halleran

Political parties

- Hunterdon County Democratic Committee
- Morris County Democratic Committee
- Somerset County Democratic Committee
- Westfield Democratic Committee
- Union County Democratic Committee

Labor unions

- Communications Workers of America District 1
- New Jersey Firefighters' Mutual Benevolent Association

Organizations

- College Democrats of New Jersey
- Gun Sense Voter (co-endorsement with Roth, Shah, and Varela)
- J Street PAC
- Serve America
- Vote Mama
- VoteVets
Michael Roth

Executive branch officials

- Don Graves, former deputy secretary of commerce (2021–2025)
- Bharat Ramamurti, former deputy director of the National Economic Council (2021–2023)

U.S. representatives

- Earl Pomeroy, former ND-AL (1993–2011)

Local officials

- Jim Johnson, former Corporation Counsel of New York City

Political parties

- Summit Democratic municipal committee

Organizations

- Gun Sense Voter (co-endorsement with Bennett, Shah, and Varela)
- 5 Indivisible chapters
- Joint Action Committee for Political Affairs
Tina Shah

U.S. representatives

- Ami Bera, CA-06 (2013–present)
- Judy Chu, CA-28 (2009–present)
- Dave Min, CA-47 (2025–present)
- Sharice Davids, KS-03 (2019–present)
- Kim Schrier, WA-08 (2019–present)
- Eric Sorensen, IL-17 (2023–present)
- Marilyn Strickland, WA-10 (2021–present)
- Suhas Subramanyam, VA-10 (2025–present)

Organizations

- 314 Action
- AAPI Victory Fund
- American College of Physicians
- American College of Obstetricians and Gynecologists
- American Federation of Government Employees Local 1012 (previously endorsed O'Rourke)
- ASPIRE PAC
- Gun Sense Voter (co-endorsement with Bennett, Roth, and Varela)
Brian Varela

Executive branch officials

- Tom Perez, former secretary of labor (2013–2017)

State legislators

- Marisa Sweeney, state assemblymember from the 25th district
- Stephen Sweeney, former president of the New Jersey Senate (2010–2022) from the 3rd district (2002–2022)

Local officials

- Ras Baraka, mayor of Newark (2014–present)

Party officials

- 12 Democratic municipal chairs
- Andrew Yang, chair of the Forward Party (2022–present) and 2020 Democratic presidential candidate

Individuals

- Patricia Campos-Medina, executive director of The Worker Institute at the New York State School of Industrial and Labor Relations at Cornell University and candidate in the 2024 United States Senate election in New Jersey

Political parties

- Forward Party
- Sussex County Democratic Committee
- Warren County Democratic Committee (previously endorsed O'Rourke)

Labor unions

- SEIU 32BJ

Organizations

- Council on American–Islamic Relations Action
- Emgage Action
- Gun Sense Voter (co-endorsement with Bennett, Roth, and Shah)
- Latino Victory Fund
- Make the Road Action NJ
- New American Leaders Action Fund
- Our Revolution New Jersey
- Peace Action
- Progressive Democrats of America
- UnidosUS Action Fund
Megan O'Rourke (withdrawn)

U.S. representatives

- Rush Holt Jr., former NJ-12 (1999–2015)
- Ro Khanna, CA-17 (2017–present)
- Chellie Pingree, ME-01 (2009–present)

Political parties

- ~~Warren County Democratic Committee~~ (switched endorsement to Varela after O'Rourke withdrew)

Labor unions

- ~~American Federation of Government Employees Local 1012~~ (switched endorsement to Shah after O'Rourke withdrew)
- American Federation of Government Employees Local 3403
- New Jersey State Council of Machinists

==== County convention results ====
County convention results

Hunterdon County Democratic convention
| Candidate | First ballot | | Second ballot | |
| Candidate | Votes | % | Votes | % |
|---|---|---|---|---|
| Rebecca Bennett | 55 | 29.4% | 94 | 55.3% |
| Brian Varela | 47 | 25.1% | 76 | 44.7% |
| Michael Roth | 42 | 22.5% | Eliminated | |
| Megan O’Rourke | 39 | 20.9% | Eliminated | |
| Tina Shah | 4 | 2.1% | Eliminated | |
| Total ballots | 187 ballots | | 170 ballots | |

Sussex County Democratic Convention
| Party | Candidate | Votes | % |
|---|---|---|---|
| Democratic | Brian Varela | 84 | 51.9 |
| Democratic | Rebecca Bennett | 53 | 32.7 |
| Democratic | Megan O’Rourke | 13 | 8.0 |
| Democratic | Michael Roth | 7 | 4.3 |
| Democratic | Tina Shah | 3 | 1.9 |
| Democratic | No Candidate | 2 | 1.2 |
| Total votes | | 162 | 100.0 |

Union County Democratic convention
| Candidate | First ballot | | Second ballot | |
| Candidate | Votes | % | Votes | % |
|---|---|---|---|---|
| Rebecca Bennett | 6 | 50.0% | 8 | 66.7% |
| Tina Shah | 4 | 33.3% | 4 | 33.3% |
| Brian Varela | 2 | 16.7% | Eliminated | |
| Beth Adubato | 0 | 0.0% | Eliminated | |
| Megan O’Rourke | 0 | 0.0% | Eliminated | |
| Michael Roth | 0 | 0.0% | Eliminated | |
| Total ballots | 12 ballots | | | |

Somerset County Democratic Convention
| Party | Candidate | Votes | % |
|---|---|---|---|
| Democratic | Rebecca Bennett | 80 | 54.1 |
| Democratic | Brian Varela | 29 | 19.6 |
| Democratic | Michael Roth | 25 | 16.9 |
| Democratic | Megan O’Rourke | 12 | 8.1 |
| Democratic | Tina Shah | 2 | 1.4 |
| Total votes | | 148 | 100.0 |

Warren County Democratic convention
| Candidate | First ballot | | Second ballot | |
| Candidate | Votes | % | Votes | % |
|---|---|---|---|---|
| Megan O’Rourke | 42 | 32.8% | 65 | 52.4% |
| Brian Varela | 38 | 29.7% | 59 | 47.6% |
| Rebecca Bennett | 31 | 24.2% | Eliminated | |
| Tina Shah | 11 | 8.6% | Eliminated | |
| Beth Adubato | 0 | 0.0% | Eliminated | |
| Michael Roth | 0 | 0.0% | Eliminated | |
| Total ballots | 128 ballots | | 124 ballots | |

Morris County Democratic convention
| Candidate | First ballot | | Second ballot | |
| Candidate | Votes | % | Votes | % |
|---|---|---|---|---|
| Rebecca Bennett | 42 | 32.8% | 65 | 52.4% |
| Michael Roth | 38 | 29.7% | 59 | 47.6% |
| Brian Varela | 31 | 24.2% | Eliminated | |
| Megan O’Rourke | 11 | 8.6% | Eliminated | |
| Tina Shah | 6 | 4.7% | Eliminated | |
| Beth Adubato | 0 | 0.0% | Eliminated | |
| Total ballots | 128 ballots | | 124 ballots | |

==== Fundraising ====
Italics indicate a withdrawn candidate.

Campaign finance reports as of May 13, 2026
| Candidate | Raised | Spent | Cash on hand |
|---|---|---|---|
| Beth Adubato (D) | $167,476 | $164,833 | $2,642 |
| Rebecca Bennett (D) | $2,944,137 | $2,180,069 | $764,068 |
| Michael Roth (D) | $1,231,819 | $546,416 | $685,402 |
| Tina Shah (D) | $2,148,461 | $1,541,109 | $607,351 |
| Sara Sooy (D) | $54,490 | $54,490 | $0 |
| Brian Varela (D) | $1,961,309 (Note: $1,150,000 of this total was self-funded by Varela.) | $1,602,817 | $358,492 |
Source: Federal Election Commission

==== Polling ====
| Poll source | Date(s) administered | Sample size | Margin of error | Rebecca Bennett | Michael Roth | Tina Shah | Brian Varela | Other | Undecided |
|---|---|---|---|---|---|---|---|---|---|
| Tavern Research | May 31 – June 1, 2026 | 479 (LV) | ± 5.4% | 32% | 12% | 16% | 15% | 1% | 24% |
| StimSight Research (Note: Poll sponsored by Insider NJ) | May 17–20, 2026 | 400 (LV) | ± 4.9% | 31% | 15% | 16% | 17% | – | 21% |
| StimSight Research | May 17–20, 2026 | 400 (LV) | ± 4.9% | 36% (Note: With voters who lean towards a given candidate) | 19% | 19% | 20% | – | 6% |
| Impact Research (D) (Note: Poll sponsored by Bennett's campaign) | May 11–13, 2026 | 400 (LV) | ± 4.9% | 36% | 13% | 15% | 12% | – | 22% |
| GQR (D) (Note: Poll sponsored by Shah's campaign) | May 3–6, 2026 | 402 (LV) | ± 4.9% | 26% | 7% | 23% | 10% | – | 34% |
| GQR (D) | February 22–25, 2026 | 403 (LV) | ± 4.9% | 10% | 3% | 8% | 4% | 5% (Note: Megan O'Rourke with 5%) | 64% |

==== Debates and forums ====
2026 NJ-7 Democratic primary debates and forums
| No. | Date | Host | Moderator | Link | Participants | | | |
| P Participant A Absent N Non-invitee I Invitee W Withdrawn | | | | | | | | |
| P Participant A Absent N Non-invitee I Invitee W Withdrawn | | | | | Bennett | Roth | Shah | Varela |
|---|---|---|---|---|---|---|---|---|
| 1 | May 11, 2026 | League of Women Voters of Somerset and Hunterdon Counties | Carol Harvey | YouTube | P | P | P | P |
| 2 | May 12, 2026 | New Jersey Globe and Rider University | David Wildstein | YouTube | P | P | P | P |
| 3 | May 30, 2026 | League of Conservation Voters | Elie Honig | YouTube | P | P | P | P |

==== Results ====
Democratic primary results
| Party | Candidate | Votes | % |
|---|---|---|---|
| Democratic | Rebecca Bennett | 27,525 | 45.3 |
| Democratic | Tina Shah | 12,146 | 20.0 |
| Democratic | Brian Varela | 11,614 | 19.1 |
| Democratic | Michael Roth | 9,452 | 15.6 |
| Total votes | | 60,737 | 100.0 |

=== Third-party and independent candidates ===
==== Filed paperwork ====
- Seamus Patrick O'Toole (Stop Israel's Genocide)

==== Removed from ballot ====
- Lana Leguía (Libertarian Party), political organizer, nominee for this district in 2024, and New Jersey's 24th assembly district in 2025

==== Withdrawn ====
- Randall Terry, author, perennial candidate, and Constitution Party nominee for president in 2024

=== General election ===
==== Predictions ====
| Source | Ranking | As of |
|---|---|---|
| The Cook Political Report | Lean D (flip) | September 25, 2026 |
| Decision Desk HQ | Likely D (flip) | September 17, 2026 |
| Inside Elections | Tilt D (flip) | June 11, 2026 |
| Sabato's Crystal Ball | Lean D (flip) | September 16, 2026 |
| Silver Bulletin | Likely D (flip) | August 23, 2026 |

==== Post-primary endorsements ====
Tom Kean Jr. (R)

Labor unions

- American Federation of Government Employees
- International Union of Operating Engineers Local 825
- New Jersey State Policemen’s Benevolent Association

Organizations

- National Federation of Independent Business
- National Troopers Coalition
- U.S. Chamber of Commerce
Rebecca Bennett (D)

Executive branch officials

- Pete Buttigieg, former secretary of transportation (2021-2025)

U.S. senators

- Cory Booker, New Jersey (2013–present)
- Andy Kim, New Jersey (2024–present)

U.S. representatives

- Gabby Giffords, former AZ-08 (2007–2012)
- Hakeem Jeffries, House minority leader (2023–present) from NY-08 (2013–present)
- Rob Menendez, NJ-08 (2023–present)
- Jamie Raskin, MD-08 (2017–present)

Statewide officials

- Mikie Sherrill, governor of New Jersey (2026–present), former NJ-11 (2019–2025)

State legislators

- Vincent Kearney, AD-21 (2026–present)

Individuals

- Michael Roth, former chief of staff for the Small Business Administration and candidate for this seat

Labor unions

- 1199SEIU United Healthcare Workers East
- AFL-CIO
- American Federation of State, County and Municipal Employees Council 63
- Communications Workers of America Local 1036
- International Association of Bridge, Structural, Ornamental and Reinforcing Iron Workers Local 11
- International Association of Sheet Metal, Air, Rail and Transportation Workers
- New Jersey Education Association
- New Jersey State Association of Pipe Trades
- New Jersey State Firefighters Mutual Benevolent Association
- SEIU 32BJ
- Workers United

Organizations

- 314 Action
- DCCC
- Democrats for Education Reform
- EMILYs List
- End Citizens United
- Giffords
- NewDem Action Fund
- New Jersey Sierra Club
- Reproductive Freedom for All

News organizations

- The Philadelphia Inquirer
- USA Today Co.
Declined to endorse

Labor unions

- New Jersey State Building & Construction Trades Council

==== Fundraising ====
Campaign finance reports as of October 14, 2026
| Candidate | Raised | Spent | Cash on hand |
|---|---|---|---|
| Thomas Kean Jr. (R) | $6,128,373 | $4,811,254 | $1,365,406 |
| Rebecca Bennett (D) | $8,757,003 | $7,703,549 | $1,053,454 |
Source: Federal Election Commission

==== Debate ====
2026 New Jersey's 7th congressional district debate
| No. | Date | Host | Moderator | Link | Republican | Democratic |
| Key: P Participant A Absent N Not invited I Invited W Withdrawn | | | | | | |
| Key: P Participant A Absent N Not invited I Invited W Withdrawn | | | | | Thomas Kean Jr. | Rebecca Bennett |
|---|---|---|---|---|---|---|
| 1 | Sep. 27, 2026 | | | | P | P |

==== Polling ====
| Poll source | Date(s) administered | Sample size | Margin of error | Tom Kean Jr. (R) | Rebecca Bennett (D) | Other | Undecided |
|---|---|---|---|---|---|---|---|
| StimSight Research (Note: Poll sponsored by InsiderNJ) | September 8–12, 2026 | 498 (LV) | ± 4.7% | 42% | 47% (Note: Including voters who lean towards a given candidate) | 1% (Note: Seamus O'Toole (I) with 1%) | 10% |
| Z to A Research (Note: Poll sponsored by 314 Action, which supports Shah) | May 24–26, 2026 | 430 (LV) | ± 4.7% | 43% | 47% | – | 10% |

Hypothetical polling

Tom Kean Jr. vs. Tina Shah

| Poll source | Date(s) administered | Sample size | Margin of error | Tom Kean Jr. (R) | Tina Shah (D) | Undecided |
|---|---|---|---|---|---|---|
| Z to A Research | May 24–26, 2026 | 430 (LV) | ± 4.7% | 43% | 46% | 11% |

==== Results ====
2026 New Jersey's 7th congressional district election
| Party | Candidate | Votes | % | ±% |
|---|---|---|---|---|
| Democratic | Rebecca Bennett | 193,473 | 57.54 | |
| Republican | Thomas Kean Jr. (incumbent) | 137,562 | 40.91 | |
| Stop Israel's Genocide | Seamus Patrick O'Toole | 5,228 | 1.55 | |
| Total votes | | 336,263 | 100.0 | |

== District 8 ==
2026 New Jersey's 8th congressional district election
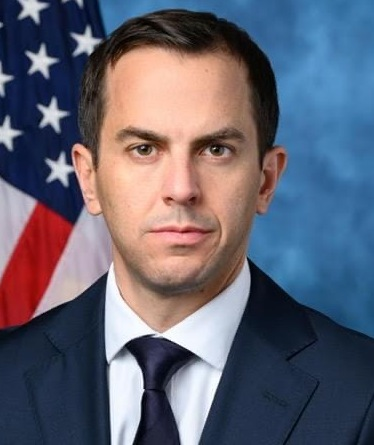

| Nominee | Rob Menendez | Craig Honts |
| Party | Democratic | Socialist Workers |
| Popular vote | 112,079 | 5,406 |
| Percentage | 88.57% | 4.27% |
- Menendez: 80–90% >90%
U.S. Representative before election
Rob Menendez
Democratic
Elected U.S. Representative
Rob Menendez
Democratic

The 8th district is majority Hispanic and contains the urban areas of Elizabeth, Hoboken, and Union City, as well as parts of Newark and Jersey City. The incumbent is Democrat Rob Menendez, who was re-elected with 59.2% of the vote in 2024.

=== Democratic primary ===
==== Nominee ====
- Rob Menendez, incumbent U.S. representative

==== Eliminated in primary ====
- Mussab Ali, former president of the Jersey City Board of Education (2021–2022) at-large (2018–2022) and candidate for mayor of Jersey City in 2025

==== Endorsements ====
Mussab Ali

U.S. representatives

- Jamaal Bowman, former NY-16 (2021–2025)

Organizations

- Emgage Action
- Peace Action
- Progressive Change Campaign Committee
- Progressive Democrats of America
- Track AIPAC
Rob Menendez

U.S. senators

- Andy Kim, New Jersey (2024–present)

U.S. representatives

- Linda Sánchez, CA-38 (2003–present)
- LaMonica McIver, NJ-10 (2024–present)
- Bonnie Watson Coleman, NJ-12 (2015–present)

Statewide officials

- Mikie Sherrill, governor of New Jersey (2026–present)

State legislators

- Brian Stack, state senator from the 33rd district (2008–present) and mayor of Union City (2000–present)
- Larry Wainstein, state assemblymember from the 33rd district (2025–present)

Local officials

- Albio Sires, mayor of West New York (1995–2006, 2023–present)
- Ras Baraka, mayor of Newark (2014–present)
- Emily Jabbour, mayor of Hoboken (2026–present)
- 5 other mayors

Political parties

- Essex County Democratic Committee
- Hudson County Democratic Organization
- Union County Democratic Committee

Labor unions

- 32BJ SEIU
- American Federation of Government Employees
- Communications Workers of America District 1
- Hotel and Gaming Trades Council
- LiUNA
- National Education Association
- SEIU New Jersey State Council
- Eastern Atlantic States Regional Council of Carpenters

Organizations

- AIPAC
- BOLD PAC
- Democratic Majority for Israel
- Gun Sense Voter
- Jewish Democratic Council of America
- Latino Victory Fund
- Leading the Future
- Make the Road Action NJ
- Planned Parenthood Action Fund

==== Fundraising ====
Campaign finance reports as of May 13, 2026
| Candidate | Raised | Spent | Cash on hand |
|---|---|---|---|
| Mussab Ali (D) | $226,776 | $186,914 | $39,861 |
| Rob Menendez (D) | $1,550,177 | $1,078,528 | $748,335 |
Source: Federal Election Commission

==== Polling ====
| Poll source | Date(s) administered | Sample size | Margin of error | Mussab Ali | Rob Menendez | Undecided |
|---|---|---|---|---|---|---|
| Center for Strategic Politics (D) (Note: Poll sponsored by Ali's campaign) | April 11–16, 2026 | 411 (LV) | ± 4.8% | 27% | 42% | 31% |

==== Results ====
2026 Democratic primary results by precinct: Menendez: 40–50%; 50–60%; 60–70%; 70–80%; 80–90%; 90–100%; Ali: 50–60%; 60–70%; 80–90%; Ties: 40–50%; 50%

Democratic primary results
| Party | Candidate | Votes | % |
|---|---|---|---|
| Democratic | Rob Menendez (incumbent) | 28,509 | 68.8 |
| Democratic | Mussab Ali | 12,930 | 31.2 |
| Total votes | | 41,439 | 100.0 |

=== Republican primary ===
No candidates successfully submitted paperwork by March 23, 2026 to appear on the ballot for the Republican primary.

=== Third-party and Independent candidates ===
==== Declared ====
- Aristotle Eliopoulos (Independent), teacher
- Craig Honts (Socialist Workers Party), nominee for Lieutenant Governor of New Jersey in 2025
- Da’Shone Hughey (We The People)

==== Withdrawn ====
- Richard Barilla (Independent), teacher

==== Endorsements ====
Aristotle Eliopoulos

Party officials

- 3 Republican county chairs
Richard Barilla (withdrawn)

Political parties

- Forward Party

==== Fundraising ====
Italics indicate a withdrawn candidate.

Campaign finance reports as of April 14, 2026
| Candidate | Raised | Spent | Cash on hand |
|---|---|---|---|
| Richard Barilla (I) | $5,600 | $3,748 | $1,851 |
Source: Federal Election Commission

=== General election ===
==== Post-primary endorsements ====
Rob Menendez (D)

Labor unions

- AFL-CIO
- American Federation of Government Employees
- New Jersey State Building & Construction Trades Council
- New Jersey Teamsters

Organizations

- National Troopers Coalition
- New Jersey Sierra Club

==== Predictions ====
| Source | Ranking | As of |
|---|---|---|
| Decision Desk HQ | Safe D | July 14, 2026 |
| The Cook Political Report | Solid D | August 13, 2025 |
| Inside Elections | Solid D | March 7, 2025 |
| Sabato's Crystal Ball | Safe D | April 10, 2025 |
| Silver Bulletin | Solid D | August 23, 2026 |

==== Fundraising ====
Campaign finance reports as of September 30, 2026
| Candidate | Raised | Spent | Cash on hand |
|---|---|---|---|
| Rob Menendez (D) | $2,161,300 | $1,775,657 | $662,328 |
Source: Federal Election Commission

==== Results ====
2026 New Jersey's 8th congressional district election
| Party | Candidate | Votes | % | ±% |
|---|---|---|---|---|
| Democratic | Rob Menendez (incumbent) | 112,079 | 88.57% | +29.37 |
| Socialist Workers | Craig Honts | 5,406 | 4.27% | +3.07 |
| Independent | Aristotle Eliopoulos | 5,350 | 4.23% | N/A |
| We The People | Da’Shone Hughey | 3,708 | 2.93% | N/A |
| Total votes | | | 100 | |

== District 9 ==
2026 New Jersey's 9th congressional district election
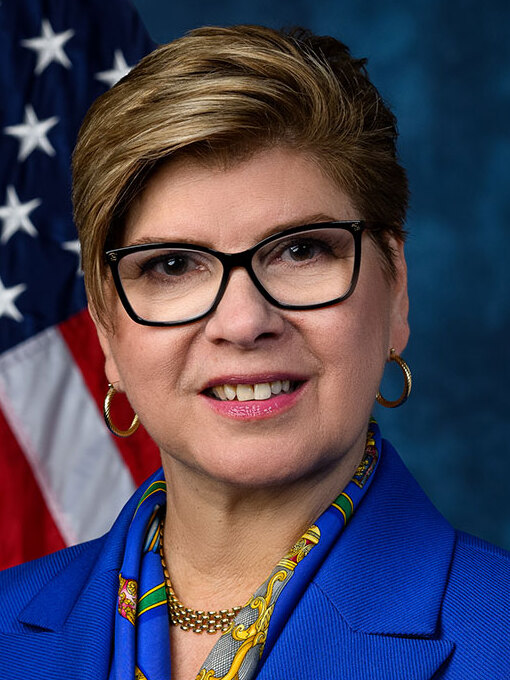

| Nominee | Nellie Pou | Rosie Pino |
| Party | Democratic | Republican |
| Popular vote | 123,604 | 58,868 |
| Percentage | 66.75% | 31.79% |
- Pou: 50–60% 60–70% 70–80% 80–90% Pino: 50–60% 70–80%
U.S. Representative before election
Nellie Pou
Democratic
Elected U.S. Representative
Nellie Pou
Democratic

The 9th district consists of the central urban areas of the Gateway Region, including the cities of Clifton, Passaic, and Paterson. The incumbent is Democrat Nellie Pou, who was elected with 50.8% of the vote in 2024.

=== Democratic primary ===
==== Nominee ====
- Nellie Pou, incumbent U.S. Representative

==== Declined ====
- Andre Sayegh, mayor of Paterson (2018–present) and candidate for this district in 2024 (running for re-election)

==== Endorsements ====
Nellie Pou

State officials

- Mikie Sherrill, governor of New Jersey (2026–present) and former NJ-11 (2019–2025)

U.S. representatives

- Debbie Wasserman Schultz, FL-25 (2005–present)

State legislators

- Alixon Collazos-Gill, state assemblymember from the 27th district (2024–present)

Local officials

- Brendan Gill, Essex County commissioner

Party officials

- 24 municipal chairs

Labor unions

- 32BJ SEIU
- American Federation of Government Employees
- Communications Workers of America District 1
- SEIU New Jersey State Council

Organizations

- Congressional Black Caucus
- Democrats for Education Reform
- Elect Democratic Women
- EMILY's List
- End Citizens United
- Giffords
- Gun Sense Voter
- Jewish Democratic Council of America
- Joint Action Committee for Political Affairs
- Latino Victory
- League of Conservation Voters Action Fund
- Planned Parenthood Action Fund
- Reproductive Freedom for All

Political parties

- Hudson County Democratic Committee
- Passaic County Democratic Committee

==== Fundraising ====
Campaign finance reports as of May 13, 2026
| Candidate | Raised | Spent | Cash on hand |
|---|---|---|---|
| Nellie Pou (D) | $2,327,473 | $970,112 | $1,509,835 |
Source: Federal Election Commission

==== Results ====
Democratic primary results
| Party | Candidate | Votes | % |
|---|---|---|---|
| Democratic | Nellie Pou (incumbent) | 27,790 | 100.0 |
| Total votes | | 27,790 | 100.0 |

=== Republican primary ===
==== Nominee ====
- Rosie Pino, Clifton city councilor

==== Eliminated in primary ====
- Tiffany Burress, attorney and wife of former NFL player Plaxico Burress

==== Withdrawn ====
- Billy Prempeh, sales consultant and nominee for this district in 2020, 2022, and 2024 (endorsed Burress)

==== Endorsements ====
Tiffany Burress

Party officials

- 3 county chairs

Individuals

- Billy Prempeh, sales consultant and former candidate for this district

Organizations

- Log Cabin Republicans
Rosie Pino

Individuals

- Frank Pallotta, former investment banker and Republican candidate for NJ-05 in 2020

Political parties

- Bergen County Republican Organization
- Kearny Republican Committee

Organizations

- New Jersey Right to Life PAC

==== County convention results ====
County convention results

Bergen County Republican Convention
| Party | Candidate | Votes | % |
|---|---|---|---|
| Republican | Rosie Pino | 91 | 57.2 |
| Republican | Tiffany Burress | 68 | 42.8 |
| Total votes | | 159 | 100.0 |

==== Fundraising ====
Campaign finance reports as of May 13, 2026
| Candidate | Raised | Spent | Cash on hand |
|---|---|---|---|
| Tiffany Burress (R) | $97,008 | $86,414 | $10,594 |
| Rosie Pino (R) | $367,495 | $338,883 | $33,611 |
Source: Federal Election Commission

==== Results ====
Republican primary results
| Party | Candidate | Votes | % |
|---|---|---|---|
| Republican | Rosie Pino | 6,711 | 51.3 |
| Republican | Tiffany Burress | 6,366 | 48.7 |
| Total votes | | 13,077 | 100.0 |

=== Third-party and independent candidates ===
==== Filed paperwork ====
- Terrisa Bukovinac (Save Our Babies), former president of Democrats for Life of America and candidate for the 2024 United States presidential election

==== Withdrawn ====
- Diomedes Minaya (God First), perennial candidate

=== General election ===
==== Predictions ====
| Source | Ranking | As of |
|---|---|---|
| Decision Desk HQ | Safe D | September 25, 2026 |
| The Cook Political Report | Likely D | April 7, 2026 |
| Inside Elections | Solid D | October 15, 2026 |
| Sabato's Crystal Ball | Likely D | July 30, 2026 |
| Silver Bulletin | Solid D | August 23, 2026 |

==== Post-primary endorsements ====
Rosie Pino (R)

Organizations

- National Republican Congressional Committee
Nellie Pou (D)

Labor unions

- AFL-CIO
- American Federation of Government Employees
- New Jersey State Building & Construction Trades Council
- New Jersey Teamsters

Organizations

- Latina Civic PAC
- National Troopers Coalition
- New Jersey Sierra Club

Newspapers

- The Bergen Record

==== Fundraising ====
Campaign finance reports as of October 14, 2026
| Candidate | Raised | Spent | Cash on hand |
|---|---|---|---|
| Nellie Pou (D) | $3,131,322 | $2,203,295 | $1,080,500 |
| Rosie Pino (R) | $548,326 | $535,193 | $13,133 |
Source: Federal Election Commission

==== Results ====
2026 New Jersey's 9th congressional district election
| Party | Candidate | Votes | % | ±% |
|---|---|---|---|---|
| Democratic | Nellie Pou (incumbent) | | | |
| Republican | Rosie Pino | | | |
| Save Our Babies | Terrisa Bukovinac | | | |
| Total votes | | | | |

== District 10 ==
2026 New Jersey's 10th congressional district election
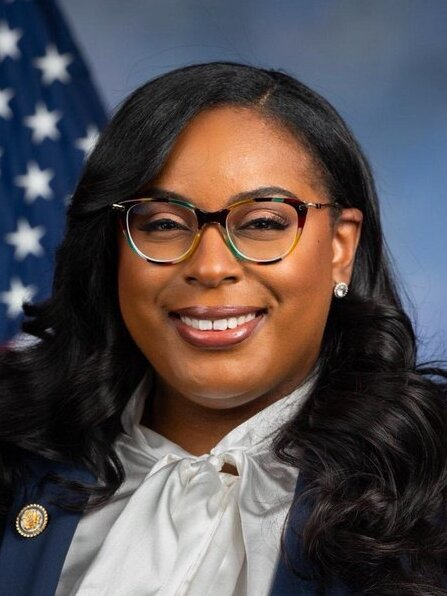

| Nominee | LaMonica McIver | Carmen Bucco |
| Party | Democratic | Republican |
| Popular vote | 153,579 | 27,912 |
| Percentage | 84.62% | 15.38% |
- McIver: 50–60% 60–70% 70–80% 80–90% >90% Bucco: 50–60%
U.S. Representative before election
LaMonica McIver
Democratic
Elected U.S. Representative
LaMonica McIver
Democratic

The 10th district is centered around the state's most populous city of Newark, taking in the neighboring Irvington and Orange, with a plurality African American population. The incumbent is Democrat LaMonica McIver, who was re-elected with 74.4% of the vote in 2024.

=== Democratic primary ===
==== Nominee ====
- LaMonica McIver, incumbent U.S. representative

==== Eliminated in primary ====
- Lawrence Poster, managing director at Catalyx Group

==== Endorsements ====
LaMonica McIver

Statewide officials

- Mikie Sherrill, governor of New Jersey (2026–present)

State legislators

- Teresa Ruiz, majority leader of the New Jersey Senate (2022–present) from SD-29 (2008–present)

Local officials

- Ras Baraka, mayor of Newark (2014–present)
- James Solomon, mayor of Jersey city (2026–present)

Individuals

- Lawrence Hamm, activist

Labor unions

- 32BJ SEIU
- American Federation of Government Employees
- Communications Workers of America District 1
- Rutgers AAUP–AFT
- SEIU New Jersey State Council

Political parties

- Essex County Democratic Committee
- Hudson County Democratic Committee
- New Jersey Working Families Party
- Union County Democratic Committee

Organizations

- Council on American–Islamic Relations Action
- Emgage Action
- League of Conservation Voters Action Fund
- Planned Parenthood Action Fund
- Progressive Democrats of America
- Vote Mama

==== Fundraising ====
Campaign finance reports as of May 13, 2026
| Candidate | Raised | Spent | Cash on hand |
|---|---|---|---|
| LaMonica McIver (D) | $1,798,118 | $1,373,520 | $587,809 |
Source: Federal Election Commission

==== Results ====
Democratic primary results
| Party | Candidate | Votes | % |
|---|---|---|---|
| Democratic | LaMonica McIver (incumbent) | 38,769 | 84.8 |
| Democratic | Lawrence Poster | 6,935 | 15.2 |
| Total votes | | 45,704 | 100.0 |

=== Republican primary ===
==== Nominee ====
- Carmen Bucco, small business owner, perennial candidate, and nominee for this district in the 2024 special and regular elections

==== Fundraising ====
Campaign finance reports as of May 13, 2026
| Candidate | Raised | Spent | Cash on hand |
|---|---|---|---|
| Carmen Bucco (R) | $2,270 | $403 | $1,867 |
Source: Federal Election Commission

==== Results ====
Republican primary results
| Party | Candidate | Votes | % |
|---|---|---|---|
| Republican | Carmen Bucco | 4,359 | 100.0 |
| Total votes | | 4,359 | 100.0 |

=== Third-party and Independent candidates ===
==== Formed exploratory committee ====
- Jon Serrano, college student and Green Party nominee for this district in 2024

=== General election ===
==== Predictions ====
| Source | Ranking | As of |
|---|---|---|
| Decision Desk HQ | Safe D | July 14, 2026 |
| The Cook Political Report | Solid D | August 13, 2025 |
| Inside Elections | Solid D | March 7, 2025 |
| Sabato's Crystal Ball | Safe D | April 10, 2025 |
| Silver Bulletin | Solid D | August 23, 2026 |

==== Post-primary endorsements ====
LaMonica McIver (D)

Labor unions

- AFL-CIO
- American Federation of Government Employees
- New Jersey Teamsters

Organizations

- CAIR Action
- National Women's Political Caucus
- New Jersey Sierra Club
Carmen Bucco (R)

Local officials

- Donna Jackson, Newark municipal councilmember at-large (2026–present) (Democratic)

Labor unions

- New Jersey State Policemen’s Benevolent Association
Declined to endorse

Labor unions

- New Jersey State Building & Construction Trades Council

==== Fundraising ====
Campaign finance reports as of September 30, 2026
| Candidate | Raised | Spent | Cash on hand |
|---|---|---|---|
| LaMonica McIver (D) | $2,473,124 | $1,728,188 | $908,149 |
| Carmen Bucco (R) | $8,656 | $3,898 | $4,758 |
Source: Federal Election Commission

==== Results ====
2026 New Jersey's 10th congressional district election
| Party | Candidate | Votes | % | ±% |
|---|---|---|---|---|
| Democratic | LaMonica McIver (incumbent) | | | |
| Republican | Carmen Bucco | | | |
| Total votes | | | | |

== District 11 ==
2026 New Jersey's 11th congressional district election
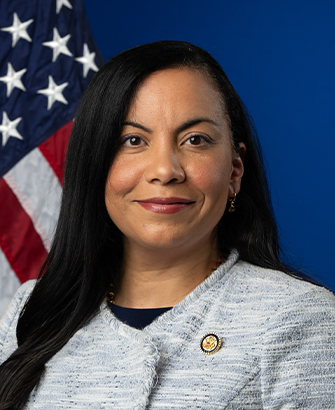

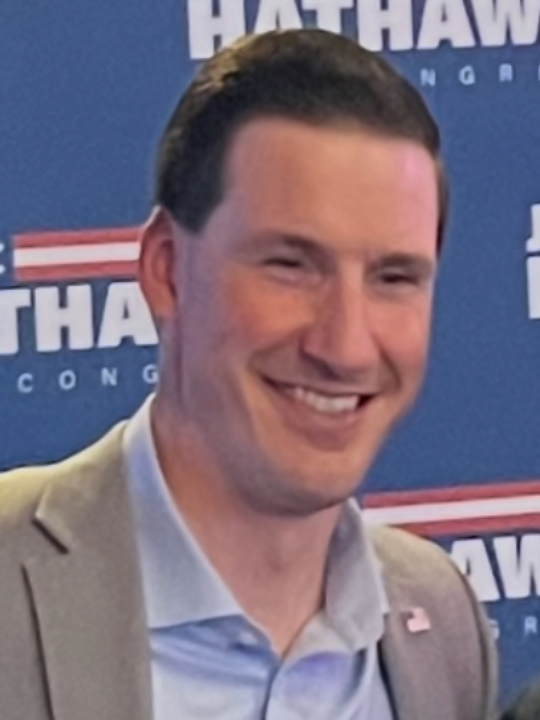
| Nominee | Analilia Mejia | Joe Hathaway |
| Party | Democratic | Republican |
| Popular vote | 170,498 | 107,369 |
| Percentage | 60.81% | 38.29% |
- Mejia: 50–60% 60–70% 70–80% 80–90% >90% Hathaway: 40–50% 50–60% 60–70%
U.S. Representative before election
Analilia Mejia
Democratic
Elected U.S. Representative
Analilia Mejia
Democratic

The 11th district is centered in Morris County and includes the outer suburbs of the New York metropolitan area, including the towns of Montclair and Morristown. The incumbent was Democrat Mikie Sherrill, who was re-elected with 56.5% of the vote in 2024. The seat became vacant on November 20, 2025, after Sherrill won the 2025 election for governor of New Jersey. A special election was held on April 16, 2026, to fill the remainder of her term. Analilia Mejia won the special election to fill the remainder of Sherrill's term, and has declared intention to seek a full term this November.

=== Democratic primary ===
==== Nominee ====
- Analilia Mejia, incumbent U.S. representative (2026–present)

==== Eliminated in primary ====
- Donald Cresitello, former mayor of Morristown (1977–1981, 2006–2010), candidate for U.S. Senate in 1982 and 2008, and disqualified candidate for this district in the April special election
- Joseph Lewis, tech engineer
- Justin Strickland, Chatham Borough councilmember and candidate for this district in the April special election

==== Declined ====
- Rosy Bagolie, state assemblymember from the 27th district (2024–present)
- Zach Beecher, U.S. Army veteran, venture capitalist, and candidate for this district in the April special election
- J-L Cauvin, attorney, comedian, and candidate for this district in the April special election (endorsed Mejia)
- Cammie Croft, nonprofit executive, former White House deputy new media director, and candidate for this district in the April special election (endorsed Mejia)
- Brendan Gill, at-large Essex County commissioner, husband of state assemblymember Alixon Collazos-Gill, candidate for New Jersey's 27th assembly district in 2023, and candidate for this district in the April special election (endorsed Mejia)
- Tom Malinowski, former chair of the Hunterdon County Democratic Party (2024–2025), former U.S. representative from the 7th district (2019–2023), and candidate for this district in the April special election (endorsed Mejia)
- Tahesha Way, former lieutenant governor (2023–2026) and secretary of state of New Jersey (2018–2026) and candidate for this district in the April special election
- Anna Lee Williams, corporate social responsibility manager and candidate for this district in the April special election (endorsed Mejia)

==== Endorsements ====
Analilia Mejia

U.S. senators

- Cory Booker, New Jersey (2013–present)
- Andy Kim, New Jersey (2024–present)

U.S. representatives

- Donald Norcross, NJ-01 (2014–present)
- Herb Conaway, NJ-03 (2025–present)
- Frank Pallone, NJ-06 (1988–present)
- Rob Menendez, NJ-08 (2023–present)
- Nellie Pou, NJ-09 (2025–present)
- LaMonica McIver, NJ-10 (2024–present)
- Bonnie Watson Coleman, NJ-12 (2015–present)
- Tom Malinowski, former chair of the Hunterdon County Democratic Party (2024–2025), former NJ-07 (2019–2023), and candidate for this district in the April special election

Party officials

- LeRoy J. Jones Jr., chair of the New Jersey Democratic Party (2021–present)

Political parties

- Essex County Democratic Committee
- Morris County Democratic Committee
- Passaic County Democratic Committee

Labor unions

- American Federation of Government Employees
- International Association of Sheet Metal, Air, Rail and Transportation Workers
- New Jersey Education Association
- SEIU New Jersey State Council

Organizations

- Council on American–Islamic Relations Action
- Emgage Action
- Giffords
- J Street
- Progressive Democrats of America
- Progressive Victory
- Track AIPAC

==== Fundraising ====
Campaign finance reports as of May 13, 2026
| Candidate | Raised | Spent | Cash on hand |
|---|---|---|---|
| Joseph Lewis (D) | $102,345 | $10,119 | $83,608 |
| Analilia Mejia (D) | $1,539,748 | $1,405,353 | $134,395 |
| Justin Strickland (D) | $88,756 | $87,568 | $1,187 |
Source: Federal Election Commission

==== Results ====

Mejia

80–90%

Mejia

30–40%
40–50%
50–60%
60–70%
70–80%
80–90%
90–100%

Lewis

30–40%

Other

No Votes

Democratic primary results
| Party | Candidate | Votes | % |
|---|---|---|---|
| Democratic | Analilia Mejia (incumbent) | 52,908 | 81.7 |
| Democratic | Donald Cresitello | 4,443 | 6.9 |
| Democratic | Justin Strickland | 3,929 | 6.1 |
| Democratic | Joseph Lewis | 3,507 | 5.4 |
| Total votes | | 64,787 | 100.0 |

=== Republican primary ===
==== Nominee ====
- Joe Hathaway, Randolph Township Council member, former mayor, and nominee in the April special election

==== Fundraising ====
Campaign finance reports as of May 13, 2026
| Candidate | Raised | Spent | Cash on hand |
|---|---|---|---|
| Joe Hathaway (R) | $624,231 | $618,881 | $5,349 |
Source: Federal Election Commission

==== Endorsements ====
Joe Hathaway

Organizations

- Americans for Tax Reform
- Log Cabin Republicans

==== Results ====
Republican primary results
| Party | Candidate | Votes | % |
|---|---|---|---|
| Republican | Joe Hathaway | 23,961 | 100.0 |
| Total votes | | 23,961 | 100.0 |

=== Third-party and independent candidates ===
==== Filed paperwork ====
- Alan Bond (Hope for Tomorrow), former money manager and candidate in the April special election
- Russell Jenkins (One for All), candidate for NJ-10 in the 2024 special election
- Vincent Matrisciano (Common Sense Independent), retired federal employee

=== General election ===
==== Post-primary endorsements ====
Joe Hathaway (R)

Labor unions

- New Jersey State Policemen’s Benevolent Association
Analilia Mejia (D)

Labor unions

- AFL-CIO
- American Federation of Government Employees
- New Jersey Teamsters

Organizations

- CAIR Action
- Latina Civic PAC
- New Jersey Sierra Club

News organizations

- Daily Record
Declined to endorse

Labor unions

- New Jersey State Building & Construction Trades Council

==== Predictions ====
| Source | Ranking | As of |
|---|---|---|
| Decision Desk HQ | Safe D | July 14, 2026 |
| The Cook Political Report | Solid D | August 13, 2025 |
| Inside Elections | Solid D | March 7, 2025 |
| Sabato's Crystal Ball | Safe D | April 10, 2025 |
| Silver Bulletin | Solid D | August 23, 2026 |

==== Fundraising ====
Campaign finance reports as of September 30, 2026
| Candidate | Raised | Spent | Cash on hand |
|---|---|---|---|
| Analilia Mejia (D) | $2,128,845 | $2,040,680 | $88,165 |
| Joe Hathaway (R) | $806,708 | $772,398 | $34,310 |
Source: Federal Election Commission

==== Results ====
2026 New Jersey's 11th congressional district election
| Party | Candidate | Votes | % | ±% |
|---|---|---|---|---|
| Democratic | Analilia Mejia (incumbent) | | | |
| Republican | Joe Hathaway | | | |
| Hope for Tomorrow | Alan B. Bond | | | |
| Total votes | | | | |

== District 12 ==
2026 New Jersey's 12th congressional district election
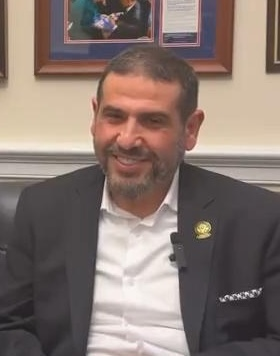

| Nominee | Adam Hamawy | Gregg Mele |
| Party | Democratic | Republican |
| Popular vote | 167,263 | 66,247 |
| Percentage | 70.55% | 27.94% |
- Hamawy: 50–60% 60–70% 70–80% 80–90% >90% Mele: 40–50% 50–60%
U.S. Representative before election
Bonnie Watson Coleman
Democratic
Elected U.S. Representative
Adam Hamawy
Democratic

The 12th district is composed of much of Central Jersey, taking in the state capital Trenton and neighboring Princeton University, along with Plainfield to the north. The incumbent is Democrat Bonnie Watson Coleman, who was re-elected with 61.2% of the vote in 2024.

=== Democratic primary ===
==== Nominee ====
- Adam Hamawy, surgeon

==== Eliminated in primary ====
- Matt Adams, U.S. Army reserve officer and former Middlesex councilmember
- Sue Altman, former state director for U.S. senator Andy Kim and nominee for the 7th district in 2024
- Brad Cohen, mayor of East Brunswick
- Kyle Little, fitness studio owner
- Adrian Mapp, mayor of Plainfield
- Verlina Reynolds-Jackson, state assemblymember from the 15th district (2018–present)
- Shanel Robinson, Somerset County commissioner
- Squire Servance, attorney
- Sujit Singh, technology consultant
- Jay Vaingankar, former U.S. Department of Energy special advisor
- Sam Wang, professor

==== Withdrawn ====
- Mike Anderson, entrepreneur
- Elijah Dixon, entrepreneur (remained on ballot; endorsed Hamawy)
- Ray Heck, mayor of Millstone (endorsed Robinson)
- Rick Morales, anesthesiologist
- Iziah Thompson, housing organizer
- Bonnie Watson Coleman, incumbent U.S. representative

==== Declined ====
- Paula Sollami Covello, Mercer County clerk (endorsed Reynolds-Jackson)
- Reed Gusciora, mayor of Trenton (2018–present) and nominee for the 4th district in 2000 (endorsed Reynolds-Jackson)
- Tennille McCoy, state assemblymember from the 14th district (2024–present)
- Andrew Zwicker, state senator from the 16th district (2022–present) and candidate for this district in 2014

==== Endorsements ====
Sue Altman

Executive branch officials

- Heather H. Howard, former associate director of the United States Domestic Policy Council during the Clinton Administration

U.S. senators

- Bill Bradley, New Jersey (1979–1997)
- Robert Torricelli, New Jersey (1997–2003)

Statewide officials

- Jon Corzine, former governor of New Jersey (2006–2010)

Local officials

- Liz Lempert, deputy mayor of Princeton Township, New Jersey (2013–present)

Political parties

- Working Families Party

Organizations

- College Democrats of New Jersey
- Gun Sense Voter (co-endorsement with Cohen, Hamawy, Little, Mapp, Robinson, Singh, Vaingankar, and Wang)
- J Street PAC
- NJ Citizen Action
- Patriotic Millionaires
Brad Cohen

State legislators

- Patrick Diegnan, state senator from the 18th district (2016–present)
- Linda Greenstein, state senator from the 14th district (2010–present)
- Robert Karabinchak, state assemblyman from the 18th district (2016–present)
- Sterley Stanley, state assemblyman from the 18th district (2021–present)

Individuals

- Julie Roginsky, founder of Lift Our Voices

Political parties

- Middlesex County Democratic Committee

Organizations

- Gun Sense Voter (co-endorsement with Altman, Hamawy, Little, Mapp, Robinson, Singh, Vaingankar, and Wang)
Adam Hamawy

Executive branch officials

- Josh Paul, former director of congressional and public affairs for the Bureau of Political-Military Affairs

U.S. senators

- Tammy Duckworth, Illinois (2017–present)
- Bernie Sanders, Vermont (2007–present) (Independent)

U.S. representatives

- Jamaal Bowman, former NY-16 (2021–2025)
- Greg Casar, TX-35 (2023–present)
- Maxwell Frost, FL-10 (2023–present)
- Chuy Garcia, IL-04 (2019–present)
- Pramila Jayapal, WA-07 (2017–present)
- Ro Khanna, CA-17 (2017–present)
- Summer Lee, PA-12 (2023–present)
- Alexandria Ocasio-Cortez, NY-14 (2019–present)
- Ilhan Omar, MN-05 (2019–present)
- Delia Ramirez, IL-03 (2023–present)
- Lateefah Simon, CA-12 (2025-present)
- Robert Garcia, CA-42 (2023-present
- Rashida Tlaib, MI-12 (2019-present)
- Jill Tokuda, HI-02 (2023–present)

Statewide officials

- Keith Ellison, attorney general of Minnesota (2019–present)

State legislators

- Sadaf Jaffer, former state assemblymember from the 16th district (2022–2024)
- Chris Rabb, Pennsylvania state representative from the 200th district (2017–present) and 2026 Democratic nominee for PA-3

Individuals

- Elijah Dixon, entrepreneur and former candidate for this seat
- Hasan Piker, political commentator
- Linda Sarsour, political activist

Labor Unions

- National Nurses United
- Rutgers AAUP–AFT

Organizations

- 314 Action
- American Priorities
- Christopher Street Project
- Congressional Progressive Caucus
- Council on American–Islamic Relations Action
- Emgage Action
- Hindus for Human Rights Action
- Gun Sense Voter (co-endorsement with Altman, Cohen, Little, Mapp, Robinson, Singh, Vaingankar, and Wang)
- Jewish Voice for Peace Action
- Justice Democrats
- New American Leaders Action Fund
- Our Revolution
- PAL PAC
- Progressive Change Campaign Committee
- Progressive Democrats of America
- Progressive Victory
- Sunrise Movement
- Track AIPAC
- US Campaign for Palestinian Rights Action
Kyle Little

Organizations

- Gun Sense Voter (co-endorsement with Altman, Cohen, Hamawy, Mapp, Robinson, Singh, Vaingankar, and Wang)
Adrian Mapp

State legislators

- Linda S. Carter, state assemblymember from the 22nd district (2018–present)
- James J. Kennedy, state assemblymember from the 22nd district (2016–present)
- Nicholas Scutari, president of the New Jersey Senate (2022–present) from the 22nd district (2004–present)

Local officials

- 9 county commissioners

Political parties

- Union County Democratic Committee

Labor unions

- New Jersey Firefighters' Mutual Benevolent Association

Organizations

- Gun Sense Voter (co-endorsement with Altman, Cohen, Hamawy, Little, Robinson, Singh, Vaingankar, and Wang)
Shanel Robinson

State legislators

- Joseph Danielsen, state assemblymember from the 17th district (2014–present)

Local officials

- Ray Heck, mayor of Millstone and former candidate for this district
- 4 Somerset County commissioners

Organizations

- Gun Sense Voter (co-endorsement with Altman, Cohen, Hamawy, Little, Mapp, Singh, Vaingankar, and Wang)
- With Honor Fund

Political parties

- Franklin Township Democratic Committee
- Somerset County Democratic Committee
Verlina Reynolds-Jackson

State legislators

- Wayne DeAngelo, state assemblymember from the 14th district (2008–present)
- Shirley Turner, president pro tempore of the New Jersey Senate (2002–2010, 2024–present) from the 15th district (1998–present)
- Anthony Verrelli, state assemblymember from the 15th district (2018–present)

Local officials

- Dan Benson, Mercer County Executive (2024–present)
- Reed Gusciora, mayor of Trenton (2018–present)
- 4 Mercer County commissioners
- 2 other mayors

Labor Unions

- Communications Workers of America District 1
- Eastern Atlantic States Regional Council of Carpenters

Political parties

- Mercer County Democratic Committee
Sujit Singh

Organizations

- Gun Sense Voter (co-endorsement with Altman, Cohen, Hamawy, Little, Mapp, Robinson, Vaingankar, and Wang)
Jay Vaingankar

Executive branch officials

- W. Michael Blumenthal, former United States Secretary of the Treasury (1977–1979)
- Jennifer Granholm, former secretary of energy (2021–2025)

U.S. representatives

- Raja Krishnamoorthi, IL-08 (2017–present)

Organizations

- AAPI Victory Fund
- Gun Sense Voter (co-endorsement with Altman, Cohen, Hamawy, Little, Mapp, Robinson, Singh, and Wang)
Sam Wang

Party officials

- Andrew Yang, chair of the Forward Party (2022–present) and 2020 Democratic presidential candidate

Individuals

- Danielle Allen, James Bryant Conant University Professor at Harvard University and daughter of William B. Allen
- Robert Hamilton Austin, professor of physics at Princeton University
- Carlos Brody, investigator of the Howard Hughes Medical Institute
- Paul DiMaggio, professor of sociology at New York University
- Mitchell Duneier, chair of the sociology department at Princeton University
- John Hopfield, physicist
- Shirley M. Tilghman, former president of Princeton University (2001–2013)

Organizations

- Gun Sense Voter (co-endorsement with Altman, Cohen, Hamawy, Little, Mapp, Robinson, Singh, and Vaingankar)
Declined to endorse

U.S. representatives

- Bonnie Watson Coleman, NJ-12 (2015–present) (endorsed against Cohen)

State legislators

- Andrew Zwicker, state senator from the 16th district (2022–present)

==== County convention results ====
County convention results

Mercer County Democratic Convention
| Party | Candidate | Votes | % |
|---|---|---|---|
| Democratic | Verlina Reynolds-Jackson | 140 | 62.5 |
| Democratic | Sue Altman | 39 | 17.4 |
| Democratic | Jay Vaingankar | 16 | 7.1 |
| Democratic | Adam Hamawy | 7 | 3.1 |
| Democratic | Sam Wang | 7 | 3.1 |
| Democratic | Shanel Robinson | 4 | 1.8 |
| Democratic | Brad Cohen | 3 | 1.3 |
| Democratic | Squire Servance | 3 | 1.3 |
| Democratic | Elijah Dixon | 2 | 0.9 |
| Democratic | Sujit Singh | 2 | 0.9 |
| Democratic | Matt Adams | 1 | 0.4 |
| Democratic | Adrian Mapp | 0 | 0.0 |
| Total votes | | 224 | 100.0 |

Middlesex County Democratic Convention
| Party | Candidate | Votes | % |
|---|---|---|---|
| Democratic | Brad Cohen | — | 67 |
| Democratic | Sue Altman | — | 11 |
| Democratic | Verlina Reynolds-Jackson | — | 9 |
| Democratic | Adam Hamawy | — | 6 |
| Democratic | Squire Servance | — | 2 |
| Democratic | Matt Adams | — | 2 |
| Democratic | Adrian Mapp | — | 1 |
| Democratic | Jay Vaingankar | — | 1 |
| Democratic | Sujit Singh | — | 1 |
| Total votes | | — (Note: No vote totals were reported) | 100.0 |

Somerset County Democratic Convention
| Party | Candidate | Votes | % |
|---|---|---|---|
| Democratic | Shanel Robinson | 100 | 86.2 |
| Democratic | Sam Wang | 5 | 4.3 |
| Democratic | Sue Altman | 4 | 3.4 |
| Democratic | Adam Hamawy | 4 | 3.4 |
| Democratic | Brad Cohen | 3 | 2.6 |
| Democratic | Verlina Reynolds-Jackson | 0 | 0.0 |
| Democratic | Squire Servance | 0 | 0.0 |
| Total votes | | 116 | 100.0 |

==== Debates and forums ====
2026 NJ-12 Democratic primary debates and forums
| No. | Date | Host | Moderator | Link | Participants | | | | | | | | |
| P Participant A Absent N Non-invitee I Invitee W Withdrawn | | | | | | | | | | | | | |
| P Participant A Absent N Non-invitee I Invitee W Withdrawn | | | | | Altman | Cohen | Hamawy | Mapp | Reynolds-Jackson | Robinson | Servance | Vaingankar | Wang |
|---|---|---|---|---|---|---|---|---|---|---|---|---|---|
| 1 | April 26, 2026 | New Jersey Globe | David Wildstein | YouTube | P | P | P | P | P | P | P | P | P |

==== Fundraising ====
Campaign finance reports as of May 13, 2026
| Candidate | Raised | Spent | Cash on hand |
|---|---|---|---|
| Matt Adams (D) | $85,764 | $65,942 | $19,821 |
| Sue Altman (D) | $490,067 | $289,698 | $200,369 |
| Brad Cohen (D) | $700,545 | $517,991 | $182,553 |
| Adam Hamawy (D) | $1,028,936 | $718,239 | $310,697 |
| Kyle Little (D) | $30,555 | $35,089 | $2,580 |
| Adrian Mapp (D) | $430,668 | $362,655 | $68,012 |
| Verlina Reynolds-Jackson (D) | $282,597 | $220,828 | $61,768 |
| Shanel Robinson (D) | $140,250 | $96,343 | $43,906 |
| Squire Servance (D) | $390,651 | $333,045 | $57,605 |
| Sujit Singh (D) | $126,524 | $43,170 | $83,353 |
| Jay Vanigankar (D) | $285,299 | $249,169 | $36,130 |
| Samuel Wang (D) | $465,174 | $294,284 | $170,889 |
Source: Federal Election Commission

==== Polling ====
| Poll source | Date(s) administered | Sample size | Margin of error | Sue Altman | Brad Cohen | Adam Hamawy | Verlina Reynolds-Jackson | Other | Undecided |
|---|---|---|---|---|---|---|---|---|---|
| Workbench Strategy (Note: Poll sponsored by Hamawy's campaign) | May 5–7, 2026 | 400 (LV) | ± 4.9% | 12% | 11% | 19% | 10% | 39% (Note: Adrian Mapp, Shanel Robinson, Squire Servance, Jay Vaingankar, and Sam Wang with a combined 25%; "Someone else" with 14%) | 8% |
| Workbench Strategy | March 30 – April 1, 2026 | 400 (LV) | ± 4.9% | 12% | 11% | 5% | 16% | 43% (Note: Adrian Mapp, Shanel Robinson, Jay Vaingankar, and Sam Wang with a combined 14%; "Someone else" with 29%) | 15% |

==== Results ====
Democratic primary results
| Party | Candidate | Votes | % |
|---|---|---|---|
| Democratic | Adam Hamawy | 22,265 | 28.6 |
| Democratic | Brad Cohen | 11,353 | 14.6 |
| Democratic | Sam Wang | 7,286 | 9.4 |
| Democratic | Shanel Robinson | 6,905 | 8.9 |
| Democratic | Verlina Reynolds-Jackson | 6,858 | 8.8 |
| Democratic | Sue Altman | 6,595 | 8.5 |
| Democratic | Squire Servance | 4,273 | 5.5 |
| Democratic | Adrian Mapp | 3,389 | 4.4 |
| Democratic | Sujit Singh | 3,045 | 3.9 |
| Democratic | Jay Vaingankar | 2,348 | 3.0 |
| Democratic | Matt Adams | 1,613 | 2.1 |
| Democratic | Elijah Dixon (withdrawn) | 1,150 | 1.5 |
| Democratic | Kyle Little | 674 | 0.9 |
| Total votes | | 77,754 | 100.0 |

=== Republican primary ===
==== Nominee ====
- Gregg Mele, attorney and perennial candidate

==== Withdrawn ====
- Andrew Zaborney, Spotswood councilmember (running for Middlesex County commission)

==== Endorsements ====
Gregg Mele

Political parties

- Mercer County Republican Organization
- Middlesex County Republican Organization
- Somerset County Republican Organization

==== County convention results ====
County convention results

Mercer County Republican Convention
| Party | Candidate | Votes | % |
|---|---|---|---|
| Republican | Gregg Mele | 26 | 81.3 |
| Republican | David Brown | 6 | 18.8 |
| Total votes | | 32 | 100.0 |

Somerset County Republican Convention
| Party | Candidate | Votes | % |
|---|---|---|---|
| Republican | Gregg Mele | 41 | 87.2 |
| Republican | David Brown | 6 | 12.7 |
| Total votes | | 47 | 100.0 |

==== Fundraising ====
Campaign finance reports as of May 13, 2026
| Candidate | Raised | Spent | Cash on hand |
|---|---|---|---|
| Gregg Mele (R) | $67,518 | $62,335 | $5,182 |
Source: Federal Election Commission

==== Results ====
Republican primary results
| Party | Candidate | Votes | % |
|---|---|---|---|
| Republican | Gregg Mele | 13,298 | 100.0 |
| Total votes | | 13,298 | 100.0 |

=== Third-party and independent candidates ===
==== Filed paperwork ====
- Andres Jinete (Green Party), organizer
- Winston Jordan (Get Money Out), IT executive

==== Withdrawn ====
- Matt Adams, U.S. Army reserve officer, former Middlesex councilmember, and candidate for this seat

=== General election ===
==== Post-primary endorsements ====
Adam Hamawy (D)

Labor unions

- AFL-CIO
- American Federation of Government Employees

Organizations

- CAIR Action
- Giffords
- New Jersey Sierra Club

Political parties

- New Jersey Working Families Party
Declined to endorse

Labor unions

- New Jersey State Building & Construction Trades Council

==== Predictions ====
| Source | Ranking | As of |
|---|---|---|
| Decision Desk HQ | Safe D | July 14, 2026 |
| The Cook Political Report | Solid D | August 13, 2025 |
| Inside Elections | Solid D | March 7, 2025 |
| Sabato's Crystal Ball | Safe D | April 10, 2025 |
| Silver Bulletin | Solid D | August 23, 2026 |

==== Fundraising ====
Campaign finance reports as of September 30, 2026
| Candidate | Raised | Spent | Cash on hand |
|---|---|---|---|
| Adam Hamawy (D) | $1,908,271 | $1,611,643 | $296,627 |
| Gregg Mele (R) | $95,702 | $85,369 | $10,333 |
Source: Federal Election Commission

==== Results ====
2026 New Jersey's 12th congressional district election
| Party | Candidate | Votes | % | ±% |
|---|---|---|---|---|
| Democratic | Adam Hamawy | | | |
| Republican | Gregg Mele | | | |
| Green | Andres Jinete | | | |
| Get Money Out | Winston Jordan | | | |
| Total votes | | | | |

== Notes ==
Partisan clients
