= 2028 United States House of Representatives elections in New Jersey =

- November 7, 2028

All 12 New Jersey seats to the United States House of Representatives
Party	Democratic	Republican
Last election	11	1

The 2028 United States House of Representatives elections in New Jersey will be held on November 7, 2028, to elect the 12 U.S. representatives from the State of New Jersey, one from all 12 of the state's congressional districts. The elections will coincide with the 2028 U.S. presidential eleciton, other elections to the House of Representatives, elections to the United States Senate, and various state and local elections. The primary election will take place on a date that has not yet been announced.

== District 1 ==
The 1st district consists of the South Jersey suburbs of Philadelphia, including the municipalities of Camden and Cherry Hill. Incumbent Democrat Donald Norcross was re-elected with 70.4% of the vote in 2026.

=== Democratic Primary ===
==== Potential ====
- Donald Norcross, incumbent U.S. representative

== District 2 ==
The 2nd district covers the majority of South Jersey, taking in Atlantic City, Vineland, the Pine Barrens, and parts of the Philadelphia metropolitan area. It also stretches into southern Ocean County, taking in Long Beach Island, Little Egg Harbor, and parts of Berkeley. The incumbent will be Democrat Zack Mullock, who flipped the district and was elected with 50.8% of the vote.

Jeff Van Drew, the Republican incumbent Mullock ousted in 2026, retained his campaign staff and kept campaign offices open as he explored a 2028 rematch. He told the New Jersey Globe he is "very interested" in a rematch against Mullock. He filed a statement of candidacy for the 2028 election with the Federal Election Commission on November 6, 2026.

=== Democratic primary ===
==== Potential ====
- Zack Mullock, incumbent U.S. representative-elect

=== Republican primary ===
==== Publicly expressed interest ====
- Vincent J. Polistina, state senator from the 2nd district (2021–present) (will not run if Van Drew runs)
- Jeff Van Drew, outgoing U.S. representative from New Jersey's 2nd congressional district (2019–present)

==== Potential ====
- Curtis Bashaw, member-elect of the Cape May County Board of County Commissioners and nominee for U.S. Senate in 2024
- Michael Donohue, chair of the Cape May County Republican Party
- Greg Myhre, state assemblymember from the 9th district (2024–present)
- Mike Testa, state senator from the 1st district (2019–present)

== District 3 ==
The 3rd district is centralized around much of Burlington County, as well as parts of Mercer and Monmouth counties. The incumbent is Democrat Herb Conaway who was re-elected with 62.8% of the vote in 2026.

=== Democratic primary ===
==== Potential ====
- Herb Conaway, incumbent U.S. representative

== District 4 ==
The 4th district covers the upper Jersey Shore and expands into Monmouth and Ocean counties, taking in Lakewood Township and Toms River. The incumbent is Republican Chris Smith, who was re-elected with 58.9% of the vote in 2026.

=== Republican primary ===
==== Potential ====
- Chris Smith, incumbent U.S. representative

== District 5 ==
The 5th district stretches across the state's northern border with New York, from Sussex to Bergen counties. The incumbent is Democrat Josh Gottheimer, who was re-elected with 62.5% of the vote in 2026.

=== Democratic primary ===
==== Potential ====
- Josh Gottheimer, incumbent U.S. representative

== District 6 ==
The 6th district takes in towns along the Raritan Bay, including Edison and Woodbridge, while also stretching into coastal Monmouth County. The incumbent is Democrat Frank Pallone, who was re-elected with 69.5% of the vote in 2026.

=== Democratic primary ===
==== Potential ====
- Frank Pallone, incumbent U.S. representative

== District 7 ==
The 7th district is one of the wealthiest districts in the U.S., encompassing the New Jersey Highlands of Hunterdon and Warren counties. The incumbent is Democrat Rebecca Bennett, who flipped the district and was elected with 57.2% of the vote in 2026.

=== Democratic primary ===
==== Potential ====
- Rebecca Bennett, incumbent U.S. representative-elect

=== Republican primary ===
==== Filed paperwork ====
- Dana DiRisio, former aide U.S. representative Scott Garrett and candidate for the 5th district in 2020

==== Potential ====
- Lori Ciesla, member of the Warren County Board of County Commissioners
- Elizabeth Fagan, mayor of Summit
- Dawn Fantasia, state assemblymember from the 24th district (2024–present)
- Mac Hugin, U.S. Marine veteran and son of Bob Hugin
- Mike Inganamort, state assemblymember from the 24th district (2024–present)
- James Kern, member of the Warren County Board of County Commissioners
- William G. Mennen IV, judge for the New Jersey Superior Court and former member of the Hunterdon County Board of County Commissioners
- Matt Moench, mayor of Bridgewater
- Shaun Van Doren, member of the Hunterdon County Board of County Commissioners

== District 8 ==
The 8th district is majority Hispanic and contains the urban areas of Elizabeth, Hoboken, and Union City, as well as parts of Newark and Jersey City. The incumbent is Democrat Rob Menendez, who was re-elected with 88.9% of the vote in 2026.

=== Democratic primary ===
==== Potential ====
- Rob Menendez, incumbent U.S. representative

== District 9 ==
The 9th district consists of the central urban areas of the Gateway Region, including the cities of Clifton, Passaic, and Paterson. The incumbent is Democrat Nellie Pou, who was re-elected with 66.8% of the vote in 2026.

=== Democratic primary ===
==== Potential ====
- Nellie Pou, incumbent U.S. representative

== District 10 ==
The 10th district is centered around the state's most populous city of Newark, taking in the neighboring Irvington and Orange, with a plurality African American population. The incumbent is Democrat LaMonica McIver, who was re-elected with 84.6% of the vote in 2026.

=== Democratic primary ===
==== Potential ====
- LaMonica McIver, incumbent U.S. representative

== District 11 ==
The 11th district is centered in Morris County and includes the outer suburbs of the New York metropolitan area, including the towns of Montclair and Morristown. The incumbent is Democrat Analilia Mejia, who was re-elected with 61.0% of the vote in 2026.

=== Democratic primary ===
==== Potential ====
- Analilia Mejia, incumbent U.S. representative

== District 12 ==
The 12th district is composed of much of Central Jersey, taking in the state capital Trenton and neighboring Princeton University, along with Plainfield to the north. The incumbent is Democrat Adam Hamawy, who was elected with 70.7% of the vote in 2026.

=== Democratic primary ===
==== Potential ====
- Adam Hamawy, incumbent U.S. representative
