= Adam Hamawy =

American surgeon, politician (born 1969/1970)

- ٱدم حموي
- Hamawy in 2026

Member-elect of the U.S. House of Representatives from New Jersey's 12th district
- Assuming office January 3, 2027
- Succeeding: Bonnie Watson Coleman

Personal details
- Born: Adam Hisham Hamawy; 1969 or 1970 (age 56–57) Egypt
- Party: Democratic
- Children: 4
- Education: Rutgers University, New Brunswick (BS); University of Medicine and Dentistry of New Jersey (MD); Rutgers University, Camden (MBA)
- Website: Campaign website

Military service
- Branch/service: United States Army
- Rank: Lieutenant Colonel
- Battles/wars: Iraq War
- Awards: Meritorious Service Medal; Army Commendation Medal (3)

Adam Hisham Hamawy (ٱدم هشام حموي; born 1969/1970) is an American plastic surgeon and former U.S. Army physician who is the member-elect for New Jersey's 12th congressional district. Hamawy specializes in both cosmetic and reconstructive procedures at his practice in Princeton, New Jersey.

Hamawy gained national attention in 2024 as part of a volunteer team of American doctors in Gaza who were unable to leave after Israel seized and closed the Rafah border crossing during the Gaza war. Army National Guard veteran and U.S. senator Tammy Duckworth, who credits Hamawy with saving her life when they were both serving in the Iraq War in 2004, personally intervened to help them leave. Hamawy was one of three doctors who chose to stay behind until the non-Americans on the team could also depart.

In 2026, Hamawy entered the Democratic primary for New Jersey's 12th congressional district to succeed Congresswoman Bonnie Watson Coleman after she announced her retirement. Hamawy won the primary, setting him up as the strong favorite to succeed Watson Coleman in the heavily Democratic district; he won the general election by 42.8 percentage points.

== Early life ==
Hamawy was born in Egypt and moved to Old Bridge Township, New Jersey, with his family when he was a baby. Raised in Old Bridge by Egyptian immigrant parents, he attended Rutgers University–New Brunswick for his undergraduate studies and New Jersey Medical School at the University of Medicine and Dentistry of New Jersey (now at Rutgers University, Newark). He completed his medical residency in general surgery at Weill Cornell Medicine and his fellowship in plastic surgery at University of Texas Southwestern Medical Center. In 2018, he obtained an MBA from Rutgers University–Camden.

== Medical career ==
=== Combat physician ===
Hamawy enlisted in the New Jersey National Guard and served eight years as a reconstructive surgeon, a general surgeon, and a flight surgeon in the Medical Corps during the Iraq War, including nine months in Baghdad at the 31st Combat Support Hospital with the U.S. Army. One of his patients was future U.S. Senator Tammy Duckworth, who credited him with helping save her life after her Blackhawk helicopter was shot down in 2004. Duckworth has said, "When I was wounded, within 20 minutes, I was in front of him—and he is the doctor who not only saved my life, but was able to prevent me from becoming a triple amputee by employing a vascular procedure that he'd just learned in medical school." The Combat Support Hospital treated an average of 15 traumas a day, but on the busiest days, such as during the Second Battle of Fallujah, they treated up to 40.

When Hamawy separated from the Army he had risen to the rank of lieutenant colonel. He has received a Meritorious Service Medal and three Army Commendation Medals.

=== Private medical practice ===
Since returning from military service, Hamawy has been a plastic surgeon in Princeton, New Jersey.

Hamawy was cited regarding a plastic surgery mobile game that appeared targeted at children, criticizing the game for its effect on their self-esteem and body dysphoria.

== Physician in disaster zones ==
=== September 11 attacks ===
Hamawy treated the wounded and first responders immediately after the September 11 attacks while completing his residency at NewYork-Presbyterian Hospital.

=== Gaza ===
In May 2024, Hamawy joined a volunteer international mission organized by the Palestinian-American Medical Association and the World Health Organization. The original plan was to spend two weeks working as part of a 20-person medical team of physicians at the Gaza European Hospital in Khan Younis. While there he performed 120 surgeries, more than half of them on children.

Israel seized and closed the Rafah border crossing shortly after his arrival, trapping the physicians in Gaza. The team was unable to leave at the end of its mission, and stayed an additional seven days. Senator Tammy Duckworth personally intervened to help 17 of the doctors leave by speaking to Israeli Ambassador to the United States Michael Herzog and delivering a letter that Hamawy had written to President Joe Biden. Hamawy refused to leave until the other members of the team from Jordan, Egypt, and Australia were also able to leave, saying: "When you go in as a team, you leave as a team. That's the right thing to do, and that's what was bred into us [in the Army]."

Hamawy told the New York Times after he returned, "Children who lost limbs and could not run or play specifically said they wished they had died, and some wanted to kill themselves." In an interview with NPR, he said: "Many of these patients die when they arrive to the hospital. The mortality rate is 80%. In our most recent war in Iraq and Afghanistan, the mortality rate was 10%." He said this was mainly due to lack of medication, personnel, and adequate resources. Hamawy said the European Hospital "was a completely benign civilian hospital with no tunnels underneath it". The Israeli Defense Force claimed that Hamas leader Muhammed Sinwar was killed on May 13, 2025, in a tunnel underneath the hospital.

U.S. Representative Bonnie Watson Coleman, who represents Princeton in Congress, said then that she was "deeply relieved" when he returned from Gaza. She later invited him as her guest at President Donald Trump's 2025 State of the Union.

In June 2024, Hamawy testified to a congressional briefing to describe his experience treating patients in Gaza.

=== Other disasters ===
Hamawy volunteered to provide medical services after the siege of Sarajevo, the 2010 Haitian earthquake, and the Syrian civil war.

== U.S. House of Representatives ==
=== 2026 congressional election ===
Hamawy entered the Democratic primary for New Jersey's 12th congressional district to succeed Bonnie Watson Coleman after she announced her retirement. He has been endorsed by U.S. Senators Tammy Duckworth and Bernie Sanders, U.S. Representatives Ro Khanna and Ilhan Omar, former Representative Jamaal Bowman, and former New Jersey General Assembly member Sadaf Jaffer. Hamawy has also been endorsed by numerous progressive organizations, including the Justice Democrats, Our Revolution, PAL PAC, and Track AIPAC.

In the first quarter of 2026, Hamawy announced that he had raised nearly $550,000, which the New Jersey Globe said would mean he "may be NJ-12's best-funded Democrat". According to a poll conducted by Workbench Strategy and funded by Hamawy, he was leading a "splintered field".

During the 2026 Democratic primary campaign, Hamawy's 1995 testimony as a defense witness in the trial of Omar Abdel-Rahman for conspiring to assassinate Egyptian President Hosni Mubarak received media attention after the Wall Street Journal published an opinion column by Michael Mukasey, the judge in the case, describing Hamawy's interactions with Abdel-Rahman. Hamawy was never charged or accused of any wrongdoing, and he characterized the renewed coverage as partisan "guilt-by-association" attacks.

American Priorities, a pro-Palestinian political action committee, spent more than $1.5 million on campaign ads that focus on his work as a physician with the U.S. Army, far outspending the other candidates in the race. The PAC spent $2 million supporting Hamawy in the race.

Hamawy won the Democratic primary on June 2, defeating 12 other candidates. This left him as the favorite to win the general election in the heavily Democratic district.

In September 2026, Hamawy attended a protest ahead of a speech by Israeli prime minister Benjamin Netanyahu at the United Nations General Assembly.

On November 3, Hamawy won the general election.

=== Tenure ===
Hamawy was one of seven representatives-elect that publicly announced they did not vote for Hakeem Jeffries in the Democratic nomination for Speaker of the House.

== Personal life ==
Hamawy is married, and as of 2025 he lives with his wife and their four children in the Monmouth Junction section of South Brunswick, New Jersey.

U.S. House of Representatives
Preceded by Bonnie Watson Coleman	Member of the U.S. House of Representatives from New Jersey's 12th congressional district Taking office 2027	Elect
