= American Priorities =

American pro-Palestine super PAC

- Formation: February 12, 2026; 9 months ago
- Type: Super PAC
- Registration no.: C00932723
- Headquarters: Wilmington, Delaware
- Region served: United States
- Treasurer: Mark Hanna
- Revenue: $7.73 million USD (January to September 2026)
- Website: americanprioritiespac.com

American Priorities is an American pro-Palestine super PAC. The group was founded in 2026 with the goal of countering the influence of the pro-Israel lobbying group AIPAC and supporting pro-Palestine candidates for Congress. The organization planned to spend over $10 million to support its preferred candidates during the 2026 election cycle.

== History and activities ==
American Priorities filed a statement of organization with the Federal Election Commission on February 12, 2026. The PAC pledged to spend over $10 million during the 2026 midterms. The PAC aims to counter the influence of AIPAC, a major pro-Israel lobbying group, and to make it safer for candidates to criticize Israel without fear of an AIPAC-backed challenger. Hannah Fertig, a former director of the group, stated that the group's goal was "to make sure that someone's there to protect candidates who question these [pro-Israel] policies."

=== 2026 election cycle ===
The PAC spent $8.15 million backing 15 candidates in the 2026 election cycle. The first races the PAC involved itself in were two Democratic primaries for seats in the United States House of Representatives. One, in North Carolina, was a primary between incumbent representative Valerie Foushee, who had previously received support from AIPAC (although she disavowed AIPAC in 2025), and challenger Nida Allam. The PAC spent about $1 million in support of Allam, who went on to lose to the incumbent by less than 1% in the election in her district. The other was the open primary for Texas's 30th congressional district, which was vacated by Jasmine Crockett, who was running in the 2026 Senate election in Texas. American Priorities spent $100,000 in support of Frederick Haynes III, who won his primary without any major opposition.

The PAC considered spending in support of pro-Palestine candidates in Illinois house races, but opted not to. Some candidates that American Priorities could have supported, like Junaid Ahmed in Illinois's 8th congressional district, lost their primaries. This led to criticism from pro-Palestine journalist Ryan Grim, who said that spending from the deep-pocketed group could have led to Ahmed (who lost to Melissa Bean, an AIPAC-backed candidate) winning the primary.

The PAC decided to spend around $2 million supporting Democrat Adam Hamawy in his primary campaign to win New Jersey's 12th congressional district, an open and heavily Democratic seat. The spending included $600,000 to air an ad highlighting Hamawy's time as a doctor during the Iraq War and Gaza War. Hamawy was also endorsed by other progressive organizations, including Justice Democrats, which had at one point donated to American Priorities. Hamawy outraised his opponents and won the Democratic primary to succeed the retiring representative, Bonnie Watson Coleman. The New Jersey Globe credited the spending from American Priorities with raising Hamawy's profile and establishing him as the frontrunner in the race. After Hamawy's victory, a senior strategist for Hamawy described the group's spending as "extremely helpful".

American Priorities spent over $400,000 supporting the campaign of Chris Rabb in Pennsylvania's 3rd congressional district. Rabb won the primary by over 10% over his closest rival.

In California, the group spent heavily in support of progressive Democrat Randy Villegas in his campaign to take on incumbent Republican representative David Valadao. Villegas was opposed in the nonpartisan primary by moderate Democrat Jasmeet Bains, who received support from the lobbying group Democratic Majority for Israel. Villegas won second place in the primary as Valadao placed first, earning a spot in the November general election and defeating Bains, who placed third.

In June, the group devoted $2 million to support a trio of Democratic candidates running in House of Representatives elections in New York. Primaries in New York were less than a month away. The New York candidates the group supported were all endorsed by New York City mayor Zohran Mamdani and included Brad Lander, who was mounting a primary challenge against incumbent representative Dan Goldman in the election in district 10; Darializa Avila Chevalier, who was mounting a primary challenge against incumbent representative Adriano Espaillat in the election in district 13; and Claire Valdez, running in the election in district 7, a seat which was open following the retirement of incumbent representative Nydia Velázquez. Goldman and Espaillat were both endorsed by AIPAC. The three candidates supported by American Priorities received criticism from their opponents for receiving support from the PAC, although all three claimed not to have any involvement with the group.

All three New York candidates supported by American Priorities won their primaries, including two who defeated AIPAC-backed incumbents. The group's aggressive spending in support of Avila Chevalier was described by some political operatives and by Justice Democrats with being a crucial component in her victory against Espaillat, the incumbent.

In Colorado, American Priorities supported Melat Kiros in her primary challenge against incumbent representative Diana DeGette. The group spent around $140,000 on TV ads. Drop Site News reported that the incumbent received outside support from a super PAC which received funding from the United Democracy Project, an AIPAC affiliate. Kiros won her primary, unseating the incumbent.

American Priorities spent in support of Abdul El-Sayed during the Democratic primary for the 2026 United States Senate election in Michigan. El-Sayed was opposed in the primary by Haley Stevens, who was heavily supported by AIPAC. El-Sayed went on to defeat Stevens.

In Minnesota, American Priorities spent over $50,000 in support of Peggy Flanagan, a Democratic candidate for U.S. Senate. Her opponent in the Democratic primary, U.S. Representative Angie Craig, was supported by AIPAC's donor network. Flanagan defeated Craig in the primary. In the House district Craig retired from to run for Senate, American Priorities supported Matt Little with around $60,000 in spending. One of Little's opponents, Matt Klein, was endorsed by Democratic Majority for Israel. Little won the primary.

American Priorities spent $200,000 in support of Aisha Wahab in the runoff for a special election for California's 14th congressional district. Wahab defeated fellow Democrat Melissa Hernandez, whose campaign received significant funding from AIPAC.

== Leadership ==
Hannah Fertig, a political strategist, formerly served as a director of American Priorities. Fertig previously worked on the Bernie Sanders 2020 presidential campaign and for the progressive organization Justice Democrats. Fertig is also a leader of Fighting for Michigan PAC, which supports Abdul El-Sayed's candidacy for U.S. Senate. The treasurer of the group is Mark Hanna, a district leader in the Brooklyn Democratic Party who had previously supported the mayoral campaign of Zohran Mamdani and served on the board of Yalla Brooklyn, another progressive organization.

== Fundraising ==
American Priorities has raised significantly more money than other comparable pro-Palestine lobbying groups, like PAL PAC and Citizens Against AIPAC Corruption. Jewish Insider reported that the group's donors included former AppLovin executives, the founder of Outschool, and other wealthy businesspeople who generally made their money in the technology sector. Many donors to American Priorities had previously financially supported Zohran Mamdani. The progressive organization Justice Democrats also donated to the PAC. American Priorities planned to spend over $10 million during the 2026 election cycle.
