= Zack Mullock =

American politician (born 1985)

- Mullock in 2026

Member-elect of the U.S. House of Representatives from New Jersey's 2nd district
- Assuming office January 3, 2027
- Succeeding: Jeff Van Drew

Mayor of Cape May, New Jersey
- Incumbent
- Assumed office January 1, 2021
- Preceded by: Chuck Lear

Personal details
- Born: October 23, 1985 (age 41) Cape May, New Jersey, U.S.
- Party: Democratic
- Spouse: Justine Mullock (m. 2013)
- Children: 3
- Education: Mount St. Mary's University (BA); Saint Joseph's University (MBA)

Zachary Mullock (born October 23, 1985) is an American politician who is the U.S. representative-elect for New Jersey's 2nd congressional district. He is currently serving his second term as Mayor of Cape May, New Jersey, since 2021, and is a member of the Democratic Party.

== Early life and education ==
Mullock has a bachelor's degree from Mount Saint Mary's University and a Master of Business Administration from Saint Joseph's University. He married Justine Mullock in 2013.

== Political career ==
In November 2020, Mullock defeated incumbent Cape May Mayor Chuck Lear. He took office as the town's mayor on January 1, 2021. As mayor, Mullock oversaw the construction of a new firehouse, library, community center, theater, and police station.

Mullock ran for the United States House of Representatives for New Jersey's 2nd congressional district in the 2026 elections. Endorsed by the Blue Dog PAC, he defeated Republican incumbent Jeff Van Drew. His victory was an upset, and Mullock said he was "shocked" by it.

U.S. House of Representatives
Preceded by Jeff Van Drew	Member of the U.S. House of Representatives from New Jersey's 2nd congressional district Taking office 2027	Elect
