= Rebecca Bennett (politician) =

American politician (born 1987)

- Bennett in 2026

Member-elect of the U.S. House of Representatives from New Jersey's 7th district
- Assuming office January 3, 2027
- Succeeding: Thomas Kean Jr.

Personal details
- Born: March 13, 1987 (age 39) Granbury, Texas, U.S.
- Party: Democratic (2016–present)
- Other political affiliations: Republican (before 2016)
- Spouse: Alex
- Children: 2
- Education: Cornell University (BS); University of Pennsylvania (MBA)
- Website: Campaign website

Military service
- Branch/service: United States Navy (2009–2019); United States Air Force (2022–present)
- Unit: Naval Aviator (2009–2019); Air National Guard (2022–present)
- Battles/wars: War in Afghanistan

Rebecca Bennett (born March 13, 1987) is an American healthcare executive and former Navy helicopter pilot who is the U.S. representative-elect for New Jersey's 7th congressional district. A member of the Democratic Party, Bennett defeated Republican incumbent Thomas Kean Jr. in the 2026 election.

== Early life and education ==
Rebecca Bennett was born on March 13, 1987, and was raised by a conservative family in Granbury, Texas. She attended the Texas Academy of Mathematics and Science before studying chemical engineering at Cornell University, graduating in 2009. She later earned a Master of Business Administration from the University of Pennsylvania's Wharton School.

== Career ==
=== Military ===
Bennett preparing an MH-60S Seahawk helicopter during RIMPAC in 2014

After graduating from Cornell in 2009, Bennett joined the United States Navy, where she became a naval aviator. She later trained at the United States Naval Test Pilot School, becoming the 18th female test pilot in the U.S. Navy.

Bennett was deployed to the Middle East during the war in Afghanistan, serving in a carrier strike group. After moving to New Jersey in 2019, Bennett retired from active duty and joined the reserves. In 2022, she joined the Air National Guard.

=== Healthcare ===
After relocating to New Jersey, Bennett began working in healthcare. She has also worked for Noom, Midi Health, and Johnson & Johnson. In 2024, Bennett was listed on Inc. magazine's Best in Business program, and in October that year, she was named vice president for strategic partnerships and network operations at Oshi Health.

=== Political career ===
In February 2025, Bennett announced she would seek the Democratic nomination for New Jersey's 7th congressional district in the 2026 election. She won the June 2, 2026, primary election. Alongside JoAnna Mendoza, Cait Conley, and Maura Sullivan, she is a member of the Hell Cats, a group of Democratic female veterans who ran in competitive districts in 2026.

Bennett named New Jersey governor Mikie Sherrill, who is also former U.S. Navy helicopter pilot, as her motivation to run for public office. She has described herself as a moderate Democrat. She won the November 3, 2026 general election.

== Personal life ==
Bennett lives in Bridgewater Township, New Jersey, with her husband, Alex, and their two daughters.

== Electoral history ==
=== 2026 ===
2026 New Jersey's 7th congressional district election
Primary election
Party	Candidate	Votes	%
Democratic	Rebecca Bennett	27,525	45.32
Democratic	Tina Shah	12,146	20.00
Democratic	Brian Varela	11,614	19.12
Democratic	Michael Roth	9,452	15.56
Total votes		60,737	100.00
General election
Democratic	Rebecca Bennett		
Republican	Thomas Kean Jr. (incumbent)		
Stop Israel's Genocide	Seamus Patrick O'Toole		
Total votes			100.00

U.S. House of Representatives
Preceded by Thomas Kean Jr.	Member of the U.S. House of Representatives from New Jersey's 7th congressional district Taking office 2027	Elect
