= JoAnna Mendoza =

American politician

- Mendoza in 2026

Member-elect of the U.S. House of Representatives from Arizona's 6th district
- Assuming office January 3, 2027
- Succeeding: Juan Ciscomani

Personal details
- Born: 1975 or 1976 (age 50–51) Eloy, Arizona, U.S.
- Party: Democratic (2018–present)
- Other political affiliations: Republican (before 2018)
- Children: 1
- Education: American Military University (BA); Grand Canyon University (MS)
- Website: Campaign website

Military service
- Branch/service: United States Navy (1994–1997); United States Marine Corps (1998–2016)
- Battles/wars: Iraq War; War in Afghanistan

JoAnna H. Mendoza (born 1975 or 1976) is an American politician and military veteran who is the U.S. representative-elect for Arizona's 6th congressional district. A member of the Democratic Party. Mendoza beat incumbent Republican Juan Ciscomani in the 2026 election.

Mendoza served in the United States Navy from 1994 to 1997. She later joined the Marine Corps, completing two tours in Iraq and one in Afghanistan before leaving active duty service in 2016. She is the first female Marine elected to Congress.

== Early life and education ==
JoAnna H. Mendoza was born in Eloy, Arizona, in 1975 or 1976, the oldest of five children in a Catholic family. At eight years old, Mendoza began working as a cotton picker with her parents, both Mexican immigrants.

In 2013, Mendoza graduated from the American Military University with a Bachelor of Arts in intelligence studies. She attained a Master of Science in Leadership from Grand Canyon University in 2019.

== Military career ==
Mendoza while conducting military physical training in 2013

Mendoza joined the military at age 17, serving in the United States Navy, where she worked as a boiler tech on the USS Samuel Gompers from 1994 to 1997.

The following year, she joined the Marine Corps, where she was a gunnery sergeant and drill instructor until 2016.

In the Marine Corps, Mendoza led combat tours during both the Iraq War and the War in Afghanistan. She was deployed twice to Iraq and once to Afghanistan.

== Professional career ==
After retiring from the Marine Corps, Mendoza was appointed as a governing board member of her local school district in Red Rock. She worked as the veteran services representative in the office of U.S. representative Tom O'Halleran from May 2018 to July 2019, when she became veteran outreach coordinator at Pima Community College.

In 2020, Mendoza ran to represent Arizona's 11th state senate district as a Democrat. She lost to incumbent Republican Vince Leach in the general election, receiving 45.6% of the vote.

Mendoza rejoined O'Halleran's campaign staff in January 2021, working as deputy district director for a year before becoming his campaign manager. After O'Halleran lost re-election in 2022, Mendoza worked as the executive director for the Arizona Center for Economic Progress, an economic think tank. She also served as executive director of veterans organization Vets Forward.

== 2026 congressional campaign ==
Mendoza was the Democratic nominee in the 2026 election for Arizona's 6th congressional district. The district, represented by Republican Juan Ciscomani, was viewed as a competitive toss-up. She was endorsed by the Blue Dog PAC.

In the first quarter of 2026, Mendoza's campaign raised US$2.3 million. Arizona Public Media described Mendoza as a "prolific fundraiser". She won the November 3, 2026, election, making her the first female Marine elected to Congress.

== Political views ==
Mendoza is a former Republican, but voted for Hillary Clinton in the 2016 presidential election.

== Personal life ==
A single queer mother, Mendoza lives in Red Rock with her son, Aidan. Mendoza was raised as a Catholic, but is no longer practicing.

Alongside Rebecca Bennett, Cait Conley, and Maura Sullivan, she is a member of the Hell Cats, a group of Democratic female veterans who ran in competitive districts in 2026, all of whom except Sullivan ended up winning.

U.S. House of Representatives
| Preceded by Juan Ciscomani | Member of the U.S. House of Representatives from Arizona's 6th congressional district Taking office 2027 | Elect |
