= Heather H. Howard =

Heather H. Howard is an American health policy expert and former associate director of the Domestic Policy Council during the Clinton administration. She is a councilwoman for Princeton, New Jersey municipality, and the program director for the State Health Reform Assistance Network, which is housed in Princeton University's Woodrow Wilson School and supported by the Robert Wood Johnson Foundation. She also serves as a lecturer in public affairs at the Princeton School of Public and International Affairs, and a faculty affiliate at the Center for Health and Wellbeing.

== Education ==
Howard earned her J.D. cum laude from New York University School of Law and has a B.A. cum laude in History and Spanish from Duke University.

== State and federal positions ==
In 1990, Howard joined the legislative staff of Congresswoman Nita Lowey. In 1997 she became a judicial clerk in the United States Court of Appeals for the Sixth Circuit, and a year later worked as a trial attorney for the United States Department of Justice. In 2000 she moved to the White House where she served President Bill Clinton on the Domestic Policy Council, and as Senior Policy Adviser to First Lady Hillary Clinton.

Howard served for two years as policy counsel for New Jersey Governor Jon S. Corzine, and as his chief of staff while he was a U.S. Senator. In 2008 she became the 14th Commissioner of the New Jersey Department of Health and Senior Services. Howard worked to strengthen the state's health care delivery system and improve maternal and child health. Following the change in partisan control in the New Jersey governor's seat in early 2010, Howard was replaced as Commissioner by Dr. Poonam Alaigh.

== Election to Princeton council ==
In November 2011, Howard was elected to serve on the Borough Council of Princeton Borough. Due to the consolidation of the former Borough with Princeton Township into a new single municipality, her term was shortened to a single year. She later ran for a seat on the council for the united Princeton. She received the endorsement of the Princeton Community Democratic Organization in March 2012. In November 2012 she was elected to the serve on one of the six counsel seats of the new municipality.
