= Carlos Brody =

Mexican neuroscientist

Carlos D. Brody is a Mexican neuroscientist who is currently the Wilbur H. Gantz III '59 Professor in Neuroscience at Princeton University and is an Investigator of the Howard Hughes Medical Institute. A cited expert in his field, his interests include systems neuroscience.

== Education ==
He earned his BA in physics from Oxford University and his PhD in Computation and Neural Systems at California Institute of Technology in 1997. He started as an assistant professor at the Cold Spring Harbor Laboratory.

== Selected publications ==
- Miller KJ, Botvinick MM, Brody CD. Dorsal hippocampus contributes to model-based planning. Nat Neurosci. 2017
- Piet AT, Erlich JC, Kopec CD, Brody CD. Rat Prefrontal Cortex Inactivations during Decision Making Are Explained by Bistable Attractor Dynamics. Neural Comput. 2017; :1-26
- Brody CD, Hanks TD. Neural underpinnings of the evidence accumulator. Curr Opin Neurobiol. 2016; 37:149-57
- Kopec CD, Erlich JC, Brunton BW, Deisseroth K, Brody CD. Cortical and Subcortical Contributions to Short-Term Memory for Orienting Movements. Neuron. 2015; 88 (2):367-77
- Duan CA, Erlich JC, Brody CD. Requirement of Prefrontal and Midbrain Regions for Rapid Executive Control of Behavior in the Rat. Neuron. 2015; 86 (6):1491-503
- Scott BB, Constantinople CM, Erlich JC, Tank DW, Brody CD. Sources of noise during accumulation of evidence in unrestrained and voluntarily head-restrained rats. Elife. 2015;4:e11308
