= PAL PAC =

American political action committee

- Peace, Accountability, and Leadership PAC
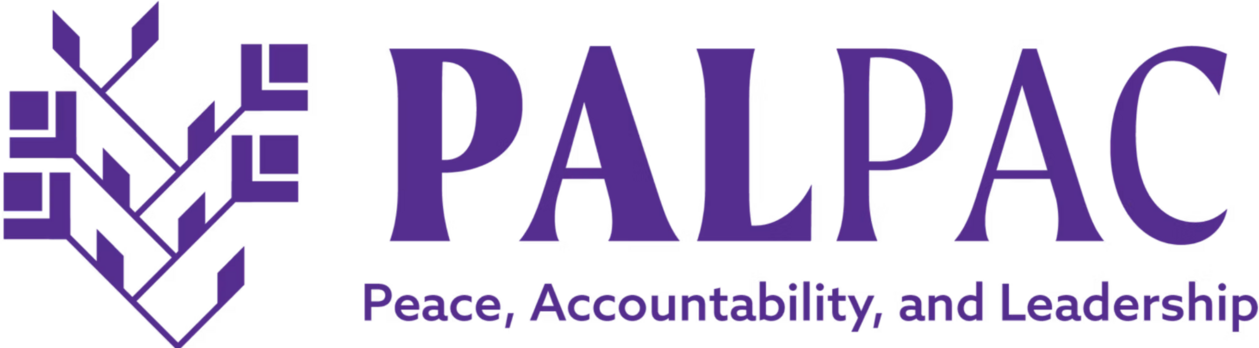
- Formation: February 11, 2026; 9 months ago
- Founder: Margaret DeReus
- Type: Political action committee
- Website: pal.vote

The Peace, Accountability, and Leadership PAC (PAL PAC) is an American pro-Palestine political action committee. It was founded ahead of the 2026 United States elections and supports officials who are in support of Palestinian civil rights. It has been described as an alternative to the pro-Israel lobby group AIPAC. The group has worked with other pro-Palestine PACs, including Citizens Against AIPAC Corruption and American Priorities.

== History ==
PAL PAC was founded on February 11, 2026, by Margaret DeReus. DeReus is the executive director of the Institute for Middle East Understanding (IMEU).

At its launch announcement, PAL PAC endorsed four candidates running for the United States House of Representatives. The candidates included Summer Lee, Ilhan Omar, Delia Ramirez, and Rashida Tlaib. Following their endorsement of her, Tlaib stated that the organization has her full support. The following day, PAL PAC issued an endorsement of Kat Abughazaleh, a Democratic candidate in Illinois's 9th congressional district. DeReus praised Abughazaleh for her position on Palestinian rights.

The PAC spent $2.15 million in the 2026 election cycle.
