= 2026 Colorado's 1st congressional district election =

- November 3, 2026

Colorado's 1st congressional district
- Reporting: 98% as of Nov. 9, 7:14 PM MST
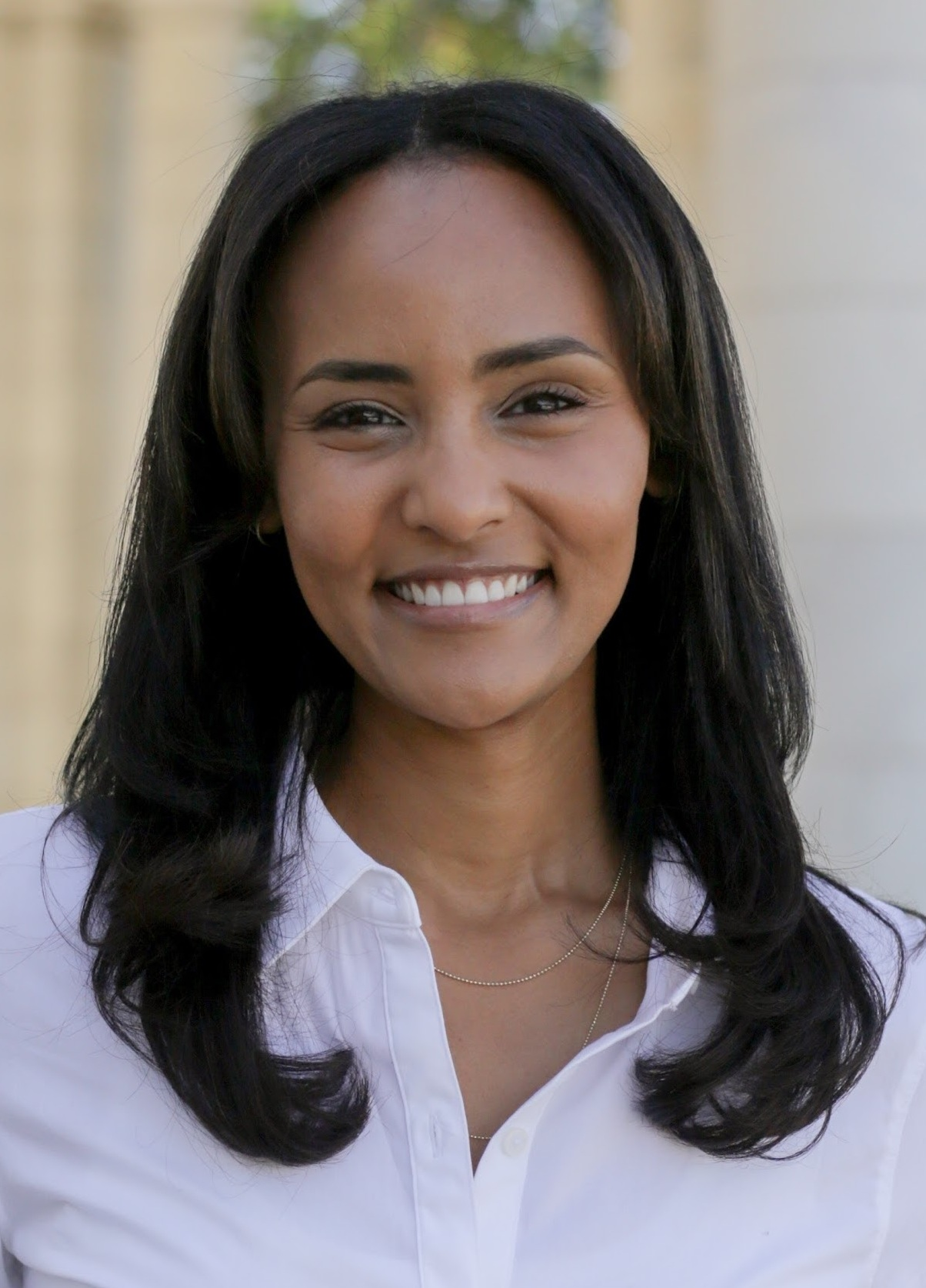

Nominee	Melat Kiros	Christy Peterson	Shimon Blau
Party	Democratic	Republican	Independent
Popular vote	238,117	42,939	16,607
Percentage	78.3%	14.1%	5.5%
- County results Kiros: 70–80%
U.S. Representative before election
Diana DeGette
Democratic
Elected U.S. Representative
Melat Kiros
Democratic

The 2026 Colorado's 1st congressional district election was held on November 3, 2026, to elect a member of the United States House of Representatives to represent Colorado's 1st congressional district.

Primary elections were held on June 30, 2026. Democratic socialist and former attorney Melat Kiros won the Democratic nomination over incumbent Diana DeGette, who had held the seat since 1997. Christy Peterson was unopposed in the Republican nomination.

A Republican has not held Colorado's 1st congressional district seat since 1973.

== Background ==
Colorado's 1st congressional district is a deeply blue urban district that is primarily based in the City and County of Denver and is the most Democratic district in both Colorado and the Mountain West. The incumbent was Democrat Diana DeGette, a 15-term congresswoman and dean of Colorado's congressional delegation. The Democratic primary has long been the real contest in this district. Only two Republicans have represented it since 1933, and the seat has been in Democratic hands since 1973. No Republican has received more than 30% of the vote since 1998.

The 2026 primary election cycle saw a string of victories by progressive candidates running on platforms including support for Medicare for All, economic populism, and opposition to Israel. Israel has emerged as a major point of contention in Democratic primaries, with progressive candidates largely opposing military aid to Israel and calling Israel's actions in Gaza a genocide.

On June 23, one week before Colorado's primary election, democratic socialist candidates were extremely successful in New York, with 9 out of 10 New York City Democratic Socialists of America candidates winning their primaries. Among these victories were Claire Valdez, who won an open primary to replace retiring incumbent Nydia Velázquez, and Darializa Avila Chevalier, who scored an upset victory against incumbent Adriano Espaillat. A third progressive candidate not backed by the DSA, Brad Lander, additionally defeated incumbent Dan Goldman in his primary.

=== Primary candidates ===
==== Diana DeGette ====
At the time of the election, DeGette was the incumbent U.S. Representative from Colorado's 1st congressional district. DeGette was first elected to the seat in 1996, replacing longtime representative Pat Schroeder after she declined to run for re-election. Following her first election, only one primary or general election challenger received over 30% of the vote against DeGette. Her most serious primary challenge came in 2018, when political activist Saira Rao received 32% of the vote.

During her tenure, DeGette served as a chief deputy whip from 2005 to 2019 and was the dean of Colorado's congressional delegation since 2007. She previously served in the Colorado House of Representatives from 1993 to 1996.

==== Melat Kiros ====
Before running for Congress, Kiros had previously worked as an associate at the law firm Sidley Austin. In November 2023, Kiros was fired from her position after writing a Medium post publicly criticizing the firm's stance on the Israel-Gaza War. Following her firing, Kiros returned to Denver to pursue a doctorate in public policy at the University of Colorado Denver and worked as a barista. Kiros announced her campaign for Congress in July 2025, arguing for generational change and younger representation within congress.

==== Wanda James ====
At the time of the election, James was serving as a member University of Colorado Board of Regents, representing the 1st Congressional district. She had previously managed Jared Polis's 2008 Congressional campaign and served on his gubernatorial transition team in 2019. James announced her campaign in September 2025, citing DeGette's long tenure in Congress and her experience as an elected official as reasons for her run.

== Primary election ==
=== Primary campaign ===
To qualify for the June primary ballot, candidates could either collect petition signatures or receive at least 30% of votes at a county caucus. DeGette narrowly qualified for the ballot after securing 33% of the vote to Kiros's 67%. James qualified for the ballot via petition.

Similar to other Democratic primary campaigns during the 2026 cycle, the candidates' stance on Israel was a major point of contention. During the campaign, Kiros stated that she would not support providing offensive or defensive weapons for Israel, including funding for the Iron Dome. DeGette supported a prohibition on offensive weapons but not defensive weapons. Additionally, while DeGette supported a two-state solution, Kiros described Israel as an ethnocracy and called for it to no longer be a Jewish state.

Kiros additionally criticized DeGette for her acceptance of campaign contributions from corporations.

=== Primary endorsements ===
Kiros's first major endorsement came in December 2025 when she was endorsed by the Justice Democrats, an organization which had supported previous successful primary challenges to incumbent Democrats including the 2018 victory of Alexandria Ocasio-Cortez over incumbent Joe Crowley. In February 2026, Kiros was endorsed by the Denver Democratic Socialists of America chapter. Kiros was additionally endorsed by progressive organizations including Our Revolution, Sunrise Movement, and Working Families Party, as well as senator Bernie Sanders.

DeGette was endorsed by the sitting Democratic representatives from Colorado, Joe Neguse, Jason Crow, and Brittany Pettersen. DeGette was additionally endorsed by the Congressional Progressive Caucus and multiple labor unions.

James received less support from notable individuals or organizations. Among her supporters were current and former elected officials, including Ken Salazar, former U.S. ambassador to Mexico and U.S. senator from Colorado.

Diana DeGette

U.S. representatives

- Jason Crow, CO-6 (2019–present)
- Joe Neguse, CO-02 (2019–present)
- Brittany Pettersen, CO-7 (2023–present)

Labor unions

- Colorado AFL-CIO
- SEIU Colorado

Organizations

- Advocates for Trans Equality
- CHC BOLD PAC
- Congressional Progressive Caucus PAC
- Feminist Majority PAC
- Humane World Action Fund
- J Street
- Joint Action Committee for Political Affairs
- League of Conservation Voters Action Fund
- National Organization for Women
- Planned Parenthood Action Fund
- Population Connection
- Reproductive Freedom for All
Wanda James

Executive branch officials

- Ken Salazar, former U.S. ambassador to Mexico (2021–2025) and U.S. senator from Colorado (2005–2009)

State legislators

- Terrance Carroll, former speaker of the Colorado House (2009–2011) from the 7th district (2003-2011)

Local officials

- Wellington Webb, former mayor of Denver (1991–2003)
Melat Kiros

U.S. senators

- Bernie Sanders, Vermont (2007–present) (Independent)

State legislators

- Javier Mabrey, state representative from the 1st district (2023–present)
- Chris Rabb, state representative from Pennsylvania's 200th district (2017–present)
- Yara Zokaie, state representative from the 52nd district (2025–present)

Labor unions

- UFCW Local 7

Organizations

- American Priorities
- A New Policy PAC
- Democratic Socialists of America
- Denver Democratic Socialists of America
- Jewish Voice for Peace Action
- Justice Democrats
- New American Leaders Action Fund
- Our Revolution
- PAL PAC
- Peace Action
- Track AIPAC
- Sunrise Movement

Political parties

- Colorado Working Families Party

=== Primary election forum ===
On June 20, the three primary challengers took part in a forum moderated by Colorado Politics. DeGette had previously faced criticism for skipping multiple forums and interviews, including a one-on-one interview with KUSA that Kiros and James had both completed.

=== Fundraising ===
The race saw high amounts of outside spending, primarily against Kiros. In the last two months of the primary election, three super PACs from unknown sources spent $1.3 million on advertisements attacking Kiros. Kiros was supported by the Justice Democrats, which spent $200,000 on digital ads.

Campaign finance reports as of June 10, 2026
Candidate	Raised	Spent	Cash on hand
Diana DeGette (D)	$1,424,135	$1,234,561	$459,044
Wanda James (D)	$291,478	$265,717	$25,761
Melat Kiros (D)	$660,193	$571,771	$88,422
Source: Federal Election Commission

==== Polling ====
An internal poll from March saw a large lead for DeGette, who led Kiros 40% to 7%. By June, that gap had narrowed significantly, when a Data for Progress poll showed Kiros leading DeGette 41% to 36%. Both polls were sponsored by the Justice Democrats and the latter also by American Priorities, who both supported Kiros's campaign.

=== Results ===
Democratic primary results by precinct (Note: Arapahoe County precinct results unavailable as of July 18, 2026; they are shaded by county-wide vote.) Kiros: 40–50%; 50–60%; 60–70%; 70–80%; 80–90%; DeGette: 40–50%; 50–60%; 60–70%; 70–80%; Tie: 40–50%

On June 30, 2026, Kiros defeated DeGette in a political upset. Kiros would be the first Generation Z woman elected to Congress and the second Generation Z Congress member after Maxwell Frost.

Democratic primary results
Party	Candidate	Votes	%
Democratic	Melat Kiros	83,855	53.2
Democratic	Diana DeGette (incumbent)	62,715	39.8
Democratic	Wanda James	11,075	7.0
Total votes		157,645	100.0

== General election ==
Kiros faced Republican Christy Peterson in the November 3 general election. The 1st district is overwhelmingly Democratic, making a primary victory tantamount to election. Independent Shimon Blau, a medical doctor who criticized Kiros' comments on Israel, filed to run in the general election on the last day of candidate filing.

=== Predictions ===
Source	Ranking	As of
Decision Desk HQ	Safe D	July 14, 2026
The Cook Political Report	Solid D	February 6, 2025
Inside Elections	Solid D	March 7, 2025
Sabato's Crystal Ball	Safe D	April 10, 2025
The Economist	Safe D	May 6, 2026

=== Post-primary endorsements ===
Melat Kiros (D)

U.S. representatives

- Greg Casar, TX-35 (2023–present) and chair of the Congressional Progressive Caucus
- Maxwell Frost, FL-10 (2023–present)
- Pramila Jayapal, WA-7 (2017–present)

Labor unions

- American Federation of Government Employees
- SEIU Colorado

Organizations

- Congressional Progressive Caucus PAC
- End Citizens United
- Progressive Democrats of America

=== Fundraising ===
Campaign finance reports as of September 30, 2026
Candidate	Raised	Spent	Cash on hand
Melat Kiros	$1,285,740	$1,188,771	$96,969
Christy Peterson	$7,185	$1,540	$5,645
Source: Federal Election Commission

=== Results ===
2026 Colorado's 1st congressional district election
Party	Candidate	Votes	%	±%
Democratic	Melat Kiros	238,117	78.3%	+1.8
Republican	Christy Peterson	42,939	14.1%	–7.5
Independent	Shimon Blau	16,607	5.5%	N/A
Libertarian	Chad Humphrey	5,154	1.7%	N/A
Unity	Critter Milton	1,132	0.4%	–0.8
Total votes		303,949	100.0%	
Democratic hold				
