= 2026 United States House of Representatives elections in Colorado =

- November 3, 2026

All 8 Colorado seats to the United States House of Representatives
- Reporting: 98.9% as of 13 November 2026, 2:22 PM MST
	Majority party	Minority party
Party	Democratic	Republican
Last election	4	4
Seats after	7	1
Seat change	▲3	▼3
Popular vote	1,588,704	959,686
Percentage	60.07%	36.28%
Swing	▲5.79%	▼6.24%

Democratic hold Democratic gain
Republican hold
Democratic
40–50%
50–60%
60–70%
70–80%
80–90%
Republican
40–50%
50–60%
60–70%
70–80%
80–90%

The 2026 United States House of Representatives elections in Colorado were held on November 3, 2026, to elect the eight U.S. representatives from the State of Colorado, one from each of the state's congressional districts. The elections coincided with other elections to the House of Representatives, elections to the United States Senate, and various state and local elections. The primary elections took place on June 30, 2026.

== District 1 ==
2026 Colorado's 1st congressional district election
- Reporting: 99% as of Nov 16 at 1:00 AM MST
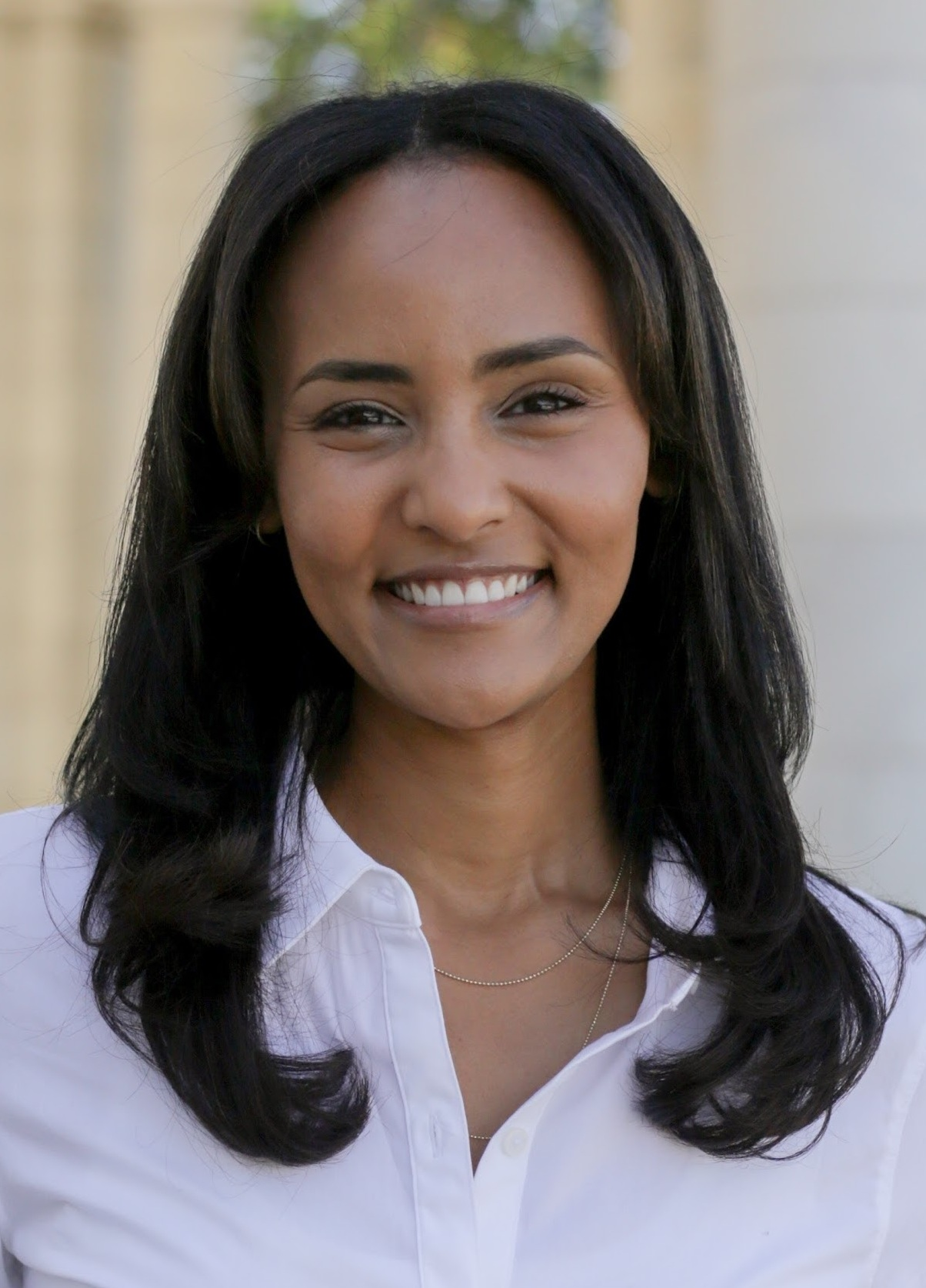

Nominee	Melat Kiros	Christy Peterson	Shimon Blau
Party	Democratic	Republican	Independent
Popular vote	239,082	43,070	16,650
Percentage	78.4%	14.1%	5.5%
- Kiros: 70–80%
U.S. representative before election
Diana DeGette
Democratic
Elected U.S. representative
Melat Kiros
Democratic

The 1st district includes almost all of Denver, as well as the enclaves of Glendale and Holly Hills. The incumbent is Democrat Diana DeGette, who was re-elected with 76.6% of the vote in 2024.

=== Democratic primary ===
==== Nominee ====
- Melat Kiros, graduate student and former attorney

==== Eliminated in primary ====
- Diana DeGette, incumbent U.S. representative
- Wanda James, member of the University of Colorado Board of Regents from the 1st district (2023–present)

==== Withdrawn ====
- Carter Hanson, substitute teacher
- Olivia Miller
- Christopher Oldfield
- Santiago Palomino, teacher
- Tiffany Rodgers, medical office manager

==== Endorsements ====
Diana DeGette

U.S. representatives

- Greg Casar, TX-35 (2023–present)
- Jason Crow, CO-6 (2019–present)
- Maxwell Frost, FL-10 (2023–present)
- Pramila Jayapal, WA-07 (2017–present)
- Joe Neguse, CO-02 (2019–present)
- Brittany Pettersen, CO-7 (2023–present)

Labor unions

- American Federation of Government Employees
- Colorado AFL-CIO
- SEIU Colorado

Organizations

- Advocates for Trans Equality
- CHC BOLD PAC
- Congressional Progressive Caucus PAC
- Feminist Majority PAC
- Humane World Action Fund
- J Street
- Joint Action Committee for Political Affairs
- League of Conservation Voters Action Fund
- National Organization for Women
- Planned Parenthood Action Fund
- Population Connection
- Reproductive Freedom for All
Wanda James

Executive branch officials

- Ken Salazar, former ambassador to Mexico (2021–2025)

State legislators

- Terrance Carroll, former speaker of the Colorado House (2009–2011) from HD-07 (2003–2011)

Local officials

- Wellington Webb, former mayor of Denver (1991–2003)
Melat Kiros

U.S. senators

- Bernie Sanders, Vermont (2007–present) (Independent)

State legislators

- Iman Jodeh, SD-29 (2025–present)
- Cathy Kipp, president pro tempore of the Colorado State Senate (2026-present) from the SD-14 (2025–present)
- Javier Mabrey, HD-01 (2023–present)
- Kenny Nguyen, HD-33 (2026–present)
- Chris Rabb, Pennsylvania's HD-200 (2017–present) and 2026 Democratic nominee for PA-03
- Brianna Titone, HD-29 (2019–present)
- Yara Zokaie, HD-52 (2025–present)

Labor unions

- National Education Association
- UFCW Local 7

Organizations

- American Priorities
- A New Policy PAC
- Democratic Socialists of America
- Denver Democratic Socialists of America
- Jewish Voice for Peace Action
- Justice Democrats
- New American Leaders Action Fund
- Our Revolution
- PAL PAC
- Peace Action
- Sunrise Movement
- Track AIPAC
- Track Oil PACs

Political parties

- Colorado Working Families Party

==== Fundraising ====
Italics indicate a withdrawn candidate.

Campaign finance reports as of June 10, 2026
Candidate	Raised	Spent	Cash on hand
Diana DeGette (D)	$1,424,135	$1,234,561	$459,044
Wanda James (D)	$291,478	$265,717	$25,761
Melat Kiros (D)	$660,193	$571,771	$88,422
Santiago Palomino (D)	$6,637	$593	$2,810
Source: Federal Election Commission

==== Results ====
Democratic primary results by precinct (Note: Arapahoe County precinct results unavailable as of July 18, 2026; they are shaded by county-wide vote.) Kiros: 40–50%; 50–60%; 60–70%; 70–80%; 80–90%; DeGette: 40–50%; 50–60%; 60–70%; 70–80%; Tie: 40–50%

Democratic primary results
Party	Candidate	Votes	%
Democratic	Melat Kiros	83,855	53.2
Democratic	Diana DeGette (incumbent)	62,715	39.8
Democratic	Wanda James	11,075	7.0
Total votes		157,645	100.0

=== Republican primary ===
==== Nominee ====
- Christy Peterson, office manager

==== Results ====
Republican primary results
Party	Candidate	Votes	%
Republican	Christy Peterson	15,010	100.0
Total votes		15,010	100.0

=== Independents ===
==== Filed paperwork ====
- Shimon Blau, medical doctor

=== General election ===
==== Predictions ====
Source	Ranking	As of
Decision Desk HQ	Safe D	July 14, 2026
The Cook Political Report	Solid D	February 6, 2025
Inside Elections	Solid D	March 7, 2025
Sabato's Crystal Ball	Safe D	April 10, 2025
The Economist	Safe D	May 6, 2026

==== Post-primary endorsements ====
Melat Kiros (D)

U.S. representatives

- Greg Casar, TX-35 (2023–present) and chair of the Congressional Progressive Caucus
- Maxwell Frost, FL-10 (2023–present)
- Pramila Jayapal, WA-7 (2017–present)

Labor unions

- American Federation of Government Employees
- SEIU Colorado

Organizations

- Congressional Progressive Caucus PAC
- End Citizens United
- Progressive Democrats of America

==== Fundraising ====
Campaign finance reports as of September 30, 2026
Candidate	Raised	Spent	Cash on hand
Melat Kiros	$1,285,740	$1,188,771	$96,969
Christy Peterson	$7,185	$1,540	$5,645
Source: Federal Election Commission

==== Results ====
2026 Colorado's 1st congressional district election
Party	Candidate	Votes	%	±%
Independent	Shimon Blau			
Libertarian	Chad Humphrey			
Democratic	Melat Kiros			
Unity	Critter Milton			
Republican	Christy Peterson			
Total votes				

== District 2 ==
2026 Colorado's 2nd congressional district election
- Reporting: 97% as of Nov 9 at 10:32 AM MST
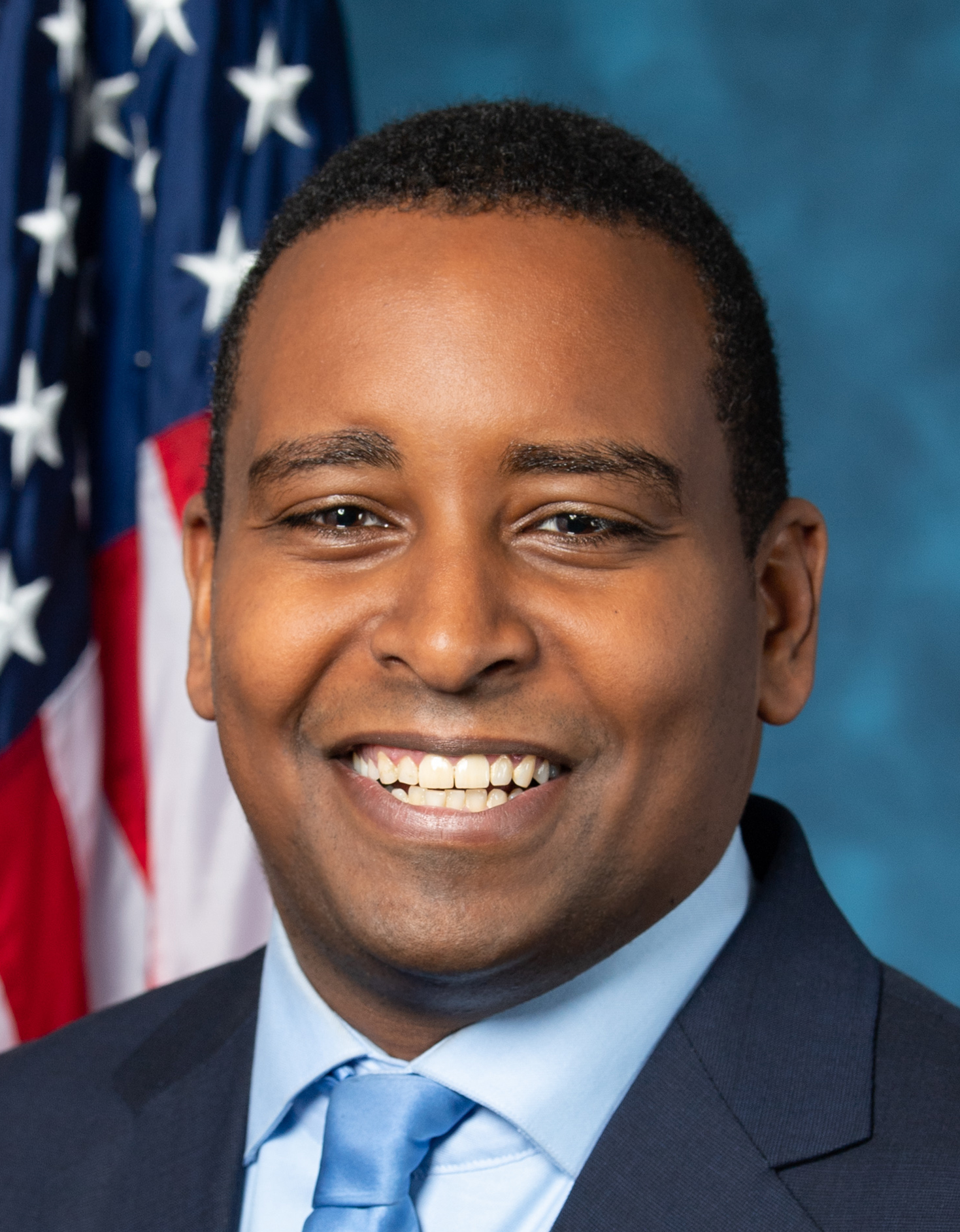

Nominee	Joe Neguse	Kelley Dennison
Party	Democratic	Republican
Popular vote	273,365	86,414
Percentage	74.5%	23.6%
- Neguse: 50–60% 60–70% 70–80% 80–90% Dennison: 70–80%
U.S. Representative before election
Joe Neguse
Democratic
Elected U.S. Representative
Joe Neguse
Democratic

The 2nd district is located in north-central Colorado, including the northwestern Denver suburbs, such as Boulder and Fort Collins. The incumbent is Democrat Joe Neguse, who was re-elected with 68.4% of the vote in 2024.

=== Democratic primary ===
==== Nominee ====
- Joe Neguse, incumbent U.S. Representative

Withdrawn

- Cinque Mason

==== Endorsements ====
Joe Neguse

U.S. representatives

- Gabby Giffords, former AZ-08 (2007–2012)
- Seth Moulton, MA-06 (2015–present)

Organizations

- AIPAC
- Feminist Majority PAC
- Giffords
- Humane World Action Fund
- Jewish Democratic Council of America
- Joint Action Committee for Political Affairs
- J Street
- League of Conservation Voters Action Fund
- Planned Parenthood Action Fund
- Population Connection
- Progressive Democrats of America
- Reproductive Freedom for All

==== Fundraising ====
Campaign finance reports as of June 10, 2026
Candidate	Raised	Spent	Cash on hand
Joe Neguse (D)	$2,585,391	$1,603,820	$2,972,469
Source: Federal Election Commission

==== Results ====
Democratic primary results
Party	Candidate	Votes	%
Democratic	Joe Neguse (incumbent)	136,146	100.0
Total votes		136,146	100.0

=== Republican primary ===
==== Nominee ====
- Kelley Dennison, business owner and licensed massage therapist

==== Eliminated in primary ====
- Christina Blunt, business owner

==== Endorsements ====
Kelley Dennison

Individuals

- Daniel Frick, Republican nominee for HD-53 in 2026

==== Results ====
Republican primary results
Party	Candidate	Votes	%
Republican	Kelley Dennison	21,584	57.9
Republican	Christina Blunt	15,666	42.1
Total votes		37,250	100.0

=== Libertarian primary ===
==== Nominee ====
- Gaylon Kent, writer

=== General election ===
==== Predictions ====
Source	Ranking	As of
Decision Desk HQ	Safe D	July 14, 2026
The Cook Political Report	Solid D	February 6, 2025
Inside Elections	Solid D	March 7, 2025
Sabato's Crystal Ball	Safe D	April 10, 2025
The Economist	Safe D	May 6, 2026

==== Post-primary endorsements ====
Joe Neguse (D)

Labor unions

- National Education Association

==== Fundraising ====
Campaign finance reports as of September 30, 2026
Candidate	Raised	Spent	Cash on hand
Joe Neguse (D)	$3,268,169	$2,038,811	$3,220,255
Source: Federal Election Commission

==== Results ====
2026 Colorado's 2nd congressional district election
Party	Candidate	Votes	%	±%
Democratic	Joe Neguse (incumbent)	273,365	74.5%	
Republican	Kelley Dennison	86,414	23.6%	
Libertarian	Gaylon Kent	6,930	1.9%	
Total votes				

== District 3 ==
2026 Colorado's 3rd congressional district election
- Reporting: 95% as of Nov 9 at 10:41 AM MST
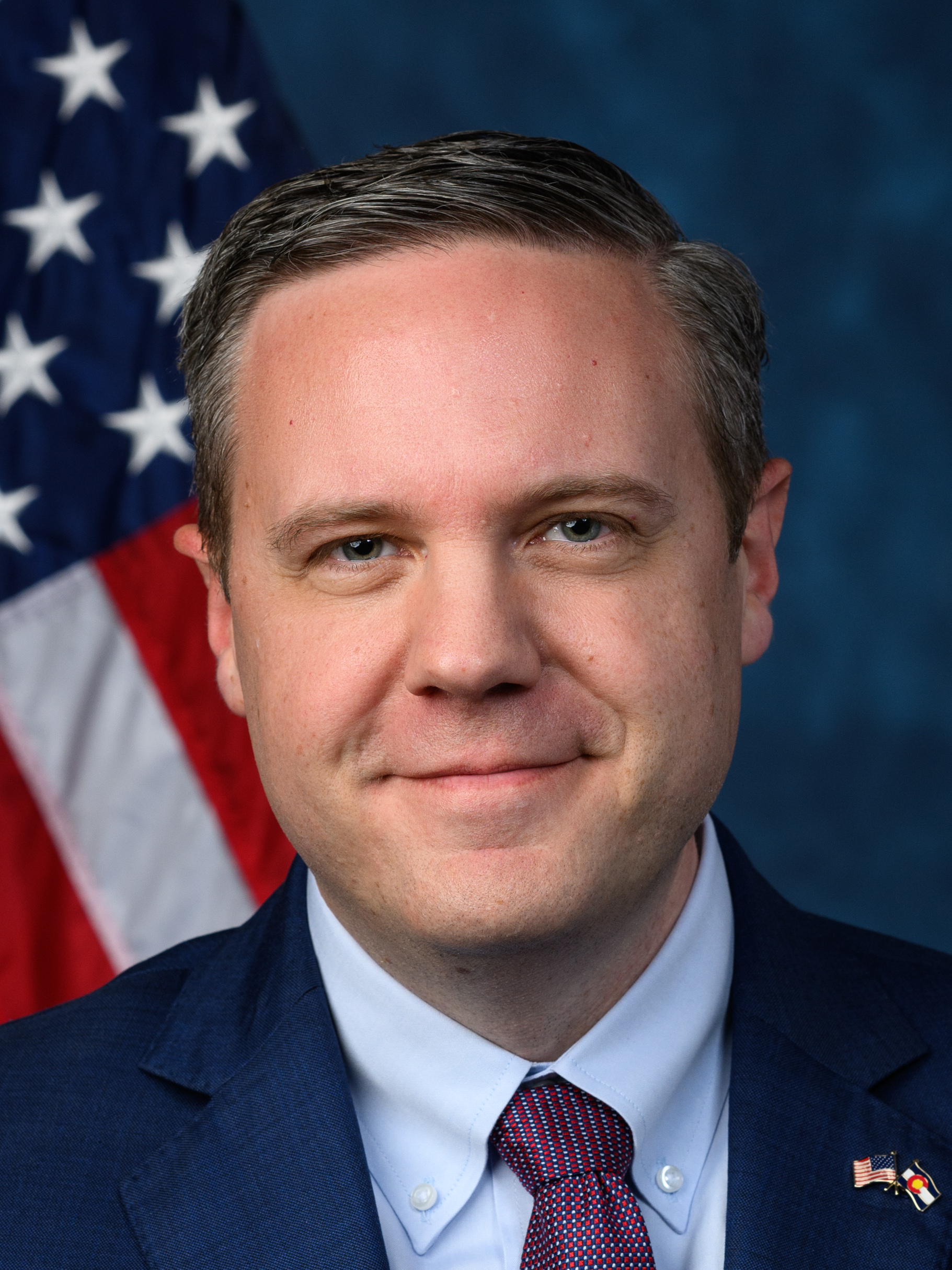

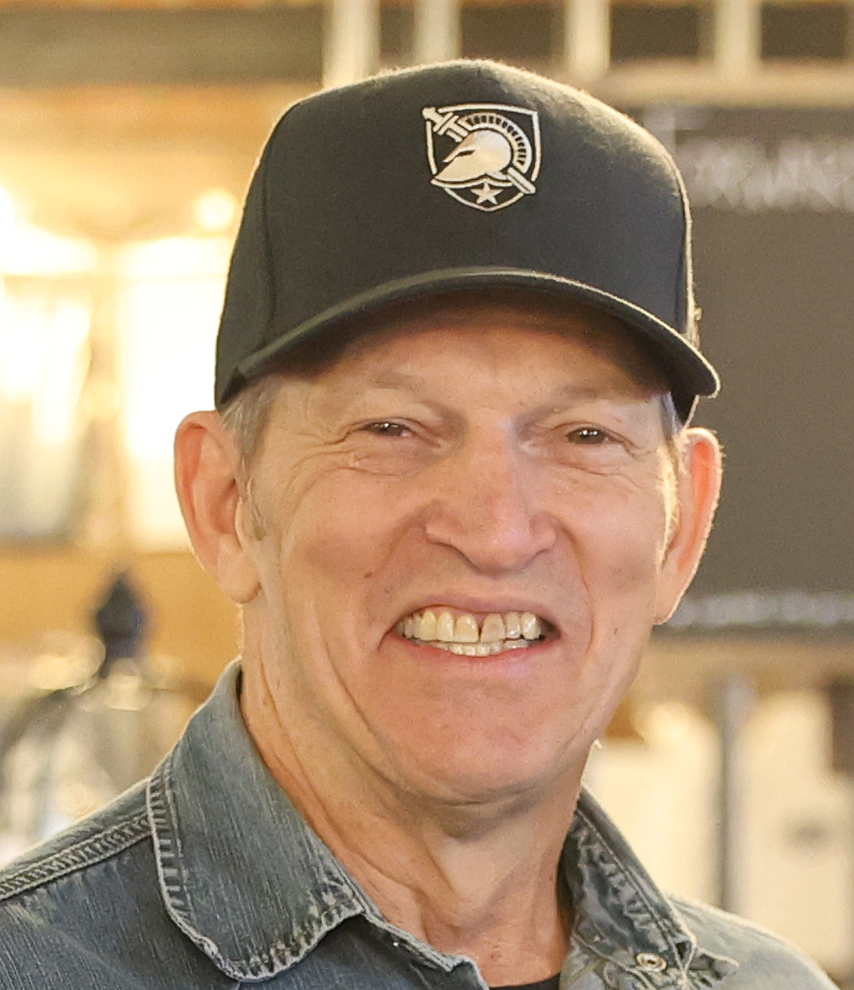
Nominee	Jeff Hurd	Dwayne Romero
Party	Republican	Democratic
Popular vote	163,655	157,523
Percentage	49.3%	47.4%
- Hurd: 40–50% 50–60% 60–70% 70–80% 80–90% Romero: 40–50% 50–60% 60–70% 70–80%
U.S. Representative before election
Jeff Hurd
Republican
Elected U.S. Representative
Jeff Hurd
Republican

The 3rd district encompasses the Colorado Western Slope, including the cities of Montrose, Pueblo, and Grand Junction. The incumbent is Republican Jeff Hurd, who was elected with 50.8% of the vote in 2024.

Donald Trump initially backed Hurd for re-election but rescinded his endorsement in February 2026, calling him a "RINO," and instead endorsed challenger Hope Scheppelman, a former vice chair of the Colorado Republican Party. The following month, Trump reversed course and re-endorsed Hurd after Scheppelman met with him and agreed to withdraw. In a statement, Scheppelman urged supporters to "hold Hurd's feet to the fire" and said she would consider a 2028 primary challenge if he did not "correct his naive voting record."

=== Republican primary ===
==== Nominee ====
- Jeff Hurd, incumbent U.S. representative

==== Eliminated in primary ====
- Ron Hanks, former state representative from the 60th district (2021–2023), nominee for California's 1st congressional district in 2010, candidate for U.S. Senate in 2022, and candidate for this district in 2024

==== Withdrawn ====
- Jason Bias, former president of the Colorado Mesa University chapter of Turning Point USA (running for Colorado House HD-54)
- Hope Scheppelman, former vice chair of the Colorado Republican Party

==== Endorsements ====
Jeff Hurd

Executive branch officials

- Donald Trump, president of the United States (2017–2021, 2025–present) (Note: Trump endorsed Hurd in October 2025, before rescinding the endorsement and backing Scheppelman in February 2026. The following month, Trump announced he was re-endorsing Hurd after Scheppelman announced her withdrawal from the race.)

Organizations

- AIPAC
Hope Scheppelman (withdrawn)

Executive branch officials

- Michael Flynn, former national security advisor (2017)
- ~~Donald Trump, president of the United States (2017–2021, 2025–present)~~ (previously endorsed Hurd; later re-endorsed Hurd)

U.S. representatives

- Tom Tancredo, former CO-06 (1999–2009)

==== Fundraising ====
Campaign finance reports as of June 10, 2026
Candidate	Raised	Spent	Cash on hand
Ron Hanks (R)	$20,846	$10,735	$10,111
Jeff Hurd (R)	$3,278,037	$1,678,549	$1,608,623
Source: Federal Election Commission

==== Polling ====
Hypothetical polling

Poll source	Date(s) administered	Sample size (Note: Key: A – all adults RV – registered voters LV – likely voters V – unclear)	Margin of error	Jeff Hurd	Hope Scheppelman	Undecided
Pulse Opinion Research (R) (Note: Poll sponsored by Scheppelman's campaign)	December 2025	576 (LV)	–	36%	27%	37%

==== Results ====
Primary results by county: Hurd: 50–60%; 60–70%; 70–80%

Republican primary results
Party	Candidate	Votes	%
Republican	Jeff Hurd (incumbent)	62,536	66.4
Republican	Ron Hanks	31,715	33.6
Total votes		94,251	100.0

=== Democratic primary ===
==== Nominee ====
- Dwayne Romero, real estate company CEO and U.S. Army officer

==== Eliminated in primary ====
- Alex Kelloff, ski company founder

==== Withdrawn ====
- Kyle Doster, barista

==== Declined ====
- Adam Frisch, former Aspen city councilor and nominee for this district in 2022 and 2024 (endorsed Romero)

==== Endorsements ====
Alex Kelloff

U.S. representatives

- John Salazar, former CO-03 (2005–2011)

State legislators

- 2 state senators (Note: Dylan Roberts, SD-08 (2023–present); Gail Schwartz, former SD-05 (2007–2015))
- 4 state representatives (Note: Matthew Martinez, HD-62 (2023–present); Diane Mitsch Bush, former HD-26 (2013–2017); Katie Stewart, HD-59 (2025–present); Elizabeth Velasco, HD-57 (2023–present))
Dwayne Romero

U.S. senators

- John Hickenlooper, Colorado (2021–present)

U.S. representatives

- Jason Crow, CO-06 (2019–present)

Local officials

- Adam Frisch, former Aspen city councilor and nominee for this district in 2022 and 2024

==== Fundraising ====
Campaign finance reports as of June 10, 2026
Candidate	Raised	Spent	Cash on hand
Alex Kelloff (D)	$1,212,070	$968,897	$243,173
Dwayne Romero (D)	$688,821	$317,324	$371,497
Source: Federal Election Commission

==== Results ====
Primary results by county: Romero: 50–60%; 60–70%; 70–80%; Kelloff: 50–60%

Democratic primary results
Party	Candidate	Votes	%
Democratic	Dwayne Romero	47,848	54.8
Democratic	Alex Kelloff	39,394	45.2
Total votes		87,242	100.0

=== Independents ===
==== Filed paperwork ====
- Heather Barton

=== General election ===
==== Predictions ====
Source	Ranking	As of
Decision Desk HQ	Tossup	October 27, 2026
The Cook Political Report	Likely R	August 13, 2026
Inside Elections	Likely R	March 12, 2026
Sabato's Crystal Ball	Lean R	November 2, 2026
The Economist	Lean R	May 6, 2026

==== Post-primary endorsements ====
Dwayne Romero (D)

U.S. representatives

- Suzan DelBene, WA-01 (2012–present)
- Adam Gray, CA-13 (2025–present)

Labor unions

- American Federation of Government Employees
- National Education Association
- SEIU Colorado

Organizations

- Blue Dog PAC
- DCCC Red to Blue

==== Fundraising ====
Campaign finance reports as of October 14, 2026
Candidate	Raised	Spent	Cash on hand
Jeff Hurd (R)	$4,168,636	$3,940,004	$237,768
Dwayne Romero (D)	$1,701,091	$1,504,967	$196,124
Source: Federal Election Commission

==== Polling ====
Poll source	Date(s) administered	Sample size	Margin of error	Jeff Hurd (R)	Dwayne Romero (D)	Other	Undecided
Democratic Congressional Campaign Committee	October 20–21, 2026	402 (LV)	± 4.9%	46%	47%	–	8%
Keating Research (D) (Note: Poll sponsored by Romero's campaign)	July 21–23, 2026	500 (LV)	± 4.4%	46%	45%	1% (Note: "Other candidate" with 1%)	9%

Hypothetical polling

Jeff Hurd vs. Alex Kelloff

Poll source	Date(s) administered	Sample size	Margin of error	Jeff Hurd (R)	Alex Kelloff (D)	Undecided
Ragnar Research Partners (R) (Note: Poll commissioned by Conservatives For America, an organization linked to the Republican Study Committee)	March 10–12, 2026	400 (LV)	± 5.0%	46%	41%	13%
Expedition Strategies (D) (Note: Poll sponsored by Kelloff's campaign)	January 8–12, 2026	400 (LV)	± 4.9%	48%	39%	12%

Generic Republican vs. generic Democrat

Poll source	Date(s) administered	Sample size	Margin of error	Generic Republican	Generic Democrat	Undecided
Ragnar Research Partners (R)	March 10–12, 2026	400 (LV)	± 5.0%	47%	37%	16%

==== Results ====
2026 Colorado's 3rd congressional district election
Party	Candidate	Votes	%	±%
Republican	Jeff Hurd (incumbent)	163,817	49.3%	
Democratic	Dwayne Romero	157,660	47.4%	
Total votes				

== District 4 ==
2026 Colorado's 4th congressional district election
- Reporting: 98% as of Nov 9 at 11:03 AM MST
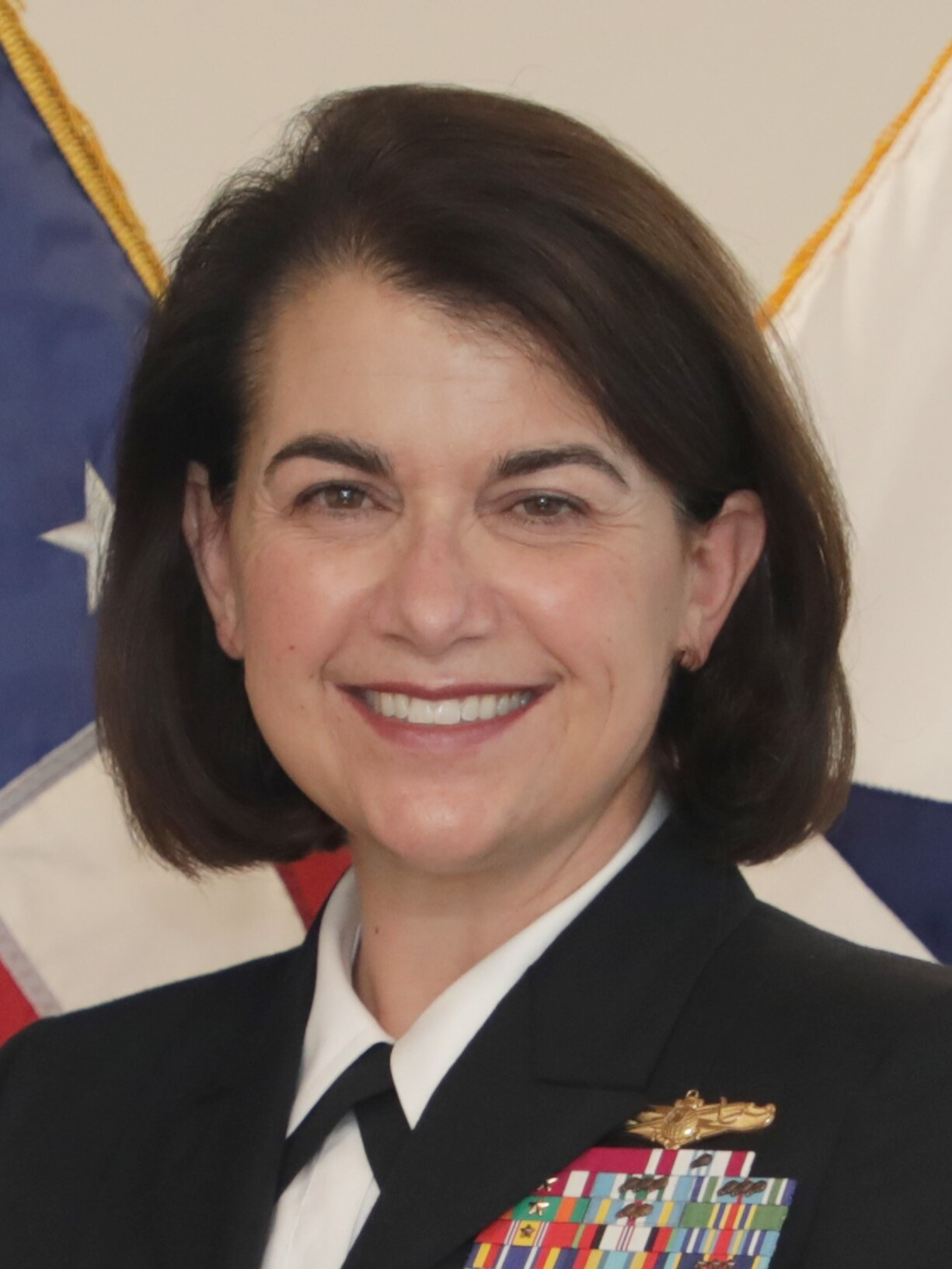

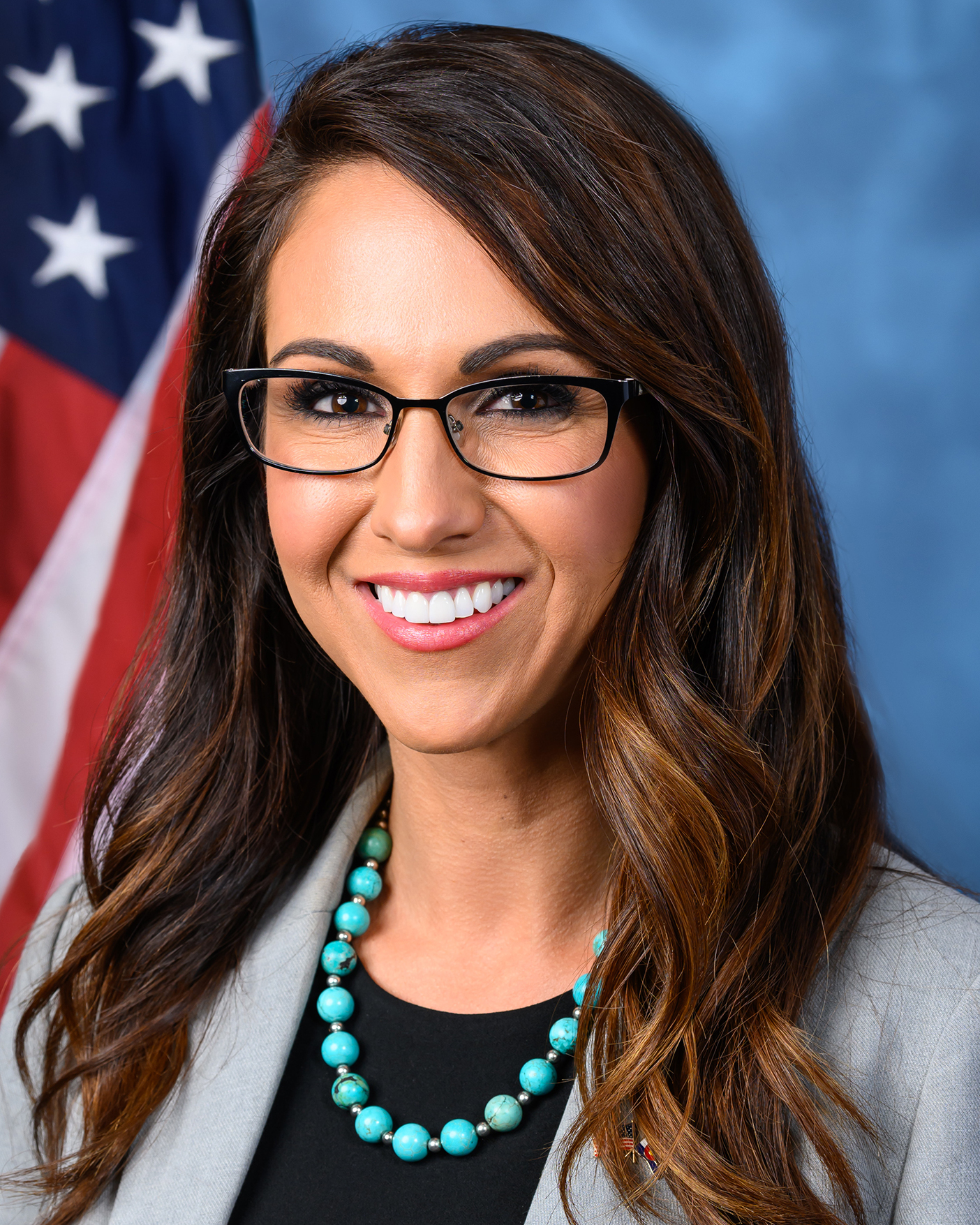
Nominee	Eileen Laubacher	Lauren Boebert
Party	Democratic	Republican
Popular vote	185,923	182,686
Percentage	48.8%	47.9%
- Laubacher: 50–60% Boebert: 50–60% 60–70% 70–80% 80–90%
U.S. Representative before election
Lauren Boebert
Republican
Elected U.S. Representative
Eileen Laubacher
Democratic

The 4th district encompasses the rural Eastern Plains and the southern Denver exurbs, including Castle Rock and Parker. The incumbent is Republican Lauren Boebert, who was elected to the 4th district with 53.6% of the vote in 2024.

=== Republican primary ===
==== Nominee ====
- Lauren Boebert, incumbent U.S. representative

==== Endorsements ====
Lauren Boebert

Executive branch officials

- Donald Trump, 45th and 47th president of the United States (2017–2021, 2025–present)

Organizations

- Freedom Caucus Fund
- Maggie's List

==== Fundraising ====
Campaign finance reports as of June 10, 2026
Candidate	Raised	Spent	Cash on hand
Lauren Boebert (R)	$950,100	$898,346	$210,898
Source: Federal Election Commission

==== Results ====
Republican primary results
Party	Candidate	Votes	%
Republican	Lauren Boebert (incumbent)	92,651	100.0
Total votes		92,651	100.0

=== Democratic primary ===
==== Nominee ====
- Eileen Laubacher, retired United States Navy rear admiral and former U.S. National Security Council director

==== Withdrawn ====
- Trisha Calvarese, communications professional and nominee for this district in the 2024 special and regular elections
- Kurt Maddox, retail worker
- John Padora, engineer and candidate for this district in the 2024 special and regular elections
- Jenna Preston, clinical psychologist

==== Campaign ====
On March 2, 2026, Trisha Calvarese filed a lawsuit in Denver District Court against a member of the Colorado Democratic Party, alleging the party violated state election law by allowing fellow candidate Eileen Laubacher to participate in the Democratic caucus and assembly process. Calvarese's campaign argued that Laubacher is a "lifelong Republican," noting she registered as a Democrat only in March 2025. The following day, a judge denied a request for a temporary restraining order that would have blocked Laubacher's participation. Calvarese ultimately dropped out of the race on April 1, 2026.

==== Endorsements ====
Eileen Laubacher

U.S. representatives

- Jason Crow, CO-6 (2019–present)
- Brittany Pettersen, CO-7 (2023–present)
- Ed Perlmutter, former CO-07 (2007–2023)
- Max Rose, former NY-11 (2019–2021)

Individuals

- Trisha Calvarese, communications professional, 2024 U.S. house nominee and former candidate for this seat

Organizations

- VoteVets
Trisha Calvarese (withdrawn)

Executive branch officials

- Betsy Markey, former CO-4 (2009–2011) and former assistant secretary of homeland security for intergovernmental affairs (2011–2013)

State legislators

- Robert Rodriguez, majority leader of the Colorado Senate (2023–present) from SD-32 (2019–present)
- Jessie Danielson, SD-22 (2023–present) and former speaker pro tempore of the Colorado House of Representatives (2017–2019)
- Polly Baca, former SD-25 (1979–1987)
- Sheila Lieder, HD-28 (2023–present)
John Padora (withdrawn)

Organizations

- Track AIPAC
- Progressive Democrats of America

==== Fundraising ====
Campaign finance reports as of June 10, 2026
Candidate	Raised	Spent	Cash on hand
Eileen Laubacher (D)	$9,952,096	$6,619,992	$3,332,104
Source: Federal Election Commission

==== Results ====
Democratic primary results
Party	Candidate	Votes	%
Democratic	Eileen Laubacher	72,483	100.0
Total votes		72,483	100.0

=== Libertarian primary ===
==== Filed paperwork ====
- Douglas Mangeris, construction superintendent and firearms dealer

=== Independents ===
==== Declared ====
- Tim Veldhuizen, businessman

==== Fundraising ====
Campaign finance reports as of June 10, 2026
Candidate	Raised	Spent	Cash on hand
Tim Veldhuizen (I)	$13,295	$9,781	$3,514
Source: Federal Election Commission

==== Filed paperwork ====
- Wayne Thornton

=== General election ===
On September 17, 2026, an ethics complaint was filed against Boebert accusing her for having sexual affairs with three of her staffers, two females, and one male, while also accusing her for paying roughly $200,000 to prevent the complaint from being filed. It was submitted to the House Ethics Committee, but an investigation has yet to be launched. Boebert has denied the allegations.

==== Predictions ====
Source	Ranking	As of
The Cook Political Report	Lean R	October 23, 2026
Decision Desk HQ	Likely R	July 14, 2026
The Economist	Likely R	May 6, 2026
Inside Elections	Likely R	October 29, 2026
Sabato's Crystal Ball	Lean R	October 20, 2026

==== Post-primary endorsements ====
Eileen Laubacher (D)

U.S. representatives

- Adam Gray, CA-13 (2025–present)

Statewide officials

- Mikie Sherrill, governor of New Jersey (2026–present)

Labor unions

- American Federation of Government Employees

Organizations

- Blue Dog PAC

==== Fundraising ====
Campaign finance reports as of October 14, 2026
Candidate	Raised	Spent	Cash on hand
Lauren Boebert (R)	$1,226,253	$1,111,236	$274,162
Eileen Laubacher (D)	$13,700,426	$11,854,138	$1,846,288
Source: Federal Election Commission

==== Polling ====
Poll source	Date(s) administered	Sample size	Margin of error	Lauren Boebert (R)	Eileen Laubacher (D)	Douglas Mangeris (L)	Undecided
Impact Research (D) (Note: Poll sponsored by the Invest in Tomorrow Coalition PAC, which opposes Boebert)	September 21–24, 2026	403 (LV)	± 4.8%	45%	40%	9%	6%

==== Results ====
2026 Colorado's 4th congressional district election
Party	Candidate	Votes	%	±%
Republican	Lauren Boebert (incumbent)			
Democratic	Eileen Laubacher			
Total votes				

== District 5 ==
2026 Colorado's 5th congressional district election
- Reporting: 95% as of Nov 9 at 7:37 AM MST

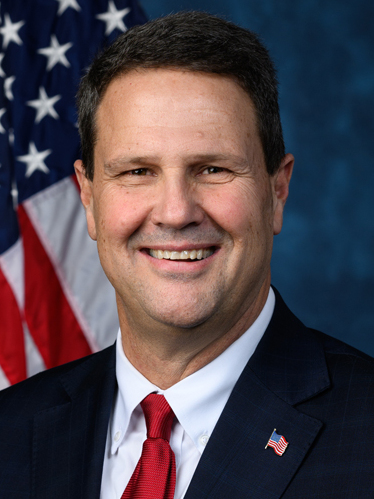
Nominee	Jessica Killin	Jeff Crank
Party	Democratic	Republican
Popular vote	155,598	141,074
Percentage	50.5%	45.8%
- Killin: 50–60%
U.S. Representative before election
Jeff Crank
Republican
Elected U.S. Representative
Jessica Killin
Democratic

The 5th district is centered on El Paso County and Colorado Springs including its suburbs, Cimarron Hills and Fort Carson. The incumbent is Republican Jeff Crank, who was elected with 54.7% of the vote in 2024.

=== Republican primary ===
==== Nominee ====
- Jeff Crank, incumbent U.S. representative

==== Endorsements ====
Jeff Crank

Executive branch officials

- Donald Trump, 45th and 47th president of the United States (2017–2021, 2025–present)

Organizations

- AIPAC
- Americans for Prosperity

==== Fundraising ====
Campaign finance reports as of June 10, 2026
Candidate	Raised	Spent	Cash on hand
Jeff Crank (R)	$1,998,949	$771,384	$1,294,119
Source: Federal Election Commission

==== Results ====
Republican primary results
Party	Candidate	Votes	%
Republican	Jeff Crank (incumbent)	76,547	100.0
Total votes		76,547	100.0

=== Democratic primary ===
==== Nominee ====
- Jessica Killin, former chief of staff to Second Gentleman Doug Emhoff

==== Eliminated in primary ====
- Joe Reagan, former director of outreach for Wreaths Across America and candidate for this district in 2024

==== Eliminated at convention ====
- Zurit Horowitz, occupational therapist
- Justice Lord

==== Withdrawn ====
- Matt Cavanaugh, author and nonprofit executive (previously ran as an independent)

==== Endorsements ====
Jessica Killin

U.S. senators

- Michael Bennet, Colorado (2009–present)
- John Hickenlooper, Colorado (2021–present)

U.S. representatives

- Diana DeGette, CO-1 (1997–present)
- Suzan DelBene, WA-01 (2012–present)
- Joe Neguse, CO-2 (2019–present)
- Jason Crow, CO-6 (2019–present)
- Brittany Pettersen, CO-7 (2023–present)
- Lois Frankel, FL-22 (2013–present)
- Greg Stanton, AZ-04 (2019–present)
- Max Rose, former NY-11 (2019–2021)

Organizations

- Human Rights Campaign
- DCCC Red to Blue
- Elect Democratic Women
- EMILYs List
- League of Conservation Voters Action Fund
- Jewish Democratic Council of America
- New Democrat Coalition Action Fund
- VoteVets

==== Fundraising ====
Campaign finance reports as of June 10, 2026
Candidate	Raised	Spent	Cash on hand
Jessica Killin (D)	$2,742,278	$1,366,706	$1,375,572
Joe Reagan (D)	$277,575	$252,488	$32,555
Source: Federal Election Commission

==== Results ====
Democratic primary results
Party	Candidate	Votes	%
Democratic	Jessica Killin	45,511	61.2
Democratic	Joe Reagan	28,864	38.8
Total votes		74,375	100.0

=== Independent and third party candidates ===
==== Declared ====
- Mark Elworth, businessman (Libertarian)

==== Filed paperwork ====
- Steven Fuller, small business owner (Independent)
- Roy Matthewson, retired army lieutenant colonel (Independent)

==== Withdrawn ====
- Matt Cavanaugh, author and nonprofit executive (ran as a Democrat)

==== Fundraising ====
Campaign finance reports as of March 31, 2026
Candidate	Raised	Spent	Cash on hand
Roy Matthewson (I)	$200	$145	$108
Source: Federal Election Commission

=== General election ===
==== Predictions ====
Source	Ranking	As of
Decision Desk HQ	Likely R	July 14, 2026
The Cook Political Report	Tossup	October 30, 2026
Inside Elections	Tossup	October 29, 2026
Sabato's Crystal Ball	Lean D (flip)	November 2, 2026
The Economist	Likely R	May 6, 2026

==== Post-primary endorsements ====
Jessica Killin (D)

Statewide officials

- Mikie Sherrill, governor of New Jersey (2026–present)

Labor unions

- National Education Association
- SEIU Colorado

Organizations

- Giffords
- Reproductive Freedom for All

==== Fundraising ====
Campaign finance reports as of October 14, 2026
Candidate	Raised	Spent	Cash on hand
Jeff Crank (R)	$2,872,434	$2,396,152	$542,836
Jessica Killin (D)	$5,593,463	$5,085,735	$507,728
Source: Federal Election Commission

==== Polling ====
Poll source	Date(s) administered	Sample size	Margin of error	Jeff Crank (R)	Jessica Killin (D)	Other	Undecided
Public Policy Polling (D) (Note: Poll sponsored by the House Majority PAC, which is focused on electing Democrats to the U.S. House of Representatives)	October 19–20, 2026	577 (LV)	–	47%	47%	–	6%
Global Strategy Group (D) (Note: Poll sponsored by Killin's campaign)	October 14–18, 2026	500 (LV)	± 4.4%	38%	43%	7% (Note: Christopher Mitchell (ACP) with 4%; Mark Elworth (L) with 3%)	11%
Global Strategy Group (D)	October 14–18, 2026	500 (LV)	± 4.4%	44%	46%	–	10%
Global Strategy Group (D)	July 16–21, 2026	450 (LV)	± 4.6%	45%	44%	–	11%
Global Strategy Group (D)	October 30 – November 3, 2025	450 (LV)	± 4.6%	43%	40%	5% (Note: Matt Cavanaugh (I) with 5%)	12%

Hypothetical polling

Poll source	Date(s) administered	Sample size	Margin of error	Generic Republican	Generic Democrat	Undecided
Global Strategy Group (D)	October 14–18, 2026	500 (LV)	± 4.4%	44%	44%	12%

==== Results ====
2026 Colorado's 5th congressional district election
Party	Candidate	Votes	%	±%
Republican	Jeff Crank (incumbent)			
Democratic	Jessica Killin			
Total votes				

== District 6 ==
2026 Colorado's 6th congressional district election
- Reporting: 94% as of Nov 9 at 10:32 AM MST
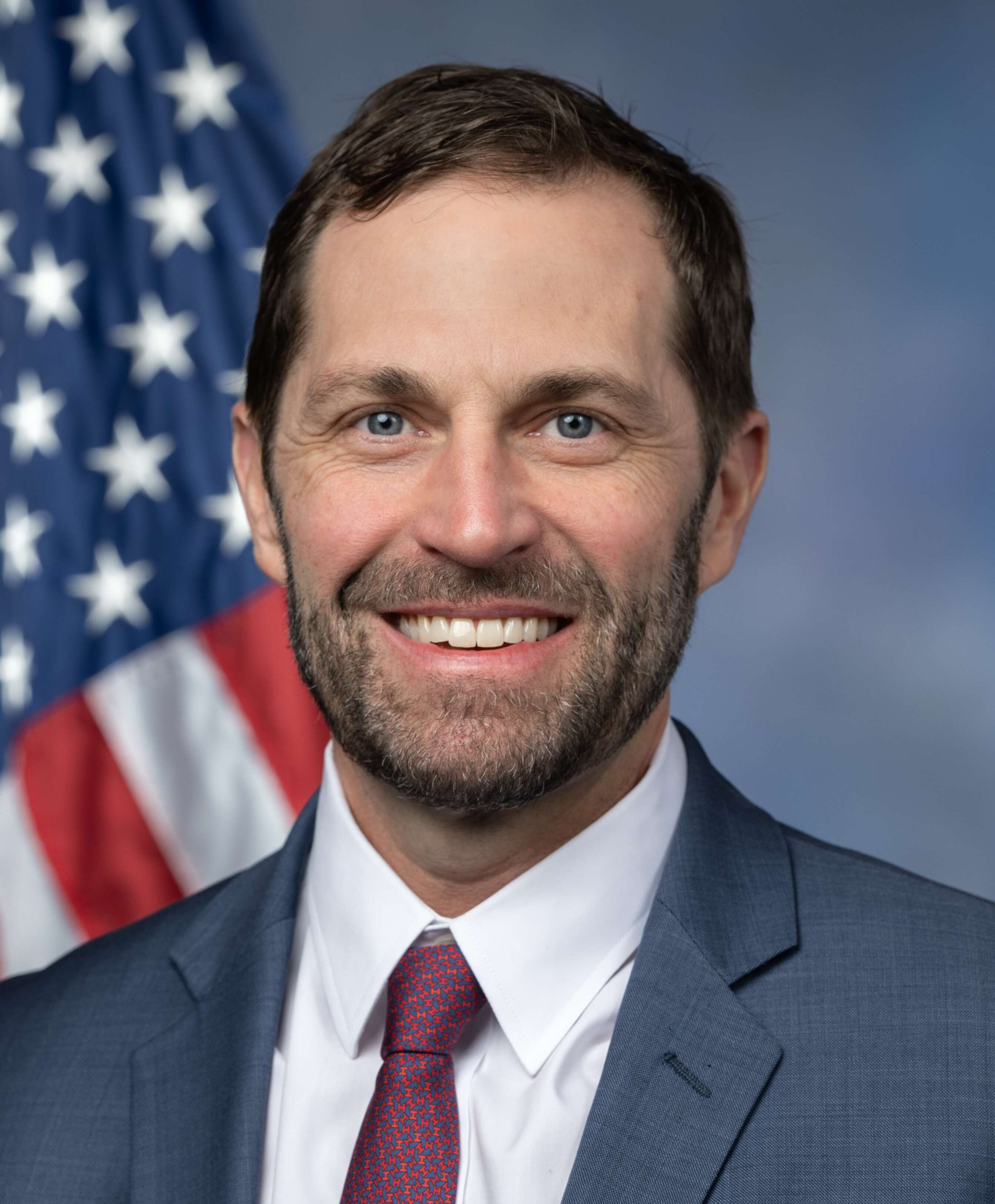

Nominee	Jason Crow	Jason Clark
Party	Democratic	Republican
Popular vote	191,101	90,424
Percentage	65.8%	31.1%
- Crow: 50–60% 60–70% 70–80% 80–90%
U.S. Representative before election
Jason Crow
Democratic
Elected U.S. Representative
Jason Crow
Democratic

The 6th district takes in much of the eastern Denver metropolitan area, as well as parts of the southern and northern area. The incumbent is Democrat Jason Crow, who was re-elected with 59% of the vote in 2024.

=== Democratic primary ===
==== Nominee ====
- Jason Crow, incumbent U.S. representative

==== Withdrawn ====
- Travis Dishon
- Dylan Shelby, retail sales specialist and activist

==== Endorsements ====
Jason Crow

Organizations

- Giffords
- Humane World Action Fund
- J Street
- Jewish Democratic Council of America
- Planned Parenthood Action Fund
- Population Connection
- End Citizens United

==== Fundraising ====
Campaign finance reports as of June 10, 2026
Candidate	Raised	Spent	Cash on hand
Jason Crow (D)	$2,941,727	$2,176,021	$2,514,000
Source: Federal Election Commission

==== Results ====
Democratic primary results
Party	Candidate	Votes	%
Democratic	Jason Crow (incumbent)	94,207	100.0
Total votes		94,207	100.0

=== Republican primary ===
==== Nominee ====
- Jason Clark, small business owner and financial advisor

==== Withdrawn ====
- Mel Tewahade, financial planner, business executive, and documentary filmmaker (original nominee)

==== Fundraising ====
Campaign finance reports as of June 10, 2026
Candidate	Raised	Spent	Cash on hand
Mel Tewahade (R)	$39,765	$30,829	$8,936
Source: Federal Election Commission

==== Results ====
Republican primary results
Party	Candidate	Votes	%
Republican	Jason Clark	38,437	100.0
Total votes		38,437	100.0

=== Independents ===
==== Filed paperwork ====
- Edwardo Quinonez
- Samir Witta

==== Fundraising ====
Campaign finance reports as of March 31, 2026
Candidate	Raised	Spent	Cash on hand
Samir Witta (I)	$100	$36,746	$0
Source: Federal Election Commission

=== General election ===
==== Predictions ====
Source	Ranking	As of
Decision Desk HQ	Safe D	July 14, 2026
The Cook Political Report	Solid D	February 6, 2025
Inside Elections	Solid D	March 7, 2025
Sabato's Crystal Ball	Safe D	April 10, 2025
The Economist	Safe D	May 6, 2026

==== Post-primary endorsements ====
Jason Crow (D)

Labor unions

- National Education Association

==== Fundraising ====
Campaign finance reports as of September 30, 2026
Candidate	Raised	Spent	Cash on hand
Jason Crow (D)	$3,848,529	$2,712,743	$2,884,079
Source: Federal Election Commission

==== Results ====
2026 Colorado's 6th congressional district election
Party	Candidate	Votes	%	±%
Democratic	Jason Crow (incumbent)			
Republican	Jason Clark			
Total votes				

== District 7 ==
2026 Colorado's 7th congressional district election
- Reporting: 96% as of Nov 9 at 11:28 AM MST
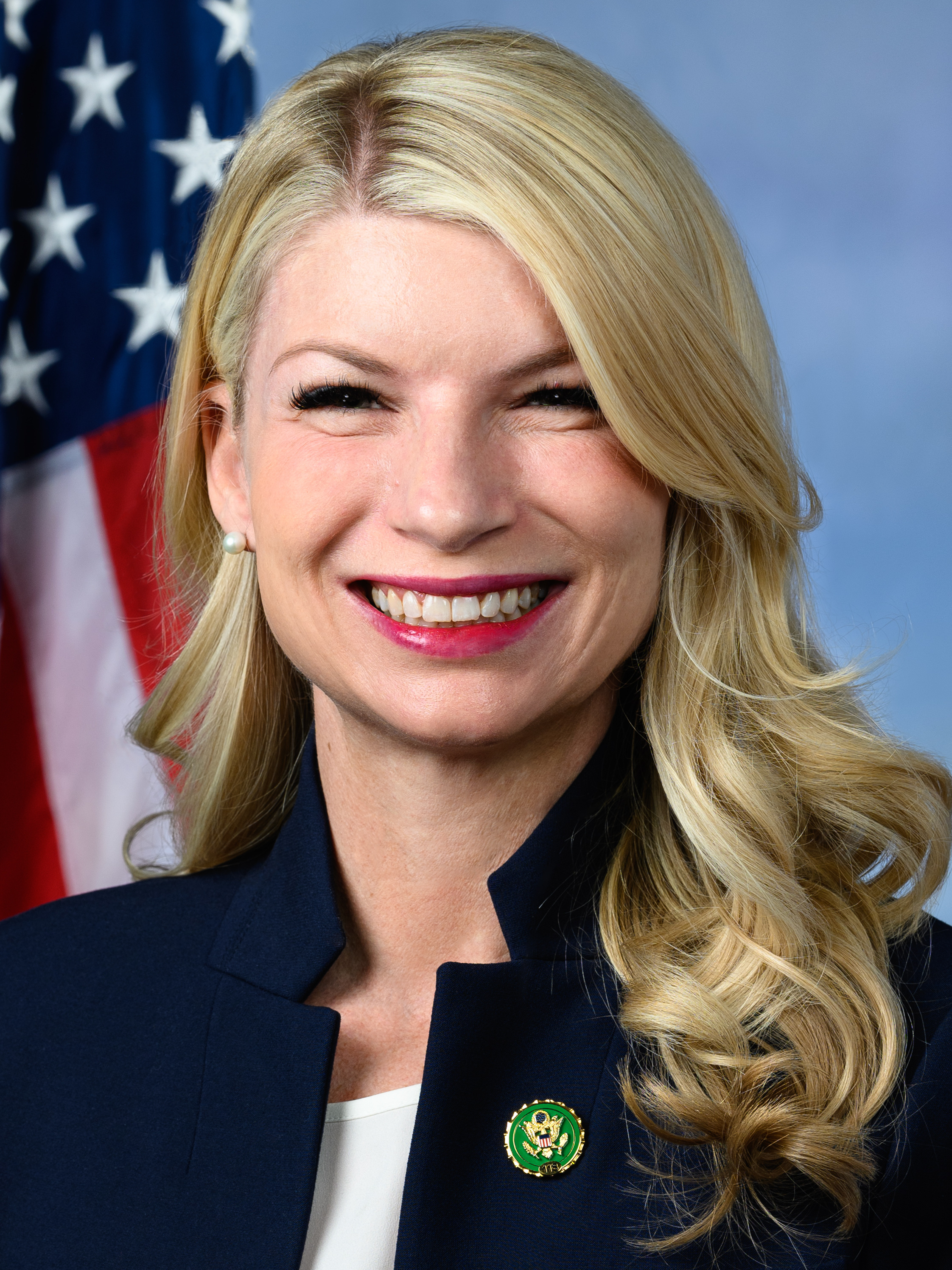

Nominee	Brittany Pettersen	Tim Bennett
Party	Democratic	Republican
Popular vote	228,388	135,917
Percentage	60.7%	36.1%
- Pettersen: 50–60% 60–70% Bennett: 50–60% 60–70%
U.S. Representative before election
Brittany Pettersen
Democratic
Elected U.S. Representative
Brittany Pettersen
Democratic

The 7th district encompasses central Colorado, with a small part extending into the western Denver metropolitan area. The incumbent is Democrat Brittany Pettersen, who was elected with 55.3% of the vote in 2024.

=== Democratic primary ===
==== Nominee ====
- Brittany Pettersen, incumbent U.S. Representative

==== Endorsements ====
Brittany Pettersen

Organizations

- AIPAC
- Giffords
- Humane World Action Fund
- Jewish Democratic Council of America
- Joint Action Committee for Political Affairs
- J Street
- League of Conservation Voters
- Planned Parenthood Action Fund
- Vote Mama

==== Fundraising ====
Campaign finance reports as of June 10, 2026
Candidate	Raised	Spent	Cash on hand
Brittany Pettersen (D)	$1,698,739	$1,274,437	$985,234
Source: Federal Election Commission

==== Results ====
Democratic primary results
Party	Candidate	Votes	%
Democratic	Brittany Pettersen (incumbent)	113,707	100.0
Total votes		113,707	100.0

=== Republican primary ===
==== Nominee ====
- Tim Bennett, U.S. Army veteran

==== Withdrawn ====
- Amanda Capobianco, chief executive officer

==== Fundraising ====
Campaign finance reports as of June 10, 2026
Candidate	Raised	Spent	Cash on hand
Timothy Bennett (R)	$53,462	$52,112	$1,350
Source: Federal Election Commission

==== Results ====
Republican primary results
Party	Candidate	Votes	%
Republican	Tim Bennett	58,806	100.0
Total votes		58,806	100.0

=== Independents ===
==== Filed paperwork ====
- Joe Krzeczkowski, technology executive

==== Fundraising ====
Campaign finance reports as of March 31, 2026
Candidate	Raised	Spent	Cash on hand
Joe Krzeczkowski (I)	$1,331	$331	$1000
Source: Federal Election Commission

=== General election ===
==== Predictions ====
Source	Ranking	As of
Decision Desk HQ	Safe D	July 14, 2026
The Cook Political Report	Solid D	February 6, 2025
Inside Elections	Solid D	March 7, 2025
Sabato's Crystal Ball	Safe D	April 10, 2025
The Economist	Safe D	May 6, 2026

==== Post-primary endorsements ====
Brittany Pettersen (D)

Labor unions

- National Education Association

==== Fundraising ====
Campaign finance reports as of September 30, 2026
Candidate	Raised	Spent	Cash on hand
Brittany Pettersen (D)	$2,216,223	$1,583,684	$1,193,472
Tim Bennett (R)	$102,124	$90,416	$11,708
Source: Federal Election Commission

==== Results ====
2026 Colorado's 7th congressional district election
Party	Candidate	Votes	%	±%
Democratic	Brittany Pettersen (incumbent)			
Republican	Tim Bennett			
Total votes				

== District 8 ==
2026 Colorado's 8th congressional district election
- Reporting: 97% as of Nov 9 at 7:41 AM MST

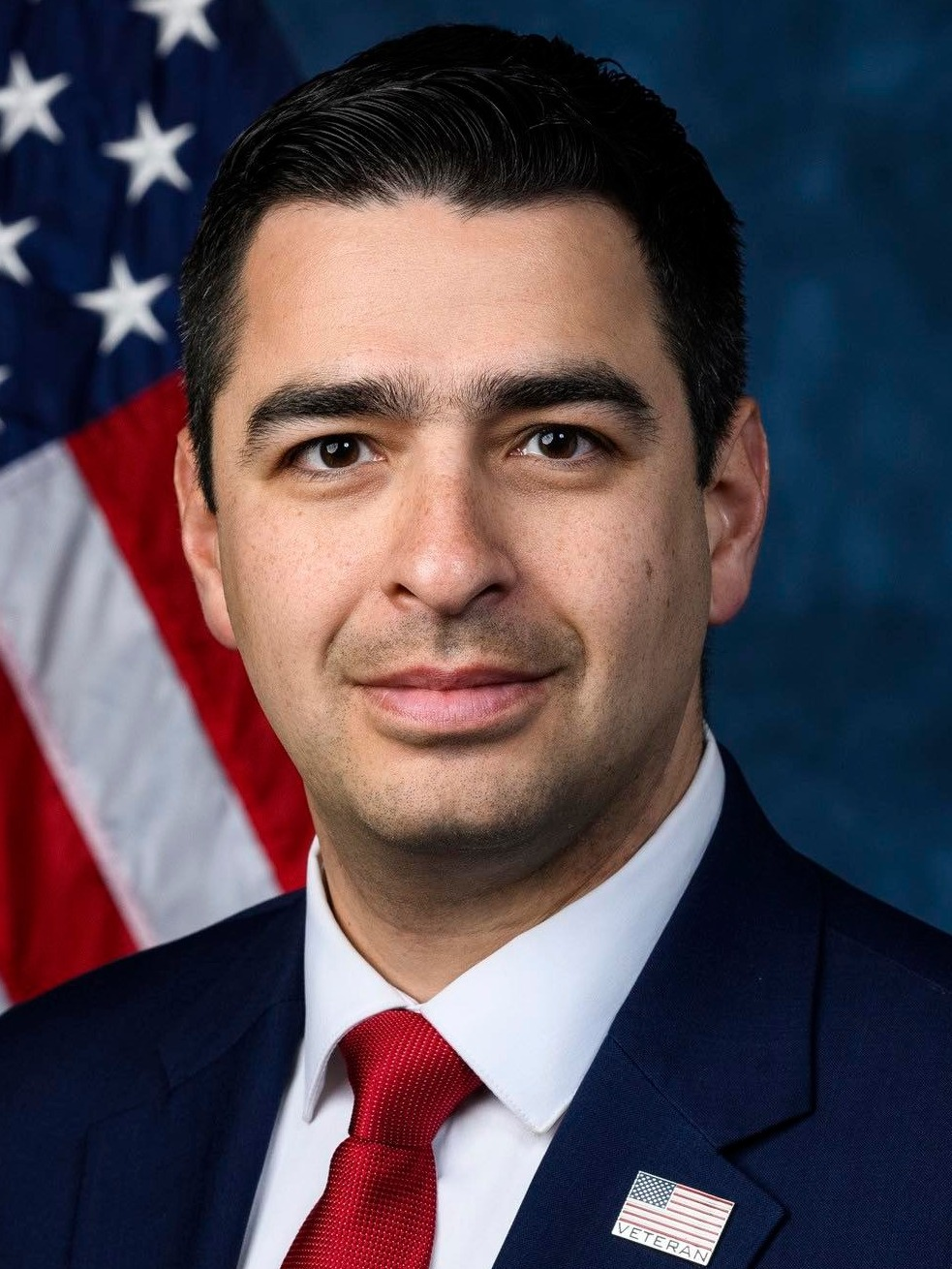
Nominee	Manny Rutinel	Gabe Evans
Party	Democratic	Republican
Popular vote	158,784	116,602
Percentage	55.4%	40.7%
- Rutinel: 40–50% 60–70% Evans: 50–60%
U.S. Representative before election
Gabe Evans
Republican
Elected U.S. Representative
Manny Rutinel
Democratic

The 8th district includes the northern Front Range cities and surrounding Denver communities, including Thornton, Brighton, Johnstown, and Greeley. The incumbent is Republican Gabe Evans, who flipped the district and was elected with 49.0% of the vote in 2024.

=== Republican primary ===
==== Nominee ====
- Gabe Evans, incumbent U.S. representative

==== Endorsements ====
Gabe Evans

Executive branch officials

- Donald Trump, president of the United States (2017–2021, 2025–present)

U.S. representatives

- Mike Johnson, speaker of the House (2023–present) from LA-04 (2017–present)

Organizations

- AIPAC
- Americans for Prosperity
- ClearPath Foundation
- Log Cabin Republicans
- Republican Jewish Coalition

Newspapers

- The Denver Gazette

==== Fundraising ====
Campaign finance reports as of June 10, 2026
Candidate	Raised	Spent	Cash on hand
Gabe Evans (R)	$4,889,696	$1,548,371	$3,416,318
Source: Federal Election Commission

==== Results ====
Republican primary results
Party	Candidate	Votes	%
Republican	Gabe Evans (incumbent)	48,012	100.0
Total votes		48,012	100.0

=== Democratic primary ===
==== Nominee ====
- Manny Rutinel, former state representative from the 32nd district (2023–2026)

==== Eliminated in primary ====
- Shannon Bird, former state representative from the 29th district (2019–2026)

==== Withdrawn ====
- Denis Abrate
- Amie Baca-Oehlert, former president of the Colorado Education Association (endorsed Rutinel)
- Yadira Caraveo, former U.S. representative (2023–2025)
- Daniel Hassler, small business owner
- Larry Johnson, attorney and perennial candidate
- Evan Munsing, Marine Corps veteran and business leader (remained on ballot)
- John Szemler, management software consultant
- Dave Young, Colorado State Treasurer (2019–present)

==== Declined ====
- Julie Duran Mullica, Adams County commissioner (endorsed Bird)
- Kyle Mullica, state senator from the 24th district (2023–present) (endorsed Bird)
- Joe Salazar, former state representative from the 31st district (2013–2019) and candidate for attorney general in 2018 (endorsed Baca-Oehlert)

==== Endorsements ====
Shannon Bird

Executive branch officials

- Betsy Markey, former assistant secretary of homeland security for intergovernmental affairs (2011–2013)

U.S. representatives

- Greg Stanton, AZ-04 (2019–present)
- Ed Perlmutter, former CO-07 (2007–2023)
- David Skaggs, former CO-02 (1987–1999)

Statewide officials

- Roy Romer, former governor of Colorado (1987–1999)
- Elliot Hood, regent of the University of Colorado from the at-large district (2025–present)

State legislators

- Steve Fenberg, former president of the Colorado Senate (2022–2025) from SD-18 (2017–2025)
- Julie McCluskie, speaker of the Colorado House of Representatives (2023–present) from HD-13 (2019–present)
- Kyle Mullica, SD-24 (2023–present)

Local officials

- Yemi Mobolade, mayor of Colorado Springs (2023–present) (Independent)

Organizations

- Blue Dog PAC
- Democratic Majority for Israel
- Elect Democratic Women
- EMILYs List
- Joint Action Committee for Political Affairs
- NewDem Action Fund
- WelcomePAC
Manny Rutinel

Executive branch officials

- Ken Salazar, former ambassador to Mexico (2021–2025)
- Martin O'Malley, former Social Security Administration commissioner (2023–2024)
- Federico Peña, former secretary of energy (1997–1998)

U.S. senators

- Cory Booker, New Jersey (2013–present)
- Gary Hart, former Colorado Senator (1975–1987)

U.S. representatives

- Adriano Espaillat, NY-13 (2017–present)
- Teresa Leger Fernández, NM-03 (2021–present)
- Robert Garcia, CA-42 (2023–present)
- Rob Menendez, NJ-08 (2023–present)
- Emily Randall, WA-06 (2025–present)

State legislators

- Jennifer Bacon, HD-07 (2021–present)
- Adrienne Benavidez, former HD-32 (2017–2023)
- Andrew Boesenecker, HD-53 (2021–present)
- Junie Joseph, HD-10 (2023–present)

Labor unions

- UFCW Local 7
- SEIU Colorado

Organizations

- 314 Action Fund
- Congressional Hispanic Caucus BOLD PAC
- Latino Victory Fund
- New American Leaders Action Fund
Amie Baca-Oehlert (withdrawn)

State legislators

- Judy Solano, former HD-31 (2005–2013)
- Joe Salazar, former HD-31 (2013–2019)

Labor unions

- Colorado Education Association
- National Education Association

Political parties

- Working Families Party
Evan Munsing (withdrawn)

U.S. representatives

- Seth Moulton, MA-06 (2015–present)

Organizations

- VoteVets

==== Fundraising ====
Italics indicate a withdrawn candidate.

Campaign finance reports as of June 10, 2026
Candidate	Raised	Spent	Cash on hand
Shannon Bird (D)	$2,196,077	$1,905,409	$290,667.97
Manny Rutinel (D)	$4,131,903	$3,222,376	$909,527
Source: Federal Election Commission

==== Polling ====
Poll source	Date(s) administered	Sample size	Margin of error	Amie Baca-Oehlert	Shannon Bird	Yadira Caraveo	Evan Munsing	Manny Rutinel	Dave Young	Undecided
GBAO (D) (Note: Poll sponsored by Latino Victory, which supports Rutinel)	June 11–14, 2026	400 (LV)	± 4.9%	–	31%	–	5%	44%	–	20%
	May 27, 2026	Munsing withdraws from the race								
GBAO (D)	April 22–26, 2026	400 (LV)	± 4.9%	–	32%	–	5%	31%	–	32%
Normington Petts (D) (Note: Poll sponsored by Bird's campaign)	April 20–22, 2026	400 (LV)	± 4.9%	–	25%	–	6%	24%	–	45%
Normington Petts (D)	February 19–23, 2026	400 (LV)	± 4.9%	–	19%	–	4%	20%	–	57%
	December 19, 2025	Young withdraws from the race								
	October 31, 2025	Baca-Oehlert withdraws from the race								
	September 12, 2025	Caraveo withdraws from the race								
Public Policy Polling (D) (Note: Poll sponsored by Caraveo's campaign)	May 19–20, 2025	467 (RV)	± 4.5%	4%	5%	36%	–	8%	8%	39%
Public Policy Polling (D)	May 19–20, 2025	467 (RV)	± 4.5%	–	–	51%	–	21%	–	28%

==== Results ====
Results by county: Rutinel: 50–60%; 60–70%

Democratic primary results
Party	Candidate	Votes	%
Democratic	Manny Rutinel	50,435	62.8
Democratic	Shannon Bird	26,122	32.5
Democratic	Evan Munsing (withdrawn)	3,717	4.6
Total votes		80,274	100.0

=== General election ===
==== Predictions ====
Source	Ranking	As of
Decision Desk HQ	Likely D (flip)	September 25, 2026
The Cook Political Report	Lean D (flip)	October 23, 2026
Inside Elections	Tilt D (flip)	October 29, 2026
Sabato's Crystal Ball	Lean D (flip)	October 20, 2026
The Economist	Tossup	May 6, 2026

==== Post-primary endorsements ====
Gabe Evans (R)

Organizations

- U.S. Chamber of Commerce
Manny Rutinel (D)

U.S. representatives

- Suzan DelBene, WA-01 (2012–present)

Individuals

- Matthew Yglesias, journalist

Labor unions

- American Federation of Government Employees
- National Education Association

Organizations

- DCCC Red to Blue
- End Citizens United
- Giffords
- J Street
- Jewish Democratic Council of America
- League of Conservation Voters
- Reproductive Freedom for All

==== Fundraising ====
Campaign finance reports as of October 14, 2026S
Candidate	Raised	Spent	Cash on hand
Gabe Evans (R)	$7,248,106	$5,994,909	$1,328,189
Manny Rutinel (D)	$9,459,070	$8,456,428	$1,002,642
Source: Federal Election Commission

==== Polling ====
Poll source	Date(s) administered	Sample size	Margin of error	Gabe Evans (R)	Manny Rutinel (D)	Other	Undecided
McLaughlin and Associates (R) (Note: Poll sponsored by Enhancing American Competitiveness, a conservative political nonprofit that supports Evans)	September 16–17, 2026	400 (LV)	± 4.9%	48%	46%	–	6%

Hypothetical polling

Poll source	Date(s) administered	Sample size	Margin of error	Generic Republican	Generic Democrat	Undecided
McLaughlin and Associates (R)	September 16–17, 2026	400 (LV)	± 4.9%	47%	47%	6%

==== Results ====
2026 Colorado's 8th congressional district election
Party	Candidate	Votes	%	±%
Republican	Gabe Evans (incumbent)			
Democratic	Manny Rutinel			
Total votes				

== See also ==
- 2026 Colorado elections

== Notes ==
Partisan clients
