= Diana DeGette =

American politician (born 1957)

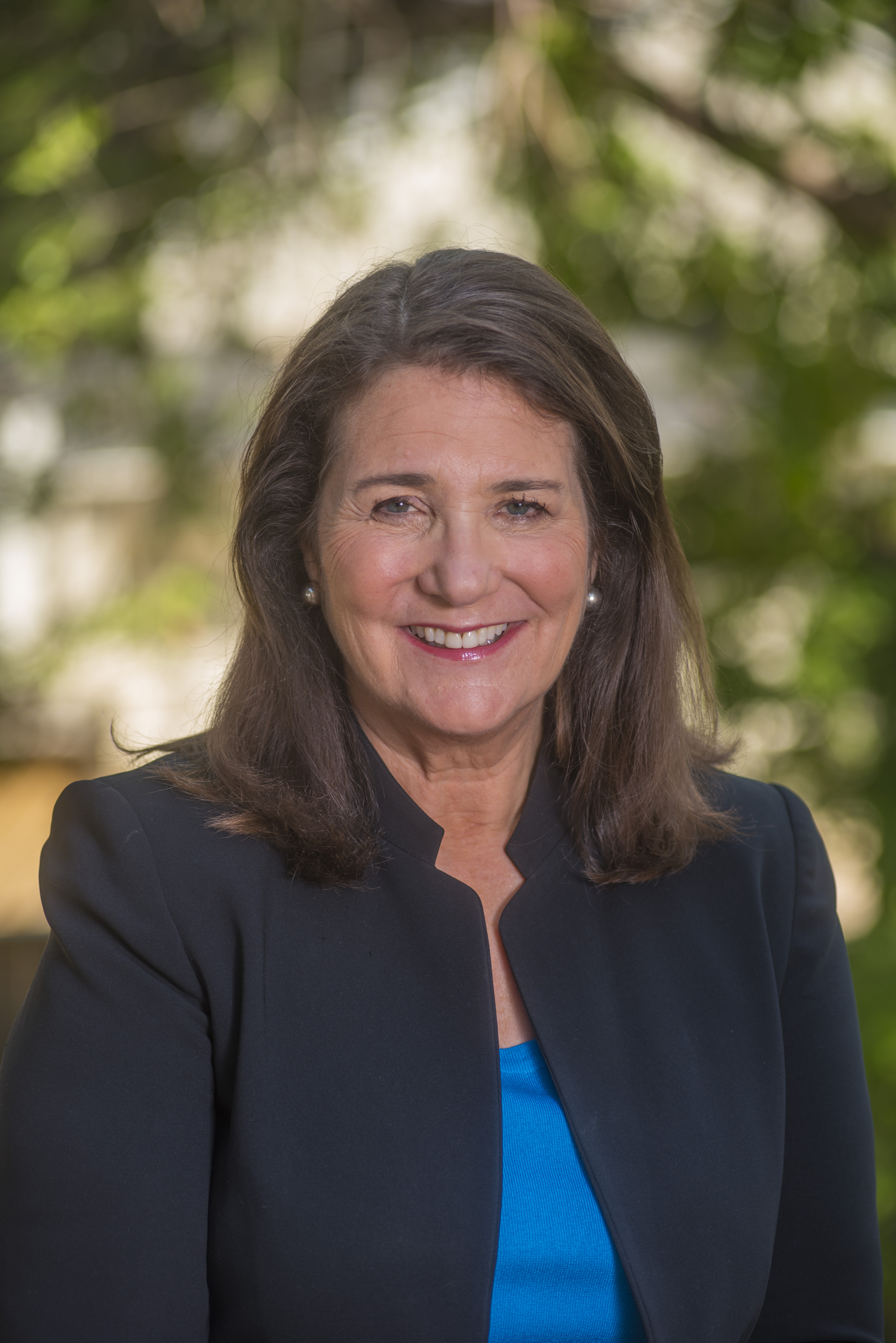
- Official portrait, 2016

Member of the U.S. House of Representatives from Colorado's 1st district
- Incumbent
- Assumed office January 3, 1997
- Preceded by: Pat Schroeder

Member of the Colorado House of Representatives from the 6th district
- In office January 13, 1993 – January 3, 1997
- Preceded by: Gerald Kopel
- Succeeded by: Dan Grossman

Personal details
- Born: Diana Louise DeGette; July 29, 1957 (age 69) Tachikawa, Japan
- Party: Democratic
- Spouse: Lino Lipinsky (m. 1985)
- Children: 2
- Education: Colorado College (BA); New York University (JD)
- Website: House website Campaign website
- DeGette's voice DeGette on the Columbine High School massacre and gun safety. Recorded July 6, 2016

Diana Louise DeGette (/dɪˈɡɛt/ dih-GHET; born July 29, 1957) is an American lawyer and politician serving as the U.S. representative for Colorado's 1st congressional district, which is based in Denver, since 1997. Previously, she served in the Colorado House of Representatives from 1993 to 1997. She is a member of the Democratic Party.

A progressive, DeGette was first elected to Congress in 1996. She served as Democratic chief deputy whip from 2005 to 2019, and has been the dean of Colorado's congressional delegation since 2007. In 2026, DeGette lost renomination in the Democratic primary to Democratic Socialists of America member Melat Kiros.

== Early life, education, and career ==
A fourth-generation Coloradan, DeGette was born in Tachikawa, Japan, the daughter of Patricia Anne (née Rose) and Richard Louis DeGette. Her parents were American, and at the time of her birth, her father was serving in the armed forces. She graduated from Colorado College, where she earned a Bachelor of Arts degree in political science, and was elected to the Pi Gamma Mu international honor society in 1979. She earned her Juris Doctor degree from the New York University School of Law in 1982. She then returned to Denver, and began a law practice, focusing on civil rights and employment litigation.

== Colorado Legislature ==
Long active in Denver politics, DeGette was elected to the Colorado House of Representatives in 1992. She was reelected in 1994 and chosen as assistant minority leader. She authored a law that guarantees Colorado women unobstructed access to abortion clinics and other medical care facilities, also known as the Bubble Bill. The United States Supreme Court found the Bubble Bill constitutional in Hill v. Colorado, 530 U.S. 703 (2000). DeGette also authored the state Voluntary Cleanup and Redevelopment Act, a model for similar cleanup programs.

== U.S. House of Representatives ==
=== Elections ===
==== 1996 ====
Longtime 1st district Representative Pat Schroeder chose not to run for a 13th term in 1996, prompting DeGette to run. Her principal opponent in the primary election was former City Council member Tim Sandos, whom Denver Mayor Wellington Webb endorsed shortly before the primary. DeGette won the primary with 55% of the vote, all but assuring her of election in the heavily Democratic district (the 1st has been in Democratic hands for all but four years since 1933). Schroeder, who stayed neutral during the primary, endorsed DeGette once DeGette became the nominee. DeGette won with 57% of the vote and has been reelected 14 times since, until losing renomination in 2026.

==== 2026 ====
DeGette sought a 16th term in Congress in the 2026 United States House of Representatives elections for Colorado's 1st congressional district. DeGette faced two challengers during the primary—former corporate attorney Melat Kiros and University of Colorado Board of Regents member Wanda James. The 1st was the 10th most Democratic district in the country, with a Cook Partisan Voting Index of D+29, and the Democratic primary had long been the real contest in the district.

After having not faced a substantive primary challenge since her first election, DeGette was seen as vulnerable due to her long tenure and changing demographics within her district. Despite identifying as a progressive, DeGette attracted criticism for accepting donations from Super PACs — seen as antithetical to progressivism — as well as her support of Israel and dismissiveness of the Gaza genocide. The latter issue particularly contrasted her with Kiros, who gained prominence after being fired by her law firm for defending the rights of pro-Palestinian protestors. While defending her acceptance of donations from Super PACs, DeGette attempted to focus on her long tenure and positions on Congressional committees. However, this also drew scrutiny and discussion of her long tenure, as Kiros was born the same year she began representing the district.

The primary race attracted high levels of outside spending, including $1.3 million spending from Super PACs during the last two weeks of the election in support of DeGette. Kiros highlighted the spending as an ethical issue, claiming that DeGette became dependent on campaign donations from industries she regulates such as AI. These groups and DeGette received criticism for attack advertisements against Kiros utilizing Islamophobic messaging and racial stereotypes, an issue witnessed in other races with Muslim Democratic candidates such as the 2025 New York City mayoral election and the Democratic primary of the 2026 Michigan Senate race. DeGette also went viral on social media for negative interactions with constituents, and censorship of these interactions by staff and volunteers.

DeGette's acceptance of PAC donations and stance on the genocide alienated voters, exacerbating claims she did not accurately represent her constituents. She ultimately lost renomination in the primary, with Kiros defeating her by double digits. She is one of five Democratic incumbents to lose renomination to a challenger — along with Adriano Espaillat, Dan Goldman, John B. Larson, and Shri Thanedar — and the most senior incumbent to lose renomination that cycle.

=== Tenure ===
DeGette serves as the co-chair of both the Congressional Diabetes Caucus and Pro-Choice Caucus, and she is Vice Chair of the LGBT Equality Caucus. With the Democrats' victory in the 2006 midterm elections, DeGette briefly considered running for House Majority Whip, but bowed out in favor of Jim Clyburn of South Carolina.

DeGette sat as speaker pro tempore and presided over the debate on December 18, 2019, the day United States House of Representatives voted on the first impeachment of President Donald Trump.

DeGette received national attention in 2005, when the House of Representatives passed legislation she cosponsored to lift President George W. Bush's limits on federal funding for embryonic stem cell research. DeGette, who had been working on the measure since 2001, enlisted the support of Representative Michael N. Castle (Republican from Delaware), who became DeGette's principal Republican cosponsor of the legislation. The DeGette-Castle bill passed the Senate on July 18, 2006. President Bush vetoed the bill the next day — his first veto.

In 2007, DeGette served as the House Democrats' designated whip on the bill reauthorizing the State Children's Health Insurance Program (HR 3162). Although President Bush announced his opposition to the legislation, the House passed the bill on August 1, 2007, by a vote of 225 to 204. The Senate adopted a different version of the legislation the next day.

DeGette was also a cosponsor for the Udall Amendment to the House Energy Bill, which the House approved by a vote of 220 to 190 on August 4, 2007. The Amendment creates a national Renewable Energy Standard that requires electric suppliers to produce 15 percent of their energy from renewable sources, 4 percent of which can come from efficiency, by the year 2020.

On September 12, 2007, DeGette announced that she would introduce the Colorado Wilderness Act of 2007 in Congress. The bill was unsuccessful and did not pass the committee level. She reintroduced the bill in 2009.

DeGette is a cosponsor of legislation to provide the District of Columbia voting representation. On January 24, 2007, Speaker Nancy Pelosi appointed Representative DeGette to the House Page Board.

On November 26, 2007, DeGette announced her endorsement of Senator Hillary Clinton for president and was named national co-chair of Clinton's Health Care Policy Task Force and adviser on stem-cell research. DeGette was a superdelegate to the Democratic National Convention in Denver in August 2008.

DeGette was strongly critical of the Stupak-Pitts Amendment, which places limits on taxpayer-funded abortions (except in the case of rape, incest, or life of the mother) in the context of the November 2009 Affordable Health Care for America Act.

On January 12, 2021, DeGette was named an impeachment manager (prosecutor) for the second impeachment trial of President Trump.

=== Committee assignments ===
For the 119th Congress:

- Committee on Energy and Commerce
  - Subcommittee on Energy
  - Subcommittee on Health (Ranking Member)
  - Subcommittee on Oversight and Investigations

=== Caucus memberships ===
- Congressional Arts Caucus
- Arts Caucus
- Black Maternal Health Caucus
- Pro-Choice Caucus (co-chair)
- Privacy Caucus (co-chair)
- Children's Caucus
- Congressional Brain Injury Caucus
- Congressional Children's Health Caucus
- Congressional Cystic Fibrosis Caucus
- Congressional Multiple Sclerosis Caucus
- Diabetes Caucus (co-chair)
- Down Syndrome Caucus
- Food Safety Caucus
- French Caucus
- Internet Caucus
- LGBT Equality Caucus (vice chair)
- National Landscape Conservation System (NLCS) Caucus
- Natural Gas Caucus
- Public Broadcasting Caucus
- Rare Disease Caucus
- Recycling Caucus
- Renewable Energy and Energy Efficiency Caucus
- Women's Caucus
- Congressional Progressive Caucus

=== Party leadership ===
- Chief Deputy Whip (110th, 111th, 112th Congresses)

== Political positions ==
DeGette is a member of the Congressional Progressive Caucus.

She voted with President Joe Biden's stated position 100% of the time in the 117th Congress, according to a FiveThirtyEight analysis.

=== Abortion ===
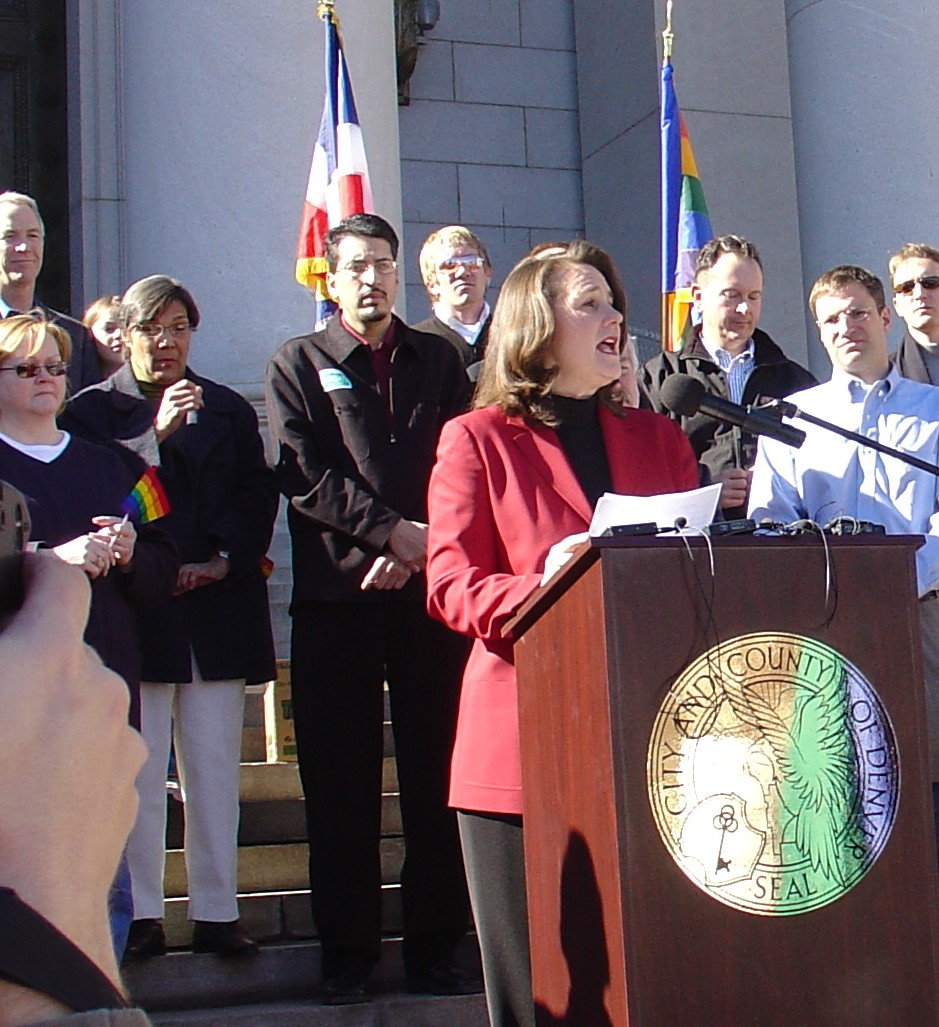
Diana DeGette denouncing a proposed amendment to the United States Constitution to ban same-sex marriage, 2005

DeGette supports access to abortion and is the co-chair of the Pro-Choice Caucus. DeGette and her former co-chair, Louise Slaughter, are the sponsors of the Prevention First Act. This act aims to decrease the number of unintended pregnancies, abortions and sexually transmitted diseases through better women's healthcare. The NARAL Pro-Choice America PAC endorsed DeGette and gave her a 100% approval rating based on her positions. DeGette also received a 100% rating from Planned Parenthood. The National Right to Life Committee gave her a 0% rating due to her strong pro-choice stance.

=== Embryonic stem cell research ===
DeGette has consistently voted in favor of the use of embryonic stem cell research. DeGette says "we must pass common-sense embryonic stem cell research legislation, placing these regulations into statute and once and for all, ensuring this critical life-saving research can be conducted for years to come, unimpeded by political whims or naysayers." DeGette and Charlie Dent introduced the bipartisan Stem Cell Research Act of 2011, which would provide lasting support for stem cell research.

=== Gun control ===
DeGette supports bans on semi-automatic firearms like those used in the 2012 Aurora, Colorado shooting, which happened in a movie theater near her district. DeGette has stated that "the sole purpose of these guns and these magazines is to kill people." DeGette and Carolyn McCarthy introduced the Stop Online Ammunition Sales Act of 2012. The Brady Campaign endorsed DeGette's reelection in 2008, 2010, and 2012.

In 2013, DeGette drew national attention after making an erroneous statement at a public forum about firearm magazine restrictions. She stated, "[t]hese are ammunition, they're bullets, so the people who have those now, they're going to shoot them, so if you ban them in the future, the number of these high-capacity magazines is going to decrease dramatically over time because the bullets will have been shot and there won't be any more available." The comment, failing to take into account the fact that these magazines are designed to be reloaded, fueled long-running complaints by gun-rights groups that lawmakers trying to regulate firearms do not understand the issue.

In June 2016, DeGette and other Democratic lawmakers, led by John Lewis took part in a sit-in on the floor of the House of Representatives to protest the Republican leadership's decision to not put several proposed gun control bills up for a vote.

=== Healthcare ===
DeGette has co-sponsored the Medicare for All Act, a single-payer healthcare plan.

=== Israel ===
DeGette voted to provide Israel with support following the October 7 attacks. She voted against a standalone bill that would have provided aid to Israel in November 2023, saying it ignored the humanitarian needs in Gaza, Ukraine and more. DeGette voted for a combined bill that sent aid to Israel, Gaza, Ukraine and Taiwan in April 2024. She said the bill would "streamline aid to combat Putin’s aggression while sending important resources to Israel, Gaza, Taiwan, and beyond."

== Personal life ==
DeGette is married to Colorado Court of Appeals Judge Lino Lipinsky. They live in Denver and have two daughters together. DeGette sings in her church choir.

== Electoral history ==
=== Colorado House of Representatives ===
Colorado's 6th state house district results, 1992
Party	Candidate	Votes	%
Democratic	Diana DeGette	14,450	56.15%
Republican	Clarke Houston	11,286	43.85%
Total votes		25,736	100%
Democratic hold			

Colorado's 6th state house district results, 1994
Party	Candidate	Votes	%
Democratic	Diana DeGette (incumbent; unopposed)	12,090	100%
Total votes		12,090	100%
Democratic hold			

=== U.S. House of Representatives ===
Colorado's 1st congressional district results, 1996
Primary election
Party	Candidate	Votes	%
Democratic	Diana DeGette	21,523	55.94%
Democratic	Tim Sandos	16,952	44.06%
Total votes		38,475	100%
General election
Democratic	Diana DeGette	112,631	56.93%
Republican	Joe Rogers	79,540	40.20%
Libertarian	Richard Combs	5,668	2.86%
Total votes		197,839	100%
Democratic hold			

Colorado's 1st congressional district results, 1998
Party	Candidate	Votes	%
Democratic	Diana DeGette (incumbent)	116,628	66.87%
Republican	Nancy McClanahan	52,452	30.07%
Libertarian	Richard Combs	5,225	3.00%
Write-in		110	0.06%
Total votes		174,415	100%
Democratic hold			

Colorado's 1st congressional district results, 2000
Party	Candidate	Votes	%
Democratic	Diana DeGette (incumbent)	141,831	68.71%
Republican	Jesse Thomas	56,291	27.27%
Libertarian	Richard Combs	5,852	2.83%
Reform	Lyle Nasser	2,452	1.19%
Write-in		8	0.00%
Total votes		206,434	100%
Democratic hold			

Colorado's 1st congressional district results, 2002
Primary election
Party	Candidate	Votes	%
Democratic	Diana DeGette (incumbent)	24,526	73.48%
Democratic	Ramona Martinez	8,853	26.52%
Total votes		33,379	100%
General election
Democratic	Diana DeGette (incumbent)	111,718	66.28%
Republican	Ken Chlouber	49,884	29.59%
Green	Ken Seaman	3,209	1.90%
Libertarian	Kent Leonard	2,584	1.53%
American Constitution	George Lilly	1,169	0.69%
Total votes		168,564	100%
Democratic hold			

Colorado's 1st congressional district results, 2004
Party	Candidate	Votes	%
Democratic	Diana DeGette (incumbent)	177,077	73.50%
Republican	Roland Chicas	58,659	24.34%
American Constitution	George Lilly	5,193	2.16%
Total votes		240,929	100%
Democratic hold			

Colorado's 1st congressional district results, 2006
Party	Candidate	Votes	%
Democratic	Diana DeGette (incumbent)	129,446	79.77%
Green	Thomas Kelly	32,825	20.23%
Total votes		162,271	100%
Democratic hold			

Colorado's 1st congressional district results, 2008
Party	Candidate	Votes	%
Democratic	Diana DeGette (incumbent)	203,756	71.94%
Republican	George Lilly	67,346	23.78%
Libertarian	Martin Buchanan	12,136	4.28%
Write-in		11	0.00%
Total votes		283,249	100%
Democratic hold			

Colorado's 1st congressional district results, 2010
Party	Candidate	Votes	%
Democratic	Diana DeGette (incumbent)	140,073	67.42%
Republican	Mike Fallon	59,747	28.76%
Green	Gary Swing	2,923	1.41%
Libertarian	Clint Jones	2,867	1.38%
American Constitution	Chris Styskal	2,141	1.03%
Total votes		207,751	100%
Democratic hold			

Colorado's 1st congressional district results, 2012
Party	Candidate	Votes	%
Democratic	Diana DeGette (incumbent)	237,579	68.23%
Republican	Danny Stroud	93,217	26.77%
Libertarian	Frank Atwood	12,585	3.61%
Green	Gary Swing	4,829	1.39%
Write-in		18	0.01%
Total votes		348,228	100%
Democratic hold			

Colorado's 1st congressional district results, 2014
Party	Candidate	Votes	%
Democratic	Diana DeGette (incumbent)	183,281	65.81%
Republican	Martin Walsh	80,682	28.97%
Libertarian	Frank Atwood	9,292	3.34%
Independent	Danny Stroud	5,236	1.88%
Write-in		3	0.00%
Total votes		278,494	100%
Democratic hold			

Colorado's 1st congressional district results, 2016
Primary election
Party	Candidate	Votes	%
Democratic	Diana DeGette (incumbent)	55,925	86.44%
Democratic	Charles H. Norris	8,770	13.56%
Total votes		64,695	100%
General election
Democratic	Diana DeGette (incumbent)	257,254	67.87%
Republican	Casper Stockham	105,030	27.71%
Libertarian	Darrell Dinges	16,752	4.42%
Total votes		379,036	100%
Democratic hold			

Colorado's 1st congressional district results, 2018
Primary election
Party	Candidate	Votes	%
Democratic	Diana DeGette (incumbent)	91,102	68.24%
Democratic	Saira Rao	42,398	31.76%
Total votes		133,500	100%
General election
Democratic	Diana DeGette (incumbent)	272,886	73.81%
Republican	Casper Stockham	85,207	23.05%
Libertarian	Raymon Doane	11,600	3.14%
Write-in		22	0.01%
Total votes		369,715	100%
Democratic hold			

Colorado's 1st congressional district results, 2020
Party	Candidate	Votes	%
Democratic	Diana DeGette (incumbent)	331,621	73.65%
Republican	Shane Bolling	105,955	23.53%
Libertarian	Kyle Furey	8,749	1.94%
Unity	Paul Fiorino	2,524	0.56%
Approval Voting	Jan Kok	1,441	0.32%
Total votes		450,290	100%
Democratic hold			

Colorado's 1st congressional district results, 2022
Primary election
Party	Candidate	Votes	%
Democratic	Diana DeGette (incumbent)	79,391	81.12%
Democratic	Neal Walia	18,472	18.88%
Total votes		97,863	100%
General election
Democratic	Diana DeGette (incumbent)	226,929	80.28%
Republican	Jennifer Qualteri	49,530	17.52%
Libertarian	John Kittleson	6,157	2.19%
Write-in		70	0.02%
Total votes		282,686	100%
Democratic hold			

Colorado's 1st congressional district results, 2024
Party	Candidate	Votes	%
Democratic	Diana DeGette (incumbent)	264,606	76.53%
Republican	Valdamar Archuleta	74,598	21.58%
Unity	Critter Milton	4,084	1.18%
Approval Voting	Daniel Lutz	2,351	0.68%
Write-in		96	0.03%
Total votes		345,735	100%
Democratic hold			

Colorado's 1st congressional district Democratic primary results, 2026
Party	Candidate	Votes	%
Democratic	Melat Kiros	83,855	53.19%
Democratic	Diana DeGette (incumbent)	62,715	39.78%
Democratic	Wanda James	11,075	7.03%
Total votes		157,645	100%

== Books ==
- Diana DeGette, Sex, Science, and Stem Cells: Inside the Right Wing Assault on Reason, The Lyons Press (August 4, 2008), ISBN 978-1-59921-431-3

== Honours ==
- Order of the Rising Sun, 2nd Class, Gold and Silver Star (2026)

== See also ==
- Women in the United States House of Representatives

U.S. House of Representatives
Preceded by Pat Schroeder	Member of the U.S. House of Representatives from Colorado's 1st congressional district 1997–present	Incumbent
U.S. order of precedence (ceremonial)
Preceded by Danny Davis	United States representatives by seniority 22nd	Succeeded by Jim McGovern
Preceded by Brad Sherman	Order of precedence of the United States	Succeeded by Adam Smith
