= Eileen Laubacher =

American naval officer

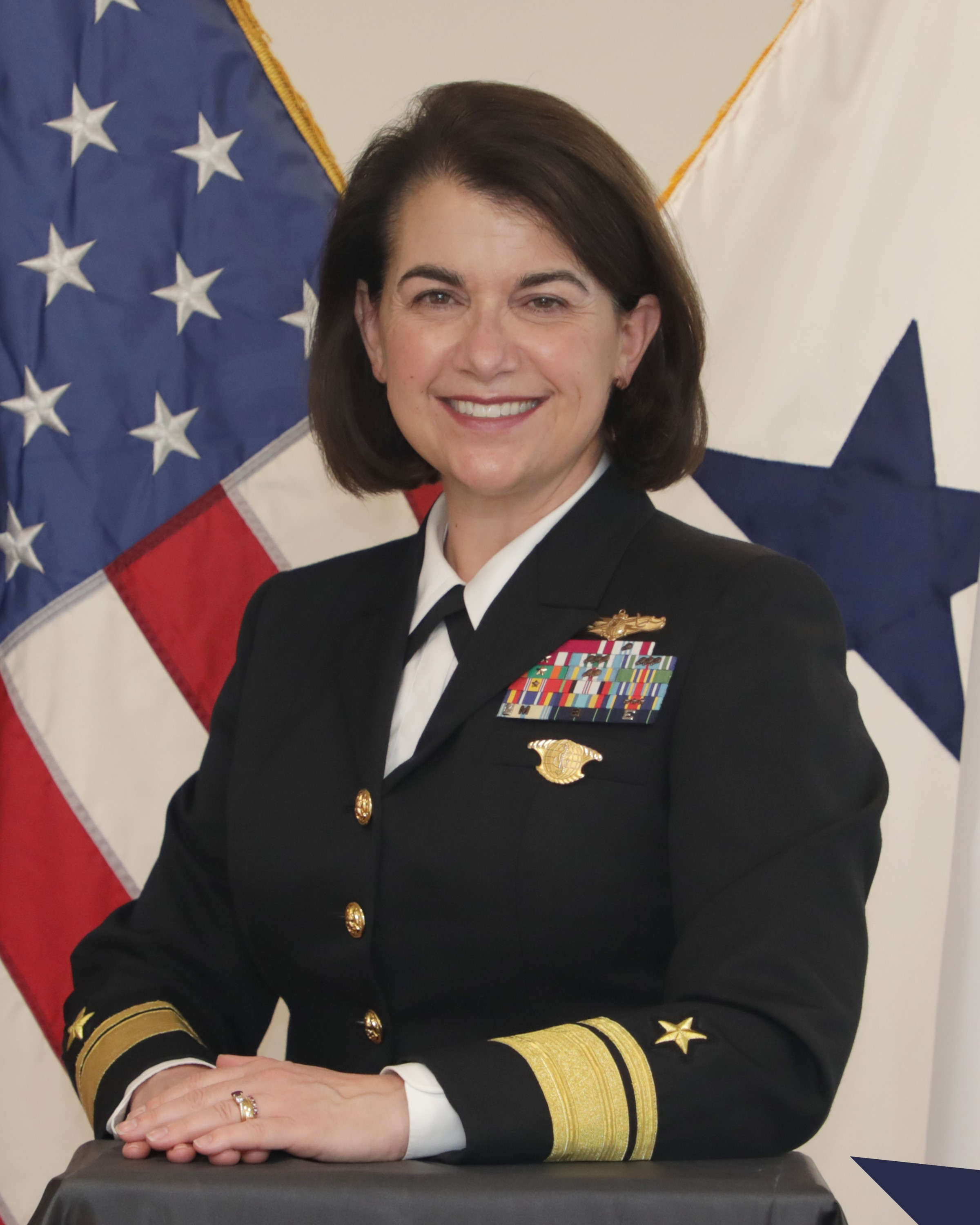
- Official portrait, 2024

Member-elect of the U.S. House of Representatives from Colorado's 4th district
- Assuming office January 3, 2027
- Succeeding: Lauren Boebert

Personal details
- Born: Eileen Haskins; July 16, 1968 (age 58)
- Party: Republican (before 2025); Democratic (2025–present)
- Spouse: Chris Laubacher
- Children: 5
- Education: United States Naval Academy (BS)
- Website: Campaign website

Military service
- Branch/service: United States Navy
- Years of service: 1990–2024
- Rank: Rear Admiral
- Battles/wars: War in Afghanistan

Eileen Laubacher (née Haskins; born July 16, 1968) is an American politician who is the U.S. representative-elect for Colorado's 4th congressional district. She is a retired two-star United States Navy rear admiral who served on the National Security Council under President Joe Biden.

== Early life and education ==
Laubacher was raised in a Navy family. Her father, Vice Admiral Michael D. Haskins, served in the United States Navy for 37 years, and her grandfather served as a Navy combat diver during World War II. When Laubacher entered the U.S. Naval Academy, which her father had also attended, he administered her oath as a midshipman.

Laubacher graduated from the Naval Academy in 1990 with a Bachelor of Science degree in political science and was commissioned as a naval officer. She later earned her Joint Professional Military Education from the Air University’s Air Command and Staff College at Maxwell Air Force Base.

== Military career ==
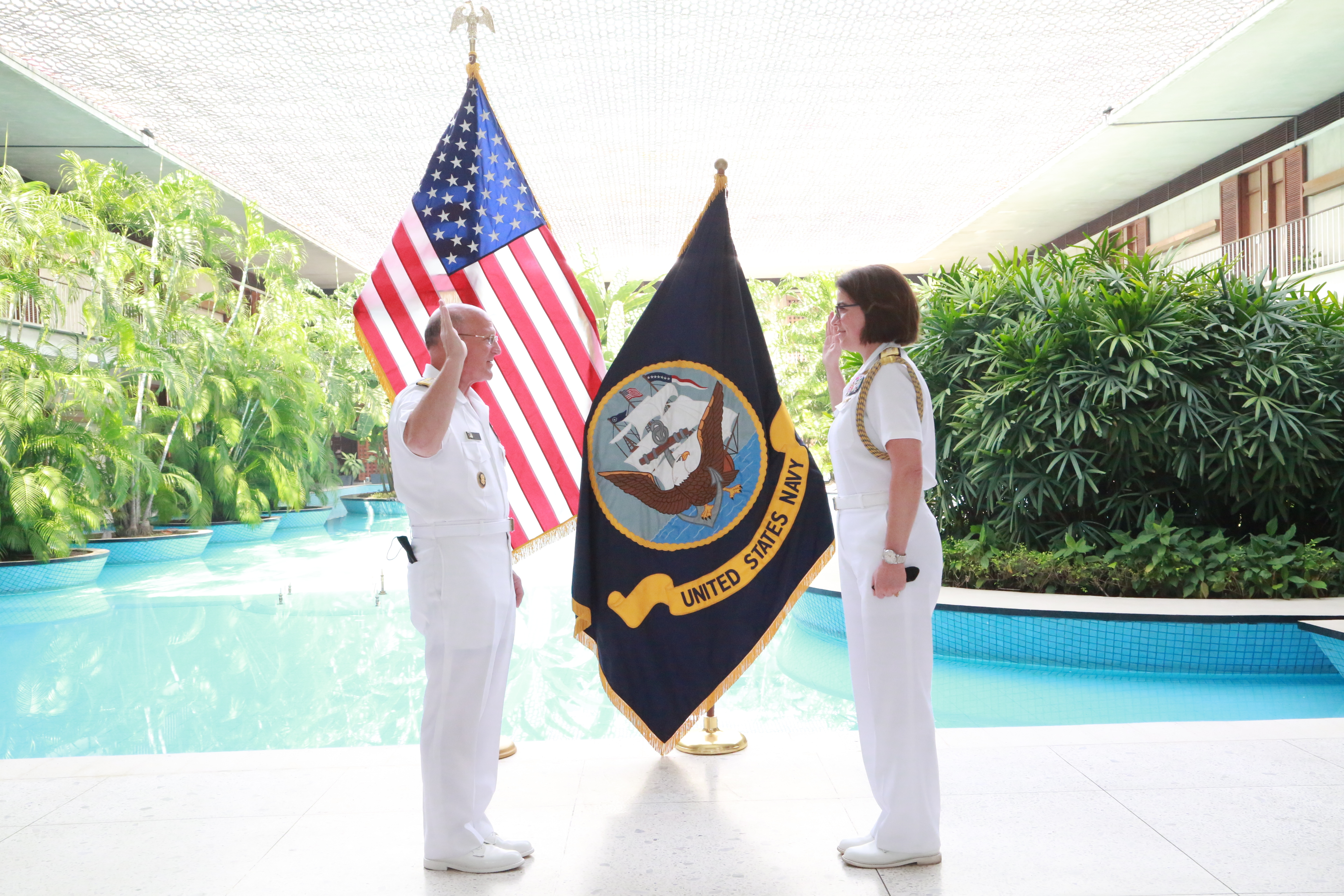
Chief of Naval Operations Mike Gilday administers the oath of office to Laubacher during her 2021 promotion ceremony

After being commissioned in 1990, Laubacher served in an operational role at the U.S. naval facility in Bermuda before moving into intelligence assignments at the Defense Intelligence Agency and the Joint Analysis Center in Molesworth in the United Kingdom. She joined the Navy Reserve in 1998, and during her reserve career served in intelligence and command assignments supporting U.S. Space Command, U.S. Strategic Command, and U.S. Pacific Command.

In 2009, Laubacher deployed to Afghanistan during the U.S.-led war against the Taliban in support of Operation Enduring Freedom. She served as the officer in charge of operational coordination with the Afghan National Security Forces and the ministries of defense and interior within a special operations joint task force group.

Laubacher was promoted to rear admiral in 2018, and held the post of senior defense official and defense attaché at the U.S. Embassy in New Delhi, India, from 2019 to 2022. From 2022 to 2024 she served as special assistant to the president and senior director for South Asia on the National Security Council. She retired from the U.S. Navy in 2024 after 34 years of service.

== 2026 U.S. House of Representatives campaign ==
In May 2025, Laubacher announced that she would seek to represent Colorado's 4th congressional district in the 2026 election as a Democrat. Endorsed by the Blue Dog PAC, she raised $1.9 million in her first 54 days as a candidate, beating the fund-raising record previously set by Adam Frisch in 2023.

In November 2026, Laubacher defeated the incumbent, Lauren Boebert, in the general election.

== Awards ==
Laubacher's awards and honors include the Defense Distinguished Service Medal, Defense Superior Service Medal, Legion of Merit, Defense Meritorious Service Medal (two awards), Meritorious Service Medal (two awards), Joint Service Commendation Medal (four awards), Joint Service Achievement Medal (four awards), Navy Achievement Medal (two awards) and various service, expeditionary, unit and campaign awards.

== Personal life ==
Laubacher and her husband, Chris, relocated to Colorado after she left active duty and joined the Navy Reserve. Their five children were mostly home-schooled by Eileen, but at least some also attended public high school. The Laubachers reside in Highlands Ranch, Colorado, and have three grandchildren.

U.S. House of Representatives
Preceded by Lauren Boebert	Member of the U.S. House of Representatives from Colorado's 4th congressional district Taking office 2027	Elect
