= Wanda James =

American politician

Member of the University of Colorado Board of Regents from the 1st district
- Incumbent
- Assumed office January 5, 2023
- Preceded by: Jack Kroll

Personal details
- Party: Democratic
- Education: University of Colorado, Boulder (BA)

Wanda L. James is an American business owner and politician who has represented Congressional District 1 on the University of Colorado Board of Regents since 2023. James is the first African American woman to own a marijuana dispensary in the United States and the first Black woman elected to the Board of Regents in 43 years. She is also the only cannabis professional elected to public office in Colorado.

== Education ==
In 1986, James graduated from the University of Colorado Boulder, and was the first Black woman to complete the university's ROTC program. After graduation she was commissioned into the United States Navy. She also graduated from the Inaugural Class of the Los Angeles African American Women's Public Policy Institute at the University of Southern California.

== Career ==
James is a former naval officer, who served as an Integrated Undersea Surveillance System officer and whose duties included tracking submarines.

James was drawn to get into the cannabis industry after discovering that America's prison system was fueled by Black and Latino arrests for possession of cannabis, an issue that her brother faced in the early 1990s. Before opening a dispensary, she worked as an executive for two Fortune 100 companies (Avery and Unum) and one of the largest non-profits in California (SCPH). She and her husband also owned five restaurants in Los Angeles and Denver. When she opened a dispensary in 2009 with her husband, she became the first Black dispensary owner in the United States. The pair opened Simply Pure Medicated Edibles in 2010 and became the largest edible medical cannabis company in Colorado. In 2015, Simply Pure became a dispensary in the LoHi neighborhood in Denver. She is a managing partner at the Cannabis Global Initiative.

In 2023, James was honored by Grow Up Cannabis in Canada as the Champion of Justice and Equity, and was the first cannabis professional named to Ad Week's 2021 Trailblazer Award alongside VP Kamala Harris and Tracee Ellis Ross.

In 2019, James and Steve DeAngelo, a fellow advocate for cannabis reform, were the first people inducted into the MJ Biz Cannabis Hall of Fame.

In 2018, James was named one of the 100 Most Influential People in the cannabis industry by High Times Magazine.

In 2015 she was named One of the TOP 50 Female Executives by the publication Cannabis Business Executive (CBE).

In 2010 James was named the Marijuana Advocate of the Year by Westword magazine.

== Political career ==
=== Political campaigns ===
James' political work has spanned over two decades, beginning in Los Angeles working on numerous campaigns as the communications director. After moving to Colorado, she became a campaign manager for numerous candidates. She managed Colorado representative Jared Polis's first campaign, and ran the 2006 congressional race in Colorado Springs, Colorado for Lieutenant Colonel Jay Fawcett. She worked on former President Barack Obama's 2008 National Finance Committee. She worked on Colorado governor John Hickenlooper's task force for Colorado's Amendment 64. She also served on Senator Kamala Harris' National Finance Committee as she ran for POTUS.

She has served as the President of the Nation Women's Political Caucus - Los Angeles. She was named a Junior League Board Fellow in 2002 and also served on the board of directors of the Starlight Children's Foundation and the Greater Los Angeles African American Chamber of Commerce. She was appointed to the Los Angeles Small and Local Business Commission.

=== Political appointments ===
Moving to Colorado, her first board appointment was on the Alumni Board at the University of Colorado. She worked on Colorado Governor John Hickenlooper's task force for Colorado's Amendment 64. She also served on Governor Jared Polis' 2019 Transition Team and Mayor Mike Johnston's 2023 Transition Team. She was appointed to the Colorado Tourism Board in 2019.

=== 2026 U.S. House candidacy ===
In September 2025, James announced she was seeking the Democratic nomination to represent Colorado's 1st Congressional District in the 2026 elections. She placed third in the Democratic primary, losing to Melat Kiros.

== Controversies ==
=== Board of Regents censure ===
James was censured by her fellow regents on July 2, 2025. The censure, which passed 7-1, with James abstaining, was approved after James objected to parts of an Anschutz Medical Campus campaign to educate people on the risks of using cannabis. The campaign materials included illustrations of Black or dark-skinned males with text describing marijuana's effects, including poor academic performance and laziness. James sought to defund the campaign and have the funds spent elsewhere.

A majority of James' colleagues on the Board of Regents felt that James had a conflict of interest in seeking to defund the campaign because she owns a cannabis dispensary. They thought James was concerned that the campaign would cause the dispensary's business to suffer, though James has denied this.

The censure prohibits James from serving on regent committees and holding leadership positions on the board, it retracts invitations she has received to attend university events in her official capacity as a university regent, and it eliminates any similar future invitations.

== Honors and appearances ==
James has appeared on the covers of seven national magazines. In 1997 she graced the cover of the February issue of Black Enterprise for following her passion and leaving corporate America. She was featured on the inaugural edition of the April 2016 issue of Sensi Magazine, the January 2018 issue of Dispensary Magazine the Fall 2018 cover of Cannabis & Tech, the November 2020 cover of Vanguard Magazine, the October 2021 cover of the Denver Urban Spectrum, and most recently the cover December 2023 issue of Cannabis Business Times.

James has appeared on numerous television shows, including SMOKE on BET, The Daily Show with Jon Stewart, CBS Sunday Morning, CNBC's Marijuana USA, and Smile Jamaica.

== Personal life ==
James is married to Scott Durrah, a former United States Marine. He is a certified chef.
