= Joint Action Committee for Political Affairs =

US national political action committee

- Abbreviation: JAC
- Formation: 1981; 45 years ago
- Legal status: Political Action Committee
- Purpose: To help elect members of the U.S. Congress who support a strong US-Israel relationship, reproductive choice, and separation of religion and state.
- Headquarters: Highland Park, IL
- Location: United States
- Members: 800
- President: Susan Berk
- Executive Director: Hollis Wein
- Website: www.jacpac.org

Joint Action Committee for Political Affairs (JAC) is a national political action committee that contributes to candidates for the United States Congress who support strengthening the U.S.-Israel relationship and supporting Zionism, as well as prioritize liberal domestic policies such as protecting reproductive rights, promoting gun reform, and upholding the separation of church and state.

Unlike most other pro-Israel PACs, JAC concerns itself not only with supporting the US-Israel relationship, but also with confronting other domestic issues it deems of importance to the Jewish community.

JACPAC funds its support for Congressional campaigns through annual memberships and through the bundling of member donations to candidates. Although JACPAC describes itself as bipartisan, the vast majority of its support goes to members of the Democratic Party.

== Mission ==
JAC was founded as the first pro-Israel PAC to also prioritize a commitment to a progressive domestic agenda. Although JAC favors US involvement in the Israeli-Palestinian peace process, it takes no position on internal Israeli politics, instead focusing its Israel advocacy on strengthening the US–Israel Relationship.

Viewing itself as a progressive political voice for the American Jewish community, JAC prioritizes creating resources to better inform its members and encourage political engagement. According to its literature, JAC blends Judaism's call to action with America's fundamental grassroots political involvement.

In addition to JACPAC, JAC's Political Action Committee, the organization also operates the JAC Education Foundation, a non-partisan, tax-exempt 501(c)(3) organization committed to promoting community political engagement. Each year, the JAC Education Foundation publishes the Jewish Community Voter Guide, an informative resource containing voting records for all members of Congress on issues of concern to the Jewish community.

== History ==
JAC was established in 1981 as the first national Jewish women's PAC in the United States. The PAC was established by a group of volunteer leaders in the national Jewish community who sought to empower Jewish women to become politically active.

The PAC's establishment came in response to the surge in power of the organized political right, then known as the religious right or the radical right, in US politics during the 1980 United States elections. The group's founders sought to counteract the rise of organizations such as the Moral Majority and The Christian Coalition, who were instrumental in defeating Congressional allies of Israel in the 1980 election. These organizations opposed providing aid to Israel (and foreign aid in general) and favored mandating prayer in schools, which JAC's founders strongly opposed.

In response to the Republican Party's efforts to mobilize Christian voters, JAC began building the infrastructure to mobilize Jewish voters in the United States and encourage increased political engagement.

In 1989, the US Supreme Court ruled in Webster v. Reproductive Health Services that states could legislate certain limits on abortion rights, resulting in a surge in anti-abortion advocacy from right-wing religious groups. Recognizing that opposition to abortion was moving to the top of the right wing political agenda, JACPAC began explicitly incorporating reproductive choice into its mission that same year.

Though at its inception, JACPAC was explicitly a women's organization, they have since modified their messaging to encourage men to join as well.

== Activities ==
Through its nationwide membership, JACPAC raises campaign contributions to support US Senate and House candidates who support its agenda. Before endorsing candidates, JAC first identifies the candidate's support for Israel and then analyzes their stances on domestic issues. According to the Chicago Tribune, JACPAC prides itself on identifying challengers who have potential for success. Charlie Cook, founder of the Cook Political Report, has stated that JACPAC is "more knowledgeable about their races than 95 percent of the PACs out there."

JACPAC raised over $800,000 for federal candidates through both direct and conduit contributions in the 2022 midterm elections. In 2022, JAC provided support for 64 candidates for the US House of Representatives and 17 candidates for the US Senate.

== Advocacy ==
Joint Action Committee (JAC) is an advocacy group that promotes the United States-Israel relationship, separation of religion and state, reproductive freedom, and selected initiatives consistent with Jewish community values. One such initiative is to gather support for US ratification of the United Nations Convention on the Elimination of All Forms of Discrimination against Women (CEDAW). To promote its agenda, Joint Action Committee enlists Jewish community participation in advocacy with elected officials. The Joint Action Committee (JAC) is organized as a non-profit charitable organization under IRS code 501(c)(4).

JAC holds an annual conference in Washington, D.C. each spring. During this conference, JAC members meet in small delegations with members of Congress from diverse states and regions to discuss issues of concern to the PAC. Some 100 appointments are scheduled each year.
