= Melat Kiros =

American lawyer and politician (born 1997)

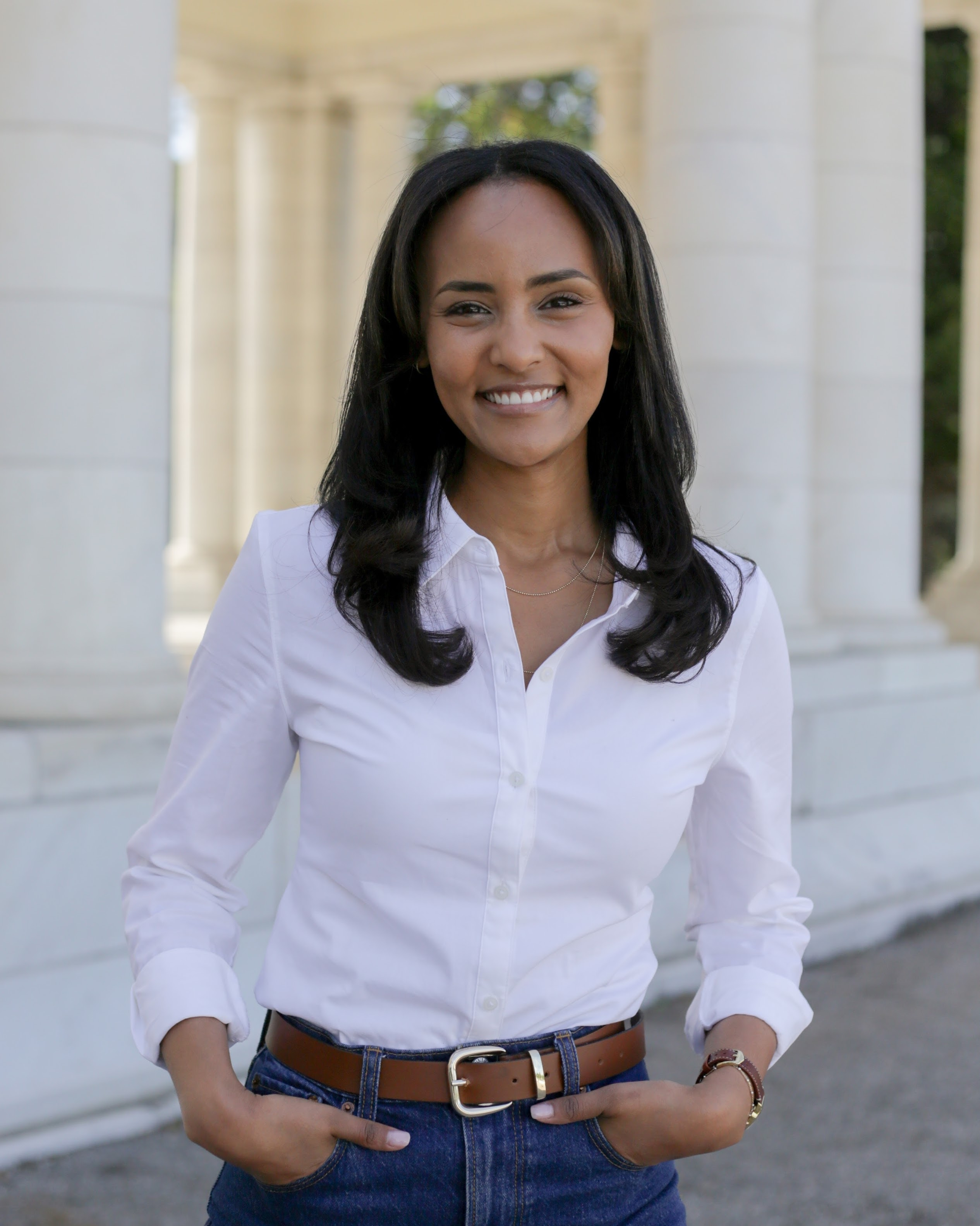
- Kiros in 2025

Member-elect of the U.S. House of Representatives from Colorado's 1st district
- Assuming office January 3, 2027
- Succeeding: Diana DeGette

Personal details
- Born: Melat Asfawosen Kiros; May 23, 1997 (age 29) Addis Ababa, Ethiopia
- Party: Democratic
- Other political affiliations: Democratic Socialists of America (Note: The Democratic Socialists of America (DSA) are not a registered political party. Instead, they are a political organization for those with democratic socialist ideologies. Kiros is a member of and is endorsed by the Denver DSA chapter.)
- Education: Washington College (BA); University of Notre Dame (JD); University of Colorado, Denver (attended)
- Website: Campaign website

Melat Asfawosen Kiros (born May 23, 1997) is an American lawyer and politician. A member of the Democratic Party and the Democratic Socialists of America, she is the representative-elect of Colorado's 1st congressional district, defeating Republican Christy Peterson in the 2026 midterm elections. Kiros became the Democratic nominee after defeating 15-term incumbent Diana DeGette in the primary.

Kiros is the first Generation Z woman elected to Congress and the second Generation Z member of Congress, after Maxwell Frost. She is also the first Black woman to represent Colorado in the House.

== Early life ==
Kiros was born in Addis Ababa, Ethiopia, to a family of Tigrayan origin, and her parents immigrated to the United States when she was an infant. According to her campaign website, Kiros was born "weeks before" her father was picked in the United States' Diversity Visa Lottery.

Kiros grew up in Aurora, Colorado, and attended Eaglecrest High School. She graduated from Washington College with a bachelor's degree in political science and economics in 2018, and from Notre Dame Law School in 2022.

== Early career ==
Kiros joined the New York law office of Sidley Austin as a summer associate in 2021, becoming a full-time associate in September 2022. At the time of her firing she was a securities regulatory and enforcement associate. In 2023, she published a post on Medium criticizing law firms, including her own, for opposing pro-Palestine protests and highlighting the "chilling future" of lawyers' employment prospects for criticism of the Israeli government's actions and its legitimacy." Sidley Austin asked Kiros to take the letter down. When she refused, she was fired.

After leaving Sidley Austin, Kiros returned to Colorado, enrolled in a PhD program at the University of Colorado Denver School of Public Affairs, studying "the efficacy of reparations, universal basic income and regulatory reform in achieving social, economic, and environmental equity." She worked as a barista to help pay off her student loans.

== U.S. House of Representatives ==
=== Elections ===
==== 2026 ====
Democratic primary results by precinct (Note: Arapahoe County precinct results unavailable as of July 18, 2026; they are shaded by county-wide vote.) Kiros: 40–50%; 50–60%; 60–70%; 70–80%; 80–90%; DeGette: 40–50%; 50–60%; 60–70%; 70–80%; Tie: 40–50%

On July 9, 2025, Kiros announced her candidacy for the United States House of Representatives for Colorado's 1st congressional district, challenging incumbent Diana DeGette, who was first elected to Congress in 1996.

When asked about her motivation for challenging DeGette, who is widely considered to be on the progressive side of the Democratic Party, Kiros signaled that the campaign would focus on the generational divide, as well as money in politics. Kiros has refused donations from corporate PACs and special interest groups in her campaign. She went on to criticize over $5 million in corporate PAC money that DeGette had received from the pharmaceutical lobby and the fossil fuels lobby.

During the primary, Kiros was endorsed by Justice Democrats, the Democratic Socialists of America, the Working Families Party, and U.S. Senator Bernie Sanders. DeGette was endorsed by the Congressional Progressive Caucus.

The Colorado Sun reported that the Israeli–Palestinian conflict was the biggest policy difference between Kiros and DeGette. Kiros supports an embargo on all arms sales to Israel, and says that Israel should no longer be a Jewish state, calling it an ethnocracy.

The primary campaign saw large amounts of outside spending, primarily supporting DeGette and attacking Kiros. Three Super PACs spent $1.3 million on advertisements attacking Kiros in the campaign's last two months. Kiros won the primary on June 30 by over 20,000 votes; her victory garnered national attention and was described as an "upset" that highlighted the growing influence of anti-establishment and DSA-aligned candidates.

The district is so heavily Democratic that Kiros was overwhelmingly favored to win the general election. On November 3, she was elected with 78.3% of the vote, becoming the first Generation Z woman elected to Congress and the second Generation Z member of Congress, after Maxwell Frost. She is also the first Black woman to represent Colorado in the House.

== Political positions ==
Kiros is a democratic socialist. She has pledged to refuse corporate political action committee (PAC) donations.

=== Economic policy ===
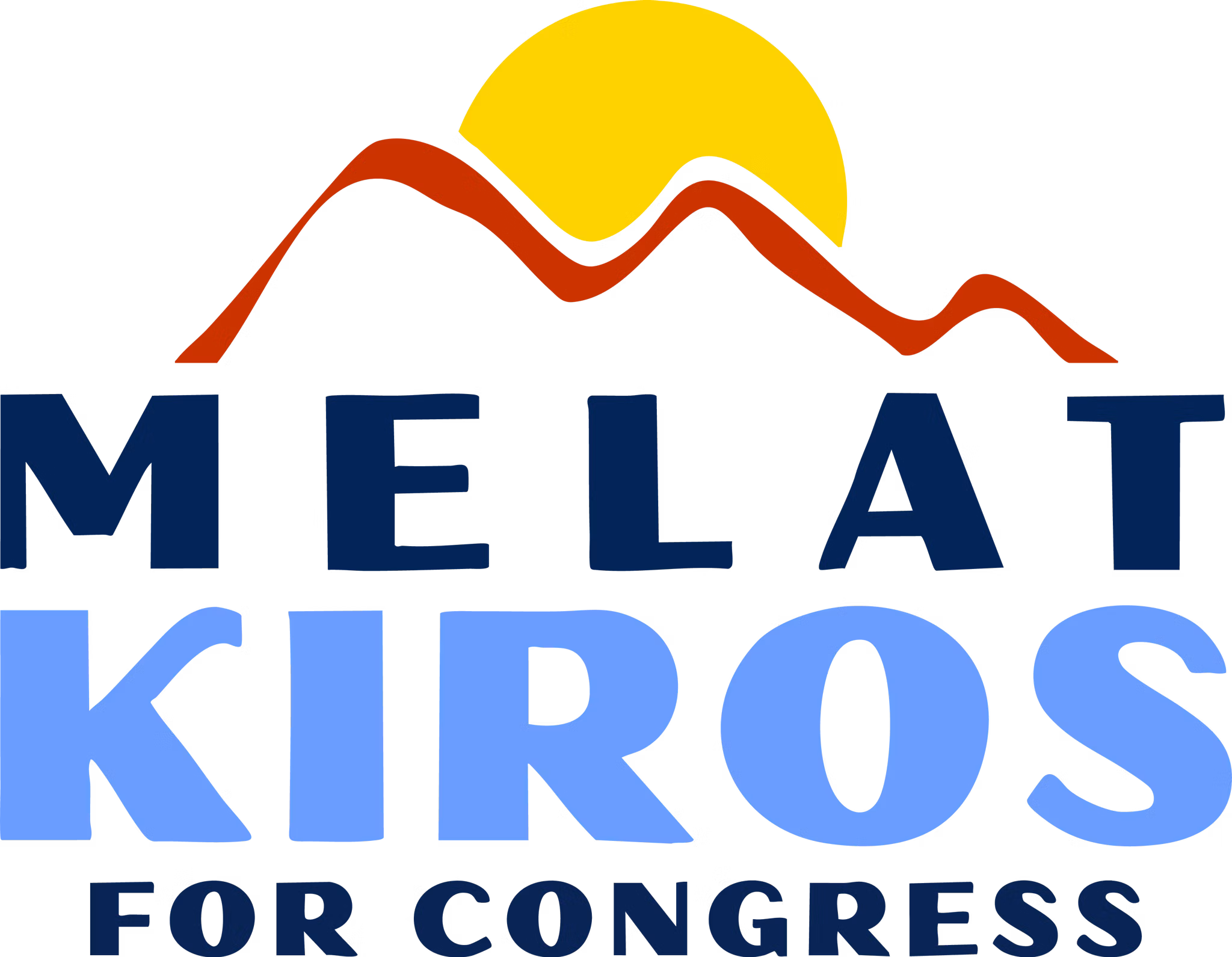
2026 congressional campaign logo

Kiros supports expanding public social programs in light of market disruption caused by artificial intelligence and automation.

Kiros supports raising the federal minimum wage to match local living costs, with a floor of at least $15 per hour, and has said it may need to be $22 per hour in some cities or districts. She supports closing tax loopholes and higher taxes on the "ultra wealthy".

On housing policy, Kiros supports upzoning and permitting reform, federal rent control, and social housing.

=== Environmental policy ===
Kiros supports a Green New Deal and argues that transportation policy should emphasize public transport and pedestrian-centered neighborhoods rather than relying mainly on electric vehicles. She supports a moratorium on data centers until federal labor and environmental regulations are in place, and said data-center companies should generate their own renewable energy.

=== Foreign policy ===
Kiros supports a 10% reduction in Pentagon spending, arguing that reducing the military budget would decrease incentives for defense contractors and the military-industrial complex to support war. She opposes continued U.S. military aid to Israel, calling Israel's actions in Gaza a genocide, and has called for a full U.S. arms embargo on Israel, including defensive weapons.

Kiros opposed U.S. military action against Iran, saying there was no security threat, and no indication that Iran was close to building nuclear weapons. She said she would support efforts to reclaim Congressional war powers from the president.

In September 2026, Kiros attended a protest ahead of a speech by Israeli prime minister Benjamin Netanyahu at the United Nations General Assembly.

=== Healthcare and childcare ===
Kiros supports Medicare for All, cancellation of medical debt, federal drug-price caps, and breaking up monopolies in the pharmaceutical, health insurance, and health-care provider sectors. She supports increased childcare subsidies, capping childcare costs at 10% of family income, and making childcare free for families below a certain income level.

=== Immigration ===
Kiros supports hiring more immigration judges, caseworkers, and border-processing staff to make the immigration system faster. She supports abolishing U.S. Immigration and Customs Enforcement and releasing people without criminal records from ICE detention.

== Notes ==
U.S. House of Representatives
Preceded by Diana DeGette	Member of the U.S. House of Representatives from Colorado's 1st congressional district Taking office 2027	Elect
