= 2026 United States House of Representatives elections in Wisconsin =

- November 3, 2026

All 8 Wisconsin seats to the United States House of Representatives
	Majority party	Minority party
Party	Democratic	Republican
Last election	2	6
Seats won	4	4
Seat change	▲2	▼2
Popular vote	1,454,885	1,106,269
Percentage	56.25%	42.77%
Swing	▲8.04%	▼8.40%

Democratic hold Democratic gain
Republican hold
Democratic
40–50%
50–60%
60–70%
70–80%
90–100%
Republican
50–60%
60–70%
70–80%

The 2026 United States House of Representatives elections in Wisconsin were held on November 3, 2026, to elect the eight U.S. representatives from the state of Wisconsin, one from each of the state's eight congressional districts. The elections coincided with other elections to the House of Representatives, elections to the United States Senate, and various state and local elections. The primary election took place on August 11, 2026. Wisconsin, Maine, and Montana will be the three states with evenly split congressional delegations following the 2026 House of Representatives elections, (4–4, 1–1, and 1–1 respectively).

Democrats won the 1st district for the first time since 1993.

== Background ==
In July 2025, a lawsuit was filed by two liberal law firms in a Wisconsin district court, asking to consider the constitutionality of Wisconsin's congressional maps. In September 2025, the Wisconsin Supreme court addressed this lawsuit and asked each party to provide briefs on whether this court case should proceed. On March 31, 2026, a judicial panel dismissed the challenge.

== District 1 ==
2026 Wisconsin's 1st congressional district election

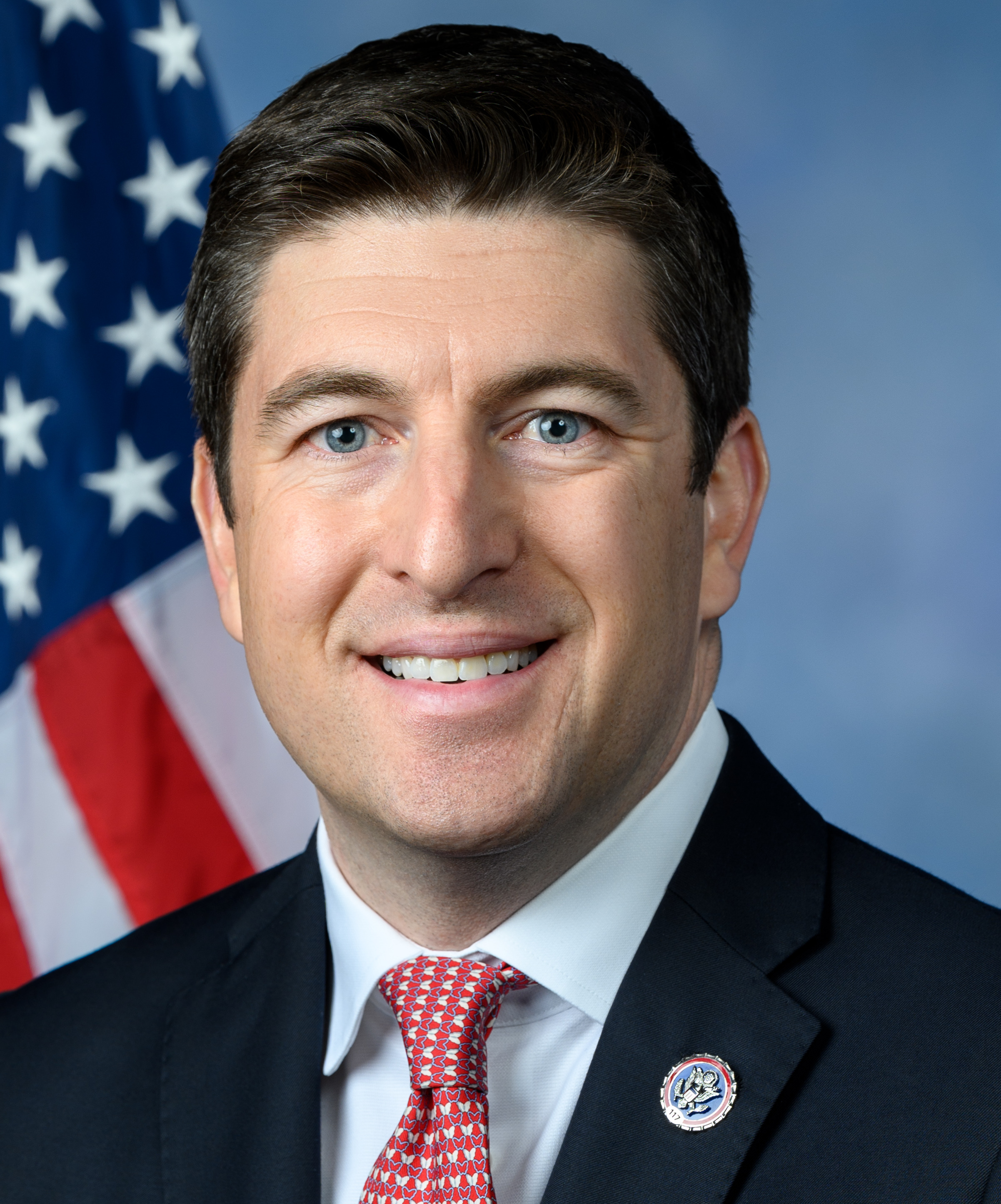
Nominee	Mitchell Berman	Bryan Steil
Party	Democratic	Republican
Popular vote	158,839	146,885
Percentage	52.0%	48.0%
- Berman: 50–60% Steil: 50–60%
U.S. representative before election
Bryan Steil
Republican
Elected U.S. representative
Mitchell Berman
Democratic

The 1st district encompasses the southeastern corner of Wisconsin, containing the cities of Beloit, Franklin, Janesville, Kenosha, Oak Creek, Racine, and most of Whitewater. The incumbent is Republican Bryan Steil, who was re-elected with 54.0% of the vote in 2024.

=== Republican primary ===
==== Nominee ====
- Bryan Steil, incumbent U.S. representative

==== Did not file ====
- Jose Vera
- Connor Walleck

==== Endorsements ====
Bryan Steil

Executive branch officials

- Donald Trump, president of the United States (2017–2021, 2025–present)

Organizations

- Log Cabin Republicans

==== Fundraising ====
Campaign finance reports as of March 31, 2026
Candidate	Raised	Spent	Cash on hand
Bryan Steil (R)	$4,376,364	$1,031,407	$5,564,127
Source: Federal Election Commission

==== Results ====
Republican primary results
Party	Candidate	Votes	%
Republican	Bryan Steil (incumbent)	50,915	99.60
Write-in		204	0.40
Total votes		51,119	100.0

=== Democratic primary ===
==== Nominee ====
- Mitchell Berman, nurse

==== Eliminated in primary ====
- Miguel Aranda, vice president of the Whitewater Unified School District
- Lorenzo Santos, emergency management professional and candidate for this district in 2024

==== Withdrawn ====
- Peter Burgelis, Milwaukee alderman (remained on ballot; endorsed Berman)
- Randy Bryce, political fundraiser and nominee for this district in 2018 (endorsed Berman)

==== Did not file ====
- Travis Beckius
- Enrique Casiano, chair of United Auto Workers Local 95's Unit 12
- Gage Stills, retail worker

==== Endorsements ====
Mitchell Berman

U.S. representatives

- Pat Ryan, NY-18 (2022–present)

State legislators

- 5 state assemblymembers (Note: Clinton Anderson, AD-45 (2023–present); Ben DeSmidt, AD-65 (2025–present); Tip McGuire, AD-64 (2019–present); Ann Roe, AD-44 (2025–present); Christine Sinicki, AD-20 (1999–present))
- Mark Spreitzer, SD-15 (2023–present)

Local officials

- Peter Burgelis, Milwaukee alderman and former candidate for this district

Individuals

- Randy Bryce, political fundraiser and former candidate for this district

Labor unions

- American Federation of Teachers Local 212
- United Auto Workers

Organizations

- End Citizens United
Randy Bryce (withdrawn)

Organizations

- Our Revolution

==== Fundraising ====
Campaign finance reports as of March 31, 2026
Candidate	Raised	Spent	Cash on hand
Miguel Aranda (D)	$7,722	$1,270	$12,831
Mitchell Berman (D)	$426,671	$286,071	$140,600
Lorenzo Santos (D)	$0	$373	$0
Source: Federal Election Commission

==== Results ====
County results: Berman: 30–40%; 40–50%

Precinct results: Berman: 20–30%; 30–40%; 40–50%; 50–60%; 60–70%; 80–90%; >90%; Burgelis: 30–40%; 40–50%; >90%; Santos: 30–40%; 40–50%; 50–60%; 60–70%; Aranda: 40–50%; 50–60%; >90%; Write-In: 100%; Tie: 20–30%; 30–40%; 50%; No Votes

Democratic primary results
Party	Candidate	Votes	%
Democratic	Mitchell Berman	31,494	44.11
Democratic	Peter Burgelis (withdrawn)	15,455	21.64
Democratic	Lorenzo Santos	14,590	20.43
Democratic	Miguel Aranda	9,701	13.59
Write-in		163	0.23
Total votes		71,403	100.0

=== General election ===
==== Predictions ====
Source	Ranking	As of
Decision Desk HQ	Lean R	July 14, 2026
The Cook Political Report	Lean R	September 25, 2026
Inside Elections	Lean R	October 29, 2026
Sabato's Crystal Ball	Lean R	October 8, 2026

==== Post-primary endorsements ====
Mitchell Berman (D)

U.S. representatives

- Suzan DelBene, WA-01 (2012–present)
- Adam Gray, CA-13 (2025–present)
- Greg Stanton, AZ-04 (2019–present)

Organizations

- Blue Dog PAC
- DCCC Red to Blue
- J Street
- NewDem Action Fund

==== Fundraising ====
Campaign finance reports as of October 14, 2026
Candidate	Raised	Spent	Cash on hand
Bryan Steil (R)	$6,393,553	$6,369,119	$2,243,605
Mitchell Berman (D)	$1,977,099	$1,625,541	$351,558
Source: Federal Election Commission

==== Polling ====
Poll source	Date(s) administered	Sample size (Note: Key: A – all adults RV – registered voters LV – likely voters V – unclear)	Margin of error	Bryan Steil (R)	Mitchell Berman (D)	Undecided
Impact Research (D) (Note: Poll sponsored by House Majority PAC, which is focused on electing Democrats to the U.S. House of Representatives)	September 28 – October 1, 2026	500 (LV)	–	47%	48%	5%
DCCC Analytics Department	September 21–23, 2026	495 (LV)	± 4.4%	48%	48%	5%
Impact Research (D) (Note: Poll sponsored by Berman's campaign)	August 6–9, 2026	400 (LV)	± 4.9%	49%	48%	4%
Ragnar Research Partners (R) (Note: Poll commissioned by Conservatives For America, an organization linked to the Republican Study Committee)	March 14–16, 2026	400 (LV)	± 5.0%	50%	41%	9%

Hypothetical polling

Generic Republican vs. generic Democrat

Poll source	Date(s) administered	Sample size	Margin of error	Generic Republican	Generic Democrat	Undecided
Impact Research (D)	September 28 – October 1, 2026	500 (LV)	–	48%	49%	3%
Ragnar Research Partners (R)	March 14–16, 2026	400 (LV)	± 5.0%	42%	44%	14%

== District 2 ==
2026 Wisconsin's 2nd congressional district election
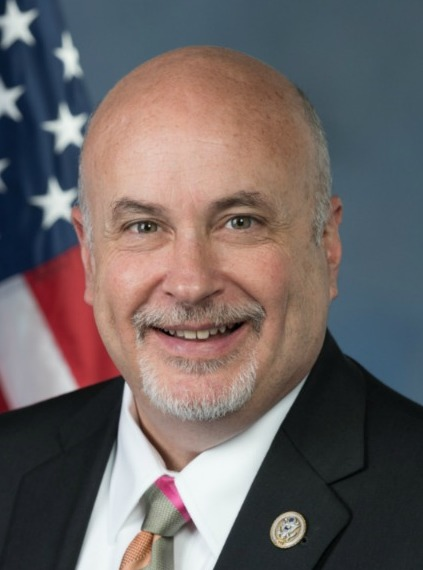
Nominee	Mark Pocan
Party	Democratic
U.S. Representative before election
Mark Pocan
Democratic
Elected U.S. Representative
Mark Pocan
Democratic

The 2nd district contains much of southern Wisconsin, including Madison, Monroe, Dodgeville, and Baraboo. The incumbent is Democrat Mark Pocan, who was reelected with 70.1% of the vote in 2024.

=== Democratic primary ===
==== Nominee ====
- Mark Pocan, incumbent U.S. representative

==== Eliminated in primary ====
- Douglas Alexander

==== Endorsements ====
Mark Pocan

Labor unions

- Wisconsin AFL-CIO

Organizations

- A New Policy
- Center for Freethought Equality
- Citizens Against AIPAC Corruption
- End Citizens United
- Equality PAC
- Fair Wisconsin
- Human Rights Campaign
- LGBTQ Victory Fund
- J Street
- Our Revolution
- Peace Action
- Planned Parenthood Action Fund
- Progressive Democrats of America
- Population Connection
- Sierra Club
- Track AIPAC

==== Fundraising ====
Campaign finance reports as of March 31, 2026
Candidate	Raised	Spent	Cash on hand
Mark Pocan (D)	$643,149	$672,984	$972,382
Source: Federal Election Commission

==== Results ====
Democratic primary results
Party	Candidate	Votes	%
Democratic	Mark Pocan (incumbent)	144,365	87.93
Democratic	Douglas Alexander	19,610	11.94
Write-in		208	0.13
Total votes		164,183	100.0

=== General election ===
==== Predictions ====
Source	Ranking	As of
Decision Desk HQ	Safe D	July 14, 2026
The Cook Political Report	Solid D	February 6, 2025
Inside Elections	Solid D	March 7, 2025
Sabato's Crystal Ball	Safe D	July 15, 2025

==== Post-primary endorsements ====
Mark Pocan (D)

Labor unions

- United Auto Workers

== District 3 ==
2026 Wisconsin's 3rd congressional district election
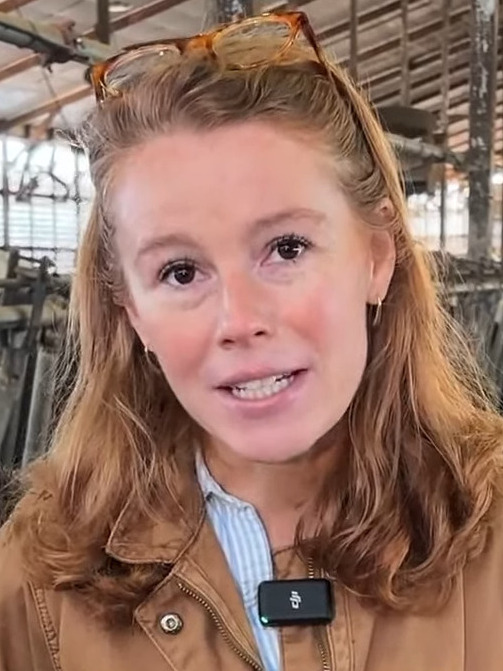

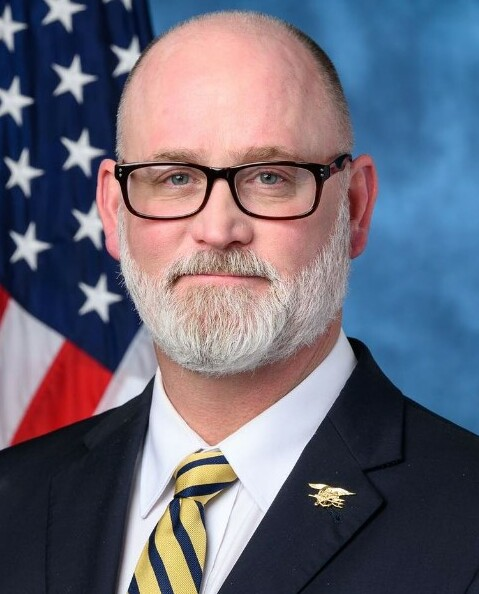
Nominee	Rebecca Cooke	Derrick Van Orden
Party	Democratic	Republican
Popular vote	172,757	150,873
Percentage	52.4%	45.8%
- Cooke: 40–50% 50–60% 60–70% Van Orden: 50–60%
U.S. representative before election
Derrick Van Orden
Republican
Elected U.S. representative
Rebecca Cooke
Democratic

The 3rd district takes in the Driftless Area in southwestern Wisconsin including Eau Claire and La Crosse. The incumbent is Republican Derrick Van Orden, who was re-elected with 51.4% of the vote in 2024.

The election was one of the most expensive congressional races in 2026, with over $31.6 million in spending.

=== Republican primary ===
==== Nominee ====
- Derrick Van Orden, incumbent U.S. representative

==== Endorsements ====
Derrick Van Orden

Executive branch officials

- Donald Trump, 45th and 47th president of the United States (2017–2021, 2025–present)
- JD Vance, vice president of the United States (2025–present)

U.S. representatives

- Mike Johnson, speaker of the House (2023–present) from LA-04 (2017–present)

Organizations

- Log Cabin Republicans
- Republican Jewish Coalition

==== Fundraising ====
Campaign finance reports as of June 30, 2026
Candidate	Raised	Spent	Cash on hand
Derrick Van Orden (R)	$7,289,146	$3,121,342	$4,684,610
Source: Federal Election Commission

==== Results ====
Republican primary results
Party	Candidate	Votes	%
Republican	Derrick Van Orden (incumbent)	56,948	99.00
Write-in		575	1.00
Total votes		57,523	100.0

=== Democratic primary ===
==== Nominee ====
- Rebecca Cooke, former Wisconsin Economic Development Corporation board member and nominee for this district in 2024

==== Eliminated in primary ====
- Emily Berge, former president of the Eau Claire city council

==== Withdrawn ====
- Laura Benjamin, former Eau Claire city councilor
- Rodney Rave, former Ho-Chunk Nation legislator (endorsed Berge)

==== Declined ====
- Brad Pfaff, state senator from the 32nd district (2021–present) and nominee for this district in 2022 (endorsed Cooke)
- Katrina Shankland, former state representative from the 71st district (2013–2025) and candidate for this district in 2024

==== Endorsements ====
Emily Berge

State legislators

- Tara Johnson, AD-96 (2025–present)
- Jeff Smith, SD-31 (2019–present)
- Dana Wachs, former AD-91 (2013–2019)

Local officials

- Rodney Rave, former Ho-Chunk Nation legislator and former candidate for this district

Individuals

- Kirk Bangstad, brewery owner and political candidate

Organizations

- Coulee Democratic Socialists of America
- Our Wisconsin Revolution
- Patriotic Millionaires
- Vote Common Good
- WI-03 Indivisible Coalition
Rebecca Cooke

Executive branch officials

- Pete Buttigieg, former secretary of transportation (2021–2025)

U.S. senators

- Tammy Baldwin, Wisconsin (2013–present)
- Bernie Sanders, Vermont (2007–present) (Independent)
- Elissa Slotkin, Michigan (2025–present)

U.S. representatives

- Yassamin Ansari, AZ-03 (2025–present)
- Don Beyer, VA-08 (2015–present)
- Nikki Budzinski, IL-13 (2023–present)
- Jason Crow, CO-06 (2019–present)
- Sharice Davids, KS-03 (2019–present)
- Suzan DelBene, WA-01 (2012–present)
- Maxine Dexter, OR-03 (2025–present)
- Jared Golden, ME-02 (2019–present)
- Ro Khanna, CA-17 (2017–present)
- Annie Kuster, former NH-02 (2013–2025)
- Susie Lee, NV-03 (2019–present)
- Ted Lieu, CA-36 (2015–present)
- Johnny Olszewski, MD-02 (2025–present)
- Scott Peters, CA-50 (2013–present)
- Linda Sanchez, CA-38 (2003–present)
- Adam Smith, WA-09 (1997–present)
- Melanie Stansbury, NM-01 (2021–present)
- Greg Stanton, AZ-04 (2019–present)
- Haley Stevens, MI-11 (2019–present)
- Eric Swalwell, former CA-14 (2013–2026) (rejected by candidate)
- Lori Trahan, MA-03 (2019–present)

State legislators

- Brad Pfaff, SD-32 (2021–present) and nominee for this district in 2022

Labor unions

- American Federation of State, County and Municipal Employees
- American Postal Workers Union of Wisconsin
- Association of Flight Attendants
- International Association of Sheet Metal, Air, Rail and Transportation Workers
- Communications Workers of America
- International Brotherhood of Electrical Workers Wisconsin State Conference
- International Union of Painters and Allied Trades District Councils 7 & 82
- Iron Workers Locals 383 & 512
- Wisconsin Laborers' District Council
- Office and Professional Employees International Union
- United Food and Commercial Workers Local 1473
- Wisconsin AFL-CIO
- Wisconsin Education Association Council
- Wisconsin State Council of Machinists

Organizations

- American Association for Justice
- Blue Dog Coalition
- Council for a Livable World
- DCCC Red to Blue
- EMILYs List
- End Citizens United
- Environmental Defense Fund
- Elect Democratic Women
- Giffords
- Human Rights Campaign
- Jewish Democratic Council of America
- J Street
- League of Conservation Voters
- National Committee to Preserve Social Security and Medicare
- National Women's Political Caucus
- Natural Resources Defense Council
- NewDem Action Fund
- Reproductive Freedom for All
- Social Security Works
- WelcomePAC

Newspapers

- The Shepherd Express

==== Fundraising ====
Italics indicate a withdrawn candidate.

Campaign finance reports as of July 22, 2026
Candidate	Raised	Spent	Cash on hand
Emily Berge (D)	$728,722	$622,758	$105,964
Rebecca Cooke (D)	$8,601,146	$6,784,680	$1,826,605
Source: Federal Election Commission

==== Polling ====
Poll source	Date(s) administered	Sample size	Margin of error	Emily Berge	Rebecca Cooke	Rodney Rave	Undecided
Impact Research (D) (Note: Poll sponsored by Cooke's campaign)	February 12–17, 2026	471 (LV)	± 4.6%	22%	65%	1%	12%

==== Results ====
Results by county Cooke: 50–60%; 60–70%; 70–80%; Berge: 50–60%

Results by precinct Cooke: 50–60% 60–70% 70–80% 80–90% >90%; Berge: 50–60% 60–70% >90%

Democratic primary results
Party	Candidate	Votes	%
Democratic	Rebecca Cooke	56,650	60.48
Democratic	Emily Berge	36,958	39.45
Write-in		65	0.07
Total votes		93,673	100.0

=== Independents ===
==== Declared ====
- Alexander Kent
- Rustin Provance, certified nursing assistant and candidate for this district in 2024

=== General election ===
==== Predictions ====
Source	Ranking	As of
Decision Desk HQ	Likely D (flip)	October 8, 2026
The Cook Political Report	Lean D (flip)	October 23, 2026
Inside Elections	Tilt D (flip)	October 29, 2026
Sabato's Crystal Ball	Lean D (flip)	October 20, 2026

==== Post-primary endorsements ====
Derrick Van Orden (R)

Organizations

- U.S. Chamber of Commerce
Rebecca Cooke (D)

Labor unions

- United Auto Workers

==== Fundraising ====
Campaign finance reports as of October 14, 2026
Candidate	Raised	Spent	Cash on hand
Derrick Van Orden (R)	$9,101,596	$8,452,731	$1,165,671
Rebecca Cooke (D)	$12,675,997	$12,238,749	$447,387
Source: Federal Election Commission

==== Polling ====
Poll source	Date(s) administered	Sample size	Margin of error	Derrick Van Orden (R)	Rebecca Cooke (D)	Undecided
FM3 Research (D) (Note: Poll commissioned by the House Majority PAC, which supports Cooke)	June 20–25, 2026	535 (LV)	± 4.4%	46%	50%	4%
Impact Research (D)	May 26–31, 2026	500 (LV)	± 4.4%	46%	50%	4%
Impact Research (D)	February 12–17, 2026	500 (LV)	± 4.4%	48%	49%	3%
Public Policy Polling (D)	October 14–15, 2025	609 (LV)	–	42%	44%	13%

Hypothetical polling

Generic Republican vs. Generic Democrat

Poll source	Date(s) administered	Sample size	Margin of error	Generic Republican	Generic Democrat	Undecided
Impact Research (D)	May 26–31, 2026	500 (LV)	± 4.4%	41%	44%	15%

== District 4 ==
2026 Wisconsin's 4th congressional district election
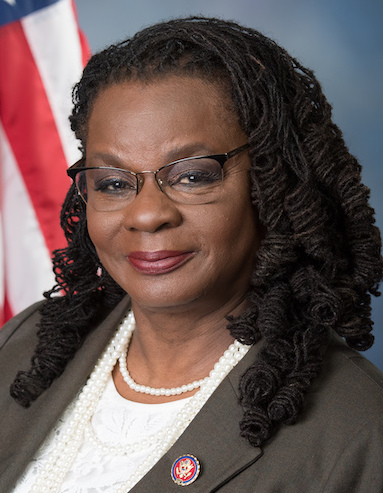

Nominee	Gwen Moore	Tim Rogers
Party	Democratic	Republican
Popular vote	211,898	46,301
Percentage	79.98%	17.5%
- Moore: 70–80%
U.S. Representative before election
Gwen Moore
Democratic
Elected U.S. Representative
Gwen Moore
Democratic

The 4th district encompasses Milwaukee County, taking in the city of Milwaukee and its working-class suburbs of West Milwaukee and most of West Allis, the middle to upper-class suburb of Wauwatosa, and the North Shore communities of Glendale, Shorewood, Whitefish Bay, Fox Point, Bayside, and Brown Deer. The incumbent is Democrat Gwen Moore, who was reelected with 74.8% of the vote in 2024.

=== Democratic primary ===
==== Nominee ====
- Gwen Moore, incumbent U.S. representative

==== Eliminated in primary ====
- Amy Donahue, genetic counselor

==== Endorsements ====
Gwen Moore

Labor unions

- Wisconsin AFL-CIO

Organizations

- Fair Wisconsin
- J Street
- Planned Parenthood Action Fund
- Sierra Club

Newspapers

- The Shepherd Express

==== Fundraising ====
Campaign finance reports as of March 31, 2026
Candidate	Raised	Spent	Cash on hand
Amy Donahue (D)	$5,672	$2,544	$3,128
Gwen Moore (D)	$844,348	$795,038	$71,558
Source: Federal Election Commission

==== Results ====
Precinct results: Moore: 50–60%; 60–70%; 70–80%; 80–90%; >90%; Donahue: 50–60%; 60–70%; 70–80%; Tie No Votes

Democratic primary results
Party	Candidate	Votes	%
Democratic	Gwen Moore (incumbent)	81,707	71.92
Democratic	Amy Donahue	31,707	27.91
Write-in		199	0.18
Total votes		113,613	100.0

=== Republican primary ===
==== Nominee ====
- Tim Rogers, perennial candidate

==== Eliminated in primary ====
- Purnima Nath, engineer and perennial candidate

==== Fundraising ====
Campaign finance reports as of March 31, 2026
Candidate	Raised	Spent	Cash on hand
Purnima Nath (R)	$0	$1,441	$5,168
Source: Federal Election Commission

==== Results ====
Precinct results: Rogers: 50–60%; 60–70%; 70–80%; 80–90%; >90%; Nath: 50–60%; 60–70%; >90%; Tie: 30–40%; 50%; No Votes

Republican primary results
Party	Candidate	Votes	%
Republican	Tim Rogers	10,079	80.76
Republican	Purnima Nath	2,356	18.88
Write-in		45	0.36
Total votes		12,480	100.0

=== Independents ===
==== Declared ====
- Arthur Burks

=== General election ===
==== Predictions ====
Source	Ranking	As of
Decision Desk HQ	Safe D	July 14, 2026
The Cook Political Report	Solid D	February 6, 2025
Inside Elections	Solid D	March 7, 2025
Sabato's Crystal Ball	Safe D	July 15, 2025

==== Post-primary endorsements ====
Gwen Moore (D)

Labor unions

- United Auto Workers

== District 5 ==
2026 Wisconsin's 5th congressional district election
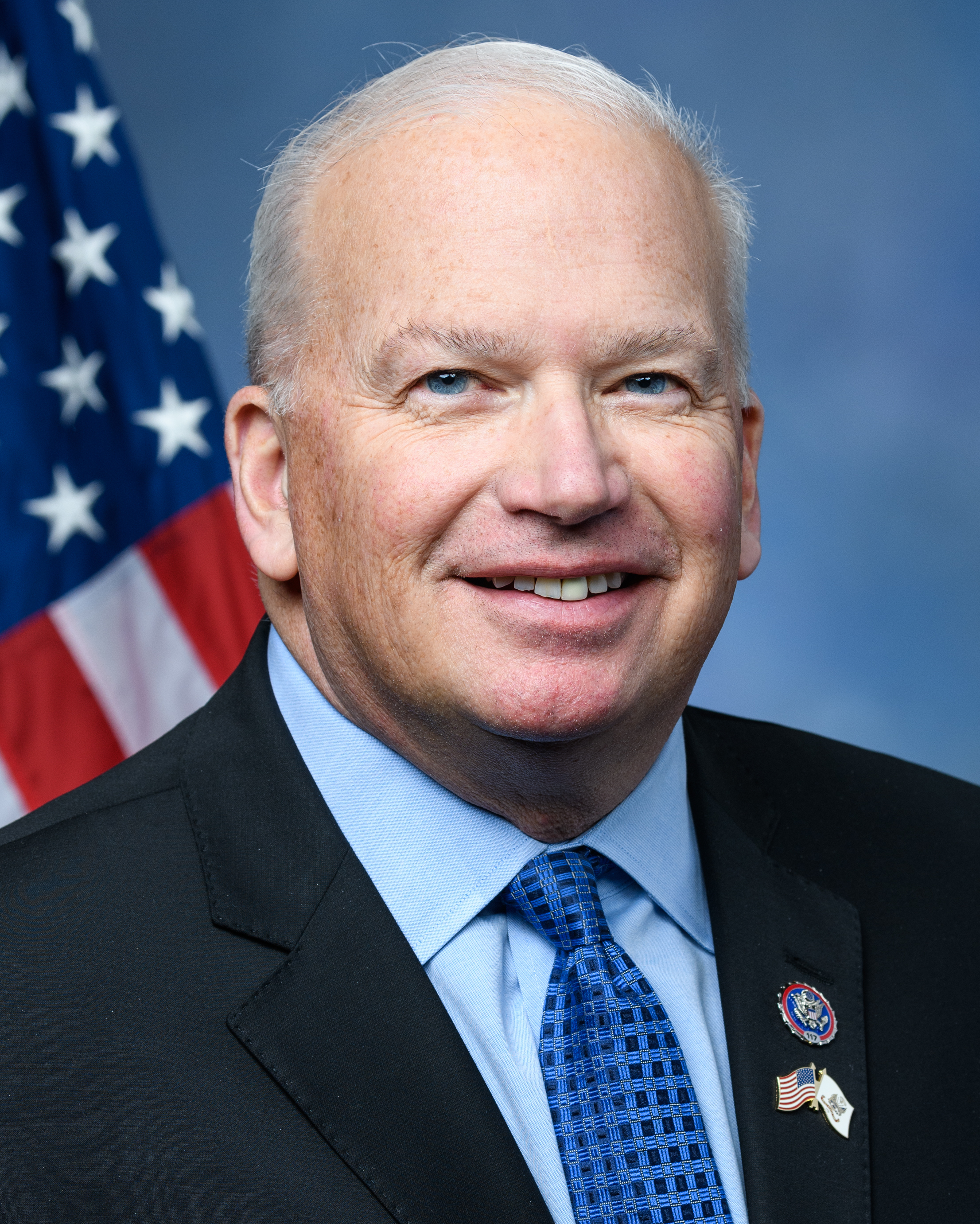

Nominee	Scott Fitzgerald	Andrew Beck
Party	Republican	Democratic
Popular vote	220,991	153,277
Percentage	59.0%	41.0%
- Fitzgerald: 50–60% 60–70% Beck: 50–60%
U.S. Representative before election
Scott Fitzgerald
Republican
Elected U.S. Representative
Scott Fitzgerald
Republican

The 5th district takes in the northern and western suburbs of Milwaukee, including Washington County, Jefferson County, as well as most of Waukesha County. The incumbent is Republican Scott Fitzgerald, who was reelected with 64.4% of the vote in 2024.

=== Republican primary ===
==== Nominee ====
- Scott Fitzgerald, incumbent U.S. representative

==== Endorsements ====
Scott Fitzgerald

Executive branch officials

- Donald Trump, 45th and 47th president of the United States (2017–2021, 2025–present)

==== Fundraising ====
Campaign finance reports as of March 31, 2026
Candidate	Raised	Spent	Cash on hand
Scott Fitzgerald (R)	$1,058,656	$432,835	$1,463,426
Source: Federal Election Commission

==== Results ====
Republican primary results
Party	Candidate	Votes	%
Republican	Scott Fitzgerald (incumbent)	76,702	99.74
Write-in		202	0.26
Total votes		76,904	100.0

=== Democratic primary ===
==== Nominee ====
- Andrew Beck, product developer

==== Did not file ====
- Ben Steinhoff, paramedic and nominee for this district in 2024

==== Endorsements ====
Andrew Beck

Labor unions

- Wisconsin AFL-CIO

==== Fundraising ====
Campaign finance reports as of March 31, 2026
Candidate	Raised	Spent	Cash on hand
Andrew Beck (D)	$6,320	$5,158	$1,297
Source: Federal Election Commission

==== Results ====
Democratic primary results
Party	Candidate	Votes	%
Democratic	Andrew Beck	64,504	99.72
Write-in		184	0.28
Total votes		64,688	100.0

=== General election ===
==== Predictions ====
Source	Ranking	As of
Decision Desk HQ	Safe R	July 14, 2026
The Cook Political Report	Solid R	February 6, 2025
Inside Elections	Solid R	March 7, 2025
Sabato's Crystal Ball	Safe R	July 15, 2025

==== Post-primary endorsements ====
Andrew Beck (D)

Labor unions

- United Auto Workers

== District 6 ==
2026 Wisconsin's 6th congressional district election
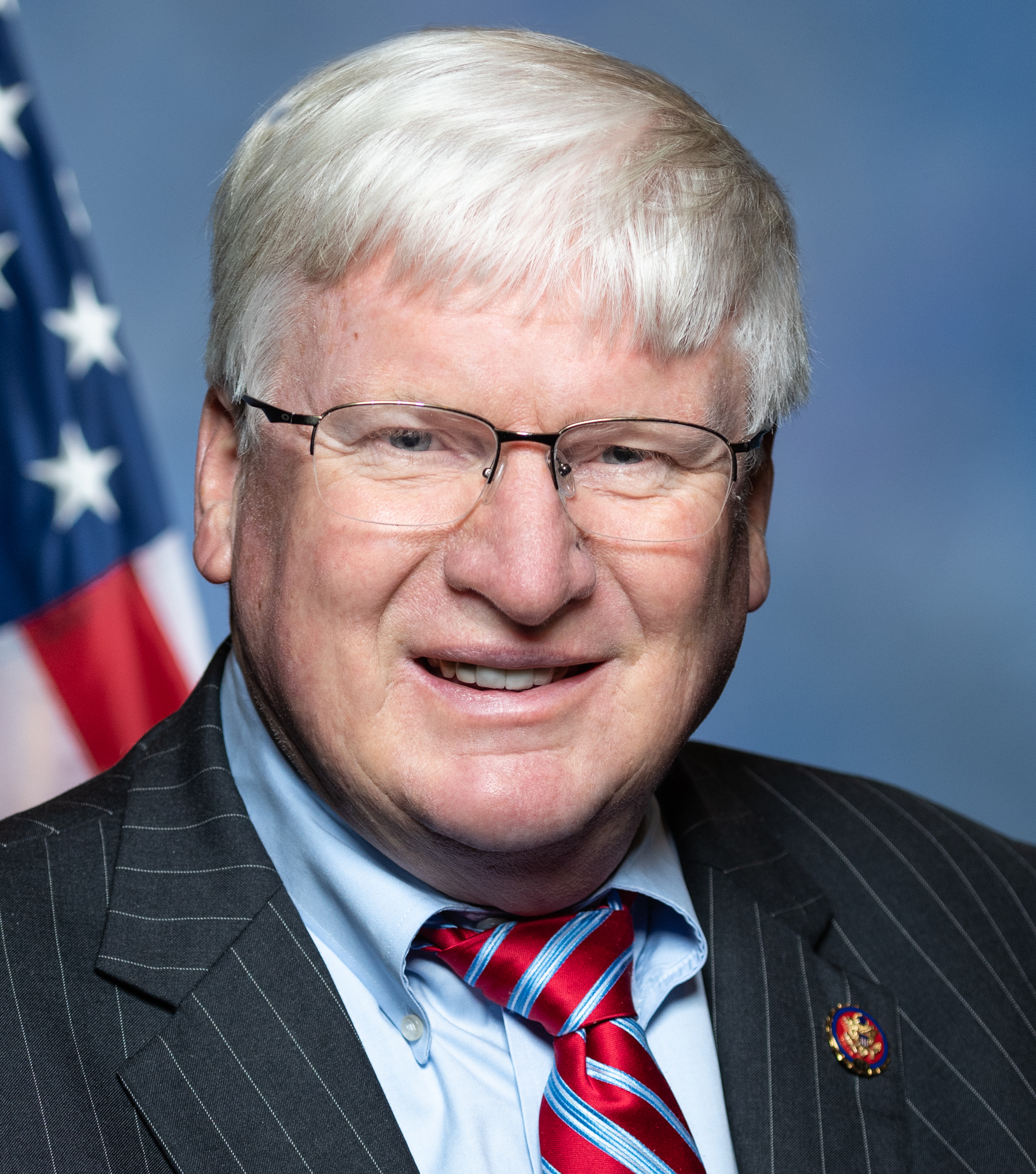

Nominee	Glenn Grothman	Brad Smith
Party	Republican	Democratic
Popular vote	172,138	141,346
Percentage	52.8%	43.3%
- Grothman: 50–60% 60–70% Smith: 50–60%
U.S. Representative before election
Glenn Grothman
Republican
Elected U.S. Representative
Glenn Grothman
Republican

The 6th district is based in east-central Wisconsin, encompassing part of the Fox River Valley, and takes in Fond du Lac, Oshkosh, and Sheboygan. The incumbent is Republican Glenn Grothman, who was reelected with 61.2% of the vote in 2024.

=== Republican primary ===
==== Nominee ====
- Glenn Grothman, incumbent U.S. representative

==== Endorsements ====
Glenn Grothman

Executive branch officials

- Donald Trump, 45th and 47th president of the United States (2017–2021, 2025–present)

==== Fundraising ====
Campaign finance reports as of June 30, 2026
Candidate	Raised	Spent	Cash on hand
Glenn Grothman (R)	$865,240	$584,127	$803,602
Source: Federal Election Commission

==== Results ====
Republican primary results
Party	Candidate	Votes	%
Republican	Glenn Grothman (incumbent)	63,462	99.68
Write-in		206	0.32
Total votes		63,668	100.0

=== Democratic primary ===
==== Nominee ====
- Brad Smith, businessman

==== Eliminated in primary ====
- Amanda Bell, former U.S. Geological Survey Center operations officer

==== Withdrawn ====
- Michael Heidenreich, paint store owner
- Aaron Wojciechowski, former Oshkosh city councilor
- Joey Marschall, bartender (running for state assembly)

==== Did not file ====
- Kelly Brown, business owner
- John Macho, minister and former U.S. Army officer
- Kortney Oldham

==== Endorsements ====
Amanda Bell

Organizations

- National Women's Political Caucus
Brad Smith

State legislators

- Kristin Dassler-Alfheim, SD-18 (2025–present)
- Jodi Habush Sinykin, SD-08 (2025–present)

Labor unions

- National Education Association
- Wisconsin Education Association Council
Aaron Wojciechowski (withdrawn)

Organizations

- Track AIPAC

==== Fundraising ====
Campaign finance reports as of June 30, 2026
Candidate	Raised	Spent	Cash on hand
Amanda Bell (D)	$40,119	$36,223	$3,896
Brad Smith (D)	$155,415	$71,104	$84,310
Source: Federal Election Commission

==== Results ====
Results by county Smith: 50–60%; 60–70%; Bell: 50–60%; 60–70%

Results by precinct Smith: 50–60%; 60–70%; 70–80%; 80–90%; >90%; Bell: 40–50%; 50–60%; 60–70%; 70–80%; 80–90%; >90%

Democratic primary results
Party	Candidate	Votes	%
Democratic	Brad Smith	36,413	50.18
Democratic	Amanda Bell	36,046	49.67
Write-in		109	0.15
Total votes		72,568	100.0

=== Green primary ===
==== Declared ====
- Matthew Arndt, business owner

=== Independents ===
==== Declared ====
- Elizabeth Fitzgibbon
- Michael Thurow, firefighter

==== Fundraising ====
Campaign finance reports as of June 30, 2026
Candidate	Raised	Spent	Cash on hand
Michael Thurow (I)	$154,864	$89,777	$66,691
Source: Federal Election Commission

=== General election ===
==== Predictions ====
Source	Ranking	As of
Decision Desk HQ	Likely R	July 14, 2026
The Cook Political Report	Solid R	February 6, 2025
Inside Elections	Solid R	March 7, 2025
Sabato's Crystal Ball	Safe R	July 15, 2025

==== Endorsements ====
Elizabeth Fitzgibbon (I)

Political parties

- Libertarian Party
Michael Thurow (I)

Individuals

- Dan Osborn, former president of Bakery, Confectionery, Tobacco Workers and Grain Millers' International Union

Labor unions

- International Association of Fire Fighters Local 215
- Professional Fire Fighters of Wisconsin
- United Auto Workers Wisconsin State CAP Council

Political parties

- Forward Party

==== Polling ====
Poll source	Date(s) administered	Sample size	Margin of error	Glenn Grothman (R)	Brad Smith (D)
Tavern Research (D)	May 18–28, 2026	437 (LV)	± 6.0%	61%	39%

Hypothetical polling

Glenn Grothman vs. generic Democrat

Poll source	Date(s) administered	Sample size	Margin of error	Glenn Grothman (R)	Generic Democrat
Tavern Research (D)	May 18–28, 2026	437 (LV)	± 6.0%	61%	39%

Glenn Grothman vs. Michael Thurow

Poll source	Date(s) administered	Sample size	Margin of error	Glenn Grothman (R)	Michael Thurow (I)	Other	Undecided
Tavern Research (D)	May 18–28, 2026	437 (LV)	± 6.0%	55%	45%	–	–
Change Research (D) (Note: Poll sponsored by Independent Candidate Action, which supports Thurow)	March 17–20, 2026	640 (LV)	± 4.2%	42%	38%	2% (Note: "Would not vote" with 2%)	18%

== District 7 ==
2026 Wisconsin's 7th congressional district election
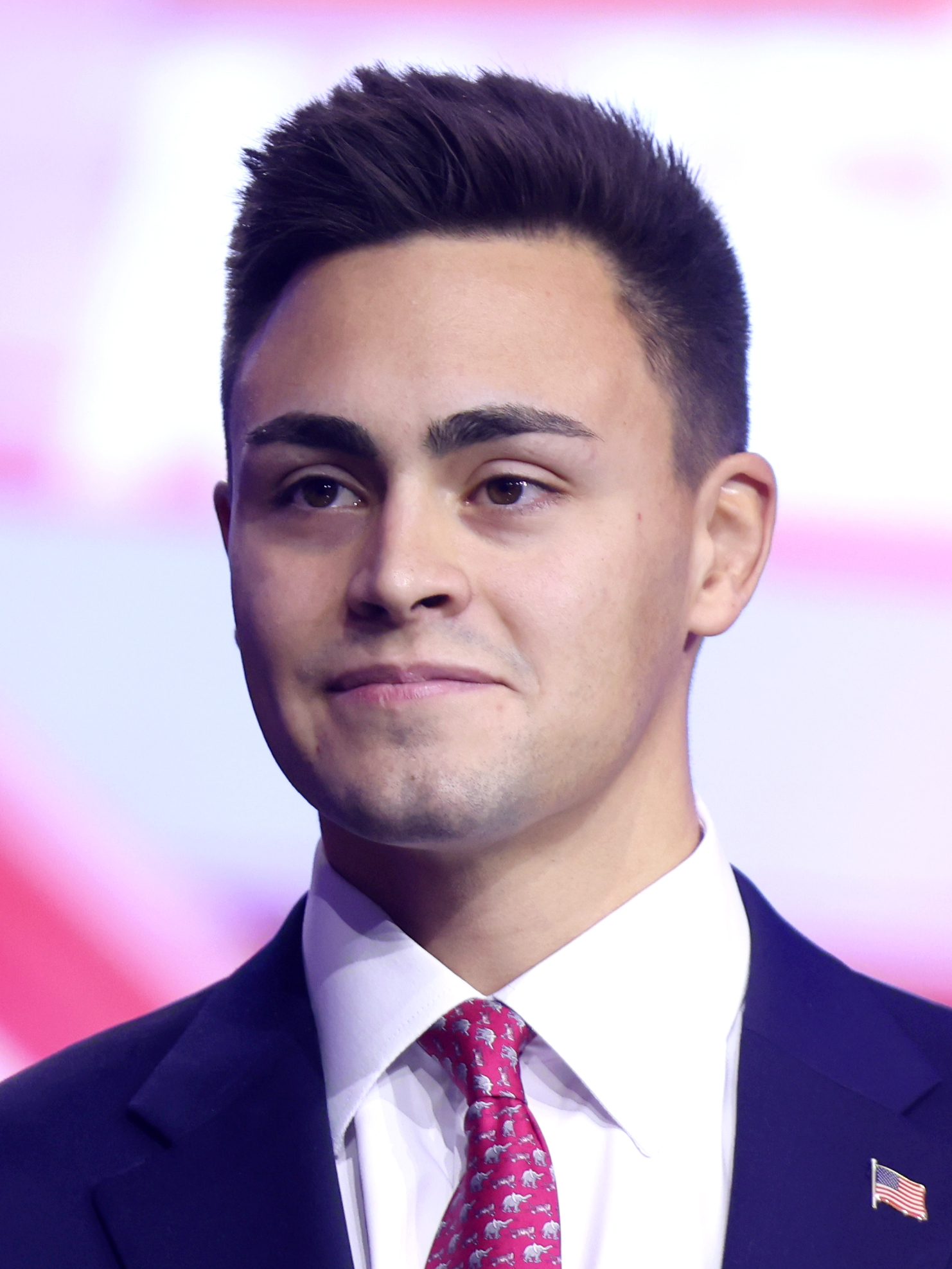

Nominee	Michael Alfonso	Fred Clark
Party	Republican	Democratic
Popular vote	191,822	148,172
Percentage	56.4%	43.6%
- Alfonso: 50–60% 60–70% 70–80% Clark: 50–60% 60–70%
U.S. Representative before election
Tom Tiffany
Republican
Elected U.S. Representative
Michael Alfonso
Republican

The 7th district is located in northwestern Wisconsin and includes Wausau and Superior. The incumbent Republican Tom Tiffany, who was reelected with 63.6% of the vote in 2024. Tiffany is not seeking re-election, instead choosing to run for governor.

=== Republican primary ===
==== Nominee ====
- Michael Alfonso, media producer and son-in-law of Secretary of Transportation Sean Duffy

==== Eliminated in primary ====
- Niina Baum, business owner
- Jessi Ebben, public relations professional and candidate for the 3rd district in 2020
- Kevin Hermening, former chair of the Marathon County Republican Party and hostage during the Iran hostage crisis
- Don Raihala, construction contractor

==== Withdrawn ====
- Paul Wassgren, attorney

==== Declined ====
- Calvin Callahan, state representative from the 35th district (2021–present) (running for re-election)
- Mary Felzkowski, president of the Wisconsin Senate (2025–present) from the 12th district (2021–present)
- Paul Schecklman, economic development business owner
- Rob Swearingen, state representative from the 34th district (2023–present) (running for re-election)
- Tom Tiffany, incumbent U.S. representative (running for governor)

==== Endorsements ====
Michael Alfonso

Executive branch officials

- Donald Trump, 45th and 47th president of the United States (2017–2021, 2025–present)
- Sean Duffy, secretary of transportation (2025–present) (candidate's father-in-law)

U.S. representatives

- Mike Johnson, speaker of the House (2023–present) from LA-04 (2017–present)
- Steve Scalise, House majority leader (2023–present) from LA-01 (2008–present)
- Tom Emmer, House majority whip (2023–present) from MN-06 (2015–present)
- Bryan Steil, WI-01 (2019–present)
- Derrick Van Orden, WI-03 (2023–present)
- Scott Fitzgerald, WI-05 (2021–present)
- Tony Wied, WI-08 (2024–present)
- Brandon Gill, TX-26 (2025–present)

State legislators

- Shannon Zimmerman, state assemblymember from the 30th district (2017–present)

Organizations

- Turning Point Action
Niina Baum

Political parties

- Forward Party
Jessi Ebben

U.S. representatives

- Eric Burlison, MO-07 (2023–present)
- Virginia Foxx, NC-05 (2005–present)
- Anna Paulina Luna, FL-13 (2023–present)
- David McIntosh, former IN-02 (1995–2001)

Statewide officials

- Dan Meyer, former secretary of the Wisconsin Department of Natural Resources (2017–2019)

Organizations

- Club for Growth
Kevin Hermening

State legislators

- Brent Jacobson, state assemblymember from the 87th district (2025–present)
- Romaine Quinn, state senator from the 25th district (2023–present)
- Patrick Snyder, state assemblymember from the 85th district (2017–present)

==== Fundraising ====
Campaign finance reports as of July 22, 2026
Candidate	Raised	Spent	Cash on hand
Michael Alfonso (R)	$1,351,546	$688,138	$663,408
Jessi Ebben (R)	$528,023	$235,172	$294,453
Kevin Hermening (R)	$1,180,818	$974,536	$206,282
Source: Federal Election Commission

==== Polling ====
Poll source	Date(s) administered	Sample size	Margin of error	Michael Alfonso	Jessi Ebben	Kevin Hermening	Niina Baum	Undecided
TIPP Insights (R) (Note: Poll sponsored by League of American Workers)	April 28 – May 1, 2026	301 (RV)	± 6.0%	35%	5%	21%	5%	34%

==== Debate ====
2026 Wisconsin's 7th congressional district Republican primary debate
No.	Date	Host	Moderator(s)	Link	Republican	Republican	Republican	Republican
Key: P Participant A Absent N Not invited I Invited W Withdrawn								
Key: P Participant A Absent N Not invited I Invited W Withdrawn					Michael Alfonso	Niina Baum	Jessi Ebben	Kevin Hermening
1	July 7, 2026	WJFW-TV	Dan Hagen	Youtube	P	P	P	P

==== Results ====
County results: Alfonso: 40–50%; 50–60%; 60–70%

Precinct results: Alfonso: 30–40%; 40–50%; 50–60%; 60–70%; 70–80%; 80–90%; >90%; Martin: 30–40%; 40–50%; 50–60%; 60–70%; >90%; Ebben: 30–40%; 40–50%; 80–90%; Baum: 30–40%; 40–50%; 50–60%; 60–70%; Tie: 30–40%; 40–50%; 50%; No Votes

Republican primary results
Party	Candidate	Votes	%
Republican	Michael Alfonso	49,720	48.96
Republican	Kevin Hermening	27,009	26.59
Republican	Jessi Ebben	15,937	15.69
Republican	Niina Baum	4,893	4.82
Republican	Don Raihala	3,926	3.87
Write-in		73	0.07
Total votes		101,558	100.0

=== Democratic primary ===
==== Nominee ====
- Fred Clark, former state representative from the 81st district (Note: Numbered as the 42nd district prior to the 2010 redistricting cycle.) (2009–2015) and nominee for Wisconsin's 14th Senate district in 2011

==== Eliminated in primary ====
- Chris Armstrong, business owner
- Ginger Murray, attorney

==== Endorsements ====
Chris Armstrong

Organizations

- Center for Freethought Equality
Fred Clark

U.S. representatives

- Dave Obey, former WI-07 (1969–2011)
- Mark Pocan, WI-02 (2013–present)

==== Fundraising ====
Campaign finance reports as of March 31, 2026
Candidate	Raised	Spent	Cash on hand
Chris Armstrong (D)	$31,323	$27,938	$3,384
Fred Clark (D)	$275,258	$118,042	$157,215
Ginger Murray (D)	$115,003	$30,590	$84,412
Source: Federal Election Commission

==== Results ====
County results: Clark: 30–40%; 40–50%; 50–60%; 70–80%; Murray: 30–40%; 40–50%; 50–60%; Armstrong: 30–40%; 40–50%

Precinct results: Clark: 30–40%; 40–50%; 50–60%; 60–70%; 70–80%; 80–90%; >90%; Murray: 30–40%; 40–50%; 50–60%; 60–70%; 70–80%; >90%; Armstrong: 30–40%; 40–50%; 50–60%; 60–70%; 70–80%; 80–90%; >90%; Tie: 30–40%; 40–50%; 50%; No Votes

Democratic primary results
Party	Candidate	Votes	%
Democratic	Fred Clark	25,716	37.66
Democratic	Ginger Murray	21,726	31.82
Democratic	Chris Armstrong	20,764	30.41
Write-in		76	0.11
Total votes		68,282	100.0

=== General election ===
==== Predictions ====
Source	Ranking	As of
Decision Desk HQ	Likely R	October 30, 2026
The Cook Political Report	Solid R	February 6, 2025
Inside Elections	Solid R	March 7, 2025
Sabato's Crystal Ball	Safe R	July 15, 2025

==== Post-primary endorsements ====
Fred Clark (D)

Labor unions

- United Auto Workers

== District 8 ==
2026 Wisconsin's 8th congressional district election
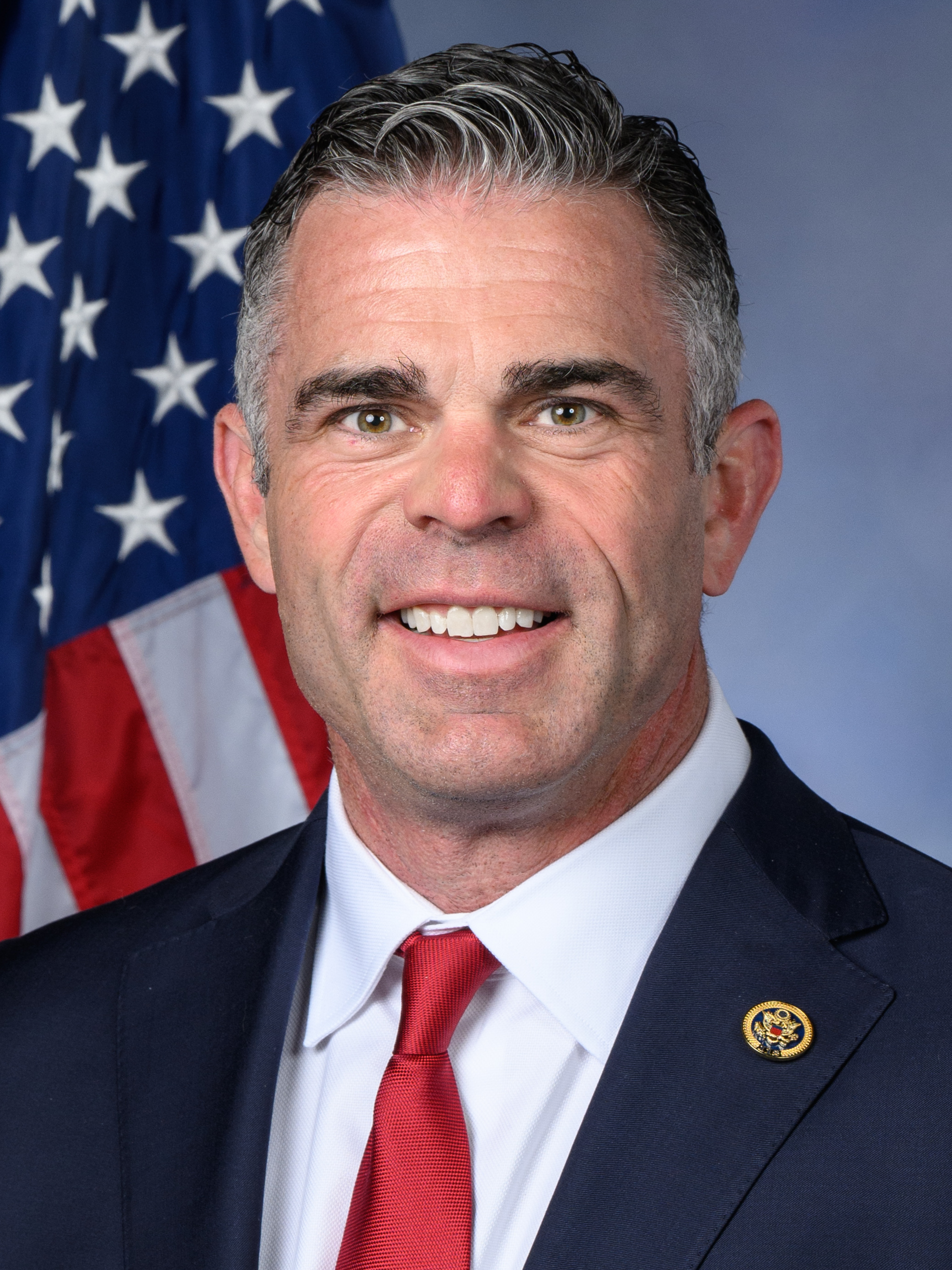

Nominee	Tony Wied	Rick Crosson
Party	Republican	Democratic
Popular vote	177,258	151,471
Percentage	53.9%	46.1%
- Wied: 50–60% 60–70% Crosson: 50–60% 70–80%
U.S. Representative before election
Tony Wied
Republican
Elected U.S. Representative
Tony Wied
Republican

The 8th district encompasses northeastern Wisconsin, including Green Bay and Appleton. The incumbent is Republican Tony Wied, who was elected with 57.3% of the vote in 2024.

=== Republican primary ===
==== Nominee ====
- Tony Wied, incumbent U.S. representative

==== Endorsements ====
Tony Wied

Executive branch officials

- Donald Trump, 45th and 47th president of the United States (2017–2021, 2025–present)

==== Fundraising ====
Campaign finance reports as of March 31, 2026
Candidate	Raised	Spent	Cash on hand
Tony Wied (R)	$831,540	$449,391	$427,379
Source: Federal Election Commission

==== Results ====
Republican primary results
Party	Candidate	Votes	%
Republican	Tony Wied (incumbent)	63,211	99.78
Write-in		137	0.22
Total votes		63,348	100.0

=== Democratic primary ===
==== Nominee ====
- Rick Crosson, former Green Bay school board member (2024–2025)

==== Eliminated in primary ====
- Katrina DeVille, musician
- Mark Scheffler, financial advisor

==== Did not file ====
- Benjamin Hable, former electrical engineer

==== Endorsements ====
Katrina DeVille

Organizations

- Northeast Wisconsin Democratic Socialists of America
Mark Scheffler

Organizations

- Center for Freethought Equality

==== Fundraising ====
Campaign finance reports as of March 31, 2026
Candidate	Raised	Spent	Cash on hand
Rick Crosson (D)	$23,772	$10,981	$15,588
Mark Scheffler (D)	$91,546	$73,626	$17,919
Source: Federal Election Commission

==== Results ====
County results: Crosson: 30–40%; 40–50%; Scheffler: 30–40%; 40–50%

Precinct results: Crosson: 30–40%; 40–50%; 50–60%; 60–70%; >90%; Scheffler: 30–40%; 40–50%; 50–60%; 60–70%; DeVille: 30–40%; 40–50%; 50–60%; 60–70%; >90%; Tie: 30–40%; 40–50%; No Votes

Democratic primary results
Party	Candidate	Votes	%
Democratic	Rick Crosson	24,970	35.24
Democratic	Mark Scheffler	23,392	33.01
Democratic	Katrina DeVille	22,405	31.62
Write-in		88	0.12
Total votes		70,855	100.0

=== General election ===
==== Predictions ====
Source	Ranking	As of
Decision Desk HQ	Likely R	July 14, 2026
The Cook Political Report	Solid R	February 6, 2025
Inside Elections	Solid R	March 7, 2025
Sabato's Crystal Ball	Safe R	July 15, 2025

==== Post-primary endorsements ====
Rick Crosson (D)

Labor unions

- United Auto Workers
Tony Wied (R)

Organizations

- U.S. Chamber of Commerce

== Notes ==
Partisan clients
