= Michael Alfonso (politician) =

American politician (born 2000)

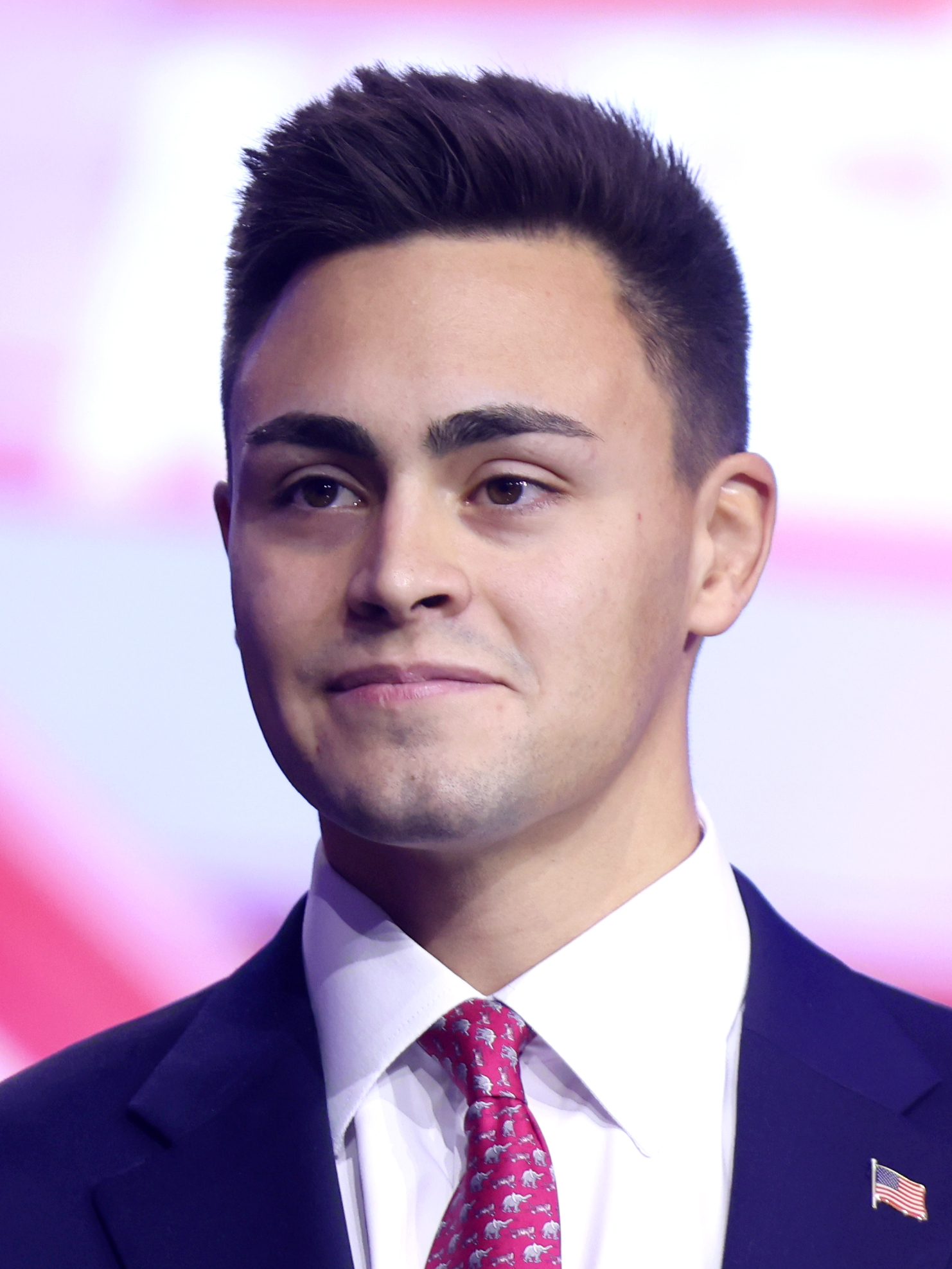
- Alfonso in 2025

Member-elect of the U.S. House of Representatives from Wisconsin's 7th district
- Assuming office January 3, 2027
- Succeeding: Tom Tiffany

Personal details
- Born: Michael Oliver Alfonso; February 18, 2000 (age 26) Vilas County, Wisconsin, U.S.
- Party: Republican
- Spouse: Evita Duffy
- Children: 1
- Relatives: Rachel Campos-Duffy (mother-in-law); Sean Duffy (father-in-law)
- Education: University of Wisconsin, Madison (BS)
- Website: Campaign website

Michael Oliver Alfonso (born February 18, 2000) is an American politician who is a member-elect of the United States House of Representatives for Wisconsin's 7th congressional district. A member of the Republican Party, he won the election for the seat in 2026.

== Early life ==
Michael Oliver Alfonso was born in February 2000 in Vilas County, Wisconsin, and was raised in the Wausau area. He is the grandson of refugees who left Cuba. He was educated at Newman Catholic High School in Wausau, where he met his eventual wife, Evita Duffy. After graduating alongside Duffy in 2018, Alfonso attended the University of Wisconsin–Madison, receiving a bachelor's degree in mathematics in 2022. Alfonso said that he worked "10-hour days building houses, paving roads, and laying concrete" in order to pay his tuition at the university.

After graduating from college, Alfonso relocated to Florida. There, he served as a producer for The Dan Bongino Show, a podcast run by Dan Bongino, who served as Deputy Director of the FBI. Alfonso held this role for a year. He later registered to vote using the address of a vacation home near Hayward, Wisconsin that is owned by his in-laws, Sean Duffy and Rachel Campos-Duffy, 10 days before receiving President Donald Trump's endorsement in the race for Wisconsin's 7th congressional district. There, he said he served as an accountant at a parish.

== U.S. House of Representatives ==
=== Elections ===
==== 2026 ====
In October 2025, Alfonso declared his candidacy for the United States House of Representatives for Wisconsin's 7th congressional district as a member of the Republican Party. Sean Duffy, his father-in-law, had held the seat from 2011 to 2019. Alfonso called himself a "pro-Trump conservative". He sought to succeed Tom Tiffany, who entered the gubernatorial race. He cited Charlie Kirk as a reason he entered politics. In the Republican primary, Alfonso faced off against four others, including former Iran hostage Kevin Hermening. In January 2026, he was endorsed by Trump, who declared Alfonso to be a "MAGA warrior" and "young 'STAR'". As of July 2026, he had raised over $12 million, the most among candidates in the district, and $2,500 of it was from the "Air Space Intelligence Inc PAC." In June 2026, Sean Duffy announced in a news release that Air Space Intelligence Inc. would lead efforts by the Federal Aviation Administration to expand its AI-assisted traffic planning platform (the Strategic Management of Airspace, Routes and Trajectories (SMART) system) to airspace managed by all 22 U.S. Air Route Area control centers.

His father-in-law's congressional campaign account made a $1 million contribution to Alfonso's campaign. Alfonso’s campaign also received contributions from companies and groups with business in front of his father-in-law’s agency: $5,000 from Delta Air Lines PAC, $2,500 from Southwest Airlines PAC, $2,000 from Lockheed Martin Corporation Employees' PAC, and $1,000 from the U.S. Travel Association PAC. Hermening, one of his primary opponents, said the race was a classic case of political nepotism. Duffy appeared at least three times at fundraising events for his son-in-law. Alfonso won the Republican primary on August 11, receiving 49% of the vote. His closest competitor was Hermening, with 26.6%.

In the general election, Alfonso ran against Democratic candidate Fred Clark and won with about 56% of the vote. When he assumes office, he will be the youngest member of Congress, as well as the first born in the 2000s.

== Personal life ==
Alfonso is married to Evita Duffy, daughter of Sean Duffy, who served in the U.S. House of Representatives for Wisconsin's 7th congressional district from 2011 to 2019 and later was appointed U.S. Transportation Secretary in the second Donald Trump administration. He met his wife while attending Newman Catholic High School and married at age 22. In May 2026, the couple had their first child.

U.S. House of Representatives
Preceded by Tom Tiffany	Member of the U.S. House of Representatives from Wisconsin's 7th congressional district Taking office 2027	Elect
Honorary titles
Preceded by Maxwell Frost	Baby of the House; Taking office 2027	Designate
