= Fred Clark (politician) =

American politician (born 1959)

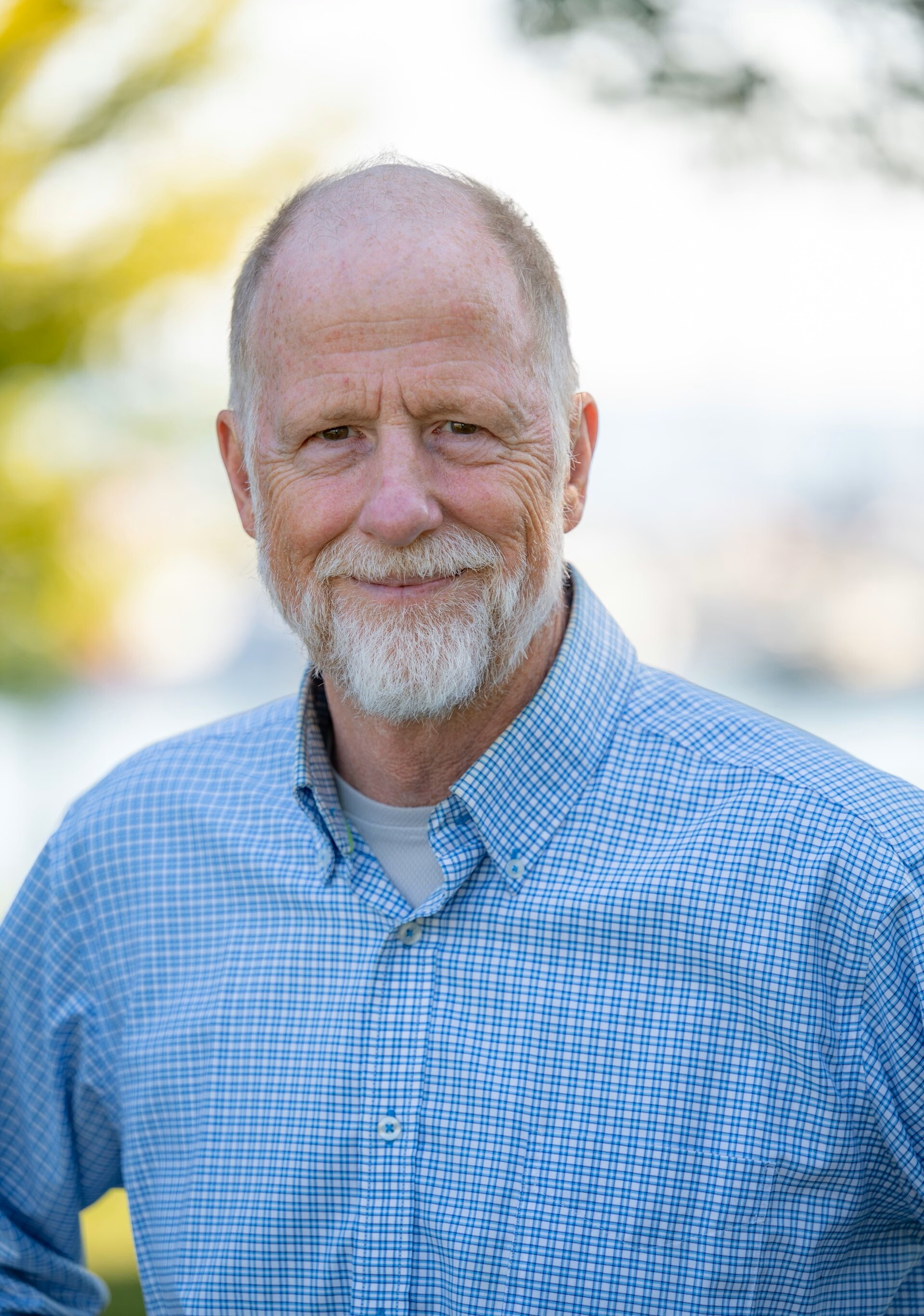
- Clark in 2025

Member of the Wisconsin State Assembly
- In office January 7, 2013 – January 5, 2015
- Preceded by: Kelda Roys
- Succeeded by: Dave Considine
- Constituency: 81st district
- In office January 5, 2009 – January 7, 2013
- Preceded by: Jacob Hines
- Succeeded by: Keith Ripp
- Constituency: 42nd district

Personal details
- Born: May 14, 1959 (age 67) Ann Arbor, Michigan, U.S.
- Party: Democratic
- Children: 1
- Education: Michigan Technological University (attended); Michigan State University (BS); University of Wisconsin, Madison (MS)

Fred Clark (born May 14, 1959) is an American conservationist, businessman, and Democratic politician from Bayfield, Wisconsin. He served three terms in the Wisconsin State Assembly, representing Baraboo and surrounding municipalities in central Wisconsin. He was an unsuccessful candidate for U.S. House of Representatives in Wisconsin's 7th congressional district in the 2026 election.

== Background ==
Born in Ann Arbor, Michigan, Clark graduated from Huron High School in Ann Arbor in 1977. He attended Michigan Technological University before earning a B.S. from Michigan State University in 1985, and an M.S. in Forest Science from the University of Wisconsin–Madison 1992. He served as a Senior Forester with the Wisconsin Department of Natural Resources and an ecologist with The Nature Conservancy.

Clark is a consulting forester. He previously owned and operated Clark Forestry in Baraboo, from 1995 to 2014. Clark Forestry provided forestry management and consulting services to family forest owners, farmers, environmental groups, and government agencies. Clark owned and operated Baraboo Woodworks of Madison, WI., a sawmill, dry kiln, and specialty hardwood and furniture business, from 2014 to 2018. Clark worked as Executive Director of the Forest Stewards Guild, a national nonprofit organization, from 2014 to 2017.

Clark worked from 2018 to 2023 as the first Executive Director of Wisconsin's Green Fire, a statewide nonprofit group promoting science-based management of natural resources. He was the first host of Pulse of the Bay, a weekly interview program on WVCB community radio in Ashland, Wisconsin.

== Public service ==
Clark was appointed by Republican Governor Tommy Thompson to the Lower Wisconsin Riverway Board in 1998, where he served as a representative for Columbia County. In 2004, Clark was appointed by Democratic Governor Jim Doyle to the Wisconsin Council on Forestry, where he leads the council's invasive species committee.

Clark was first elected to the Assembly in 2008, defeating incumbent Republican J.A. "Doc" Hines by a substantial margin (15,936 to 11,304); he was assigned to the standing committees on forestry, (of which he became chair in December 2009), on natural resources, and on rural economic development, and the Wisconsin Council on Tourism. He was reelected in 2010 by a narrow margin (10,208 votes to 9921 for Republican Jack Cummings); he became the Minority Caucus Vice Chairperson for the 2011–2012 session.

In March 2011 Clark moved his desk outside of the capital building to meet with constituents, because of difficulties the public was having entering the building, as a result of an "essential" lock-down of the building to dissuade protests of Governor Walker and his efforts to strip collective bargaining rights away from teachers in Wisconsin.

On April 21, 2011, Clark announced his candidacy for the 14th district seat in the Wisconsin Senate, in the recall election against Luther Olsen, as part of the 2011 Wisconsin protests. In the recall election, Clark was endorsed by the Capital Times, which described him as the "more able, independent and responsible candidate." He lost the race, with Olsen polling fifty-two percent to Clark's forty-eight percent.

In 2011, Clark was ordered to pay $6,500 in back child support payments for not paying enough between January 2009 and February 2011. In June of 2011, Clark was recorded saying that he would like to "smack around" a female constituent.

Clark did not run for a fourth term in 2014 and instead endorsed Dave Considine, who succeeded him.

In 2019 Wisconsin governor Tony Evers appointed Clark to the Department of Natural Resources board. He replaced Preston Cole who was appointed to the board by Evers in December 2018. According to Laurie Ross, the DNR board liaison, Clark was appointed to the position on February 22, 2019. Evers announced the appointment in March.

== Electoral history ==
=== Wisconsin Assembly, 42nd district (2008, 2010) ===
Year	Election	Date	Elected				Defeated				Total	Plurality
2008	General	Nov. 4	Fred Clark	Democratic	15,936	58.47%	J.A. Hines (inc)	Rep.	11,304	41.47%	27,257	4,632
2010	General	Nov. 2	Fred Clark (inc)	Democratic	10,208	50.69%	Jack Cummings	Rep.	9,921	49.27%	20,138	287

=== Wisconsin Senate (2011) ===
Year	Election	Date	Elected				Defeated				Total	Plurality
2011 (recall)	Primary	Jul. 12	Fred Clark	Democratic	15,052	66.70%	Rol Church	Dem.	7,346	32.55%	22,567	7,706
2011 (recall)	Recall	Aug. 9	Luther S. Olsen (inc)	Republican	26,553	52.10%	Fred Clark	Dem.	24,355	47.79%	50,964	2,198

=== Wisconsin Assembly, 81st district (2012) ===
Year	Election	Date	Elected				Defeated				Total	Plurality
2012	General	Nov. 6	Fred Clark	Democratic	17,829	61.83%	Scott Frostman	Rep.	10,995	38.13%	28,835	6,834

=== U.S. House (2026) ===
Year	Election	Date	Elected				Defeated				Total	Plurality
2026	Primary	Aug. 11	Fred Clark	Democratic	25,716	37.66%	Ginger Murray	Dem.	21,726	31.82%	68,282	3,990
2026	Primary	Aug. 11	Fred Clark	Democratic	25,716	37.66%	Chris Armstrong	Dem.	20,764	30.41%	68,282	3,990
