= Mitchell Berman (politician) =

American politician (born 1986)

Member-elect of the U.S. House of Representatives from Wisconsin's 1st district
- Assuming office January 3, 2027
- Succeeding: Bryan Steil

Personal details
- Born: Mitchell Alan Berman; February 7, 1986 (age 40) Peshtigo, Wisconsin, U.S.
- Party: Democratic
- Spouse: Jillian Flood (m. 2015)
- Children: 2
- Education: Marian University (BS)
- Profession: Registered nurse
- Website: Campaign website

Mitchell Alan Berman (born February 7, 1986) is an American politician and registered nurse from Racine County, Wisconsin. A member of the Democratic Party, he is a member-elect of the U.S. House of Representatives, and will represent Wisconsin's 1st congressional district in the 120th Congress (2027–2029). He will be the first Democrat to represent this district since 1994.

In the years before his campaign for Congress, Berman was a leader and organizer in a multi-year community dispute with the school board and village government of Raymond, Wisconsin, that culminated in the resignation of a school superintendent, a recall election, and multiple lawsuits. He served for more than 20 years as a nurse, working for most of that time as an employee at U.S. Department of Veterans Affairs facilities in southeast Wisconsin.

== Early life and career ==
Mitchell Berman was born and raised in rural Peshtigo, Wisconsin. He attended public schools and graduated from Peshtigo High School in 2004. He became the first member of his family to graduate from college, earning his bachelor's degree in nursing from Marian University in 2010. Berman worked three jobs while in college, and was a member of Teamsters Local 344 during that time.

While working on his nursing certification, he worked as a nurse intern at the Fond du Lac County Health Care Center. After graduating from college and becoming certified as a registered nurse, he moved to southeast Wisconsin and was employed at Wheaton Franciscan Healthcare in St. Francis, Wisconsin. After four years, he was hired as a nurse for the U.S. Department of Veterans Affairs, and worked at various veterans facilities in southeast Wisconsin until resigning in 2025. During those years, he resided in Mount Pleasant, Wisconsin, and later in Raymond. As a working nurse, he was a member of the Wisconsin Federation of Nurses and Health Professionals and later became a member of National Nurses United.

== Political career ==
=== Raymond schools dispute ===
Berman first became active in politics in support of his wife, Jillian, in her run for Raymond School Board in 2022. This was at the height of the Moms for Liberty campaign to elect conservative school board members and enact conservative policies in schools. The Bermans' children were just starting elementary school in Raymond, and Jillian was running in opposition to recent book banning in the district.

Jillian's run for school board was largely derailed by a controversy over her residency status. The Bermans had recently relocated into the Raymond school district and were in the process of constructing their home on land they had purchased. Construction of their home had been delayed by materials shortages resulting from COVID-19 pandemic-related supply disruptions, and they were staying temporarily with relatives. At the urging of another candidate, the Raymond village clerk invalidated their voter registration due to non-residency. The Bermans appealed the decision to the bipartisan Wisconsin Elections Commission and were able to keep Jillian's name on the ballot, but were not allowed to vote in the election. She lost the April election, though the Wisconsin Elections Commission ruled after the election that their voter registrations should be reinstated.

Although the election was over, the village government still refused to reinstate their voting rights and launched a new civil lawsuit against the Wisconsin Elections Commission to challenge their ruling on the Bermans' voting eligibilty; at the time, Mitchell Berman suggested that the people of Raymond should be aware of how much money the village government was spending on the effort to deny voting rights to two residents. These events roughly coincided with the start of an effort by conservative members of the Raymond school board toward removing elementary school principal Jeff Peterson.

The Wisconsin Elections Commission responded to the Raymond lawsuit with a strongly-worded filing, faulting the clerk's reading of election law. Nearly 17 months after the election, in August 2023, Wisconsin circuit court judge David Paulson ruled in favor of the village of Raymond and allowed them to continue refusing voter registration to the Bermans.

Shortly after that ruling, Berman filed a complaint alleging that the village government had violated the state's open meetings law with a December 2022 meeting. As part of his efforts to pursue that complaint, he went to the Raymond School office on September 27, 2023, and asked for a copy of the minutes for that December 2022 school board meeting. Unable to produce the minutes, staff contacted the school superintendent, Michael Garvey. Garvey—who had earlier received unrelated death threats at his home address—put the school in soft lockdown "due to possible disruptions ... not based on a threat to our students." Peterson, who was then still the principal, but had already been put on a "professional improvement plan", escorted Berman out of the building, and later noted that Berman had been "polite and civil". That evening, the board voted not to renew Peterson's contract; the following day, Peterson was placed on leave. A short time later, Peterson's personnel file was posted to the Moms for Liberty Facebook page.

Peterson's firing and public mistreatment led to another wave of outrage directed at the Raymond school board. In the following month, Peterson filed a lawsuit alleging discrimination, and Berman made a separate complaint, alleging that the school board had violated election law with their handling of a 2023 school board election recount. In November, the school superintendent resigned, asking the board to be released from any liability.

The protests culminated in a recall campaign against two school board members in the winter of 2023–2024. The recall petitions were certified in January 2024. One of the recalled board members chose to resign, the other survived the February recall election.

With support from the Wisconsin Transparency Project, in the spring of 2024, Berman filed a civil lawsuit alleging the board's December 2022 meeting violated the state open meetings law, and filed a separate lawsuit demanding the Racine County sheriff's department release evidence collected over the original 2023 complaint. The school board finally settled the open meetings lawsuit with Berman in December, acknowledging that the 2022 meeting had been illegal, agreeing to comply with those laws in the future, and paying Berman's legal fees. Racine County separately settled with Berman in the spring of 2025, releasing information and authorizing payment of his legal fees. Berman would say of the saga that it was a "reminder of the indispensible role community members play in holding elected officials accountable."

=== Congress ===
Wisconsin's 1st congressional district 2023–present

In August 2025, Berman announced that he would run for U.S. House of Representatives in 2026, in a longshot bid to oust four-term incumbent Republican Bryan Steil from Wisconsin's 1st congressional district. In his announcement, Berman said he was running to be an advocate for the working class, and was prompted to run by the large cuts to Medicaid and food assistance programs in the One Big Beautiful Bill Act.

Though before he could confront Steil, Berman faced a daunting path to earn the Democratic Party's nomination. Former candidate Randy Bryce—who had become a minor national Democratic celebrity when running against Steil in 2018—had announced that he was running again. Before the end of the year, three other candidates were also pursuing a campaign: Whitewater school board member Miguel Aranda, Janesville nurse Enrique Casiano, and Racine activist Gage Stills. In early 2026, Racine County emergency management coordinator Lorenzo Santos and Milwaukee city councilmember Peter Burgelis also entered the race.

Berman showed early strength in the field, however, posting a relatively impressive $500,000 raised in his May 2026 campaign finance filing. Bryce was ultimately unable to mount a campaign and withdrew at the filing deadline in June; Burgelis withdrew in July and endorsed Berman. In the August 11 primary, Berman prevailed with about 44% of the vote.

Steil entered the general election with a massive cash advantage and strong support from conservative political action committees, and was able to immediately begin advertising. Berman's first campaign ad launched a month after the primary; the ad depicted Berman fishing in a creek—with a pistol on his hip—speaking plainly about his values. His ad received national attention and drove a round of new grassroots donations to his campaign. Berman got more encouraging news that month, when the Democratic Congressional Campaign Committee added him to their "red to blue" program, opening additional national resources to "top tier candidates". Berman was also endorsed by the national Blue Dog Coalition, which supports moderate candidates focused on constituency-based politics.

Over the course of the fall, political observers saw the race moving toward Berman as a national Democratic wave began to materialize in polling. Campaign spending followed those observations, as national Republican and Democratic super PACs redirected funding to advertise in the race. Republican advertising in the race turned negative in October, with ads pointing back to Berman's visit to the Raymond School in September 2023 and accusing him of causing a disturbance that led to the school's soft lockdown, calling him "crazy" and "dangerous".

The candidates met for one debate in mid-October, where Berman relentlessly pushed Steil to answer for deeply unpopular policies of the Trump administration, as Steil sought to avoid defending Trump and pivot to more neutral terrain. The final polls showed a dead heat, with either candidate at 48% or 49%, and prognosticators rated the district a "toss up".

At the November 3 general election, Berman defeated Steil by roughly 12,000 votes out of 305,000 cast. Berman will take office in January 2027; he is the first Democrat to win election in Wisconsin's 1st congressional district since Peter Barca's 1993 special election victory.

== Personal life and family ==
Mitchell Berman is the elder of two sons born to John and Donna Lynn (née Schroeder) Berman. John Berman owned a small roofing business in Peshtigo, Donna worked at the Karl Schmidt Unisia foundry in Marinette. They were also active in community and charitable activities during Berman's childhood.

Mitchell Berman married fellow nurse Jillian Flood in 2015; they have two children together and still reside in Raymond.

== Electoral history ==
=== U.S. House (2026) ===
Wisconsin's 1st Congressional District Election, 2026
Party	Candidate	Votes	%	±%
Democratic Primary, August 11, 2026
Democratic	Mitchell Berman	31,494	44.11%	
Democratic	Peter Burgelis (withdrawn)	15,455	21.64%	
Democratic	Lorenzo Santos	14,590	20.43%	
Democratic	Miguel Aranda	9,701	13.59%	
	Scattering	163	0.23%	
Plurality		16,039	22.46%	
Total votes		71,403	100.0%	
General Election, November 3, 2026 (unofficial results)
Democratic	Mitchell Berman	158,839	51.96%	+8.14pp
Republican	Bryan Steil (incumbent)	146,885	48.04%	−5.96pp
Plurality		11,954	3.91%	−6.28pp
Total votes		305,724	100.0%	−22.31%
Democratic gain from Republican		Swing	14.10pp	

U.S. House of Representatives
Preceded by Bryan Steil	Member of the U.S. House of Representatives from Wisconsin's 1st congressional district Taking office 2027	Elect
