= Lester P. Voigt =

American politician

Lester Voigt (June 5, 1915 – December 28, 2005) was an American conservationist and the first secretary of the Wisconsin Department of Natural Resources.

Voigt's first position in state government was Director of the Wisconsin Department of Conservation. Voigt "was a longtime prominent figure in the national conservation community." He was removed from the position in 1975 after studies found that the agency was being mismanaged.

Voigt also served as the U.S. representative to the International Fishery Commission under five U.S. presidents. He graduated from the University of Wisconsin-Eau Claire with a degree in education. Voigt died at the age of 90.
