= Kirk Bangstad =

Wisconsin brewer and political figure

- Born: Kirk Cushing Bangstad; 1976 or 1977 (age 48–49); Stevens Point, Wisconsin, U.S.
- Education: Harvard University
- Occupations: Brewer; consultant; opera singer; political candidate
- Political party: Democratic
- Spouse: Elizabeth Burrey Smith (m. 2012; died 2018)
- Children: 1
- Website: Campaign website

Kirk Cushing Bangstad (born 1976 or 1977) is an American brewer, consultant, and political figure from Wisconsin. He is the owner of the Minocqua Brewing Company in Minocqua, Wisconsin.

A member of the Democratic party, he was the party's nominee for Wisconsin's 34th Assembly district in the 2020 election and announced his candidacy in the Democratic primary for the 2026 Wisconsin gubernatorial election, but was denied a spot on the ballot by the Wisconsin Elections Commission. He is known for his progressive political activism and his involvement in feuds and legal disputes with state and local government officials and business leaders.

== Biography ==
Bangstad was born in Stevens Point, Wisconsin, in 1976 or 1977. His mother was a voice teacher and his father Gary Philip Bangstad was a choir director and professor of choral studies at the University of Wisconsin–Stevens Point who founded the Wisconsin Master Chorale. A graduate of Stevens Point Area Senior High School, he graduated from Harvard University with a degree in government. He worked as an opera singer and consultant, and had worked for Anthony Weiner and on Jim Doyle's successful gubernatorial campaign for a short time before moving to Minocqua, Wisconsin, in 2015. He and his wife Elizabeth Burrey Smith were owners of a fitness studio in Minocqua before they bought the Minocqua Brewing Company, a bar and restaurant in a historic building in downtown Minocqua in 2016. He announced he would run in the Democratic primary for Wisconsin's 7th congressional district in the 2016 election, but later withdrew his candidacy.

During the COVID-19 pandemic in Wisconsin, Bangstad shut down the business for the summer of 2020 out of concerns for the health of employees and customers. He also mounted a large sign promoting the Joe Biden 2020 presidential campaign outside his business, in defiance of local ordinances. He then ran for Wisconsin's 34th Assembly district against Rob Swearingen in the 2020 election, earning the Democratic nomination, but losing in the general election. He began marketing new beers with politically-themed names, such as ",La" (themed for Kamala Harris), "Bernie Brew" (for Bernie Sanders), and "Biden Beer" (for Joe Biden).

In 2021, Bangstad started the Minocqua Brewing Company Super PAC and committed to donating 5% of brewery profits to the super PAC. The PAC was involved in a number of lawsuits, including attempts to mandate masking in public schools, end voucher schools, and block Republican candidate Donald Trump from the Wisconsin ballot. All three lawsuits were unsuccessful. The super PAC was involved in putting up billboards in support of Janet Protasiewicz and calling for Ron Johnson and Tom Tiffany to resign.

In 2023, Bangstad was sued for criminal defamation by Gregg Walker, the owner, editor, and publisher of the Lakeland Times in Minocqua and the Northwoods River News in Rhinelander, Wisconsin, after Bangstad posted that Walker had committed crimes against his own family members. Bangstad lost, and was ordered to pay $750,000 in damages, a record high amount for Wisconsin defamation cases. The case was later dismissed, but he continued to face civil charges for the post. The same year, permits held by the Minocqua Brewing Company were revoked by the Oneida County Planning and Development Committee. Bangstad sued Oneida County and several town leaders of Minocqua, claiming bias was involved in the Oneida County Planning and Development Committee's decisions that involved his company, including the committee's decision to revoke the company's permit to serve alcohol. Bangstad accused the town of Minocqua and Oneida County of retaliating against the company for his political beliefs and his critique of the local government. Minocqua Brewing Company's permits were later granted following public hearings.

In April 2026, Bangstad accepted a plea deal and pled guilty to disorderly conduct for a June 2025 incident that involved Bangstad and Gregg Walker.

In May 2026, Bangstad was investigated by the Federal Bureau of Investigation and the United States Secret Service after posting an offer for "Free Beer Day" once President Donald Trump died, prompted by a failed assassination attempt on the President. Shortly after, he declared he would enter the Democratic primary for the 2026 Wisconsin gubernatorial election with the hope of being the Democratic party nominee for governor of Wisconsin. He was later denied a spot on the ballot by the Wisconsin Elections Commission for failing to collect sufficient signatures.

In June 2026, Kirk dissolved the Minocqua Brewing Company Super PAC.

In July 2026, all of Minocqua Brewing Company's canned beer was seized by agents of the Wisconsin Department of Revenue, which claimed he had not obtained the proper permits or paid taxes to store and sell beer in Wisconsin that had been brewed in Illinois. At the time, he had suggested that Governor Tony Evers was retaliating against him for his past criticisms of Evers and said his attorney was planning to sue the Evers administration. Minocqua Brewing Company's permits were set to be revoked on August 4, 2026.

On August 5, 2026, it was reported the legal dispute was ongoing and Minocqua Brewing Company's beer would be half price the day Mitch McConnell dies.

== Personal life ==
Bangstad asked Elizabeth Burrey Smith to be his wife a day after she was diagnosed with stage four lung cancer in 2012, after they had been dating for two years. They were married the next week. She died from ALK positive lung cancer on December 17, 2018, at the Howard Young Hospital in Minocqua.

Bangstad has one child from a previous relationship.
