= Preston Cole =

American conservationist (born 1961)

10th Secretary of the Wisconsin Department of Natural Resources
- In office January 7, 2019 – November 23, 2022
- Governor: Tony Evers
- Preceded by: Dan Meyer
- Succeeded by: Adam N. Payne (designee)

Personal details
- Born: 1961 (age 64–65)
- Education: University of Missouri
- Occupation: Forester

Preston D. Cole (born 1961) is a retired American conservationist and was secretary of the Wisconsin Department of Natural Resources during the first term of Governor Tony Evers (2019–2022). Cole previously served as the Chair of the State Natural Resources Board. He was first appointed to the board by Governor Jim Doyle and was reappointed by Governor Scott Walker. Cole currently serves as director for the Department of Administration for the City of Milwaukee.

== Biography ==
Cole previously served as the Commissioner of the City of Milwaukee Department of Neighborhood Services. Prior to that, Cole was the Director of Operations for the City of Milwaukee Department of Public Works. Additionally, he previously served as the Parks Superintendent for the City of St. Louis, as well as a Forester for the Missouri Department of Conservation.

Cole received a Bachelor of Science degree in Forest Management from the University of Missouri and was the first African American to graduate from the degree program. Cole was involved with Future Farmers of America in high school.

Government offices
Preceded by Dan Meyer	Secretary of the Wisconsin Department of Natural Resources; January 7, 2019 – November 23, 2022	Succeeded by Adam N. Payne (designee)
