= Dan Meyer (Wisconsin politician) =

American politician (born 1949)

9th Secretary of the Wisconsin Department of Natural Resources
- In office September 25, 2017 – January 7, 2019
- Governor: Scott Walker
- Preceded by: Cathy Stepp
- Succeeded by: Preston Cole

Member of the Wisconsin State Assembly from the 34th district
- In office January 5, 1999 – January 7, 2013
- Preceded by: Joe Handrick
- Succeeded by: Rob Swearingen

Mayor of Eagle River, Wisconsin
- In office April 1997 – April 2001
- Preceded by: Donald L. Dyer
- Succeeded by: Jeffrey A. Hyslop

Personal details
- Born: January 1, 1949 (age 77) Neenah, Wisconsin, U.S.
- Party: Republican
- Education: University of Wisconsin–Oshkosh
- Profession: Politician

Military service
- Allegiance: United States
- Branch/service: United States Army

Daniel L. Meyer (born January 1, 1949) is a retired American businessman and Republican politician from Wisconsin. He was secretary of the Wisconsin Department of Natural Resources (2017–2018) in the cabinet of governor Scott Walker. He previously served 14 years (1999–2012) in the Wisconsin State Assembly, representing the 34th Assembly district (northern Wisconsin), and was mayor of Eagle River, Wisconsin (1997–2001).

== Biography ==
Born in Neenah, Wisconsin, Meyer graduated from Neenah High School and the University of Wisconsin–Oshkosh; and served in the United States Army during the Vietnam War era. Meyer was the director of the Eagle River, Wisconsin, chamber of commerce and was mayor of Eagle River from 1997 to 2001. He served in the Wisconsin State Assembly from 1999 until his retirement from the legislature in 2013. During his time in the legislature, Meyer was a member of the Natural Resources committee, Veterans and Military Affairs committee and the Joint Committee on Finance.

Wisconsin State Assembly
Preceded by Joe Handrick	Member of the Wisconsin State Assembly from the 34th district January 5, 1999 – January 7, 2013	Succeeded by Rob Swearingen
Government offices
Preceded by Cathy Stepp	Secretary of the Wisconsin Department of Natural Resources; September 25, 2017 – January 7, 2019	Succeeded by Preston Cole
