= Rob Swearingen =

American businessman and politician (born 1963)

Member of the Wisconsin State Assembly from the 34th district
- Incumbent
- Assumed office January 7, 2013
- Preceded by: Dan Meyer

Personal details
- Born: July 23, 1963 (age 63) Oneida County, Wisconsin, U.S.
- Party: Republican
- Profession: Politician

Rob Swearingen (born July 23, 1963) is an American businessman and politician.

Swearingen was born in Oneida County, Wisconsin. He went to Rhinelander High School in Rhinelander, Wisconsin, where Swearingen and his wife now own the AL-GEN dinner club. Rob was president of the Tavern League of Wisconsin from October 2007 to December 2012. In November 2012, he was elected to the Wisconsin State Assembly as a Republican.

== Electoral history ==
| Year | Election | Date | Elected | | | | Defeated | | | | Total | Plurality |
|---|---|---|---|---|---|---|---|---|---|---|---|---|
| 2012 | Primary | Aug. 14 | Rob Swearingen | Republican | 5,161 | 74.22% | Alex Young | Rep. | 1,780 | 25.60% | 6,954 | 3,381 |
| 2012 | Primary | Aug. 14 | Rob Swearingen | Republican | 5,161 | 74.22% | Tracy A. Heron | Rep. | 1,554 | 19.52% | 6,954 | 3,381 |
| 2012 | General | Nov. 6 | Rob Swearingen | Republican | 19,442 | 57.16% | Merlin Van Buren | Dem. | 12,297 | 36.15% | 34,016 | 7,145 |
| 2012 | General | Nov. 6 | Rob Swearingen | Republican | 19,442 | 57.16% | Kevin M. Fitzpatrick | Ind. | 1,469 | 4.32% | 34,016 | 7,145 |
| 2012 | General | Nov. 6 | Rob Swearingen | Republican | 19,442 | 57.16% | Todd Albano | Ind. | 791 | 2.33% | 34,016 | 7,145 |
| 2014 | General | Nov. 4 | Rob Swearingen (inc) | Republican | 22,085 | 98.12% | --Unopposed-- | | | | 22,509 | 21,661 |
| 2016 | General | Nov. 8 | Rob Swearingen (inc) | Republican | 21,686 | 62.99% | Matthew N. Michalsen | Dem. | 12,715 | 36.93% | 34,429 | 8,971 |
| 2018 | General | Nov. 6 | Rob Swearingen (inc) | Republican | 19,699 | 61.92% | Chris Meier | Dem. | 12,096 | 38.02% | 31,816 | 7,603 |
| 2020 | General | Nov. 3 | Rob Swearingen (inc) | Republican | 24,652 | 63.27% | Kirk Bangstad | Dem. | 14,267 | 36.62% | 38,964 | 10,385 |
| 2022 | General | Nov. 8 | Rob Swearingen (inc) | Republican | 20,004 | 61.77% | Eileen Daniel | Dem. | 12,373 | 38.20% | 32,386 | 7,631 |
| 2024 | General | Nov. 5 | Rob Swearingen (inc) | Republican | 25,040 | 64.06% | Dennis Nitzel | Dem. | 14,027 | 35.88% | 39,091 | 11,013 |
