= Wisconsin Department of Natural Resources =

Government agency of Wisconsin, US

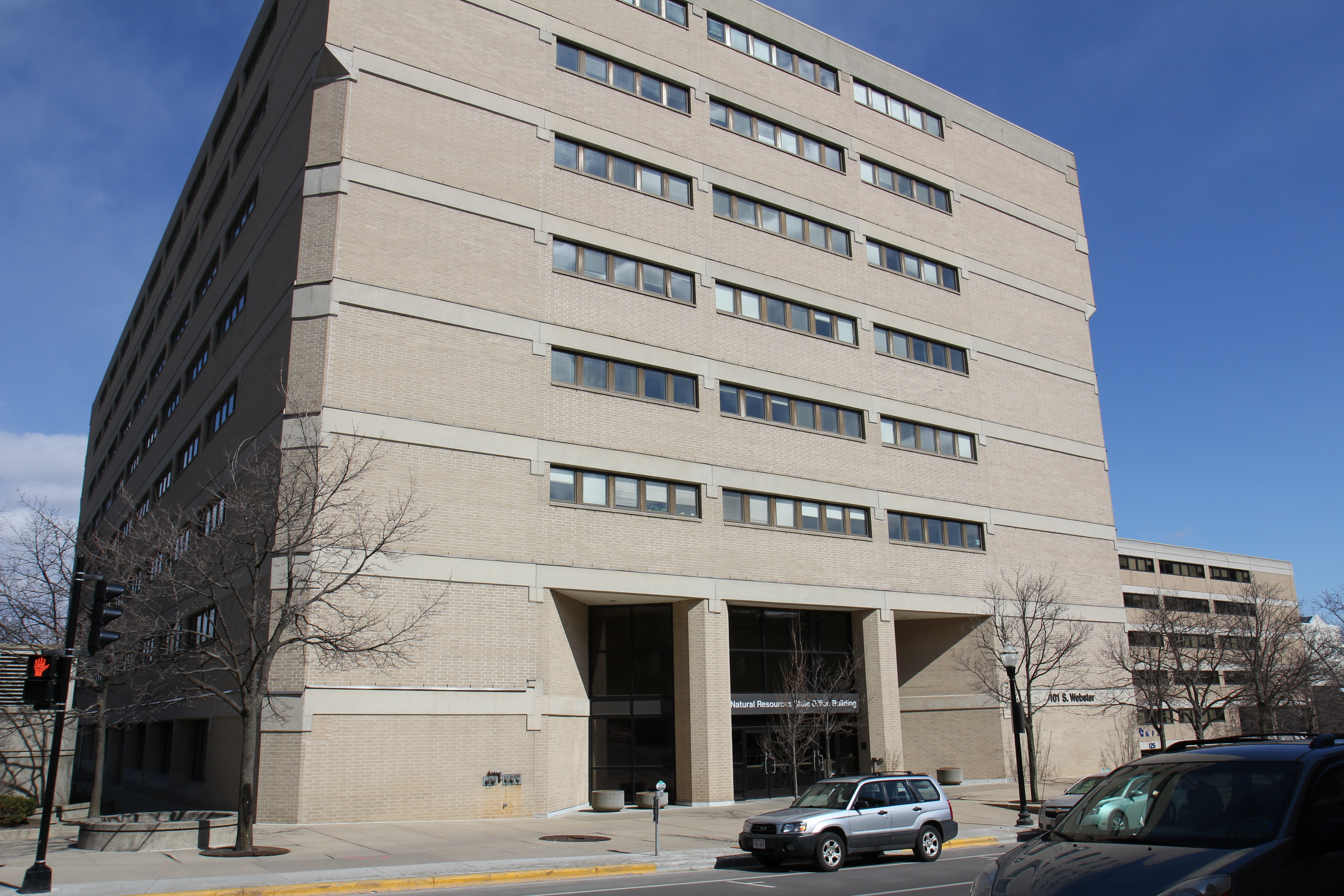
- Headquarters in Madison

Agency overview
- Formed: 1967
- Preceding agencies: Wisconsin Board of Fish Commissioners (1874–1915); Wisconsin Department of Forestry (1903–1915); Wisconsin Conservation Commission (1915–1967); Wisconsin Department of Conservation (1927–1967); Wisconsin Department of Resource Development (1959–1967)
- Jurisdiction: Wisconsin
- Headquarters: 101 S. Webster St. Madison, Wisconsin, U.S.; 43°4′30.612″N 89°22′47.784″W
- Employees: 2,510.93 (2021)
- Annual budget: $1,123,846,500 (2021)
- Agency executive: Karen Hyun, Secretary
- Website: dnr.wi.gov

The Wisconsin Department of Natural Resources (WDNR) is a government agency of the U.S. state of Wisconsin charged with conserving and managing Wisconsin's natural resources. The Wisconsin Natural Resources Board has the authority to set policy for the WDNR. The WDNR is led by the secretary, who is appointed by the governor of Wisconsin. The WDNR develops regulations and guidance in accordance with laws passed by the Wisconsin Legislature. It administers wildlife, fish, forests, endangered resources, air, water, waste, and other issues related to natural resources. The central office of the WDNR is located in downtown Madison, near the state capitol.

== Mission ==
The mission of the WDNR is "To protect and enhance our natural resources: our air, land and water; our wildlife, fish and forests and the ecosystems that sustain all life. To provide a healthy, sustainable environment and a full range of outdoor opportunities. To ensure the right of all people to use and enjoy these resources in their work and leisure. To work with people to understand each other's views and to carry out the public will. And in this partnership consider the future and generations to follow."

== History ==
The WDNR was created through the 1967 merger of two Wisconsin state agencies: The Conservation Department and The Department of Resource Development. This merger was designed to reduce the number of agencies and streamline operations. The governor at the time was Warren P. Knowles.

In 2021, a major illegal sturgeon egg harvesting and selling ring run in part by the former top sturgeon biologist for the Wisconsin Department of Natural Resources was discovered and broken up by investigators.

== Funding and staff ==
The WDNR is funded through the state budget, which is set by the Wisconsin Legislature. The WDNR presents a biennial budget to the Wisconsin Natural Resources Board for their review and approval. This budget reflects potential changes in the number of Full-time equivalent employees (FTE), as well as the overall operating budget the WDNR anticipates needing. The 2017–2019 budget decreased the WDNR budget of $1.1 billion over this two-year period about 2.5% in relation to the 2016–2017 base year. The 2017–2019 biennial budget also included a decrease of 49.5 FTE, bringing department staffing to 2,499.6 FTE employees. Staffing for the WDNR decreased by 15% between 2000–2001 and 2017–2019, under both Democratic and Republican administrations.

As of 2025, the WDNR is led by the secretary, Karen Hyun, who was appointed to the post by Governor Tony Evers.

== Organization ==
=== Wisconsin Natural Resources Board ===
The Wisconsin Natural Resources Board is the governing body of the WDNR. This board is filled by the governor, who appoints seven individual members to serve without compensation. The appointments made by the governor are confirmed by the state senate, and each board member serves a six-year staggered term. The role of the board members is to supervise the actions of the WDNR, make policy, and review the biennial budget.

=== Leadership ===
The senior leadership of the Department consists of the secretary, deputy secretary, and assistant deputy secretary, along with the administrators heading up the divisions of the Department. Regional directors represent the department leadership around the state.

- Secretary: Karen Hyun
- Deputy Secretary: Steven Little
- Assistant Deputy Secretary: Mark Aquino
  - South regional director: Shelly Allness (Fitchburg)
  - Southeast regional director: Mike Thompson (Milwaukee)
  - West regional director: Jill Schoenn (Eau Claire)
  - North regional director: James Yach (Rhinelander)
  - Northeast regional director: Connie Antonuk (Green Bay)
- Environmental Management: Darsi Foss
- External Services: Dave Siebert
- Fish, Wildlife, and Parks: Keith Warnke
- Forestry: Heather Berklund
- Internal Services: Tim Cooke
- Law Enforcement: Casey Krueger

=== Divisions ===
==== Environmental Management Division ====
"The Environmental Management (EM) Division protects human health and the environment by working in partnership with the communities, citizens, businesses and advocacy groups." This division uses information about the environment such as the air and water to create a more conservation based protection over the different resources. The division is continually working to improve the information obtained through feedback and self-evaluation of different projects or policies implemented. The division administers and enforces several federal environmental laws including the Clean Air Act, Clean Water Act, Resource Conservation and Recovery Act, and Safe Drinking Water Act.

- This division consists of six programs:
  - Air Management
  - Drinking Water & Groundwater
  - Office of Great Waters
  - Remediation & Redevelopment
  - Waste & Materials Management
  - Water Quality

==== External Services Division ====
The External Services Division was created though the Department of Natural Resources 2016 and 2017 alignment initiative. This division consists of: Watershed Management, Environmental Analysis & Sustainability, Customer & Outreach Services, and Community Financial Assistance. "The purpose of this diverse program is to serve as a primary point of contact for businesses, local government and the public." Through this division, an integration of the local government and public are reached. In collaboration with other divisions and other agencies, the WDNR is able to apply more parameters when it comes to making a decision about a project or other initiatives.

The Green Tier Program, a voluntary program set up by the Wisconsin Department of Natural Resources, provides state businesses with the opportunity to bring economics and the environment together. As of March 2018, 73 corporations and companies are Green Tier participants, including 3M, ABB Inc., Frito-Lay, and Roundy's Supermarkets, Inc. Green Tier includes multiple new charters which includes Legacy Communities – a Smart Growth partnership with an aim to assist communities to develop sustainability strategies at the local level.

==== Fish, Wildlife, & Parks Division ====
"The Fish, Wildlife, and Parks Division plans and directs activities to protect, manage, conserve, and wisely use Wisconsin's lands, plants, wildlife, fisheries and recreation resources". Though monitoring and establishing objectives about the wildlife populations, the division is able to gain a better understanding of the population numbers in an area to help make management decisions about a species. Along with a better understanding of wildlife populations, this division is able to preserve and protect future generations of species. These objectives and monitoring will also allow more statewide recreational and conservation activities.

- Programs within this division are:
  - Parks and Recreation Management
  - Wildlife Management
  - Natural Heritage Conservation
  - Fisheries Management
  - Office of Applied Science
  - Office of Business Services.

Directory of State Parks, Forests, & Natural Areas

- Wisconsin is home to:
  - 50 State Parks
  - 9 State Forests
  - 9 State Recreation Areas
  - 44 State Trails
  - 687 Natural Areas

==== Forestry Division ====
"The Forestry Division protects and sustains forested lands throughout the state, combining technical and financial assistance, planning, research, education and policy to sustain the forest for today and in the future." It covers 17.1 million acres of forest. The forest provides ecological services such as timber products, nutrient cycling, habitat for wildlife, and clean air. Outdoor activities such as hunting and fishing can be benefited through the maintenance and preservation of the state's forests.

- This division consists of eight programs:
  - Forest Health
  - Forest Products Services
  - Forest Protection
  - Prescribed Fire
  - Privately Owned Forest Lands
  - Public Lands
  - Reforestation
  - Urban Forests

==== Internal Services Division ====
"The Internal Services Division serves internal and external customers of the department, which is responsible for Facility and Property Services, Human Resources, Fleet Management, Budget and Finance and Information Technology."

==== Division of Public Safety and Resource Protection ====
The Wisconsin Conservation Warden Service is tasked with handling all law enforcement duties for the WDNR, to include the enforcement of fish and wildlife protection laws, environmental protection laws, recreational vehicle laws, and providing police services on all WDNR-owned land. Seven Wisconsin Conservation Wardens have died in the line of duty since 1928.

=== Statutory councils ===
- Dry Cleaner Environmental Response Council
- Council on Forestry
- Metallic Mining Council
- Natural Areas Preservation Council
- Nonmotorized Recreation and Transportation Trails Council
- Off-Highway Motorcycle Council
- Off-Road Vehicle Council
- Small Business Environmental Council
- Snowmobile Recreational Council
- Sporting Heritage Council
- State Trails Council
- Wetland Study Council

=== Statutorily-required advisory entities ===
- Fire Department Advisory Council
- Urban Forestry Council

=== Attached independent entities ===
- Groundwater Coordinating Council
- Invasive Species Council
- Lake Michigan Commercial Fishing Board
- Lake Superior Commercial Fishing Board
- Lower Wisconsin State Riverway Board
- Council on Recycling
- Wisconsin Waterways Commission

=== Affiliated entities ===
- The Wisconsin Conservation Congress (WCC) advises the WDNR and Natural Resources Board on managing the state's natural resources. The WCC is composed of citizen-elected delegates including five members of an executive committee, 22 members of a district leadership council, 360 county delegates (five per county), and the general public. The WCC was created in 1934. The WCC provides citizens an opportunity to give input and discuss conservation issues.

== Volunteer opportunities ==
The WDNR provides volunteer opportunities for those interested in natural resources, including Adopt a Fish and Wildlife Area, Wisconsin State Park System, State Natural Areas Volunteer Program, Monitoring, and Safety & Education. Through the Bureau of Natural Heritage Conservation, citizens can help care for Wisconsin's public lands and native landscapes. Citizens can also help scientists monitor Wisconsin's plants, animals, water, weather, and soils, or become a volunteer instructor to help and influence other resource users.

=== Snapshot Wisconsin ===
Wisconsin DNR coordinates Snapshot Wisconsin, a citizen science project to identify animals photographed by camera traps. Over 2,000 camera traps are hosted by volunteers across the state. Snapshot Wisconsin was launched in partnership with NASA and UW-Madison; the data collected has been used in multiple scientific articles. The project is hosted on Zooniverse, a citizen science website. The project has captured over 50 million photos since its start in 2014.

== Initiatives ==
=== Wisconsin Department of Veterans Affairs Recreation ===
Veterans are eligible for special benefits from the WDNR to honor their service. These may include reduced fees, resident fees for active duty service members, and eligibility for certain hunts.

== Department secretaries ==
=== Secretaries (1967–present) ===
Secretary	Took office	Left office	Notes
Lester P. Voigt	August 3, 1967	May 23, 1975	Acting secretary until Aug. 1967. Removed by the board.
Tony Earl	December 15, 1975	November 1, 1980	Nominated by Patrick Lucey. Resigned.
Carroll D. Besadny	November 1, 1980	January 8, 1993	Selected by Natural Resources Board. Resigned.
George Meyer	January 15, 1993	February 6, 2001	Selected by Natural Resources Board. Replaced by governor.
Darrell Bazzell	February 6, 2001	January 6, 2003	Appointed by Scott McCallum.
P. Scott Hassett	January 6, 2003	September 1, 2007	Appointed by Jim Doyle.
Matthew J. Frank	September 1, 2007	January 3, 2011	Appointed by Jim Doyle.
Cathy Stepp	January 3, 2011	August 31, 2017	Appointed by Scott Walker.
Dan Meyer	September 25, 2017	January 7, 2019	Appointed by Scott Walker.
Preston Cole	January 7, 2019	November 23, 2022	Appointed by Tony Evers.
Adam N. Payne	December 27, 2022	November 1, 2023	Appointed by Tony Evers.
Karen Hyun	January 27, 2025		Appointed by Tony Evers.

== See also ==
- C.D. "Buzz" Besadny Anadromous Fish Facility
- List of law enforcement agencies in Wisconsin
- List of state and territorial fish and wildlife management agencies in the United States
