= Wisconsin's 34th Assembly district =

American legislative district in northern Wisconsin

Wisconsin's 34th State Assembly district
- 2024 map defined in 2023 Wisc. Act 94; 2022 map defined in Johnson v. Wisconsin Elections Commission; 2011 map was defined in 2011 Wisc. Act 43
Assemblymember
Rob Swearingen; R–Rhinelander
since January 7, 2013 (13 years)
- Demographics: 91.96% White; 0.62% Black; 1.25% Hispanic; 0.68% Asian; 4.86% Native American; 0.07% Hawaiian/Pacific Islander
- Population (2020) • Voting age: 59,520; 49,742
- Website: Official website
- Notes: Northern Wisconsin

The 34th Assembly district of Wisconsin is one of 99 districts in the Wisconsin State Assembly. Located in northern Wisconsin, the district comprises all of Vilas County and most of Oneida County. It contains the cities of Rhinelander and Eagle River and most of the Lac du Flambeau Reservation. It also contains parts of the Nicolet National Forest, including the Blackjack Springs Wilderness. The district is represented by Republican Rob Swearingen, since January 2013.

The 34th Assembly district is located within Wisconsin's 12th Senate district, along with the 35th and 36th Assembly districts.

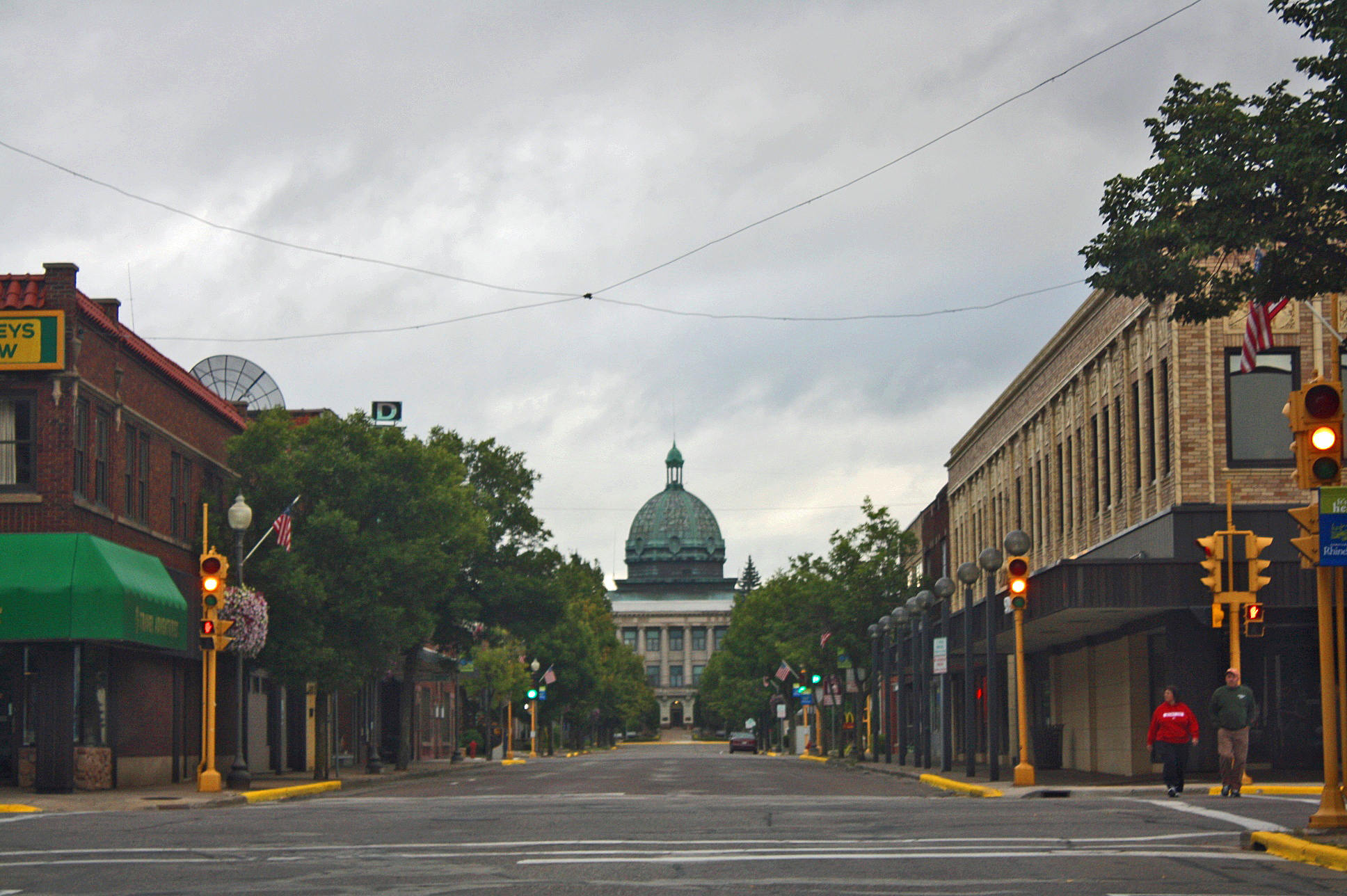
Downtown Rhinelander

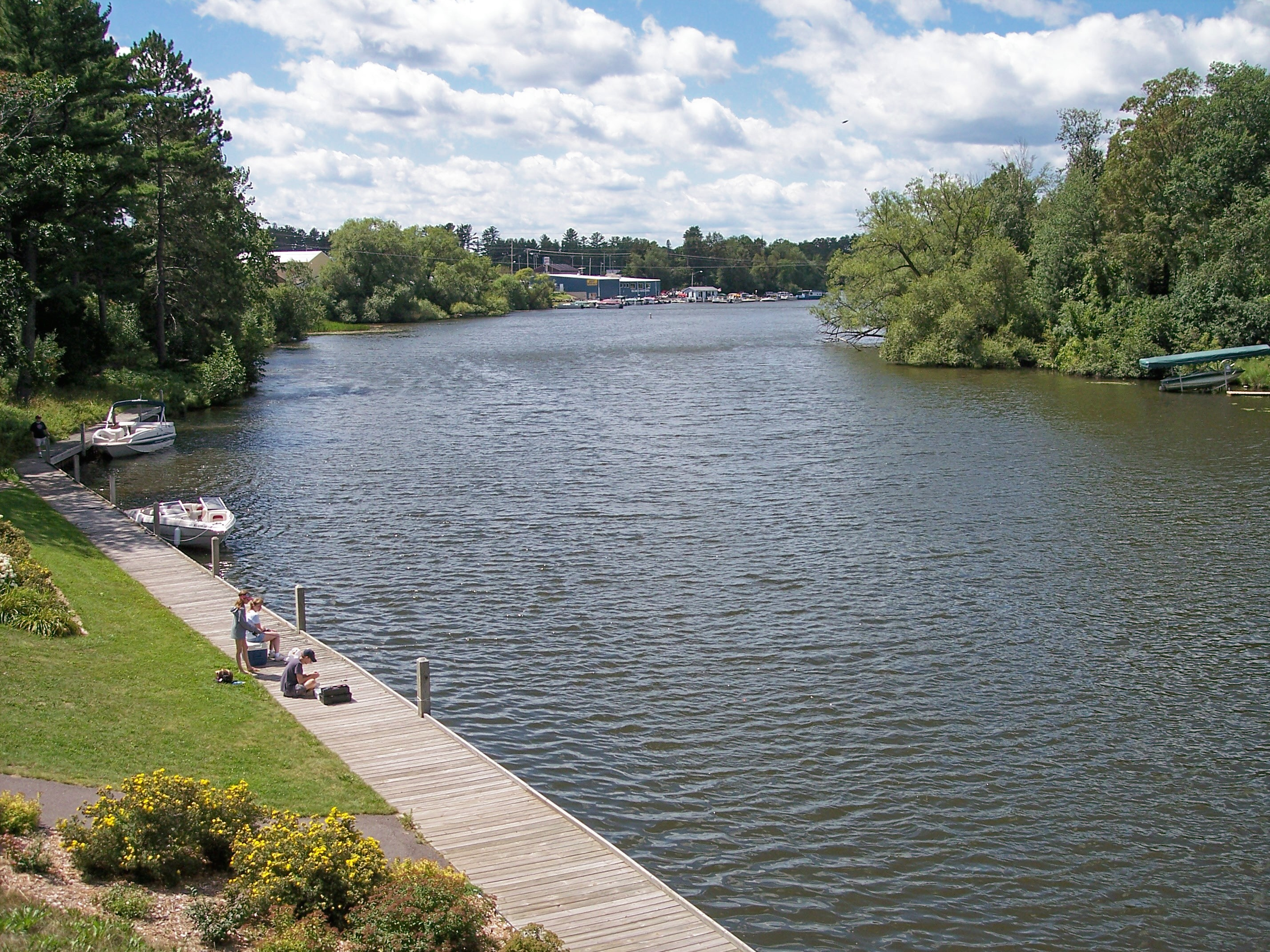
The Eagle River flowing through Eagle River

== History ==
The district was created in the 1972 redistricting act (1971 Wisc. Act 304) which first established the numbered district system, replacing the previous system which allocated districts to specific counties. The 34th district was drawn with novel boundaries, taking the southern half of the former Price County–Rusk County–Sawyer County district (all of Rusk County and southern Price County) and the western half of the former Lincoln County–Taylor County district (Taylor County) along with part of northern Clark County. The last representative of the Lincoln–Taylor district, Joseph Sweda, was elected in the 1972 election as the first representative of the 34th Assembly district.

Following the 1982 court-ordered redistricting, which scrambled all State Assembly districts, the 1983 redistricting moved the 34th district to Oneida County and Vilas County. The district's boundaries did not change through redistricting in 1992, but the 2002 plan removed part of southwest Oneida County from the district. The controversial 2011 redistricting plan (2011 Wisc. Act 43) was the most significant change to the district since 1983, stretching the boundaries east through rural northern Forest County and Florence County. The 2022 redistricting restored a configuration closer to the previous map, by removing the Forest and Florence portions.

== List of past representatives ==
List of representatives to the Wisconsin State Assembly from the 34th district
Member	Party	Residence	Counties represented	Term start	Term end	Ref.
District created
Joseph Sweda	Dem.	Lublin	Clark, Price, Rusk, Taylor	January 1, 1973	January 6, 1975	
Stanley J. Lato	Dem.	Gilman	Clark, Price, Rusk, Taylor	January 6, 1975	January 1, 1979	
Robert J. Larson	Rep.	Medford	Clark, Price, Rusk, Taylor	January 1, 1979	January 3, 1983	
John Medinger	Dem.	La Crosse	La Crosse	January 3, 1983	January 7, 1985	
Jim Holperin	Dem.	Eagle River	Oneida, Vilas	January 7, 1985	January 2, 1995	
Joe Handrick	Rep.	Minocqua	Oneida, Vilas	January 2, 1995	January 1, 2001	
Dan Meyer	Rep.	Eagle River	Oneida, Vilas	January 1, 2001	January 7, 2013	
Rob Swearingen	Rep.	Rhinelander	Florence, Forest, Oneida, Vilas	January 7, 2013	Current	
Rob Swearingen	Rep.	Rhinelander	Oneida, Vilas	January 7, 2013	Current	
