= 2025 Detroit mayoral election =

City election in Detroit, US

- November 4, 2025
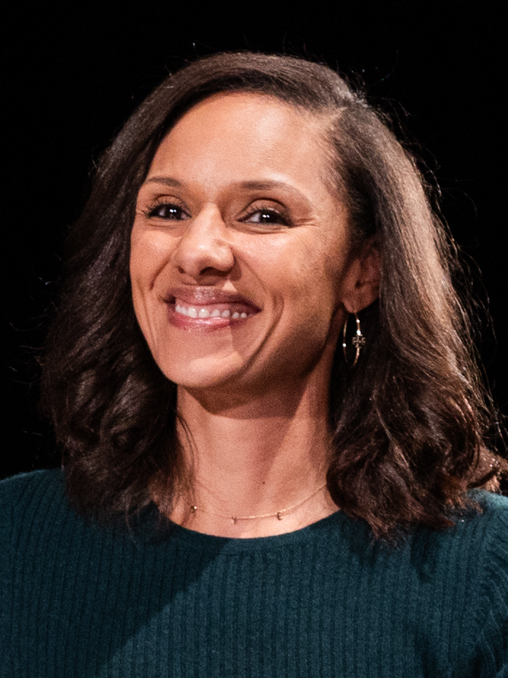

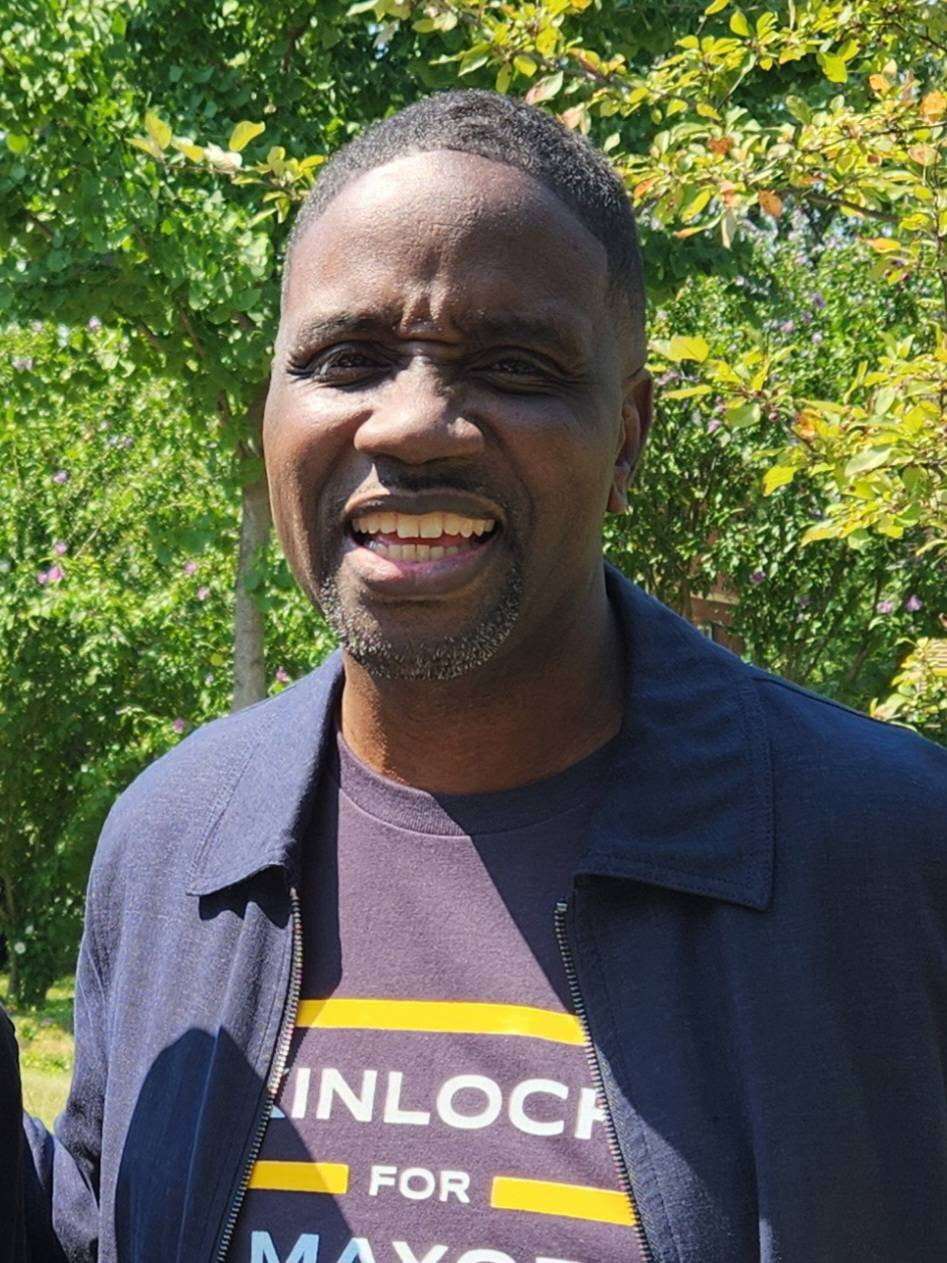
Candidate	Mary Sheffield	Solomon Kinloch Jr.
Popular vote	88,229	25,725
Percentage	77.02%	22.46%
Mayor before election
Mike Duggan
Independent
Elected mayor
Mary Sheffield
Democratic

The 2025 Detroit mayoral election was held on November 4, 2025, to elect the next mayor of Detroit, Michigan. It was preceded by a primary election held on August 5, in which the two highest-placing candidates advanced to the general election. Municipal elections in Michigan are officially nonpartisan.

Incumbent Mayor Mike Duggan was eligible to run for re-election to a fourth term, but declined, instead running in the 2026 Michigan gubernatorial election. Mary Sheffield, the Democratic Party-affiliated president of the Detroit City Council going into the mayoral election, defeated the Reverend Solomon Kinloch Jr., the senior pastor of a Detroit-based Charismatic Christian megachurch, in the November 4 general election.

== Candidates ==
=== Filed ===
The deadline for candidates to file their paperwork to appear on the ballot was April 22, 2025. The following candidates filed by that deadline:

- Jonathan Barlow, businessman (party affiliation: Democratic)
- James Craig, former chief of the Detroit Police Department (2013–2021) and candidate for governor of Michigan in 2022 and U.S. Senate in 2024 (party affiliation: Republican)
- Fred Durhal III, Detroit City Council member from the 7th district (2021–present) (party affiliation: Democratic)
- Joel Haashiim, businessman (party affiliation: Democratic)
- Saunteel Jenkins, former president of the Detroit City Council (2013–2014) from the at-large district (2010–2014) (party affiliation: Democratic)
- Solomon Kinloch Jr., senior pastor of Triumph Church (party affiliation: Democratic)
- Todd Perkins, attorney (party affiliation: Democratic)
- Mary Sheffield, president of the Detroit City Council (2022–present) from the 5th district (2014–present) (party affiliation: Democratic)
- DaNetta Simpson, retired cosmetologist, niece of Nation of Islam founder Elijah Muhammad, and perennial candidate

=== Write-in candidates ===
- Arnold Boyd, businessman
- Rogelio Landin, Michigan state director for the League of United Latin American Citizens

=== Declined ===
- Mike Duggan, incumbent mayor (2014–present): ran for governor as an independent candidate
- Garlin Gilchrist, Democratic incumbent lieutenant governor of Michigan (2019–present): ran for governor
- Portia Robertson, CEO of Focus: HOPE, member of the Michigan Civil Rights Commission, and candidate for Michigan's 13th congressional district in 2022 (party affiliation: Democratic)
- Joe Tate, Democratic state representative from the 10th district (2019–present) and former speaker of the Michigan House of Representatives: running for U.S. Senate (withdrew)
- Mary D. Waters, at-large Detroit City Council member (2022–present) and candidate for Michigan's 13th congressional district in 2024 (party affiliation: Democratic): successfully ran for reelection the Detroit City Council

== Primary election ==
=== Polling ===
Poll source	Date(s) administered	Sample size (Note: Key: A – all adults RV – registered voters LV – likely voters V – unclear)	Margin of error	James Craig	Fred Durhal	Saunteel Jenkins	Solomon Kinloch	Todd Perkins	Mary Sheffield	Other	Undecided
Glengariff Group (Note: Poll sponsored by The Detroit News and WDIV-TV)	May 27–29, 2025	500 (LV)	± 4.4%	9%	2%	8%	14%	4%	38%	3% (Note: Jonathan Barlow, Joel Haashiim & DaNetta Simpson each with 1%)	22%
Target Insyght	May 4–7, 2025	400 (RV)	± 5.0%	19%	2%	7%	25%	5%	32%	1% (Note: John Barlow with 1%)	10%
Douglas Fulmer & Associates	February 16–20, 2025	400 (RV)	± 5%	20%	2%	12%	5%	4%	34%	2% (Note: Joe Tate with 2%; Joel Haashim with 0%)	21%

=== Endorsements ===
Fred Durhal III

Federal officials

- Sandy Baruah, CEO of the Detroit Regional Chamber and former administrator of the Small Business Administration (2008–2009)

Local officials

- Kevin Coleman, mayor of Westland (2023–present) and former state representative from the 25th district (2019–2023)
- Tim Greimel, mayor of Pontiac (2022–present) and former minority leader of the Michigan House of Representatives (2013–2017) from the 29th district (2012–2019)
- David LaGrand, mayor of Grand Rapids (2025–present) and former state representative from the 75th district (2016–2023)
- Andy Schor, mayor of Lansing (2018–present) and former state representative from the 68th district (2013–2018)

Organizations

- Detroit Regional Chamber PAC
Saunteel Jenkins

Local officials

- Dave Bing, former mayor of Detroit (2009–2014)
- QuanTez Pressley, at-large appointed Detroit police commissioner (2022–present)

Party officials

- Jerron Totten, chair of the Michigan Democratic Party LGBT and Allies Caucus (2025–present)

Individuals

- Christine Beatty, former chief of staff of the mayor of Detroit's office (2002–2008)
- Carla Walker-Miller, businesswoman and Henry Ford Museum trustee (2020–present)

Newspaper editorial boards

- The Detroit News editorial board
- Michigan Chronicle editorial board (co-endorsement with Sheffield)
Solomon Kinloch

U.S. representatives

- Brenda Lawrence, former U.S. representative from Michigan's 14th congressional district (2015–2023)

County officials

- Jonathan Kinloch, Wayne county commissioner from the 2nd district (2021–present) and 4th vice chair of the Michigan Democratic Party (2019–present) (candidate's brother)
- Kym Worthy, Wayne County Prosecutor (2004–present)

Local officials

- Anthony Adams, former deputy mayor of Detroit (2002–2008) and runner-up for mayor in 2021
- Ralph Godbee, former police chief of the Detroit Police Department (1987–2012)
- Reneé Hall, former chief of the Dallas Police Department (2017–2020) and former chief deputy of the Detroit Police Department (2014–2017)
- Kandia Milton, former deputy mayor (2008) and acting mayor of Detroit (2008)

Individuals

- Shawn Fain, president of United Auto Workers (2023–present)

Party chapters

- 12th Congressional District Democratic Party
- 13th Congressional District Democratic Party (Note: This chapter is led by Jonathan Kinloch, who is the candidate's brother. According to the article, Jonathan recused himself from screening and recommending in the endorsement process.)

Labor unions

- American Federation of State, County and Municipal Employees Michigan Chapter 925 and Retirees Chapter 255
- United Auto Workers Region 1 and Region 1A
Todd Perkins

Municipal officials

- Richard Hathaway, former Wayne County treasurer (2015–2016) and former 3rd circuit court judge (1985–2004) (campaign committee leader)
Mary Sheffield

Statewide officials

- Keith Ellison, attorney general of Minnesota (2019–present) and former U.S. representative from MN-05 (2007–2019)

State legislators

- Mari Manoogian, former state representative from the 40th district (2019–2022)

Local officials

- Nicholas Hood III, former city councilor from the 3rd district (1994–2002) and 2001 mayoral candidate
- Greg Mathis, former 36th judicial district court judge (1995–1998) and television court show arbitrator on Judge Mathis

Party officials

- Keith Williams, chair of the Michigan Democratic Party Black Caucus (2018–present) and former Wayne county commissioner from the 6th district (2003–2010)

Individuals

- Melissa Butler, beauty entrepreneur
- Benjamin Crump, civil rights attorney
- Nick Rathod, founder of State Innovation Exchange (campaign advisor)
- Marvin Winans, gospel singer and pastor

Organizations

- EMILY's List

Labor unions

- International Association of Fire Fighters Local 344
- International Brotherhood of Electrical Workers Local 58
- International Brotherhood of Teamsters Joint Council #43
- Laborers' International Union of North America Local 1191
- Michigan Building and Construction Trades Council
- Michigan Regional Council of Carpenters
- Service Employees International Union Michigan and SEIU Healthcare Michigan
- UNITE HERE Locals 24 and 1191

Newspaper editorial boards

- Detroit Free Press editorial board
- Michigan Chronicle editorial board (co-endorsement with Jenkins)
Declined to endorse in primary

Local officials

- Mike Duggan, outgoing mayor of Detroit (2014–present) (Independent)
- Latisha Johnson, city councilor from the 4th district (2022–present) (Democratic)
- Gabriela Santiago-Romero, city councilor from the 6th district (2022–present) (Democratic)
- Mary Waters, at-large city councilor (2022–present) and former state representative from the 4th district (2001–2007) (Democratic)

Political parties

- Michigan Democratic Party Black Caucus

=== Debates ===
2025 Detroit mayoral primary election debates
No.	Date	Host	Moderator	Link	Participants					
Key: P Participant A Absent N Non-invitee I Invitee W Withdrawn										
Key: P Participant A Absent N Non-invitee I Invitee W Withdrawn					Craig	Durhal	Jenkins	Kinloch	Perkins	Sheffield
1	May 29, 2025	Detroit Regional Chamber	Stephen Henderson; Nolan Finley		P	P	P	P	N	P
2	June 16, 2025	WDIV-TV; AARP Michigan	Jason Colthorp		P	N	P	P	N	P
3	June 21, 2025	Daily Detroit; Eastside Community Network; Outlier Media	Orlando Bailey; Donna Givens Davidson; Jer Staes		A	P	P	A	P	P

=== Results ===
Nonpartisan primary results
Candidate	Votes	%
Mary Sheffield	43,597	50.7
Solomon Kinloch	14,900	17.3
Saunteel Jenkins	13,738	16.0
Todd Perkins	4,603	5.4
James Craig	4,458	5.2
Fred Durhal III	2,902	3.4
Jonathan Barlow	707	0.8
DaNetta Simpson	538	0.6
Joel Hashiim	349	0.4
Write-in	228	0.3
Total votes	86,020	100.00

== General election ==
=== Candidates ===
- Solomon Kinloch Jr., senior pastor of Triumph Church
- Mary Sheffield, president of the Detroit City Council (2022–2026) from the 5th district (2014–2026)

=== Polling ===
Poll source	Date(s) administered	Sample size	Margin of error	Solomon Kinloch	Mary Sheffield	Other	Undecided
Glengariff Group (Note: Poll sponsored by The Detroit News and WDIV-TV)	October 16–18, 2025	500 (LV)	± 4.4%	14%	65%	1%	20%

=== Post-primary endorsements ===
Mary Sheffield

2025 mayoral candidates

- Fred Durhal III, city councilor from the 7th district (2021–present)
- Saunteel Jenkins, former president of the Detroit City Council (2013–2014) from the at-large district (2010–2014)

Federal officials

- Sandy Baruah, former administrator of the Small Business Administration (2008–2009)

Local officials

- Mike Duggan, former mayor of Detroit (2014–2026)
- Svante Myrick, former mayor of Ithaca, New York (2012–2022)
- Gabriela Santiago-Romero, city councilor from the 6th district (2022–present)

Individuals

- Juanita Bynum, gospel singer and pastor
- Horace Sheffield III, pastor and talk show host (candidate's father)

Organizations

- Detroit Regional Chamber PAC
- People for the American Way

Newspaper editorial boards

- Detroit Free Press
- The Detroit News

=== Debate ===
2025 Detroit mayoral general election debate
No.	Date	Host	Moderator	Link	Participants	
Key: P Participant A Absent N Non-invitee I Invitee W Withdrawn						
Key: P Participant A Absent N Non-invitee I Invitee W Withdrawn					Kinloch	Sheffield
1	October 15, 2025	WXYZ-TV	Carolyn Clifford; Chuck Stokes		P	P

=== Results ===
General election results
Candidate	Votes	%
Mary Sheffield	88,229	77.02%
Solomon Kinloch Jr.	25,725	22.46%
Write-in	601	0.52%
Total votes	114,555	100.00%

== Notes ==
Partisan clients
