= Brenda Jones (politician) =

American politician (born 1959)

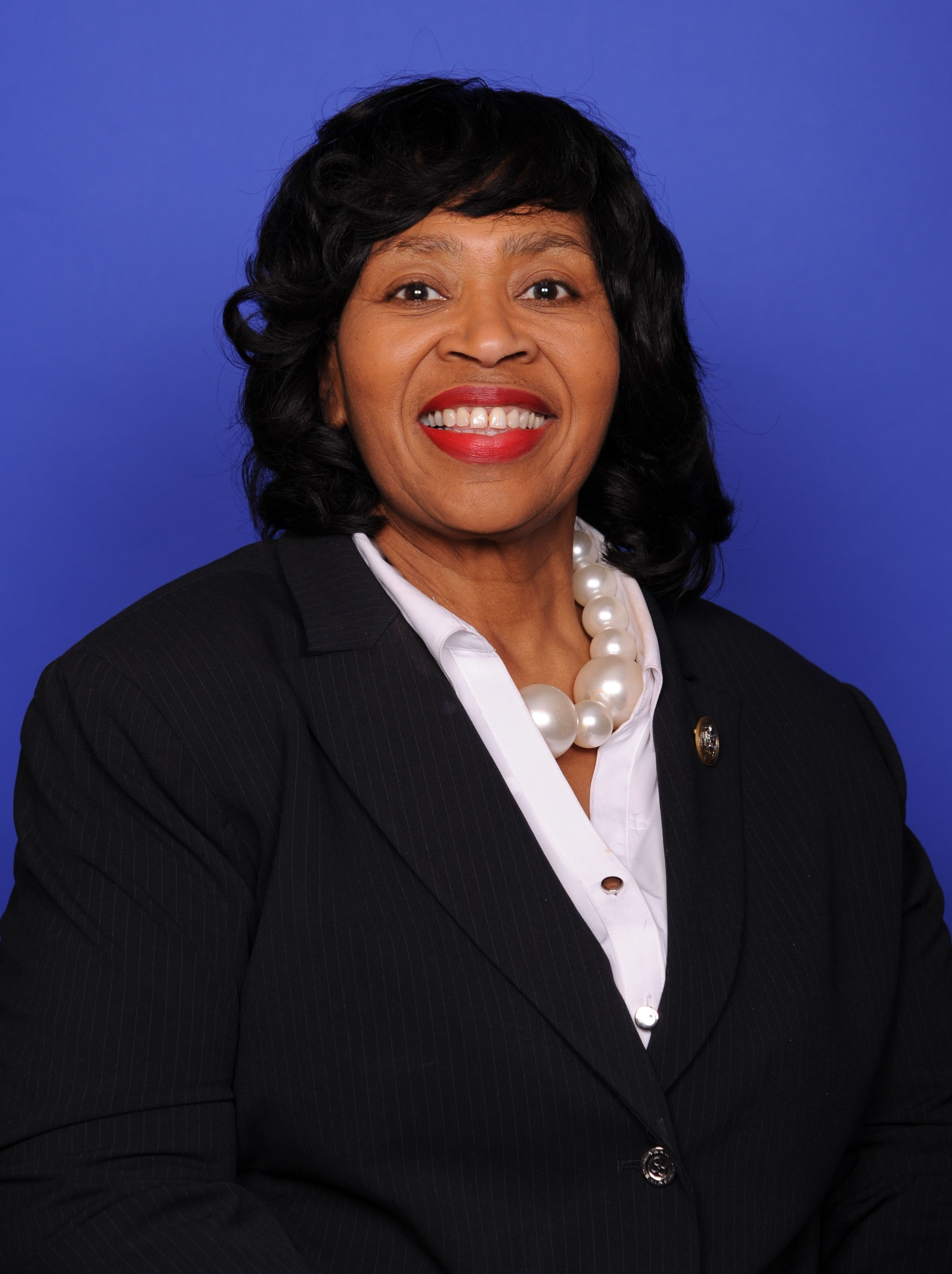
- Official portrait, 2018

Member of the U.S. House of Representatives from Michigan's 13th district
- In office November 29, 2018 – January 3, 2019
- Preceded by: John Conyers
- Succeeded by: Rashida Tlaib

President of the Detroit City Council
- In office January 1, 2014 – January 1, 2022
- Preceded by: Saunteel Jenkins
- Succeeded by: Mary Sheffield

Member of the Detroit City Council from the at-large district
- In office January 1, 2014 – January 1, 2022
- Preceded by: Kenneth Cockrel Jr.

Member of the Detroit City Council
- In office January 3, 2006 – January 1, 2014

Personal details
- Born: October 24, 1959 (age 66) Birmingham, Alabama, U.S.
- Party: Democratic
- Education: Wayne State University (BA, GrCert)

Brenda B. Jones (born October 24, 1959) is an American politician who served as a member of the Detroit City Council from 2006 to 2022, and as the president of the City Council from 2014 to 2022. A member of the Democratic Party, Jones also briefly served as the U.S. representative for Michigan's 13th congressional district from November 29, 2018, to January 3, 2019. She won the 2018 special election to succeed John Conyers following his resignation in December 2017, and was succeeded by Rashida Tlaib. She ran for the seat again in 2020, losing the Democratic primary to Tlaib.

== Early life ==
Brenda B. Jones was born on October 24, 1959, in Birmingham, Alabama, and her family moved to Detroit, Michigan, during the Great Migration. She attended public schools in Detroit, where she graduated from Cass Technical High School and later received a Bachelor of Arts in psychology from Wayne State University. She also earned a Graduate certificate from Wayne State University. Jones worked for Michigan Bell and was later elected as a union president of the Communications Workers of America Local 4004 in Detroit. She was appointed as an executive on the boards of the Detroit Economic Growth Corporation and the Detroit Transportation Commission.

== Politics ==
=== Detroit City Council ===
In 2005, Jones was elected to the Detroit City Council after placing ninth in the general election where nine seats were available and was reelected in 2009, 2013, and 2017. In 2015, the council voted for her to serve as the President of the Detroit City Council with five voting in favor of her and four voting in favor of incumbent President Saunteel Jenkins.

Jones did not seek reelection in 2021.

== U.S. House of Representatives ==
=== Elections ===
==== 2018–2019 ====
On December 5, 2017, Representative John Conyers resigned after sexual harassment allegations were made against him and that he had secretly used taxpayer money to settle a harassment claim. A special election was called to replace Conyers and Jones narrowly won the Democratic primary for the special election–the real contest in this heavily Democratic, black-majority district. No Republican qualified to run. Conyers had held the seat since 1965 (it had been numbered as the 1st from 1965 to 1993 and as the 14th from 1993 to 2013), and his lowest winning percentage was 77 percent.

However, in the Democratic primary for the general election, Jones was defeated by former state representative Rashida Tlaib. Prior to the general election, Jones filed to run as an independent write-in candidate, prompting criticism.

During the course of the election campaign, questions arose as to whether Jones could serve in her Detroit City Council post concurrently with serving in Congress, an unprecedented situation up to that point. An opinion by the Detroit Corporation Counsel, written in August 2018, stated that it was likely possible for Jones to legally serve in both capacities based on state law. The Counsel advised that the United States House Committee on Ethics be consulted to clarify federal and House rules.

In the November 6 special election, Jones won with 86.8 percent of the vote, facing only a Taxpayers Party candidate as opposition. On the same day, she received 633 votes in the regular election for a full two-year term.

Speaker Paul Ryan delayed swearing Jones in until November 29, after receiving guidance from the House Ethics Committee on how Jones could minimize conflicts of interest. She introduced two bills and cast 77 votes during her five-week tenure in the House of Representatives.

==== 2020 ====
On March 25, 2020, Jones filed to run again in the Democratic primary for Michigan's 13th congressional district against Tlaib. Tlaib was considered possibly vulnerable to a primary challenge, due to her status as a democratic socialist, divisive rhetoric and attacks made on popular national Democrats. For example, Tlaib booed former Secretary of State and 2016 Democratic presidential nominee Hillary Clinton. However, Jones's campaign was wracked by allegations of financial misconduct. Jones decisively lost the primary election to Tlaib 66%-34% on August 4. The margin of Jones's loss was considered to be large.

== Electoral history ==
Brenda Jones electoral history

2005 Detroit City Council primary
Party	Candidate	Votes	%	±%
Nonpartisan	Kenneth Cockrel Jr. (incumbent)	56,107	6.08%	
Nonpartisan	Maryann Mahaffey (incumbent)	51,180	5.55%	
Nonpartisan	JoAnn Watson (incumbent)	46,449	5.04%	
Nonpartisan	Sheila Cockrel (incumbent)	42,123	4.57%	
Nonpartisan	Barbara-Rose Collins (incumbent)	39,450	4.28%	
Nonpartisan	Alberta Tinsley-Talabi (incumbent)	39,369	4.27%	
Nonpartisan	Kwame Kenyatta	36,563	3.96%	
Nonpartisan	Monica Conyers	28,495	3.09%	
Nonpartisan	Martha Reeves	27,313	2.96%	
Nonpartisan	Ortheia Barnes	23,114	2.51%	
Nonpartisan	Jai-Lee Dearing	22,485	2.44%	
Nonpartisan	Brenda Jones	20,015	2.17%	
Nonpartisan	Hilmer Kenty	19,270	2.09%	
Nonpartisan	Keith B. Butler	18,578	2.01%	
Nonpartisan	Thomas Stallworth III (incumbent)	16,260	1.76%	
Nonpartisan	Alonzo W. Bates (incumbent)	15,137	1.64%	
Nonpartisan	Tia Tia Davis	13,790	1.50%	
Nonpartisan	Bettie Cook Scott	13,693	1.48%	
Nonpartisan	Roy McCalister, Jr.	11,931	1.29%	
Nonpartisan	Joan Gist	11,907	1.29%	
Nonpartisan	James Edwards	10,529	1.14%	
Nonpartisan	Ralph Simpson	10,318	1.12%	
Nonpartisan	Maureen Taylor	9,340	1.01%	
Nonpartisan	LaMar Lemmons III	9,268	1.01%	
Nonpartisan	Devon Jackson	8,840	0.96%	
Nonpartisan	Beverly Kindle-Walker	8,763	0.95%	
Nonpartisan	Marquita Reese	8,529	0.92%	
Nonpartisan	Joe Young	8,067	0.87%	
Nonpartisan	Vanessa Jones	7,805	0.85%	
Nonpartisan	Kevin White	7,682	0.83%	
Nonpartisan	Keith Hollowell	7,362	0.80%	
Nonpartisan	Kerwin Wimberley	7,283	0.79%	
Nonpartisan	Terry Davis	6,723	0.73%	
Nonpartisan	Richard Shelby	6,647	0.72%	
Nonpartisan	Otis Knapp Lee	6,590	0.71%	
Nonpartisan	Frank Archer	6,490	0.70%	
Nonpartisan	Ernest Flagg	6,381	0.69%	
Nonpartisan	Barry Blackwell	6,291	0.68%	
Nonpartisan	Orlando Maddox	6,224	0.68%	
Nonpartisan	James Wadsworth III	5,969	0.65%	
Nonpartisan	Sigmunt J. Szczepkowski	5,801	0.63%	
Nonpartisan	Sarah Snow	5,715	0.62%	
Nonpartisan	Karinda Washington	5,680	0.62%	
Nonpartisan	Karen Wahls	5,599	0.61%	
Nonpartisan	Palencia Mobley	5,227	0.57%	
Nonpartisan	Lee Yancy	5,071	0.55%	
Nonpartisan	Claud Dent	5,015	0.54%	
Nonpartisan	Randolph Williams	4,995	0.54%	
Nonpartisan	Dennis Vaughn	4,599	0.50%	
Nonpartisan	Gwendolyn Mingo	4,186	0.45%	
Nonpartisan	Joseph Vaughn	4,164	0.45%	
Nonpartisan	Harry Lewis	4,088	0.44%	
Nonpartisan	Earl Smith	4,064	0.44%	
Nonpartisan	D. Etta Wilcoxon	4,020	0.44%	
Nonpartisan	Craig Davis	3,889	0.42%	
Nonpartisan	Cheryl Hughley Clark	3,864	0.42%	
Nonpartisan	William Miller	3,630	0.39%	
Nonpartisan	Kyra Joy Hope	3,606	0.39%	
Nonpartisan	Delbert Jennings	3,530	0.38%	
Nonpartisan	Joanne Wormley-Corley	3,464	0.38%	
Nonpartisan	Barbara Herard	3,359	0.36%	
Nonpartisan	Cheryl Myhand	3,299	0.36%	
Nonpartisan	Loren Monroe	3,195	0.35%	
Nonpartisan	Keith Lee	3,087	0.34%	
Nonpartisan	Dana Cleveland	2,932	0.32%	
Nonpartisan	Anthony Marshall	2,911	0.32%	
Nonpartisan	Kenneth Gray	2,907	0.32%	
Nonpartisan	Maxine Mickens	2,907	0.32%	
Nonpartisan	Rick Scott	2,824	0.31%	
Nonpartisan	Rogelio Landin	2,712	0.29%	
Nonpartisan	Nathanial Smith Jr.	2,610	0.28%	
Nonpartisan	Carol Edwards	2,580	0.28%	
Nonpartisan	Patric Smith	2,578	0.28%	
Nonpartisan	Curtis Harris	2,489	0.27%	
Nonpartisan	Sandra Hall-Harmon	2,411	0.26%	
Nonpartisan	Louis Anderson	2,372	0.26%	
Nonpartisan	Lisa Milewski-Randles	2,367	0.26%	
Nonpartisan	Walter Hart Jr.	2,342	0.25%	
Nonpartisan	Kelvin Davis	2,298	0.25%	
Nonpartisan	Chevis Spratt Jr.	2,297	0.25%	
Nonpartisan	Ebony Godwin	2,290	0.25%	
Nonpartisan	Jeff Lewis	2,275	0.25%	
Nonpartisan	Marino Taylor	2,269	0.25%	
Nonpartisan	Evelyn Louis	2,212	0.24%	
Nonpartisan	Ricky Spann	2,183	0.24%	
Nonpartisan	Angel D. Mason	2,151	0.23%	
Nonpartisan	Angela Daniels	2,121	0.23%	
Nonpartisan	Elizabeth Osorio-Luna	2,115	0.23%	
Nonpartisan	Angles Hunt	2,111	0.23%	
Nonpartisan	Boyd Morson	2,081	0.23%	
Nonpartisan	Mattie Jones	2,053	0.22%	
Nonpartisan	Vera Kidd	2,052	0.22%	
Nonpartisan	Rubin Mann III	2,040	0.22%	
Nonpartisan	John Mackay	2,006	0.22%	
Nonpartisan	Joseph W. Holt	1,941	0.21%	
Nonpartisan	Brian Ellison	1,923	0.21%	
Nonpartisan	Rujeania Vance	1,911	0.21%	
Nonpartisan	Adrienne Kennedy	1,910	0.21%	
Nonpartisan	Marie Gunter	1,909	0.21%	
Nonpartisan	S. Denise Ratliff	1,842	0.20%	
Nonpartisan	Verdinna Jenkins	1,729	0.19%	
Nonpartisan	Charles Stedman	1,705	0.19%	
Nonpartisan	Larry Allen	1,702	0.18%	
Nonpartisan	Flora McDougal	1,676	0.18%	
Nonpartisan	Stanley Shelby	1,638	0.18%	
Nonpartisan	B. Thrasher Whisenhunt	1,539	0.17%	
Nonpartisan	Irma Jaxon	1,497	0.16%	
Nonpartisan	Irin Montgomery	1,483	0.16%	
Nonpartisan	Nathan Henry	1,472	0.16%	
Nonpartisan	Earnesteen Tyler	1,309	0.14%	
Nonpartisan	Al Allison	1,306	0.14%	
Nonpartisan	Damian Mitchell	1,286	0.14%	
Nonpartisan	DeLonda A. Browner	1,277	0.14%	
Nonpartisan	Nacio Thomas	1,239	0.13%	
Nonpartisan	Forest Holman	1,216	0.13%	
Nonpartisan	Renelius Bell	1,185	0.13%	
Nonpartisan	Albert Burden	1,143	0.12%	
Nonpartisan	Joe Yelder	1,117	0.12%	
Nonpartisan	Dobey Gavin	1,027	0.11%	
Nonpartisan	Write-ins	923	0.10%	
Nonpartisan	Caleb Coan III	716	0.08%	
Total votes		922,594	100.00%	

2005 Detroit City Council election
Party	Candidate	Votes	%	±%
Nonpartisan	Kenneth Cockrel Jr. (incumbent)	152,318	9.31%	
Nonpartisan	Monica Conyers	123,264	7.54%	
Nonpartisan	JoAnn Watson (incumbent)	122,060	7.46%	
Nonpartisan	Sheila Cockrel (incumbent)	119,183	7.29%	
Nonpartisan	Barbara-Rose Collins (incumbent)	116,329	7.11%	
Nonpartisan	Kwame Kenyatta	113,063	6.91%	
Nonpartisan	Alberta Tinsley-Talabi (incumbent)	108,664	6.64%	
Nonpartisan	Martha Reeves	92,421	5.65%	
Nonpartisan	Brenda Jones	90,669	5.54%	
Nonpartisan	Jai-Lee Dearing	87,299	5.34%	
Nonpartisan	Ortheia Barnes	75,299	4.60%	
Nonpartisan	Hilmer Kenty	72,874	4.46%	
Nonpartisan	Keith B. Butler	69,384	4.24%	
Nonpartisan	Tia Tia Davis	67,877	4.15%	
Nonpartisan	Thomas Stallworth III (incumbent)	67,216	4.11%	
Nonpartisan	Bettie Cook Scott	65,209	3.99%	
Nonpartisan	Alonzo W. Bates (incumbent)	57,473	3.51%	
Nonpartisan	Maryann Mahaffey (incumbent)	34,853	2.13%	
Total votes		1,635,455	100.00%	

2013 Detroit City Council at-large primary
Party	Candidate	Votes	%	±%
Nonpartisan	Saunteel Jenkins (incumbent)	51,917	34.23%	
Nonpartisan	Brenda Jones (incumbent)	45,524	30.02%	
Nonpartisan	David Bullock	15,734	10.38%	
Nonpartisan	Roy McCalister Jr.	13,397	8.83%	
Nonpartisan	Monica Lewis-Patrick	9,751	6.43%	
Nonpartisan	Angles Hunt	5,513	3.64%	
Nonpartisan	Cedric Banks	5,317	3.51%	
Nonpartisan	Jessica M. Rayford-Clark	4,507	2.97%	
Total votes		151,660	100.00%	

2013 Detroit City Council at-large election
Party	Candidate	Votes	%	±%
Nonpartisan	Brenda Jones (incumbent)	76,978	34.55%	
Nonpartisan	Saunteel Jenkins (incumbent)	76,941	34.54%	
Nonpartisan	David Bullock	39,000	17.51%	
Nonpartisan	Roy McCalister Jr.	29,855	13.40%	
Total votes		222,774	100.00%	

2017 Detroit City Council at-large primary
Party	Candidate	Votes	%	±%
Nonpartisan	Brenda Jones (incumbent)	46,110	45.29%	
Nonpartisan	Janeé Ayers (incumbent)	25,742	25.28%	
Nonpartisan	Mary D. Waters	17,190	16.88%	
Nonpartisan	Beverly Kindle-Walker	6,587	6.47%	
Nonpartisan	Alisa McKinney	6,185	6.08%	
Total votes		101,814	100.00%	

2017 Detroit City Council at-large election
Party	Candidate	Votes	%	±%
Nonpartisan	Brenda Jones (incumbent)	71,306	42.79%	
Nonpartisan	Janeé Ayers (incumbent)	48,103	28.87%	
Nonpartisan	Mary D. Waters	32,717	19.63%	
Nonpartisan	Beverly Kindle-Walker	14,522	8.71%	
Total votes		166,648	100.00%	

2018 Michigan Thirteenth Congressional district special Democratic primary
Party	Candidate	Votes	%	±%
Democratic	Brenda Jones	32,769	37.75%	
Democratic	Rashida Tlaib	31,121	35.85%	
Democratic	William R. Wild	13,174	15.18%	
Democratic	Ian Conyers	9,749	11.23%	
Total votes		86,813	100.00%	

2018 Michigan Thirteenth Congressional district Democratic primary
Party	Candidate	Votes	%	±%
Democratic	Rashida Tlaib	27,841	31.17%	
Democratic	Brenda Jones	26,941	30.16%	
Democratic	William R. Wild	12,613	14.12%	
Democratic	Coleman Young II	11,172	12.51%	
Democratic	Ian Conyers	5,866	6.57%	
Democratic	Shanelle Jackson	4,853	5.43%	
Democratic	Kimberly Hill Knott (write-in)	33	0.04%	
Democratic	Royce Kinniebrew (write-in)	2	0.00%	
Total votes		89,321	100.00%	

2018 Michigan Thirteenth Congressional district special election
Party	Candidate	Votes	%	±%
Democratic	Brenda Jones	169,330	86.84%	+9.74%
Constitution	Marc J. Sosnowski	17,302	8.87%	+8.87%
Green	D. Etta Wilcoxon	8,319	4.27%	+4.27%
Republican	David A. Dudenhoefer (write-in)	36	0.02%	−15.71%
Independent	Jonathan Lee Pommerville (write-in)	5	0.00%	+0.00%
Independent	Danetta L. Simpson (write-in)	1	0.00%	+0.00%
Total votes		194,993	100.00%	

2018 Michigan Thirteenth Congressional district election
Party	Candidate	Votes	%	±%
Democratic	Rashida Tlaib	165,355	84.2%	+9.74%
Working Class	Sam Johnson	22,186	11.30%	+11.30%
Green	D. Etta Wilcoxon	7,980	4.07%	−0.27%
Independent	Brenda Jones (write-in)	633	0.32%	−86.52%
Republican	David A. Dudenhoefer (write-in)	75	0.04%	+0.02%
Independent	Jonathan Lee Pommerville (write-in)	61	0.03%	+0.03%
Independent	Danetta L. Simpson (write-in)	3	0.00%	+0.00%
Independent	John Conyers III (write-in)	3	0.00%	+0.00%
Independent	Royce Kinniebrew (write-in)	2	0.00%	+0.00%
Independent	Kimberly Hill Knott (write-in)	1	0.00%	+0.00%
Independent	Jim Casha (write-in)	1	0.00%	+0.00%
Total votes		196,299	100.00%	

== See also ==
- David Curson, elected in a similar situation
- List of African-American United States representatives
- Women in the United States House of Representatives

U.S. House of Representatives
Preceded by John Conyers	Member of the U.S. House of Representatives from Michigan's 13th congressional district 2018–2019	Succeeded by Rashida Tlaib
U.S. order of precedence (ceremonial)
Preceded by Vance McAllister as Former U.S. Representative	Order of precedence of the United States as Former U.S. Representative	Succeeded by Trey Radel as Former U.S. Representative
