= James Craig (police chief) =

American police chief (born 1956)

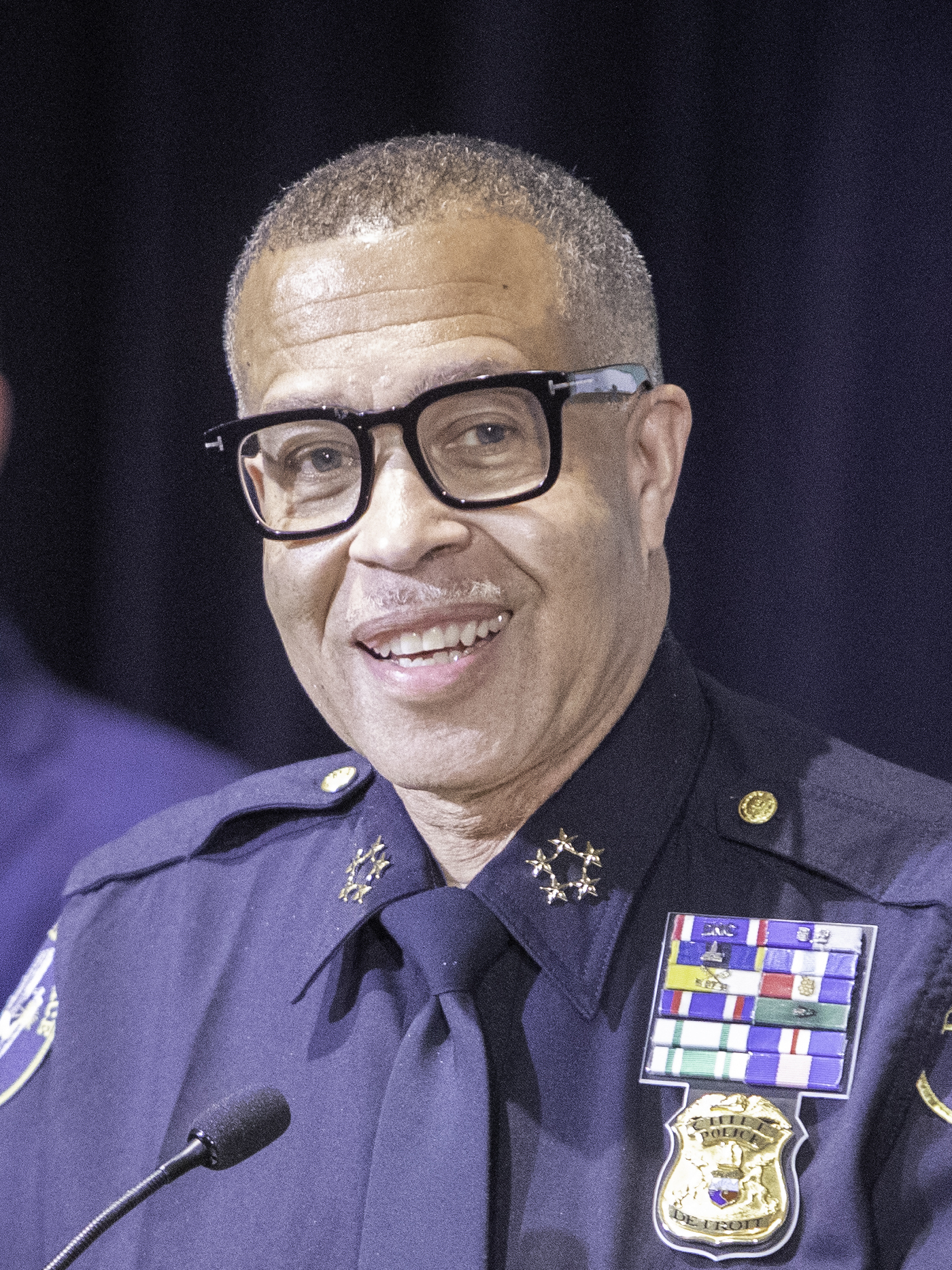
- Craig in 2021

Chief of the Detroit Police Department
- In office July 1, 2013 – June 1, 2021
- Mayor: Dave Bing; Mike Duggan
- Preceded by: Ralph Godbee; Chester Logan (interim)
- Succeeded by: James E. White

Chief of the Cincinnati Police Department
- In office August 2011 – June 2013
- Mayor: Mark Mallory
- Preceded by: Tom Streicher
- Succeeded by: Jeffrey Blackwell

Chief of the Portland (Maine) Police Department
- In office May 2009 – August 2011
- Mayor: Jill Duson; Nick Mavodones
- Preceded by: Timothy Burton
- Succeeded by: Michael Sauschuck

Personal details
- Born: 1956 (age 69–70) Detroit, Michigan, U.S.
- Party: Democratic (before 2011); Republican (2011–present)
- Children: 2
- Education: West Coast University (BS); University of Phoenix (MPA)
- Website: Campaign website

James E. Craig (born 1956) is an American law enforcement officer and politician who served as the chief of three municipal police departments: the Portland (Maine) Police Department (2009–11), the Cincinnati Police Department (2011–13), and the Detroit Police Department (2013–21). Prior to serving as a department chief, Craig had worked as an officer in the Detroit Police Department from 1977 to 1981 and in the Los Angeles Police Department from 1981 to 2009. At both Portland and Cincinnati, he was the first Black person to have served as the chief of police. Craig's tenure as Detroit police chief was the second-longest of any chief in the department's history.

A member of the Republican Party, after departing his position as chief of the Detroit Police Department Craig has had several unsuccessful campaigns for elected offices in the state of Michigan. In 2022 Craig was an unsuccessful candidate for the Republican nomination for governor, unsuccessfully fielding a write-in campaign after disqualified from the ballot for the Republican primary. Craig launched a campaign for the Republican nomination in the 2024 U.S. Senate election in Michigan, but withdrew prior to the primary. Craig ran in the nonpartisan 2025 Detroit mayoral election.

== Early life ==
Craig was born and raised in Detroit, Michigan. His father was a veteran of the U.S. Army and served as a reserve police officer at the time of the 1967 Detroit riot, when James Craig was in fifth grade. He graduated from Cass Technical High School and joined the Detroit Police Department in 1977.

== Early police career in Detroit and Los Angeles ==
Craig first worked at the Detroit Police Department from 1977 until he was laid off in 1981. After being laid off, he went to Los Angeles to work for the Los Angeles Police Department (LAPD) for 28 years.

During part of his tenure in Los Angeles, Craig served as president of the Oscar Joel Bryant Foundation, a Black officer's association with a membership of approximately 500. As president of the association, Craig downplayed accusations of institutional racism within the LAPD, commenting several weeks after the beating of Rodney King, "I believe that there are individuals who have racist attitudes, but racism is not widespread throughout the department." Several members of the association disagreed with this statement by Craig, and left the association in protest of it.

During his tenure in Los Angeles, Craig ascended ranks to become a captain. He served as a commanding officer, overseeing many of the more violent areas of the city, and received credit for crime-reduction using community-partnerships strategies that received praise for being "innovative". He ended his LAPD career as the commanding officer for West Los Angeles.

== Chief of the Portland (Maine) Police Department (2009–11) ==
From 2009 to 2011, Craig was police chief for the Portland Police Department in Portland, Maine, leaving the LAPD to take the appointment. Craig was the first Black chief in the history of the department. His annual salary in Portland ($91,000) was lower than his salary had been at the end of his LAPD career ($170,000). Additionally, Portland's department had fewer officers than the West Los Angeles Area of the LAPD the Craig had previously headed.

When Craig was appointed, Portland had experienced growth in its Black population due to an influx of refugee populations from Sudan and Somalia, yet only had four black officers in a 122-officer department. Craig, as an African American chief, was regarded as lending credibility to the department's messaging on criticisms relating to racial disparity and its actions towards addressing them, which had increasing become a challenge for the department. Incidentally, only days before Craig was sworn-in as chief, an officer had controversially shot a member of the refugee population. During his tenure, a CompStat-style process was implemented in the department, emphasizing command accountability and problem-solving. Some who praise his tenure have characterized this as contributing to a 10% violent crime reduction in the city. Craig also established a "Chief’s Community Advisory Board" to advise the department's community policing efforts.

One of Craig's responsibilities as chief was to approve concealed carry pistol licenses. He later recounted that it was during this time that his thinking on politics made him decide to privately identify as a Republican, as he believed Republicans more aligned with his newly-acquired strong support for individual rights to gun ownership, viewing commonplace gun ownership by law-abiding citizens to be a deterrent to crime.

At the time he was chief in Portland, the federal government (under the early Obama Administration) and several state governments at the time were considering reducing sentences for some drug offenses as part of greater efforts to address racial disparities caused by sentencing. One such move under consideration at the time had been lowering the sentencing for certain crimes connected to crack cocaine (for which persons of color are a disproportionate share of convicts) to be more in-line with the less harsh penalties of similar crimes connected to powder cocaine. However, Craig instead advocated that rather than lower crack cocaine sentences, Maine should instead harshen its sentences for powder cocaine crimes and reclassify several misdemeanor crimes connected to powder cocaine as felony crimes. Craig's suggestion was derided by Stanley Gerzofsky (the Maine Senate chair of the Maine Legislature's Criminal Justice and Public Safety Committee), who opposed enhancing drug crimes and argued that past enhancement of drug crimes in Maine had resulted in an ongoing issue of over-incarceration.

== Chief of the Cincinnati Police Department (2011–13) ==
From 2011 to 2013, Craig was chief of police for the Cincinnati Police Department in Cincinnati, Ohio. He took office in 2013, succeeding Tom Streicher's twelve-year tenure. Craig was the department's first African American chief. He was also considered Cincinnati's first police chief not to hail from the city prior to being appointed. During his tenure, the city's crime rate was at its lowest since 2000. Craig received praise for how he engaged with leaders of various community groups.

As chief, Craig received praise from the local Fraternal Order of Police for alterations he made to the department's officer uniforms, and changes to the policy on the length of work shifts.

Craig has received criticism for not acknowledging the impacts that institutional racism might have in the department, something which some organizations and community advocates in Cincinnati viewed to have been a missed opportunity. One such organization is the Sentinel Police Association, which represented the department's Black officers. Phil Black, the president of the association during Craig's tenure, criticized him for having failed to take action "level the playing field" within the department or address unfair disciplinary practices within the department. Other leaders of the association have criticized Craig's tenure for a lack of promotion of minority officers, arguing that when Craig appointed minority officers to new roles, he mainly only shuffled roles held by female and Black officers that were already in senior roles, as opposed to giving promotion to minority rank-and-file officers.

Craig departed Cincinnati after two years in order to accept appointment to the chief of police post in Detroit. He was succeeded as Cincinnati's chief by Jeffery Blackwell.

== Chief of the Detroit Police Department (2013–21) ==
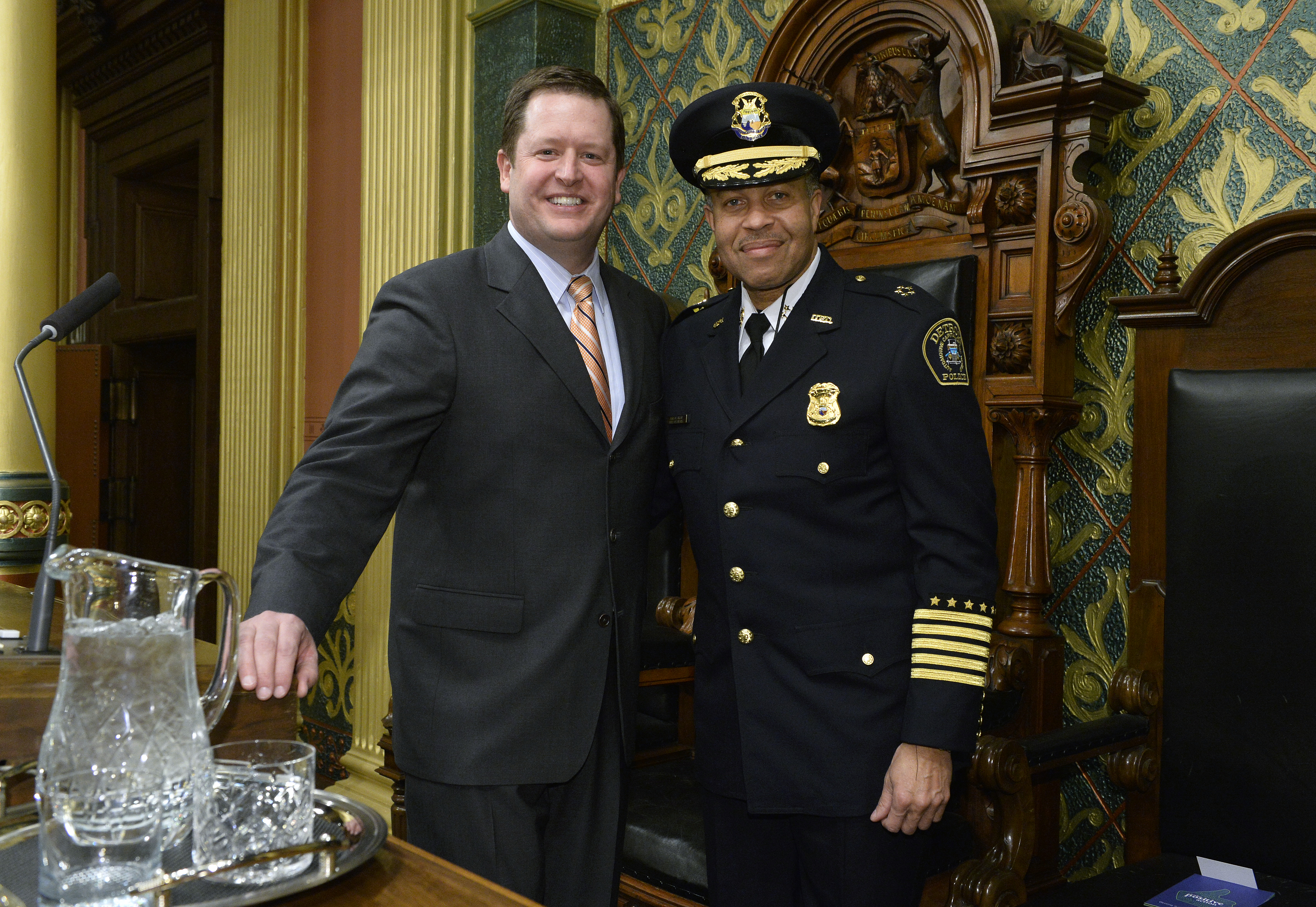
Craig (right) with Speaker of the Michigan House of Representatives Jase Bolger in 2014

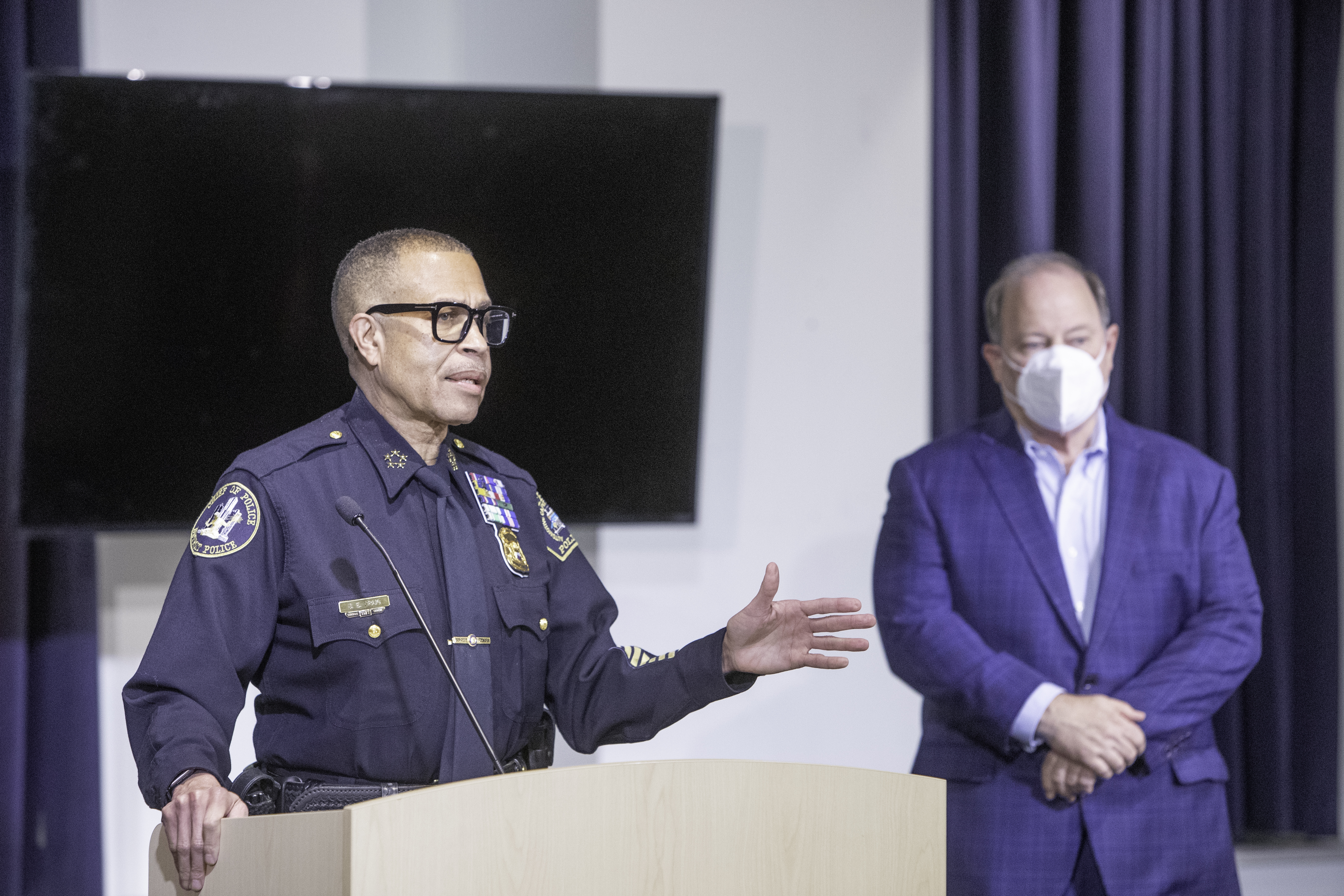
Craig (left), accompanied by Mayor Mike Duggan, announces his retirement

After he had initially worked with the Detroit Police Department earlier in his career, Craig had said he wouldn't go back to work for them unless he was offered the role of police chief. He was appointed police chief in 2013 by Detroit emergency manager Kevyn Orr. He replaced Chester Logan, who had held the position on an interim basis since the previous October when his predecessor, Ralph Godbee, was fired for having sexual relations with a subordinate. Craig officially took office on July 1, 2013.

Ahead of his tenure, the department that had seen high turnover in its leadership, with Craig being the city's fifth police chief in the same number of years. However, Craig's tenure ultimately disrupted this pattern of quick turnover, and he became the city's second-longest serving chief of police. He served until retiring in 2021.

When taking the position of chief 2013, Craig pledged to seek re-certification as a police officer in Michigan (as his previous certification had expired). However, he never followed-through on this. His lack of certification as an officer while chief would be reported on in October 2021 (several months after his retirement), generating some controversy for him.

In January 2016, Detroit Mayor Mike Duggan designated Craig to additionally hold the role of deputy mayor. Craig held this additional role for only a brief period of time.

=== Violent crime ===
In his first year as chief, homicide cases made a ten percent drop, from 332 to 300, between the year 2013 and 2014. In early 2014, Craig made national headlines for saying more armed citizens would decrease the crime rate. Craig claimed in 2017 that crime was steadily decreasing since his taking office in 2013, with data from a new software system employed by Detroit showing a 5 percent decrease in violent crime in 2016. The Federal Bureau of Investigation disputed his claim, and suggested violent crime had actually increased 15.7 percent between 2015 and 2016. Craig and others rejected their assessment. Detroit reported a 19 percent increase in homicide cases in 2020, with non-deadly shootings up 53 percent, though this was part of a trend of increasing crime nationwide, with homicide cases also rising above 50 percent in cities such as Boston and Chicago.

In Craig's last five months as police chief (January 1-May 31, 2021), homicides in Detroit were up 27% and non-fatal shootings increased 44%. Craig blamed the COVID-19 pandemic and George Floyd riots for the increase in crime.

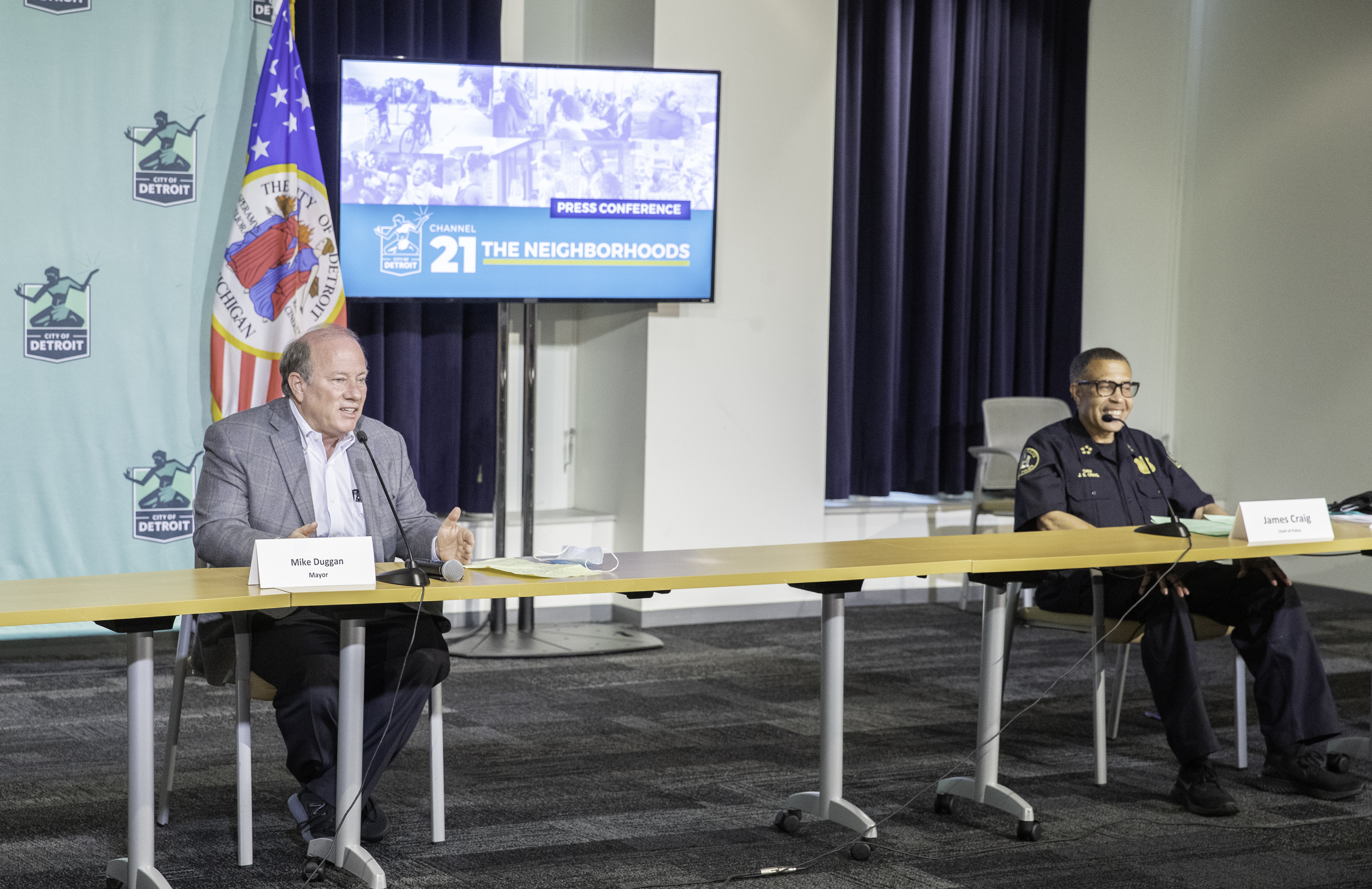
Craig (right) and Mayor Mike Duggan holding a press conference as part of the city's response to the COVID-19 pandemic

In 2020, Craig criticized the Drug Enforcement Administration and the Bureau of Alcohol, Tobacco, Firearms and Explosives, alleging that the two federal agencies had used Kenyel Brown as an informant. Craig pulled Detroit police officers out of a longstanding DEA-Detroit PDF task force. Craig also clashed with local judges and the Wayne County Prosecutor's Office, viewing bonds set for defendants as too low, and plea agreements and sentences too lenient. County Prosecutor Kym Worthy responded by suggesting that the police department's investigations were often inadequate, and upon Craig's departure as chief suggested that Craig was a "glory seeker."

At times, Craig made headlines by describing people involved in mass shootings in the city as "urban terrorists". In December 2015, Craig said that terrorists are unlikely to attack Detroit because so many residents have concealed carry permits.

In 2022, Duggan criticized Craig's record as police chief, noting that violent crime in Detroit did not decline until after the appointment, in June 2021, of James White as Craig's successor. At both the first year and the last year of Craig's tenure, Detroit was ranked by the FBI as the most violent large city in the United States.

=== Response Times and Project Green Light ===
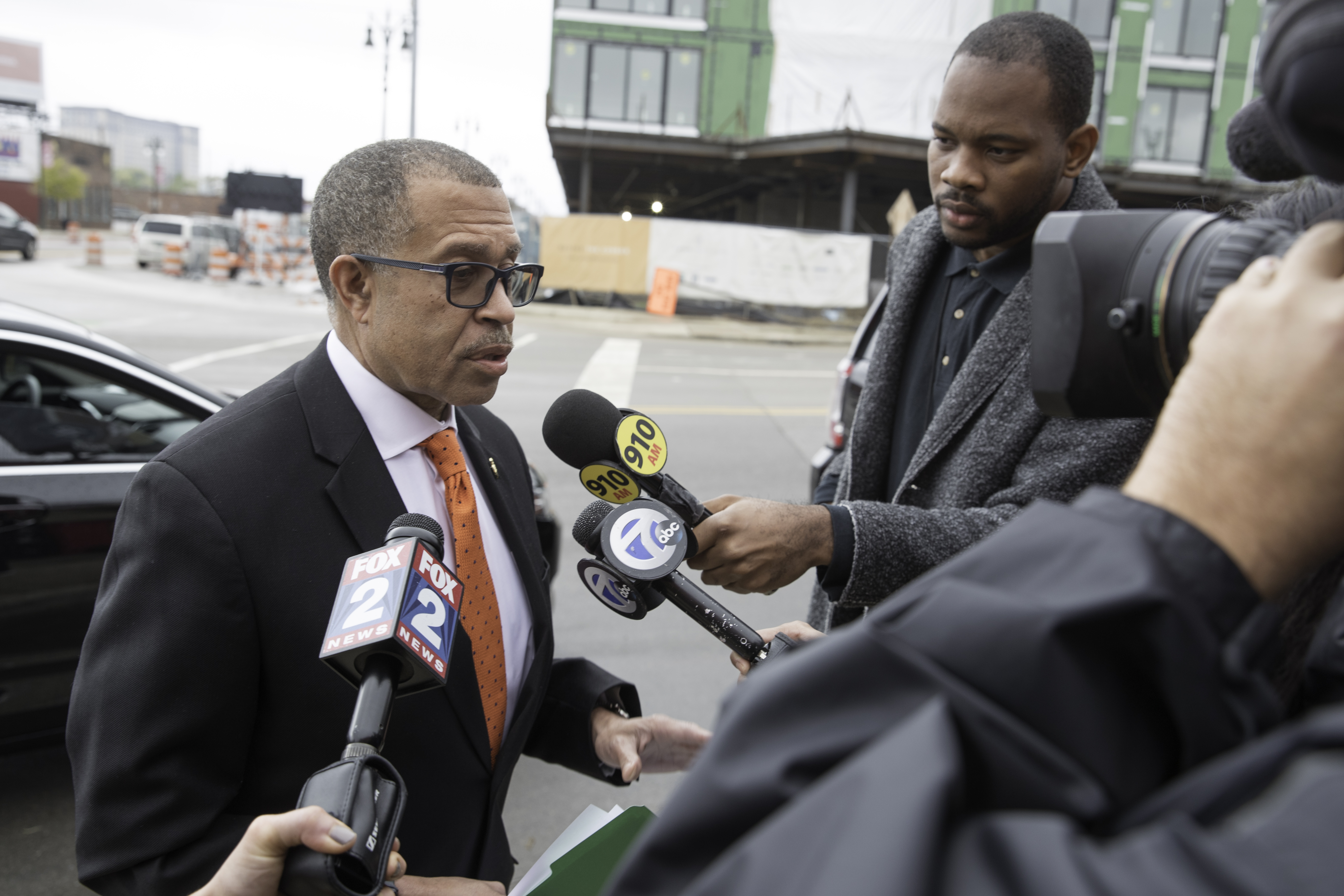
Craig speaking to news reporters in 2018 about Project Green Light

Craig was credited with playing a role in improved response times by the department during his tenure. However, questions were raised about response times varying by neighborhood. In February 2019, Police Commissioner Willie Burton questioned Craig and others about reporting in a Deadline Detroit news investigation that indicated that lower-income neighborhoods experienced worse response times than wealthier ones. Craig refuted the methods of Deadline Detroit's analysis, arguing that the greater amount of crimes in the city's poorest neighborhoods would explain worse response times, arguing that more crime, "means more runs, which take longer."

As police chief, Craig initiated "Project Green Light", a program aimed to give quicker police attention to businesses. The program provided the police with live stream of videos of businesses to aid them with better responding to crimes at establishments.

=== George Floyd protests ===
On May 28, (three days after George Floyd was murdered by Derek Chauvin – an officer of the Minneapolis Police Department), Craig voiced support for the Minneapolis Police Chief Medaria Arradondo's decision to quickly dismiss all four involved officers involved in Floyd's murder. Craig remarked that "preservation of trust in our communities is always a key mandate," and described Floyd's murder as "horrific and senseless". He additionally opined that the video of Floyd and Chauvin presented sufficient evidence for Chauvin to be charged with murder, and that Chauvin should be arrested on such charges.

Amid the national George Floyd protests, which included protests in Detroit, Craig enforced a curfew that Mayor Duggan ordered. Craig stated that he intended to support protester's First Amendment rights, and that the Detroit Police Department would "continue to support the message" that most protesters were representing, but also that the Department would not support property damage. Craig characterized the majority of individuals at protests in Detroit as conducting themselves in a peaceful and a non-violent manner. He blamed exceptions to this as largely being caused by "disrupt[ors]" from suburban communities of the Detroit Metro Area. He called for such individuals to steer clear of the city, remarking, "my message is simple. If you want to disrupt, stay home and disrupt in your own community".

Commenting on the concerns he understood to be expressed by most protesters, in June 2020 Craig said,

I feel like they feel. What happened to Mr. Floyd should have never happened; it was horrific. We're angry about it, but the best way to address our anger [is to] protest in a peaceful manner.

Despite Craig's declared support for peaceful protesters and their First Amendment rights, he and his department received criticism for their actions in handling such protesters. Filmmaker Kate Levy released a documentary in 2021 which both the Detroit Free Press and the Michigan chapter of the ACLU characterized as showing "shocking" evidence of police violence against protesters. ACLU Michigan published an opinion piece characterizing Craig's previous words of support for peaceful demonstrators as having been hallow, writing that with the release of the documentary, "the emptiness of [Craig's] words has been laid bare." The city government later paid $1 million to protesters to settle a federal lawsuit accusing Craig of authorizing excessive force by officers.

Craig made regular appearances on conservative media such as Fox News to provide commentary on the protests. He has derided protesters from the Black Lives Matter movement as "marxists". He has touted his handling of the protests in Detroit as superior to that of other large cities, and has spoken critically about the handling of Floyd protests in other jurisdictions.

=== Other matters ===
He has also initiated programs to cut gang membership and large scale sweeps aimed at finding people with outstanding warrants. In August 2019, Craig defended the police use of facial recognition software after the use of the technology was criticized by Congresswoman Rashida Tlaib. The Detroit Board of Police Commissioners ruled for the facial recognition policies to be limited to still images of suspects in criminal investigations, which Craig welcomed and heralded.

Craig opposed calls from the First Trump Administration for the police department to assist in federal immigration enforcement, telling the Detroit City Council,

We don’t do the immigration police work — we’re not going to. When we do traffic stops, we’re not interested in immigration status

== Political campaigns ==
=== 2022 Michigan gubernatorial election ===
In May 2021, it was reported Craig would be announcing his retirement from the Detroit police. He had previously met with Arizona Governor Doug Ducey, chair of the Republican Governors Association, and other Republican officials in talks about a potential run for governor of Michigan in 2022 against Democratic incumbent Gretchen Whitmer. On June 1, 2021, Craig retired after 44 years of service in law enforcement.

On September 14, 2021, Craig attempted to announce his bid for Governor on Belle Isle, but was unable to be heard due to the presence of protestors who surrounded him on the podium, chanting "No justice, no peace, James Craig is still police." He later made his official announcement atop a former General Motors building in Detroit. Craig was initially regarded to be the front-runner for the Republican nomination, receiving strong support among the state's Republican establishment (even receiving maximum individual contributions to his campaign committee from the state's two most-recent Republican governors: Rick Snyder and John Engler). He was also seen as having the advantage of being the only contender with large name recognition among a large field of Republican hopefuls.

During his campaign, Craig unsuccessfully sought the endorsement of Donald Trump, and declined to comment on Trump's false claim that the 2020 presidential election was "stolen" from him. Meshawn Maddock (co-chair-elect of the Michigan Republican Party) brought Craig to visit Trump at Mar-a-Lago in mid-2021 in an effort to earn his favor. Craig, however, was passed-over by Trump for an endorsement.

In October 2021, Craig faced criticism after reporting revealed that he was never certified as a police officer in Michigan while serving as Detroit Police Chief. Craig had promised to complete the certification process when he took the position in 2013 but never did so during his eight years as chief.

In May 2022, amid questions over the legitimacy of some signatures on his nominating petitions, Craig acknowledged possible fraud by signature gatherers. State election officials ruled that Craig, alongside four other Republican primary candidates, had failed to submit enough valid signatures to appear on the ballot, thus rendering him ineligible to compete for the party nomination. Craig filed a lawsuit in a bid to get on the primary ballot, but the suit was rejected by the Michigan Court of Claims. Craig then launched a write-in campaign for the Republican primary nomination, but wasn't able to garner more than 2.1% of the vote with the effort.

=== 2024 U.S. Senate campaign ===
On October 3, 2023, Craig announced he would be running for the United States Senate in 2024. He faced fellow Republican Mike Rogers, Nikki Snyder, and several other candidates for the Republican nomination. On February 13, 2024, he announced that he was suspending his campaign. He, however, expressed interest in running for Detroit mayor in 2025.

=== 2025 mayoral election ===
In March 2025, Craig announced his candidacy for mayor of Detroit, entering a field of candidates seeking to be elected as the successor of Duggan (who is not seeking re-election). The ballot in the election is nonpartisan, and the election will consist of a primary election followed by a general election between the top-two finishers.

Craig is the only candidate in the mayoral election who affiliates as a Republican. As a candidate, Craig has not distanced himself from his affiliation with the Republican Party or his past endorsements of Presidential Trump's campaigns (which all had received very little of the presidential vote in Detroit). Rather, Craig has touted these as strengths, arguing that he it would enable him to greater advocate to Trump on behalf of the city more effectively than other mayoral candidates might, touting himself as offering the city a "direct link" to the Trump White House.

Craig is regarded to have launched his campaign with the benefit of having some of the strongest name recognition among mayoral contenders. He was regarded to be one of the three best-known names to in the field of candidates, along with City Council President Mary Sheffield and pastor Solomon Kinloch Jr. He placed fifth in the primary election, with over 5% of the vote per preliminary returns.

== Political views and ideology ==
=== Party affiliation and ideology ===
Craig considers himself to be a conservative and is a member of the Republican Party. He has endorsed presidential candidacies of Donald Trump, and touts having voted for him.

Craig has claimed to have "transitioned" from once being a Democrat in his younger years to being a Republican. He has recounted that, when he working in Los Angeles, he was put-off by remarks made by Democratic U.S. Congresswoman Maxine Waters at a meeting of the Black Officers' Association held after the beating of Rodney King; regarding this moment to have been a political turning-point that altered his sentiments towards the Democratic party.

Craig has recounted his choice to privately identify as a Republican in his politics came after he revised his views on gun policy during his tenure as police chief in Portland (Maine), adopting a newfound position in support of individual citizens having robust rights to own and conceal carry firearms. Craig has claimed that his time in California (Los Angeles) had initially left him of the view to initially decline most conceal carry applications in Maine; but that others in the Portland department informed him that Maine was a more pro-gun state than California. He has further claimed that, having previously believed that lower proliferation of guns among the general public would be preferable to public safety, while in Maine he re-assessed his views on gun policy. He recounts this as being when he came to strongly support allowing civilians to concealed carry firearms, newly-adopting a belief that criminals could be deterred from criminal action by the knowledge that law-abiding citizens are likely to be carrying firearms.

In late 2021, the group Bridge Michigan questioned Craig's timeline for his re-alignment as a Republican after obtaining a 2012 Ohio voter registration application in which Craig voluntarily identified himself as a Democrat (the application did not require him to declare a party). Craig has answered that he does not remember "being a Democrat" in 2012, but asserted that that form would not be inconsistent with a "slow and steady" transition of becoming a Republican beginning with his time in Maine.

While serving as a police chief in Portland, Cincinnati, and Detroit, Craig kept his personal political affiliation private, only publicly declaring that he was a Republican after announcing his retirement as Detroit police chief in 2021.

=== Stances on issues ===
Craig strongly supports individual gun ownership rights, a stance which has led to him appearing twice on the cover of publications by the National Rifle Association (NRA). During his tenure as police chief of Detroit, he made an appearance on Fox News sharing his support for a broad pro-gun ownership interpretation of the Second Amendment. Craig credits the formulation of his current views on gun policy as motivating him to align with the Republican Party.

Craig has voiced criticism for Michigan Governor Gretchen Whitmer's response to the COVID-19 pandemic in Michigan, characterizing her as having acted like a monarch. Without offering alternatives to her actions, Craig has offered criticism of Whitmer's actions in restricting in-person school instruction and restricting the operations of non-essential businesses during periods of the pandemic.

Craig has criticized government "handouts" (federal assistance), characterizing them to establish a culture of dependency that he believes is especially pronounced in Black communities. Craig has also characterized the Democratic Party as promoting "victim mentality" and "liberal wokeism" that he has argued poses a threat to America's future. Craig has recounted these as being views he only adopted in the years after he decided he would privately consider himself a Republican. In late 2021, while running for governor, Craig voiced opposition to critical race theory, calling it "racist indoctrination" while speaking at an event at Hillsdale College.

Craig has taken a stance against abortion rights, supporting bans on abortions. He also defends the enforcement of voter ID laws

As police chief, Craig had expressed apparent support for the LGBTQ community, delivering remarks at a 2018 Black LGBTQ event in which he declared, "I love each and every one of you. We’re here for you". However, in April 2021, Craig voiced support for the prospective adoption of legislation in Michigan similar to Florida's "Don't Say Gay" legislation, arguing that Michigan should go further than the initial Florida legislation and restrict any classroom discussion of sexuality or gender identity through the sixth grade.

== Personal life ==
Craig has one son and daughter and has been married 4 times to 3 different women. His son, OVO James Craig, is a hip-hop artist.
