= Mary D. Waters =

American politician (born 1955)

Mary Waters
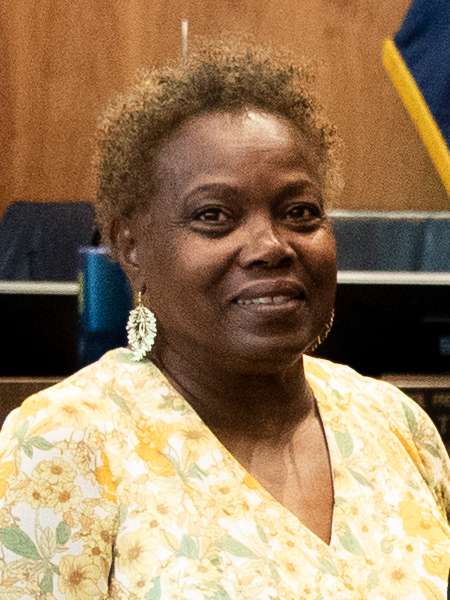
- Waters in 2024

Member of the Detroit City Council from the at-large district
- Incumbent
- Assumed office January 1, 2022
- Preceded by: Janeé Ayers

Member of the Michigan House of Representatives from the 4th district
- In office January 1, 2001 – January 2007
- Preceded by: Edward Vaughn
- Succeeded by: Coleman A. Young II

Personal details
- Born: August 27, 1955 (age 70) Alabama, U.S.
- Party: Democratic
- Education: Detroit Business Institute (attended); University of Michigan (BA)
- Website: Campaign website

Mary D. Waters (born August 27, 1955) is an American politician serving as an at-large member of the Detroit City Council since 2022. A member of the Democratic Party, Waters previously served as a member of the Michigan House of Representatives from 2001 to 2007, serving as the chamber's first Black minority leader from 2003 to 2006.

== Early life and education ==
Waters was born in Alabama on August 27, 1955. While in grade school, she picked cotton in Greenville, Alabama, but moved to Detroit as a teen, when her father found work with the auto industry. Waters attended the Detroit Business Institute. She earned a Bachelor of Arts from the University of Michigan, where she studied communications and behavioral sciences.

== Career ==
On November 7, 2000, Waters was elected to the Michigan House of Representatives where she represented the 4th district from January 10, 2001, to 2006. Waters served as the Minority Floor Leader for the state House from 2003 to 2006, being the first African-American woman to serve as Democratic floor leader in the chamber. Waters left office in 2006 due to term limits.

While in the Michigan legislature, Waters worked with Gretchen Whitmer who later became Michigan's governor. She often reminded her former colleague to take poverty-related issues like job training, insurance redlining and other maters related to Detroit seriously. She also backed candidate Whitmer by introducing her to Black church congregations in Detroit.

In 2010 Waters ran unsuccessfully for District 1 State Senator in the Democratic Primary.

2010 Michigan 1st Senate District Democratic Primary Election
| Party | Candidate | Votes | % |
|---|---|---|---|
| Democratic | Coleman Young II | 8,138 | 41.2 |
| Democratic | Lisa Nuszkowski | 5,701 | 28.9 |
| Democratic | LaMar Lemmons | 3,812 | 19.3 |
| Democratic | Mary D. Waters | 1,911 | 9.7 |
| Democratic | Dobey Gavin | 179 | 0.9 |

In 2021, Waters won an at-large seat on the Detroit City Council. While on the City Council she proposed establishing gun-free zones in the city's downtown area. She also opposed the sale of occupied, city-owned houses, calling it "Putting profit ahead of people."

In January 2022, Waters sought to succeed Brenda Jones as president of the Detroit City Council. The members of the council selected Mary Sheffield by a vote of 7-2.

In October 2023 she proposed eliminating all property taxes in Detroit.

== Legal Challenges ==
In October 2010, Waters pleaded guilty along with her former campaign manager, Sam Riddle, for their roles following allegations they conspired to bribe a Southfield, Michigan City Councilman, according to the U.S. Attorney’s office for the Eastern District of Michigan. In May 2010, Waters pleaded guilty to a misdemeanor charge of filing a false tax return. Later that year, she was sentenced to one year of probation on claims she received a $6,000 Rolex watch from a Southfield jewelry store. She later attempted unsuccessfully to withdraw her plea, and has since said that she was railroaded by "overzealous federal prosecutors" who really wanted Sam Riddle, her campaign manager. Riddle also pleaded guilty to conspiring with, then, Councilmember Monica Conyers, and other individuals, to disrupt commerce by extortion.

== Congressional campaign ==
On February 8, 2024, Waters announced that she would be running for United States Congress in Michigan's 13th Congressional District. On the campaign trail, she has called for a ceasefire in the Gaza war, and freeing of the hostages.

=== Results ===
Democratic primary results
| Party | Candidate | Votes | % |
|---|---|---|---|
| Democratic | Shri Thanedar (incumbent) | 44,546 | 54.9 |
| Democratic | Mary Waters | 27,408 | 33.8 |
| Democratic | Shakira Hawkins | 9,171 | 11.3 |
| Total votes | | 81,125 | 100.0 |
