= Congresswoman Jones =

Congresswoman Jones may refer to:

- Brenda Jones
- Stephanie Tubbs Jones
