= 2018 Michigan's 13th congressional district special election =

- November 6, 2018

Michigan's 13th congressional district
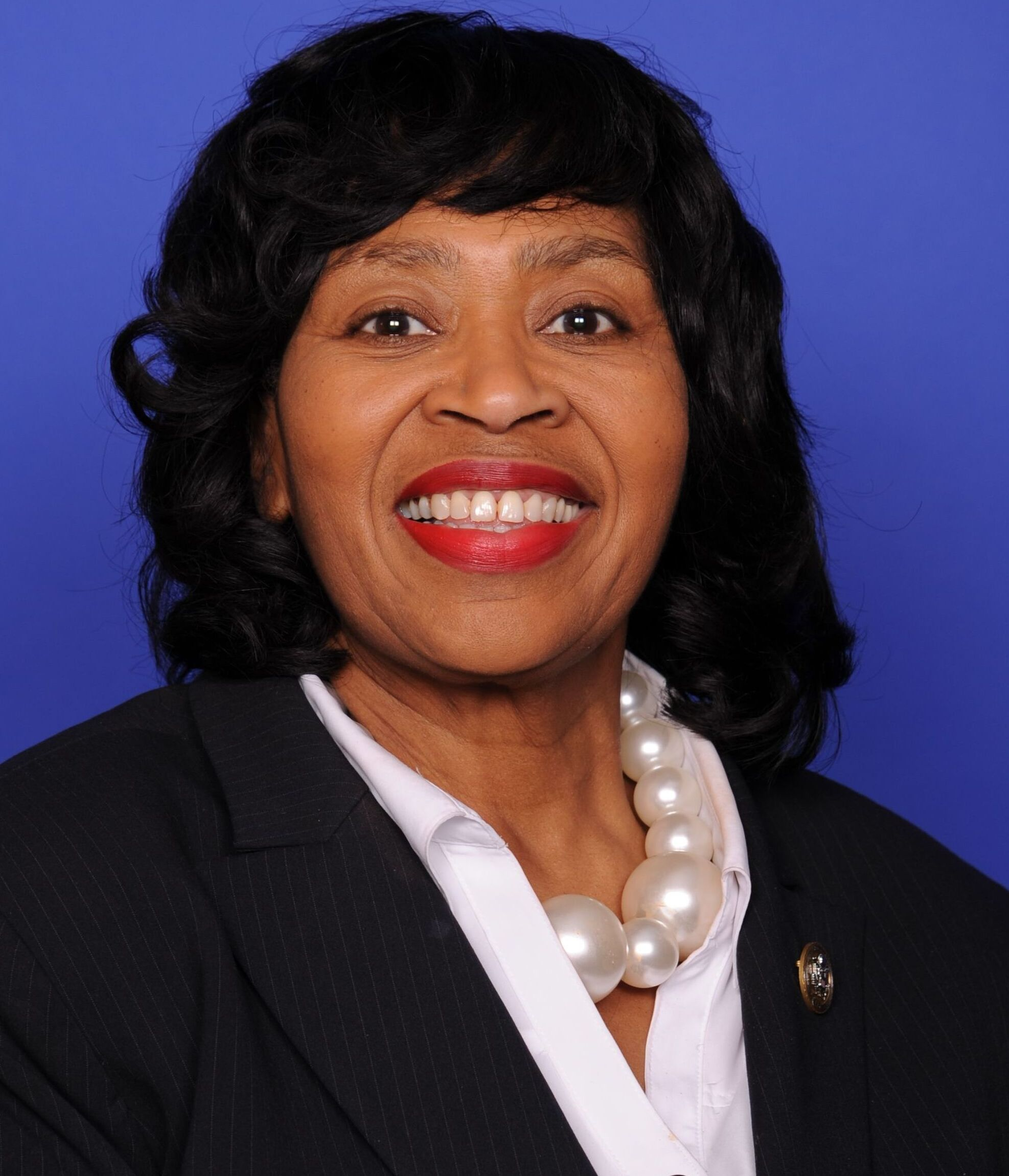

Nominee	Brenda Jones	Marc Sosnowski
Party	Democratic	U.S. Taxpayers'
Popular vote	169,330	17,302
Percentage	86.84%	8.87%
U.S. Representative before election
John Conyers
Democratic
Elected U.S. Representative
Brenda Jones
Democratic

A special election for Michigan's 13th congressional district was held on November 6, 2018, following the resignation of Democratic U.S. Representative John Conyers.

The Democratic primary was held on August 7, 2018. No Republican candidate ran in the special election, making the win in the Democratic primary tantamount to election in this district. Both the primary for this election and primary for the regular election were concurrent; similarly, the special election was held the same day as regular election. The winner of the regular Democratic primary was former State Representative Rashida Tlaib, who went on to win the regular general election.

The winner of the special Democratic primary was Detroit City Council President Brenda Jones, who served from November 29, 2018, to January 3, 2019.

== Background ==
Incumbent U.S. Representative John Conyers announced on December 5, 2017, that he would resign after a sexual harassment scandal. He had represented the 13th and its predecessors since 1965 (it was numbered as the 1st from 1965 to 1993 and as the 14th from 1993 to 2013), and was the longest-serving member of the House at the time.

Three days after Conyers' resignation, Governor Rick Snyder set a date for the special election. It was scheduled for November 6, 2018, concurrent with the regular election for a full two-year term. Primaries were held on August 7. The filing deadline for candidates was April 24, 2018. As a result, the 13th's seat remained vacant for nearly a year.

== Republican primary ==
=== Candidates ===
==== Failed to qualify ====
- David Dudenhoefer, author and photographer

== Democratic primary ==
=== Candidates ===
==== Declared ====
- Ian Conyers, state senator
- Brenda Jones, president of the Detroit City Council
- Rashida Tlaib, former state representative
- Bill Wild, mayor of Westland

==== Failed to qualify ====
- John Conyers III, hedge fund manager and son of former U.S. representative John Conyers (running as an independent)
- Kimberly Hill Knott, government relations, environmental justice

==== Withdrew ====
- Michael Gilmore, attorney and activist

==== Declined ====
- Warren Evans, Wayne County Executive
- Shanelle Jackson, former state representative and candidate for MI-13 in 2012 (running in MI-13 regular election)
- Greg Mathis, television personality and former judge
- Horace Sheffield, pastor and candidate for MI-13 in 2014
- Coleman Young II, state senator and candidate for mayor of Detroit in 2017 (running for MI-13 regular election)

=== Endorsements ===
Brenda Jones

Federal politicians

- Brenda Lawrence, U.S. representative (D-MI)

Local politicians

- Mike Duggan, mayor of Detroit
- Greg Mathis, 36th District County judge

Labor unions

- Michigan AFL-CIO
- United Autoworkers
Rashida Tlaib

Federal politicians

- Ro Khanna, U.S. representative (D-CA)

State politicians

- Ilhan Omar, Minnesota state representative

Organizations

- Emgage PAC
- Justice Democrats
- People for Bernie
- Progressive Change Campaign Committee

=== Results ===
Democratic primary results
Party	Candidate	Votes	%
Democratic	Brenda Jones	32,769	37.8
Democratic	Rashida Tlaib	31,121	35.8
Democratic	Bill Wild	13,174	15.2
Democratic	Ian Conyers	9,749	11.2
Democratic	Clyde Darnell Lynch (write-in)	2	0.0
Total votes		86,815	100.0

== General election ==
=== Campaign ===
Brenda Jones won the Democratic primary for the special election, but lost the Democratic primary for the regular election to Rashida Tlaib. Both the special primary and regular primary were held concurrently. Jones won the special election on November 6, and served for just over eight weeks.

=== Predictions ===
Source	Ranking	As of
The Cook Political Report	Solid D	May 4, 2018
Inside Elections/Rothenberg Political Report	Solid D	May 16, 2018
Sabato's Crystal Ball	Safe D	May 16, 2018

=== Results ===
2018 Michigan's 13th congressional district special election
Party	Candidate	Votes	%	±%
Democratic	Brenda Jones	169,330	86.84%	+9.74%
U.S. Taxpayers'	Marc Sosnowski	17,302	8.87%	N/A
Green	D. Etta Wilcoxon	8,319	4.27%	N/A
Write-in		42	0.02%	N/A
Total votes		194,993	100.00%	N/A
Democratic hold				
