= Monica Conyers =

American politician in Detroit, Michigan

President of the Detroit City Council
- In office September 18, 2006 – May 11, 2010
- Preceded by: Kenneth Cockrel Jr.
- Succeeded by: Kenneth Cockrel Jr.

Personal details
- Born: Monica Ann Esters; October 31, 1964 (age 61) Detroit, Michigan
- Spouse: John Conyers (m. 1990; died 2019)
- Children: 2

Monica Ann Conyers (Esters, October 31, 1964) is an American politician from Detroit, Michigan. Elected to the Detroit City Council in 2005, she was elected by its members to serve as president pro tempore of the council for the four-year term. She was convicted of accepting bribes in 2009 and sentenced to 37 months in prison.

== Background ==
Monica Ann Esters was born in River Rouge, Michigan, on October 31, 1965. She had four brothers and one sister. She grew up with her mother in west Detroit and attended Henry Ford High School. Her father had a record for breaking and entering. One of her brothers was imprisoned for robbery, and another for weapons violations. Esters graduated from high school and went to college, earning a Bachelor of Arts in Secondary Education and Political Science from Bennett College. She also completed a master's in Public Administration from Central Michigan University. Conyers later attended the University of the District of Columbia School of Law and received a Juris Doctor.

== Career ==
Monica Conyers worked as a teacher for mentally challenged teens. She was selected for jobs in school administration and became a vice administrator for Detroit Public Schools. Conyers got more involved with politics. She is a member of the Democratic Party.

In 2005, Conyers ran and was elected to a four-year term on the Detroit City Council. At that time, all candidates ran at-large, meaning they had to attract a majority of votes across the city. She was elected by other members to serve as president pro tempore, and Kenneth Cockrel, Jr. was elected to serve as President of the City Council.

In 2008 a turbulent time for Detroit Mayor Kwame Kilpatrick ended with his resignation at midnight on September 19, 2008. At that time council president Kenneth Cockrel, Jr. succeeded him as mayor of Detroit until a special election could be held. In keeping with the city charter, Monica Conyers advanced from president pro tem of the city council to president.

The special election for mayor was held on May 5, 2009. Kenneth Cockrel, Jr. ran for the office, but he was defeated by Dave Bing. Conyers initially wanted to investigate whether the city charter guaranteed her being able to keep the position as President of City Council. She learned that it did.

But after learning that the council's legal analyst position was that Cockrel had rights to return to the position of Council President, she decided not to contest the changes. She returned to president pro tempore for the remainder of her term.

== Positions and votes ==
Conyers has sometimes made headlines for breaking with her colleagues in the Michigan Democratic Party and the city council (which consists entirely of Democrats). She was critical of the party for running ads in a mayoral race in Flint, Michigan. During the lengthy legal and political crisis of Detroit Mayor Kwame Kilpatrick, Conyers was the only member of council to vote against a resolution demanding that he resign.

== Controversies ==
=== Synagro bribery scandal and conviction ===
On June 16, 2009, it was reported that Conyers had been linked to an ongoing corruption investigation in Detroit, involving alleged bribes offered by Synagro Technologies. Originally, case documents had referred only to "Council Member A" receiving bribes totaling more than $6,000 to influence passage of a contract with the city, but on June 16 the United States Attorney's Office confirmed that two Synagro representatives had named Conyers as the recipient.

Conyers was given a pre-indictment letter and offered a plea deal in the case. On June 26, 2009, Conyers was charged with conspiring to commit bribery and pleaded guilty.

On June 26, 2009, Conyers pleaded guilty to accepting a bribe in the Synagro Sludge scandal. Three days later, Conyers officially resigned from the Detroit City Council, effective July 6. Her former chief of staff, Sam Riddle, faced prosecution as well. Riddle's later trial included wiretap recordings of conversations with and about Conyers, in which he describes her as "crazy." Testimony given during Riddle's trial on February 4, 2010, indicated that Conyers often left a downtown Detroit restaurant without paying for the meal; the restaurant's owner estimated that Conyers owed him about $3,000. On March 10, 2010, Conyers was sentenced to 37 months in federal prison. During the sentencing hearing, Conyers requested to withdraw her guilty plea, which the judge denied. She filed notice to appeal.

=== Financial ===
In January 2009, Detroit's General Retirement System notified Conyers that she owed $5,600 to the city, which included travel advances not spent on business-class airfare to London. The pension board also claimed she had not submitted receipts for trips to Grand Cayman and Philadelphia.

In April 2009, Conyers admitted she had helped her brother, Reggie Esters, a convicted felon, obtain a city job that was originally scheduled to last four months. It was extended to two years, ending only when Esters' absenteeism became an issue. Esters is reported to have submitted a false resume. She originally denied helping her brother.

=== Personal/professional conduct ===
In February 2008, The Detroit News reported details of an exchange between Conyers and DeDan Milton, an aide to Mayor Kilpatrick. Conyers allegedly made reference to a gun in an argument with Milton. Conyers has denied the allegations. The police reports have since been withdrawn.

In April 2008, Conyers got into an argument with City Council President Ken Cockrel, Jr. during a public hearing. Cockrel reprimanded Conyers for interrupting fellow councilwoman JoAnn Watson, and Conyers turned on Cockrel. The argument escalated until Conyers referred to Cockrel as "Shrek", after the animated film character. Cockrel tried to call for a recess, but Conyers continued insulting him. Video of the incident exists on YouTube.

In February 2009, Conyers was involved in a confrontation with fellow council member Kwame Kenyatta. After Kenyatta insisted that Conyers submit in writing her request to cut his budget, Conyers insulted Kenyatta about his hearing aid, health, and lack of education. Conyers stated that Kenyatta needed to "learn how to talk to a woman", to which Kenyatta replied that when he was with a woman, he would do so. Conyers had to be restrained by a council staffer and a council security officer as she attempted to approach Kenyatta. Conyers later sent an apology letter, which was rejected by Kenyatta; he thought it was insincere. Conyers subsequently said that re-election "might not be worth it," in view of the constant public criticism of her.

In February 2009, the Detroit Free Press editorial board opined that Conyers was no longer fit for office due to her increasingly "volatile" behavior.

In March 2009, Conyers led a group of five members of the Detroit City Council who blocked the proposed transfer of ownership of Detroit Cobo Hall (the home of the North American International Auto Show) to a regional authority. The latter was to have representatives from Wayne, Oakland and Macomb counties, which make up the metropolitan area.

Council hearings about the proposed deal became heated. She said to Isaac Robinson, a white official of the Teamsters union, that most of the people who customarily worked at the large annual show "don't look like me. They look like you." When questioned about her remarks, she denied any intention of racism. Conyers said, "Black people cannot be racist".

The subject reportedly lost her weekend radio show job at 910 AM Superstation (WFDF-AM) primarily for unapproved hotel lodging expenses in March 2017.

In 2022, Conyers filed to run for Wayne County Executive. She was ruled ineligible to run due to her being a convicted felon.

== Bribery conviction ==
On June 16, 2009, the United States Attorney's Office said that two Synagro Technologies representatives had named Monica Conyers as having received bribes from the company totaling more than $6,000, paid to influence passage of a contract with the City of Detroit. The information was gathered during an FBI investigation into political corruption in the city, and Mayor Kwame Kilpatrick was also named in the probe.

Conyers was given a pre-indictment letter, and offered a plea bargain deal in the case. On June 26, 2009, she was charged with conspiring to commit bribery. She pleaded guilty. On March 10, 2010, she was sentenced to 37 months in prison, and also received two years of supervised probation.

She served her time at the Alderson Federal Prison Camp in West Virginia. She was released from prison after 27 months on December 21, 2012, and began supervised probation. She was admitted to a residential re-entry program in the Detroit area. She was released to home confinement in the Detroit area on January 25, 2013. Federal Bureau of Prisons spokesman Ed Ross said Conyers earned 108 days of credit for good behavior, and she was released from federal custody officially on May 16, 2013. To fulfill the work requirement for her parole, Conyers worked part time as a cashier for an auto parts store and as a ticket agent at the Greyhound Station.

== Personal life ==
On June 4, 1990, Esters married John Conyers, a long-serving Congressman from Detroit. She was 25, and he was 61. They had two sons together, John James Conyers III and Carl Edward Conyers.

In October 2015, the Detroit Free Press reported that Conyers had filed for divorce in Wayne County Circuit Court from September 3, 2015, after 25 years of marriage. The filing cited "a breakdown of the marriage relationship to the extent that the objects of matrimony have been destroyed and there remains no reasonable likelihood that the marriage can be preserved." In 2016, the divorce action was ended and the couple remained married, until his death in 2019.
