= Saunteel Jenkins =

American politician (born 1970)

President of the Detroit City Council
- In office January 1, 2014 – November 7, 2014
- Succeeded by: Brenda Jones

Member of the Detroit City Council
- In office January 1, 2010 – November 7, 2014

Personal details
- Born: November 18, 1970 (age 55) Detroit, Michigan, U.S.
- Party: Democratic
- Education: Wayne State University (BA, MSW)

Saunteel A. Jenkins (born November 18, 1970) is an American social worker, nonprofit executive, and politician who served as a member of the Detroit City Council from 2010 to 2014. A member of the Democratic Party, Jenkins served as the CEO of The Heat and Warmth Fund from 2014 to 2025. She was a candidate in the 2025 Detroit mayoral election.

== Early life and career ==
Jenkins was born in Detroit to Jo Lillian Jenkins and Louis Willis. She lost her 14-year-old brother, JoVan Willis, to gun violence in 1991. She has one sister.

She graduated from Detroit's Cass Technical High School and Wayne State University's School of Social Work, where she earned both bachelors and masters degrees. While at Wayne State University, Jenkins interned for Detroit City Council President Maryann Mahaffey, and ultimately served as her chief of staff from 1999-2004. A social worker, Jenkins served as director of the substance abuse treatment center at Mariner's Inn, a homeless shelter for men in Detroit.

== Political career ==
=== City Council ===
Jenkins was first elected to Detroit City Council in 2009 and was named president. She was re-elected in 2013 as one of two at-large members. She resigned from City Council in November 2014 to become the CEO of The Heat and Warmth Fund.

=== 2025 mayoral campaign ===
In January 2025, Jenkins entered the 2025 Detroit mayoral election. She is running on a platform of strengthening neighborhoods, increasing workforce development efforts, supporting small businesses, and improving public safety, education, and public transit. Jenkins has been endorsed by The Detroit News, Michigan Chronicle, and Planned Parenthood Advocates of Michigan. Jenkins placed third in the primary election.

== Nonprofit career ==
Jenkins resigned from City Council in 2014 to become CEO of The Heat and Warmth Fund (THAW), a 501(c)3 nonprofit founded in 1985 to help Detroiters pay utility bills. Under Jenkins's leadership, the organization expanded to also provide assistance with water bills and home repairs, distributing more than $100 million for these efforts. Jenkins resigned from THAW in January 2025 to run for mayor of Detroit.

== Personal life ==
Jenkins married Carl Bentley in 2010. In 2020, she battled a stage 3 breast cancer diagnosis and today is cancer-free. She lives in the Elmwood Park neighborhood of Detroit.
