= Mary Sheffield =

Mayor of Detroit since 2026

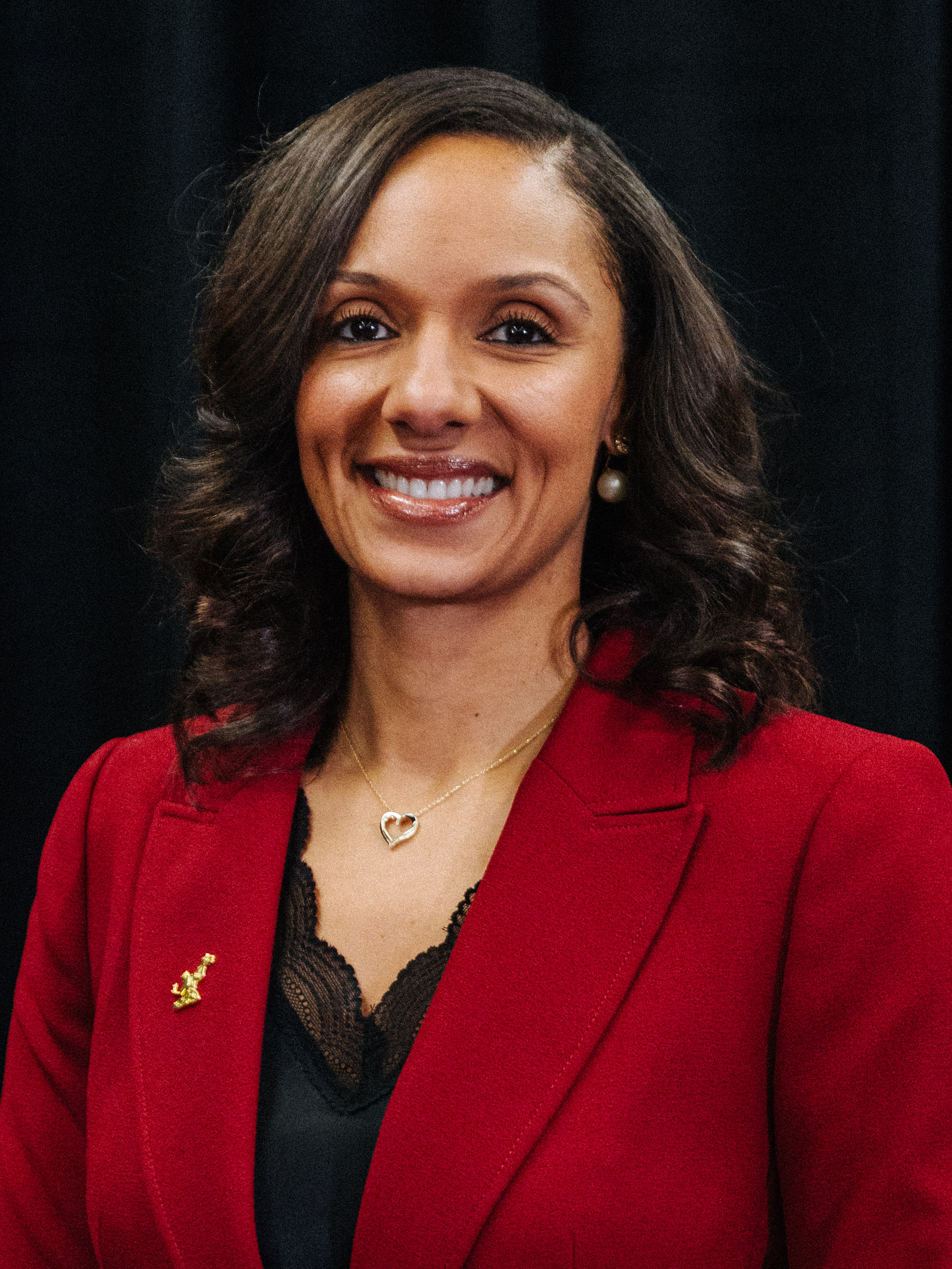
- Sheffield in 2026

76th Mayor of Detroit
- Incumbent
- Assumed office January 1, 2026
- Preceded by: Mike Duggan

President of the Detroit City Council
- In office January 1, 2022 – January 1, 2026
- Preceded by: Brenda Jones
- Succeeded by: James Tate

Member of the Detroit City Council from the 5th district
- In office January 1, 2014 – January 1, 2026
- Preceded by: Constituency established
- Succeeded by: Renata Miller

Personal details
- Born: June 9, 1987 (age 39) Detroit, Michigan, U.S.
- Party: Democratic
- Spouse: Rickey Jackson (m. 2025)
- Parent: Horace Sheffield III (father)
- Education: Wayne State University (BA); Central Michigan University (MPA)

Mary Christine Sheffield (born June 9, 1987) is an American politician who is serving as the 76th mayor of Detroit since January 2026. A member of the Democratic Party, she is the first woman to serve as mayor of Detroit. She previously served on the Detroit City Council from 2014 to 2026, and was president of the City Council from 2022 to 2026, the youngest person ever to hold that office.

== Early life and career ==
Sheffield grew up on the west side of Detroit. She is the daughter of Horace Sheffield III, a civil rights activist and pastor at New Destiny Christian Fellowship Church. Sheffield earned a bachelor's degree in public affairs from Wayne State University in 2008. She earned a master's degree in public administration from Central Michigan University.

While she attended college, Sheffield met Benny Napoleon, the sheriff of Wayne County. He recruited her to work in the county jail system as a disciplinary hearing officer. In 2010, Sheffield ran in the election to represent the fourth district in the Michigan House of Representatives, where Coleman Young II was not seeking reelection. In the Democratic Party primary election, Sheffield lost to Maureen Stapleton. By 2013, Sheffield was the co-pastor of New Destiny Christian Fellowship Church.

== Detroit City Council ==
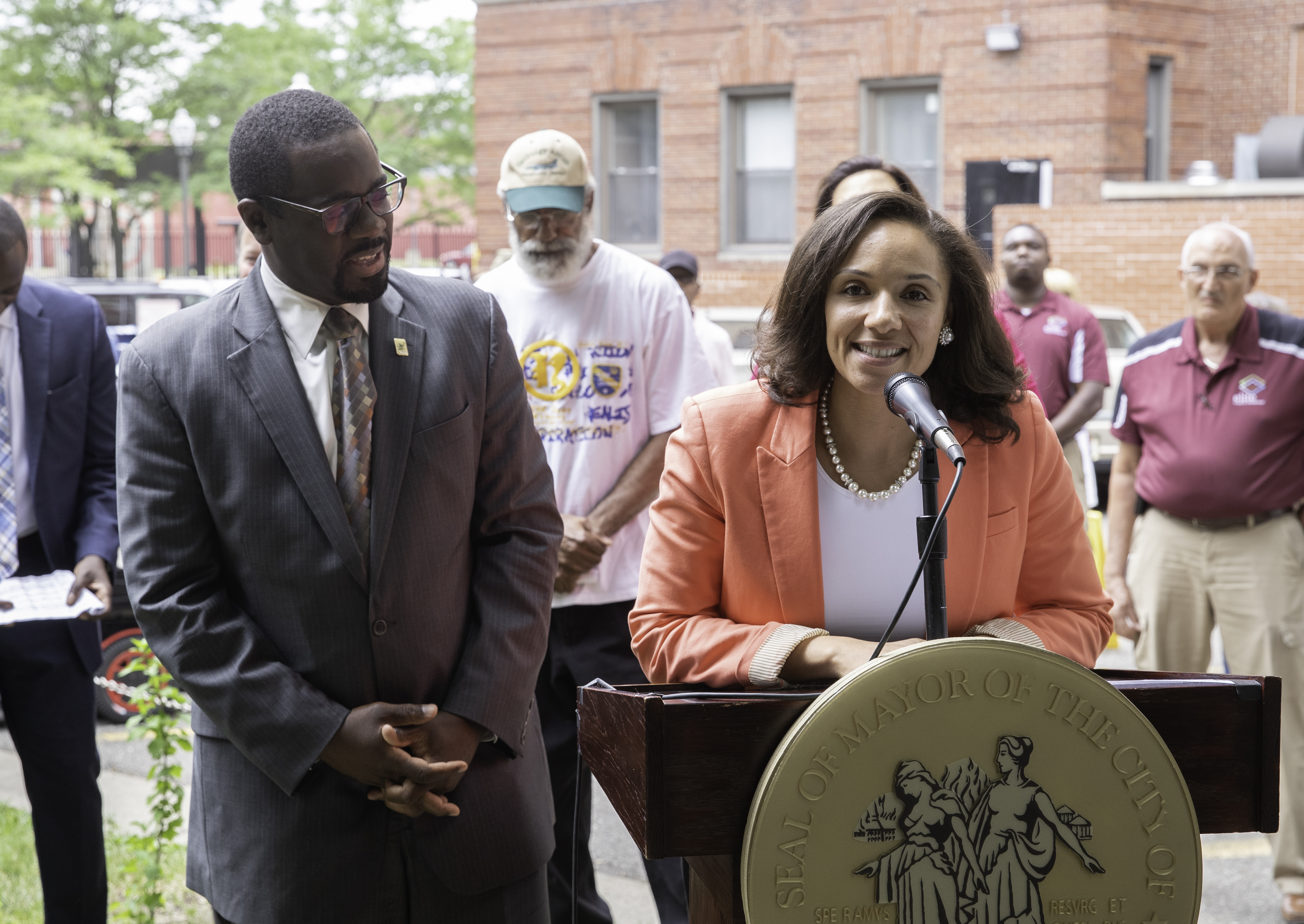
Sheffield speaking at a Michigan State Housing Development Authority event in 2019

In 2013, Sheffield ran for the Detroit City Council seat for the fifth district. She defeated Adam Hollier in the non-partisan November general election. At age 26, Sheffield became the youngest Detroit council member in history. She won reelection in 2017 against Jewel Ware, a Wayne County commissioner, and was reelected in 2021 without opposition.

In January 2022, the members of the council elected Sheffield to serve as council president over Mary D. Waters, succeeding Brenda Jones. She became the youngest president of the council.

== Mayor of Detroit ==
In August 2023, Sheffield set up an exploratory committee for a candidacy for mayor of Detroit in the 2025 election, hiring Nick Rathod as an advisor. Following the decision of Mike Duggan, the incumbent mayor, to not seek another term, Sheffield announced her candidacy to succeed him in December 2024.

During her mayoral campaign she campaigned on investing in underserved neighborhoods, saying in her primary election victory speech, "I do believe that our neighborhoods need more investment without a doubt. We are going to elevate issues and ensure that we're bringing more attention to our communities."

Sheffield placed first in the primary election, and advanced to the general election in November. She defeated Solomon Kinloch Jr., becoming the first woman to be elected mayor of Detroit. She was sworn into office on January 1, 2026. In September 2026, she announced her administration invested $2 million in after school programs. She launched a “State of Youth” tour visiting multiple schools in Detroit as part of the “Occupy the Summer” initiative. Her adminsitration launched the “Project 1000” initiative to build 1,000 houses in Detroit neighborhoods by 2031.

== Personal life ==
In December 2025, Sheffield married Rickey Jackson Jr., a program manager for a nonprofit organization. Jackson is also the brother of WNBA player Rickea Jackson.

== See also ==
- List of mayors of the 50 largest cities in the United States
- List of first African-American mayors

Political offices
Preceded by Mike Duggan	Mayor of Detroit; 2026–present	Incumbent
