= Triumph Church =

Charismatic megachurch in Michigan

Coordinates: 42°16′33″N 83°28′56″W

- Triumph Church
- Location: Triumph Church East Campus; 2760 E. Grand Blvd; Detroit, Michigan 48211
- Country: United States
- Denomination: Non-denominational Charismatic Christianity
- Website: www.triumphch.org

History
- Founded: Fall 1920
- Founder: Claude Cummings

Triumph Church is a non-denominational evangelical multi-site megachurch based in Southfield, Michigan. It was founded in the fall of 1920 by Claude Cummings as the Triumph Missionary Baptist Church. The Reverend Solomon Kinloch Jr. is currently the senior pastor. The church has six weekend and three midweek services, and its average attendance makes it one of the largest churches in Southfield, Michigan (near Detroit, Michigan).

In the last few years, the church has been recognized for its rapid growth. According to Outreach Magazine, it was the third-fastest-growing church in the United States in 2008, with more than 2,000 new members formalizing their commitment to the church. That growth continued through 2013, when the church topped the same list with 3,800 new members.

== Locations ==
Triumph Church is a multi-site church and provides nine weekly worship services at five different sites in Metro Detroit. It has a worship facility in the New Center, Detroit, area. Additional Sunday worship services are held at Canton High School in Canton, Michigan, and at the Millennium Centre (known as the North Campus) in Southfield, Michigan. In January 2010, Triumph Church relocated some of its services, which had been held at Cass Technical High School's 1100-seat auditorium, to the 2,700-seat Detroit Opera House.

== Worship style ==
Although Triumph Church traces its beginnings to a Missionary Baptists organization, as part of the "seeker sensitive" movement, it does not publicize its traditional Baptist ties, as research indicates new believers are less drawn to traditional forms of church activities and worship.

== Leadership ==
Solomon Kinloch Jr. is the senior pastor of Triumph Church. He has been a minister since the age of 14, starting at the New Bethel Baptist Church in Detroit. In 1998, Kinloch was hired as the pastor of Triumph Baptist Church in Detroit, Michigan. Kinloch served on the board of the Southern Christian Leadership Conference and the New Market Tax Credit Advisory Board.

== Recognition ==
In 2009, Outreach Magazine named Triumph Church the third-fastest-growing church in the United States, with over 2,000 new members in 2008. In 2012, Outreach Magazine named Triumph Church one of the top 100 largest churches in the United States, with nearly 10,000 in attendance each week.
