= Carla Walker-Miller =

American businesswoman and entrepreneur

- Citizenship: American
- Education: Tennessee State University(BS in civil engineering)
- Alma mater: Tennessee State University
- Occupation: businesswoman
- Employer: Walker-Miller Energy Services
- Children: 2
- Awards: 2021 Southeastern Michigan Business Hall of Fame, 2020 Inc. Female Founders 100, "50 Black Women Over 50" Honoree

Carla Walker-Miller is an American businesswoman and entrepreneur, and Detroit booster. She is the founder and CEO of Walker-Miller Energy Services.

== Early life and education ==
Walker-Miller has said she chose engineering as a career due to her concerns about how to afford college, so she chose a profession that had the best earning potential without an advanced degree. She received a full scholarship and completed a BS in civil engineering from Tennessee State University in Nashville.

== Career ==
Walker-Miller founded Walker-Miller Energy Services in 2000. Before the Great Recession, she sold a wide range of energy equipment, similar to the work she had done for an engineering firm before founding her own company. She then shifted her business towards offering energy-efficiency evaluations, and Walker-Miller Energy Services made the Inc. 5000 list of fastest growing private companies five times between 2007 and 2016. As CEO, Walker-Miller has also adopted a $15 minimum wage and a policy against the exclusion of people with a criminal history from employment.

In 2014, she was selected to participate in the Goldman Sachs 10,000 Small Businesses program, and received intensive training. She has since credited the program with helping the success of her business. As of 2018, company contracts include utility companies in Michigan, Ohio and Illinois.

In 2020, she was elected to a three-year term on the Board of Trustees at The Henry Ford.

She also is a public speaker.

== Honors and awards ==
- 2021 Southeastern Michigan Business Hall of Fame
- 2020 Inc. Female Founders 100
- "50 Black Women Over 50" Honoree

== Personal life ==
Walker-Miller has twin sons.
