= Solomon Kinloch Jr. =

American pastor and political candidate

The Reverend Solomon Kinloch
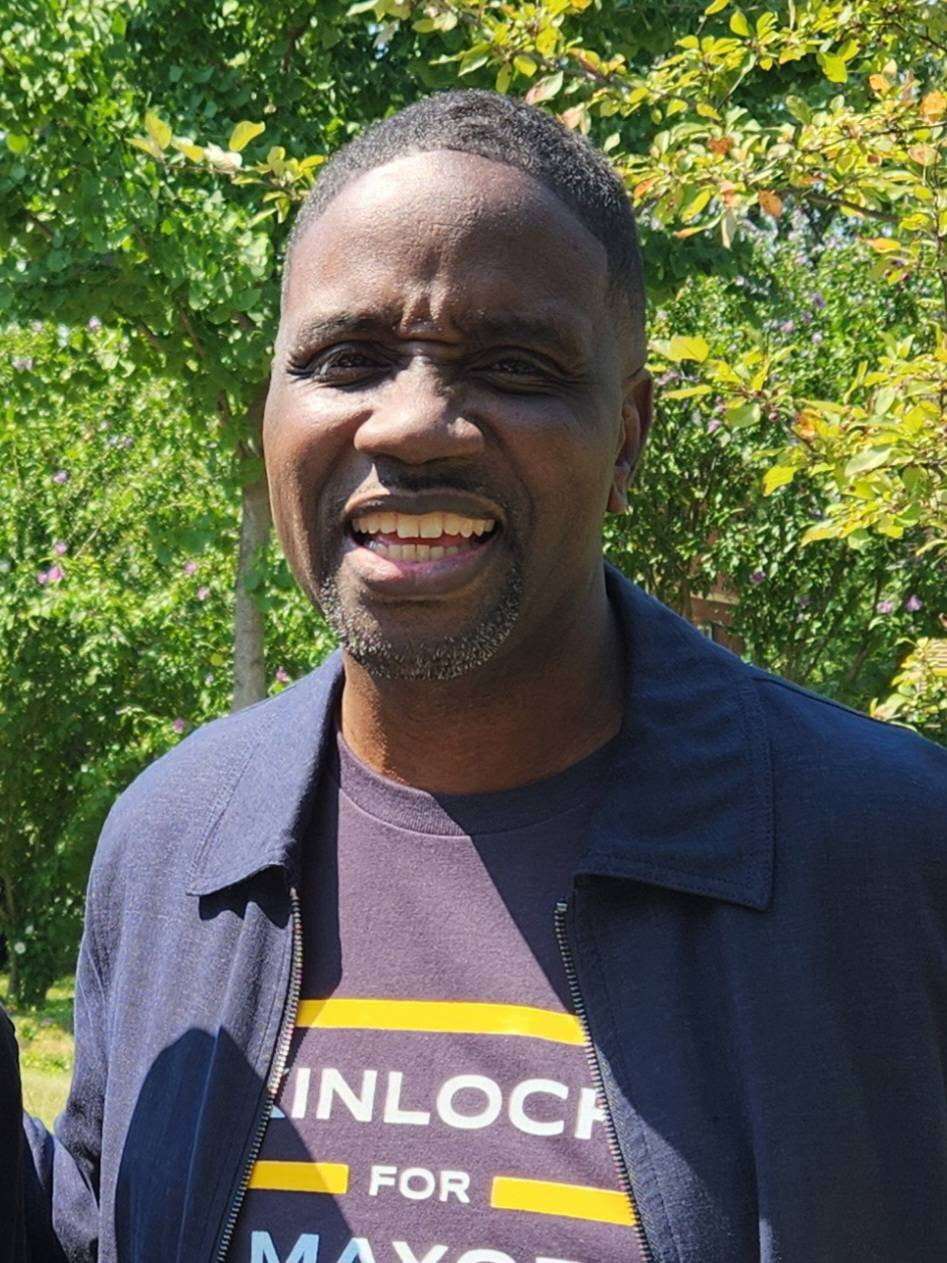
- Kinloch in 2025

Personal details
- Born: July 28, 1973 (age 52) Detroit, Michigan, U.S.
- Party: Democratic
- Education: American Baptist College

Solomon W. Kinloch Jr. (born July 28, 1973) is an American pastor and political candidate. He is the senior pastor of Triumph Church, a non-denominational megachurch based in Detroit. He was a candidate in the 2025 Detroit mayoral election.

== Early life and education ==
Kinloch was born in Detroit, Michigan. He graduated from Northwestern High School in 1991 and later pursued theological studies at American Baptist College.

== Ministry at Triumph Church ==
In 1998, at the age of 24, Kinloch became the senior pastor of Triumph Church, which had a membership of approximately 44 at the time. Under his leadership, the church experienced significant growth, expanding to multiple campuses across the Detroit metropolitan area and reportedly reaching over 40,000 members.

In 2018, Kinloch was named one of the "Michiganians of the Year" by The Detroit News for his leadership and service to the community.

== Political career ==
In February 2025, Kinloch entered electoral politics, announcing a bid for mayor of Detroit in the 2025 election. His campaign kickoff, held at the Fox Theatre on February 19, was reportedly attended by thousands.

His campaign platform included plans to build 10,000 affordable housing units, establish ten new grocery stores to address food deserts, and create a training center for in-demand jobs paying $35 per hour. Kinloch has stated that he intended to continue his pastoral duties if elected mayor.

In May 2025, Kinloch received a significant endorsement from the United Auto Workers (UAW). Kinloch placed second in the August primary election, and advanced to the general election in November, which he lost to Mary Sheffield.

== Other affiliations and recognition ==
Kinloch currently serves on the boards of directors of the Skillman Foundation and the Black Male Educators Alliance of Michigan.

== Personal life ==
Kinloch is married to Robin Kemp Kinloch, and they have one son, Kadin Kinloch.

His brother, Jonathan C. Kinloch, serves as a Wayne County Commissioner, and as chair of the 13th Congressional District Democratic Party, which endorsed Solomon Kinloch.

Kinloch was convicted of assaulting his first wife after a 1993 incident that followed an argument at their Southfield apartment. The Detroit Free Press reported in July 2025 that Kinloch plead guilty to charges of misdemeanor assault and battery the following year. Kinloch reportedly threw a glass at his then-wife before hitting her with the handle of a knife multiple times, causing bleeding, cuts, scratches, and a swollen foot. Kinloch served 18 months of probation and attended counseling. The couple divorced years later. His mayoral campaign issued a statement saying in part that "he has discussed it as part of his ministry and used it to help put countless others on the path to redemption."
