= Melissa Butler =

American entrepreneur

- Born: Detroit, Michigan
- Occupation: Business owner
- Known for: Founder of The Lip Bar cosmetics

Melissa Butler is an American entrepreneur who founded the vegan lipstick brand The Lip Bar. She is known for her 2015 appearance on Shark Tank, where she unsuccessfully pitched her vegan lipstick brand. She later launched and grew the company.

== Early life and education ==
Butler was born and raised in Detroit, Michigan. She attended Cass Technical High School, and completed her bachelor's degree in business finance at Florida A&M University. She then moved to New York to work as an analyst at Barclays.

== Career ==
Working full-time on Wall Street, Butler did not enjoy the job and decided to start a business. She was inspired to create The Lip Bar because she was frustrated by the lack of affordable vegan lipsticks in bright colors. In 2012, she began making and selling vegan lipsticks out of her Brooklyn home and selling them as a side hustle. She made $27,000 in her first year of sales. Two years later, Butler quit her job and moved back to her hometown of Detroit to focus on The Lip Bar full-time. Between 2012 and 2015 the company earned $100,000 in revenue. The brand's lipsticks consist of bright colors and nudes, many with cocktail-themed names. The products are vegan, cruelty-free, and use natural ingredients.

In 2015, Butler appeared on Shark Tank with her friend and creative director Rosco Spears to pitch a mobile version of The Lip Bar. They were rejected by all five judges, and were referred to as "colorful cockroaches". The judges told her they did not see the colorful lipsticks as marketable. Butler stated in an interview with The Detroit News, "Honestly, they were very cruel. But it worked out in the end because we got tons of exposure."

She used LinkedIn to contact potential corporate buyers, and eventually made a connection with a buyer at Target. As of 2018, The Lip Bar is in stock at several hundred Target stores in the United States.
