= Janeé Ayers =

American politician (born 1981)

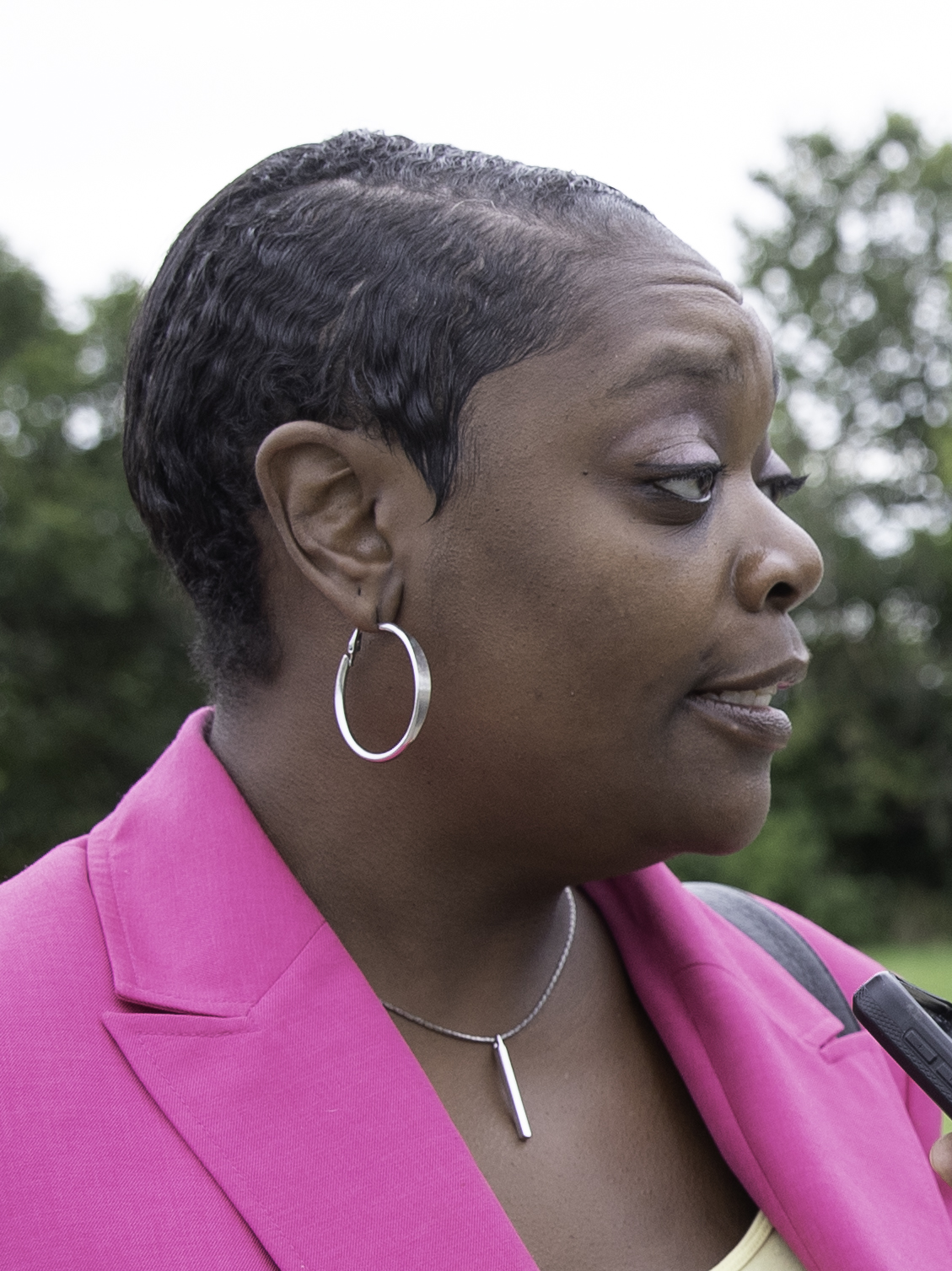
- Ayers in 2019

Member of the Detroit City Council At-Large
- In office February 17, 2015 – January 1, 2022
- Preceded by: Saunteel Jenkins

Personal details
- Born: October 10, 1981 (age 44) Detroit, Michigan, U.S.
- Party: Democratic
- Education: Bowling Green State University
- Profession: Labor union leader
- Website: Council website Campaign website

Janeé L. Ayers (born October 10, 1981) is an American politician and member of the Democratic Party. In 2015, Ayers was appointed to Detroit City Council as an at large member after the resignation of Saunteel Jenkins, and elected for the remainder of the term on November 8, 2016. She was reelected to city council for a full four-year term on November 7, 2017. Ayers was defeated in the November 2021 City Council general election.

== Background ==
Janeé Ayers was born in Detroit, Michigan on October 10, 1981. Her mother Shirlene, is a retired Detroit Public Schools teacher and Detroit American Federation of Teachers (DFT) member. She has four siblings, three of whom are school teachers in the Greater Metro Detroit area.

Ayers grew up in North Rosedale Park on the city's Northwest side and graduated from Renaissance High School. She went on to attend Bowling Green State University and earned her degree in Political Science and Public Policy in 2003.

Before being appointed to city council, Ayers worked for the Detroit Recreation Department and was a high school teacher for Detroit Public Schools, teaching science at Millennium High School until its closing in 2007. While working for the Detroit Recreation Department, she was a member of American Federation of State, County and Municipal Employees (AFSCME). Following her stint with Detroit Public Schools, Ayers began working for MGM Grand Detroit and joined UNITE HERE! Local 24. There she began to focus her attention to the labor community. She was soon elected recording secretary and quickly became the youngest officer on the bargaining team. A few short years later, she was elected vice president of the Metro Detroit AFL-CIO.

== Political career ==
After the resignation of Saunteel Jenkins, Detroit City Council entered a long appointment process to fill the at large seat. Over 135 Detroit residents applied for the position, including former State representatives, a Wayne County Commissioner and multiple former city council candidates. From this pool, Ayers was nominated by Council President Brenda Jones and Council Member Gabe Leland to advance to a round of 17 candidates who were publicly interviewed. At the end of a lengthy voting process, Ayers was appointed to City Council on February 17, 2015, by a supermajority vote of 6–2.

In 2016, Ayers ran for confirmation of her seat in a special election. She won the 2016 August primary and then defeated Daniel A Bullock in the November General Election by a margin of 61%-39%. Her total vote count of 100,385 was the highest total in a Michigan municipal election in the previous ten years.

In 2017, Ayers sought reelection to a full 4 year council term. In the August Primary, she defeated a host of challengers to advance to the general election. That November, Ayers won reelection to her seat by defeating challengers Mary Waters and Beverly Kindle-Walker.

Ayers was defeated in the November 2021 City Council general election.

== Detroit City Council ==
One of Ayers most significant achievements as a Council Member was creating the Returning Citizens Task Force, a program designed to "meet the needs of a large population of Detroit residents who are challenged with successfully reintegrating back into the community from the corrections system. The overarching goal of the task force is to create a community based "one-stop" that will serve as the main resource for returning citizens once they are released."

=== Committee assignments ===
In her first term as Council Member, Ayers served on the following City Council committees:

- Budget, Finance and Audit (Vice-chair)
- Public Health, and Safety (Vice-chair)
- Internal Operations
- Rules

On January 9, 2018, Council Member Ayers was assigned to serve on the following City Council Committees:

- Budget, Finance and Audit (chair)
- Public Health and Safety (Vice-chair)

== Electoral history ==
2016 Primary Election, Detroit City Council At-Large (Non-Partisan)
Party	Candidate	Votes	%
Nonpartisan	Janeé L. Ayers (incumbent)	25,081	47.31
Nonpartisan	David Alexander Bullock	12,135	22.89
Nonpartisan	Eric Williams	9,085	17.14
Nonpartisan	John W. Cromer	3,556	6.71
Nonpartisan	Sigmunt John Szczepkowski, Jr.	2,876	5.42
Nonpartisan	Write-In	282	0.53
Total votes		53,015	100

2016 General Election, Detroit City Council At-Large (Non-Partisan)
Party	Candidate	Votes	%
Nonpartisan	Janeé L. Ayers (incumbent)	100,635	60.58
Nonpartisan	David Alexander Bullock	63,270	38.09
Nonpartisan	Write-In	2,207	1.33
Total votes		166,112	100

2017 Primary Election, Detroit City Council At-Large (Non-Partisan)
Party	Candidate	Votes	%
Nonpartisan	Brenda Jones (incumbent)	46,110	45.05
Nonpartisan	Janeé L. Ayers (incumbent)	25,742	25.15
Nonpartisan	Mary Waters	17,190	16.79
Nonpartisan	Beverly Kindle-Walker	6,587	6.44
Nonpartisan	Alisa McKinney	6,185	6.04
Nonpartisan	Write-In	545	0.53
Total votes		102,359	100

2017 General Election, Detroit City Council At-Large (Non-Partisan)
Party	Candidate	Votes	%
Nonpartisan	Brenda Jones (incumbent)	71,306	42.57
Nonpartisan	Janeé L. Ayers (incumbent)	48,103	28.72
Nonpartisan	Mary Waters	32,717	19.53
Nonpartisan	Beverly Kindle-Walker	14,522	8.67
Nonpartisan	Write-In	859	0.51
Total votes		167,507	100

2021 Primary Election, Detroit City Council At-Large (Non-Partisan)
Party	Candidate	Votes	%
Nonpartisan	Janeé L. Ayers (incumbent)	34,514	30.86
Nonpartisan	Coleman A. Young, Jr.	34,159	30.54
Nonpartisan	Mary Waters	26,028	23.27
Nonpartisan	Nicole Small	11,990	10.72
Nonpartisan	Jermain Lee Jones	4,647	4.15
Nonpartisan	Write-In	515	0.46
Total votes		111,853	100

2021 General Election, Detroit City Council At-Large (Non-Partisan)
Party	Candidate	Votes	%
Nonpartisan	Coleman A. Young, Jr.	48,380	31.26
Nonpartisan	Mary Waters	41,678	26.93
Nonpartisan	Janeé L. Ayers (incumbent)	39,001	25.20
Nonpartisan	Nicole Small	25,306	16.35
Nonpartisan	Write-In	402	0.26
Total votes		154,767	100

== Awards and other honors ==
- 2016 Michigan Chronicle Woman of Excellence

- 2017 Michigan Democratic Party Martin Luther King Jr. Award
