= Kandia Milton =

American politician

Kandia Milton (born July 24, 1971) is a Detroit politician, who served briefly as acting mayor of Detroit. He served previously as the mayor's chief of staff. In December 2009 he pled guilty to taking bribes and in August 2010 he was sentenced to 14 months in prison.

== Life and career ==
He was born in Detroit on July 24, 1971. His mother was Tene-Sandra Ramsey, who was also working for the city as Director Senior Citizens Commission. He attended University Liggett School in Grosse Pointe Woods, Michigan, graduating in 1990, and Niagara University in New York where he graduated in 1994 with a Bachelor's degree in Communications. He also served as captain of men's basketball team and later as assistant coach from 1997 to 1999.

He then served in the administration of mayor Kwame Kilpatrick from 2002, where he served as liaison to the city council and as deputy chief of staff, before being appointed chief of staff January 29, 2008 after former chief of staff Christine Beatty resigned after being indicted for perjury alongside Kilpatrick, who despite requests to resign from all directions has refused to leave his post.

He was acting mayor on August 8, 2008 while Kilpatrick himself was incarcerated in Wayne County jail in relation to bond violations.

On December 11, 2009, Milton pleaded guilty to bribery charges punishable by up to 3 years in prison.

== Controversies ==
Delinquent 2005-2006 property taxes (since paid $9,418 to Wayne County Treasurer's office), Chapter 13 Bankruptcy owing $389,207 to a variety of creditors, including mortgages, credit cards, taxes and utility bills. In 2005 and 2006 the sheriff's office seized two of Milton's properties and sold these at auction. At one point, Milton had amassed $1,080 in parking ticket fines owed to the city. In April 2006, he was cited by Detroit police for failing to properly secure a child passenger. He paid a $235 fine, according to 36th District Court records.
