= JoAnn Watson =

American pastor and politician (1951–2023)

Honorable JoAnn Watson
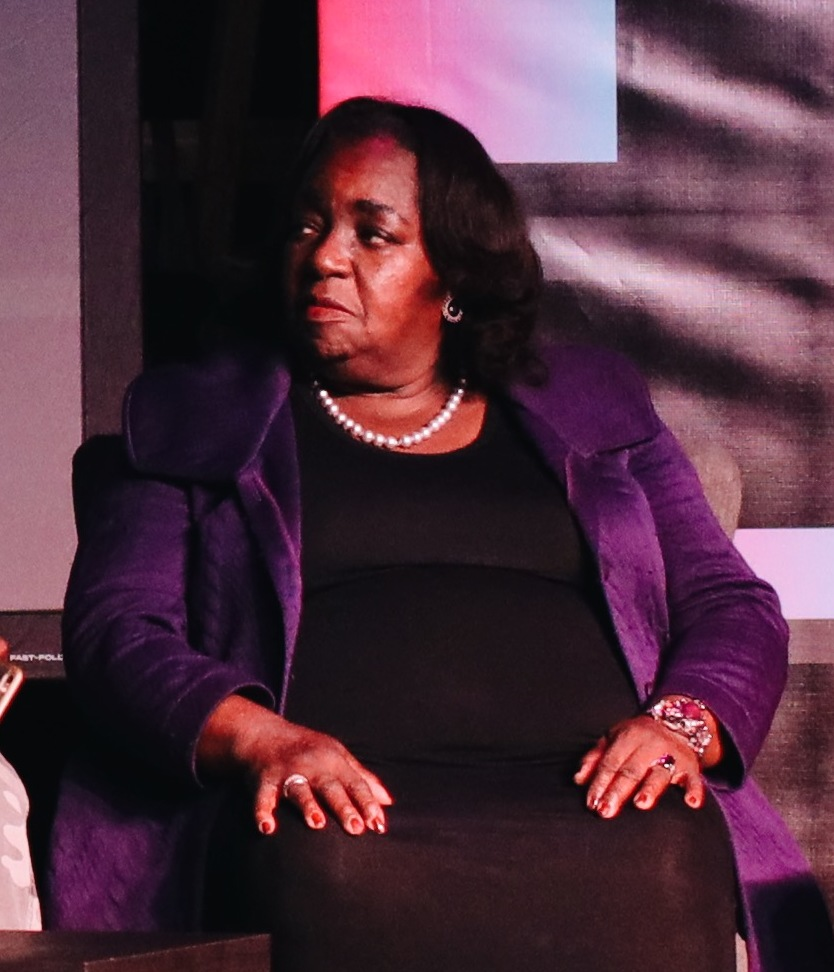
- Watson in 2019

Member of the Detroit City Council from the at-large district
- In office 2003–2013
- Preceded by: Brenda Scott
- Succeeded by: Raquel Castañeda-López

Personal details
- Born: April 19, 1951 Detroit, Michigan, U.S.
- Died: July 10, 2023 (aged 72)
- Party: Democratic
- Children: Damon, Nefertari, Stephen B., Maya
- Parent(s): Jefferson Nichols, Sr. and Rev. Lestine Kent Nichols
- Education: University of Michigan
- Occupation: Civil rights/social justice activist; Radio & TV talk show host; Minister; Professor

JoAnn Watson (April 19, 1951 – July 10, 2023) was an American pastor, media personality and was a Detroit city councilor for ten years. She was an on-air personality for 910 AM Superstation/WFDF and Comcast Channel 91 WHPR

Watson was an associate professor at Wayne County Community College. Watson also served as the Associate Pastor of West Side Unity Church and was a faculty member at the Unity Urban Ministerial School.

== Early life and education ==
JoAnn Watson was born on April 19, 1951 and raised in Detroit, Michigan. She was the daughter of Jefferson Nichols Sr. and Rev. Lestine Kent Nichols.

After graduating from Detroit Central High School in 1968, Watson attended the University of Michigan, where she earned her Bachelor of Arts degree in Journalism and was later recognized as a "Distinguished Alumnus" and, in 1996, given the "Leonard F. Sain Esteemed Alumni Award". Watson also was awarded an honorary Doctorate in Humanities.

== Community activism ==
Watson began her career in public service as the executive director of the Downtown Detroit YWCA. She would eventually rise to the position of assistant executive director of the National YWCA. From 1987 to 1990, she worked the New York headquarters and directed their Office of Racial Justice. She later worked the executive director of the Detroit NAACP.

In 1989, Watson was selected as a delegate to the Women for Meaningful Summits/USA, which was held in the Union of Soviet Socialist Republics.

In 2001, Watson was selected to serve as a delegate to the UN World Conference Against Racism.

In 2016, Watson was chosen by American Girl as one of a six-member boardto advise them on the creation of Melody—a doll that depicts a 9-year old African American girl living in Detroit during the Civil Rights Movement.

Watson was the founding President of the National Association of Black Talk Show Hosts; was a consultant to Pathways to College; was a member of the Detroit Council of Elders; was a member of the National Black Council of Elders. and served as President of the National Anti-Klan Network and as President of the Center for Democratic Renewal.

== Published writings ==
Watson was a contributing author to "Should America Pay?", Dr. Raymond Winbush's 2003 publication on reparations, and wrote the foreword to Herb Boyd's 2017 book, Black Detroit: A People's History of Self Determination.

== Political career ==
Prior to her service as a member of the city council, Watson served as public liaison for Congressman John Conyers.

In 2003, Watson filed to run in a Special Election called to fill a vacancy on the Detroit City Council, which was created when Councilwoman Brenda Scott died on September 2, 2002. On April 29, 2003, Watson won the Special Election 52% to 48%, defeating Gil Hill.

Watson would subsequently win re-election to City Council and served as City Council President Pro Tem.

During Watson's tenure on City Council, her staff included future Michigan State Legislator Coleman Young II, who interned in her office.

In 2013, Watson announced her intention to retire. In December of that year, a celebration of her career was held at the Charles H. Wright Museum of African American History, where Dick Gregory again was the headliner.

== Death ==
Watson died on July 10, 2023, at the age of 72.
