= Kwame Kenyatta =

American politician (1956–2019)

Kwame Kenyatta (March 15, 1956 – May 22, 2019) was an American politician.

Kenyatta was an African-American who lived in Detroit, Michigan. He served on the Wayne County Commission and the Detroit Board of Education. Kenyatta also served on the Detroit City Council from 2006 to 2013.

Kwame Kenyatta's name included components from the names of two well-known Black African revolutionaries - Kwame Nkruma (Ghana) and Jomo Kenyatta (Kenya).
