= Maryann Mahaffey =

American politician

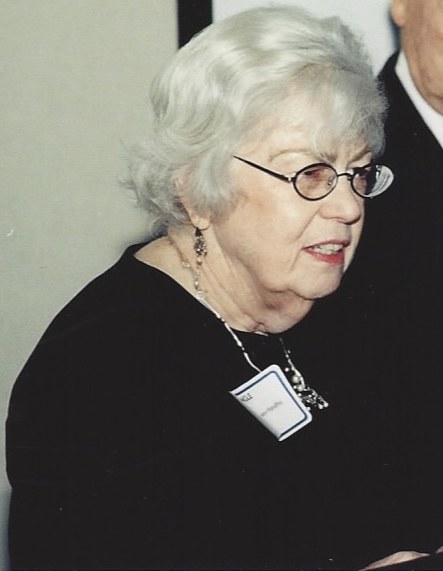
- Mahaffey in 2002

Member of the Detroit City Council
- In office 1973–2005

Personal details
- Born: January 18, 1925 Burlington, Iowa
- Died: July 27, 2006 (aged 81) Detroit, Michigan
- Party: Democratic
- Spouse: Hy Dooha
- Education: Cornell College, University of Southern California
- Profession: Education, Politician

Maryann Mahaffey (January 18, 1925 – July 27, 2006) was an American politician and activist.

== Early life and education ==
Mahaffey was born in Burlington, Iowa. Mahaffey attended, and graduated from Cornell College in 1946.

== Activism ==
While in college, during the summer of 1945, Mahaffey worked at Poston Internment Camp as a Recreation Director. In this work, she became aware that the internment camp's real purpose was to hold American citizens because of their ethnicity and not because of any crimes they had committed. Influenced by her early work experiences, Mahaffey decided to attend the University of Southern California to obtain a master's degree in Social Work.

She successfully ran for election in 1973 for Detroit City Council. Mahaffey was one of a few members of the Democratic Socialists of America to be elected to public office. She served on the Detroit City Council from 1973 until 2005, from 1990 to 1998 and from 2001 to 2005 as council president.

She filed a lawsuit that allowed women to run for office under their birth name, instead of their husband's surname. She led efforts to open the Detroit Athletic Club to women and helped enact an ordinance prohibiting sexual harassment of city employees. She successfully opposed the closing of the city's main hospital for the uninsured and oversaw redevelopment of several inner city neighborhoods, and championed construction along the Woodward Corridor.

Mahaffey was active in many organizations related to nutrition, women in politics, peace, and ending discrimination.

== Personal life ==
While a student in the School of Social Work, she met Herman (Hy) Dooha, whom she married in June 1950. After Mahaffey and Dooha graduated in 1951, they moved to Indianapolis where Mahaffey began work with Girl Scouts of the United States of America.

She died on July 27, 2006, from health complications related to leukemia, aged 81.
