= Nick Rathod =

American businessman

Nicholas Rathod is the founder and former executive director of the State Innovation Exchange, which was created and designed to build progressive power in state legislatures around the country, growing it from an idea to a multimillion dollar organization with more than 30 staff in 3 years. Prior to leading this organization, Rathod served as the director of state campaigns for Mayor Bloomberg’s Everytown for Gun Safety, where he oversaw legislative campaigns around gun control. Rathod also worked with Senator Elizabeth Warren to help build and establish the Consumer Financial Protection Bureau (CFPB) and later served as the Bureau’s Assistant Director, in charge of Intergovernmental and International Affairs.

Rathod was U.S. President Barack Obama's Special Assistant and Deputy Director for Intergovernmental Affairs in the Office of the President, serving as President Obama’s liaison to states and U.S. territories handling political and policy engagement as it relates to the states for the President.

Immediately prior to his White House appointment, Rathod served as Director for Intergovernmental Affairs for the Obama/Biden Transition team. As such, he represented, and spoke on behalf of the President-elect, at the inauguration of Governor of Puerto Rico Luis Fortuño, who although a Republican, heads a bipartisan administration that includes two notable Democrats, Resident Commissioner Pedro Pierluisi and Kenneth McClintock, who was appointed by Fortuño as Secretary of State, and first in the line of succession.

A Virginia-based community organizer, he has been active in co-founding two organizations, South Asian Americans Leading Together (SAALT), and, during the 2008 presidential campaign, South Asians for Obama (SAFO). He has also served as the Political Director for former New York Governor Eliot Spitzer and as Senior Manager of State and Regional Relations at the Center for American Progress, founded by President Bill Clinton's Chief of Staff, John Podesta.

Subsequently, Rathod was active in Virginia helping to build and grow the state's first donor table, assisting in organizing and other support for low income Virginians through his work on the board of directors of the Virginia Poverty Law Center and is an advisor to a number of statewide and local elected officials across the Commonwealth.

As of 15 November 2021, Rathod is the campaign manager for Beto O'Rourke's campaign in the 2022 Texas gubernatorial race.
