= Horace Sheffield III =

American pastor and activist

Reverend Horace Sheffield III

Personal details
- Born: December 28, 1954 (age 71) Detroit, Michigan
- Party: Democratic
- Children: Horace Sheffield IV; Mary Sheffield
- Parent(s): Rev. Horace Sheffield, Jr. & Mary Coty
- Education: Wayne State University; University of Michigan
- Occupation: Baptist minister civil rights/social justice activist Radio & TV talk show host

Horace Sheffield III (born December 28, 1954) is an American Christian minister and media personality who serves as pastor of New Destiny Christian Fellowship in Michigan. As of 2018, he served as the co-chair of the Michigan Democratic Party Community Democratic Caucus.

== Personal life ==
Sheffield was born in Detroit, Michigan. He is the son of Mary (née Otto), and Rev. Horace Sheffield Jr., a supervisor at Ford Motor Company. The elder Sheffield fought to create the UAW's Inter-Racial Committee.

Sheffield is the father of Detroit mayor Mary Sheffield.

== Education ==
After graduating Cass Tech High School, Sheffield attended Wayne State University, where he received his B.A. in History & English In 1995, Sheffield earned a master's degree in Public Administration from the University of Michigan Dearborn. In 2000, the University of Michigan awarded Sheffield its "African American Alumni Affiliate Alumnus of the Year" award. In 2016, the University of Michigan awarded Sheffield its "Making A Difference (M.A.D.)" Award.

== Community activism ==
Sheffield is the CEO of the Detroit Association of Black Organizations, Chairman of the Detroit Ecumenical Ministers Alliance and Founder/Former President of both the Detroit and Michigan Chapters of the National Action Network. He is also the pastor of the New Destiny Christian Fellowship.

Sheffield also founded the Detroit Cares Alternative Academy.

In 2003, Sheffield co-wrote a letter with Al Sharpton to American Honda, complaining that the company did not hire enough African-Americans in management. "We support those that support us," the letter said. "We cannot be silent while African-Americans spend hard-earned dollars with a company that does not hire, promote or do business with us in a statistically significant manner."

In 2009, Sheffield led the National Black Leadership Commission, a conference by African-American clergy about the spread of HIV/AIDS.

Sheffield served as a member of the organizing committee for the 2009 NCAA Final Four, that was hosted at Ford Field in Detroit.

In 2016, Sheffield started the "Bust the Ball" campaign, which held protests August 17 in Detroit, and on August 29 in New York over his concerns that the NBA was engaging in "Green-lining", or being exclusionary of non-white agents and staff.

On Christmas morning 2016, a man left a message on a New Destiny Christian Fellowship prayer hotline, using racial slurs and threatening to firebomb Sheffield's church.

== Political career ==
In 1979, Sheffield was a founding co-chair of The Commission for the Advancement of Policy Affecting Youth, the Disadvantaged and the Poor.

In 2014, Sheffield was called by a federal grand jury to talk about what he knew regarding efforts to influence the selection of Detroit City Council leaders. The FBI was investigating rumors that Thomas Hardiman, President and CEO of A&H Contractors, was reportedly trying to bribe Detroit City Council members, in an attempt to influence the outcome of the vote for Council President. Sheffield said he was angry because Hardiman approached his daughter, Councilwoman Mary Sheffield, about the vote.

=== 2014 13th Congressional District Primary Election ===
In April 2014, Sheffield filed to run in the Democratic Primary Election for Michigan's 13th Congressional District, against incumbent John Conyers. During the election, Sheffield challenged the signatures Conyers had gathered after it was discovered that the signature collectors were not registered to vote in the district. Wayne County Clerk Cathy Garrett ruled that the signatures were invalid, which would have made Conyers ineligible. Conyers and the ACLU filed a successful lawsuit claiming that the law was unconstitutional, and Conyers was allowed to run. On August 5, 2014, John Conyers won the primary election, receiving 86% of the vote.

=== Electoral history ===
2014 Michigan 1st House District Primary Election
Party	Candidate	Votes	%
Democratic	John Conyers	42,005	86.3
Democratic	Horace Sheffield III	6,696	13.7
