= Joshua D. Rogers =

American businessman, author, film producer and actor

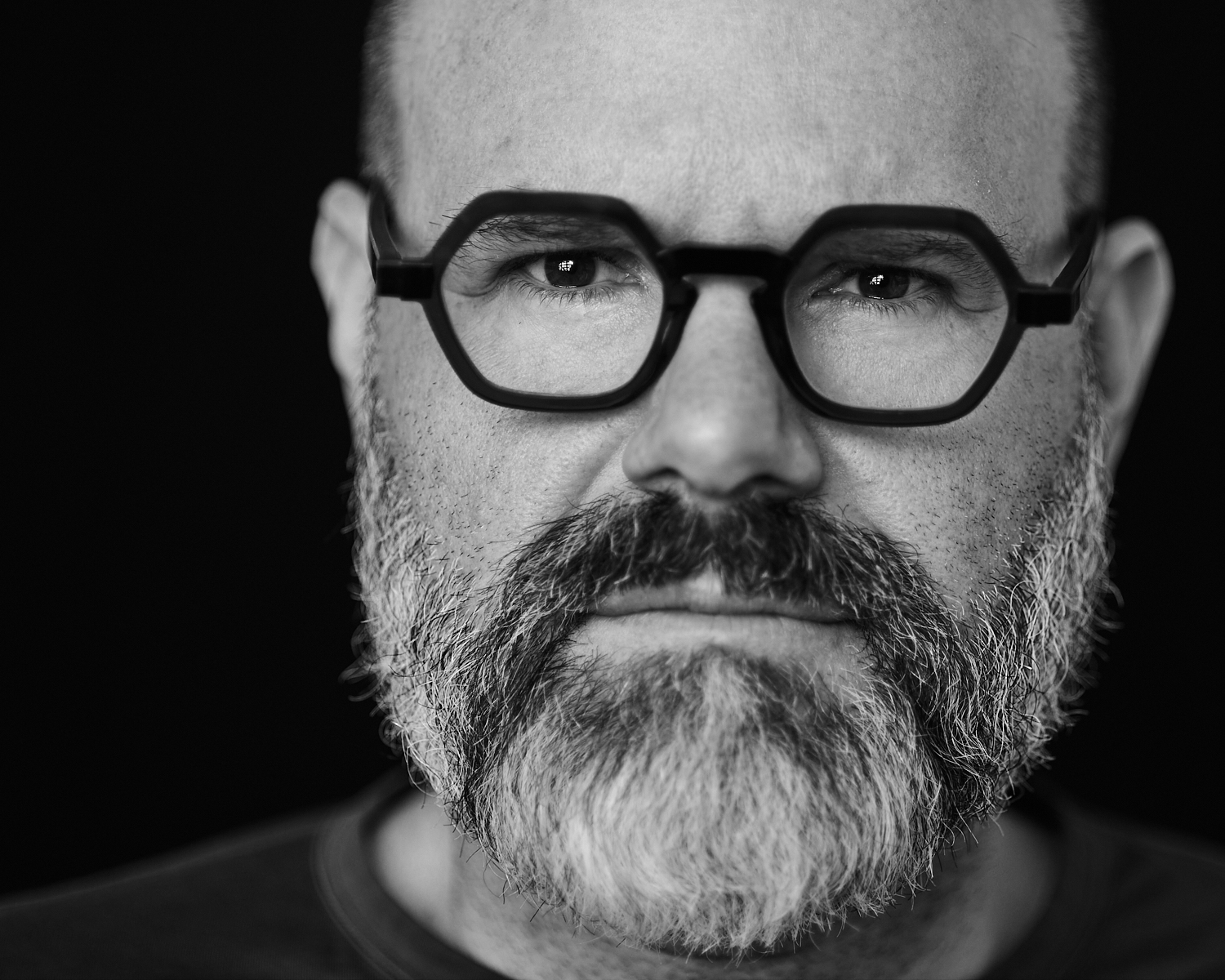
- Born: Joshua Dean Rogers; March 31, 1975 (age 51); Washington, D.C., United States
- Education: St. John’s College; Johns Hopkins University
- Occupations: Businessman, Author, Film producer, Actor

Joshua Dean Rogers is an American businessman, author, film producer, and actor. He is the founder and CEO of the financial services company Arete Wealth. Rogers is also known for being the author of the poetry collection Psychedelic Psalms: Reflections from an Offline World. He also starred in and served as the executive producer for the film An Autumn Summer.

== Early life and education ==
Joshua Rogers was born to U.S. Navy Captain Paul Rogers and Marilyn Rogers. He initially enrolled at Johns Hopkins University to pursue a biomedical engineering degree, but eventually transferred to St. John's College, where he graduated with a double major in philosophy and mathematics and a triple minor in classical languages, literature, and history of science.

== Career ==
Rogers initially pursued a career as a professor of philosophy at Georgetown Law School before leaving to join the e-commerce company Walker Digital, where he served as co-inventor of 16 different patents, including Spare Change, a name-your-own-price reverse auction system that eventually became the basis for Priceline.com.

Rogers also spent some time as a stock broker, working at Prime Charter Ltd., and a financial advisor, working at American Express Financial Advisors (eventually known as Ameriprise).

Rogers founded Arete Wealth, an investment advisory, broker-dealer, and insurance firm in 2007.

Rogers contributed to the 2020 book How I Invest My Money: Financial Experts Reveal How They Save, Spend, and Invest.

In 2024, the executive produced and acted in the independent drama An Autumn Summer, which premiered at the Lake Michigan Film Festival.

In 2025, Rogers published the poetry book Psychedelic Psalms: Reflections from an Offline World.

As of 2025, Rogers currently serves on the boards of the Museum of Contemporary Art in Chicago, and St. John's College.

In 2026, Arete Wealth was included in Crain's Chicago Business's list of the largest wealth managers in the Chicago area.

In 2026, the romance film An Autumn Summer was acquired for distribution by Blue Harbor Entertainment, as reported by Deadline Hollywood.

The film An Autumn Summer was also covered in media previews ahead of its release, including trailer coverage by FirstShowing.net.

== Personal life ==
Rogers is an avid art collector whose collection has been featured in publications such as Chicago Business, Whitewall, Timeout, and Cultured Mag. He is married to Megan Green Rogers.

In 2026, activity involving Expo Chicago was reported by ARTnews during its VIP preview, highlighting market transactions and collector participation.

== Bibliography ==
- Rogers, J.D. (2025). Psychedelic Psalms: Reflections from an Offline World. Hat & Beard Press.

== Filmography ==
Year	Title	Notes	Role	Ref.
2024	An Autumn Summer	Independent film	Executive producer, actor	
