= Sanjay Gupta =

American neurosurgeon and writer (born 1969)

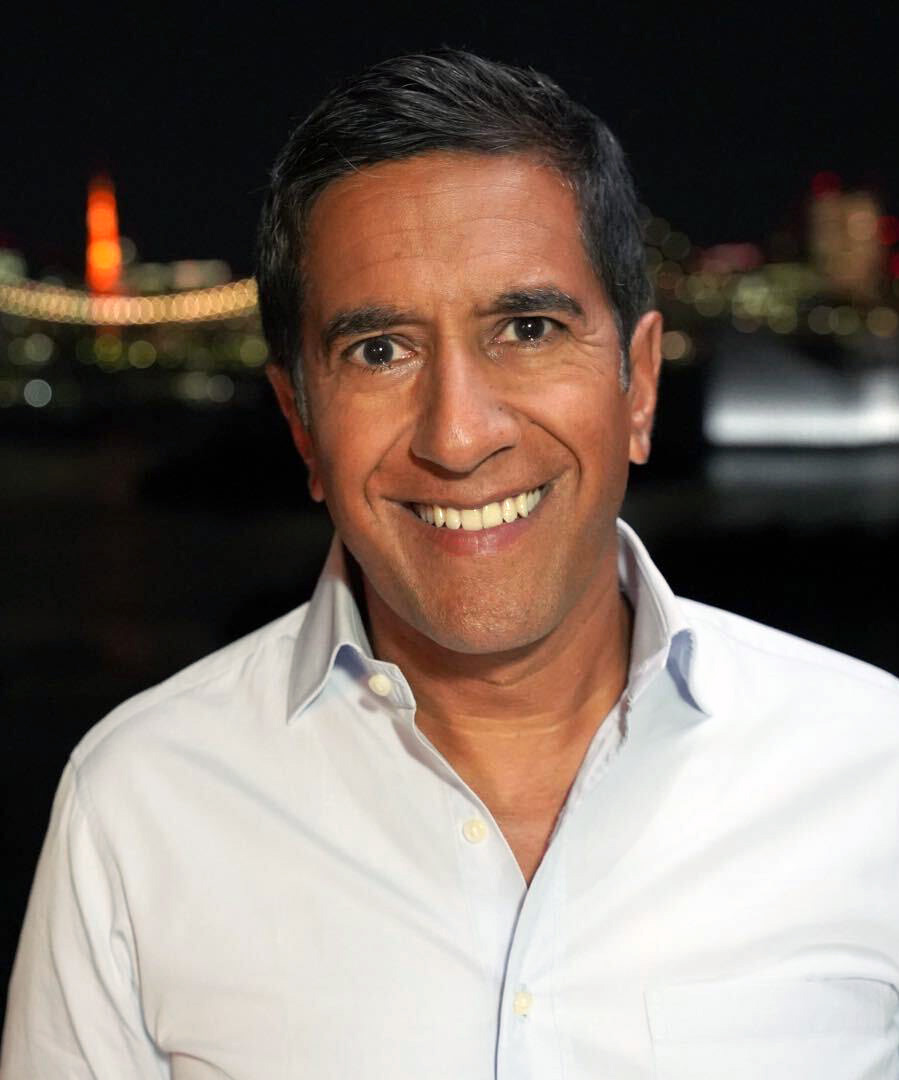
- Gupta in 2021
- Born: October 23, 1969 (age 57); Novi, Michigan, U.S.
- Education: University of Michigan (BS, MD)
- Occupations: Neurosurgeon; medical reporter; writer; producer
- Spouse: Rebecca Olson (m. 2004)
- Children: 3
- Mother: Damyanti Gupta
- Family: Suneel Gupta (brother)

Sanjay Gupta (born October 23, 1969) is an American neurosurgeon, medical reporter, and writer. He serves as an associate chief of the neurosurgery service at Grady Memorial Hospital in Atlanta, Georgia, an associate professor of neurosurgery at the Emory University School of Medicine, a member of the National Academy of Medicine, a member of the American Academy of Arts and Sciences, and the chief medical correspondent for CNN.

Gupta is known for his many television appearances on health-related issues. During the COVID-19 pandemic, he was a frequent contributor to numerous CNN shows covering the crisis and hosted a weekly town hall with Anderson Cooper. Gupta was the host of the CNN show Sanjay Gupta MD for which he has won multiple Emmy Awards. Gupta also hosted the 6-part miniseries Chasing Life. He is a frequent contributor to other CNN programs such as American Morning, Larry King Live, CNN Tonight, and Anderson Cooper 360°. His reports from Charity Hospital, New Orleans, Louisiana, in the wake of Hurricane Katrina led to his winning a 2006 Emmy Award for Outstanding Feature Story in a Regularly Scheduled Newscast. He is also a special correspondent for CBS News.

Sanjay Gupta also co-hosts the health conference "Life Itself", along with Marc Hodosh (co-creator of TEDMED). Gupta published a column in Time magazine and has written five books: Chasing Life, Cheating Death, Monday Mornings: A Novel, Keep Sharp and It Doesn't Have to Hurt: Your Smart Guide to a Pain-Free Life (2025). All were #1 New York Times bestsellers.

== Early life and education ==
Gupta was born in Novi, Michigan, a suburb of Detroit. In the 1960s, Gupta's parents, Subhash and Damyanti Gupta (née Hingorani), both moved from India prior to their marriage and met in Livonia, Michigan, where they worked as engineers for Ford Motor Company. His mother was born in the village of Tharushah in Sindh (now Pakistan), but at age 5 fled to Baroda, India, as a Hindu refugee during the Partition of India. Gupta and his younger brother Suneel graduated from Novi High School; Gupta went on to receive his Bachelor of Science degree in biomedical sciences at the University of Michigan in Ann Arbor, and his M.D. degree from the University of Michigan Medical School in 1993. He was part of Inteflex, a since-discontinued accelerated medical education program that accepted medical students directly from high school.

As an undergraduate, Gupta worked as an orientation leader for the first-year orientation program and was a member of the Men's Glee Club. He also served as president of the Indian American Students Association (IASA), one of the university's larger student organization. Gupta completed his residency in neurological surgery within the University of Michigan Health System in 2000, followed by a fellowship at the Semmes Murphy Clinic, in Memphis, Tennessee. Gupta plays the accordion, having taken ten years of lessons, as he noted in an interview with David Hochman for Playboy.

Gupta was a White House Fellow in 1997–1998.

== Career ==
=== Medical practice ===
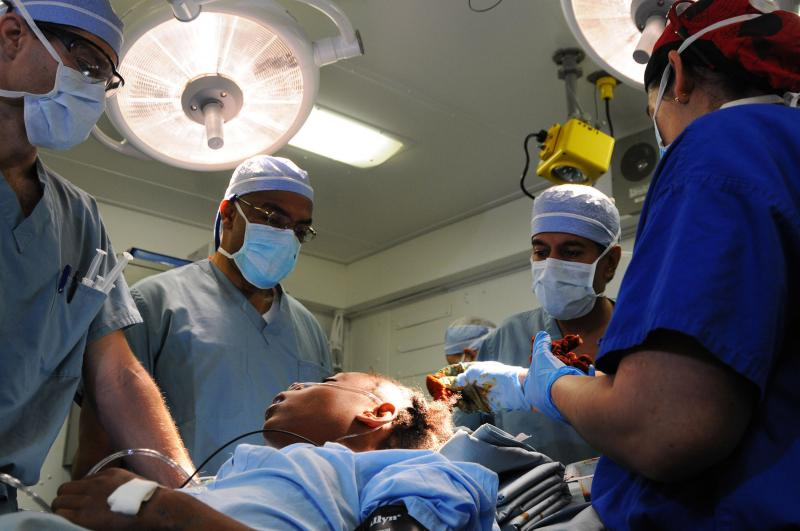
Gupta (third from left) with Henri Ford (second from left) and two U.S. Navy doctors operating on a 12-year-old girl aboard the USS Carl Vinson

Gupta is an Emory Healthcare general neurosurgeon at Grady Memorial Hospital and has worked on spine, trauma, and 3‑D‑image-guided operations. He has published medical journal articles on percutaneous pedicle screw placement, brain tumors, and spinal cord abnormalities. He is licensed to practice medicine in Georgia. From 1997 to 1998, he served as one of fifteen White House Fellows, primarily as an advisor to Hillary Clinton. In January 2009, it was reported that Gupta was offered the position of Surgeon General of the United States in the Obama Administration, but he withdrew his name from consideration.

During his reporting in Haiti following the January 2010 earthquake, Gupta received a call from the aircraft carrier USS Carl Vinson that an earthquake victim, a 12-year-old girl, was aboard and needed a neurosurgeon. Gupta, a pediatric surgeon, Henri Ford, and two U.S. Navy doctors removed a piece of concrete from the girl's skull in an operation performed aboard the Vinson. Ford later wrote that Gupta "proved to be a competent neurosurgeon".

=== Broadcast journalism, television, film and events ===
Gupta joined CNN in the summer of 2001. He reported from New York following the attacks on the U.S. on September 11, 2001. In 2003, Gupta traveled to Iraq to cover the medical aspects of the invasion of Iraq. While in Iraq, Gupta performed emergency surgery on both US soldiers and Iraqi civilians. Gupta was embedded with a Navy medical unit at the time, specifically a group of Corpsman called the "Devil Docs", who supported the 1st Marine Expeditionary Force. Marine Sergeant Jesus Vindaña suffered a rear gunshot wound, and the Marines asked for Gupta's assistance because of his background in neurosurgery. Vindaña survived and was sent back to the United States for rehabilitation. In December 2006, CBS News president Sean McManus negotiated a deal with CNN that would have Gupta file up to ten reports a year for the CBS Evening News with Katie Couric and 60 Minutes while remaining CNN's chief medical correspondent and associate chief of neurosurgery at Grady Memorial Hospital.

On October 14, 2007, Gupta guest-hosted a health episode of CBS News Sunday Morning as its regular host Charles Osgood was on vacation. In February 2009, Gupta hosted AC360 covering the White House Health Summit. He also guest-hosted Larry King Live in October 2009. In January 2010, Gupta and Cooper led CNN's coverage of the earthquake in Haiti. Gupta has regularly appeared on the Late Show with David Letterman, The Late Late Show with Craig Ferguson, The Daily Show with Jon Stewart, Real Time with Bill Maher and the Oprah Winfrey Show. Winfrey referred to Gupta as CNN's hero in January 2010.

In 2011, Gupta portrayed himself in the movie Contagion, which has received much renewed attention during the 2020 coronavirus pandemic. His novel Monday Mornings became an instant New York Times bestseller on its release in March 2012. It was adapted as a 2013 television series with David E. Kelley and Gupta serving as executive producers. In a 2013 editorial, Gupta announced that in the process of working on a documentary about marijuana, he had changed his mind about the drug's risks and benefits. Gupta had previously criticized laws that allowed patient access to medical marijuana, but he reversed his stance, saying, "I am here to apologize," and, "We have been terribly and systematically misled for nearly 70 years in the United States, and I apologize for my own role in that." The third part of his 3-hour documentary, "Weed 3: The Marijuana Revolution", was released in April 2015. He was a co-producer of the 2017 CNN documentary Unseen Enemy, which warned of the risks of a global pandemic.

Gupta served as a commentator on the University of Michigan TeamCast with former Wolverines kicker Jay Feely for the school's appearance in the 2018 NCAA Men's Final Four, which aired on CNN sibling TNT. In April 2019, Chasing Life was adapted as a six-show TV miniseries on CNN that took him to Japan, India, Bolivia, Norway, Italy, and Turkey. In September 2019, Gupta and Marc Hodosh (Co-Creator of TEDMED) announced a new event called Life Itself in partnership with CNN. Both Gupta and Hodosh will serve as hosts and organizers. From June 28 to July 9, 2021, Gupta served as a guest host on Jeopardy!.

=== Surgeon General candidate ===
On January 6, 2009, CNN announced that Gupta had been considered for the position of Surgeon General by President-elect Barack Obama. Some doctors said his communication skills and high-profile would allow him to highlight medical issues and prioritize medical reform. John Conyers, Jr. (D-MI), wrote a letter opposing Gupta's nomination. Conyers supported a single-payer health care system; Gupta has criticized Michael Moore and his film Sicko.

From the medical community, Donna Wright, of Creative Health Care Management, a regular commentator on medicine and politics, also defended the appointment on the grounds of his media presence, combined with his medical qualifications, which she viewed as an ideal combination for the post of surgeon general. Likewise, Fred Sanfilippo, executive vice president for health affairs at Emory University, supported Gupta's nomination by issuing a press release saying: "He has the character, training, intelligence and communications skills needed to help the United States improve its health and health care delivery systems in the next Administration." The American Council on Exercise, listed by PR Newswire as "America's leading authority on fitness and one of the largest fitness certification, education and training organizations in the world", endorsed the nomination of Gupta "because of his passion for inspiring Americans to lead healthier, more active lives". The ACE sent a letter of support to senator Edward M. Kennedy. Former surgeon general Joycelyn Elders also supported Gupta's nomination, saying: "He has enough well-trained, well-qualified public health people to teach him the things he needs to do the job." In March 2009 Gupta withdrew his name from consideration for the post, citing his family and his career.

== Criticisms ==
Some journalists and journalism professors specializing in health care have criticized the quality of Gupta's coverage. Trudy Lieberman, a regular Nation contributor on healthcare and director of the health and medicine reporting program at the CUNY Graduate School of Journalism, reviewed Gupta's "ineptitude" in reporting on the McCain health plan. Lieberman criticized Gupta for relying on insurance industry statistics, and a health expert quoted by Lieberman said that Gupta's reporting "gives a gross oversimplification". Gary Schwitzer, professor of health journalism at the University of Minnesota School of Journalism and now an editor at Health News Review, has also criticized Gupta's reporting.

=== Michael Moore dispute ===
A July 9, 2007, broadcast of CNN's The Situation Room aired a fact-check segment by Gupta on Michael Moore's 2007 film Sicko in which Gupta stated that Moore had "fudged facts". Immediately following the segment, Moore was interviewed live on CNN by Wolf Blitzer. Moore said that Gupta's report was inaccurate and biased, and Moore later posted a detailed response on his website. Moore accused CNN of being biased in favor of the drug industry because most of the sponsors for their medical coverage were drug companies.

On July 10, 2007, Gupta debated Moore on Larry King Live; on July 15, CNN released a statement in response to Michael Moore's rebuttal. In it, they apologized for an error in their on-air report, having stated that in the film Moore reported Cuba spends $25 per person for health care when the film actually gave that number as $251. CNN attributed this to a transcription error. CNN defended the rest of Gupta's report, responding point-by-point to Moore's response, contending that the comparison of data from different sources in different years was in effect cherry picking results, at the cost of statistical accuracy.

== Honors ==
On April 28, 2012, Gupta was awarded an honorary Doctor of Humane Letters degree for his accomplishments in the medical field. He also gave the commencement address at the spring commencement ceremony held in the University of Michigan Stadium. On March 20, 2015, Gupta along with his wife, Rebecca, received the 2015 UNICEF Global Philanthropist Award. On June 12, 2016, Gupta addressed the Oregon Health & Science University graduating class of 2016. On May 23, 2019, Gupta presented the commencement address to the Albert Einstein College of Medicine class of 2019. In October 2019, Gupta was elected to the National Academy of Medicine, to join its 2019 class consisting of 100 members, one of the highest honors in medicine. Gupta was elected as a member of the American Academy of Arts and Sciences in 2021. On October 6, 2022, Gupta was honored with the Fitzwater Medallion for Leadership in Public Communication by Franklin Pierce University. On May 22, 2023, Gupta delivered Baylor College of Medicine's commencement address and was awarded the honorary Doctor of Letters in Medicine degree. On May 25, 2023, Gupta was the featured keynote speaker at the Harvard Medical School and Harvard School of Dental Medicine Class Day commencement ceremony.

== Awards ==
=== Emmy Awards ===
2006: He received an Emmy Award for his "Charity Hospital" coverage on Anderson Cooper 360°, highlighting the dire conditions in a New Orleans hospital during Hurricane Katrina.

2010: Gupta was honored with multiple Emmy Awards for his reporting on the devastating earthquake in Haiti, where he not only covered the event but also provided critical medical assistance.

2018. Gupta was honored with the Outstanding Science and Medical Emmy for the documentary: Separated.

2019. Gupta was honored with an Emmy award for the Special Report on Suicide.

=== Peabody Awards ===
2005: Gupta played an integral role in CNN's coverage of Hurricane Katrina, which won a Peabody award for its comprehensive and impact full reporting.

2010: His reporting on the Gulf of Mexico oil disaster was part of CNN's coverage that received a Peabody Award, recognizing the depth and quality of their journalism.

=== Alfred I. duPont-Columbia University Award ===
2005: Gupta's coverage of the Southeast Asia tsunami in Sri Lanka contributed to CNN's receipt of this prestigious award, often regarded as the broadcast equivalent of the Pulitzer Prize.

2015: The CNN documentary "Weed: Dr Sanjay Gupta Reports" was named one of the 14 winners of the 2015 awards for excellence in broadcast, digital and documentary news.

=== National Headliner Awards ===
2006: He was honored with four National Headliner Awards, recognizing his excellence in journalism and storytelling.

=== William Allen White Foundation National Citation ===
2022: Gupta was selected to receive the award in recognition of individuals for outstanding journalistic service. The award comes from a vote of the trustees of the Foundation, entitled from its namesake.

== Personal life ==
Gupta is married to Rebecca Olson, a family law attorney. They have three daughters. Gupta wrote a book called World War C: Lessons from the COVID-19 Pandemic and How to Prepare for the Next One about the COVID-19 pandemic.

== Bibliography ==
- Chasing Life: New Discoveries in the Search for Immortality to Help You Age Less Today (Warner Wellness, 2007, ISBN 9780446526500)
- Cheating Death: The Doctors and Medical Miracles that Are Saving Lives Against All Odds (Wellness Central, 2009, ISBN 9780446508872)
- Monday Mornings: A Novel (Grand Central Publishing, March 2012, ISBN 978-0446583855)
- Keep Sharp: Build a Better Brain at Any Age (Simon & Schuster, 2021, ISBN 9781501166754)
- World War C: Lessons from the COVID-19 Pandemic and How to Prepare for the Next One (Simon & Schuster, 2021, ISBN 9781982166106)
- It Doesn't Have to Hurt: Your Smart Guide to a Pain-Free Life (Simon & Schuster, 2025, ISBN 9781668014523)

== See also ==
- List of American novelists
- List of American print journalists
- List of surgeons
- List of television reporters
