= Jay S. Walker =

American businessman (born 1955)

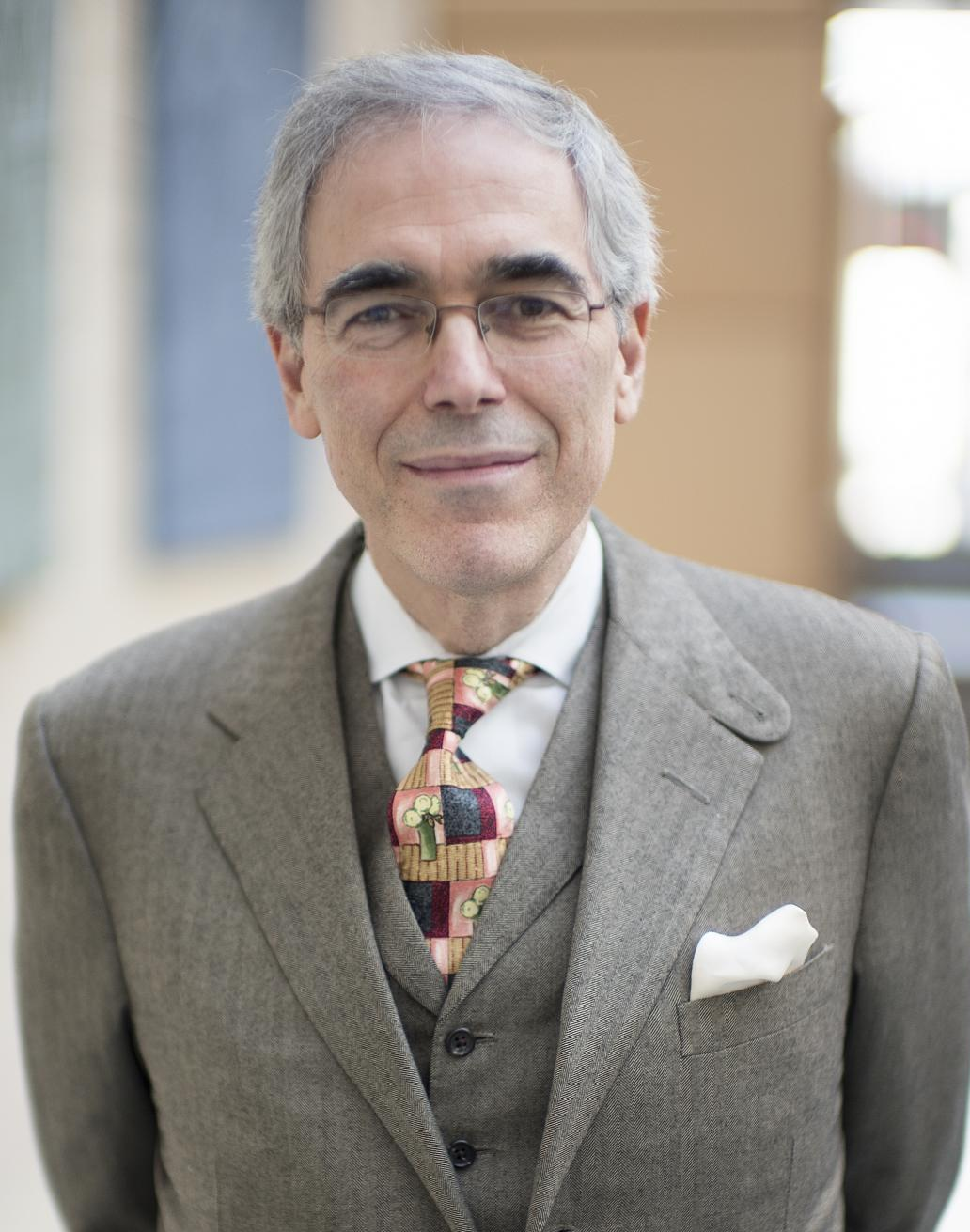
- Walker in 2015
- Born: November 5, 1955 (age 70); New York City, US
- Education: Cornell University (BS)
- Occupation: Chairman of Walker Digital
- Spouse: Eileen Walker (m. 1978)
- Children: 2
- Website: www.walkerdigital.com

Jay Scott Walker (born November 5, 1955) is an American businessman. He is chairman of Walker Digital, a privately held research and development lab focused on using digital networks to create new business systems. Walker is curator of TEDMED since 2011, and a co-founder of Priceline.com (now Booking Holdings) and Synapse Group, Inc. In 2000, Forbes estimated his net worth at $1.6 billion. By October 2000, his estimated worth was down to $333 million. As of 2013, he is not on the Forbes list of the world's billionaires.

A 1999 Forbes profile of Walker noted his reliance on patents as a business model. When developing patents, Walker uses a methodology that streamlines the process of identifying problems and developing their solutions. By pulling apart and eliminating "false problems", the methodology identifies solutions, which – according to Walker – have sustainable components that can lead to a long-term sustainable business. Walker owns 12 business method patents and 240 others pending.

== Early life ==
Walker attended Cornell University where he majored in industrial and labor relations and was a member of the Quill and Dagger society and the Sigma Phi Society. He graduated with a bachelor's degree in 1978.

While at Cornell, Walker was president of the Ivy League Monopoly Association, and co-authored the book 1000 Ways to Win Monopoly Games, with future Cornell president Jeffrey S. Lehman. This drew the ire of Parker Brothers, who threatened legal action and denied Walker admission to its sanctioned Monopoly tournaments. This in turn led Walker to join forces with Ralph Anspach, the inventor of Anti-Monopoly, who was also engaged in a legal battle with Parker Brothers.

== Business career ==
=== Synapse ===
In 1992 Walker and Michael Loeb co-founded New Sub Services, today known as Synapse Group, a company that used the credit card network to process magazine subscriptions. By 1998 Synapse had sold 30 million magazine subscriptions, with sales approaching $300 million. For his work, Walker won the Direct Marketing Association’s "Direct Marketer of the Year" award in 1999. In 2004 and 2005, Synapse was named one of the 25 "Best Places to Work in America" among medium-sized companies by the Great Place to Work Institute. As of 2011 Synapse employed more than 250 people.

In 2001 Time Warner purchased a controlling stake in Synapse for a sum in excess of $500 million, completing the transaction in 2006.

=== Priceline ===
Walker Digital launched Priceline.com in 1998, partially self-funding the startup company. Loeb also assisted with the early funding of Priceline. Priceline sold an estimated 40,000 tickets in its first quarter of operation. In 1999, Priceline went public. Walker left Priceline in late 2000. The two patents that protected Priceline.com were said to be worth $18.5 billion at the time.

=== Partnership with IGT ===
In 2006 Walker Digital entered into a strategic partnership with International Game Technology (IGT), the world’s largest manufacturer of casino games. He worked with IGT to develop innovative concepts and technologies for dozens of networked slot machines and other gaming devices, initially under a comprehensive license agreement.

The first result of the partnership was Guaranteed Play, a new method for casino game players to purchase game play. Customers receive a fixed number of slot machine spins or blackjack hands, known as a "session" of play, at a discounted price, by paying in advance.

=== Perfect Pay Baccarat ===
In 2009 Walker Digital subsidiary Walker Digital Gaming introduced the Perfect Pay Baccarat (card game) table and Smart Table Network, supporting Elite Baccarat. Industry business journals reported that Perfect Pay utilizes RFID technology to track baccarat wagers, hand outcomes, payouts and player ratings in real time while eliminating losses from dealer mis-pays, counterfeit chips and other problems. Perfect Pay and Elite Baccarat both won Gold Awards from Casino Journal at the 2009 Gaming Technology Summit. He later founded Upside Travel.

=== LabTV ===
In 2013, Walker founded LabTV to encourage students to consider a medical research career.

=== ApiJect Systems Corporation ===
In 2018, Walker and Marc Koska co-founded ApiJect Systems, Corp, a medical technology company that creates single-use plastic injectors. He is the company’s chairman.

== Patent lawsuits and disputes ==
In January 2001, the Connecticut Attorney General filed suit against Walker Digital. Faced with mounting financial losses, Jay Walker laid off 106 of his 125 employees, violating Federal employment law requiring 60 days notice when laying off more than 33% of the workforce. On September 4, 2002, Walker Digital settled for $275,000 to be split amongst the laid off employees. In October 15, 2009 Walker Digital, LLC filed its first patent infringement action. The suit against Microsoft, Hewlett-Packard, and Dell, Inc., was decided on January 3, 2011, as non-infringed.

In November 2010 Walker Digital LLC sued Facebook for friending, or "Method and system for establishing and maintaining user-controlled anonymous communications".

On April 11, 2011, Walker Digital filed 15 lawsuits against more than 100 defendants including Amazon.com, Google and Microsoft for unauthorized use of its intellectual properties.

According to a 2016 PBS Newshour profile, "Walker is named on more than 500 issued and pending patents in the U.S. and internationally. But his enforcement of that intellectual property has led some to label him a 'patent troll'." Walker has disputed this characterization, saying he treats litigation as a last resort.

== Other activities ==
- One of 164 "directors" of the Atlantic Council, a Washington DC–based think tank.
- Walker has spoken at events of World Information Transfer, Inc., a not-for-profit, non-governmental organization in General Consultative Status with the United Nations, on health and environmental issues.

Walker is a Patron of TED, a small non-profit organisation dedicated to "Ideas Worth Spreading". He is a frequent speaker and contributor to its conferences, having delivered talks on such topics as human imagination and "English language mania", among others.

In April 2011, Walker Purchased TEDMED from Marc Hodosh.

Walker has partnered with the World Economic Forum in Davos, Switzerland, to develop enhanced communications systems between business and governments.

He has testified before the U.S. Congress Joint Economic Committee on economic policy and on how to reform the patent system. He is available as a speaker for business groups, non-profit organisations and the academic community.

Walker funded the development of two public policy documentary films about the space race and the role of science in American life. The first film focused on the impact of Sputnik on America’s education system. The second film, "Sputnik Mania", explored broader U.S. cultural reactions to Sputnik.

== The Walker Library of the History of Human Imagination ==
Walker owns what he calls "The Walker Library of the History of Human Imagination." Located in his Ridgefield, Connecticut home, the 3,600 sq. ft. private facility contains more than 50,000 volumes. The architecture is a multi-level, maze-like setting, inspired in part by the paradoxical spaces depicted by artist M. C. Escher.

The library is the subject of a short documentary film by David Hoffman, and was profiled as "the most amazing library in the world" by Wired magazine. It is not open to the public.

== Honors and awards ==
In 1999 the Industry Standard named him the year's "Most Influential New Business Strategist".

In 2009 the Entrepreneurship Program at his alma mater honored Walker as the "Cornell Entrepreneur of the Year".

== Personal life ==
Walker married Eileen McManus on April 18, 1982. They have two children. Eileen Walker is a trustee for Cornell University, Chair of the Board of Trustees of the Harvey School in Westchester County, New York and a former personnel executive at IBM.
