= Suneel Gupta =

American entrepreneur

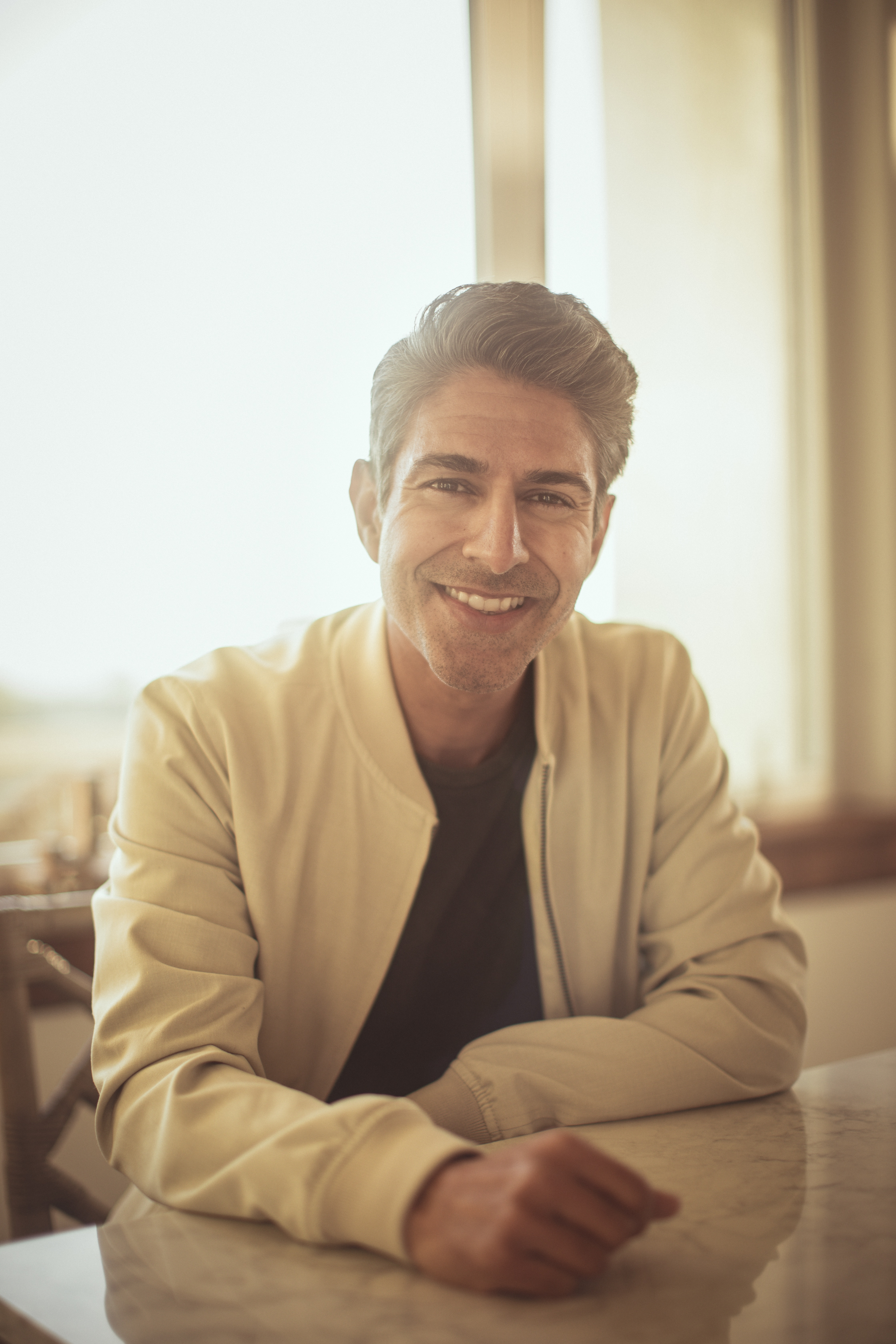
- Born: Novi, Michigan, U.S.
- Education: University of Michigan, Dearborn (BS); Northwestern University (MBA, JD)
- Occupations: Entrepreneur, author, tv host, keynote speaker
- Known for: Backable (2021); Everyday Dharma (2023)
- Mother: Damyanti Gupta
- Family: Sanjay Gupta (brother)
- Website: www.suneelgupta.com

Suneel Gupta is an American entrepreneur, author, television host, and keynote speaker. He founded the healthcare company Rise Labs, and is the author of two books: Backable (2021) and Everyday Dharma (2023). He is the host of the television series, Business Class.

== Early life and education ==
Gupta was born and raised in Novi, Michigan. His parents, Damyanti and Subhash Gupta, had migrated from India to the United States in the 1960s and worked for Ford Motor Company as engineers. His mother was a refugee who became the first woman engineer at Ford having an advanced degree, as reported by Time. He is of Sindhi descent.

Gupta graduated from Novi High School where he was active in politics. He obtained an undergraduate degree in computer science from the University of Michigan-Dearborn, an MBA from Kellogg School of Management, and a Juris Doctor from Northwestern Law School. He is licensed to practice law in front of the United States Supreme Court and in California. He had a brief stint as a speechwriter in the West Wing during the Clinton administration.

== Career ==
Gupta's career began at the consulting firm Accenture in the early 2000s. He then worked for Mozilla Labs where he moved from legal domain to product design and went on to become director. In 2009, he joined the early-stage startup Groupon in Chicago as the company's first VP of Product Development.

In 2013, Gupta founded Rise Labs, a wellness startup that provided nutrition coaching through a mobile app. The company raised $4 million in funding from Google Ventures and Greylock Partners among others, before being acquired by One Medical in 2016 for an estimated $20 million. Following the acquisition, Gupta became head of mobile business at One Medical, in addition to continuing in his existing role as CEO of Rise. Subsequently, Rise partnered with First Lady Michelle Obama's nonprofit initiative Partnership for a Healthier America.

In 2017, Gupta joined venture capital firm Kleiner Perkins as an entrepreneur in residence, and became a visiting scholar at Harvard Medical School, before moving back to Michigan.

In late 2017, Gupta announced his candidacy for the 2018 House of Representatives elections in Michigan's 11th congressional district, raising over $1 million in funding for his campaign. Gupta came in third place in the Democratic primary with 21.4% of the votes, losing to Haley Stevens who received 27% of the votes.

In 2018, Gupta became an emissary for Gross National Happiness between the United States and Bhutan.

In 2021, Gupta published his first book titled Backable, co-authored by journalist Carlye Adler. The book employs case studies and interviews to identify the qualities that make an individual "backable".

After the release of Backable, Gupta became the host of the television series, Business Class, which features Gupta in conversation with notable entrepreneurs. The series entered its third season in 2023, streaming on Amazon Prime Video.

His second book, Everyday Dharma, was released in 2023 and explores the theme of personal development centered around the Eastern philosophy concept of dharma.

== Books ==
- (2021) Backable: The Surprising Truth Behind What Makes People Take a Chance on You. Little, Brown and Company, ISBN 978-0316494519
- (2023) Everyday Dharma: 8 Essential Practices for Finding Success and Joy in Everything You Do. HarperCollins Publishers, ISBN 978-0063143883

== Personal life ==
Gupta is married to tech journalist Leena Rao who has written for TechCrunch and Fortune. They have two daughters–Sammy and Serena.
