= World War C =

2021 book by Sanjay Gupta

World War C: Lessons from the COVID-19 Pandemic and How to Prepare for the Next One
- First edition
- Author: Sanjay Gupta
- Publisher: Simon & Schuster
- Publication date: October 5, 2021
- ISBN: 978-1-982166-10-6

World War C: Lessons from the COVID-19 Pandemic and How to Prepare for the Next One is a 2021 book by Sanjay Gupta, published by Simon & Schuster.

== Synopsis ==
In the book, Gupta urges to plan ahead for future pandemics and evaluate the uncertainty of unseen threats. The book says humanity will likely have to live with COVID forever, but that doesn't mean it has to control our lives. It also analyzed how COVID-19 misinformation was spread and propagated during the pandemic, and its impact on health policy in the United States.

== Reception ==
The book was praised for its examination of both the history and epidemiology of COVID-19, and its optimistic outlook on methods to prevent damage caused by future pandemics. Kirkus Reviews called it a "wise, well-informed assessment of present and future health perils."
