= ApiJect Systems =

- Industry: Medical technology
- Founded: 2018; 7 years ago
- Founder: Marc Koska
- Headquarters: Stamford, Connecticut
- Key people: Marc Koska (Founder); Jay S. Walker (CEO)
- Products: Pre-filled Injectors
- Website: apiject.com

ApiJect Systems Corporation is an American company founded in 2018 by Marc Koska and based in Stamford, Connecticut that produces pre-filled single use plastic injectors. ApiJect works with pharmaceutical and biotech companies to fill their injectable drug products into single-dose prefilled injectors. The company claimed to have the capacity to manufacture pre-filled COVID-19 vaccine syringes by the end of 2020.

== History ==
ApiJect Systems was founded in 2018 by Marc Koska, who invented the ApiJect injector, a prefilled, single-use plastic injector, as a low cost way to get medicine to poorer countries. Koska previously invented the self-locking K1 syringe to prevent needle reuse.

In 2020, ApiJect pivoted in order to meet U.S. demand for COVID-19 vaccinations. In May 2020, the U.S. Department of Health and Human Services and the U.S. Department of Defense signed a $138 million deal with ApiJect, called Project Jumpstart, to facilitate the production of 100 million prefilled syringes by the end of 2020 and 500 million in 2021 in the event that a COVID-19 vaccine became available.

In November 2020, ApiJect was approved for a $590 million loan from the U.S. International Development Finance Corporation to construct a multi-facility campus. The project broke ground in February 2021 in Durham, North Carolina, and was among the largest projects in the nation to break ground that month. The factory is designed to deliver production capacity of up to 2 to 3 billion units annually. It will be suitable for vaccines requiring standard cold storage, including those in need of ultra-cold storage down to -70 degrees Celsius.

As of April 21, 2021 the company has failed to produce any syringes, however it has met its obligations under its federal contracts and loan commitments by lining up a subcontractor that promises to produce the syringes once they obtain FDA approval. The CEO of the company stated in July 2020: "The fact of this matter is, it would be crazy for people to just rely on us...We should be America’s backup at this point, but probably not its primary.” According to the White House 100 Days report of June 2021, Health and Human Services is planning to expand Project Jumpstart to $250 million per month through 2023.

In December 2021, ApiJect and Fareva announced a licensing agreement to establish three Blow-Fill-Seal manufacturing lines in France.

In April 2022, ApiJect opened the ApiJect Technology Development Center in Florida, with research and development investment from the U.S. Office of the Assistant Secretary for Preparedness and Response and the U.S. Department of Defense. The center works with pharmaceutical companies to develop prefilled injectors.

In May 2022, ApiJect raised $111 million from Royalty Pharma and Jefferies Financial Group, valuing ApiJect at approximately $300 million.

== Product ==
ApiJect’s prefilled injector uses Blow-Fill-Seal (BFS) manufacturing technology, which is recognized as an advanced aseptic liquid packaging process. The prefilled injector is created by screwing the pen needle-style hub onto the top of the BFS container. BFS process uses pharmaceutical-grade plastic resin to create, fill and seal a strip of 12-to-25 drug containers per production line every three seconds.
