= USS Carl Vinson =

US Navy Nimitz-class aircraft carrier

USS Carl Vinson (CVN-70)
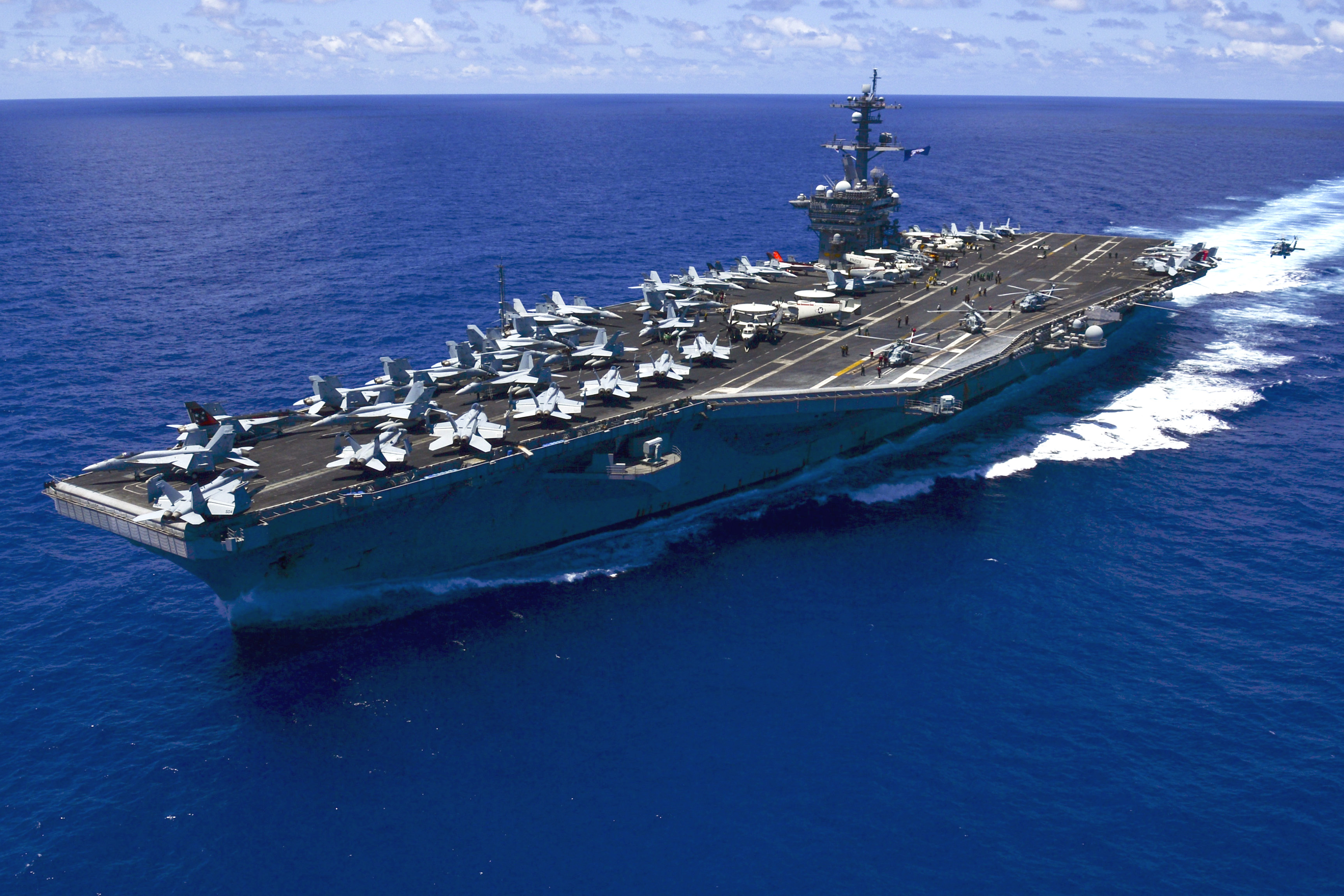
- USS Carl Vinson (CVN-70)

History

United States
- Name: Carl Vinson
- Namesake: Carl Vinson
- Ordered: 5 April 1974
- Builder: Newport News Shipbuilding
- Laid down: 11 October 1975
- Launched: 15 March 1980
- Christened: 15 March 1980
- Acquired: 26 February 1982
- Commissioned: 13 March 1982
- Home port: Coronado
- Identification: MMSI number: 369970409; Callsign: NCVV; Hull number: CVN-70
- Motto: Vis Per Mare; (Strength from the Sea)
- Status: in active service
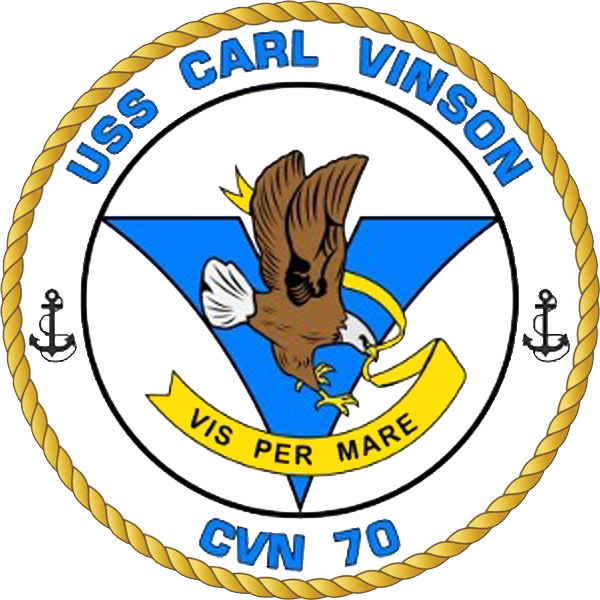
- Badge

General characteristics
- Class & type: Nimitz-class aircraft carrier
- Displacement: 101,300 long tons (113,500 short tons)
- Length: Overall: 1,092 ft (332.8 m); Waterline: 1,040 ft (317.0 m)
- Beam: Overall: 252 ft (76.8 m); Waterline: 134 ft (40.8 m)
- Draft: Maximum navigational: 37 feet (11.3 m); Limit: 41 feet (12.5 m)
- Propulsion: 2 × Westinghouse A4W nuclear reactors (HEU 93.5%); 4 × steam turbines; 4 × shafts; 260,000 shp (190 MW)
- Speed: 30 knots (56 km/h; 35 mph)+
- Range: Unlimited distance; 20–25 years
- Complement: Ship's company: 3,532; Air wing: 2,480
- Crew: 6,012
- Sensors & processing systems: AN/SPS-48E 3-D air search radar; AN/SPS-49(V)5 2-D air search radar; AN/SPQ-9B target acquisition radar; AN/SPN-46 air traffic control radars; AN/SPN-43C air traffic control radar; AN/SPN-41 landing aid radars; 4 × Mk 91 NSSM guidance systems; 4 × Mk 95 radars
- Electronic warfare & decoys: AN/SLQ-32A(V)4 countermeasures suite; SLQ-25A Nixie torpedo countermeasures
- Armament: 2 × Mk 57 Mod13 Sea Sparrow Launchers 2 × RIM-116 Rolling Airframe Missile Launchers 2 × Phalanx CIWS
- Armor: Unknown
- Aircraft carried: 90 fixed wing and helicopters

USS Carl Vinson (CVN-70) is the United States Navy's third Nimitz-class supercarrier. She is named for Carl Vinson (1883–1981), a congressman from Georgia, in recognition of his contributions to the U.S. Navy. The ship was launched during Vinson's lifetime in 1980, undertook her maiden voyage in 1983, and underwent refueling and overhaul between 2005 and 2009. Carl Vinson is currently the flagship of Carrier Strike Group 1 with Carrier Air Wing Two serving as her air wing.

Along with deployments in Operation Desert Strike, Operation Iraqi Freedom, Operation Southern Watch, and Operation Enduring Freedom, Carl Vinson has been involved in a number of notable events. The body of Osama bin Laden was buried at sea in 2011 from the deck of Carl Vinson, and that same year, on Veterans Day, she played host to the first NCAA basketball game on an aircraft carrier, between North Carolina and Michigan State.

== Namesake ==
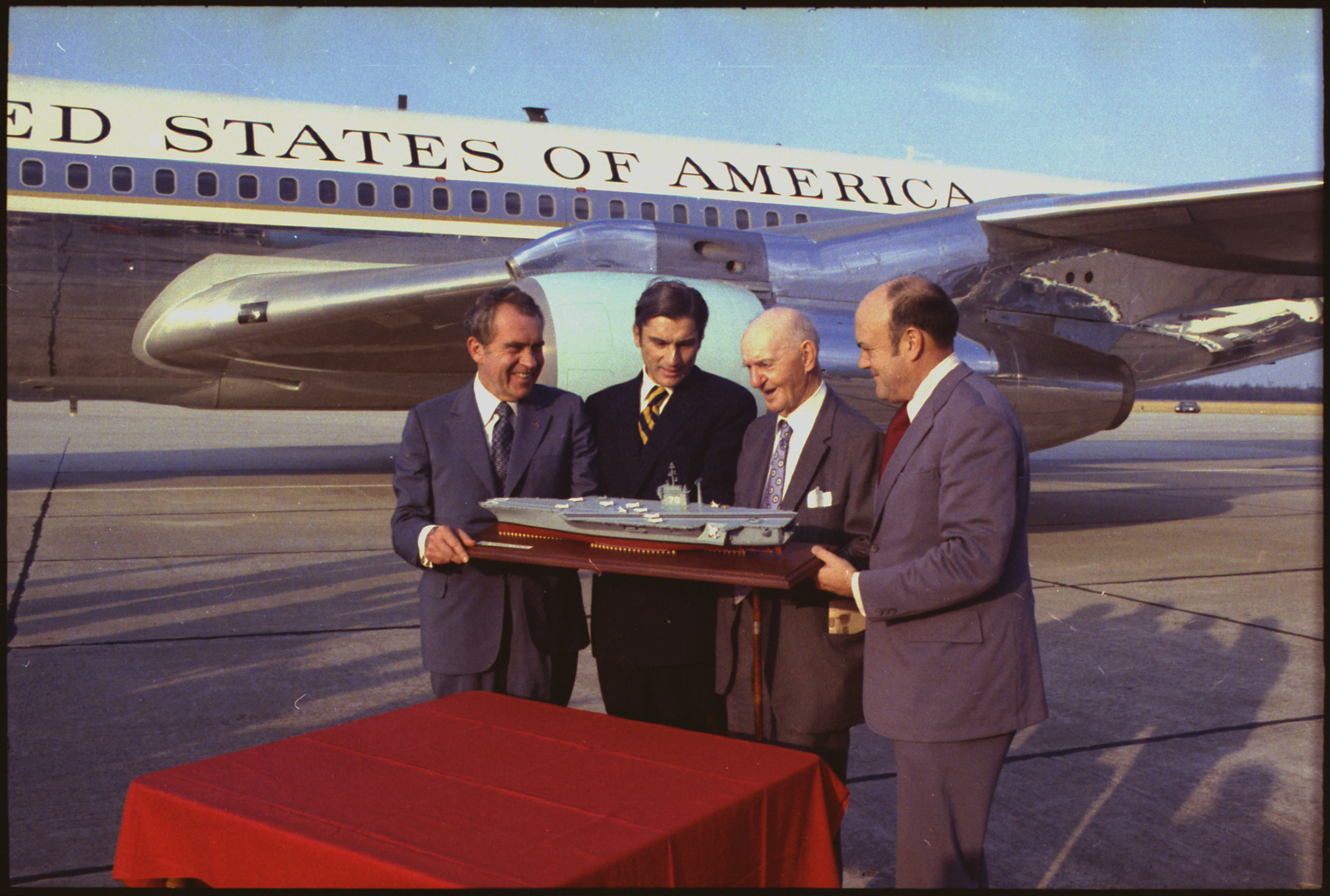
President Richard Nixon, Navy Secretary John Warner, and Defense Secretary Melvin Laird present Congressman Vinson (third from left) with a model of the ship that will bear his name, 18 November 1973.

A member of the United States House of Representatives for 50 years, Carl Vinson was the Chairman of the old House Naval Affairs and Armed Services Committee for 16 years, and Chairman of its successor, the House Armed Services Committee, for 14 years. Vinson was the principal sponsor of the so-called "Vinson Acts", culminating in the Two-Ocean Navy Act of 1940, which provided for the massive naval shipbuilding effort in World War II.

=== Ship seal ===
The seal of USS Carl Vinson shows an eagle, wings spread and talons extended, carrying a banner in its beak. The eagle is emblematic of the nation and the ship's motto, and also represents the power that resides in the ship's aircraft. The eagle flies in the form of a stylized letter "V," the initial of the ship's namesake, Congressman Carl Vinson. The "V" also represents the ship's hull when viewed bow-on. Inscribed on the banner that the eagle carries is the Latin phrase "Vis Per Mare" which means "Strength through the Sea".

=== Carrier Strike Group One ===
In October 2009, the US Navy announced that Carl Vinson would be the flagship of the newly established Carrier Strike Group One (CSG1), based in San Diego. The ship, under the command of then Captain Bruce H. Lindsey, departed Norfolk for San Diego on 12 January 2010. Accompanying the carrier was Carrier Air Wing Seventeen, Destroyer Squadron 1 and the guided missile cruiser Bunker Hill.

== Design and construction ==
The keel was laid at Newport News Shipbuilding on 11 October 1975, and on 15 March 1980 the ship was christened and launched. The USS Carl Vinson was the first major U.S. Navy warship to be named after a person still living, and Congressman Carl Vinson became the first person in the history of the United States Navy to witness a ship's launching in his honor. After builder sea trials, she was delivered to the Navy on 26 February 1982 and commissioned on 13 March 1982.

== Ship history ==
=== 1980s ===
An F-14A Tomcat of VF-111 landing on the Carl Vinson prior to the maiden cruise, 1983

USS Carl Vinson was commissioned on 13 March 1982 at Newport News, Virginia. Present were the Chief of Naval Operations Admiral Thomas B. Hayward, Secretary of the Navy John F. Lehman, keynote speaker Senator John Tower, and ship's sponsor Molly Snead, who was Vinson's nurse for 34 years. After commissioning, Carl Vinson put to sea to conduct flight deck certifications, an evaluation designed to test the ship's ability to conduct modern US Navy carrier air operations. That was followed by numerous at sea periods for various training evolutions along the East Coast.

Carl Vinson departed Norfolk on 1 March 1983 with Carrier Air Wing 15 embarked for her maiden deployment, an eight-month, around-the-world cruise that had them operate in the Mediterranean Sea, Atlantic Ocean, Indian Ocean, Arabian Sea, South China Sea, and Pacific Ocean in a multitude of exercises and with port visits in Monte Carlo, Monaco, Casablanca, Morocco, Abidjan, Ivory Coast, Perth, Australia, Subic Bay, Philippines, Hong Kong, Sasebo, Japan, Pusan, Republic of Korea, and Pearl Harbor, Hawaii, before arriving in her new homeport of Naval Air Station Alameda, California, arriving on 28 October 1983.

Carl Vinson participated in RIMPAC '84 before departing on 14 October 1984 for an overseas deployment in the Western Pacific. Carrier Air Wing 15 was embarked. From January until April 1985, Carl Vinson was in the Indian Ocean for 107 consecutive days. The WESTPAC deployment included Sea of Japan operations while pursuing a Soviet Charlie I class submarine in the Indian Ocean.

The carrier received her first Meritorious Unit Commendation for operations conducted from November 1984 to May 1985. In February, the Chief of Naval Operations named Carl Vinson the winner of the Admiral James H. Flatley Memorial Award for operational readiness and aviation safety for 1984.

On 12 August 1986, the ship departed Alameda for a western Pacific deployment, again with CVW-15 aboard, and in the process became the first modern U.S. aircraft carrier to operate in the Bering Sea. In January 1987, after operating extensively in the Indian Ocean and North Arabian Sea, Carl Vinson transited the Bering Sea once more while returning to NAS Alameda.

Carl Vinson and CVW-15 departed for the ship's fourth overseas deployment on 15 June 1988. While on station, the carrier supported Operation Earnest Will, the escort of U.S. flagged tankers in the Persian Gulf. The carrier returned to the States on 16 December 1988 and was awarded the Admiral Flatley Memorial Award for aviation safety for 1988.

On 18 September 1989, the carrier departed Alameda to participate in PACEX '89, the largest peacetime naval exercise since the Second World War. During the exercise Carl Vinson operated in the Bering Sea and the Aleutian Islands, eventually leading a three-carrier battle group operation in the Sea of Japan and the Pacific Ocean. Carl Vinson had a port call in Pusan, South Korea, and then returned to her home port of Alameda shortly after the devastating 1989 Loma Prieta earthquake.

=== 1990s ===
Carl Vinson departed on her fifth deployment (again with CVW-15) on 1 February 1990, the last deployment for the A-7 Corsair. The ship returned to Alameda on 30 July 1990. On 22 September 1990, Carl Vinson entered the yards at Bremerton Naval Station, Washington for a 28-month complex overhaul (COH). The carrier received her first COMNAVAIRPAC Battle "E" award for 1990.

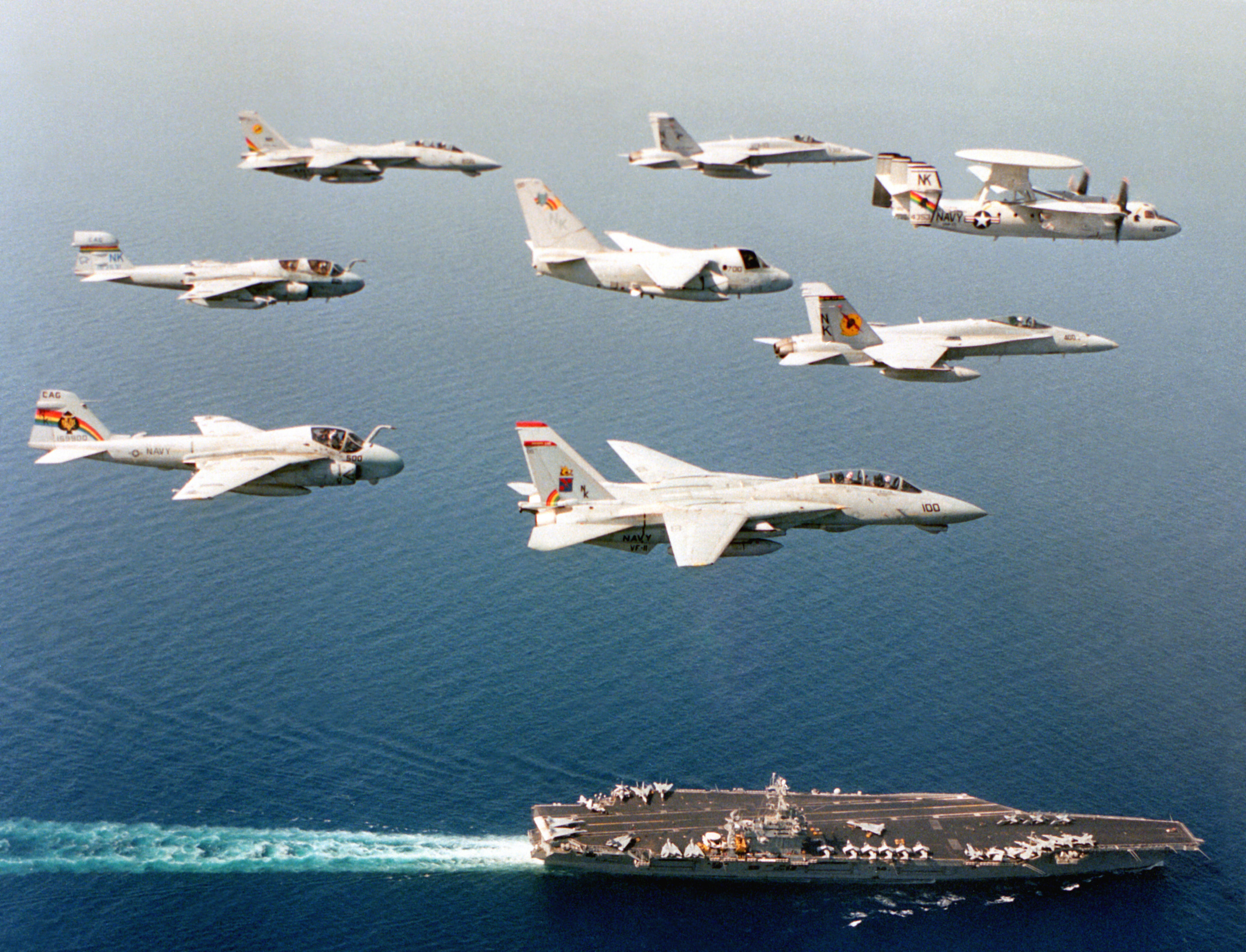
CVW-14 aircraft over Carl Vinson in 1994

On 17 February 1994, the carrier, with Carrier Air Wing Fourteen embarked, departed for the Persian Gulf in support of Operation Southern Watch. The carrier returned to Alameda on 17 August 1994, receiving her third Admiral Flatley Award for aviation safety.

In 1995, a documentary entitled Carrier: Fortress at Sea was aired on the Discovery Channel, which chronicled the carrier's six-month-long voyage to and from the Persian Gulf.

From 26 August until 3 September 1995, Carl Vinson participated in Exercise Ke Koa, as well as ceremonies to commemorate the end of World War II in the Pacific. During these ceremonies, President Bill Clinton visited the ship in Hawaii. As part of the commemoration ceremonies, Carl Vinson launched 11 World War II-era planes.

The ship departed for her seventh deployment 14 May 1996, heading for the Persian Gulf with CVW-14 in support for Operation Southern Watch and Operation Desert Strike. The ship also participated in Exercise Rugged Nautilus before returning to Alameda on 14 November 1996.

With the closing of Naval Air Station Alameda, the ship was transferred to Bremerton, Washington, arriving at her new homeport on 17 January 1997, where she played host to the last carrier launch and recovery operations for the A-6E Intruder.

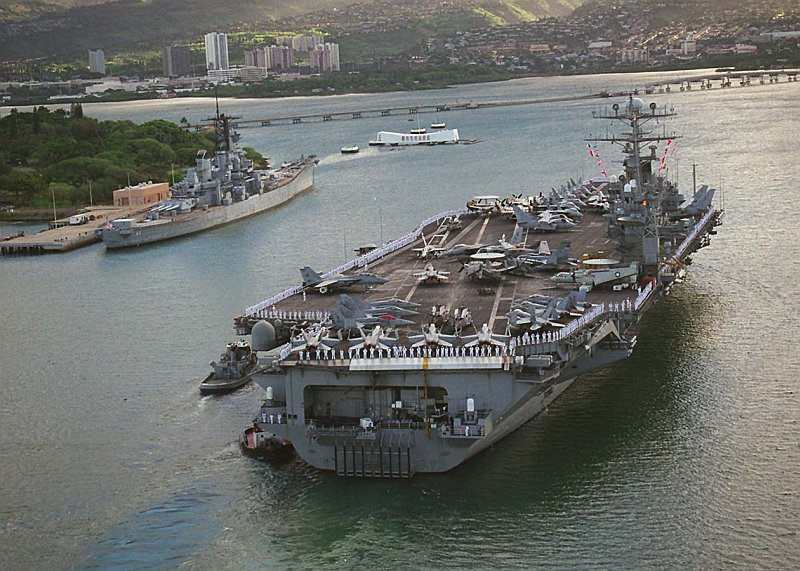
Carl Vinson enters Pearl Harbor with CVW-11 aboard with USS Missouri in background

In 1998 with Carrier Air Wing Eleven (CVW-11) embarked, the ship participated in RIMPAC '98. During the exercise on the morning of 10 August, the Australian diesel-electric submarine HMAS Onslow located the 'enemy' carrier and 'sank' her. Onslow closed to within 300 meters (980 ft) without being detected, then released green flares to indicate her location, 'sinking' the supercarrier. Carl Vinson then departed for the Persian Gulf, launching airstrikes on 19 December 1998 in support of Operation Desert Fox and Operation Southern Watch. These strikes continued into March 1999. In July 1999, Carl Vinson was drydocked in the Puget Sound Naval Shipyard for 13 months as the Navy spent more than $230 million to upgrade the ship. Post refit shakedowns continued into 2000.

=== 2000s ===
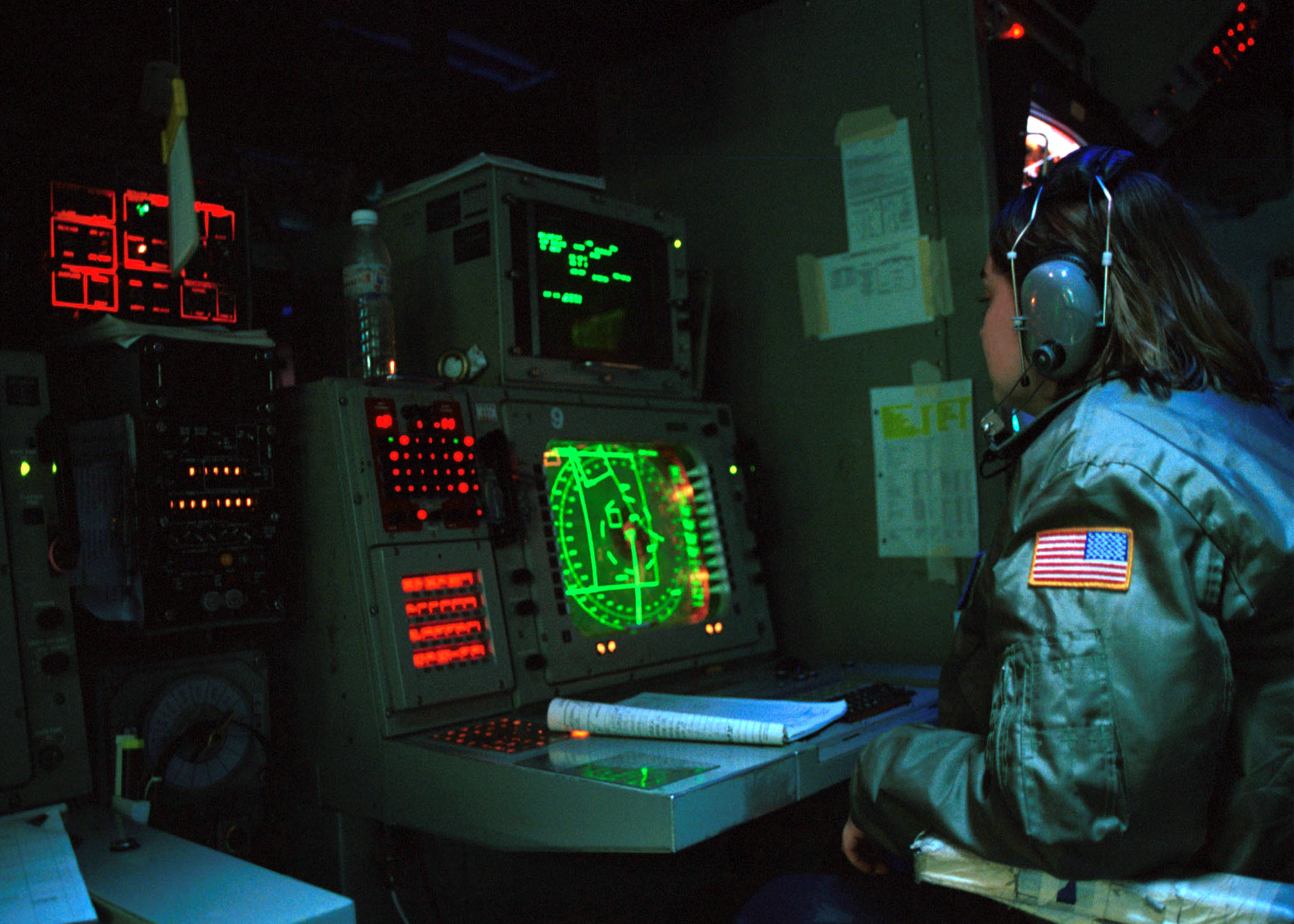
A watchstander at her station in the combat information center of USS Carl Vinson in the year 2001.

In February 2001, Carl Vinson hosted actors Gene Hackman, David Keith, Owen Wilson, and others for filming of the carrier scenes for the movie Behind Enemy Lines during intermediate pre-deployment underway workups. During this two-week period, Carl Vinson crewmembers and CVW 11 crews took part in the filming along with the actors and film crews. Later, prior to commencement of Operation Enduring Freedom, David Keith returned to Carl Vinson on station in the North Arabian Sea to present the first international viewing of Behind Enemy Lines to the combined ship and air wing crew. Prior to deploying to the Persian Gulf, Carl Vinson (CVN-70) was on a roughly four week carrier quals mission off the coast of Hawaii.

==== September 11 attacks ====
On 23 July 2001, Carl Vinson steamed from Bremerton, Washington, to San Diego, California, where CVW-11 airgroup once again embarked, then was bound for the Persian Gulf to support Operation Southern Watch. This changed abruptly on 11 September 2001, as the ship was rounding the tip of India. In response to the terrorist attacks on U.S. soil, Carl Vinson changed course and sped toward the North Arabian Sea, where on 7 October 2001, Carl Vinson launched the first airstrikes in support of Operation Enduring Freedom. For 72 days, Carl Vinson, along with Carrier Wing 11, launched over 4,000 combat sorties in the global war on terrorism, earning the ship the Global War on Terrorism Expeditionary Medal. Carl Vinson earned the Battle E and Navy Unit Commendation during this deployment. In mid December, Carl Vinson began the return trip home, briefly stopping in Pearl Harbor Hawaii to commence a "Tiger Cruise" allowing crew member family members the opportunity to ride the ship to her homeport of Bremerton, Washington, arriving there on 23 January 2002. In April, the ship was overhauled, setting sail in September for a post-refit shakedown. During this time several new operational systems were installed, and the ship's flight deck and catapults were completely renovated. Numerous other spaces and crew living areas were also entirely restored, drastically improving working and living conditions for the crew. Completing her maintenance and overhaul period in record-setting time, Carl Vinson and crew got underway in September to conduct sea trials.

In January 2003, she was set for a one-month work up for Flight Deck Quals with Carrier Air Wing Nine (CVW-9) embarked. Due to the start of Operation Iraqi Freedom the ship was extended at sea indefinitely. From January 2003 until September 2003, she made port calls in Hawaii, Guam, South Korea, Japan, Australia, Hong Kong, and Singapore. After nine months, Carl Vinson finally returned to Bremerton on 15 September 2003. Carl Vinson participated in Foal Eagle, an annually scheduled joint and combined training exercise conducted in the Korean theatre.

==== Bawean Incident ====
On 3 July 2003, five F/A-18 Hornets from Carl Vinson were intercepted by F-16s from the Indonesian Air Force near Bawean Island over the Java Sea where they engaged in a dogfight and electronic warfare. Carl Vinson and her strike group were transiting through the Java Sea and had sought permission from Indonesia. However, Indonesia denied receiving any request for permission. Later, Indonesia filed a diplomatic complaint to the US for trespassing on its territory.

In competition year 2004, Carl Vinson won the Marjorie Sterrett Battleship Fund Award, awarded to the most battle-ready ship in the U.S. Pacific Fleet.

In January 2005, Carl Vinson departed Bremerton, Washington, with CVW-9 embarked for a seven-month deployment, including several months in the Persian Gulf in support of Operation Iraqi Freedom & Operation Enduring Freedom. Highlights of the cruise included port calls to Singapore, Guam, Bahrain, the United Arab Emirates, Rhodes, Greece and Lisbon, Portugal. Carl Vinson ended this deployment at Naval Station Norfolk on 31 July 2005. During this deployment two Marine F-18 pilots were lost over Iraq.

==== Refueling and Complex Overhaul 2005 ====
In November 2005, Carl Vinson became the third Nimitz-class carrier to undergo a mid-life Refueling and Complex Overhaul (RCOH), which was scheduled to last 36 months. The ship moved out of dry dock to a pier side berth at Northrop Grumman Newport News shipyard in May 2007.

Carl Vinson commenced post-refueling sea trials on 28 June 2009 and returned to Naval Station Norfolk on 1 July 2009. The Navy accepted the carrier back into the fleet on 11 July 2009, after successful completion of her sea trials.

In October 2009, Carl Vinson entered a four-month shipyard maintenance period at Northrop Grumman Newport News in preparation for her upcoming transit to the Pacific in the spring. The ship was scheduled to transit around South America to her new home at NAS North Island, San Diego, joining sister-carriers USS CVN-68 and USS CVN-76, by early 2010.

=== 2010s ===
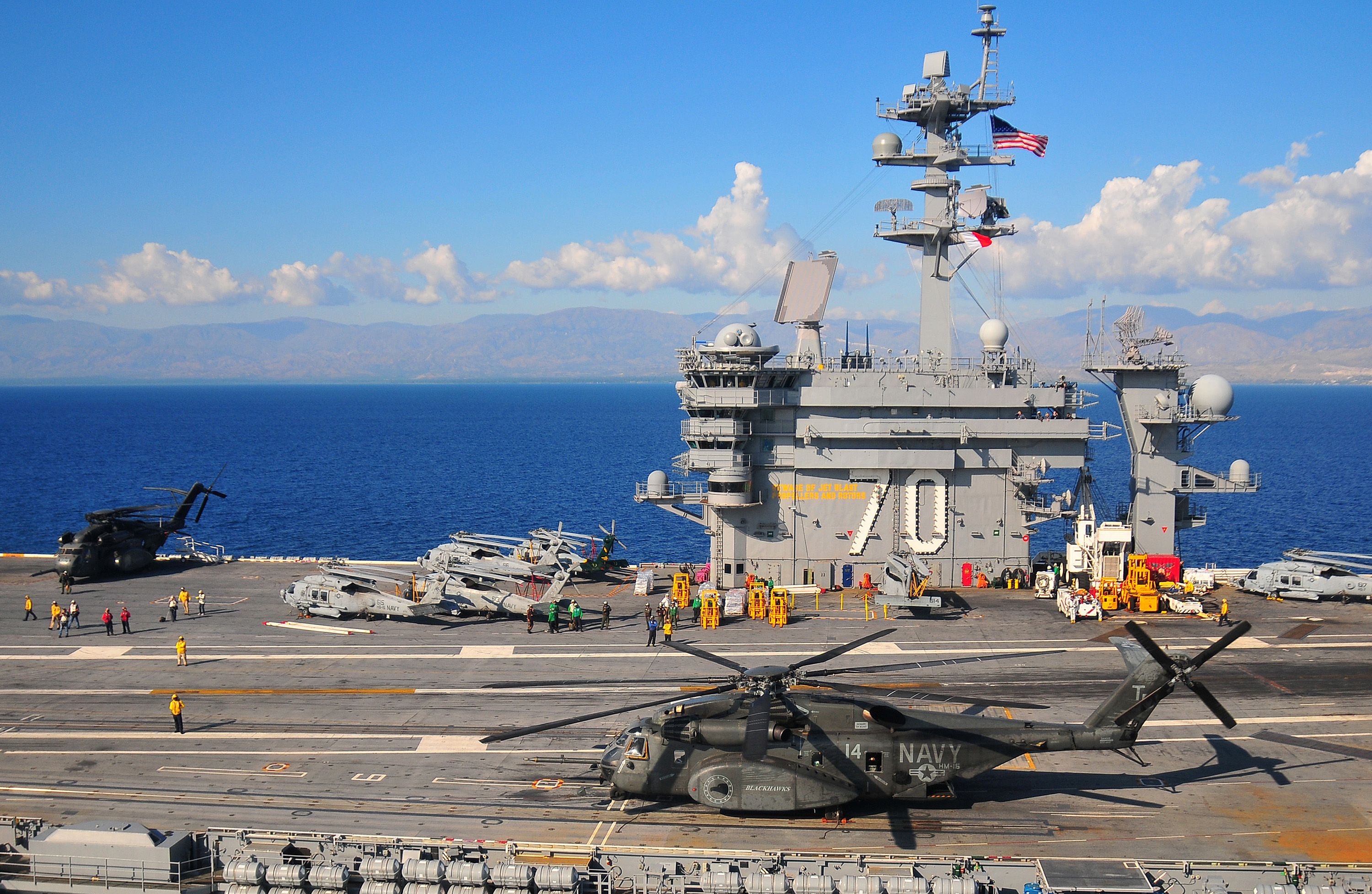
Carl Vinson off Haiti, to aid in earthquake relief; the ship carried 19 helicopters specially for this mission.

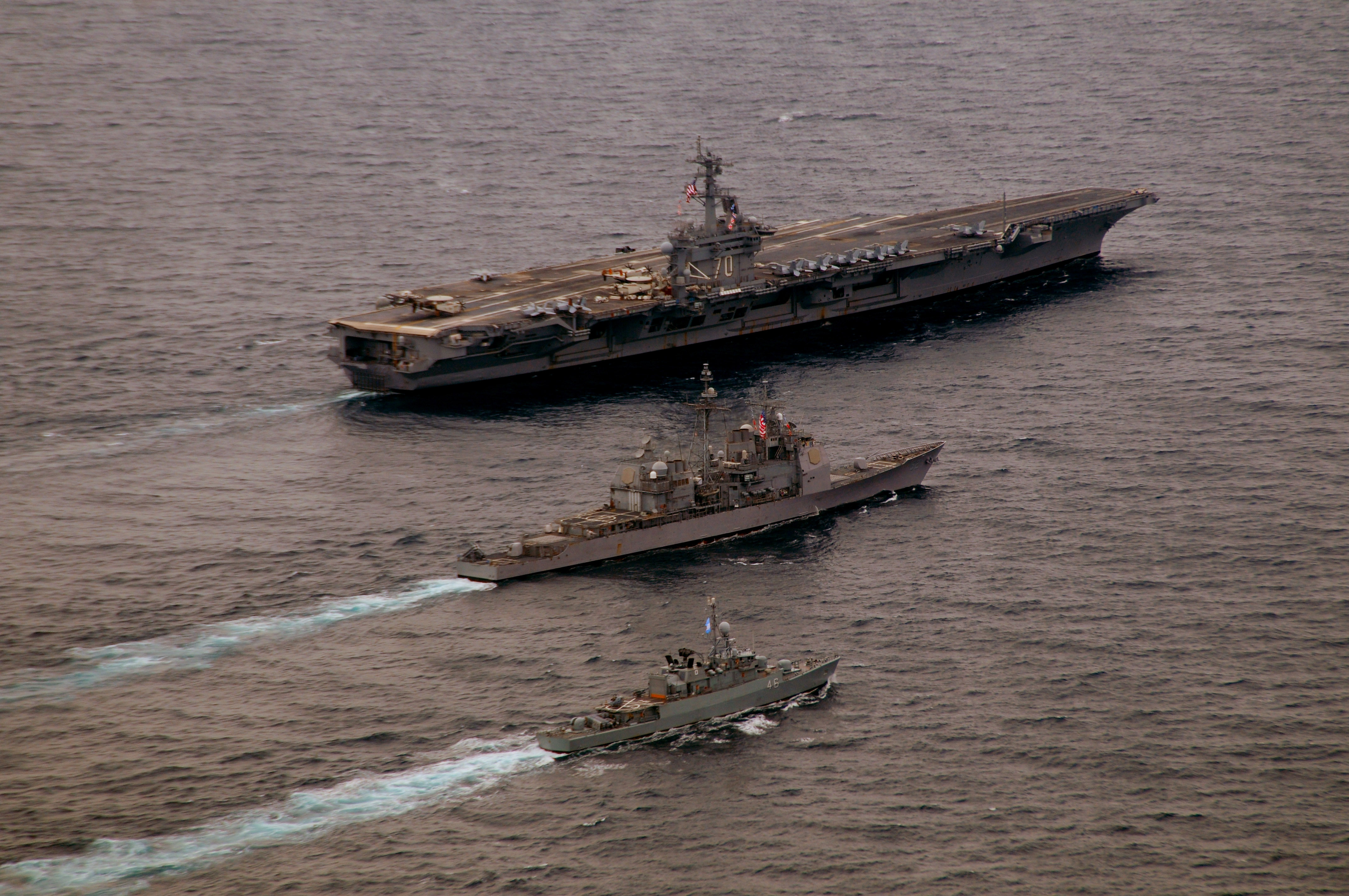
Carl Vinson in formation with USS Bunker Hill and Argentine frigate ARA Gómez Roca during Southern Seas 2010

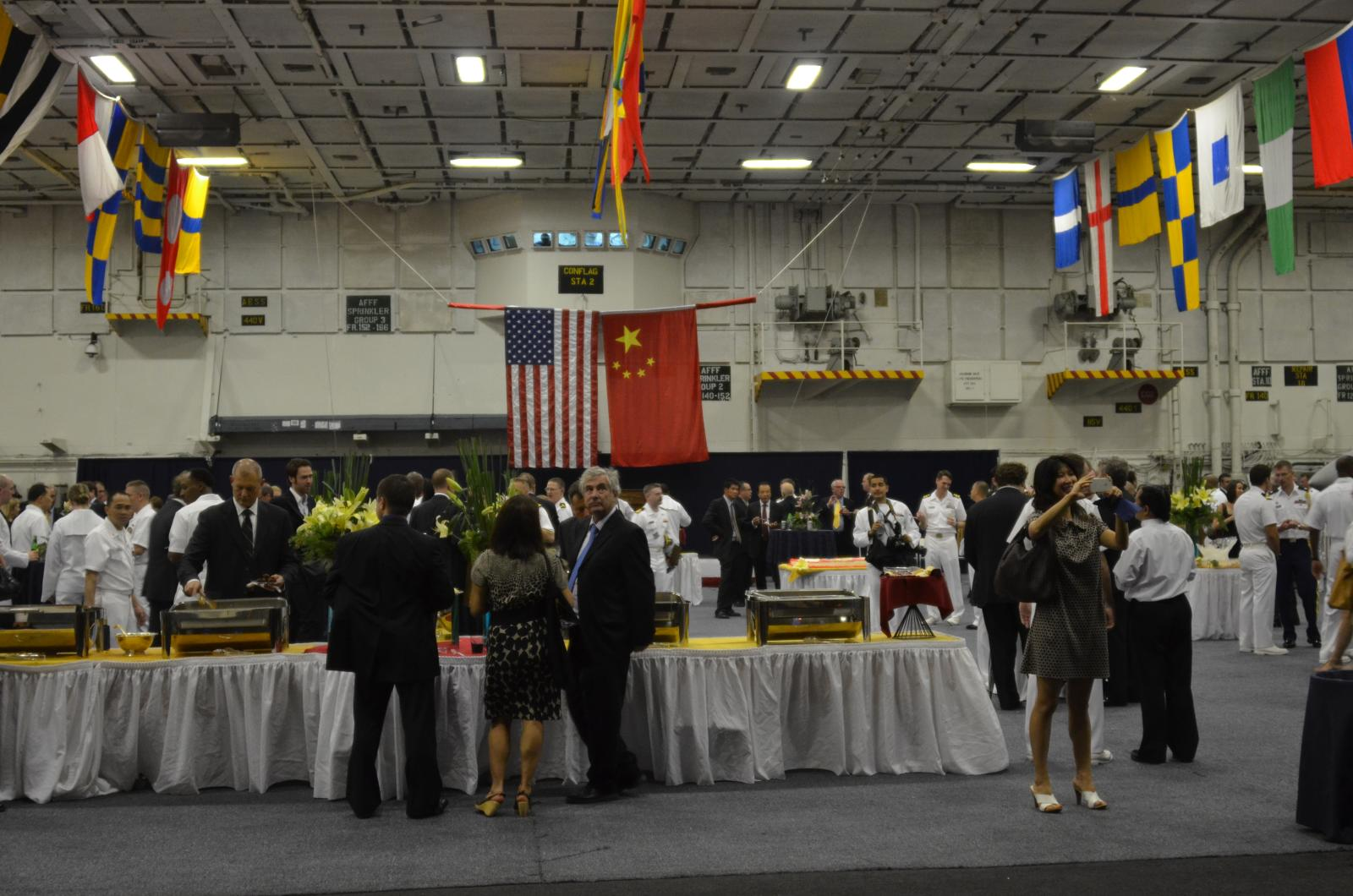
Interior of Carl Vinson

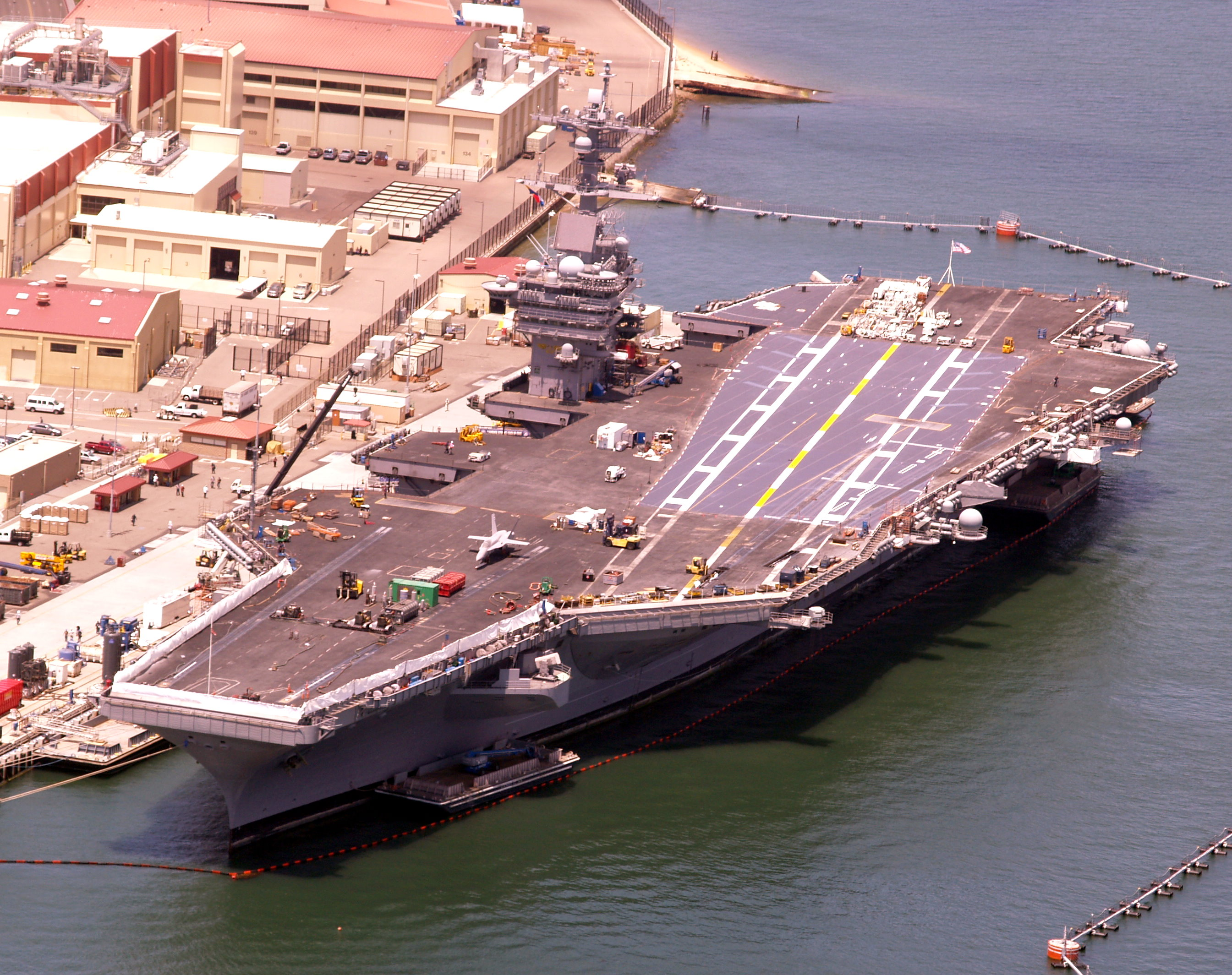
Carl Vinson in San Diego Bay, 2011

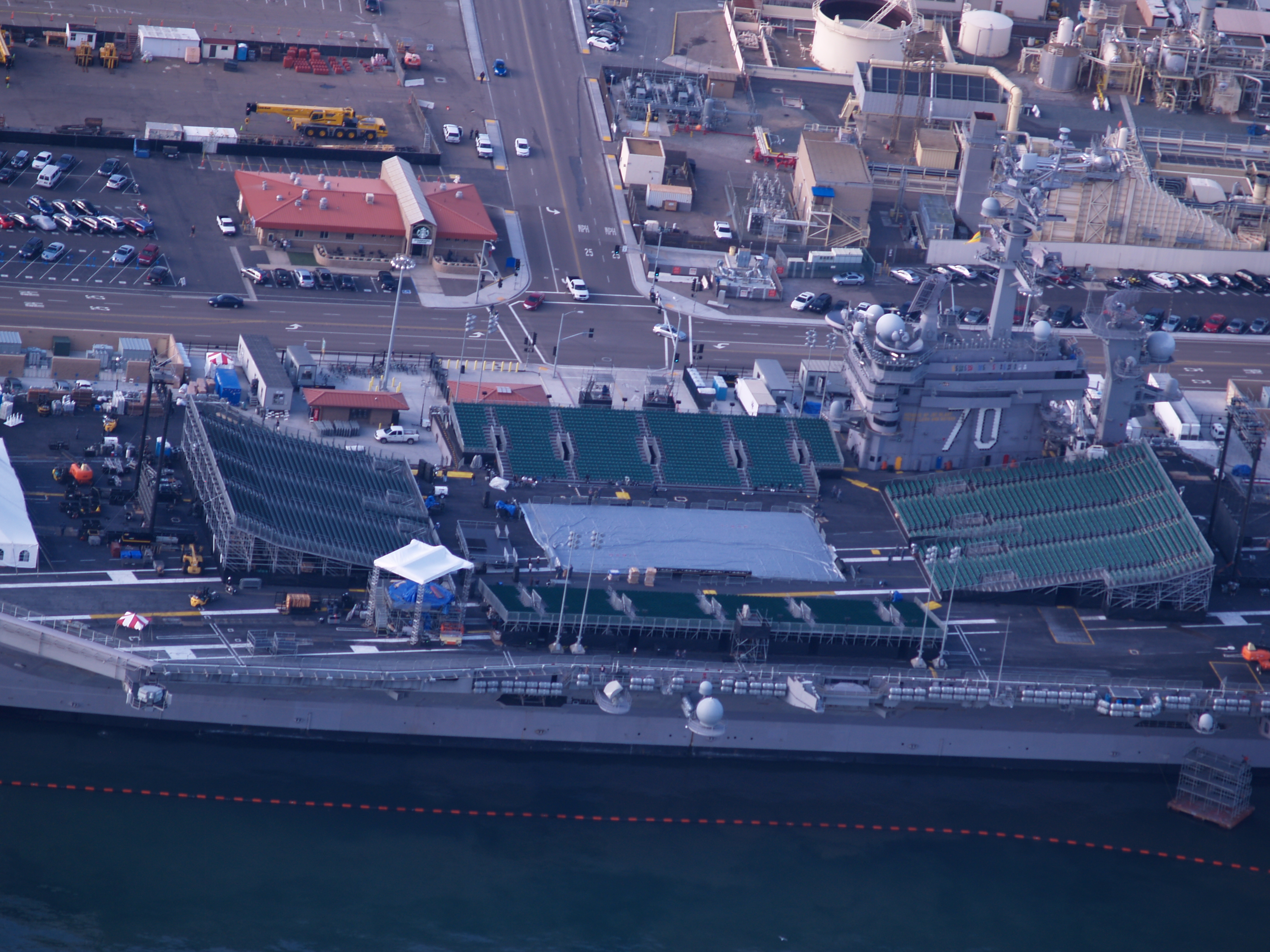
Deck of Carl Vinson set up for the Michigan State-North Carolina basketball game in 2011

On 12 January 2010, just hours after the 2010 Haiti earthquake, Carl Vinson was ordered to redirect from her current deployment in the North Atlantic Ocean to Haiti to contribute to the relief effort as part of Operation Unified Response. Upon receiving orders from USSOUTHCOM, the Carl Vinson battle group proceeded to Mayport, Florida where the ships loitered offshore to receive additional supplies and helicopters. The ships arrived off Port au Prince on 15 January 2010 to commence operations. CNN medical correspondent and neurosurgeon Sanjay Gupta, pediatric surgeon Henri Ford, and two Navy doctors removed a piece of concrete from the skull of a 12-year-old earthquake victim in an operation performed aboard Carl Vinson on 18 January. In addition to providing medical relief, the ship's excess desalination capacity was critical to providing water to Haiti's population during the earthquake relief.

In March 2010, during her transit around South America performed Gringo-Gaucho / Southern Seas 2010 maneuvers with the Argentine Navy.

On 12 April 2010, the carrier arrived at her new home port of Naval Air Station North Island, San Diego California.

On 30 November 2010, with Carrier Air Wing Seventeen embarked, Carl Vinson departed Naval Air Station North Island for a three-week composite training unit exercise (COMPTUEX) and her 2010–2011 deployment to the U.S. Seventh Fleet Area of Responsibility (AOR) in the Western Pacific and U.S. Fifth Fleet Areas of Responsibility in the Indian Ocean and Persian Gulf as part of Carrier Strike Group One. This is the first Western Pacific deployment for Carl Vinson in more than five years since the ship entered her Refueling Complex Overhaul (RCOH) in late 2005.

On 11 April 2011 while operating in the Arabian Sea, an F/A-18 Hornet suffered an engine fire immediately after launch from the carrier. The aircraft returned to the carrier with one engine and the fire was extinguished without any damage to the ship or any injuries to the pilot or ship crew members.

On 2 May 2011, following the death of Osama bin Laden, his body was brought aboard Carl Vinson, which was operating in the Northern Arabian Sea, and buried at sea following religious rites.

The ship docked in Manila Bay in the Philippines from 15 to 18 May 2011 for a "routine port call and goodwill visit" meant to "highlight the strong historic, community, and military connections between the United States and the Republic of the Philippines." Among those given a special tour of this aircraft carrier were Philippine President Benigno Aquino III and U.S. Ambassador to the Philippines Harry K. Thomas, Jr. This brief visit was criticized by cause-oriented group Bagong Alyansang Makabayan as well as Filipino youth leader Raymond Palatino and University of the Philippines political science professor Clarita Carlos.

The ship docked in Hong Kong in the People's Republic of China on 22 May 2011 to take on supplies for her return to homeport San Diego, and to provide photo opportunities to the Chinese press. The ship returned to San Diego on 15 June 2011.

On 21 June 2011, it was announced that the Michigan State Spartans would play a regular season men's basketball game against the North Carolina Tar Heels on the flight deck of Carl Vinson on Veterans Day. On 11 November 2011, the inaugural Carrier Classic took place at the Naval Air Station North Island on San Diego Bay in Coronado, California. U.S. President Barack Obama was one of 8,111 people in attendance as the Tar Heels defeated the Spartans by a score of 67–55.

On 30 November 2011, Carl Vinson departed Naval Air Station North Island, California, on her scheduled Western Pacific (WESTPAC) deployment.

During January 2012, Carl Vinson began her patrol of the Arabian Sea.

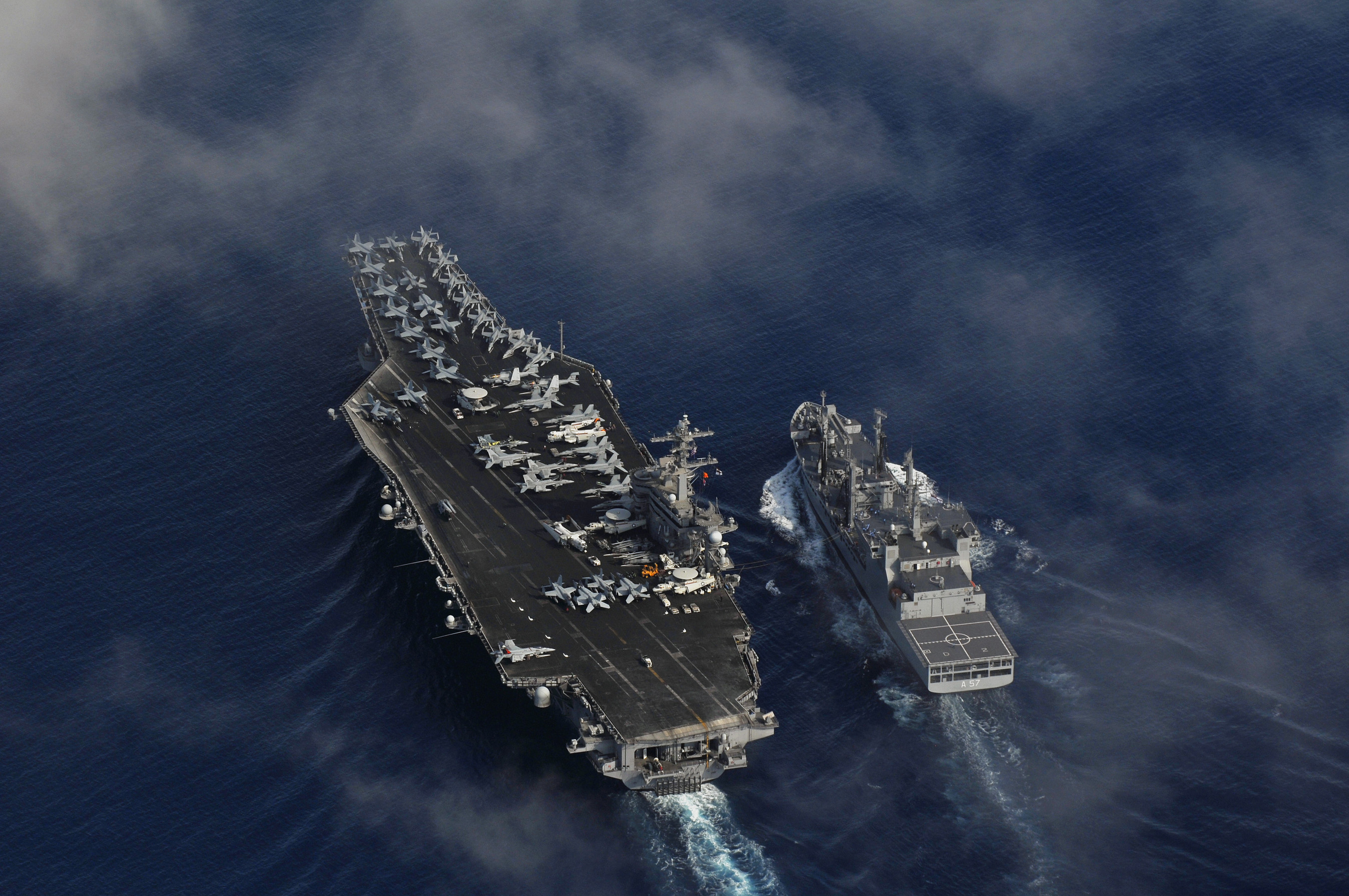
INS Shakti replenishing Carl Vinson during Malabar 2012.

While with the Seventh Fleet, between 9–16 April 2012, Carrier Strike Group One participated in Malabar 2012 with the Indian Navy its Western Pacific deployment.

On 23 May 2012, Carl Vinson returned to Naval Air Station North Island, California, to end her November 2011 deployment. The carrier had stopped earlier in Hawaii to pick up approximately 900 "Tigers" – friends and family of the sailors aboard the ship who traveled with the ship from Hawaii to San Diego.

On 5 July 2012, Carl Vinson began preparations for a Planned Incremental Availability (PIA) period. PIA is a major maintenance phase that all American naval vessels must go through multiple times throughout their lifetime to be able to sustain underway operations. PIA 2012–2013 for Carl Vinson included overhauls of over 40 crew living spaces, 30 heads and hundreds of workspaces throughout the ship. Also included were upgrades to many of the electronics and defense systems that the ship uses during deployments, to include an upgrade from the Global Command and Control System-Maritime (GCCS-M) to the Distributed Common Ground System-Navy (DCGS-N).

On 30 January 2013, Carl Vinson commenced sea trials, marking her first time underway in seven months, since the ammo offload which ended on 29 June 2012. Upon returning from this underway period, the ship's commanding officer, then Captain Kent D. Whalen, announced on 2 February 2013 that PIA had officially ended, marking the first on-time PIA completion since 1999. Since February 2013, the ship has been underway multiple times conducting carrier qualifications with Carrier Air Wing Seventeen as well as multiple crew certification exercises. The most recent accomplishment for Carl Vinson was the completion of her evaluation of nuclear reactor operation. During this evaluation, the Naval Sea Systems Command embarks a team of proctors who put the ship's Reactor Department through a multitude of drills and exercises to test their ability to safely operate a nuclear reactor and to contain any casualty of the reactor as it occurs.island This was completed on 1 July 2013.

F-18 take-off, in-flight refueling and landing on USS Carl Vinson, 2014

On 22 August 2014, Carl Vinson and assigned CVW-17 began a scheduled deployment to the U.S. 5th and 7th Fleet areas of responsibility. USS Bunker Hill, Destroyer Squadron 1 and its ships USS Gridley, USS Sterett, and USS Dewey deployed with the carrier as part of the Carl Vinson Carrier Strike Group (CSG). The carrier was deployed to the Persian Gulf to relieve USS George H. W. Bush in fighting the Islamic State of Iraq and the Levant.

On 11 September 2014 at 17:40 hrs local time, two F/A-18Cs from CVW-17 crashed in the western Pacific Ocean whilst operating from Carl Vinson. The carrier was in her area of operations in the Indo-Asia-Pacific region. The planes were attached to Strike Squadron 94 and Strike Fighter Squadron 113 and collided 7 miles (11 km) from the carrier, an area approximately 290 miles (470 km) west of Wake Island. USS Bunker Hill, USS Gridley, USS Sterett, USS Dewey, and helicopters assigned to Helicopter Sea Combat Squadron 15 (HSC 15) and Helicopter Maritime Strike Squadron 73 (HSM 73) assisted in the search for the pilots. Whilst one pilot was recovered alive soon after the crash, the second pilot could not be located. The Navy continued its search for the second pilot until 13 September 2014, when the search was abandoned.

Carl Vinson returned to San Diego on 4 June 2015. Over the course of the deployment, supporting strike operations in Iraq and Syria, CVW-17 successfully flew 12,300 sorties, including 2,382 combat missions and dropped more than half a million pounds (230 tons) of ordnance against ISIS.

On 14 August 2015, Carl Vinson began a planned incremental availability (PIA) period at Naval Air Station North Island. The ship received more than $300 million worth of improvements over six months during this modernisation, including the first UAV command center installed aboard an aircraft carrier.

In 2016, Carrier Air Wing Two was reassigned to Carl Vinson. The carrier began her next scheduled deployment to the Western Pacific with CVW-2 on 5 January 2017.

In mid February 2017, it was reported that the Carl Vinson CSG commenced "routine operations" in the South China Sea. During the first half of April 2017, after conducting training exercises with the Republic of Korea Navy in the Western Pacific, the CSG was reportedly ordered towards the Korean Peninsula amid growing concerns about North Korea's ballistic missile program. "We are sending an armada," President Donald Trump announced on 12 April 2017, sending a signal to deter North Korea after missile and nuclear provocations.However, the Carl Vinson and her escorts were 3,500 miles (5,600 km) away, undertaking joint exercises with the Royal Australian Navy in the Indian Ocean south of Singapore. Confusion appeared to stem from a "glitch-ridden sequence of events" that included a premature announcement of the deployment from the Navy.

On 5 January 2018, Carl Vinson left San Diego for her next scheduled deployment to the Western Pacific. On 5 March 2018, the ship entered Da Nang Port, alongside USS Lake Champlain and USS Wayne E. Meyer, on a scheduled visit to Vietnam. This visit was planned from when President Donald Trump was on a state visit to Vietnam. U.S. Navy sailors on the ships engaged in cultural activities and training with the Vietnamese Navy. This visit was hoped to "increase the relations between the two countries." Carl Vinson returned to San Diego on 12 April 2018. In July 2018, Carl Vinson participated in exercise RIMPAC 2018.

On 2 August 2018, it was announced that Carl Vinson will move from San Diego to Naval Base Kitsap to go through a period of maintenance at Puget Sound and USS Abraham Lincoln will replace Carl Vinson at San Diego.

=== 2020s ===
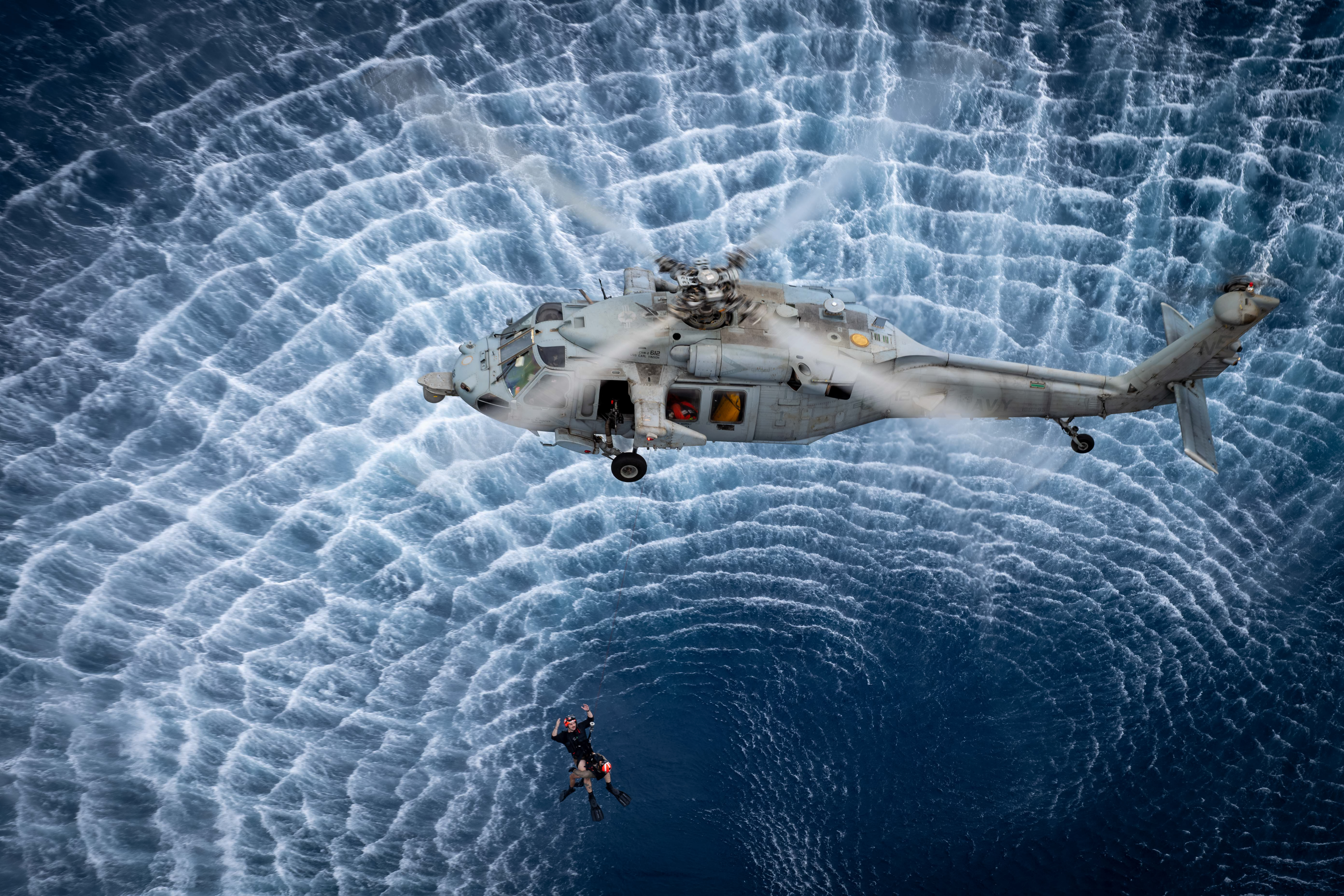
Sailors assigned to USS Carl Vinson conduct search and rescue training with an MH-60S Seahawk assigned to Helicopter Sea Combat Squadron 4, in the Celebes Sea. (February 2025)

On 8 January 2020, it was announced that Carl Vinson will be changing home port back to San Diego bringing the number of San Diego–based carriers from two to three, joining Theodore Roosevelt and Abraham Lincoln.

The COVID-19 pandemic was reported to have spread to the crew of Carl Vinson when its first case was reported on 23 March 2020. At the time, the ship was in dry dock for maintenance at Puget Sound Naval Shipyard, and it was reported that "the sailor did not board the vessel and had no contact with any shipyard personnel."

On 2 September 2020, Carl Vinson arrived in her new homeport of San Diego following a 17-month overhaul at Puget Sound Naval Shipyard. Carl Vinson left San Diego for her next deployment on 3 August 2021, with CVW-2 embarked. One of the squadrons assigned to CVW-2 was Strike Fighter Squadron 147 (VFA-147). This was the first operational deployment of a U.S. Navy squadron equipped with the F-35C Lightning II.

On 24 January 2022, while Carl Vinson was operating in the South China Sea, an F-35C with VFA-147 crashed while landing, resulting in injuries to at least seven crew members. The pilot safely ejected and was recovered from the water shortly after. The pilot and two of the injured deck crew were taken to a hospital in Manila, Philippines for treatment, while the remaining injured were treated in the carrier's medical facilities. The wreck of the F-35C was lost over the edge into the sea after the incident. 37 days after the incident, the plane was recovered.

Carl Vinson participated in the RIMPAC 2024 exercise. On 29 December 2024, Carl Vinson made a port visit to Port Klang, Malaysia. On 26 January 2025, Carl Vinson then made a port visit to Pattaya, Thailand.

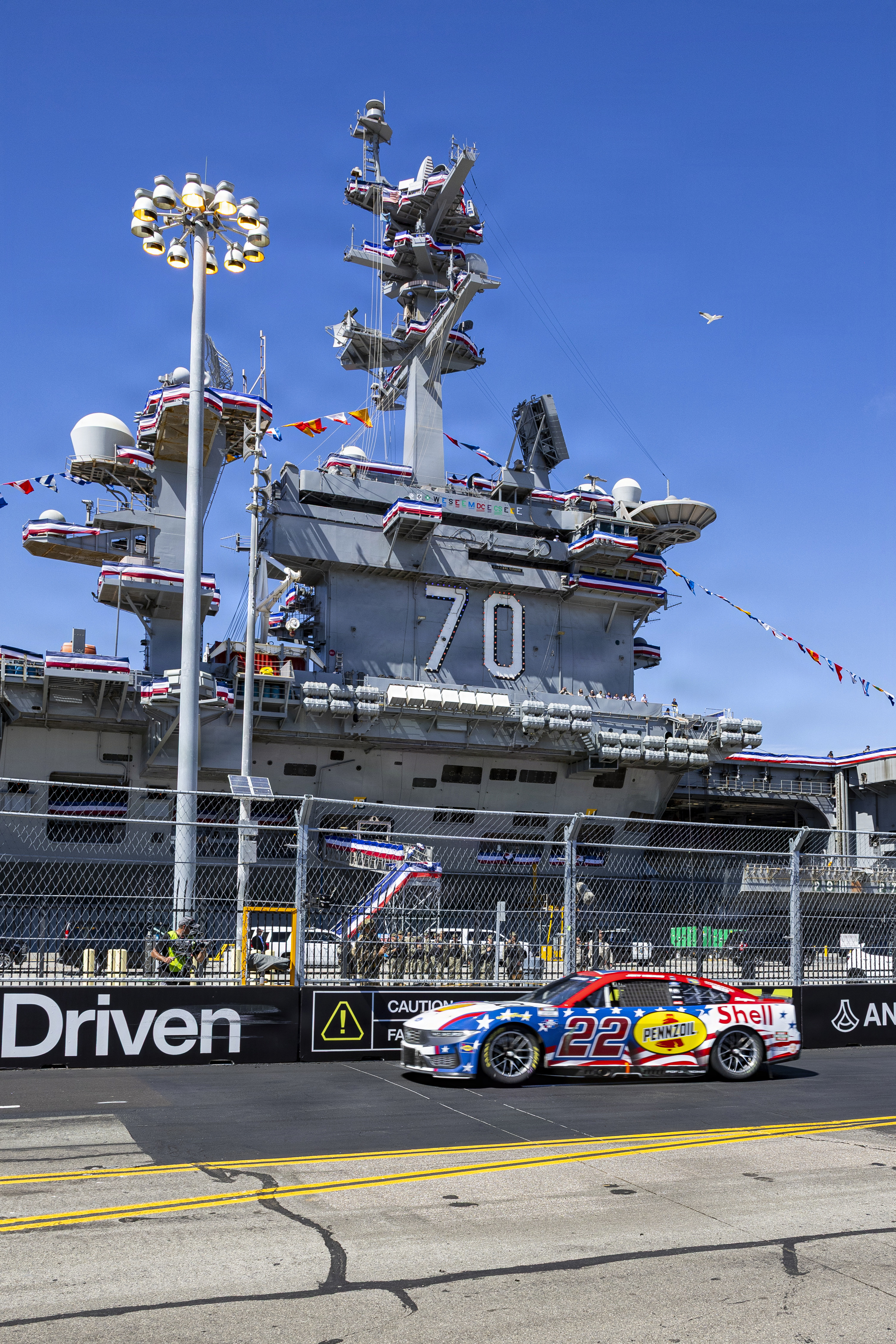
NASCAR driver Joey Logano racing past Carl Vinson in the 2026 Anduril 250. The ship was part of the Coronado Street Course's "Carrier Corner" while the bridge served as a commentary booth for the race.

In February 2025, Carl Vinson participated in the week-long Exercise PACIFIC STELLAR 2025, a "multi-large-deck event (MLDE)", along with the French Carrier Strike Group and the Japanese destroyer JS Kaga before heading to Busan, South Korea in early March 2025. After a short port call in Guam, Carl Vinson earned the Combat Action Ribbon for providing combat support in the Red Sea against the Houthis. On 14 August 2025, she returned to her home port of San Diego after a nine-month deployment.

== Awards ==
Carl Vinson has received many awards, including:

- Combat Action Ribbon – 2025
- Battle Efficiency Award – 1990, 1996, 1998, 2001, 2004, 2011, 2015, 2018, 2024, 2025
- Navy Unit Commendation – 1998, 2001
- Meritorious Unit Commendation – 1985, 1995, 1996, 1999, 2012
- National Defense Service Medal (2 Awards)
- Armed Forces Expeditionary Medal
- Global War on Terrorism Expeditionary Medal (Multiple Awards)
- Humanitarian Service Medal – 2021
- Sea Service Deployment Ribbon (15 Awards)
- Vice Admiral James H. Flatley Memorial Safety Award – 1985, 1988, 1994, 1996
- Marjorie Sterrett Battleship Fund Award – 2004

== Overhauls ==
- August 1982 to December 1982 – Post Shakedown Availability – SPS-49 search radar replaces SPS-43
- October 1983 to January 1984 – Selected Restricted Availability
- January 1986 to March 1986 – Selected Restricted Availability – forward port sponson changed/enlarged
- March 1987 to August 1987 – Selected Restricted Availability
- September 1990 to April 1993 – Complex Overhaul – aft boarding dock added
- October 1994 to February 1995 – Selected Restricted Availability
- March 1997 to September 1997 – Planned Incremental Availability – bridle catcher removed
- October 1999 to September 2000 – Planned Incremental Availability
- March 2002 to September 2002 – Planned Incremental Availability
- November 2005 to July 2009 – Refueling and Complex Overhaul – top two levels of island replaced; new antenna mast; new radar tower; 2 RAM replace 1 CIWS/1 Mk-29 at forward port sponson/aft starboard sponson; 2 aft CIWS removed. Ship Self Defense System (SSDS) and Cooperative Engagement Systems installed.
- September 2009 to December 2009 – Post Shakedown Availability
- July 2012 to February 2013 – Planned Incremental Availability – CIWS replaced on aft port sponson
- July 2013 Upgraded the SPS-48E to the SPS-48G radar
- August 2015 to April 2016 – Planned Incremental Availability – 4 Mk-38 added (2 on small bow sponsons, one on stern on old CIWS sponson and one starboard ahead of elevator four).
- February 2019 to August 2020 – Planned Incremental Availability

== In popular culture ==
The carrier appears in the 2026 Apple TV film Mayday, in which U.S. Navy lieutenant Troy Kelly declares an emergency and requests a ready deck before arriving aboard Carl Vinson.

== See also ==
- List of aircraft carriers
- List of aircraft carriers of the United States Navy
- Modern US Navy carrier air operations
- Carrier Strike Group One
