= Henri Ford =

Haitian-American pediatric surgeon

Henri R. Ford
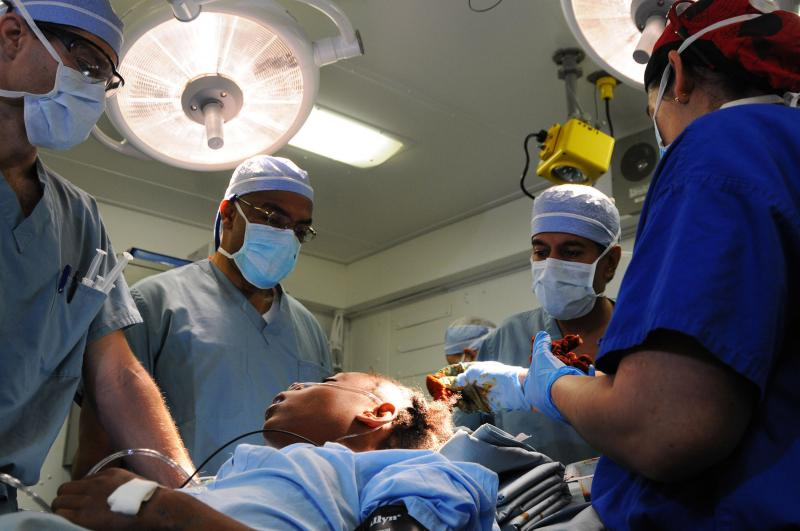
- Ford (second from left) and Sanjay Gupta (third from left) operate on a 12-year-old girl
- Education: Princeton University (BA) Harvard Medical School (MD) University of Southern California (MHA)
- Known for: Dean of University of Miami's Miller School of Medicine
- Medical career
- Profession: Pediatric Surgeon
- Research: Pathogenesis of Necrotizing enterocolitis (NEC)

Henri Ronald Ford is a Haitian-American pediatric surgeon. He previously served as chief of surgery at Children's Hospital Los Angeles and Vice Dean for Medical Education at the Keck School of Medicine of the University of Southern California.

In 2018, he was appointed dean of the Miller School of Medicine at the University of Miami. Following the 2010 Haiti earthquake, Ford returned to Haiti to provide medical assistance to earthquake victims.

In 2026, he was elected to the American Philosophical Society.

== Early life and education ==
Ford was born in Haiti and spent his early years in Port-au-Prince. His father was a preacher who spoke out against inequality in Haitian society. When Henri was 13 years old, he fled with his family from the government of Papa Doc Duvalier, settling among the Haitian community in Brooklyn, New York. Ford graduated from John Jay High School despite speaking no English when he first arrived.

Ford graduated with an A.B. from the Woodrow Wilson School of Public and International Affairs at Princeton University in 1980 after completing a 144-page long senior thesis titled "In search of Refuge: Profile of the Haitian Community in Princeton." He received an M.D. from Harvard Medical School in 1984. He completed his surgical internship and residency at Weill Cornell Medical College. He also completed a research fellowship in immunology at the University of Pittsburgh School of Medicine's Department of Surgery.

In 2009, Ford received a Master of Health Administration degree from the School of Policy, Planning, and Development at the University of Southern California.

== Career ==
From 1993 to 2005, Ford was an attending surgeon at the Children's Hospital of Pittsburgh (CHP) and on the faculty of the University of Pittsburgh School of Medicine. He was surgeon-in-chief at CHP and chief of the division of pediatric surgery at the medical school. In 2005 he became vice president and chief of surgery at Children's Hospital Los Angeles (CHLA) and joined the faculty of the Keck School of Medicine of USC. Ford later said he moved to East Los Angeles to serve a population in greater need than the Pittsburgh population and that he turned down a large salary increase Pitt offered to retain him. He was appointed Vice Dean for Medical Education at the Keck School of Medicine of USC in 2008. He is currently president of the American Pediatric Surgical Association (APSA), and he was awarded one of the rarest and most prestigious international milestones for a surgeon—an Honorary Fellowship to the Royal College of Surgeons of England (RCSEng), the organization's highest award. In 2018, he was named dean of the University of Miami's Miller School of Medicine.

=== Research and affiliations ===
Ford has done groundbreaking research on the pathogenesis of necrotizing enterocolitis. According to CHLA, he has written over 300 research publications. He served as President of the Association for Academic Surgery from 2002 to 2003 and is the immediate past President of the Society of Black Academic Surgeons, having served in that post 2010–11. He is a fellow of the American Association for the Surgery of Trauma, the American Academy of Pediatrics, and the American College of Surgeons. Since July 2010, he has been a Trustee of Princeton University.

=== Work in Haiti ===
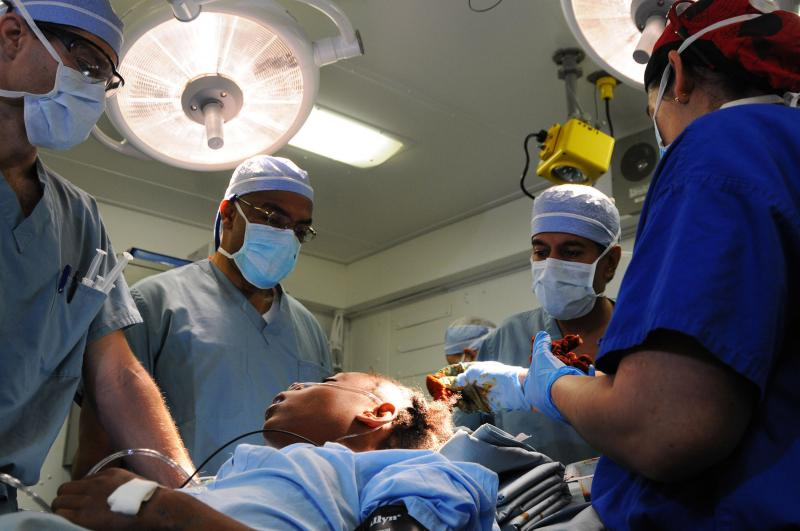
Ford (second from left) with Sanjay Gupta (third from left) Jerry Berman (far left) and a U.S. Navy doctor operating on a twelve-year-old girl aboard the USS Carl Vinson in January 2011

In 1997, Ford made his first visit to Haiti following his family's escape. He later described being horrified by the abject poverty and the poor conditions at Hôpital Albert Schweitzer Haiti. He returned several times in the 1990s as a visiting doctor.

After his sister called the conditions in Haiti following the 2010 Haiti earthquake, "apocalyptic", Ford contacted a friend at the U.S. State Department to offer help. By 16 January he was in Haiti with the U.S. government's emergency rescue team. His brothers Billy Ford and Jean Ford, also doctors, soon joined him in Haiti to treat earthquake victims.

Ford operated on patients in a closet at the U.S. Embassy, but when one boy's injuries proved too serious to treat there he and the boy flew by helicopter to the USS Carl Vinson. After operating on the boy, Ford remained aboard the Carl Vinson treating other pediatric patients. In one case, he removed a piece of concrete from a girl's skull with the help of Jerry Berman, a U.S. Navy doctor, and Sanjay Gupta, a neurosurgeon and CNN medical correspondent.

After returning to land, Ford helped the Haitian Group for the Study of Kaposi Sarcoma and Opportunistic Infections (GHESKIO) set up a field hospital at the soccer field on the campus of Université Quisqueya in Port-au-Prince. He treated patients at the field hospital and spread word about it in the streets of Port-au-Prince, recruiting patients and health care workers from the population. Referring to his work for the GHESKIO hospital, Weill Cornell Medical College called Ford "invaluable", saying he "served both as a skilled surgeon and as a bridge between the United States and Haitian medical teams." WebMD named Ford and three others, including Gupta, "Haiti Health Heroes".

Ford spent two weeks in Haiti during his initial visit following the earthquake. He returned eight times within a year of the quake to continue his medical work.
