= The SafePoint Trust =

The Safepoint Trust is a UK registered charity, no. 1119073, that focuses on injection safety. Its aim is to educate people, worldwide, to ensure that the billions of medical injections given each year are given safely. The charity was founded by the inventor Marc Koska, OBE in 2006.
