= Damyanti Gupta =

Indian-born American engineer

Damyanti Gupta is an Indian-born American engineer who was the first woman engineer with a postgraduate degree at the Ford Motor Company. She was recognized by Time Magazine in their collection of firsts as the "First degreed female engineer at Ford."

== Early life ==
Damyanti Gupta was born in India on May 10, 1942, during the British rule of India. The partition of India happened during her childhood, and the place where she and her family resided became a part of Pakistan. The partition resulted in unrest and riots. Gupta and her family left their hometown, Tharushah, Sindh, overnight in a cargo ship and settled in Mumbai.

As refugees, the Guptas had to start over in a new place. However, Gupta's mother, Gopibai Hingorani, had great ambitions for her daughter. She had only studied until 4th grade, but she told Damyanti that she wanted to give her something that could not be taken away: an education.

== Education ==
Gupta's interest in engineering sparked at the age of 13, when Prime Minister Jawaharlal Nehru visited the town where Damyanti lived. During his visit, he spoke about the need for industry and subsequently, the need for male and female engineers following Britain's 200 year rule in India.

Gupta enrolled in engineering college and became the first female admitted for engineering at that school. As the first female engineering student, she faced many challenges. The campus did not have a women's restroom; Gupta would have to bike over a mile and half each way to use a restroom. Once the dean realized this, a ladies restroom was built on campus. Gupta went on to graduate first in her class.

At the age of 19, Gupta came across a book on Henry Ford that inspired her to one day work for the company.

After earning her bachelor's degree in Mechanical Engineering in 1965, Gupta went to Germany for work. In 1966, she moved to the United States to pursue a master's degree in Mechanical Engineering at Oklahoma State University. She became the first female to graduate from Oklahoma State University with an advanced degree in engineering.

== Career ==
After completing her master's degree, Gupta applied to work at Ford in Dearborn, Michigan but was initially rejected by a manager who did not want a woman engineer on his team. She tried again later and was successful. Initially, Human Resources was unsure if Gupta was going for the engineering role, since the company did not have any female engineers at the time. Gupta was persistent and commented that if the company did not give her a chance, they would never have any female engineers. She landed the job and became the first female engineer to work at Ford.

When the United Automobile Workers went on strike, there were layoffs at Ford Motor Company. Gupta survived the layoffs; however, she experienced subtle racism from those who were impacted.

When Gupta was pregnant with her first baby, her manager asked her not to come to work once she started showing. After giving birth, she returned to work in a different position at Ford and was promoted just three months later.

Gupta spent 34 years of her career at Ford. She retired in 2002.

== Personal life ==
Damyanti is married to Subhash Gupta. They have two children, Sanjay Gupta and Suneel Gupta. Sanjay Gupta, a practicing neurosurgeon and CNN's Chief Medical Correspondent, highlights his mother as a strong and powerful woman who has had a great influence on his life.
