= Marc Koska =

British businessman

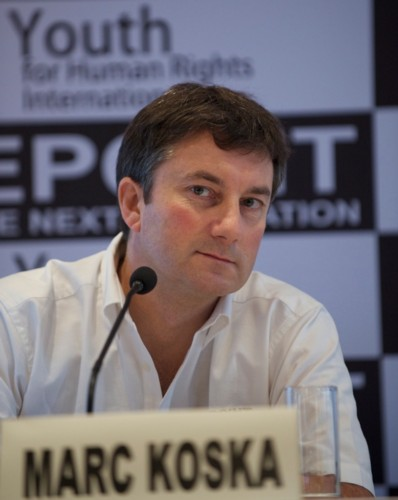
- Koska in 2008
- Born: Marc Andrew Koska; 14 March 1961 (age 64); Bournemouth, England
- Education: Stowe School
- Occupation: Inventor
- Spouse: Anna Koska
- Children: 3
- Website: www.marckoska.com

Marc Andrew Koska OBE (born 14 March 1961) is best known for inventing the non-reusable K1 auto-disable syringe, thus preventing the medical transmission of blood-borne diseases.

== Education ==
Koska attended Stowe School, a boarding independent school for boys (now co-educational), in the village of Stowe (near Buckingham), in Buckinghamshire.

== Life and career ==
=== K1 Syringe ===
In 1984 Koska read a newspaper article predicting the transmission of HIV through the reuse of needles and syringes. In order to find a solution, he studied how drug addicts used syringes in the UK, went to Geneva to learn about Public Health Policy, visited several syringe factories, studied plastic injection moulding, and read everything available on the transmission of viruses like HIV.

After a year of intense study, Koska concluded that syringe manufacture was the key to the problem. Koska designed a syringe (K1) that could be made on existing equipment with a small modification. It was made from the same materials and could be used in the same way as a normal syringe so that healthcare professionals would not have to retrain. K1 syringes cannot be used again so the next patient will also have a sterile and safe injection.

Koska recognised that new syringes were only one part of the solution. One must also teach the public about the dangers of reusing needles. In 2005 Koska founded The SafePoint Trust, a registered charity dedicated to educating children about this issue.

On 23 July 2009, Koska gave a lecture on his invention to TED Oxford:

=== 2008 India campaign ===
In November 2008, Koska and a SafePoint Trust team led a major media and public-awareness campaign throughout India in an attempt to do something about the prevalence of unsafe injections and the resultant illness and death that they cause in that country. They travelled throughout India giving their One Injection, One Syringe message to the media at press conferences for over a week. In addition, a specially made PSA entitled Sachin (in both English and Hindi) was repeatedly shown on television channels, radio stations and cinemas across the country. Watch the Sachin PSA in English; Sachin PSA in Hindi. As a result, SafePoint's message achieved widespread coverage throughout India.

Koska then met with Anbumani Ramadoss, India's State Minister for Health, who decided to outlaw the use of ordinary syringes, making auto-disable syringes mandatory – initially in Central Government Hospitals with regional State-controlled facilities to follow and, later, in private hospitals as part of a second phase – throughout the whole of India.

Making the Point is a SafePoint-produced video report on the campaign, culminating in Dr Ramadoss's landmark decision.

Koska's SafePoint team is currently planning to target Africa next.

=== ApiJect Systems Corporation ===
In 2018, Marc Koska and Jay Walker co-founded ApiJect Systems, a medical technology company that creates single-use plastic injectors.

== Personal life ==
As of 2001, Koska lives in East Sussex, England, with his wife Anna Koska and their three children.
