= LabTV =

Online medical research hub

- Type: Private
- Founded: 2004
- Founder: Jay Walker
- Headquarters: Stamford, CT
- Key people: Evan Walker, CEO; David Hoffman, Exec. Producer
- Website: labtv.com (US)

LabTV is an online hub where people, labs, and organizations engaged in medical research come together to tell their stories. LabTV has filmed hundreds of medical researchers at dozens of institutions across the United States, including dozens at the National Institutes of Health.

== Brief history ==
LabTV is a private company that was founded in 2013 by entrepreneur Jay Walker as a way to help get more students to consider a career in medical research. In 2014, Mr. Walker and LabTV’s executive producer David Hoffman received Disruptor Innovation Awards at the 2014 Tribeca Film Festival for LabTV’s work in getting university students around the country to create short personal interviews of National Institutes of Health-funded medical researchers.

Winners of the LabTV contest included student filmmakers from Columbia University, the University of Delaware, Cornell University, University of Hawaii, University of Pennsylvania, Tufts University, George Washington University, the University of Virginia, The University of Chicago, and the University of Georgia among others. LabTV continues to film medical researchers at dozens of universities and organizations, including the National Institutes of Health and Georgetown University

== See also ==
- National Institutes of Health
- Medical research
