= Walker Digital =

Walker Digital LLC
- Type: Private
- Industry: Research & Development
- Founded: Stamford, Connecticut, U.S. (1994)
- Founder: Jay S. Walker
- Headquarters: Stamford, Connecticut, U.S.
- Website: www.walkerdigital.com

Walker Digital is a privately held American research and development lab based in Stamford, Connecticut. It was founded in 1994 by Jay S. Walker, who also holds the position of chairman as of 2011. The company specializes in creating applications and business solutions that work with large-scale networks such as cell phones and the Internet. Walker Digital and its principals partner with Fortune 500 firms such as Time Warner and International Game Technology to bring its inventions to market. It also licenses other companies to do so. Walker Digital is considered a "non-practicing entity" or patent troll because it does not create products itself, instead of relying on lawsuits to generate revenue.

Walker Digital LLC is the parent company of Walker Digital Management, Walker Digital Lottery, Walker Digital Gaming and Walker Digital Table Systems. In 2011, several Walker Digital executives purchased TEDMED, the annual conference on the future of health and medicine.

== Inventions and Business Launches ==
=== U.S. HomeGuard ===
In 2003, Walker Digital devised an Internet-based surveillance system called U.S. HomeGuard. The basic concept was to hire 1 million work-at-home employees who would log in over the Internet to provide constant surveillance of image feeds from some 47,000 security cameras. These webcams would be installed nationwide at security-sensitive sites including border crossings, water reservoirs, chemical plants, nuclear power generators, airports, etc. Observers would report any suspicious activity to the U.S. Department of Homeland Security within 30 seconds.

The Atlantic reported that Walker Digital invested several million dollars developing a prototype, offering the sell the system to the U.S. government for $1. Estimating that a test would cost $40 million, Walker said he was prepared to raise private funds for this purpose. On the recommendation of then-Rep. Christopher Shays (R-Conn.), Walker held numerous meetings with White House and DHS officials but the U.S. declined to go forward with the project.

=== Partnership with IGT ===
In 2006, Walker Digital entered into a strategic partnership with International Game Technology (IGT), a manufacturer of slot machines. The first result of the partnership was Guaranteed Play, a method for casino game players to purchase gameplay. Customers receive a fixed number of slot machine spins or blackjack hands, known as a "session" of play, at a discounted price, by paying in advance.

In 2010, Walker Digital sold approximately 100 patents to IGT, concluding the partnership.

=== Perfect Pay Baccarat ===
In 2009, Walker Digital subsidiary Walker Digital Gaming (now known as Walker Digital Table Systems) introduced the Perfect Pay baccarat table. This system utilizes RFID in an attempt to track baccarat wagers, hand outcomes, payouts and player ratings in real-time, while eliminating losses from dealer mis-pays, counterfeit chips and other problems.

== Patent lawsuits and disputes ==
Walker Digital has filed 53 patent infringement lawsuits.

In January 2001, the State of Connecticut Attorney General filed suit against Walker Digital. Faced with mounting financial losses, Jay Walker fired 106 of his 125 employees, violating Federal employment law requiring 60 days notice when laying off more than 33% of the workforce. On September 4, 2002, Walker Digital settles for $275,000 to be split amongst the laid-off employees.

In October 15, 2009 Walker Digital, LLC filed its first patent infringement action. The suit against Microsoft, Hewlett-Packard, and Dell, Inc., was decided on January 3, 2011 as non-infringed.

In November 2010 Walker Digital LLC sued Facebook for friending, or "Method and system for establishing and maintaining user-controlled anonymous communications".

On April 11, 2011 Walker Digital filed 15 lawsuits against more than 100 defendants including Amazon, Google and Microsoft for unauthorized use of its intellectual properties.

On September 3, 2014, in a lawsuit against Google, two Walker Digital patents were found to be invalid for lacking patentable subject matter.
