= Marc Hodosh =

American entrepreneur

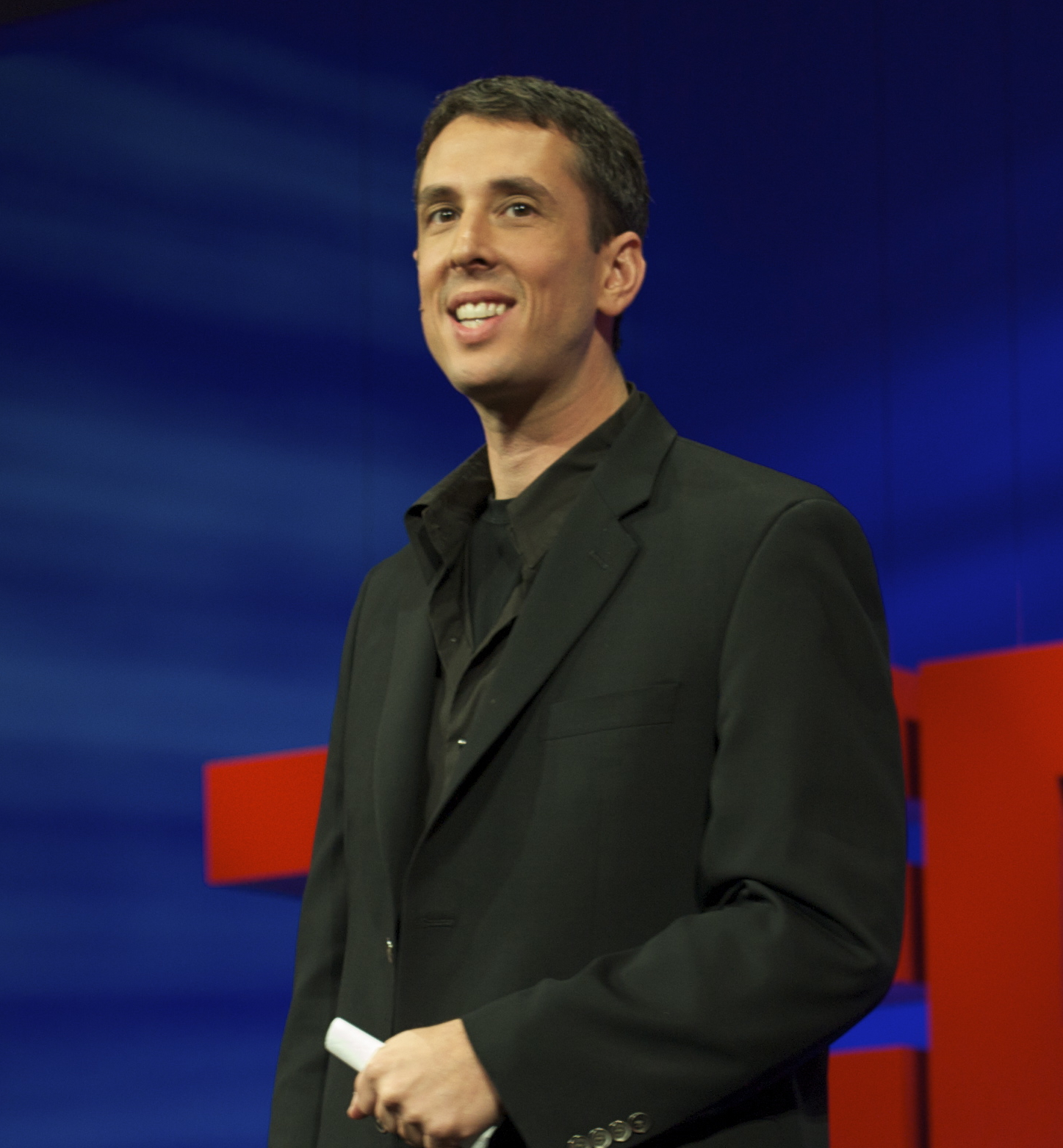
- Hodosh hosting TEDMED in 2011 in San Diego, CA.
- Born: December 25, 1972 (age 53)
- Education: Ithaca College, Boston University

Marc Hodosh (/ˈhoʊdɒʃ/ HOH-dosh; born December 25, 1972) is an American entrepreneur who formerly owned, co-created and hosted the TEDMED conference. In September 2019, Marc Hodosh and Dr. Sanjay Gupta (CNN’s Chief Medical Correspondent) announced a new event called Life Itself, set to launch in 2021 in partnership with CNN. Both Gupta and Hodosh will serve as hosts and organizers.

Hodosh previously led the Archon Genomics X PRIZE, which followed the Ansari Space X PRIZE. He has been a consultant to inventor Dean Kamen at DEKA Research & Development and also chaired Kamen's FIRST Robotics competition within the Boston region.

Earlier, Hodosh founded and sold ID One, which specialized in facial recognition technology for the US Military and Intelligence communities. He also led business development at Viisage, a previously publicly traded, facial recognition company. Hodosh's first business and entrepreneurial endeavors began by inventing and importing a variety of consumer products from Asia, with distribution through Bed Bath & Beyond, QVC television, Toys-R-Us, and others.

== Early life ==
Hodosh graduated from Ithaca College. He moved to Boston in 1995 to attend Boston University Medical School but after a year instead decided to focus on inventing and patenting consumer products.

== TEDMED ==
Marc Hodosh bought the rights to TEDMED in 2008 from TED creator Richard Saul Wurman, although the TEDMED event had not taken place for many years. In 2009, Hodosh re-launched TEDMED at the Hotel del Coronado near San Diego, California, where it was held for the next three years and where Hodosh served as host. Wurman co-hosted the event with Hodosh for the first two years. In 2011, Hodosh sold TEDMED to Priceline founder, Jay Walker, who later moved the event to The Kennedy Center in Washington, DC in April 2012.
