= TEDMED =

Annual conference on health and medicine

- Type: LLC
- Founder: Marc Hodosh and Richard Saul Wurman
- Headquarters: Stamford, Connecticut, U.S.
- Website: www.tedmed.com

TEDMED is an annual conference focusing on health and medicine, with a year-round web-based community. TEDMED is an independent event operating under license from the nonprofit TED conference.

== Background ==
As of 2014, TEDMED staff operates from Stamford, Connecticut.

Talks given at TEDMED combine "the nexus of health, information and technology" with "compelling personal stories" and "a glimpse into the future of healthcare."

The intent of the conference has been described as "a gathering of geniuses" that brings together "some of the most innovative, thoughtful pioneers of healthcare technology, media, and entertainment into one big four-day 'dinner party' to learn from one another and mix people up from different disciplines and industries to solve big problems in healthcare."

== History ==
TEDMED was founded in 1998 by TED's founder Richard Wurman. TEDMED was inactive for a number of years, and in 2008 Wurman sold the rights to TEDMED to entrepreneur Marc Hodosh. Hodosh recreated TEDMED and launched its first conference under his guidance in San Diego in October 2009.

In January 2010, TED.com began including videos of TEDMED talks on the TED website. In October 2010, TEDMED was held in San Diego again and sold out for a second year, attracting notable healthcare leaders and Hollywood celebrities.

In 2011, Jay Walker and a group of executives and investors purchased TEDMED from Hodosh for $16 million with future additional payments of as much as $9 million. The conference was then moved to Washington, DC.

In November 2016, TEDMED was held in Palm Springs, California.

== See also ==
- List of TED speakers
