= Shannon Watts =

American gun control activist (born 1971)

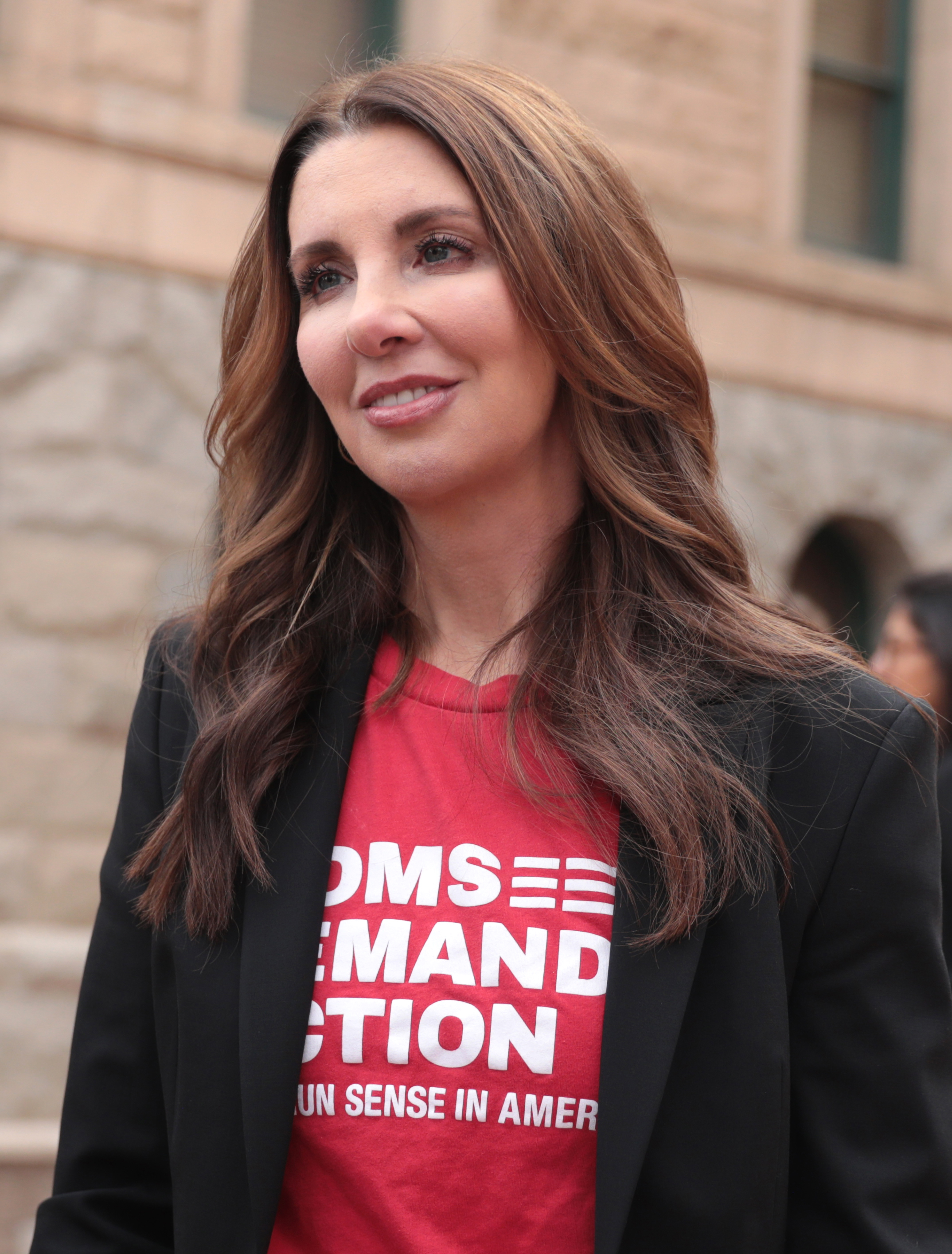
- Watts in 2023
- Born: January 1, 1971 (age 55); Rochester, New York, U.S.
- Occupation: University of Missouri (BA)
- Known for: Founder of Moms Demand Action
- Website: Official website

Shannon Watts (born January 1, 1971) is an American gun violence prevention activist and the founder of Moms Demand Action. Watts has campaigned for a number of political candidates across the country, including President Joe Biden. In 2016, Watts became a board member of Emerge America. Watts also serves on the board of Advance Peace.

== Early life and education ==
Watts was born in Rochester, New York, and graduated from the University of Missouri in 1994. After college, she worked in the Missouri House of Representatives and for former Governor Mel Carnahan. Watts then built a career as a communications executive, including FleishmanHillard, Monsanto, GE Healthcare and WellPoint. In 2008, she left her corporate career to focus on her family.

== Activism ==
=== Moms Demand Action ===
In December 2012, following the Sandy Hook Elementary School shooting, Watts started a Facebook group to unite women in support of gun control in the way Mothers Against Drunk Driving had advocated for raising the drinking age in the 1980s. The Facebook page grew into a grassroots movement after volunteers contacted Watts about forming Moms Demand Action chapters in their own communities. Moms Demand Action now has chapters in every state and over 6 million supporters nationwide. For over eight years, Moms Demand Action volunteers have stopped the NRA's priority legislation in statehouses more than 90 percent of the time, and helped pass hundreds of gun safety laws across the country, changed corporate policies, and educated Americans about secure gun storage. In the 2022 election, 140 Moms Demand Action volunteers were elected to public office.

Volunteers wear red t-shirts emblazoned with the Moms Demand Action logo to show their support and stand out at legislative hearings, protests and other events. In 2013, Moms Demand Action and Mayors Against Illegal Guns joined forces to become Everytown for Gun Safety. Watts has given speeches at places such as Valparaiso University and Mountain Calvary Lutheran Church. In January 2023, Watts announced that she would be stepping back from her leadership role at Moms Demand Action at the end of the year.

=== United Airlines ===
In 2017, Watts spoke out against United Airlines on Twitter after witnessing an agent deny boarding to two teenage girls wearing leggings in Denver International Airport. Watts added that the girls' father was allowed to board without incident, despite wearing shorts. United later stated that the two teenagers were pass riders under the airline's company travel perk program who were subject to a stricter dress code, whereas leggings or yoga pants are acceptable for regular passengers.

=== Politics ===
Watts is a member of the Democratic Party. She has been described as a "Midwestern, liberal, White woman" by The Washington Post, and a centrist by The Intercept.

In March 2020, she campaigned with presidential candidate Joe Biden in Ohio. In July 2024, Watts organized a Zoom call named "White Women: Answer the Call" to raise funds on behalf of the Kamala Harris presidential campaign. Around 200,000 supporters attended the call, including figures such as Pink, Glennon Doyle, Megan Rapinoe and Senator Kirsten Gillibrand. The event raised $11 million for the campaign. The Cut said the event "received backlash for its focus on such a privileged demographic."

In August 2025, Watts donated money to Gavin Newsom's California Proposition 50 campaign, saying, "I have been waiting for Democrats to meet the moment and to show some fight and to stand up to this administration that is so clearly wanting to be authoritarian." That October, she condemned an AI-generated advertisement by Andrew Cuomo's mayoral campaign that depicted "criminals for Zohran Mamdani", saying it was "so gross and full of racist stereotypes, including a Black man dressed like a pimp trafficking a car full of white women. Cuomo needs to be thrown in the ash heap of history."

Watts supported Haley Stevens in the Democratic primary for the 2026 U.S. Senate election in Michigan. In July 2026, she asserted that Abdul El-Sayed's criticisms of Stevens and Mallory McMorrow were "sexist", a characterization which The Intercept stated had "little evidence beyond their respective genders". However, when Stevens publicly endorsed Mike Rogers in the general election in November 2026, she labeled the move as "pathetic".

==== Israel ====
According to The Intercept, Watts is known for targeting critics of Israel on social media. In 2023, Watts signed an open letter thanking then-President Biden for supporting Israel following the October 7 attacks and a statement condemning alleged sexual violence by Hamas during the attacks.

The Times of San Diego has described her as "oppos[ing] Democrats accepting AIPAC money" and condemning AIPAC as a "right wing, pro-Netanyahu organization".

== Writing ==
Watts is the author of the 2019 book Fight Like a Mother: How a Grassroots Movement Took on the Gun Lobby and Why Women Will Change the World. The book's foreword was written by actress Julianne Moore, who is also the founding chair of the Everytown Creative Council. Watts also blogs on Medium about her work and the victories achieved by Moms Demand Action volunteers. Watts is also active on Twitter, where she has more than 500,000 followers. She has also appeared as a commentator on MS NOW, CNN, CBS and NPR and written opinion pieces for Elle, Refinery29, Time, Newsweek and Marie Claire, among others.

== Personal life ==
Since starting Moms Demand Action, Watts has lived in Indiana, Colorado and California. She is the mother of five children. In her book, Watts wrote that she was enrolled in a yoga teacher training course when she founded Moms Demand Action. She is a Buddhist who practices yoga and meditates at least once a day.

== Awards and recognition ==
- 2008: PRWeek's 40 Under 40
- 2014: People Magazine's 15 Women Changing the World Right Now
- 2018: Bloomberg Philanthropies, award in recognition for work to reduce gun violence
- 2018: Instyle, Badass Woman
- 2018: People Magazine, 25 Women Changing the World
- 2018: YBCA 100 Honoree, Yerba Buena Center for the Arts, San Francisco
- 2019: University of Missouri Griffiths Leadership Society “Spirit of Martha” Award
- 2020: Peacemaker of the Year Award from the Houston Peace and Justice Center
- 2020: Teacher's College, Columbia University, Medal for Distinguished Service
- 2021: Washington University in St. Louis, Honorary Doctorate of Humanities
- 2022: Glamour Women of the Year
- 2022: TheWrap Power Women Summit Changemakers of the Year
- 2023: TIME 100 Most Influential People in the World
