= Center Forward (disambiguation) =

Center Forward is a centrist social and political advocacy nonprofit based in Washington, D.C.

Center Forward or Centre Forward may also refer to:

- Centre forward (or center forward), a position in association football
- Forward-center, a position in basketball
