= 2026 United States Senate election in Michigan =

- November 3, 2026
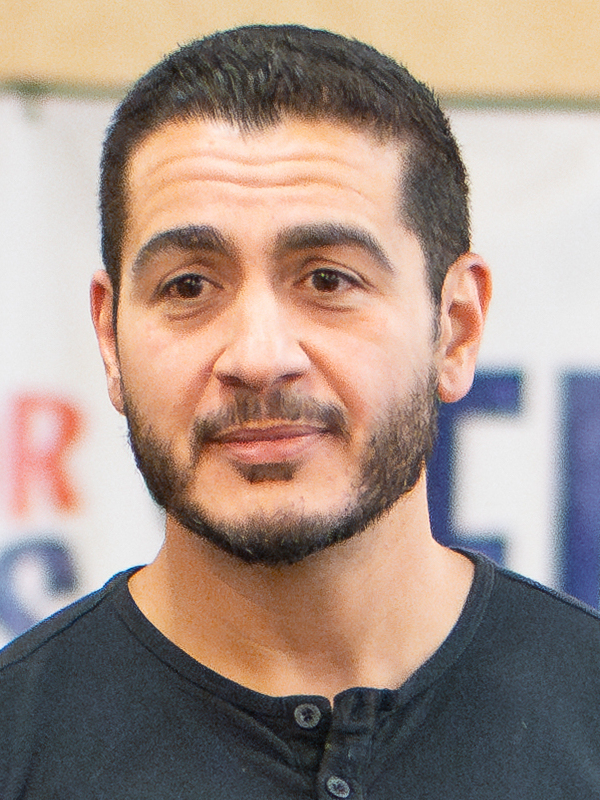

Nominee	Abdul El-Sayed	Mike Rogers
Party	Democratic	Republican
Popular vote	2,521,693	2,180,388
Percentage	52.56%	45.44%
- El-Sayed: 40–50% 50–60% 60–70% 70–80% Rogers: 40–50% 50–60% 60–70% 70–80%
U.S. senator before election
Gary Peters
Democratic
Elected U.S. senator
Abdul El-Sayed
Democratic

The 2026 United States Senate election in Michigan was held on November 3, 2026 to elect the Class 2 member of the United States Senate to represent the state of Michigan. Democratic former Wayne County health director Abdul El-Sayed defeated Republican former representative Mike Rogers. Democratic incumbent Gary Peters did not seek a third term.

For most of the primary, El-Sayed, Representative Haley Stevens, and state senator Mallory McMorrow sought the Democratic nomination. After McMorrow withdrew in July, El-Sayed and Stevens remained in a tight race, which El-Sayed won on August 4 with 48.5% of the vote. Rogers, the Republican nominee in 2024, was the only candidate to qualify for his party's primary ballot.

The election was the only open Democratic-held Senate seat up for election in a state won by Donald Trump in the 2024 presidential election. It was also the most expensive in Michigan history, with over $243 million in spending. El-Sayed's victory made him the first Muslim American elected to the United States Senate.

== Background ==
Michigan is regarded as a swing state. Most recently in the 2020 and 2024 presidential elections, it backed Joe Biden by 2.8% and Donald Trump by 1.4%, respectively. Gary Peters was first elected with 54.6% of the vote in 2014 and re-elected with 49.9% in 2020. He announced in January 2025 he was not seeking reelection for a third term.

Both parties have had electoral success in Michigan in recent years, though Democrats have performed better in non-presidential races. Democrats currently hold both U.S. Senate seats, all statewide executive offices, and the state senate. Republicans control the Michigan House of Representatives and hold a majority of the state's U.S. House seats. Republicans have not won a U.S. Senate race in Michigan since 1994, this Senate seat since 1972 or a non-presidential statewide election since 2014.

As one of two Democratic-held Senate seats in a state won by Donald Trump in 2024, Michigan was a key Senate battleground in 2026 and was viewed by some as one of the Republican Party's best opportunities to flip a Democratic-held seat.

== Democratic primary ==
=== Campaign ===
Mallory McMorrow, who was first elected to the Michigan Senate in 2018, announced her campaign for the U.S. Senate on April 2, 2025, becoming the first high-profile Democrat to enter the race to succeed Gary Peters. Her campaign launch featured footage from a 2022 speech defending her support for transgender individuals following criticism from Republican colleagues. Abdul El-Sayed, former director of Wayne County's Department of Health, Human and Veteran Services, entered the race on April 19, 2025. Haley Stevens, who has represented Michigan's 11th congressional district since 2019, announced her candidacy three days later. By March 2026, McMorrow had collected more than 30,000 volunteer-gathered signatures, qualifying for the ballot without paid petition circulators. In April 2026, Stevens and El-Sayed also qualified for the ballot after collecting the required signatures. That month, all three candidates spoke at the Michigan Democratic Party's Spring Endorsement Convention in Detroit.

Stevens, McMorrow, and El-Sayed each represented different ideological wings and campaign strategies within the Democratic Party. Stevens, who received private backing from Senate Democratic leadership, was viewed as the more moderate candidate, while El-Sayed was considered the most progressive. El-Sayed told Time that he is not a socialist and believes in capitalism. McMorrow centered her campaign on the need for new Democratic leadership and pledged not to support Chuck Schumer as Senate Democratic leader if elected. El-Sayed criticized that position, arguing it was shortsighted to oppose Schumer without identifying a successor. Stevens emphasized her role in helping rescue the Big Three automakers during the Obama administration, while McMorrow and El-Sayed promoted diversifying Michigan's economy through apprenticeships in industries such as beekeeping, winemaking, and leather-making.

McMorrow withdrew from the race in July 2026 after her polling declined. Following McMorrow's departure from the race, independent polls showed Stevens and El-Sayed statistically tied. In the days leading up to the election, polls had showed El-Sayed with a double digit lead. Stevens was later endorsed by Peters and several prominent Michigan Democrats, including former Senator Debbie Stabenow, former Governor Jennifer Granholm, and Governor Gretchen Whitmer.

Campaign finance emerged as a point of contrast during the primary. El-Sayed and McMorrow called for an end to corporate political spending and declined corporate donations during the election cycle, while Stevens expressed support for campaign finance reform and said she was "not taking any new pledges." Financial disclosure also became an issue after Stevens urged El-Sayed to release his financial disclosure report before the August 4 primary. El-Sayed had previously received an extension to file the report until August 13 but released his 2026 financial returns publicly in July. The New York Times reported in October 2026 that dozens of social media bot accounts had been paid by unknown sources to post content in support of Stevens.

Policy differences between the candidates centered on immigration, foreign policy, and healthcare. Israel emerged as a major issue in the race. El-Sayed, who is considered more pro-Palestinian and the most critical of Israel of all the candidates, called for ending all unconditional U.S. military aid to Israel. In contrast, Stevens has voted to provide additional military aid to Israel, has received significant support from the pro-Israel lobbying group AIPAC, and stated she does not believe there has been a genocide in Gaza. She supports a two-state solution and criticized Israeli Prime Minister Benjamin Netanyahu, accusing him of endangering Jewish people worldwide. On domestic policy, El-Sayed supports Medicare for All and the abolition of ICE, while Stevens has called for the expansion of Medicare access and reforming ICE. El-Sayed has faced criticism for claiming that he never supported the Defund the Police movement, despite previously promoting it on Detroit Public Radio and social media.

The Associated Press called the race for El-Sayed the morning after the election who had roughly a one percent lead over Stevens with 99% of the votes reporting. That same day, Stevens called El-Sayed to concede the race and pledged to support him in the general election against Mike Rogers. Following Stevens' defeat, an AIPAC spokesperson stated: "Our members remain determined to ensure that voters reject Dr. El-Sayed and his radical anti-Israel agenda in November." The New York Times also reported that AIPAC prepared to launch an advertising campaign in support of Mike Rogers, the Republican candidate for the Senate in Michigan. However, Rogers and some of his allies were hesitant about this support, worried that making the multimillion-dollar spending public would backfire politically. With $59 million in cash, the super PAC began planning to spend money in support of Rogers and against Dr. El-Sayed in the general election.

AIPAC and groups aligned with it put nearly $30 million behind Haley Stevens in her Democratic primary fight against Abdul El-Sayed, the Associated Press reported. Axios reported that the United Democracy Project (UDP), a super PAC tied to AIPAC, had booked around $19 million in TV ads for Stevens in the final five weeks before the primary. After El-Sayed won the nomination, UDP turned to sending out mailers against him in the general election at a cost of more than $280,000.

On October 30, 2026, Haley Stevens asked Abdul El-Sayed to condemn a controversial ad that linked Michigan's economic hardship to U.S. aid to Israel. Although the ad was produced by an independent PAC supporting El-Sayed's candidacy, his campaign had no role in creating it. El-Sayed said he disagreed with the ad's content, but he did not want to play into the "condemn game" over an ad run by an independent group.

=== Analysis ===
Stevens benefited from an outside spending advantage, with approximately $62 million spent on her behalf, amounting to a 9–1 advantage to El-Sayed. AIPAC and affiliated pro-Israel political groups spent nearly $30 million supporting Stevens, surpassing all of their prior investments made for a candidate in a particular race. Their primary political action committee, the United Democracy Project (UDP), released a Michigan advertisement featuring a 2018 clip of Barack Obama praising Stevens for her work as chief of staff to a federal task force created to assist the automobile industry in 2009.

El-Sayed harnessed Democratic frustration with the party establishment to narrowly defeat Stevens in the primary. The Washington Post said that several factors helped with El-Sayed's success, including anti-establishment sentiment in the Democratic base, his campaign against large political donations, and opposition to AIPAC and Israel's actions in Gaza. El-Sayed performed well in liberal strongholds and college towns in his win over Stevens.

Vermont senator Bernie Sanders also said in a tweet that AIPAC planned to spend $233 million to defeat candidates who oppose Benjamin Netanyahu's government. He also said: "They spent $33 million to defeat Abdul El-Sayed in the Michigan primary, but they lost."

=== Candidates ===
==== Nominee ====
- Abdul El-Sayed, former Wayne County health director (2023–2025) and candidate for governor in 2018

==== Eliminated in primary ====
- Haley Stevens, U.S. representative from Michigan's 11th congressional district (2019–present)

==== Not on ballot ====
- Rachel Howard, research health specialist

==== Withdrawn ====
- Mallory McMorrow, state senator from the 8th district (2019–present) (remained on ballot)
- Joe Tate, former speaker of the Michigan House of Representatives (2023–2025) from the 9th district (2019–present) (endorsed Stevens)

==== Declined ====
- Pete Buttigieg, former U.S. secretary of transportation (2021–2025)
- Debbie Dingell, U.S. representative from Michigan's 6th congressional district (2015–present) (ran for re-election)
- Garlin Gilchrist, lieutenant governor of Michigan (2019–present) (ran for secretary of state)
- Gary Peters, incumbent U.S. senator (2015–present) (endorsed Stevens)
- Kristen McDonald Rivet, U.S. representative from Michigan's 8th congressional district (2025–present) (ran for re-election)
- Hillary Scholten, U.S. representative from Michigan's 3rd congressional district (2023–present) (ran for re-election; endorsed Stevens)
- Shri Thanedar, U.S. representative from Michigan's 13th congressional district (2023–present) (ran for re-election; endorsed Stevens)
- Gretchen Whitmer, governor of Michigan (2019–present) (endorsed Stevens)

=== Endorsements ===
Abdul El-Sayed

U.S. senators

- Ed Markey, Massachusetts (2013–present)
- Bernie Sanders, Vermont (2007–present) (Independent)
- Tina Smith, Minnesota (2018–present)
- Chris Van Hollen, Maryland (2017–present)
- Elizabeth Warren, Massachusetts (2013–present) (previously endorsed McMorrow)

U.S. representatives

- David Bonior, former House whip (Note: Bonior was the majority whip from 1991 to 1995 and minority whip from 1995 to 2002) (1991–2002) from MI-10 (1977–2003)
- Jamaal Bowman, former NY-16 (2021–2025)
- Greg Casar, TX-35 (2023–present)
- Maxwell Frost, FL-10 (2023–present)
- Adelita Grijalva, AZ-7 (2025–present)
- Pramila Jayapal, WA-7 (2017–present)
- Ro Khanna, CA-17 (2017–present)
- Summer Lee, PA-12 (2023–present)
- Andy Levin, former MI-09 (2019–2023)
- Analilia Mejia, NJ-11 (2026–present)
- Alexandria Ocasio-Cortez, NY-14 (2019–present)
- Ilhan Omar, MN-05 (2019–present)
- Ayanna Pressley, MA-7 (2019–present)
- Delia Ramirez, IL-3 (2023–present)
- Lateefah Simon, CA-12 (2025–present)
- Rashida Tlaib, MI-12 (2019–present)
- Bonnie Watson Coleman, NJ-12 (2015–present)

Statewide officials

- Keith Ellison, attorney general of Minnesota (2019–present)
- Peggy Flanagan, lieutenant governor of Minnesota (2019–present)
- Fadwa Hammoud, former solicitor general of Michigan (2019–2023)

State legislators

- Darrin Camilleri, SD-4 (2019–present)
- Mary Cavanagh, SD-6 (2023–present) (previously endorsed McMorrow)
- Stephanie Chang, SD-3 (2019–present)
- Jeff Irwin, SD-15 (2019–present) (previously endorsed McMorrow)
- 16 state representatives (Note: Emily Dievendorf, HD-77 (2023–present); Jim Ellison, former HD-26 (2017–2022) (previously endorsed McMorrow); Alabas Farhat, HD-3 (2023–present); Rachel Hood, former HD-81 (2019–2024); Kara Hope, HD-74 (2019–present); Donavan McKinney, HD-11 (2023–present) and Democratic nominee for Michigan's 13th Congressional District 2026; Reggie Miller, HD-31 (2023–present); Tonya Myers Phillips, HD-7 (2025–present); Cynthia Neeley, HD-70 (2020–present); Laurie Pohutsky, HD-17 (2019–present); Chris Rabb, Pennsylvania's HD-200 (2017–present); Yousef Rabhi, former HD-53 (2017–2023); Carrie Rheingans, HD-47 (2023–present); Ruwa Romman, Georgia's HD-97 (2023–present); Dylan Wegela, HD-26 (2023–present); Jimmie Wilson Jr., HD-32 (2023–present))

Local officials

- Warren Evans, Wayne County executive (2015–present)
- Alex Garza, Wayne County commissioner from the 14th district (2024–present)
- Abdullah Hammoud, mayor of Dearborn (2022–present)
- George Heartwell, former mayor of Grand Rapids (2004–2016)
- Brad Lander, former New York City comptroller (2022–2025)
- Sheldon Neeley, mayor of Flint (2019–present)
- Martha Scott, Wayne County commissioner from the 3rd district (2011–present)

Individuals

- Basim Elkarra, executive director of the Council on American-Islamic Relations
- Jon Favreau, co-founder of Crooked Media and former White House director of speechwriting (2009–2013)
- Adam Hamawy, surgeon
- Hill Harper, actor
- William Lawrence, co-founder of Sunrise Movement and Democratic nominee for Michigan's 7th Congressional District 2026
- Jon Lovett, co-founder of Crooked Media
- Walter Masterson, comedian and political satirist
- Michael Moore, filmmaker and author
- Hasan Piker, political commentator
- Ms. Rachel, YouTuber and children's educator
- Ben Rhodes, political commentator and former deputy national security advisor for strategic communications (2009–2017)
- Horace Sheffield III, pastor and talk show host

Labor unions

- American Association of University Professors
- American Federation of Government Employees Locals 704 and 2092
- American Federation of Teachers Michigan
- Association of Flight Attendants
- International Alliance of Theatrical Stage Employees Local 26
- National Nurses United
- United Auto Workers
- United Food and Commercial Workers Local 951

Organizations

- 314 Action
- American Priorities
- Clean Water Action
- CAIR Action
- End Citizens United
- Gen-Z for Change
- Hindus for Human Rights
- High School Democrats of America
- Indivisible
- Jewish Voice for Peace Action
- Michigan Democratic Party Grassroots Caucus
- Michigan Democratic Party LGBT&A Caucus
- Michigan Democratic Party Progressive Caucus
- Michigan Democratic Party Veterans Caucus
- MoveOn
- New American Leaders Action Fund
- A New Policy PAC
- Our Revolution
- PAL PAC
- Patriotic Millionaires (co-endorsement with McMorrow)
- Peace Action
- Progressive Change Campaign Committee
- Progressive Victory
- Track AIPAC
- US Campaign for Palestinian Rights Action
- Young Democrats of Michigan

Political parties

- Working Families Party

Newspapers

- The Michigan Daily
- Detroit Metro Times
Haley Stevens

Executive branch officials

- Jennifer Granholm, former secretary of energy (2021–2025) and former governor of Michigan (2003–2011)

U.S. senators

- Chris Coons, Delaware (2010–present)
- Catherine Cortez Masto, Nevada (2017–present)
- Ruben Gallego, Arizona (2025–present)
- Gary Peters, Michigan (2015–present) (previously declined to endorse)
- Chuck Schumer, Senate minority leader (2017–2021, 2025–present) from New York (1999–present)
- Jeanne Shaheen, New Hampshire (2009–present)
- Debbie Stabenow, former Michigan (2001–2025) (previously declined to endorse)

U.S. representatives

- Jim Clyburn, SC-6 (1993–present)
- Brenda Jones, former MI-13 (2018–2019)
- Brenda Lawrence, former MI-14 (2015–2023)
- Nancy Pelosi, former speaker of the House (2007–2011, 2019–2023) from CA-11 (1987–present)
- Mark Schauer, former MI-07 (2009–2011)
- Hillary Scholten, MI-03 (2023–present)
- Shri Thanedar, MI-13 (2023–present)
- 15 other U.S. representatives (Note: Gabe Amo, RI-01 (2023–present); Shontel Brown, OH-11 (2021–present); Janelle Bynum, OR-05 (2025–present); Troy Carter, LA-02 (2021–present); Don Davis, NC-01 (2023–present); Lois Frankel, FL-22 (2013–present); Steven Horsford, NV-04 (2013–2015, 2019–present); Lucy McBath, GA-06 (2019–present); Jennifer McClellan, VA-04 (2023–present); Gregory Meeks, NY-05 (1998–present); Terri Sewell, AL-07 (2011–present); Marilyn Strickland, WA-10 (2021–present); Emilia Sykes, OH-13 (2023–present); Lauren Underwood, IL-14 (2019–present); Marc Veasey, TX-33 (2013–present))

Statewide officials

- James Blanchard, former governor of Michigan (1983–1991)
- Ellen Lipton, member of the Michigan State Board of Education (2021–present)
- Dana Nessel, attorney general of Michigan (2019–present)
- Martin O'Malley, former governor of Maryland (2007–2015)
- Gretchen Whitmer, governor of Michigan (2019–present) (previously declined to endorse)

State legislators

- Dayna Polehanki, SD-5 (2019–present)
- Joe Tate, former speaker of the Michigan House of Representatives (2023–2025) from HD-09 (2019–present)
- Paul Wojno, SD-10 (2019–present) (previously endorsed McMorrow)
- 6 other state representatives (Note: Brenda Carter, HD-53 (2019–present); Tyrone Carter, HD-01 (2019–present); Jennifer Conlin, HD-48 (2023–present) (previously endorsed McMorrow); Amos O'Neal, HD-94 (2021–present); Helena Scott, HD-08 (2021–present); Samantha Steckloff, HD-19 (2021–present))

Local officials

- Dave Bing, former mayor of Detroit (2009–2014)
- David LaGrand, mayor of Grand Rapids (2025–present) and former state representative from HD-75 (2016–2023)
- Colleen Ochoa, member of the Oakland University Board of Trustees (2022–present) and wife of Gary Peters
- Andy Schor, mayor of Lansing (2018–present) and former state representative from HD-68 (2013–2018)

Individuals

- Shannon Watts, founder of Moms Demand Action

Party officials

- Lavora Barnes, former chair of the Michigan Democratic Party (2019–2025)
- Lon Johnson, former chair of the Michigan Democratic Party (2013–2015)
- Keith Williams, chair of the Michigan Democratic Party Black Caucus (2018–present) and former Wayne County commissioner from the 6th district (2003–2010)

Party chapters

- 13th Congressional District Democratic Party

Labor unions

- Bricklayers and Allied Craftworkers Local 2
- International Brotherhood of Boilermakers Local 169
- International Union of Painters and Allied Trades
- Iron Workers Local 25
- LiUNA Michigan
- Michigan Machinists Council
- Michigan Professional Fire Fighters Union
- Northern Midwest Regional Council of Carpenters
- Sheet Metal Workers' Local 80
- SMART Local 292
- Teamsters Locals 243, 299, and Joint Council 43
- UNITE HERE Local 24
- United Association Locals 98, 333, and 636
- United Food and Commercial Workers Local 876
- United Steelworkers

Organizations

- AIPAC
- Congressional Black Caucus PAC
- Democratic Majority for Israel
- Elect Democratic Women
- EMILYs List
- Jewish Democratic Council of America (co-endorsement with McMorrow)
- Joint Action Committee for Political Affairs
- Michigan Democratic Party Black Caucus

Newspapers

- The Detroit News
- Michigan Chronicle
Mallory McMorrow (withdrawn, remained on ballot)

U.S. senators

- Martin Heinrich, New Mexico (2013–present)
- Chris Murphy, Connecticut (2013–present)
- ~~Elizabeth Warren, Massachusetts (2013–present)~~ (endorsed El-Sayed after withdrawal)
- Peter Welch, Vermont (2023–present)

Statewide officials

- John D. Cherry Jr., former lieutenant governor of Michigan (2003–2011)

State legislators

- Winnie Brinks, Senate majority leader (2023–present) from SD-29 (2019–present)
- 10 other state senators (Note: ~~Mary Cavanagh, SD-6 (2023–present)~~ (endorsed El-Sayed after withdrawal); John Daniel Cherry, SD-27 (2023–present); Vin Gopal, New Jersey's LD-11 (2018–present); Adam Hollier, former SD-2 (2018–2023); Jeff Irwin, SD-15 (2019–present); Veronica Klinefelt, SD-11 (2023–present); Sue Shink, SD-14 (2023–present); Sam Singh, SD-28 (2023–present); Zach Wahls, Iowa's SD-43 (2019–present); ~~Paul Wojno, SD-10 (2019–present)~~ (endorsed Stevens after withdrawal))
- 8 state representatives (Note: Joey Andrews, HD-38 (2023–present); ~~Jennifer Conlin, HD-48 (2023–present)~~ (endorsed Stevens after withdrawal); Margie Donlon, New Jersey's LD-11 (2024–present); Carol Glanville, HD-84 (2023–present); Sharon MacDonell, HD-56 (2023–present); Mari Manoogian, former HD-40 (2019–2022); Luanne Peterpaul, New Jersey's LD-11 (2024–present); Will Snyder, HD-87 (2023–present))

Local officials

- Karen Weaver, former mayor of Flint (2015–2019)

Party chapters

- 12th Congressional District Democratic Party

Labor unions

- Brotherhood of Locomotive Engineers and Trainmen Michigan State Legislative Board
- International Brotherhood of Electrical Workers Local 17
- SMART transportation division
- United Association Locals 357 and 370
- Utility Workers Union of America

Organizations

- J Street PAC
- Jewish Democratic Council of America (co-endorsement with Stevens)
- Majority Democrats
- The NewDEAL
- Patriotic Millionaires (co-endorsement with El-Sayed)
- Vote Mama

Newspapers

- Detroit Free Press
Declined to endorse

Executive branch officials

- Kamala Harris, former vice president of the United States (2021–2025)
- Barack Obama, former president of the United States (2009–2017)

U.S. senators

- ~~Gary Peters, Michigan (2015–present)~~ (endorsed Stevens)
- Elissa Slotkin, Michigan (2025–present)
- ~~Debbie Stabenow, former Michigan (2001–2025)~~ (endorsed Stevens)

U.S. representatives

- Debbie Dingell, MI-06 (2015–present)

Statewide officials

- ~~Gretchen Whitmer, governor of Michigan (2019–present)~~ (endorsed Stevens)

State legislators

- Mallory McMorrow, state senator from the 8th district (2019–present) and former candidate for this election

=== Debates and forum ===
2026 Michigan Democratic Senate primary debates and forum
No.	Date	Host	Moderator	Link	Democratic	Democratic	Democratic
Key: P Participant W Withdrawn							
Key: P Participant W Withdrawn					El-Sayed	McMorrow	Stevens
1	February 11, 2026	United Auto Workers	Mark DePaoli; Brandon Mancilla; LaShawn English	YouTube	P	P	P
2	April 24, 2026	Council of Baptist Pastors of Detroit and Vicinity	Jackie Nelson; James Williams	YouTube	P	P	P
3	May 28, 2026	Mackinac Policy Conference	Nolan Finley; Stephen Henderson	YouTube	P	P	P
4	July 7, 2026	WOOD-TV	Rick Albin	YouTube	P	W	P
5	July 27, 2026	Fox 2 Detroit	Roop Raj	YouTube	P	W	P

=== Fundraising ===
Italics indicate a withdrawn candidate.

Campaign finance reports as of July 15, 2026
Candidate	Raised	Spent	Cash on hand
Abdul El-Sayed (D)	$14,514,335	$11,961,573	$2,552,762
Rachel Howard (D)	$10,937 (Note: $3,287 of this total has been self-funded by Howard)	$6,170	$4,766
Mallory McMorrow (D)	$11,386,720	$9,519,089	$1,867,631
Haley Stevens (D)	$11,884,632 (Note: $1.5 million of this total was transferred from Stevens' House campaign accounts)	$9,091,338	$2,793,294
Joe Tate (D)	$243,635	$243,635	$0
Source: Federal Election Commission

=== Polling ===
Aggregate polls

Source of poll aggregation	Dates administered	Dates updated	Abdul El-Sayed	Mallory McMorrow	Haley Stevens	Undecided (Note: Calculated by taking the difference of 100% and all other candidates combined.)	Margin
270toWin	June 29 – July 29, 2026	July 31, 2026	46.8%	4.5%	39.4%	9.3%	El-Sayed +7.4%
Decision Desk HQ	through July 30, 2026	August 3, 2026	53.0%	—	39.6%	7.4%	El-Sayed +13.4%
RealClearPolitics	July 8–29, 2026	July 30, 2026	50.5%	—	40.3%	9.2%	El-Sayed +10.2%
FiftyPlusOne	through July 30, 2026	August 1, 2026	51.8%	3.8%	38.9%	5.5%	El-Sayed +12.9%
Average			50.5%	4.2%	39.6%	5.7%	El-Sayed +10.9%

Poll source	Date(s) administered	Sample size (Note: Key: A – all adults RV – registered voters LV – likely voters V – unclear)	Margin of error	Abdul El-Sayed	Mallory McMorrow	Haley Stevens	Other	Undecided
SoCal Strategies (R) (Note: Poll sponsored by Red Eagle Politics)	July 28–30, 2026	437 (LV)	± 4.7%	56%	—	39%	—	5%
Zenith Research (D) (Note: Poll commissioned by Fighting for Michigan, a pro-El-Sayed super PAC)	July 26–30, 2026	536 (LV)	± 4.2%	59% (Note: With voters who lean towards a given candidate)	—	41%	—	—
Zenith Research (D)	July 26–30, 2026	536 (LV)	± 4.2%	53%	2%	34%	—	11%
Mitchell Research & Communications	July 28–29, 2026	406 (LV)	± 4.9%	52%	4%	38%	—	7%
The Public Sentiment Institute	July 25–29, 2026	762 (RV)	± 4.0%	50%	—	36%	—	14%
The Public Sentiment Institute	July 25–29, 2026	762 (LV)	± 4.0%	48%	—	40%	—	13%
Emerson College (Note: Poll sponsored by WLNS 6 News and WOOD-TV)	July 26–27, 2026	700 (LV)	± 3.7%	57%	2%	41%	—	—
Emerson College	July 26–27, 2026	700 (LV)	± 3.7%	54%	2%	39%	—	6%
Tavern Research (D)	July 26–27, 2026	914 (LV)	± 4.1%	46%	4%	36%	—	14%
Tavern Research (D)	July 26–27, 2026	914 (LV)	± 4.1%	48%	—	37%	—	15%
Tulchin Research (D)	July 13–15, 2026	500 (LV)	—	56%	—	40%	—	4%
Data for Progress (D) (Note: Poll sponsored by American Priorities, which supports El-Sayed)	July 10–14, 2026	614 (LV)	± 4.0%	54%	—	41%	—	5%
Glengariff Group (Note: Poll conducted for The Detroit News, which supports Stevens, and WDIV-TV)	July 8–11, 2026	500 (LV)	± 4.4%	41%	—	48%	—	11%
Tavern Research (D)	July 6–8, 2026	2,211 (LV)	± 2.5%	41%	5%	38%	—	16%
Tavern Research (D)	July 6–8, 2026	2,211 (LV)	± 2.5%	41%	—	42%	—	18%
	July 5, 2026	McMorrow suspends her campaign						
Quantus Insights (R)	June 29–30, 2026	947 (LV)	± 3.3%	41%	8%	36%	—	16%
Tulchin Research (D)	June 24–28, 2026	500 (LV)	± 4.4%	46%	17%	27%	—	9%
Peak Insights (R)	June 20–24, 2026	400 (LV)	± 6.0%	39%	18%	28%	—	15%
Susquehanna Polling & Research	June 9–14, 2026	205 (LV)	± 6.9%	22%	9%	20%	—	49%
Mitchell Research & Communications (Note: Poll conducted for MIRS News)	June 11–13, 2026	409 (LV)	± 4.9%	42%	6%	33%	—	19%
Lake Research Partners (D) (Note: Poll sponsored by El-Sayed's campaign)	May 26–28, 2026	600 (LV)	± 4.0%	34%	19%	31%	—	15%
Tulchin Research (D)	May 19–25, 2026	500 (LV)	—	41%	18%	23%	—	18%
TIPP Insights (R) (Note: Poll sponsored by the League of American Workers, a conservative advocacy group founded by Steve Cortes, former senior advisor to President Donald Trump.)	May 20–23, 2026	619 (LV)	—	31%	13%	35%	1% (Note: Rachel Howard with 1%; Travis Zollner with 0%)	19%
Mitchell Research	May 1–7, 2026	405 (LV)	± 4.9%	27%	17%	18%	—	38%
Glengariff Group (Note: Poll sponsored by The Detroit Regional Chamber)	April 17–19, 2026	500 (LV)	± 4.4%	23%	16%	25%	0%	36%
Glengariff Group	April 17–19, 2026	500 (LV)	± 4.4%	23% (Note: Among "definite voters")	18%	25%	—	34%
Emerson College	April 11–13, 2026	519 (LV)	± 4.3%	24%	24%	13%	3% (Note: Travis Zollner with 3%; Rachel Howard with 0%)	36%
Data for Progress (D) (Note: Poll sponsored by Zeteo and Drop Site News)	April 2–8, 2026	515 (LV)	± 4.0%	22%	22%	23%	—	33%
Global Strategy Group (D) (Note: Poll sponsored by McMorrow's campaign)	March 19−22, 2026	800 (LV)	± 3.5%	25%	30%	23%	—	21%
Upswing Research (D) (Note: Poll commissioned by Public First Action)	February 26 – March 2, 2026	600 (LV)	± 4.0%	23%	25%	27%	—	25%
Impact Research (D) (Note: Poll sponsored by Stevens's campaign)	February 10–16, 2026	800 (LV)	± 3.5%	26%	25%	28%	—	21%
Emerson College	January 24–25, 2026	491 (LV)	± 4.4%	16%	22%	16%	7% (Note: "Someone else" with 5%; Rachel Howard with 2%; Travis Zollner with 0%)	38%
Mitchell Research & Communications	November 18–21, 2025	261 (LV)	± 6.1%	16%	24%	27%	—	33%
Rosetta Stone Communications (R)	October 23–25, 2025	287 (LV)	± 5.8%	20%	25%	26%	—	29%
NRSC (R)	July 4–7, 2025	582 (LV)	± 3.0%	22%	11%	24%	1% (Note: Joe Tate with 1%)	42%
Global Strategy Group (D)	May 28 − June 2, 2025	800 (LV)	± 3.5%	15%	20%	24%	4% (Note: Joe Tate with 4%)	37%
Glengariff Group	May 5–8, 2025	600 (RV)	± 4.0%	22%	14%	34%	—	30%
Glengariff Group	May 5–8, 2025	600 (RV)	± 4.0%	24%	12%	34%	—	30%

Hypothetical polling

Poll source	Date(s) administered	Sample size	Margin of error	Pete Buttigieg	Haley Stevens	Gretchen Whitmer	Other	Undecided
Mitchell Research	March 13, 2025	303 (LV)	± 5.6%	—	2%	59%	22% (Note: Dana Nessel with 13%; Mallory McMorrow with 6%; Hillary Scholten with 3%)	17%
Target Insyght	February 3–8, 2025	344 (V)	± 5.7%	27%	4%	43%	—	26%

=== Results ===
County results El-Sayed: 40–50%; 50–60%; 60–70%; Stevens: 40–50%; 50–60%; 60–70%

Congressional district results El-Sayed: 50–60%; Stevens: 40–50%; 50–60%

Precinct results (Note: Lapeer County's precinct-level results are unavailable as of October 29, 2026. The county's precincts are colored its countywide results percentage color.) El-Sayed: 40–50%; 50–60%; 60–70%; 70–80%; 80–90%; 90–100%; Stevens: 40–50%; 50–60%; 60–70%; 70–80%; 80–90%; 90–100%; Tie: 40–50%; 50%

In the primary election, El-Sayed won the election by carrying 30 of the state's 83 counties, including nine in the Upper Peninsula and an additional nine north of Grand Rapids. Stevens performed well in Metro Detroit, The Thumb, and much of Northern Michigan. She carried the majority of the vote in Michigan's suburban areas by five percentage points, whereas El-Sayed had his strongest showing with voters aged 18–34 and those living in cities outside of Detroit.

Democratic primary results
Party	Candidate	Votes	%
Democratic	Abdul El-Sayed	744,952	48.45
Democratic	Haley Stevens	731,160	47.55
Democratic	Mallory McMorrow (withdrawn)	61,516	4.00
Total votes		1,537,628	100.0

== Republican primary ==
=== Campaign ===
Michigan was considered one of the top Republican senate pickup opportunities for the 2026 cycle, and national Republicans quickly coalesced around their 2024 Senate nominee, former congressman Mike Rogers, as their preferred candidate. Rogers' only significant opposition was from former co-chair of the Michigan Republican Party Bernadette Smith, who had vacated this position one week prior to the launch of her candidacy. Fox News labeled her campaign as a "longshot" due to Donald Trump having already endorsed Rogers prior to Smith's entrance into the race, and because of her criminal record, which included a no-contest plea of felony welfare fraud and a guilty conviction for seriously injuring a ten-year-old boy in an automobile accident. Smith did not make the primary ballot after being disqualified by the Board of State Canvassers for not submitting the required number of signatures, thus allowing Rogers to win the nomination uncontested.

=== Candidates ===
==== Nominee ====
- Mike Rogers, former U.S. representative from Michigan's 8th congressional district (2001–2015) and nominee for U.S. Senate in 2024

==== Disqualified ====
- Bernadette Smith, former co-chair of the Michigan Republican Party (2025)

==== Not on ballot ====
- Kent Benham, dentist
- Genevieve Peters Scott, educator

==== Withdrawn ====
- Fred Heurtebise, engineer and welder

==== Declined ====
- Mike Cox, former Michigan attorney general (2003–2011) (ran for governor)
- Tudor Dixon, conservative media personality and nominee for governor in 2022
- Tony Dungy, former head coach of the Tampa Bay Buccaneers and the Indianapolis Colts
- Bill Huizenga, U.S. representative from Michigan's 4th congressional district (2011–present) (ran for re-election)
- Perry Johnson, businessman, disqualified candidate for governor in 2022, and candidate for president in 2024 (ran for governor)
- Lisa McClain, U.S. representative from Michigan's 9th congressional district (2021–present) (ran for re-election)
- Kevin Rinke, former car dealer and candidate for governor in 2022

=== Endorsements ===
Mike Rogers

Executive branch officials

- Donald Trump, president of the United States (2017–2021, 2025–present)

U.S. senators

- John Barrasso, Senate majority whip (2025–present) from Wyoming (2007–present)
- Tim Scott, South Carolina (2013–present)
- John Thune, Senate majority leader (2025–present) from South Dakota (2005–present)

U.S. representatives

- Jack Bergman, MI-01 (2017–present)
- Newt Gingrich, former speaker of the House (1995–1999) from GA-06 (1979–1999)
- Tim Walberg, MI-05 (2011–present)

State legislators

- Greg Alexander, HD-98 (2023–present)
- Joseph Aragona, HD-60 (2023–present)
- Joe Bellino, SD-16 (2023–present)
- William Bruck, HD-30 (2023–present)
- Jaime Greene, HD-65 (2023–present)
- Thomas Kuhn, HD-57 (2023–present)
- Matt Maddock, HD-51 (2019–present)
- David Martin, HD-68 (2021–present)
- Alicia St. Germaine, HD-62 (2023–present)
- Jamie Thompson, HD-28 (2023–present)

Organizations

- Americans for Prosperity
- Associated Builders and Contractors (Note: Both the national and state chapters endorsed Rogers)
- Log Cabin Republicans
- Michigan Farm Bureau
- Southeast Michigan Chamber of Commerce

=== Fundraising ===
Italics indicate a withdrawn or disqualified candidate.

Campaign finance reports as of July 15, 2026
Candidate	Raised	Spent	Cash on hand
Fred Heurtebise (R)	$10,058	$10,058	$0
Mike Rogers (R)	$10,898,177	$6,680,643	$4,473,237
Genevieve Scott (R)	$83,079 (Note: $48,669 of this total has been self-funded by Scott)	$80,540	$2,538
Bernadette Smith (R)	$77,239	$73,172	$4,067
Source: Federal Election Commission

=== Polling ===
Poll source	Date(s) administered	Sample size	Margin of error	Mike Rogers	Bernadette Smith	Other	Undecided
Emerson College	April 11–13, 2026	452 (LV)	± 4.6%	55%	1%	6% (Note: Kent Benham and Andrew Kamal with 2%; Frederick Heurtebise and Genevieve Peters Scott with 1%)	38%

Hypothetical polling

Poll source	Date(s) administered	Sample size	Margin of error	Tudor Dixon	Bill Huizenga	Mike Rogers	Other	Undecided
Fabrizio, Lee & Associates (R) (Note: Poll commissioned by First Principles Digital PAC, which supports Rogers)	June 17–19, 2025	600 (LV)	± 4.0%	–	20%	48%	–	32%
Glengariff Group	May 5–8, 2025	600 (RV)	± 4.0%	–	17%	61%	–	22%
Mitchell Research	March 13, 2025	281 (LV)	± 5.8%	28%	9%	25%	14% (Note: Peter Meijer with 8%; Kevin Rinke with 4%; Bryan Posthumus with 2%; Jonathon Lindsey with 0%)	24%
Fabrizio, Lee & Associates (R)	February 17–19, 2025	600 (LV)	± 4.0%	40%	–	36%	–	24%

=== Results ===
Republican primary results
Party	Candidate	Votes	%
Republican	Mike Rogers	883,328	100.0
Total votes		883,328	100.0

== Third-parties and independents ==
=== Independents ===
==== Not on ballot ====
- TJ Stephens, business executive

==== Fundraising ====
Campaign finance reports as of July 15, 2026
Candidate	Raised	Spent	Cash on hand
TJ Stephens (I)	$1,000 (Note: $500 of this total has been self-funded by Stephens)	$220	$779
Source: Federal Election Commission

=== Libertarian Party ===
==== Nominee ====
- Lydia Christensen, CEO

=== Green Party ===
==== Nominee ====
- Douglas P. Marsh, journalist and Green nominee for U.S. Senate in 2024

=== U.S. Taxpayers Party ===
==== Nominee ====
- Tim Long

=== Natural Law Party ===
==== Nominee ====
- Walter P. Kristy

== General election ==
=== Predictions ===
Source	Ranking	As of
ABC News	Lean D	November 3, 2026
CBS News	Tossup	October 30, 2026
The Cook Political Report	Lean D	November 2, 2026
Decision Desk HQ	Likely D	November 3, 2026
The Economist (Note: The Economist's prediction model uses unconventional terminology. For the purpose of equivalency, their "Very Likely" ratings are formatted as a "Likely" rating while "Likely" ratings are formatted as a "Lean" rating.)	Lean D	November 3, 2026
FiftyPlusOne	Likely D	November 3, 2026
Fox News	Tossup	November 1, 2026
Inside Elections	Tilt D	October 29, 2026
MS NOW	Tossup	October 29, 2026
NBC News	Lean D	November 3, 2026
RealClearPolitics	Tossup	November 2, 2026
Sabato's Crystal Ball	Lean D	November 2, 2026
Silver Bulletin	Likely D	November 3, 2026
Split Ticket	Likely D	November 2, 2026

=== Post-primary endorsements ===
On November 1, 2026, two days before the general election, Haley Stevens—who lost the Democratic primary—endorsed Republican Mike Rogers despite her earlier promise to support El-Sayed as well as her previous criticism of Rogers. That same day, she was uninvited to a joint event with El-Sayed. The move was widely attributed to disagreements between Stevens and El-Sayed on Israel, with Stevens being a strong supporter of Israel, having received tens of millions of dollars from AIPAC, while El-Sayed is a strong critic, having called Israel's military conduct in Gaza a genocide. Her endorsement followed a conflict in the preceding week in which an independent group backing El-Sayed released an ad connecting US military aid to Israel to the cost of living crisis. El-Sayed said he was unaffiliated with the ad while Stevens called it antisemitic and demanded a condemnation. Stevens was expelled from the Michigan Democratic Party and her actions were met with swift condemnation from most Democrats, with Senate Democratic Leader Chuck Schumer—who had endorsed Stevens in the primaries—calling her endorsement a "despicable betrayal." Much of Stevens's own team members resigned in protest. Senior Republican figures including Donald Trump and Mike Johnson praised the move. El-Sayed, in response, stated: "I actually don't think about Haley Stevens."

Abdul El-Sayed (D)

Executive branch officials

- Pete Buttigieg, former secretary of transportation (2021–2025)
- Kamala Harris, former vice president of the United States (2021–2025) and Democratic nominee for president in 2024
- Samuel Heins, former ambassador to Norway (2016–2017)
- Samuel Kaplan, former ambassador to Morocco (2009–2013)
- Barack Obama, former president of the United States (2009–2017)

U.S. senators

- Angela Alsobrooks, Maryland (2025–present)
- Al Franken, former Minnesota (2009–2018)
- Kirsten Gillibrand, New York (2009–present)
- Mark Kelly, Arizona (2020–present)
- Chris Murphy, Connecticut (2013–present)
- Gary Peters, Michigan (2015–present)
- Chuck Schumer, Senate minority leader (2017–2021, 2025–present) from New York (1999–present)
- Elissa Slotkin, Michigan (2025–present)

U.S. representatives

- Jim Clyburn, SC-06 (1993–present)
- Debbie Dingell, MI-06 (2015–present)
- Sander Levin, MI-09 (1983–2019)
- Nancy Pelosi, former speaker of the House (2007–2011, 2019–2023) from CA-11 (1987–present)
- ~~Haley Stevens, MI-11 (2019–present) and primary candidate for this seat~~ (switched endorsement to Rogers)

Statewide officials

- Dana Nessel, attorney general of Michigan (2019–present)
- Gavin Newsom, governor of California (2019–present)
- Gretchen Whitmer, governor of Michigan (2019–present)

State legislators

- Mallory McMorrow, SD-08 (2019–present) and former primary candidate for this seat

Local officials

- David LaGrand, mayor of Grand Rapids (2025–present) and former state representative from HD-75 (2016–2023)
- Eli Savit, Washtenaw County prosecuting attorney (2021–present) and Democratic nominee for Michigan Attorney General in 2026
- Mary Sheffield, mayor of Detroit (2026–present)
- James Tate, president of the Detroit City Council (2026–present) from the 1st district (2010–present)

Individuals

- Adam Brody, actor
- James Carville, political consultant
- Danny Fenster, journalist
- Taylor Hale, television personality
- Tim Miller, political consultant and writer (Independent)
- Mark Ruffalo, actor
- Bruce Springsteen, singer
- Kerry Washington, actress

Labor unions

- American Federation of Government Employees
- American Federation of State, County and Municipal Employees
- LiUNA Michigan
- Michigan AFL-CIO
- Michigan Education Association
- Michigan Farmers Union
- Michigan Machinists Council
- National Education Association

Organizations

- Bend the Arc: Jewish Action
- Congressional Black Caucus PAC
- Human Rights Campaign
- Leaders We Deserve
- League of Conservation Voters Action Fund
- Michigan Democratic Party Black Caucus
- Planned Parenthood Action Fund
- Reproductive Freedom for All
- Sierra Club Michigan
- Third Way

Newspapers

- Detroit Free Press
Mike Rogers (R)

Executive branch officials

- Sandy Baruah, acting administrator of the Small Business Administration (2008–2009)
- George W. Bush, former president of the United States (2001–2009)
- Sean Duffy, secretary of transportation (2025–present)
- Michael LaRosa, former press secretary for the first lady (2021–2022) (Democratic)
- Jamie Metzl, former director for Multilateral and Humanitarian Affairs in the U.S. National Security Council (1997–1999) (Democratic)
- JD Vance, vice president of the United States (2025–present)

U.S. senators

- John Cornyn, Texas (2002–present)
- Ted Cruz, Texas (2013–present)
- John Kennedy, Louisiana (2017–present)
- Joe Manchin, former West Virginia (2010–2025) (Independent; Democratic until 2024)
- Bernie Moreno, Ohio (2025–present)
- Tim Sheehy, Montana (2025–present)

U.S. representatives

- Hansen Clarke, former MI-13 (2011–2013) (Democratic)
- Bill Huizenga, MI-04 (2011–present)
- Mike Johnson, Speaker of the United States House of Representatives (2023–present) from LA-04 (2017–present)
- Haley Stevens, MI-11 (2019–present) and primary candidate for this seat (Democratic; previously endorsed El-Sayed)
- Fred Upton, former MI-06 (1987–2023)

Statewide officials

- Bill Schuette, former attorney general of Michigan (2011–2019) and nominee for U.S. Senate in 1990

State legislators

- Matt Hall, speaker of the Michigan House of Representatives (2025–present) from HD-42 (2019–present)
- Marty Knollenberg, former SD-13 (2015–2019)
- Ed McBroom, SD-38 (2019–present)
- Aric Nesbitt, minority leader of the Michigan Senate (2023–present) from SD-20 (2023–present)
- David Prestin, HD-108 (2023–present)
- Karen Whitsett, HD-04 (2019–present) (Democratic)

Local officials

- William Federspiel, Saginaw County sheriff (2009–present) (elected as a Democrat)

Party officials

- Bobby Schostak, former chair of the Michigan Republican Party (2011–2015)

Individuals

- Jake Lang, far-right activist
- Asher Lopatin, rabbi
- Nicki Minaj, Trinidadian rapper

Organizations

- AIPAC
- America First Works
- Associated General Contractors of America
- ~~CatholicVote.org~~ (rescinded endorsement)
- Detroit Regional Chamber PAC
- Michigan Chamber of Commerce
- National Federation of Independent Business
- National Republican Senatorial Committee
- National Roofing Contractors Association
- NRA Political Victory Fund
- Republican Jewish Coalition
- Safari Club International
- Senate Leadership Fund
- Tea Party Patriots Citizens Fund
- The Conservative Caucus
- Turning Point Action

Newspapers

- The Detroit News
Declined to endorse

U.S. senators

- John Fetterman, Pennsylvania (2023–present) (Democratic)

U.S. representatives

- Josh Gottheimer, NJ-05 (2017–present) (Democratic)
- Hillary Scholten, MI-03 (2023–present) (Democratic)

State legislators

- Noah Arbit, HD-20 (2023–present) (Democratic)

Local officials

- Mary D. Waters, member of the Detroit City Council (2022–present) (Democratic)

Party officials

- Lon Johnson, former chair of the Michigan Democratic Party (2013–2015) (Democratic)

=== Debates and forum ===
2026 Michigan U.S. Senate election debates and forum
No.	Date	Host	Moderator	Link	Democratic	Republican
Key: P Participant A Absent N Not invited I Invited W Withdrawn						
Key: P Participant A Absent N Not invited I Invited W Withdrawn					El-Sayed	Rogers
1	September 15, 2026	Fox 2 Detroit; Michigan Debate Commission	Roop Raj	YouTube	P	A
2	October 8, 2026	WOOD-TV	Rick Albin	YouTube	P	P
3	October 20, 2026	Detroit Economic Club	Jason Colthorp	YouTube	P	P
4	October 21, 2026	WXYZ-TV	Chuck Stokes; Carolyn Clifford; Alicia Smith	YouTube	P	P

=== Fundraising ===
Campaign finance reports as of October 14, 2026
Candidate	Raised	Spent	Cash on hand
Abdul El-Sayed (D)	$53,830,872	$51,096,843	$2,734,029
Mike Rogers (R)	$23,016,439	$19,369,637	$3,902,506
Source: Federal Election Commission

=== Polling ===
View source data.

Aggregate polls

Source of poll aggregation	Dates administered	Dates updated	Abdul El-Sayed (D)	Mike Rogers (R)	Other/ Undecided (Note: Calculated by taking the difference of 100% and all other candidates combined.)	Margin
270toWin	October 8 – November 1, 2026	November 3, 2026	50.8%	44.9%	4.3%	El-Sayed +5.9%
Decision Desk HQ	through November 2, 2026	November 3, 2026	50.1%	45.5%	4.4%	El-Sayed +4.6%
FiftyPlusOne	through November 2, 2026	November 3, 2026	50.5%	45.0%	4.5%	El-Sayed +5.5%
RealClearPolitics	October 15 – November 1, 2026	November 2, 2026	50.3%	45.0%	4.7%	El-Sayed +5.3%
Silver Bulletin	through November 2, 2026	November 3, 2026	50.3%	45.4%	4.3%	El-Sayed +4.9%
Average			50.4%	45.2%	4.4%	El-Sayed +5.2%

Poll source	Date(s) administered	Sample size	Margin of error	Abdul El-Sayed (D)	Mike Rogers (R)	Other	Undecided
John Zogby Strategies	October 31 – November 2, 2026	1,001 (LV)	± 3.2%	51%	49%	—	—
Emerson College (Note: Poll sponsored by Poll Vault, a Substack newsletter authored by Sean Trende.)	October 31 – November 1, 2026	500 (LV)	± 4.4%	51%	45%	3% (Note: Lydia Christensen (L) with 3%; Walter Kristy (NL) with 0%; Douglas P. Marsh (G) with 0%)	—
Trafalgar Group (R)	October 31 – November 1, 2026	1,087 (LV)	± 2.9%	47%	46%	3% (Note: Lydia Christensen (L) with 2%; Tim Long (T) with 0%; Douglas P. Marsh (G) with 0%)	5%
Concord Public Opinion Partners (D)	October 31 – November 1, 2026	510 (LV)	± 4.3%	51%	41%	3% (Note: "Someone else" with 3%)	5%
HarrisX	October 30 – November 1, 2026	663 (LV)	± 3.8%	48%	45%	4% (Note: "Another candidate" with 4%)	2%
Research Co.	October 30 – November 1, 2026	450 (LV)	± 4.6%	48%	46%	1% (Note: "Some other candidate" with 1%)	5%
AtlasIntel	October 28 – November 1, 2026	1,316 (LV)	± 3.0%	54%	46%	0%	0%
New York Times/Siena University	October 23 – November 1, 2026	1,011 (LV)	± 3.8%	53%	42%	0% (Note: "Another candidate" with 0%)	6%
Rasmussen Reports (R)	October 28–29, 2026	745 (LV)	± 3.0%	49%	44%	3% (Note: Lydia Christensen (L) with 2%; Tim Long (UST) with 1%; Douglas P. Marsh (G) with 0%; Walter Kristy (NL) with 0%)	4%
YouGov	October 26–29, 2026	2,093 (LV)	± 3.0%	51%	47%	2% (Note: "Someone else" with 1%; "I would not vote" with 1%)	1%
Upswing Research (D) (Note: Poll sponsored by Demand Justice)	October 24–28, 2026	505 (LV)	± 4.4%	50%	45%	—	5%
Mitchell Research & Communications (Note: Poll conducted for CBS Detroit.)	October 26–27, 2026	636 (LV)	± 3.9%	51%	44%	2%	3%
SSRS (Note: Poll conducted for CNN)	October 20–27, 2026	768 (LV)	± 4.7%	49%	42%	8% (Note: "Neither" with 5%)	1%
Data for Progress (D)	October 23–25, 2026	622 (LV)	± 4.0%	50%	46%	2% (Note: Lydia Christensen (L) with 1%; Tim Long (UST) with 1%; Douglas Marsh (G) with 0%; Walter Kristy (NL) with 0%)	3%
RedBox Research (D) (Note: Sponsored by A Fight Worth Having, a Democratic-aligned Super PAC)	October 20–23, 2026	2,696 (LV)	± 3.5%	49%	44%	4% (Note: Lydia Christensen (L) with 1%; Tim Long (UST) with 1%; "Someone else" with 1%; "Prefer not to answer" with 1%: Douglas Marsh (G) with 0%; Walter Kristy (NL) with 0%; "Did not vote in this race" with 0%)	3%
Michigan State University/Verasight	October 8–23, 2026	1,383 (LV)	± 2.9%	51%	43%	7%	—
Michigan State University/Verasight	October 8–23, 2026	1,383 (LV)	± 2.9%	48%	42%	3%	10%
InsiderAdvantage (R)	October 21–22, 2026	1,200 (LV)	± 2.8%	47%	46%	4% (Note: Lydia Christensen (L) with 1%; Douglas Marsh (G) with 1%; Tim Long (UST) with 1%; Walter Kristy (NL) with 1%)	3%
Glengariff Group (Note: Poll conducted for The Detroit News and WDIV-TV)	October 19–22, 2026	600 (LV)	± 4.0%	51%	45%	0%	4%
Michigan State University/YouGov	October 2–19, 2026	836 (LV)	± 4.4%	48%	46%	7%	
Michigan State University/YouGov	October 2–19, 2026	836 (LV)	± 4.4%	48%	44%	8%	
Michigan State University/YouGov	October 2–19, 2026	1,000 (A)	± 4.1%	45%	41%	14%	
Michigan State University/YouGov	October 2–19, 2026	1,000 (A)	± 4.1%	44%	39%	17%	
Marist University	October 15–18, 2026	— (LV)	± 4.3%	50%	48%	1%	2%
Marist University	October 15–18, 2026	1,185 (RV)	± 4.0%	52%	45%	1%	2%
Rasmussen Reports (R)	October 12–14, 2026	798 (LV)	± 3.0%	46%	44%	5% (Note: Lydia Christensen (L) with 2%; Tim Long (UST) with 2%; Douglas Marsh (G) with 1%; Walter Kristy (NL) with 0%)	5%
InsiderAdvantage (R)	October 9–10, 2026	1,200 (LV)	± 2.8%	48%	46%	1% (Note: Christensen (L) with 1%; Marsh (G) with <1%; Long (UST) with <1%)	5%
The Tyson Group (R) (Note: Poll sponsored by Alliance for a Better Future)	October 6–8, 2026	600 (LV)	—	44%	46%	—	—
Quantus Insights (R)	October 5–6, 2026	762 (LV)	± 3.9%	48%	47%	2% (Note: Lydia Christensen (L) with 1%; Douglas Marsh (G) with 1%; Tim Long (UST) with 0%)	4%
Quantus Insights (R)	October 5–6, 2026	762 (LV)	± 3.9%	51%	49%	—	—
YouGov	September 22 – October 4, 2026	3,949 (LV)	± 2.5%	49%	48%	1%	2%
Mitchell Research & Communications	October 1, 2026	682 (LV)	± 3.8%	46%	41%	7% (Note: Lydia Christensen (L) with 3%; Walter P. Kristy (NL) with 2%; Tim Long (T) & Douglas P. Marsh (G) with 1%)	6%
Z to A Research (D) (Note: Poll sponsored by Rust Belt Rising, which supports Democrats)	September 28 – October 1, 2026	483 (LV)	–	49%	42%	3% (Note: Lydia Christensen (L) with 3%)	3%
Trafalgar Group (R)	September 28–30, 2026	1,085 (LV)	± 2.9%	47%	45%	3% (Note: Lydia Christensen (L) with 2%; Tim Long (T) with 1%; Douglas P. Marsh (G) & Walter P. Kristy (NL) with 0%)	5%
Beacon Research (D)/ Shaw & Co. Research (R) (Note: Poll conducted for Fox News)	September 24–28, 2026	1,028 (LV)	± 3.0%	50%	49%	—	1%
Beacon Research (D)/ Shaw & Co. Research (R)	September 24–28, 2026	1,203 (RV)	± 2.5%	51%	48%	—	1%
The Tyson Group (R)	September 24–27, 2026	600 (LV)	—	44%	43%	—	—
Marist University	September 24–27, 2026	1,235 (RV)	± 3.8%	51%	44%	1%	3%
Guidant Polling & Strategy	September 20–27, 2026	800 (LV)	± 3.5%	48%	43%	2% (Note: Lydia Christensen (L) with 1%; Tim Long (UST) with 1%; Douglas Marsh (G) with 0%; Walter Kristy (NL) with 0%)	7%
Guidant Polling & Strategy	September 20–27, 2026	800 (LV)	± 3.5%	49%	45%	—	6%
Big Data Poll (R) (Note: Poll sponsored by the Public Polling Project)	September 22–24, 2026	678 (LV)	± 4.0%	47%	42%	—	11%
Big Data Poll (R)	September 22–24, 2026	678 (LV)	± 4.0%	46%	40%	—	14%
Big Data Poll (R)	September 22–24, 2026	725 (RV)	± 4.0%	44%	39%	—	17%
co/efficient (R)	September 21–23, 2026	843 (LV)	± 3.4%	45%	45%	2% (Note: Lydia Christensen (L) with 2%; Timothy Long (UST) & Douglas Marsh (G) with 0%)	8%
co/efficient (R)	September 21–23, 2026	843 (LV)	± 3.4%	50%	50%	—	—
GBAO (D)	September 19–22, 2026	800 (LV)	—	48%	44%	—	8%
New York Times/Siena University	September 15–22, 2026	605 (LV)	± 4.9%	49%	44%	—	7%
Cygnal (R)/Beacon Research (D) (Note: Poll sponsored by Michigan Enjoyer)	September 18–21, 2026	600 (LV)	± 4.0%	45%	40%	1% (Note: Lydia Christensen (L) with 1%; Walter Kristy (NL) & Tim Long (UST) with <1%; Douglas Marsh (G) with 0%)	13%
Suffolk University	September 16–20, 2026	500 (LV)	± 4.4%	47%	40%	3% (Note: Christensen (L) with 1%; Kristy (NL) with 1%; Long (UST) with 0%; Marsh (G) with 0%; Write-in with 1%)	8%
Torchlight Strategies (R) (Note: Poll sponsored by Common Sense for America PAC, which supports Republicans)	September 15–19, 2026	643 (LV)	± 4.7%	43%	44%	4%	9%
InsiderAdvantage (R)	September 16–17, 2026	1,200 (LV)	± 2.8%	47%	45%	3% (Note: Christensen (L) with 1%; Long (UST) with 1%; Marsh (G) with 1%)	5%
Emerson College	September 12–14, 2026	1,000 (LV)	± 3.0%	48%	46%	2% (Note: Long (UST) with 1%; Christensen (L) with 1%; Marsh (G) with <1%; Kristy (NL) with <1%)	4%
The Washington Post/SSPG	September 10–14, 2026	803 (LV)	± 3.9%	48%	45%	5% (Note: "Would not vote" with 3%; "Someone else" with 2%)	2%
Trafalgar Group (R)	September 7–9, 2026	1,079 (LV)	± 2.9%	46%	45%	2% (Note: Lydia Christensen (L) with 1%; Tim Long (T) with 1%; Douglas P. Marsh (G) with 0%; Walter P. Kristy (NL) with 0%)	7%
SSRS	August 31 – September 6, 2026	843 (LV)	± 4.1%	47%	44%	8% (Note: "Neither" with 5%)	—
Glengariff Group	August 31 – September 3, 2026	600 (LV)	± 4.0%	44%	46%	—	9%
Abacus Data	August 26–28, 2026	332 (LV)	—	49%	45%	6% (Note: "Another candidate" with 6%)	—
Abacus Data	August 26–28, 2026	500 (RV)	± 4.4%	48%	41%	11% (Note: "Another candidate" with 11%)	—
EPIC-MRA	August 22–28, 2026	600 (LV)	± 4.0%	50%	45%	—	5%
EPIC-MRA	August 22–28, 2026	600 (LV)	± 4.0%	47%	43%	—	10%
Michigan State University/YouGov	August 10–20, 2026	779 (LV)	± 3.4%	50%	45%	—	5%
Michigan State University/YouGov	August 10–20, 2026	913 (RV)	± 3.4%	48%	44%	—	8%
Susquehanna Polling & Research (R)	August 11–17, 2026	800 (LV)	± 3.5%	46%	39%	6% (Note: Other with 4%; Refuse with 2%)	9%
Fabrizio Ward (R)/ Impact Research (D) (Note: Poll commissioned by AARP)	August 9–11, 2026	877 (LV)	± 3.3%	48%	47%	—	5%
TIPP Insights (R)	August 6–10, 2026	1,528 (RV)	± 2.6%	43%	39%	7% (Note: "Someone else" with 7%)	11%
TIPP Insights (R)	August 6–10, 2026	1,215 (LV)	± 2.7%	45%	42%	7%	6%
GBAO (D) (Note: Poll sponsored by Senate Majority PAC, which is focused on electing Democrats to the U.S. Senate)	August 6–10, 2026	800 (LV)	± 3.5%	50%	44%	—	6%
Beacon Research (D)/ Shaw & Co. Research (R)	August 6–10, 2026	1,006 (RV)	± 3.0%	47%	51%	—	2%
	August 4, 2026	Primary elections					
EPIC-MRA	July 24–31, 2026	600 (LV)	± 4.0%	43%	46%	—	11%
SoCal Strategies (R)	July 28–30, 2026	640 (LV)	± 3.8%	41%	42%	—	17%
Mitchell Research & Communications	July 28–29, 2026	672 (LV)	± 3.8%	45%	45%	—	10%
Glengariff Group (Note: Poll commissioned jointly by the Michigan Education Association and Business Leaders for Michigan.)	July 22–24, 2026	600 (LV)	± 4.0%	39%	49%	1%	11%
Quantus Insights (R)	June 29–30, 2026	947 (LV)	± 3.3%	45%	44%	3%	8%
Data for Progress (D) (Note: Poll sponsored by the Working Families Party, which supports El-Sayed)	June 15–22, 2026	709 (LV)	± 4.0%	47%	46%	—	7%
Zenith Research (D) (Note: Poll commissioned by Common Defense, which supports El-Sayed)	June 11–14, 2026	602 (LV)	± 4.0%	45%	42%	—	13%
Mitchell Research & Communications	June 11–13, 2026	827 (LV)	± 3.4%	47%	42%	—	11%
Tulchin Research (D)	June 2–4, 2026	500 (LV)	± 4.4%	46%	41%	—	13%
TIPP Insights (R)	May 20–23, 2026	1,456 (RV)	± 2.7%	40%	40%	7%	13%
TIPP Insights (R)	May 20–23, 2026	1,163 (LV)	± 3.0%	43%	42%	6% (Note: "Someone else" with 6%)	9%
Mitchell Research	May 1–7, 2026	607 (LV)	± 6.0%	41%	42%	—	17%
Glengariff Group	April 28 – May 1, 2026	600 (LV)	± 4.0%	40%	45%	—	15%
Glengariff Group	April 28 – May 1, 2026	600 (LV)	± 4.0%	42%	45%	—	13%
Emerson College	January 24–25, 2026	1,000 (LV)	± 3.0%	43%	43%	—	14%
Glengariff Group	January 2–6, 2026	600 (LV)	± 4.0%	47%	43%	—	10%
Glengariff Group	January 2–6, 2026	600 (LV)	± 4.0%	42%	48%	—	10%
Mitchell Research & Communications	November 18–21, 2025	616 (LV)	± 3.7%	38%	41%	—	22%
Rosetta Stone Communications (R)	October 23–25, 2025	637 (LV)	± 3.9%	31%	45%	—	24%
Glengariff Group	May 5–8, 2025	600 (RV)	± 4.0%	41%	47%	—	12%
Glengariff Group	May 5–8, 2025	600 (RV)	± 4.0%	45%	47%	—	8%

Hypothetical polling

Haley Stevens vs. Mike Rogers

Poll source	Date(s) administered	Sample size	Margin of error	Haley Stevens (D)	Mike Rogers (R)	Other	Undecided
EPIC-MRA	July 24–31, 2026	600 (LV)	± 4.0%	44%	42%	—	14%
SoCal Strategies (R)	July 28–30, 2026	640 (LV)	± 3.8%	44%	42%	—	14%
Mitchell Research & Communications	July 28–29, 2026	672 (LV)	± 3.8%	43%	46%	—	11%
Glengariff Group	July 22–24, 2026	600 (LV)	± 4.0%	46%	45%	—	9%
Quantus Insights (R)	June 29–30, 2026	947 (LV)	± 3.3%	45%	44%	3%	8%
Data for Progress (D)	June 15–22, 2026	709 (LV)	± 4.0%	45%	46%	—	9%
Zenith Research (D)	June 11–14, 2026	602 (LV)	± 4.0%	43%	42%	—	13%
Mitchell Research & Communications	June 11–13, 2026	827 (LV)	± 3.4%	41%	45%	—	13%
TIPP Insights (R)	May 20–23, 2026	1,456 (RV)	± 2.7%	45%	38%	6%	11%
TIPP Insights (R)	May 20–23, 2026	1,163 (LV)	± 3.0%	48%	41%	5% (Note: "Someone else" with 5%)	6%
Mitchell Research	May 1–7, 2026	607 (LV)	± 6.0%	39%	42%	—	19%
Glengariff Group	April 28 – May 1, 2026	600 (LV)	± 4.0%	42%	44%	—	15%
Glengariff Group	April 28 – May 1, 2026	600 (LV)	± 4.0%	44%	44%	—	11%
Emerson College	January 24–25, 2026	1,000 (LV)	± 3.0%	47%	42%	—	11%
Glengariff Group	January 2–6, 2026	600 (LV)	± 4.0%	47%	42%	—	11%
Glengariff Group	January 2–6, 2026	600 (LV)	± 4.0%	44%	44%	—	12%
Mitchell Research & Communications	November 18–21, 2025	616 (LV)	± 3.7%	40%	42%	—	18%
EPIC-MRA	November 6–11, 2025	600 (RV)	± 4.0%	44%	42%	—	14%
Rosetta Stone Communications (R)	October 23–25, 2025	637 (LV)	± 3.9%	40%	47%	—	13%
Normington Petts (D) (Note: Poll sponsored by Yes Michigan Super PAC)	June 12–16, 2025	700 (LV)	± 3.7%	47%	45%	—	8%
Glengariff Group	May 5–8, 2025	600 (RV)	± 4.0%	45%	44%	—	11%
Glengariff Group	May 5–8, 2025	600 (RV)	± 4.0%	49%	43%	—	8%
Target Insyght	March 3–6, 2025	600 (V)	± 4.0%	35%	41%	—	24%

Mallory McMorrow vs. Mike Rogers

Poll source	Date(s) administered	Sample size	Margin of error	Mallory McMorrow (D)	Mike Rogers (R)	Other	Undecided
Quantus Insights (R)	June 29–30, 2026	947 (LV)	± 3.3%	44%	45%	3%	8%
Zenith Research (D)	June 11–14, 2026	602 (LV)	± 4.0%	44%	42%	—	13%
Mitchell Research & Communications	June 11–13, 2026	827 (LV)	± 3.4%	41%	47%	—	12%
TIPP Insights (R)	May 20–23, 2026	1,456 (RV)	± 2.7%	42%	39%	6%	13%
TIPP Insights (R)	May 20–23, 2026	1,163 (LV)	± 3.0%	45%	42%	5%	8%
Mitchell Research	May 1–7, 2026	607 (LV)	± 6.0%	41%	43%	—	16%
Glengariff Group	April 28 – May 1, 2026	600 (LV)	± 4.0%	41%	43%	—	16%
Glengariff Group	April 28 – May 1, 2026	600 (LV)	± 4.0%	43%	43%	—	14%
Emerson College	January 24–25, 2026	1,000 (LV)	± 3.0%	46%	43%	—	11%
Glengariff Group	January 2–6, 2026	600 (LV)	± 4.0%	46%	43%	—	11%
Glengariff Group	January 2–6, 2026	600 (LV)	± 4.0%	42%	46%	—	12%
Mitchell Research & Communications	November 18–21, 2025	616 (LV)	± 3.7%	38%	44%	—	19%
EPIC-MRA	November 6–11, 2025	600 (RV)	± 4.0%	43%	42%	—	15%
Rosetta Stone Communications (R)	October 23–25, 2025	637 (LV)	± 3.9%	39%	46%	—	15%
Normington Petts (D)	June 12–16, 2025	700 (LV)	± 3.7%	44%	48%	—	8%
Glengariff Group	May 5–8, 2025	600 (RV)	± 4.0%	42%	46%	—	12%
Glengariff Group	May 5–8, 2025	600 (RV)	± 4.0%	46%	44%	—	10%

Haley Stevens vs. Bill Huizenga

Poll source	Date(s) administered	Sample size	Margin of error	Haley Stevens (D)	Bill Huizenga (R)	Other / Undecided
Glengariff Group	May 5–8, 2025	600 (RV)	± 4.0%	45%	39%	16%
Glengariff Group	May 5–8, 2025	600 (RV)	± 4.0%	48%	39%	13%

Abdul El-Sayed vs. Bill Huizenga

Poll source	Date(s) administered	Sample size	Margin of error	Abdul El-Sayed (D)	Bill Huizenga (R)	Other / Undecided
Glengariff Group	May 5–8, 2025	600 (RV)	± 4.0%	41%	41%	18%
Glengariff Group	May 5–8, 2025	600 (RV)	± 4.0%	44%	41%	15%

Mallory McMorrow vs. Bill Huizenga

Poll source	Date(s) administered	Sample size	Margin of error	Mallory McMorrow (D)	Bill Huizenga (R)	Other / Undecided
Glengariff Group	May 5–8, 2025	600 (RV)	± 4.0%	41%	41%	18%
Glengariff Group	May 5–8, 2025	600 (RV)	± 4.0%	45%	40%	15%

Dana Nessel vs. Mike Rogers

Poll source	Date(s) administered	Sample size	Margin of error	Dana Nessel (D)	Mike Rogers (R)	Other / Undecided
Mitchell Research	March 13, 2025	688 (LV)	± 3.7%	45%	44%	11%

Dana Nessel vs. Tudor Dixon

Poll source	Date(s) administered	Sample size	Margin of error	Dana Nessel (D)	Tudor Dixon (R)	Other / Undecided
Mitchell Research	March 13, 2025	688 (LV)	± 3.7%	45%	45%	10%

Pete Buttigieg vs. Mike Rogers

Poll source	Date(s) administered	Sample size	Margin of error	Pete Buttigieg (D)	Mike Rogers (R)	Other / Undecided
Target Insyght	March 3–6, 2025	600 (V)	± 4.0%	46%	44%	10%
EPIC-MRA	February 3–8, 2025	600 (V)	± 4.0%	41%	47%	12%

Gretchen Whitmer vs. Brian Posthumus

Poll source	Date(s) administered	Sample size	Margin of error	Gretchen Whitmer (D)	Brian Posthumus (R)	Other / Undecided
Mitchell Research	March 13, 2025	688 (LV)	± 3.7%	47%	41%	12%

Gretchen Whitmer vs. Mike Rogers

Poll source	Date(s) administered	Sample size	Margin of error	Gretchen Whitmer (D)	Mike Rogers (R)	Other / Undecided
Mitchell Research	March 13, 2025	688 (LV)	± 3.7%	47%	44%	9%
Target Insyght	March 3–6, 2025	600 (V)	± 4.0%	42%	41%	17%

Gretchen Whitmer vs. Peter Meijer

Poll source	Date(s) administered	Sample size	Margin of error	Gretchen Whitmer (D)	Peter Meijer (R)	Other / Undecided
Mitchell Research	March 13, 2025	688 (LV)	± 3.7%	46%	40%	14%

Gretchen Whitmer vs. Tudor Dixon

Poll source	Date(s) administered	Sample size	Margin of error	Gretchen Whitmer (D)	Tudor Dixon (R)	Other / Undecided
Mitchell Research	March 13, 2025	688 (LV)	± 3.7%	47%	46%	7%

Generic Democrat vs. Mike Rogers

Poll source	Date(s) administered	Sample size	Margin of error	Generic Democrat	Mike Rogers (R)	Undecided
GQR (D)	June 13–18, 2026	800 (LV)	± 3.5%	50%	42%	8%

=== Results ===
2026 United States Senate election in Michigan
Party	Candidate	Votes	%	±%
Democratic	Abdul El-Sayed	2,521,693	52.56	+2.66
Republican	Mike Rogers	2,180,388	45.44	−2.76
Libertarian	Lydia Christensen	49,692	1.04	+1.04
U.S. Taxpayers	Tim Long	26,534	0.55	+0.55
Green	Douglas P. Marsh	12,553	0.26	−0.46
Natural Law	Walter P. Kristy	7,253	0.15	−0.09
Write-in		10	0.00	±0.00
Total votes		4,798,123	100.0	
Democratic hold				

==== Counties that flipped from Republican to Democratic ====
- Grand Traverse (largest municipality: Traverse City)
- Isabella (largest municipality: Mount Pleasant)
- Kent (largest municipality: Grand Rapids)
- Leelanau (largest municipality: Greilickville)
- Muskegon (largest municipality: Muskegon)

==== By congressional district ====
El-Sayed won nine congressional districts, while Rogers won four.

District	El-Sayed	Rogers	Representative
1st	41.81%	55.87%	Jack Bergman
2nd	37.08%	60.33%	John Moolenaar
3rd	56.87%	41.27%	Hillary Scholten
4th	49.32%	48.70%	Bill Huizenga (119th Congress)
4th	49.32%	48.70%	Sean McCann (120th Congress)
5th	38.94%	58.66%	Tim Walberg
6th	64.80%	33.76%	Debbie Dingell
7th	51.85%	46.42%	Tom Barrett (119th Congress)
7th	51.85%	46.42%	William Lawrence (120th Congress)
8th	51.56%	46.11%	Kristen McDonald Rivet
9th	36.00%	62.06%	Lisa McClain
10th	51.89%	46.21%	John James (119th Congress)
10th	51.89%	46.21%	Christina Hines (120th Congress)
11th	58.96%	39.42%	Haley Stevens (119th Congress)
11th	58.96%	39.42%	Jeremy Moss (120th Congress)
12th	75.82%	22.23%	Rashida Tlaib
13th	75.45%	22.40%	Shri Thanedar (119th Congress)
13th	75.45%	22.40%	Donavan McKinney (120th Congress)

== Analysis ==
Michigan's general election was deemed one of the races that would help decide control of the Senate in the 120th United States Congress.

=== Exit poll ===
2026 Michigan United States Senate election (CNN)
Demographic subgroup	El-Sayed	Rogers	% of total vote
Ideology
Liberals	95	4	26
Moderates	60	37	41
Conservatives	10	88	33
Party
Democrats	94	4	32
Republicans	5	93	33
Independents	58	39	35
Donald Trump job approval
Approve	4	95	37
Disapprove	83	15	61
2024 presidential vote
Kamala Harris	95	4	45
Donald Trump	6	92	44
Another candidate	56	31	3
Did not vote	83	15	6
Gender
Men	48	51	46
Women	56	41	53
Income
$100,000 or more	51	47	35
$50,000-$99,999	53	45	34
Less than $50,000	54	44	31
Race/ethnicity
White	48	51	81
Latino	57	40	3
Black	86	11	9
White born-again or evangelical Christian?
Yes	14	84	17
No	61	37	83
Race by gender
White men	44	54	38
White women	50	48	42
Black men	86	13	4
Black women	87	10	6
All other voters	65	33	10
Age
18–29 years old	69	28	13
30–44 years old	58	39	21
45–64 years old	45	53	33
65 and older	49	49	33
Area type
Urban	73	25	14
Suburban	56	42	46
Rural	41	57	41
Education
College graduate	60	38	41
No college degree	47	50	59
Education by race
White college graduates	58	40	34
Non-white college graduates	70	27	7
Whites without college	40	58	47
Non-whites without college	76	22	12
Education by gender and race
White women with college degrees	63	36	17
White women without college degrees	42	55	25
White men with college degrees	53	46	16
White men without college degrees	37	61	22
Voters of color	74	24	20
Educational attainment
Advanced degree	66	32	17
Bachelor's degree	56	42	24
Associate's degree	51	47	14
Some college	48	50	23
Never attended college	45	53	23

== Notes ==
Partisan clients
