= Elect Democratic Women =

American political organization

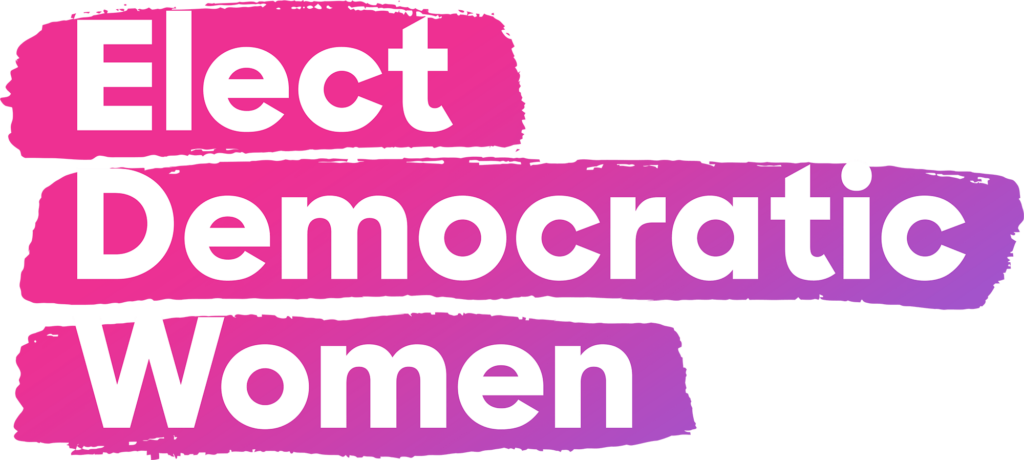
- Formation: 2018; 8 years ago
- Founders: Joyce Beatty; Julia Brownley; Cheri Bustos; Katherine Clark; Lois Frankel; Annie Kuster; Lucille Roybal-Allard
- Purpose: To elect Democratic pro-choice women to office
- Headquarters: Washington, D.C., U.S.
- Chair: Lois Frankel
- Budget: $11.28 million (2024)
- Revenue: $11.73 million (2024)
- Website: electdemocraticwomen.org

Elect Democratic Women is an American political action committee (PAC) which helps elect female Democratic pro-choice candidates to office. It was founded by seven congresswomen (Note: Joyce Beatty, Julia Brownley, Cheri Bustos, Katherine Clark, Lois Frankel, Annie Kuster and Lucille Roybal-Allard) in 2018.

The group primarily supports female candidates in competitive districts who are "capable of raising money". One of their primary strategies is to connect donors directly to campaigns, rather than running advertisements for candidates.

== History ==
The organization was founded in preparation for the 2018 midterms by seven female House Democrats. It was inspired by the successful fundraising arms of the Democratic-aligned Congressional Hispanic Caucus and Congressional Black Caucus.

Campaign watchdog group OpenSecrets reported that the group had raised a record US$11.73 million in the 2024 election cycle, up from $7.89 million in 2022 and $8.5 million in 2020. Speaking to The 19th, founding member Lois Frankel said the group aim to have 100 women simultaneously serving in the U.S. House after the 2026 midterms, up from 94 women in 2025.

In 2024, Frankel stated that Elect Democratic Women had supported the campaigns of "nearly every Democratic woman elected to Congress since 2018." By 2026, Elect Democratic Women had raised over $40 million and supported over 200 female candidates running for office. The group is affiliated with the Democratic Congressional Campaign Committee's Red to Blue program, which financially supports candidates with a viable chance of beating Republican incumbents.

Elect Democratic Women's affiliated super PAC, EDW Action Fund, received $1 million from the United Democracy Project, an AIPAC-affiliated super PAC, and $37,750 from Democratic Majority for Israel in 2026.

== Endorsements ==
=== 2018 ===
In the 2018 midterm elections, Elect Democratic Women supported Chrissy Houlahan (PA-06), Mikie Sherrill (NJ-11), Elaine Luria (VA-02), Elissa Slotkin (MI-08), Lauren Underwood (IL-14) and Katie Hill (CA-25) in their successful bids to flip Republican-held congressional districts.

=== 2020 ===
In 2020, Elect Democratic Women donated $100,000 to the Biden Victory Fund. They supported a number of challengers in traditionally Republican districts, including Patricia Timmons-Goodson in NC-08, Candace Valenzuela in TX-24 and Michelle De La Isla in KS-02. The group backed Xochitl Torres Small's unsuccessful re-election bid in NM-02, and Debbie Mucarsel-Powell's campaign in FL-26, though they helped re-elect Susan Wild (PA-07), Susie Lee (NV-03) and Abigail Spanberger (VA-07).

=== 2022 ===
Elect Democratic Women supported at least 93 female candidates in the 2022 midterm elections, including Emilia Sykes in her successful bid to flip OH-13 and Nikki Budzinski in IL-13. They helped re-elect Annie Kuster (NH-02) and Sharice Davids (KS-03), both of whom won in districts that voted Republican in consecutively-held races.

=== 2024 ===
The group endorsed Kamala Harris in the 2024 presidential election. They backed Mary Peltola's close unsuccessful re-election bid in AK-AL, and supported Christina Bohannan in IA-01, where she lost by less than 800 votes in a seat with a Cook Partisan Voting Index of R+4.

=== 2025 ===
In 2025, Elect Democratic Women endorsed Abigail Spanberger in the Virginia gubernatorial election, and Mikie Sherill in the New Jersey gubernatorial election. The group also endorsed Aftyn Behn in the special election for TN-07.

=== 2026 ===
Angie Craig of Minnesota and Haley Stevens of Michigan, both moderate Democrats, were supported by Elect Democratic Women in their 2026 U.S. Senate Democratic primary campaigns, as was Robin Kelly of Illinois, Mary Peltola of Alaska, and Janet Mills of Maine. The group endorsed former U.S. representative Melissa Bean, a centrist, in her bid to retake her old seat.
