= Ray Wert =

American editor

- Education: Michigan State University
- Occupations: Author, writer, journalist
- Spouse: Mallory McMorrow (m. 2017)
- Children: 1

Ray Wert is an American journalist who was formerly head of content sales at Gawker Media and the editor-in-chief of the Gawker-owned automotive weblog Jalopnik.

Wert was previously a senior staffer for Michigan Governor Jennifer Granholm and a campaign staffer for presidential candidate John Kerry. Wert has written for The New York Times, Popular Mechanics and Cat Fancy, and is a regular contributor to various CNBC shows such as On the Money. Wert splits his time between New York City and metro Detroit.

Wert provided on-screen commentary for the 2011 film Revenge of the Electric Car.

Wert is married to Michigan State Senator Mallory McMorrow. Their wedding was held in June 2017 in the Eastern Market district of Detroit. They have a daughter named Noa who was born in January 2021. They live in Royal Oak, Michigan. Wert is Jewish and McMorrow is Catholic.
