= Mallory McMorrow =

American politician (born 1986)

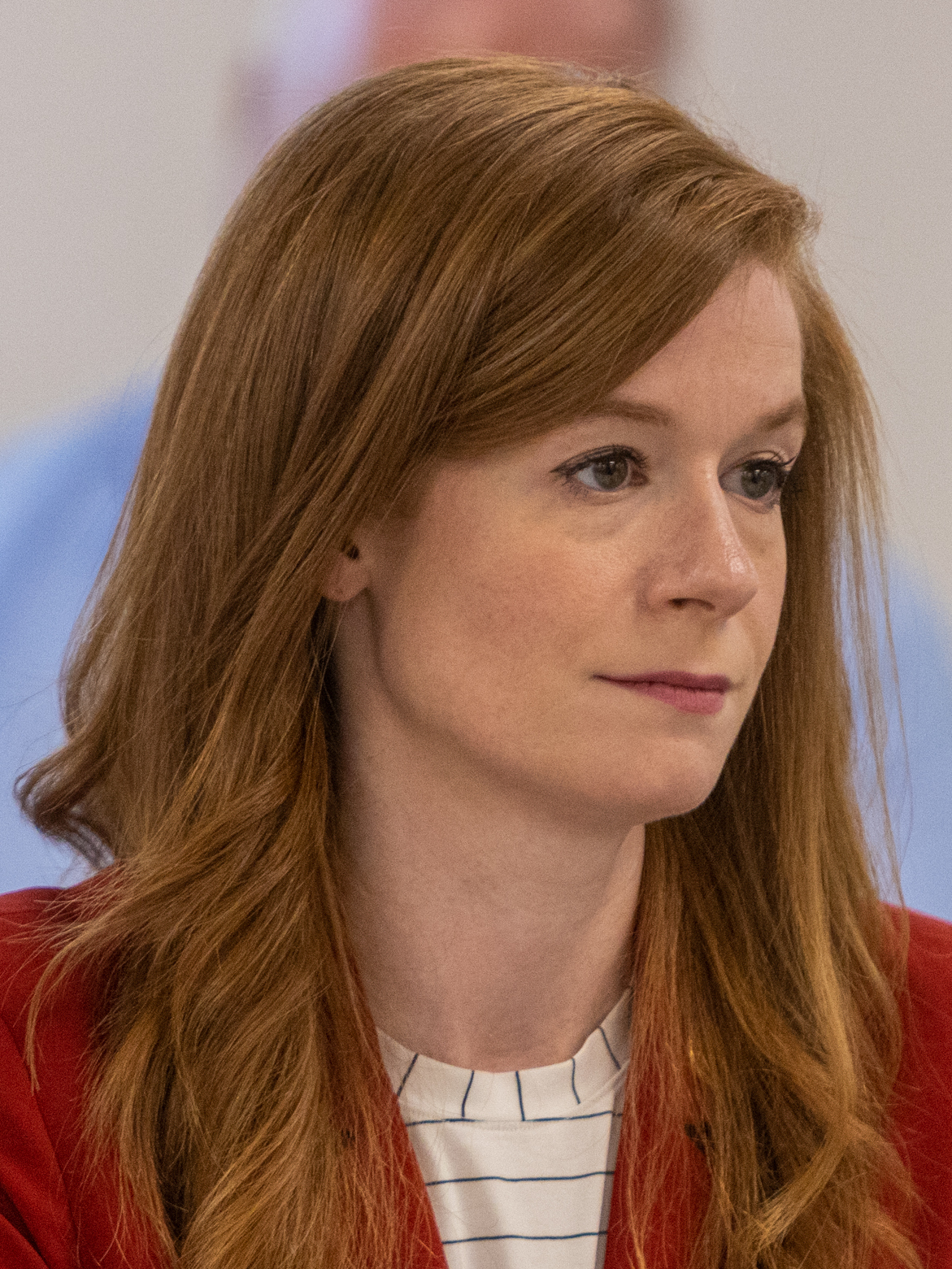
- McMorrow in 2023

Michigan Senate Democratic Caucus Whip
- Incumbent
- Assumed office January 1, 2023
- Leader: Winnie Brinks
- Preceded by: Winnie Brinks

Member of the Michigan Senate
- Incumbent
- Assumed office January 1, 2019
- Preceded by: Marty Knollenberg
- Constituency: 13th district (2019–2023); 8th district (2023–present)

Personal details
- Born: Mallory Ann McMorrow; August 23, 1986 (age 40) Morristown, New Jersey, U.S.
- Party: Democratic
- Spouse: Ray Wert (m. 2017)
- Children: 1
- Education: University of Notre Dame (BA)

Mallory Ann McMorrow (born August 23, 1986) is an American politician who has served in the Michigan Senate since January 2019. She became Senate majority whip on January 1, 2023. A member of the Democratic Party, she represents the 8th district; before that, from 2019 to 2023, she represented the 13th district. Prior to running for the Michigan Senate, McMorrow worked in industrial design.

McMorrow ran for the U.S. Senate in the 2026 election's Democratic primary to succeed incumbent Gary Peters. She suspended her campaign on July 5, 2026, without immediately endorsing either of her two remaining opponents, while saying that the eventual Democratic nominee would have her support. After Abdul El-Sayed won the primary, McMorrow endorsed him and called for Democrats to unite behind his candidacy.

== Early life and education ==
McMorrow was born on August 23, 1986, in Morristown, New Jersey, and grew up in Readington Township, New Jersey. She graduated from Hunterdon Central Regional High School in 2004. She was raised Roman Catholic and her family was active in their local parish; McMorrow has described her upbringing as Irish Catholic. She sang in the church choir, and her mother taught Confraternity of Christian Doctrine classes. McMorrow later said that after her parents divorced, she and her mother began spending Sundays volunteering at soup kitchens outside their diocese.

McMorrow received a Bachelor of Arts in industrial design from the University of Notre Dame in 2008. While at Notre Dame, she won a public design contest for a proposed 2018 version of the Mazda3. The competition drew more than 400 entries and included public voting; Mazda built a full-size prototype of her design for display at the 2007 Los Angeles Auto Show. She also finished second in a contest to design the logo for the Indiana Toll Road.

After graduation, McMorrow worked for design firms in New York and Los Angeles, as well as for Mattel and Gawker. At Mattel, she was a senior designer over global branding and licensing for Hot Wheels. She later moved to Michigan.

== Political career ==
McMorrow participated in the 2017 Women's March in Detroit and began writing postcards to Betsy DeVos, then the U.S. secretary of education, challenging positions of the Trump administration. She applied to Emerge America's Michigan chapter, which provides training to Democratic women seeking elected office, and completed its candidate-training program in 2017.

In 2018, McMorrow ran for the Michigan Senate, seeking to represent Michigan's 13th Senate district. She was unopposed in the Democratic Party's primary election, and faced incumbent Republican Senator Marty Knollenberg in the general election. McMorrow defeated Knollenberg, receiving 51.9 percent of the vote, with 73,146 votes to Knollenberg's 67,798. The victory flipped a seat that had been held by Republicans. Michigan Senate Democrats chose McMorrow to serve as the assistant minority floor leader for the 2019–2020 legislative session.

=== Michigan State Senate ===
In January 2020, McMorrow, lobbyist Melissa Osborn and Michigan Advance reporter Allison Donahue accused Republican state Senator Peter Lucido of sexual harassment. McMorrow stated that Lucido touched her lower back and upper buttocks in November 2018, shortly after she was elected to the state senate, and made comments during a training session that suggested she won her election because of her appearance. A Michigan Senate investigation later found all three complainants credible and concluded that it was "more likely than not" that each incident occurred as reported; Lucido was removed from the Senate Advice and Consent Committee and ordered to undergo additional training.

In June 2021, McMorrow co-sponsored the reintroduction of Senate Resolution 60, introduced by Senator Jeremy Moss, which proposed declaring June as Pride Month in Michigan. The resolution was adopted after similar recognition measures had failed in previous years.

In April 2022, Republican State Senator Lana Theis claimed in a campaign fundraising email that McMorrow wanted to "groom and sexualize kindergartners" and teach that "8-year-olds are responsible for slavery". McMorrow defended herself on April 19, 2022, on the senate floor.

"I am a straight, white, Christian, married, suburban mom who knows that the very notion that learning about slavery or redlining or systemic racism somehow means that children are being taught to feel bad or hate themselves because they are white is absolute nonsense."

— Mallory McMorrow, 2022

Neither Theis nor the Michigan Republican Party apologized for the accusation, and Theis did not respond to McMorrow's speech on the senate floor. McMorrow's speech went viral, receiving more than one million views within hours and millions of views across social-media platforms in the days that followed. The speech brought McMorrow national attention and was followed by television appearances and increased fundraising for Michigan Democratic legislative candidates.

During redistricting following the 2020 United States census, prior to the 2022 elections, Michigan's independent redistricting commission merged McMorrow's district with the district represented by fellow Democrat Marshall Bullock. In the primary election held August 2, 2022, McMorrow defeated Bullock for the Democratic Party's nomination for the 8th District, receiving 32,738 votes to Bullock's 15,093. McMorrow defeated Republican Brandon Ronald Simpson in the November general election, receiving 94,878 votes out of 120,187 cast. Since 2023, McMorrow has been the State Senate's Democratic caucus whip.

=== National politics ===
McMorrow endorsed Elizabeth Warren for President in 2019 and volunteered for Warren's 2020 presidential campaign in Michigan.

On August 19, 2024, McMorrow delivered a speech at the Democratic National Convention and brought out a giant copy of the roughly 900-page Project 2025. Democrats had made the Heritage Foundation-led policy project a recurring line of attack against Donald Trump during the campaign, while Trump said the project was not connected to his campaign. McMorrow said, "They went ahead and wrote down all the extreme things that Donald Trump wants to do in the next four years", and gave her support to Kamala Harris for president. McMorrow's debut book, Hate Won't Win: Find Your Power and Leave This Place Better Than You Found It, was published by Grand Central Publishing on March 25, 2025.

While expressing respect for Democratic Party leaders, McMorrow privately wrote to Joe Biden in July 2024 urging him to step down from the ticket and expressed the need for new leadership in the party in March 2025.

=== 2026 U.S. Senate campaign ===
In April 2025, McMorrow announced that she would run in the Democratic primary to replace United States Senator Gary Peters, who had announced he would not stand for re-election in 2026. In launching the campaign, she argued for generational change in the Democratic Party and emphasized her record in the Michigan Legislature. McMorrow had been advised by Democratic operative Lis Smith since 2022, after her April 2022 floor speech drew national attention.

During her campaign, McMorrow was endorsed by U.S. senators Peter Welch, Martin Heinrich, Chris Murphy, and Warren. She suspended her campaign on July 5, 2026, after fabricated polls by an organization called Wedgewood gained traction. McMorrow did not immediately endorse Abdul El-Sayed or Haley Stevens at the time, but said the Democratic nominee "will have my full support" in the general election. She endorsed El-Sayed after his victory in the August primary.

== Political positions ==
McMorrow has called herself a pragmatist, and said, "I don't know that I would be in office in my first district if I was at the far left end of the party, and I don't think that's what people are looking for right now." In April 2026, CNN reported that, prior to 2020, McMorrow had expressed more progressive views, including support for Black Lives Matter and criticism of Donald Trump and his supporters, in since-deleted social media posts.

=== Abortion ===
In July 2022, a month after the U.S. Supreme Court voted to overturn Roe v. Wade, McMorrow spoke about an emergency dilation and curettage (D&C) she had undergone that January to remove a malfunctioning IUD. She said the procedure had been medically necessary and expressed concern that restrictions on D&C and other procedures after the reversal of Roe could make similar care harder to obtain. McMorrow said she had been warned that without the procedure she risked infection, permanent reproductive harm, or death. She subsequently continued to advocate for abortion rights in the Michigan Legislature.

=== Data centers ===
In late 2024, McMorrow voted as a state senator for legislation providing sales- and use-tax exemptions to qualifying data centers in an effort to attract projects to Michigan. Under the resulting law, qualifying developers may receive the exemptions through at least 2050 if they meet investment, employment and other requirements; the law also included provisions intended to prevent residential utility customers from subsidizing data-center electricity costs. In 2026, she continued to support data-center development but proposed stronger requirements for developers to pay infrastructure and power costs, disclose water and energy usage, meet labor and renewable-energy standards, and "pay their fair share" in taxes.

=== Economic policy ===
As chairwoman of the Senate Economic and Community Development Committee, McMorrow pushed for more community investments in regional transit and childcare to supplement the state's reliance on providing incentives for large companies for economic development. She has also called for greater transparency around economic-development deals, including restrictions on nondisclosure agreements between local governments and companies negotiating major projects.

=== Health care ===
McMorrow favors a public option that would preserve private insurance while allowing people to choose a government-backed health plan; she has said she does not support replacing the existing system with Medicare for All. McMorrow has expressed support for hybrid public-option models, such as the Colorado Option, as examples of systems that retain private insurers while creating a government-regulated alternative.

=== Israeli–Palestinian conflict ===
McMorrow visited Israel in 2023. In April 2025, McMorrow reached out to pro-Israel Democratic groups to emphasize her support for Israel during her candidacy for the 2026 United States Senate election in Michigan and condemned alleged harassment and antisemitism directed at University of Michigan regents during pro-Palestinian protests. According to Jewish Insider, by April 2025, McMorrow had returned foreign-policy questionnaires to at least one pro-Israel Democratic group, emphasizing her commitment to Israel's security.

In a September 2025 interview with the Washington Examiner, McMorrow said that she had a respectful relationship with AIPAC; the outlet also reported that her husband, who is Jewish, had interned for AIPAC. McMorrow asked AIPAC not to intervene in the 2026 U.S. Senate Democratic primary in Michigan on behalf of Haley Stevens and said that she had been in contact with AIPAC and other pro-Israel groups. She said the groups had been "receptive" to her positions on Israel and argued that voters had become increasingly concerned about the influence of PAC spending. McMorrow denied seeking AIPAC's support or endorsement. She was endorsed by J Street in March 2026.

When initially asked about the role of the Israeli–Palestinian conflict in the Senate election, she responded that "two things can be true simultaneously ... that Hamas started a violent war, and that war needs to end." McMorrow expressed support for a two-state solution, for the return of hostages, and for providing humanitarian aid to Palestinians in Gaza, saying that peace had been a hallmark of Democratic foreign policy for decades.

McMorrow's positions on weapons transfers and U.S. support to Israel changed over the course of her Senate campaign as humanitarian conditions in Gaza worsened. In July 2025, international food-security experts warned that the "worst-case scenario of famine" was unfolding in Gaza and that humanitarian conditions had "dramatically worsened". In April 2025, McMorrow declined to say whether she would vote for additional security aid for Israel without conditions, saying she wanted to see the legislation first. In July 2025, McMorrow said the United States should stop providing Benjamin Netanyahu's government with offensive weapons as leverage until humanitarian aid resumed, called for Hamas to release all hostages and disarm, and said the parties should negotiate a permanent ceasefire. McMorrow continued to support defensive arms for Israel, including funding for the Iron Dome, while advocating conditioning further offensive arms transfers on the resumption of humanitarian aid.

Asked in October 2025 whether Israel's actions in Gaza legally met the definition of a genocide, McMorrow responded affirmatively, with her campaign citing a September 2025 report by the United Nations Independent International Commission of Inquiry as a factor in her conclusion. The Israeli government rejected the commission's conclusion. McMorrow later criticized the focus on the legal label as a political "purity test" while continuing to say that the United States should remain an ally of Israel.

=== Outreach to voters ===
In 2025, McMorrow proposed a voter outreach strategy of "being unafraid of going everywhere and meeting people where they are", citing unwillingness to engage with figures such as Joe Rogan as contributing to a perception that Democrats are "elitist" and "academic". In a March 2026 interview, however, McMorrow criticized Abdul El-Sayed, her opponent in the 2026 Senate Democratic primary, for campaigning with influencer Hasan Piker, accusing Piker of antisemitism and misogyny. The dispute became one of the sharper intraparty contrasts of the primary campaign.

=== Political funding ===
In a 2017 interview with Bustle, McMorrow said of accepting corporate political action committee (PAC) money, "We'll never even win elections to get more seats at the table if we don't take advantage of every opportunity out there. Right now, money wins elections." In a since-deleted 2017 tweet, she said, "If we on the left continue to tear down candidates for taking money to win, we'll continue to lose."

McMorrow rejected corporate PAC money for her 2026 Senate campaign. She said, "I've learned through my time in the legislature that, you can't talk out of both sides of your mouth, that people won't trust you. And also, not only can we fund campaigns without corporate PAC dollars, but frankly, we need to." As outside groups entered the race for all three major Democratic candidates, Yes MI Action Committee reserved millions of dollars in advertising supporting McMorrow; public-media reporting identified the group as a third-party advertiser supporting her, and later advertising data placed its spending at about $7 million.

=== Technology ===
McMorrow supports policies that would impose legal liability on platforms hosting chatbots for recommending or facilitating harmful material involving suicide, eating disorders, or substance abuse. She has also advocated for a nationwide ban on cellphone use in classrooms, default privacy settings for minors on social-media platforms, restrictions on certain addictive platform features for younger users, and expansion of the Children's Online Privacy Protection Act.

== Personal life ==
In 2017, McMorrow married Ray Wert, the former head of Gawker's content sales department and editor of the weblog Jalopnik. Their daughter was born in 2021, and the family lives in Royal Oak, Michigan.

In her 2025 book, McMorrow wrote that she "relocated permanently" from California to Michigan in 2014. In April 2026, CNN reported on deleted social-media posts from July 2016 in which McMorrow described herself as a California resident. McMorrow had voted in California via absentee ballot in June 2016 and did not register to vote in Michigan until August 2016.

== Electoral history ==
2018 Michigan Senate, 13th district, Democratic Party primary election
Party	Candidate	Votes	%
Democratic	Mallory McMorrow	Unopposed	
Total votes		35,364	100.0

2018 Michigan Senate, 13th district, general election
Party	Candidate	Votes	%
Democratic	Mallory McMorrow	73,146	51.9
Republican	Marty Knollenberg	67,798	48.1
Total votes		140,944	100.0
Democratic gain from Republican			

2022 Michigan Senate, 8th district, Democratic Party primary election
Party	Candidate	Votes	%
Democratic	Mallory McMorrow (incumbent)	32,738	68.45
Democratic	Marshall Bullock (incumbent)	15,093	31.55
Total votes		47,831	100.00

2022 Michigan Senate, 8th district, general election
Party	Candidate	Votes	%
Democratic	Mallory McMorrow (incumbent)	94,878	78.94
Republican	Brandon Ronald Simpson	25,309	21.06
Total votes		120,187	100.00
Democratic hold			

2026 United States Senate election in Michigan Democratic primary
Party	Candidate	Votes	%
Democratic	Abdul El-Sayed	744,952	48.45
Democratic	Haley Stevens	731,160	47.55
Democratic	Mallory McMorrow (withdrawn)	61,516	4.0
Total votes		1,537,628	100.0
