= Haley Stevens =

American politician (born 1983)

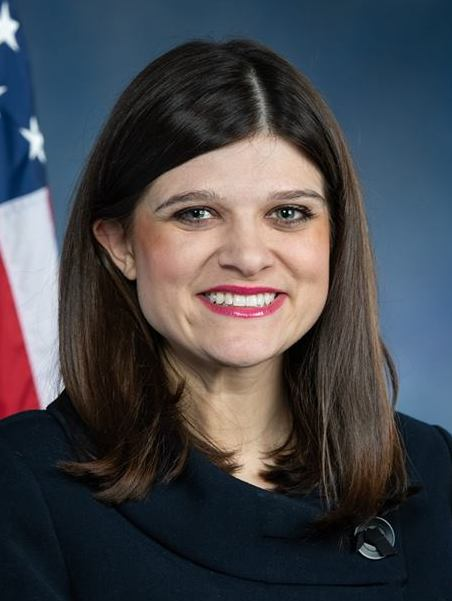
- Official portrait, 2018

Member of the U.S. House of Representatives from Michigan's 11th district
- Incumbent
- Assumed office January 3, 2019
- Preceded by: Dave Trott

Personal details
- Born: Haley Maria Stevens; June 24, 1983 (age 43) Rochester Hills, Michigan, U.S.
- Party: Democratic (Note: Stevens was expelled from the Michigan Democratic Party on November 1, 2026, but remained a member of the House Democratic Caucus and said she was still a Democrat.)
- Education: American University (BA, MA)
- Website: House website Campaign website
- Stevens's voice Stevens on the humanitarian impact of the October 7 attacks and the Gaza war Recorded September 1, 2026

Haley Maria Stevens (born June 24, 1983) is an American politician serving as the U.S. representative from Michigan's 11th congressional district since 2019. A centrist member of the Democratic Party, Stevens supports campaign finance reform, Israel, manufacturing investment, and strategic tariffs, and opposes the Iran war and abolishing Immigration and Customs Enforcement.

Stevens was a candidate for Michigan's Democratic nomination in the 2026 U.S. Senate election, narrowly losing to Abdul El-Sayed. She endorsed El-Sayed and said that his Republican opponent, Mike Rogers, would "rubber-stamp Donald Trump's chaotic agenda". However, two days before the general election, she withdrew her support from El-Sayed and endorsed Rogers instead, resulting in widespread condemnation from Democratic Party leaders, her expulsion from the Michigan Democratic Party, and the resignation of most of her staff. As of November 2026, she remained a member of the House Democratic Caucus.

== Early life ==
Stevens was born in Rochester Hills, Michigan, where she lived until she was in middle school, when her parents divorced and she moved with her mother to Birmingham, Michigan. She went to Cranbrook Schools in Bloomfield Hills for a year, then attended Seaholm High School in Birmingham, where she graduated in 2001. Afterwards, she enrolled at American University in Washington, D.C., where she earned a Bachelor of Arts in political science and philosophy in 2005 and a Master of Arts in social policy and philosophy in 2007.

== Early career ==
In 2006, she was hired by the Michigan Democratic Party as a field organizer. She then began working for Hillary Clinton's 2008 presidential campaign. She transitioned to Barack Obama's presidential campaign after Obama won the Democratic primaries.

In 2009, Steven Rattner hired Stevens to join the Presidential Task Force on the Auto Industry. Stevens then served as director of a manufacturing innovation and economic growth program in Louisville, Kentucky. Afterward, she served as a director of the Digital Manufacturing and Design Innovation Institute in Chicago, where she helped launch America's first online training program in manufacturing and design technology. Stevens returned to Michigan in early 2017.

== U.S. House of Representatives ==
=== Elections ===
==== 2018 ====
Stevens moved back to Rochester Hills to run for the United States House of Representatives seat in Michigan's 11th congressional district, launching her bid to unseat two-term Republican Dave Trott on April 27, 2017. While his spokesperson initially called Stevens a "carpetbagger", Stevens argued that she was born and raised in Southeast Michigan, and had spent her early career working for Michigan. Trott announced his retirement in September 2017, making the 11th district an open seat. Stevens defeated state Representative Tim Greimel in the Democratic Party primary election and Republican businesswoman Lena Epstein in the general election. In August 2018, Stevens was named as part of the DCCC's Red to Blue program, which focused on flipping U.S. House districts by ousting Republicans, joining fellow Michiganders Elissa Slotkin and Gretchen Driskell. Hillary Clinton recorded a late robocall in support of her. Following the robocall, she moved from second place in pre-election polls to winning the election. Politico credited her robocalls for boosting Stevens's campaign. Stevens was also endorsed by President Obama, who called her a "critical part" of his administration's efforts to bail out the auto industry. Stevens's victory, and that of Elissa Slotkin in the neighboring 8th district, made it the first time since the 1930s that no Republicans represented Oakland County in the House.

Stevens and Colin Allred, both alumni of the Obama administration, were selected as co-presidents of the House Democratic freshman class of the 116th United States Congress.

An October 2019 town hall on curbing gun violence turned contentious as protesters at the Commerce Township gun club, where the event was held, interrupted Stevens and other lawmakers. Stevens said "This is why the NRA has got to go" in response to protesters repeatedly shouting "NRA" in reference to the National Rifle Association.

==== 2020 ====
Stevens ran for reelection. She was unopposed in the Democratic primary. In the general election, she defeated the Republican nominee, Eric Esshaki, in a tighter race that saw early ad spending from Republican-allied Congressional Leadership Fund.

In a 2020 floor speech, she shouted over the gavel of her own party saying that she was wearing pink latex gloves "not for personal attention" but to make a point about COVID.

==== 2022 ====
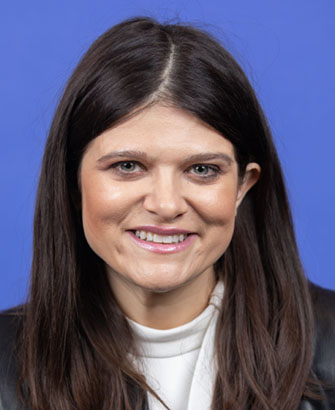
Stevens in 2022

As a result of population loss, Michigan lost a seat in the House of Representatives. The 11th District lost its share of Wayne County and was safely Democratic. The home of fellow Democrat Andy Levin was drawn into the district, and Levin sought reelection there, despite the majority of his old district being in the newly-designated 10th Congressional District. Stevens, whose home in Rochester Hills was drawn out of the district, moved with her husband to a home in Waterford, opting to follow most of her constituents into the 11th and setting up a primary challenge against Levin. She reportedly outspent Levin by a factor of five. Much of her support was driven by the pro-Israel lobby, which had spent $3 million on her campaign by July. Other dynamics in the race included generational and gender dynamics in the aftermath of the Supreme Court's overturning the Roe v. Wade and Planned Parenthood v. Casey. Stevens defeated Levin, 60%–40%. Her campaign focused on protecting reproductive rights and her background as a proponent of Michigan manufacturing, the state's dominant industry. Her victory was aided by $5 million from EMILY's List-affiliated donors and by the American Israel Public Affairs Committee (AIPAC), which invested $4.3 million targeting Levin and hailed her victory as proof that "being pro-Israel is both good policy and good politics". AIPAC's ads did not mention its motivation for supporting Stevens.

Stevens won the general election against Republican Mark Ambrose with 61.3% of the vote.

==== 2024 ====
Stevens was challenged by Ahmed Ghanim in the Democratic primary. She won renomination with 87.1% of the vote. In the general election, she won reelection against Republican Nick Somberg and Green Party candidate Douglas Campbell with 58.2% of the vote.

Stevens voted in March 2023 with Democrats to oppose legislation proposed by Republicans to ban transgender athletes from competing in women's sports.

Following Joe Biden's debate with Donald Trump in the 2024 presidential election, Stevens "unequivocally" supported Biden, saying, "I trust our president and know he is the one to finish the job". As Kamala Harris consolidated support as the new nominee after Biden dropped out, Stevens immediately endorsed her.

=== Committee assignments ===
- Committee on Education and Labor
  - Subcommittee on Health, Employment, Labor, and Pensions
  - United States House Education Subcommittee on Workforce Protections
- Committee on Science, Space, and Technology
  - Subcommittee on Energy
  - Subcommittee on Research and Technology (Ranking Member)
- Select Committee on Strategic Competition between the United States and the Chinese Communist Party

=== Caucus memberships ===
- Black Maternal Health Caucus
- Congressional Asian Pacific American Caucus
- Congressional Equality Caucus
- Congressional Ukraine Caucus
- New Democrat Coalition
- Problem Solvers Caucus
- Rare Disease Caucus

== 2026 U.S. Senate election ==
In April 2025, Stevens announced that she would run in the 2026 United States Senate election in Michigan for the seat being vacated by retiring incumbent Gary Peters. Multiple media outlets reported that her candidacy was backed by the Democratic Senate leadership, including Chuck Schumer and Kirsten Gillibrand, and the Democratic Senatorial Campaign Committee (DSCC). She was endorsed by Representative Jim Clyburn.

The pro-Israel lobbying group AIPAC and its affiliated groups spent approximately $30 million backing Stevens in the Democratic primary. None of the AIPAC-sponsored ads promoting Stevens mentioned Israel; they highlighted her work on manufacturing and featured former president Barack Obama.

She lost the nomination to Abdul El-Sayed in the primary held on August 4, 2026. The following day, she offered El-Sayed her "full support", and a week later, she said Republican nominee Mike Rogers would continue to "rubber-stamp Donald Trump's chaotic agenda".

=== Endorsement of Mike Rogers ===
External videos
- "Rep. Haley Stevens (D-MI) Endorses Mike Rogers (R) in Michigan U.S. Senate Race", November 1, 2026, C-SPAN
- "U.S. Senate Candidate Abdul El-Sayed (D-MI) Speaks to Reporters After Rep. Stevens (D-MI) Endorses GOP Rival Mike Rogers", November 1, 2026, C-SPAN

During the general election, El-Sayed and Stevens did not campaign together; Stevens said she was never invited to do so. Tensions grew between the two, in part over disagreements about Israel and El-Sayed's stance toward an outside PAC's ad that she claimed was antisemitic. On November 1, 2026, hours after telling colleagues she would continue to support El-Sayed, Stevens appeared with Rogers at Perfecting Church in Detroit, praising Rogers's policies on black-owned businesses and sitting next to Rogers in the service. In a follow-up post from her public profile, she withdrew her support from El-Sayed and endorsed Rogers for Senate. Her fiancé, Jason Turkish, had announced his support for Rogers four days earlier; Stevens said he had not influenced her decision. A spokesperson for the Rogers campaign said they had no advance notice of Stevens's endorsement.

Stevens's endorsement was praised by President Donald Trump and House Speaker Mike Johnson but condemned by federal, state, and local Democratic politicians inside and outside Michigan. Senate minority leader Chuck Schumer described it as "a despicable betrayal", and House Minority Leader Hakeem Jeffries said she had "made a terrible decision, blindsided everyone and isolated herself from the House Democratic Caucus." Most of her staff, including her chief of staff and director of communications, resigned.

State party officials said that having not renewed her party membership, she was no longer a member of the state party, and she would not be allowed to rejoin in the future; The Washington Post reported that this amounted to her expulsion from the party. Some House Democrats called for her removal from the House Democratic Caucus, while former Speaker Nancy Pelosi advised against it. Jeffries said the caucus would discuss "appropriate next steps" when Congress returned on November 9.

Rogers lost the race to El-Sayed on November 3, 2026. When Stevens returned to the House on its first day of business after the midterms, she voted from the Republican cloakroom out of view from the public and press. Her office was locked and unstaffed, with all its lights off. The House Clerk listed her "Democratic" on its rolls of both votes.

== Political positions ==
Stevens has been described by many mainstream outlets as a centrist Democrat, with pro-Israel views. She supported Democratic Senate minority leader Chuck Schumer after he backed a Republican-led stopgap funding bill in March 2025 to avoid a government shutdown, calling him "a great leader" who got Michigan billions of dollars in investments through the CHIPS and Science Act.

=== Campaign finance ===
Stevens says she supports campaign finance reform and that her record "speaks for itself". She has sponsored campaign finance legislation including the For The People Act, which passed the House in 2019 but did not become law, and a proposed constitutional amendment that would allow Congress and the states to set and enforce limits on political donations, which would effectively undo the Supreme Court's ruling in Citizens United v. FEC. She has not pledged to reject corporate PAC contributions in her own campaigns, and received $1.7 million from corporate political action committees (PACs) between 2018 and 2025.

During the 2026 Democratic primary for Michigan's United States Senate seat, Stevens benefited from $62 million dollars in outside spending, giving her a roughly 9-to-1 advantage over her opponent, Abdul El-Sayed. $31.9 million of that came from United Democracy Project, the main SuperPAC affiliated with AIPAC – the largest amount spent by a single group in a federal Democratic primary that year, as of August 4, 2026. Another SuperPAC, A Stronger Michigan, spent $17 million in support of Stevens. A Stronger Michigan, which did not register with the FEC until that June, is associated with corporate lobbyist Jeff Murray. According to a July 31, 2026, report from Mother Jones, "Murray has longstanding ties to Center Forward, a nonprofit that backs moderate Democrats and Republicans that is the source of nearly all the donations disclosed by A Stronger Michigan."

Axios reports that the United Democracy Project has invested nearly $19 million in television ads promoting Haley Stevens in the 2026 Democratic Senate primary for Michigan.

=== Economic policy ===
Stevens opposes frequently changing tariffs, saying that they create uncertainty and threaten Michigan jobs. She supports strategically designed tariffs to help America be competitive with China's manufacturing.

Stevens supports federal investment in manufacturing and technology along with workforce development programs, and is a member of the Women in STEM Caucus.

=== Foreign policy ===
==== Iran ====
Stevens supports regime change in Iran but opposes the 2026 Iran war. She has called Iran a "state sponsor of terrorism across the globe", but believes the U.S. Constitution must be followed in first convening and informing Congress.

In July 2026, Stevens denied that President Donald Trump's actions in Iran were due to Israel's influence, saying, "Donald Trump is gonna do what Donald Trump does. And I think it's a fool's run to place blame on him supposedly being dictated by others. What is clear is that Donald Trump and Benjamin Netanyahu, the prime minister of Israel, have failed in the goal of long-term peace. They have both failed."

==== Israel ====
Stevens visited Israel in 2019 and described the visit as transformative. She met with Benjamin Netanyahu, saying "I got to spend a good amount of time with the prime minister". Stevens describes herself as a stalwart supporter of Israel, accusing its critics of antisemitism and characterizing it as a Jewish state, and voted to sanction the International Criminal Court in response to its issuing arrest warrants regarding war crimes in Gaza. Reflecting on her pro-Israel stance, she also said that "we've got to be very clear about who we are and need to stop making everyone happy at the expense of making no one happy".

At a 2023 Hanukkah menorah lighting, she said, "Israel comes to me in my dreams. I see Israel's future, and I know that Israel will continue to exist for the Jewish people."

Stevens has received praise from the pro-Israel lobby group AIPAC for her support of Israel and described it as America's "strong ally", "a democracy, and a beacon of hope" in April 2025. She accepted the support of the pro-Israel lobby group Democratic Majority for Israel in 2026, describing herself as a "proud pro-Israel Democrat".

When asked what her acceptance of campaign contributions from AIPAC donors meant in May 2026, Stevens did not answer the question, instead saying her campaign is "a love letter to our state" and highlighting endorsements from Democratic Party officials without mentioning Israel or AIPAC. AIPAC spent around $30 million promoting Stevens' campaign in the 2026 United States Senate election in Michigan.

In July 2026, Stevens voted against an amendment to end $3.3 billion in annual US funding for Israel for military support. When asked twice about AIPAC, she did not mention the group in a lengthy response, and mentioned Israel once when she said she "wanted to see the U.S. and Israel working together to rebuild Gaza".

In a September 2026 confrontation with activists, she claimed there is no genocide in Gaza and described anti-Zionism as a hate movement.

=== Immigration and ICE enforcement ===
Stevens voted for a resolution that condemned the 2025 Boulder fire attack that killed one and expressed gratitude for United States Immigration and Customs Enforcement (ICE) agents and called for more state and local collaboration with them amid protests against the agency during the June 2025 Los Angeles protests. Stevens opposes abolishing ICE and instead supports "reining" it in.

=== Public health ===
Stevens filed articles of impeachment against Secretary of Health and Human Services Robert F. Kennedy Jr. in December 2025, saying he "has turned his back on science, on public health, and on the American people—spreading conspiracies and lies, driving up costs, and putting lives at risk."

== Personal life ==
Stevens lives in Birmingham, Michigan. She is a Protestant. She married Rob Gulley, a software engineer, in 2021; they announced their divorce in 2022.

On August 26, 2026, Stevens announced her engagement to attorney Jason Turkish. On October 28, 2026, Turkish said that he would support Mike Rogers in the 2026 United States Senate election in Michigan, calling Democratic nominee Abdul El-Sayed antisemitic and later appearing at an event with Rogers. Stevens endorsed Rogers four days later.

In an October 2026 interview with The New York Times, Stevens said she was considering converting to Judaism in preparation for her upcoming marriage to Turkish, who is Jewish.

== Electoral history ==
Michigan's 11th congressional district, 2018
Primary election
Party	Candidate	Votes	%
Democratic	Haley Stevens	24,309	26.97
Democratic	Tim Greimel	19,673	21.83
Democratic	Suneel Gupta	19,250	21.36
Democratic	Fayrouz Saad	17,499	19.41
Democratic	Nancy Skinner	9,407	10.44
Total votes		90,138	100.0
General election
Democratic	Haley Stevens	181,912	51.84
Republican	Lena Epstein	158,463	45.16
Libertarian	Leonard Schwartz	5,799	1.65
Independent	Cooper Nye	4,727	1.35
Total votes		350,901	100.0
Democratic gain from Republican			

Michigan's 11th congressional district, 2020
Party	Candidate	Votes	%
Democratic	Haley Stevens (incumbent)	226,128	50.20
Republican	Eric Esshaki	215,405	47.82
Libertarian	Leonard Schwartz	8,936	1.98
Total votes		450,473	100.0
Democratic hold			

Michigan's 11th congressional district, 2022
Primary election
Party	Candidate	Votes	%
Democratic	Haley Stevens (incumbent)	70,508	59.94
Democratic	Andy Levin (incumbent)	47,117	40.06
Total votes		117,625	100.0
General election
Democratic	Haley Stevens (incumbent)	224,537	61.32
Republican	Mark Ambrose	141,642	38.68
Total votes		366,179	100.0
Democratic hold			

Michigan's 11th congressional district, 2024
Primary election
Party	Candidate	Votes	%
Democratic	Haley Stevens (incumbent)	83,571	87.09
Democratic	Ahmed Ghanim	12,391	12.91
Total votes		95,962	100.0
General election
Democratic	Haley Stevens (incumbent)	260,780	58.22
Republican	Nick Somberg	177,432	39.61
Green	Douglas Campbell	9,713	2.17
Total votes		447,925	100.0
Democratic hold			

2026 United States Senate election in Michigan Democratic primary
Party	Candidate	Votes	%
Democratic	Abdul El-Sayed	744,952	48.45
Democratic	Haley Stevens	731,160	47.55
Democratic	Mallory McMorrow (withdrawn)	61,516	4.0
Total votes		1,537,628	100.0

== Notes ==
U.S. House of Representatives
Preceded by Dave Trott	Member of the U.S. House of Representatives from Michigan's 11th congressional district 2019–present	Incumbent
U.S. order of precedence (ceremonial)
Preceded by Greg Steube	United States representatives by seniority 229th	Succeeded by William Timmons
