= Advance Peace =

U.S. non-profit organization

Advance Peace is a charitable organization based in Richmond, California, which administers a program with the goal of reducing gun violence in American urban neighborhoods. The program involves giving cash stipends to individuals identified as likely to commit violent crimes, but who police have not been able to arrest. The stipends are given to participants as a reward for their desisting from crime. The organization invests in the development, health, and wellbeing of those at the center of this crisis. The size of the stipend varies for each participant depending on how successful they are in the program.

== History ==
Advance Peace was founded in 2010 by DeVone Boggan, who had previously been the director of Richmond's Office of Neighborhood Safety. In December 2017, the city of Sacramento, California signed on to implement the program. The initial version of the program is planned to focus on about 50 participants across the city. In 2018 the organization expanded to Sacramento, where it received a four-year $1.5 million contract with the City of Sacramento. Here the organization reaches out to gang members in order to mentor them in neighbourhoods seen as hot zones for gun violence. They also have offices in Stockton and Oakland. In 2020 Advance Peace began the process of adding an office in the City of Fresno.
