= United Democracy Project =

American super PAC affiliated with AIPAC

- Abbreviation: UDP
- Formation: January 3, 2022; 4 years ago
- Type: Super PAC
- Registration no.: C00799031
- Region served: United States
- Treasurer: Christopher D'Alessio
- Parent organization: AIPAC
- Revenue: 87,176,557 USD (January 2023-December 2024)
- Website: uniteddemocracyproject.org

The United Democracy Project (UDP) is a U.S. political action committee that functions as a super PAC. It was formed by the American Israel Public Affairs Committee (AIPAC) in January 2022 and spends its own funds to back or oppose candidates in federal elections.

== History ==
AIPAC announced in December 2021 that it would launch both a political action committee and a super PAC ahead of the 2022 election cycle. The United Democracy Project was officially registered with the Federal Election Commission on January 3, 2022, as a super PAC dedicated to independent expenditures in federal races.

== Electoral activity ==
The United Democracy Project has put money into independent expenditures in federal races, especially Democratic House primaries. In the 2022 cycle, it brought in more than $35.9 million and spent over $32.9 million—$26.1 million of that on independent expenditures for or against Democratic House candidates.

During the 2024 election cycle, the United Democracy Project raised roughly $87.1 million and spent about $61.4 million. Of that spending, $34.8 million went to independent expenditures—money used to support or oppose Democratic candidates for the House of Representatives.

By the end of June 2026, the group had brought in roughly $104 million for the current cycle. As of June 30, it had spent about $52.5 million—more than $27.9 million of which went to independent expenditures, according to Federal Election Commission records.

The American Prospect reports that the United Democracy Project sent $5.3 million in 2026 to two political action committees—Elect Chicago Women and Affordable Chicago Now—to spend on four Illinois primary races.

Axios reports that the United Democracy Project has set aside roughly $19 million for TV ads supporting Haley Stevens in the 2026 Democratic Senate primary in Michigan. A campaign finance filing in October 2026 showed that UDP had spent nearly $100,000 on mail advertising opposing Abdul El-Sayed, the Democratic nominee in Michigan's Senate race.

In the 2026 House primaries, UDP put about $5 million behind Melissa Conyears-Ervin in Illinois's 7th Congressional District and more than $1 million behind Adrian Boafo in Maryland's 5th. Conyears-Ervin lost the Democratic primary on March 17; Boafo won his on June 23. In Kentucky's 4th Congressional District, UDP spent more than $3 million trying to unseat incumbent Thomas Massie and nearly $500,000 backing his challenger, Ed Gallrein. Massie lost the Republican primary on May 19.

As of October 24, 2026, the United Democracy Project had raised $112.8 million and reported $54 million in independent spending. These figures exceeded the $104 million raised and $52.5 million spent, including $27.9 million in independent spending, recorded through the end of June 2026. The group's largest intervention in the 2026 cycle came in Michigan's Democratic Senate primary, where the UDP spent $20.7 million to oppose Abdul El-Sayed and $10.6 million to support Rep. Haley Stevens. These amounts represent the group's total independent expenses and provide a more complete report than previous reports.
