= Jalopnik =

Online automotive magazine

- Editor-in-chief: Rory Carroll
- Categories: Automotive
- Frequency: Daily
- Founder: Mike Spinelli
- Founded: October 2004
- Company: Static Media
- Country: United States
- Based in: New York City
- Language: English
- Website: jalopnik.com

Jalopnik is an American online magazine focused on automobiles, car culture, and the automotive industry. It is owned by Static Media.

== History ==
Jalopnik was founded in October 2004 by Gawker Media as part of Nick Denton's network of weblogs, with journalist Mike Spinelli serving as the founding editor. It was established to provide an alternative voice to traditional automotive journalism and gained a following for its irreverent take on car news and culture.

In 2016, following the bankruptcy of Gawker Media, Jalopnik was acquired by Univision Communications for $135 million along with other former Gawker sites and later reorganized into the Gizmodo Media Group. Under Univision's ownership, Jalopnik continued to operate alongside sister sites such as Gizmodo, Deadspin, and Jezebel.

In April 2019, Univision sold the Gizmodo Media Group to the private equity firm Great Hill Partners, which subsequently formed G/O Media. Jalopnik operated under G/O Media until late 2024, when it was sold to Indianapolis-based digital publishing company Static Media. The acquisition was finalized in early 2025.

== Coverage ==
Jalopnik provides daily coverage of a wide range of automotive topics, including industry news, car launches, motorsports, technological developments, and enthusiast car culture. It publishes a mix of straightforward news reporting, vehicle reviews, buying guides, and opinion pieces. Its content often extends beyond cars themselves to related areas such as motorcycles, racing, aviation, and transportation technology. A hallmark of Jalopnik's editorial approach is its casual, witty tone. Regular features include vehicle reviews and the crowd-sourced valuation series "Nice Price or No Dice."

Current full-time staff includes editors Erin Marquis and Daniel Golson, as well as staff writers Logan Carter, Amber DaSilva, Andy Kalmowitz, Ryan Erik King and Collin Woodard. They work alongside long-time regular contributors such as Brad Brownell, Rob Emslie and Tom McParland.

== Jalopnik Film Festival ==
In 2013, Jalopnik launched the Jalopnik Film Festival, a film festival focused on automotive cinema and culture. The inaugural festival featured exotic vehicle exhibitions and panel discussions with cinematographers, directors, and automotive enthusiasts. Ron Howard's Formula 1 film Rush, was screened at the film festival, one week before its general theatrical release. Later editions were held in New York City, Los Angeles, and Williamsburg.

== Editors ==
- Mike Spinelli
- Matt Hardigree
- Ray Wert
- Patrick George
- Erin Marquis
- Rory Carroll
