= Center Forward =

Nonprofit political advocacy group

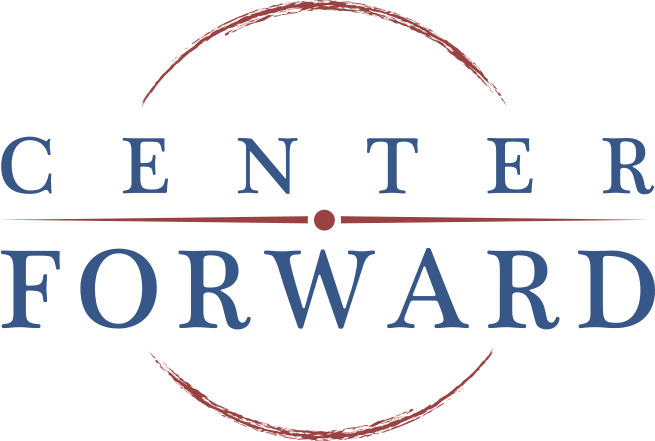
- Formation: 2010; 16 years ago
- Type: Nonprofit political advocacy group
- Legal status: 501(c)(4)
- Headquarters: Washington, DC, U.S
- CEO: Cori Kramer
- Revenue: $13 million (2024)
- Expenses: $12.3 million (2024)
- Website: center-forward.org

Center Forward is a national, centrist social and political advocacy nonprofit and 501(c)(4) organization based in Washington, D.C. It promotes centrist and bipartisan policymaking in the United States and engages in public education, policy research, and issue-based advertising, with the stated goal of serving as "a premier convener for cross-party dialogue" The group is chaired by former U.S. representative and Democratic Party politician Bud Cramer of Alabama.

== History ==
The think tank Center Forward was launched by a group of moderate policymakers to serve as a convener for centrist policies and solutions. The group's original name was the Blue Dog Research Forum, having grown out of the Blue Dog Coalition as its number dwindled, and rebranded to "Center Forward" to reflect the bipartisan nature of its goals.

Rep. Cramer said, "Since our founding in 2010, we have brought together Republicans and Democrats and have seen firsthand how breaking down those barriers can lead to positive change in how government operates. We will continue to work to be a positive force in Washington as policymakers address the issues that face Americans across the country."

In 2020, CEO Cori Kramer told Business Insider, "A functioning and successful government for the American people is what we should all be focusing on, from Cabinet appointments to legislative agendas. This is unlike anything we've seen in recent history and should be seen as an opportunity for both parties to come to the table to address the ongoing health and economic crises."

== Policies and activities ==
Center Forward's work covers eight main policy areas: energy and sustainability, financial services, healthcare, innovation and technology, pragmatic governance, tax reform, trade, and workforce development. It has advocated on issues like preserving incentives like the orphan drug tax credit to promote medical innovation during broader tax reform debate.

Center Forward conducts research, polling, and policy discussions focused on federal economic and social policies.

Its projects have included:

- Work with the Bipartisan Policy Center on projects to support small businesses.
- Public-opinion research (2025) reporting that some Trump voters viewed the administration as distracted from economic issues.
- A joint report with PwC (2024) comparing U.S. and international tax-filing systems, concluding that countries with return-free filing typically maintain simpler tax codes.
- An International Chiefs of Staff Issues Conference in Mexico City (Feb. 2026) to discuss ongoing economic impact of the United States-Mexico-Canada Agreement (USMCA).
- A report (March 2026) that found overwhelming bipartisan support for women's health issues: 90% of respondents agreed that women have unique health needs that require specific attention.
- A study on widespread dissatisfaction with partisanship across the political spectrum (July 2026), reporting that voters are frustrated that hyper-partisanship distracts from every day affordability issues. Study participants expressed concern about government overreach, taxation, executive authority and protection of individual rights.
- A bipartisan Gerrymandering Reform Framework (July 2026), in coordination with the Problem Solvers Caucus in response to widespread gerrymandering efforts leading up to the 2026 midterms. Center Forward CEO Cori Kramer said, “Most people want their elected officials to work together, solve problems and address the issues that affect their everyday lives. Gerrymandering makes that harder. It creates districts where elected officials have less incentive to work across the aisle, find common ground or build the kinds of durable bipartisan solutions that can actually move the country forward.”

Center Forward also presents an "Advancing Good Governance Award" program, which recognizes Members of Congress who are committed to bipartisan leadership and constructive dialogue. This award is presented annually to members of Congress known for building coalitions. The list of 2025 recipients included: Sen. James Lankford (R-OK), Sen. Amy Klobuchar (D-MN), Rep. Ami Bera (D-CA), Rep. Jim Costa (D-CA), and Rep. Ryan Mackenzie (R-PA).

In April 2019, The Intercept reported that Center Forward hosted a bipartisan policy retreat for senior congressional staff at a resort in Virginia, featuring panels on healthcare legislation from health insurance industry lobbyists who are leading opposition to Medicare for All. Center Forward has endorsed various politicians, including John Barrow in Georgia's 2014 elections. Center Forward reportedly spent $1 million on national television ads promoting a bipartisan approach to balancing the budget. It is chaired by former Democratic Representative Bud Cramer.

== Funding and political spending ==
For 2023, Center Forward reported roughly $13 million in revenue and $12.3 million in expenditures, allocated to policy research, events, and advocacy campaigns. Center Forward supports "centrist allies" on both sides of the aisle through a variety of means, including super PACs.

According to the organization’s 2022 IRS Form 990 filings, Center Forward reported $12.97 million in total expenses, nearly all dedicated to research, events, and nationwide advertising campaigns. Investigations by Kaiser Health News and OpenSecrets identified Center Forward among advocacy groups that received substantial support from pharmaceutical-industry lobbying entities. The group does not disclose individual donors, consistent with U.S. law governing 501(c)(4) "social-welfare" organizations. The group has been heavily funded with dark money donations from the pharmaceutical industry's lobbying group.

In November 2025, Center Forward Committee, its super PAC, is spent $630,000 into online and mail ads aimed at helping Representative Angie Craig against Lieutenant Governor Peggy Flanagan in the 2026 United States Senate election in Minnesota.

As of August 2026, the Center Forward Initiative (CFI) superPAC spent $4.7 million on mail and digital ads in the 2026 general election for both Republican candidates, including Susan Collins, Juan Ciscomani, Kevin Kiley, David Valadao, Gabe Evans, Mariannette Miller-Meeks, Greg Murphy, Andrew Garbarino, Mike Lawler, Brian Fitzpatrick, Rob Bresnahan, Rob Wittman, Jen Kiggans, Bryan Steil, Blake Moore and Jeff Hurd.
