= Mari Manoogian =

American politician (b. 1992)

Member of the Michigan House of Representatives from the 40th district
- In office January 1, 2019 – December 31, 2022
- Preceded by: Mike McCready
- Succeeded by: Christine Morse

Personal details
- Born: September 3, 1992 (age 33) Birmingham, Michigan, U.S.
- Party: Democratic
- Education: George Washington University (BA, MA)
- Website: Campaign website State House website

Mari Manoogian (born September 3, 1992) is an American politician from Michigan who represented the 40th District in the Michigan House of Representatives. A member of the Democratic Party, her constituency included several communities within Oakland County, including Birmingham, Bloomfield Hills, Bloomfield Township, and part of West Bloomfield Township.

== Early life and education ==
Manoogian was born in Birmingham, Michigan, as the eldest daughter of a utility worker and union leader, and a vocational rehabilitation specialist. After graduating from Ernest W. Seaholm High School in 2010, Manoogian began her undergraduate work at Michigan State University's James Madison College. She moved to Washington, D.C. in 2012, and finished her bachelor's degree in international relations and security policy at George Washington University's Elliott School of International Affairs in 2014, and earned a master's degree in global communication and international organizations from the same institution in 2017.

Manoogian's family are descendants of survivors of the Armenian genocide. She is a member of St. Sarkis Armenian Apostolic Church in Dearborn.

== Career ==
During her undergraduate studies, Manoogian interned in the office of U.S. Representative John Dingell and at the United States Mission to the United Nations under Ambassador Samantha Power. She began work in Washington, D.C., at the United States Department of State, first in the Office of English Language Programs and later in the Office of eDiplomacy, before returning to Michigan and running for office.

Manoogian began campaigning for election to the Michigan House of Representatives in August 2017. Receiving the endorsement of national progressive candidate recruitment organization Run for Something, Manoogian won the Democratic primary in August 2018, defeating the 2016 Democratic nominee for the 40th District, Nicole Bedi. During the general election, Manoogian was endorsed by former U.S. President Barack Obama and Hillary Clinton. Manoogian defeated David Wolkinson – former vice chairman of the Michigan Republican Party and policy director for Governor Rick Snyder – by 56.5% to 43.4%, flipping the district for the first time in 22 years.

Manoogian was selected as one of seventeen speakers to jointly deliver the keynote address at the 2020 Democratic National Convention nominating Joe Biden and Kamala Harris.

=== Political positions ===
Manoogian supports repealing the state Senior Pension Tax and expanding investment in renewable energy practices. She has been profiled by national and local news outlets in the lead-up to her election for supporting funding for clean water initiatives in her district. She considers herself a progressive.

== Campaigns ==
=== 2020 ===
2020 Michigan House of Representatives, 40th district, general election
Party	Candidate	Votes	%	±%
Democratic	Mari Manoogian	38,162	57.77	+1.2
Republican	Kendra Cleary	27,897	42.23	−1.2
Turnout		66,059	100.00	+23.6

=== 2018 ===
2018 Michigan House of Representatives, 40th district, general election
Party	Candidate	Votes	%
Democratic	Mari Manoogian	30,223	56.5
Republican	David Wolkinson	23,221	43.4
Turnout		53,444	100.0

2018 Michigan House of Representatives, 40th district, Democratic Party primary election
Party	Candidate	Votes	%
Democratic	Mari Manoogian	8,877	53.1
Democratic	Nicole Bedi	7,856	46.9

Party political offices
Preceded by Elizabeth Warren	Keynote Speaker of the Democratic National Convention; 2020; Served alongside: Stacey Abrams, Raumesh Akbari, Colin Allred, Brendan Boyle, Yvanna Cancela, Kathleen Clyde, Nikki Fried, Robert Garcia, Malcolm Kenyatta, Marlon Kimpson, Conor Lamb, Victoria Neave, Jonathan Nez, Sam Park, Denny Ruprecht, Randall Woodfin	Succeeded by Angela Alsobrooks
