= 2018 United States House of Representatives elections in Michigan =

- November 6, 2018

All 14 Michigan seats to the United States House of Representatives
- Turnout: 57.8%
	Majority party	Minority party
Party	Democratic	Republican
Last election	5	9
Seats before	4	9
Seats won	7	7
Seat change	▲2	▼2
Popular vote	2,165,586	1,847,480
Percentage	52.33%	44.65%
Swing	▲5.36%	▼3.38%

Democratic
40–50%
50–60%
60–70%
70–80%
80–90%
Republican
50–60%
60–70%
70–80%

The 2018 United States House of Representatives elections in Michigan were held on November 6, 2018, to elect the 14 U.S. representatives from the state of Michigan, one from each of the state's 14 congressional districts. The elections coincided with the elections of other offices, including a gubernatorial election, other elections to the House of Representatives, elections to the United States Senate, and various state and local elections. The filing deadline for candidates filing for the August 7 primary was April 24, 2018. Unless otherwise indicated, the Cook Political Report rated the congressional races as safe for the party of the incumbent.

Two seats shifted from Republican to Democratic control. In the 8th Congressional District, Elissa Slotkin defeated incumbent Mike Bishop and in an open seat for the 11th Congressional District, Haley Stevens defeated Lena Epstein. This left Michigan's U.S. House delegation in the 116th United States Congress with seven Democrats and seven Republicans until July 4, 2019, when Justin Amash of the 3rd Congressional District left the Republican Party to become an independent, shifting the balance of power in Michigan's House delegation to a Democratic plurality for the first time since 2011.

== Results summary ==
=== Statewide ===
Party	Candi- dates	Votes		Seats		
Party	Candi- dates	No.	%	No.	+/–	%
Democratic Party	14	2,165,586	52.33%	7	▲2	50.00%
Republican Party	13	1,847,480	44.65%	7	▼2	50.00%
Working Class Party	5	52,879	1.28%	0	Steady	0.00%
U.S. Taxpayers' Party	4	27,007	0.65%	0	Steady	0.00%
Independent	3	18,299	0.44%	0	Steady	0.00%
Green Party	3	14,805	0.36%	0	Steady	0.00%
Libertarian Party	2	12,095	0.29%	0	Steady	0.00%
Total	44	4,138,151	100.00%	14	Steady	100.00%

Popular vote
Democratic	52.33%
Republican	44.65%
Working Class Party	1.28%
Other	1.74%

House seats
Republican	50.00%
Democratic	50.00%

=== District ===
Results of the 2018 United States House of Representatives elections in Michigan by district:

District	Democratic		Republican		Others		Total		Result
District	Votes	%	Votes	%	Votes	%	Votes	%	Result
District 1	145,246	43.68%	187,251	56.32%	0	0.00%	332,497	100.00%	Republican hold
District 2	131,254	42.97%	168,970	55.32%	5,239	1.72%	305,463	100.00%	Republican hold
District 3	134,185	43.18%	169,107	54.42%	7,448	2.40%	310,740	100.00%	Republican hold
District 4	106,540	37.38%	178,510	62.62%	0	0.00%	285,050	100.00%	Republican hold
District 5	164,502	59.51%	99,265	35.91%	12,646	4.58%	276,413	100.00%	Democratic hold
District 6	134,082	45.69%	147,436	50.24%	11,920	4.06%	293,438	100.00%	Republican hold
District 7	136,330	46.20%	158,730	53.80%	0	0.00%	295,060	100.00%	Republican hold
District 8	172,880	50.61%	159,782	46.78%	8,931	2.61%	341,593	100.00%	Democratic gain
District 9	181,734	59.67%	112,123	36.81%	10,706	3.52%	304,563	100.00%	Democratic hold
District 10	106,061	35.00%	182,808	60.32%	14,195	4.68%	303,064	100.00%	Republican hold
District 11	181,912	51.84%	158,463	45.16%	10,526	3.00%	350,901	100.00%	Democratic gain
District 12	200,588	68.08%	85,115	28.89%	8,925	3.03%	294,628	100.00%	Democratic hold
District 13	165,355	84.24%	0	0.00%	30,944	15.76%	196,299	100.00%	Democratic hold
District 14	214,334	80.88%	45,899	17.32%	4,761	1.80%	264,994	100.00%	Democratic hold
Total	2,175,003	52.35%	1,853,459	44.61%	126,241	3.04%	4,154,703	100.00%	

== District 1 ==
2018 Michigan's 1st congressional district election
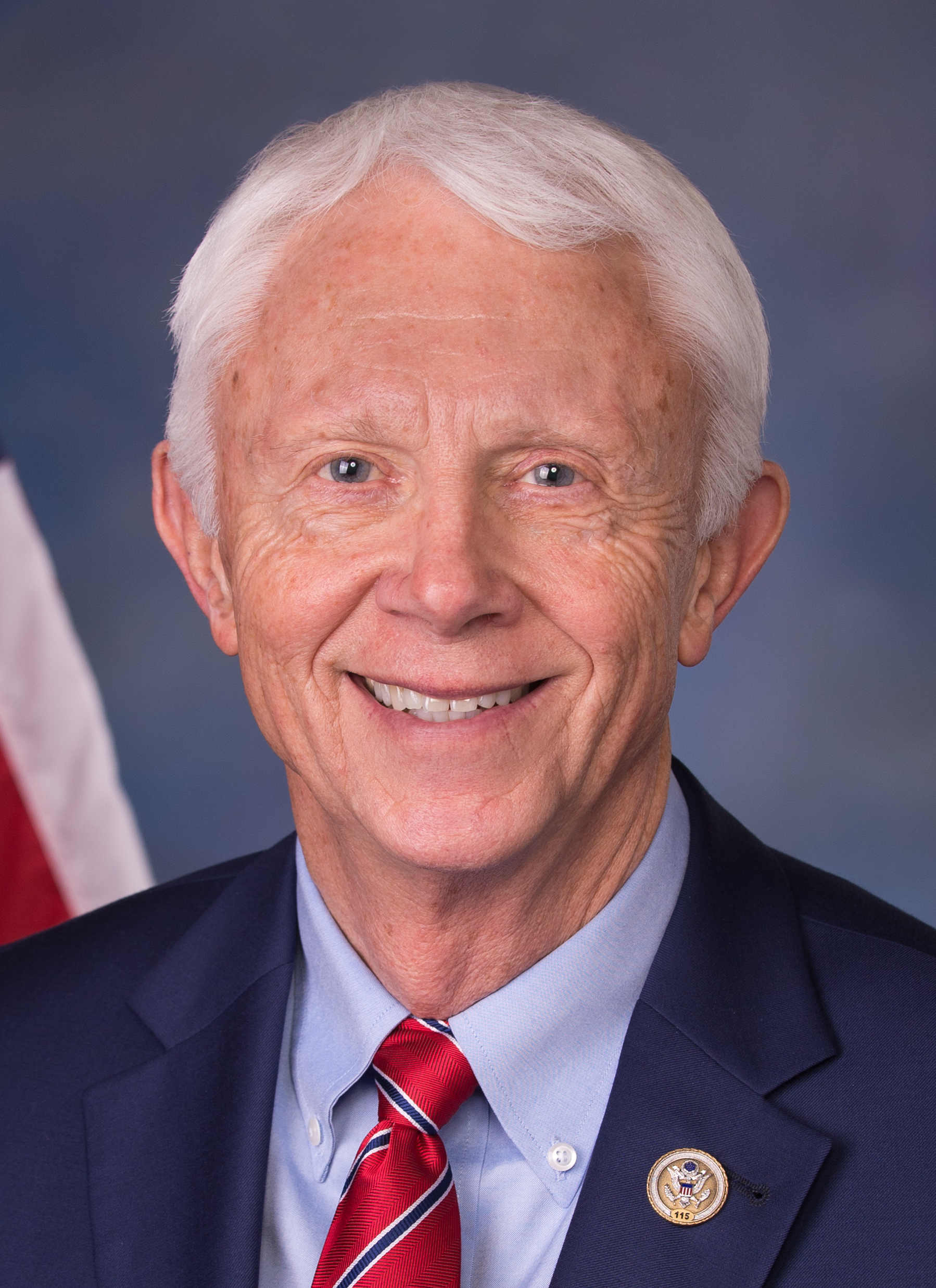

Nominee	Jack Bergman	Matthew Morgan
Party	Republican	Democratic
Popular vote	187,251	145,246
Percentage	56.3%	43.7%
- Bergman: 50–60% 60–70% 70–80% 80–90% Morgan: 50–60% 60–70% 70–80% Tie: 50% No votes
U.S. Representative before election
Jack Bergman
Republican
Elected U.S. Representative
Jack Bergman
Republican

The 1st district consists of the entire Upper Peninsula of Michigan and the northern part of the Lower Peninsula including Alpena, Marquette, and Traverse City. This district had a PVI of R+9. The district, which makes up about 44% of the land area of the state of Michigan, is the second-largest congressional district east of the Mississippi River by land area. The incumbent was Republican Jack Bergman, who had represented the district since 2017. He was elected to replace retiring representative Dan Benishek with 55% of the vote in 2016. The Cook Political Report rated this race "likely Republican".

=== Republican primary ===
==== Candidates ====
===== Nominee =====
- Jack Bergman, incumbent U.S. representative

==== Primary results ====
Republican primary results
Party	Candidate	Votes	%
Republican	Jack Bergman (incumbent)	83,272	100.0
Total votes		83,272	100.0

=== Democratic primary ===
Matt Morgan was the only Democrat to file to run. However, he was removed from the ballot because he used a PO box address on his nomination petitions instead of his residential address. Instead, Morgan ran a write-in campaign, hoping to qualify for the ballot by winning at least five percent of the total votes cast in the district for the Democratic gubernatorial primary. Over 4,800 votes were cast in Marquette County, which would have been enough by itself to qualify Morgan for the ballot. According to official results, Democrats cast 29,293 write-in votes in the primary for Morgan, more than seven times the 3,781-vote threshold. On August 24, the Board of State Canvassers placed him on the November ballot.

==== Candidates ====
===== Nominee =====
- Matthew W. Morgan, retired US Marine Corps lieutenant colonel and Iraq War veteran

===== Withdrawn =====
- Dwight Brady, professor

==== Primary results ====
Democratic primary results
Party	Candidate	Votes	%
Democratic	Matthew W. Morgan (write-in)	29,293	100.0
Total votes		29,293	100.0

=== General election ===
==== Endorsements ====
Matt Morgan (D)

Labor unions

- AFL-CIO

Organizations

- End Citizens United
- Justice Democrats

Individuals

- Michael Moore, documentarian and activist

==== Polling ====
Poll source	Date(s) administered	Sample size	Margin of error	Jack Bergman (R)	Matt Morgan (D)	Undecided
Change Research (D)	October 27–29, 2018	574	–	54%	42%	–

==== Predictions ====
Source	Ranking	As of
The Cook Political Report	Likely R	November 5, 2018
Inside Elections	Safe R	November 5, 2018
Sabato's Crystal Ball	Likely R	November 5, 2018
RCP	Safe R	November 5, 2018
Daily Kos	Likely R	November 5, 2018
538	Likely R	November 7, 2018

==== Results ====
Michigan's 1st congressional district, 2018
Party	Candidate	Votes	%
Republican	Jack Bergman (incumbent)	187,251	56.3
Democratic	Matt Morgan	145,246	43.7
Total votes		332,497	100.0
Republican hold			

== District 2 ==
2018 Michigan's 2nd congressional district election
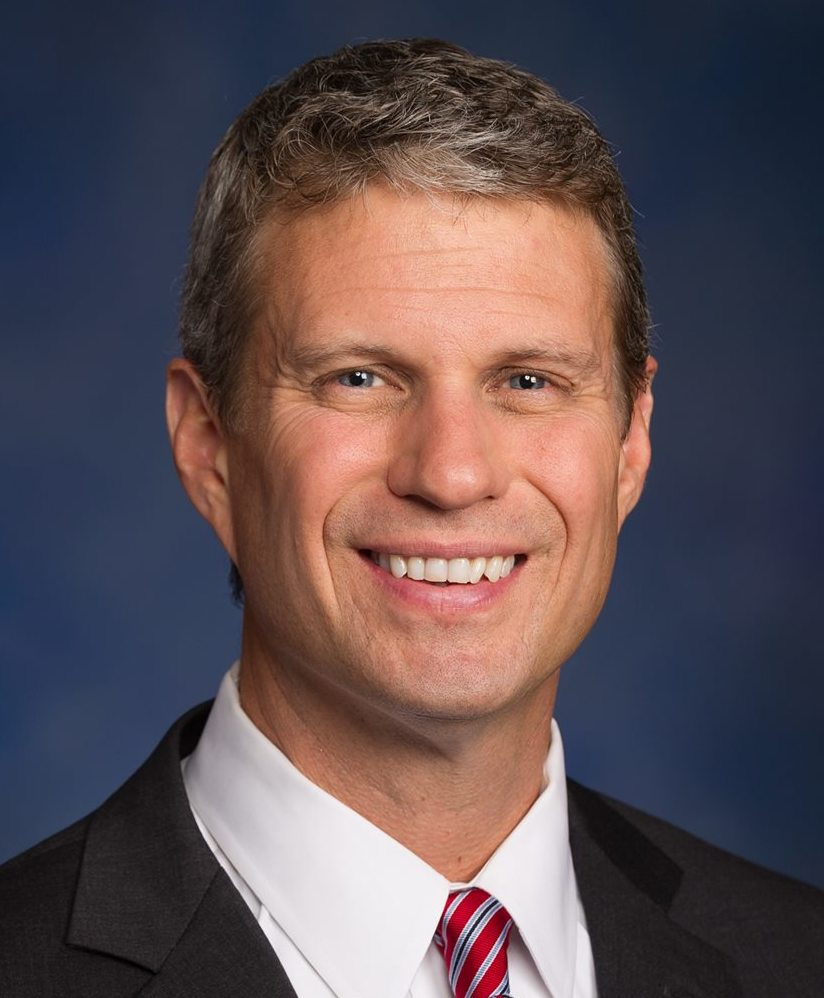

Nominee	Bill Huizenga	Rob Davidson
Party	Republican	Democratic
Popular vote	168,970	131,254
Percentage	55.3%	43.0%
- Huizenga: 40–50% 50–60% 60–70% 70–80% 80–90% Davidson 40–50% 50–60% 60–70% 70–80% 80–90% >90% No votes
U.S. Representative before election
Bill Huizenga
Republican
Elected U.S. Representative
Bill Huizenga
Republican

The 2nd district is located in West Michigan and is anchored by the suburbs of Grand Rapids such as Kentwood and Wyoming, other cities include Holland and Muskegon. This district had a PVI of R+9. The incumbent was Republican Bill Huizenga, who had represented the district since 2011. He was re-elected to a fourth term with 63% of the vote in 2016.

=== Republican primary ===
==== Primary results ====
Republican primary results
Party	Candidate	Votes	%
Republican	Bill Huizenga (incumbent)	79,620	100.0
Total votes		79,620	100.0

=== Democratic primary ===
==== Candidates ====
===== Nominee =====
- Rob Davidson, ER doctor

===== Failed to qualify =====
- Nick Schiller, political newcomer

==== Primary results ====
Democratic primary results
Party	Candidate	Votes	%
Democratic	Rob Davidson	52,221	100.0
Total votes		52,221	100.0

=== General election ===
==== Endorsements ====
Rob Davidson (D)

Labor unions

- AFL-CIO

Organizations

- End Citizens United

==== Polling ====
Poll source	Date(s) administered	Sample size	Margin of error	Bill Huizenga (R)	Rob Davidson (D)	Undecided
Lake Research Partners (D-Davidson)	October 11–15, 2018	400	± 4.9%	48%	42%	7%

==== Predictions ====
Source	Ranking	As of
The Cook Political Report	Safe R	November 5, 2018
Inside Elections	Safe R	November 5, 2018
Sabato's Crystal Ball	Likely R	November 5, 2018
RCP	Safe R	November 5, 2018
Daily Kos	Safe R	November 5, 2018
538	Likely R	November 7, 2018

==== Results ====
Michigan's 2nd congressional district, 2018
Party	Candidate	Votes	%
Republican	Bill Huizenga (incumbent)	168,970	55.3
Democratic	Rob Davidson	131,254	43.0
U.S. Taxpayers'	Ron Graeser	5,239	1.7
Total votes		305,463	100.0
Republican hold			

== District 3 ==
2018 Michigan's 3rd congressional district election
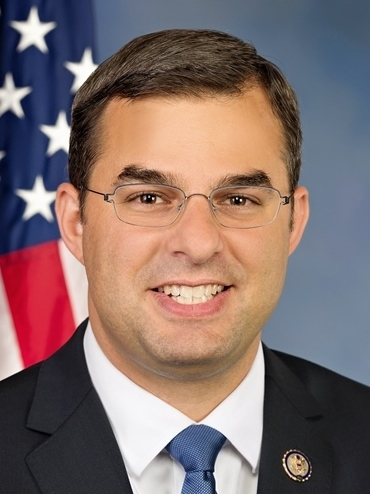

Nominee	Justin Amash	Cathy Albro
Party	Republican	Democratic
Popular vote	169,107	134,185
Percentage	54.4%	43.2%
- Amash: 40–50% 50–60% 60–70% 70–80% 80–90% Albro: 40–50% 50–60% 60–70% 70–80% 80–90% >90% Tie: 40–50% No votes
U.S. Representative before election
Justin Amash
Republican
Elected U.S. Representative
Justin Amash
Republican

The 3rd district is located in inland West Michigan, centered on the city of Grand Rapids, and extends down to Battle Creek and Marshall. This district had a PVI of R+6. The incumbent was Republican Justin Amash, who had represented the district since 2011. He was re-elected to a fourth term with 59% of the vote in 2016.

=== Republican primary ===
==== Candidates ====
===== Nominee =====
- Justin Amash, incumbent U.S. representative

===== Failed to qualify =====
- Joe Farrington
- Matt Hall

==== Primary results ====
Republican primary results
Party	Candidate	Votes	%
Republican	Justin Amash (incumbent)	69,817	99.9
Republican	Joe Farrington (write-in)	52	0.1
Total votes		69,869	100.0

=== Democratic primary ===
==== Candidates ====
===== Nominee =====
- Cathy Albro, educator

===== Eliminated in primary =====
- Fred Wooden, pastor

==== Primary results ====
Democratic primary results
Party	Candidate	Votes	%
Democratic	Cathy Albro	42,619	68.2
Democratic	Fred Wooden	19,903	31.8
Total votes		62,522	100.0

=== General election ===
==== Endorsements ====
Cathy Albro (D)

Labor unions

- AFL-CIO

==== Predictions ====
Source	Ranking	As of
The Cook Political Report	Likely R	November 5, 2018
Inside Elections	Safe R	November 5, 2018
Sabato's Crystal Ball	Likely R	November 5, 2018
RCP	Safe R	November 5, 2018
Daily Kos	Safe R	November 5, 2018
538	Safe R	November 7, 2018

==== Results ====
Michigan's 3rd congressional district, 2018
Party	Candidate	Votes	%
Republican	Justin Amash (incumbent)	169,107	54.4
Democratic	Cathy Albro	134,185	43.2
U.S. Taxpayers'	Ted Gerrard	7,445	2.4
Independent	Joe Farrington (write-in)	3	0.0
Total votes		310,740	100.0
Republican hold			

== District 4 ==
2018 Michigan's 4th congressional district election
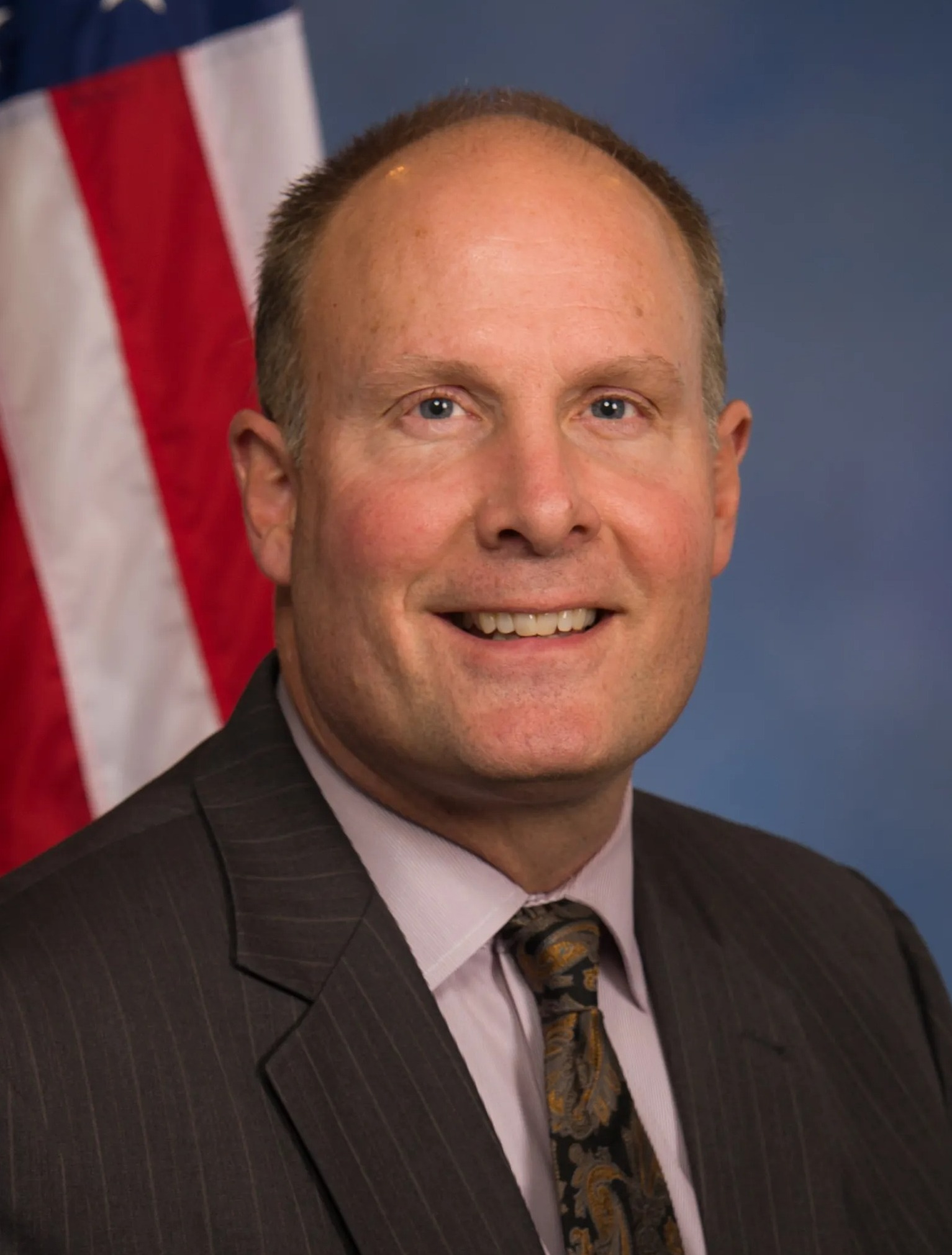

Nominee	John Moolenaar	Jerry Hillard
Party	Republican	Democratic
Popular vote	178,510	106,540
Percentage	62.6%	37.4%
- Moolenaar: 50–60% 60–70% 70–80% 80–90% >90% Hillard: 50–60% 60–70% No votes
U.S. Representative before election
John Moolenaar
Republican
Elected U.S. Representative
John Moolenaar
Republican

The 4th district is located in Northern and Central Michigan including portions of the Tri-Cities region, specifically Midland, other cities include Mount Pleasant and the northern suburbs of Lansing. This district had a PVI of R+10. The incumbent was Republican John Moolenaar, who had represented the district since 2015. He was re-elected to a second term with 62% of the vote in 2016.

=== Republican primary ===
==== Candidates ====
===== Nominee =====
- John Moolenaar, incumbent U.S. representative

==== Primary results ====
Republican primary results
Party	Candidate	Votes	%
Republican	John Moolenaar (incumbent)	80,290	100.0
Total votes		80,290	100.0

=== Democratic primary ===
==== Candidates ====
===== Nominee =====
- Jerry Hilliard

===== Eliminated in primary =====
- Zigmond Kozicki

===== Failed to qualify =====
- Dion Adams

==== Primary results ====
Democratic primary results
Party	Candidate	Votes	%
Democratic	Jerry Hilliard	32,263	66.5
Democratic	Zigmond Kozicki	16,261	33.5
Total votes		48,524	100.0

=== General election ===
==== Predictions ====
Source	Ranking	As of
The Cook Political Report	Safe R	November 5, 2018
Inside Elections	Safe R	November 5, 2018
Sabato's Crystal Ball	Safe R	November 5, 2018
RCP	Safe R	November 5, 2018
Daily Kos	Safe R	November 5, 2018
538	Safe R	November 7, 2018
CNN	Safe R	October 31, 2018
Politico	Safe R	November 4, 2018

==== Endorsements ====
Jerry Hilliard (D)

Labor unions

- AFL-CIO

==== Results ====
Michigan's 4th congressional district, 2018
Party	Candidate	Votes	%
Republican	John Moolenaar (incumbent)	178,510	62.6
Democratic	Jerry Hilliard	106,540	37.4
Total votes		285,050	100.0
Republican hold			

== District 5 ==
2018 Michigan's 5th congressional district election
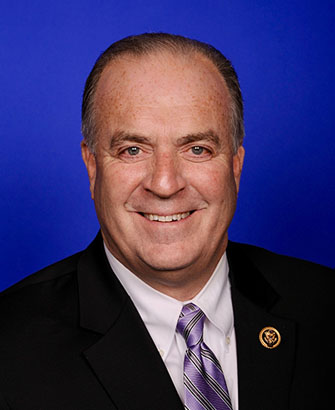

Nominee	Dan Kildee	Travis Wines
Party	Democratic	Republican
Popular vote	164,502	99,265
Percentage	59.5%	35.9%
- Kildee: 40–50% 50–60% 60–70% 70–80% 80–90% >90% Wines: 40–50% 50–60% 60–70% No votes
U.S. Representative before election
Dan Kildee
Democratic
Elected U.S. Representative
Dan Kildee
Democratic

The 5th district is located along the eastern coast of Michigan, centered on the Tri-Cities region of Mid Michigan, such as Bay City and Saginaw, and stretches down into Flint. This district had a PVI of D+5. The incumbent was Democrat Dan Kildee, who had represented the district since 2013. He was re-elected to a third term with 61% of the vote in 2016. Kildee considered running for governor in 2018, but decided to run for re-election instead.

=== Democratic primary ===
==== Candidates ====
===== Nominee =====
- Dan Kildee, incumbent U.S. representative

==== Primary results ====
Democratic primary results
Party	Candidate	Votes	%
Democratic	Dan Kildee (incumbent)	73,996	100.0
Total votes		73,996	100.0

=== Republican primary ===
Michigan's 5th district was included on the initial list of Democratic held seats being targeted by the National Republican Congressional Committee in 2018. There was one Republican candidate, Durand resident Travis Wines, who lived outside the district.

==== Candidates ====
===== Nominee =====
- Travis Wines

==== Primary results ====
Republican primary results
Party	Candidate	Votes	%
Republican	Travis Wines	44,405	100.0
Total votes		44,405	100.0

=== General election ===
==== Predictions ====
Source	Ranking	As of
The Cook Political Report	Safe D	November 5, 2018
Inside Elections	Safe D	November 5, 2018
Sabato's Crystal Ball	Safe D	November 5, 2018
RCP	Safe D	November 5, 2018
Daily Kos	Safe D	November 5, 2018
538	Safe D	November 7, 2018
CNN	Safe D	October 31, 2018
Politico	Safe D	November 4, 2018

==== Endorsements ====
Dan Kildee (D)

Labor unions

- AFL-CIO

Organizations

- End Citizens United

==== Results ====
Michigan's 5th congressional district, 2018
Party	Candidate	Votes	%
Democratic	Dan Kildee (incumbent)	164,502	59.5
Republican	Travis Wines	99,265	35.9
Working Class	Kathy Goodwin	12,646	4.6
Total votes		276,413	100.0
Democratic hold			

== District 6 ==
2018 Michigan's 6th congressional district election
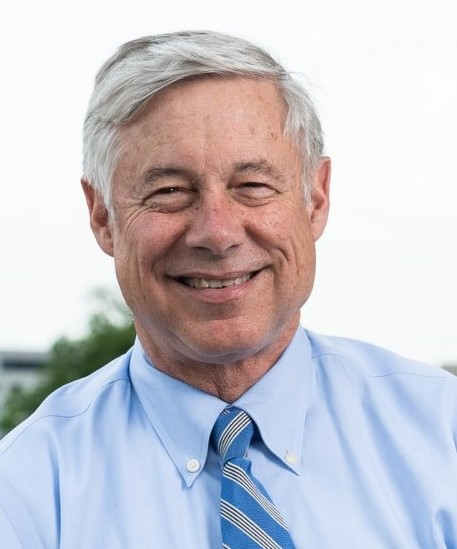

Nominee	Fred Upton	Matthew Longjohn
Party	Republican	Democratic
Popular vote	147,436	134,082
Percentage	50.2%	45.7%
- Upton: 40–50% 50–60% 60–70% 70–80% 80–90% Longjohn: 40–50% 50–60% 60–70% 70–80% 80–90% >90% No votes
U.S. Representative before election
Fred Upton
Republican
Elected U.S. Representative
Fred Upton
Republican

The 6th district is located in Southwestern corner of Michigan, specifically the Michiana region. The district is anchored by Kalamazoo and the surrounding areas including Benton Harbor and Niles. This district had a PVI of R+4. The incumbent was Republican Fred Upton, who had represented the district since 1993 and previously represented the 4th district from 1987 to 1993. He was re-elected to a sixteenth term with 59% of the vote in 2016. The Cook Political Report rated this race as "likely Republican".

=== Republican primary ===
==== Candidates ====
===== Nominee =====
- Fred Upton, incumbent U.S. representative

==== Primary results ====
Republican primary results
Party	Candidate	Votes	%
Republican	Fred Upton (incumbent)	64,512	100.0
Total votes		64,512	100.0

=== Democratic primary ===
==== Candidates ====
===== Nominee =====
- Matt Longjohn, physician and former National Health Officer for the YMCA

===== Eliminated in primary =====
- David Benac, professor
- Rich Eichholz, businessman and biologist
- George Franklin, former Kellogg Company executive

Failed to qualify

- Paul Clements, professor and nominee for this seat in 2014 and 2016
- Eponine Garrod, local activist and quality control chemist

===== Declined =====
- Mark Schauer, former U.S. Representative and nominee for governor in 2014

==== Endorsements ====
George Franklin

Statewide officials

- James Blanchard, former governor
- Jennifer Granholm, former governor

Individuals

- Mark Bernstein, member of the University of Michigan Board of Regents

==== Primary results ====
Democratic primary results
Party	Candidate	Votes	%
Democratic	Matt Longjohn	22,412	37.0
Democratic	George Franklin	17,493	28.9
Democratic	David Benac	12,867	21.3
Democratic	Rich Eichholz	7,719	12.8
Total votes		60,491	100.0

=== General election ===
==== Endorsements ====
Matt Longjohn (D)

Labor unions

- AFL-CIO

Organizations

- End Citizens United
- Sunrise Movement

==== Polling ====
Poll source	Date(s) administered	Sample size	Margin of error	Fred Upton (R)	Matt Longjohn (D)	Stephen Young (T)	Undecided
Change Research (D)	November 2–4, 2018	460	–	40%	42%	3%	14%
Change Research (D)	October 27–29, 2018	466	–	46%	43%	–	–
DCCC (D)	October 9–10, 2018	605	± 4.2%	49%	46%	–	–
Public Policy Polling (D)	September 4–5, 2018	750	–	45%	41%	–	–
Global Strategy Group (D-Longjohn)	August 24–29, 2018	500	± 4.4%	47%	41%	3%	9%

Hypothetical polling

Poll source	Date(s) administered	Sample size	Margin of error	Fred Upton (R)	Democratic opponent (D)	Other	Undecided
Public Policy Polling (D)	November 8–9, 2017	681	± 3.8%	42%	41%	–	17%

==== Predictions ====
Source	Ranking	As of
The Cook Political Report	Lean R	November 5, 2018
Inside Elections	Likely R	November 5, 2018
Sabato's Crystal Ball	Lean R	November 5, 2018
RCP	Lean R	November 5, 2018
Daily Kos	Lean R	November 5, 2018
538	Likely R	November 7, 2018

==== Results ====
Michigan's 6th congressional district, 2018
Party	Candidate	Votes	%
Republican	Fred Upton (incumbent)	147,436	50.2
Democratic	Matt Longjohn	134,082	45.7
U.S. Taxpayers'	Stephen Young	11,920	4.1
Total votes		293,438	100.0
Republican hold			

== District 7 ==
2018 Michigan's 7th congressional district election
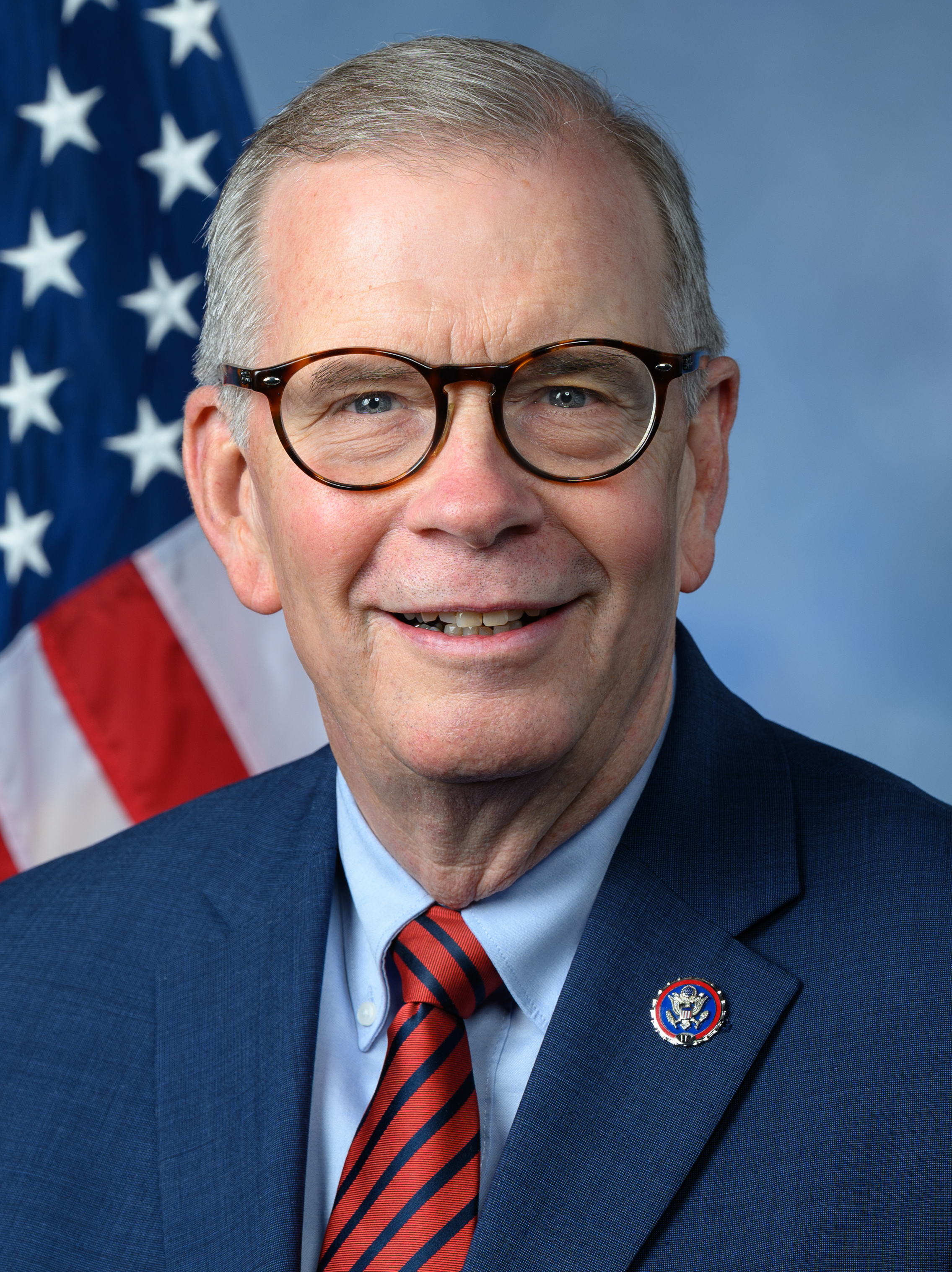

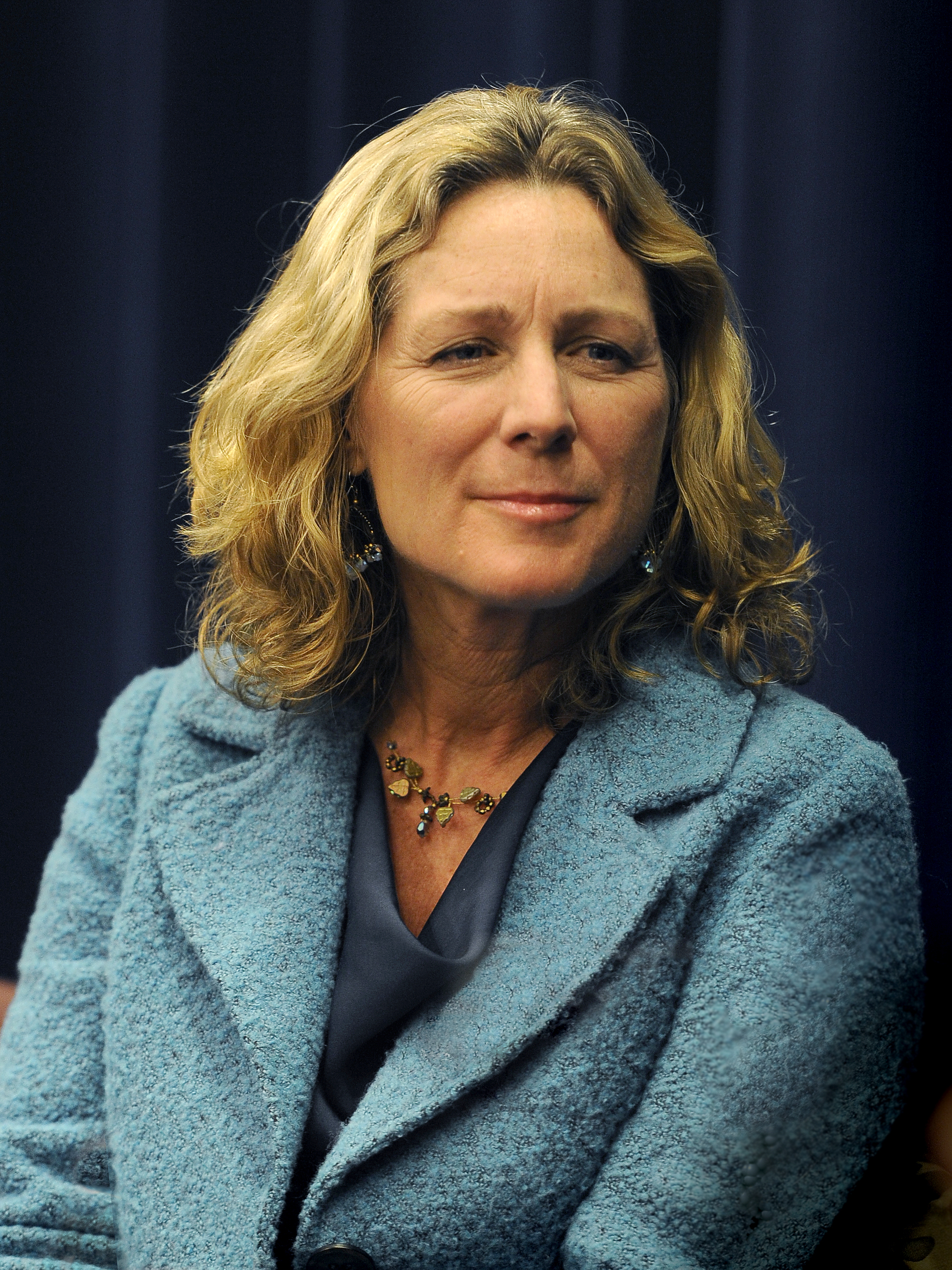
Nominee	Tim Walberg	Gretchen Driskell
Party	Republican	Democratic
Popular vote	158,730	136,330
Percentage	53.8%	46.2%
- Walberg: 50–60% 60–70% 70–80% 80–90% >90% Driskell: 50–60% 60–70% 70–80% 80–90% No votes
U.S. Representative before election
Tim Walberg
Republican
Elected U.S. Representative
Tim Walberg
Republican

The 7th district is located in Southern Michigan including downtown Lansing and the western suburbs of Ann Arbor including Lodi and Milan, other cities include Adrian, Coldwater, and Jackson. This district had a PVI of R+7. The incumbent was Republican Tim Walberg, who had represented the district since 2011 and previously represented the district from 2007 to 2009. He was re-elected to a fourth consecutive and fifth total term with 55% of the vote in 2016. The Cook Political Report rated this race as "likely Republican".

=== Republican primary ===
==== Candidates ====
===== Nominee =====
- Tim Walberg, incumbent U.S. representative

==== Primary results ====
Republican primary results
Party	Candidate	Votes	%
Republican	Tim Walberg (incumbent)	69,248	100.0
Total votes		69,248	100.0

=== Democratic primary ===
Michigan's 7th district was included on the initial list of Republican held seats being targeted by the Democratic Congressional Campaign Committee in 2018.

==== Candidates ====
===== Nominee =====
- Gretchen Driskell, former state representative, former Saline mayor and nominee for this seat in 2016

===== Eliminated in primary =====
- Steven Friday, social worker

==== Primary results ====
Democratic primary results
Party	Candidate	Votes	%
Democratic	Gretchen Driskell	52,430	85.2
Democratic	Steven Friday	9,083	14.8
Total votes		61,513	100.0

=== General election ===
==== Endorsements ====
Gretchen Driskell (D)

Labor unions

- AFL-CIO

Organizations

- EMILY's List
- End Citizens United
- MoveOn

==== Polling ====
Poll source	Date(s) administered	Sample size	Margin of error	Gretchen Driskell (D)	Tim Walberg (R)	Undecided
DCCC (D)	February 19–21, 2018	400	–	37%	41%	–

==== Predictions ====
Source	Ranking	As of
The Cook Political Report	Likely R	November 5, 2018
Inside Elections	Likely R	November 5, 2018
Sabato's Crystal Ball	Likely R	November 5, 2018
RCP	Lean R	November 5, 2018
Daily Kos	Likely R	November 5, 2018
538	Tossup	November 7, 2018

==== Results ====
Michigan's 7th congressional district, 2018
Party	Candidate	Votes	%
Republican	Tim Walberg (incumbent)	158,730	53.8
Democratic	Gretchen Driskell	136,330	46.2
Total votes		295,060	100.0
Republican hold			

== District 8 ==
2018 Michigan's 8th congressional district election
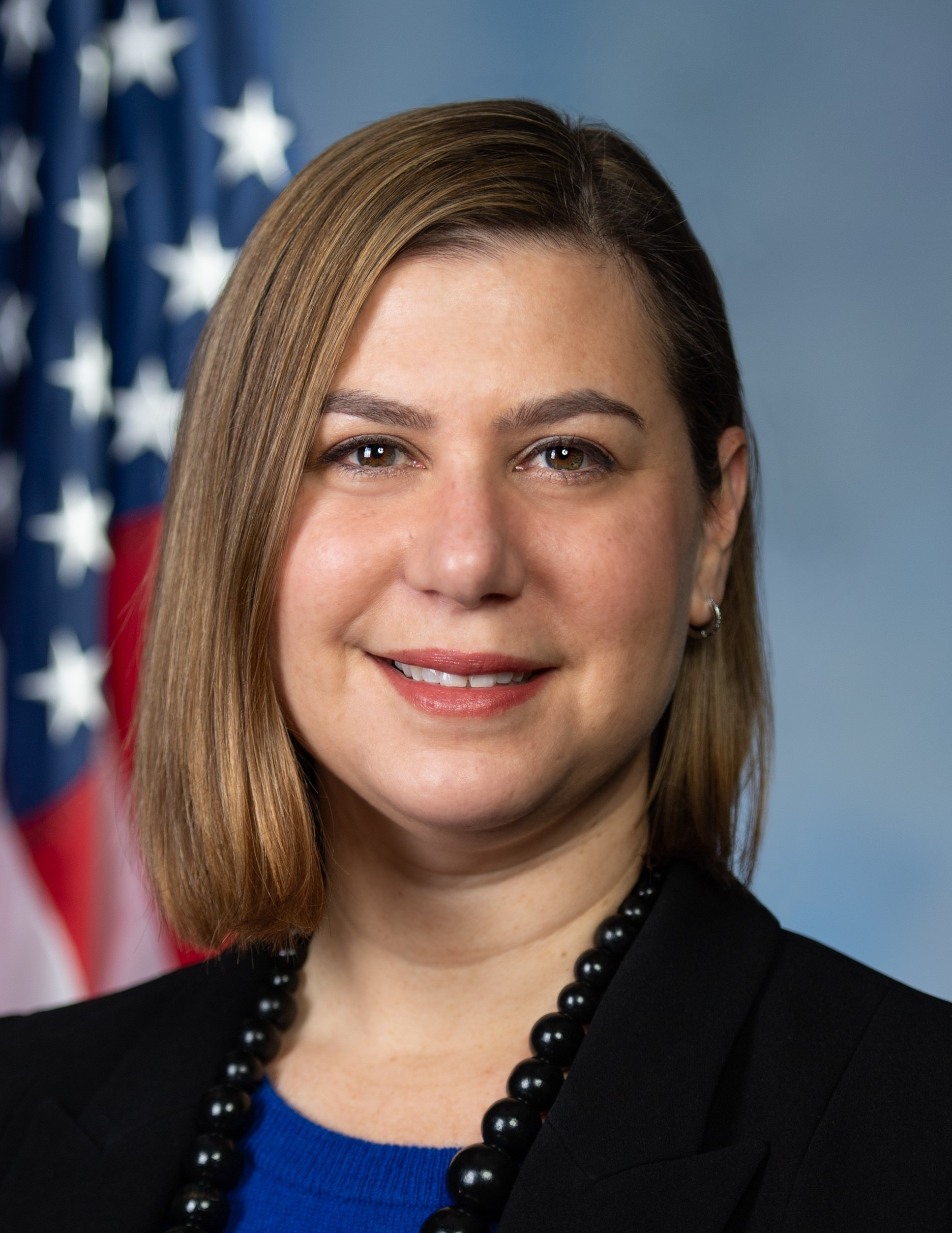

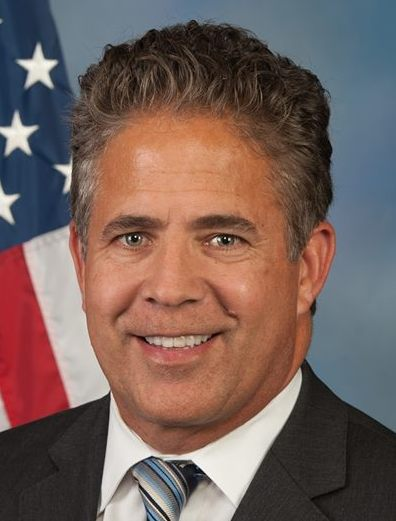
Nominee	Elissa Slotkin	Mike Bishop
Party	Democratic	Republican
Popular vote	172,880	159,782
Percentage	50.6%	46.8%
- Slotkin: 40–50% 50–60% 60–70% 70–80% 80–90% >90% Bishop: 40–50% 50–60% 60–70% 70–80% No votes
U.S. Representative before election
Mike Bishop
Republican
Elected U.S. Representative
Elissa Slotkin
Democratic

The 8th district was centered on the state capital, Lansing, and stretches into the northern outskirts of Metro Detroit including Rochester Hills. This district had a PVI of R+4. The incumbent was Republican Mike Bishop, who had represented the district since 2015. He was re-elected to a second term with 56% of the vote in 2016. This race was considered competitive, with the Cook Political Report rating it as "Tossup" in August 2018. With $28 million spent, it drew the most campaign spending for a U.S. House seat in Michigan's history. Elissa Slotkin defeated Bishop, flipping the district to the Democratic side.

=== Republican primary ===
==== Candidates ====
===== Nominee =====
- Mike Bishop, incumbent U.S. representative

===== Eliminated in primary =====
- Lokesh Kumar

==== Primary results ====
Republican primary results
Party	Candidate	Votes	%
Republican	Mike Bishop (incumbent)	75,403	92.3
Republican	Lokesh Kumar	6,254	7.7
Total votes		81,657	100.0

=== Democratic primary ===
Michigan's 8th district had been included on the initial list of Republican held seats being targeted by the Democratic Congressional Campaign Committee in 2018.

==== Candidates ====
===== Nominee =====
- Elissa Slotkin, former acting Assistant Secretary of Defense for International Security Affairs and former United States National Security Council official

===== Eliminated in primary =====
- Christopher E. Smith, professor of criminal justice

===== Failed to qualify =====
- Darlene Domanik, attorney

==== Primary results ====
Democratic primary results
Party	Candidate	Votes	%
Democratic	Elissa Slotkin	57,819	70.7
Democratic	Christopher E. Smith	23,996	29.3
Total votes		81,815	100.0

=== Libertarian party ===
- Brian Ellison

Libertarian primary results
Party	Candidate	Votes	%
Libertarian	Brian Ellison	522	100.0
Total votes		522	100.0

=== General election ===
==== Endorsements ====
Elissa Slotkin (D)

Labor unions

- AFL-CIO

Organizations

- EMILY's List
- End Citizens United

Newspapers

- Detroit Free Press

==== Debates ====
- Complete video of debate, October 5, 2018

==== Polling ====
View source data.

Poll source	Date(s) administered	Sample size	Margin of error	Mike Bishop (R)	Elissa Slotkin (D)	Other	Undecided
Change Research (D)	November 2–4, 2018	501	–	46%	47%	3%	5%
NYT Upshot/Siena College	October 31 – November 4, 2018	447	± 5.0%	42%	49%	2%	6%
Target Insyght	October 15–17, 2018	500	± 4.5%	48%	45%	3%	4%
NYT Upshot/Siena College	September 28 – October 3, 2018	501	± 4.8%	47%	44%	–	10%
GQR Research (D-Slotkin)	September 17–20, 2018	400	± 4.9%	43%	47%	–	10%
Public Opinion Strategies (R-Bishop)	September 16–18, 2018	400	± 4.9%	45%	43%	–	–
Public Policy Polling (D)	April 16–17, 2018	668	± 3.8%	46%	41%	–	13%
Target Insyght	April 3–5, 2018	400	± 5.0%	45%	39%	–	16%

==== Predictions ====
Source	Ranking	As of
The Cook Political Report	Tossup	November 5, 2018
Inside Elections	Tilt D (flip)	November 5, 2018
Sabato's Crystal Ball	Lean D (flip)	November 5, 2018
RCP	Tossup	November 5, 2018
Daily Kos	Tossup	November 5, 2018
538	Lean D (flip)	November 7, 2018

==== Results ====
Michigan's 8th congressional district, 2018
Party	Candidate	Votes	%
Democratic	Elissa Slotkin	172,880	50.6
Republican	Mike Bishop (incumbent)	159,782	46.8
Libertarian	Brian Ellison	6,302	1.8
U.S. Taxpayers'	David Lillis	2,629	0.8
Total votes		341,593	100.0
Democratic gain from Republican			

== District 9 ==
2018 Michigan's 9th congressional district election
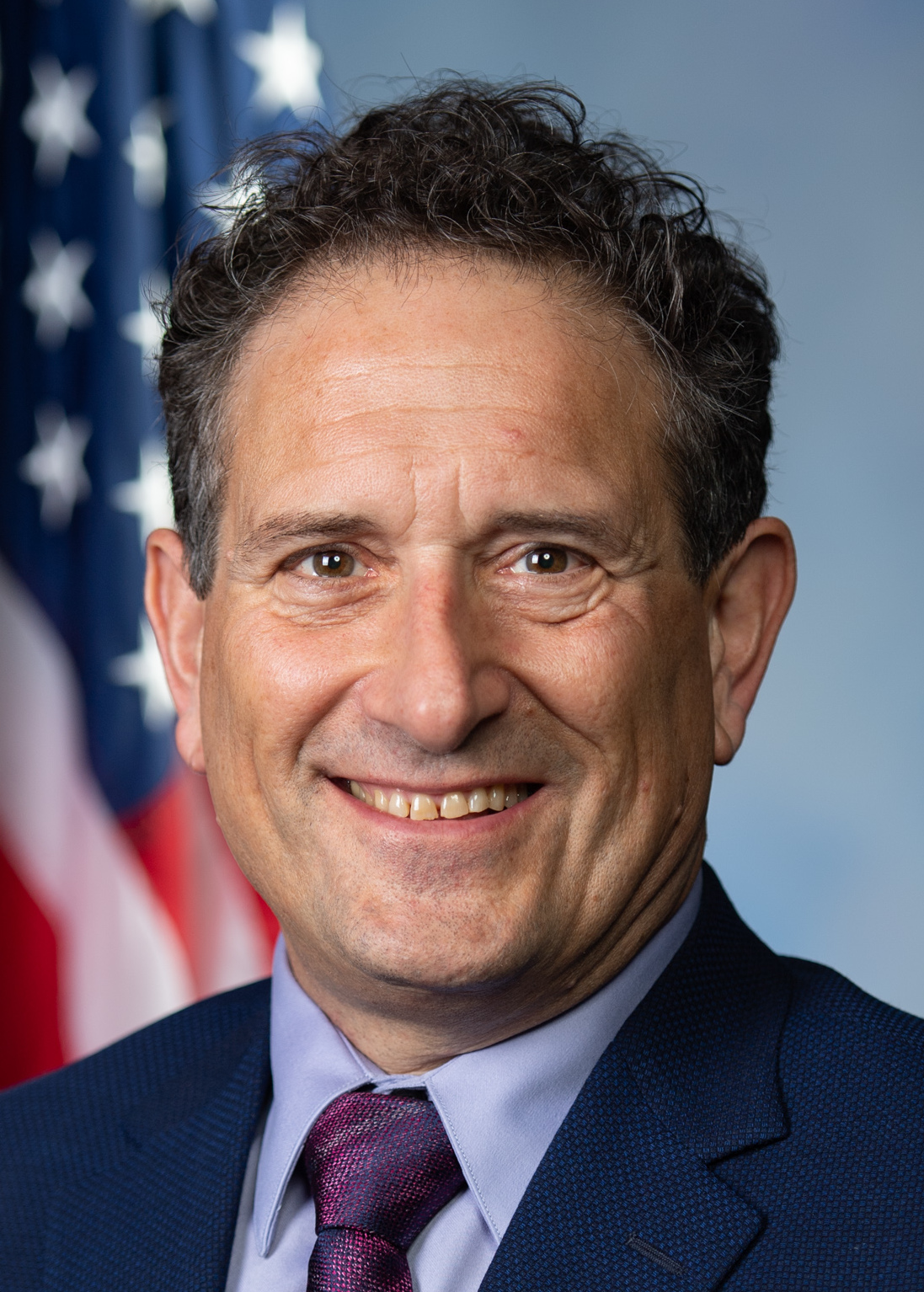

Nominee	Andy Levin	Candius Stearns
Party	Democratic	Republican
Popular vote	181,734	112,123
Percentage	59.7%	36.8%
- Levin: 40–50% 50–60% 60–70% 70–80% 80–90% >90% Stearns: 40–50% 50–60% 60–70% No votes
U.S. Representative before election
Sander Levin
Democratic
Elected U.S. Representative
Andy Levin
Democratic

The 9th district is located in Metro Detroit including Roseville, Royal Oak, and Warren. This district had a PVI of D+4. The incumbent was Democrat Sander Levin, who had represented the district since 2013 and previously represented the 12th district from 1993 to 2013 and the 17th district from 1983 to 1993. He was re-elected to an eighteenth term with 58% of the vote in 2016. In December 2017, Levin announced his retirement, and that he would not seek re-election in 2018.

=== Democratic primary ===
==== Candidates ====
===== Nominee =====
- Andy Levin, former director of the Michigan Department of Energy, Labor and Economic Growth and son of incumbent Sander Levin

===== Eliminated in primary =====
- Martin Brook, attorney
- Ellen Lipton, former state representative

===== Withdrawn =====
- Steve Bieda, state senator

===== Declined =====
- Sander Levin, incumbent representative
- Andy Meisner, Oakland County Treasurer

==== Endorsements ====
Andy Levin

Federal officials

- Rep. Dan Kildee, MI-5

Current and former state officials

- Fmr. Gov. Jennifer Granholm
Ellen Lipton

Organizations

- EMILY's List

==== Polling ====
Poll source	Date(s) administered	Sample size	Margin of error	Martin Brook	Andy Levin	Ellen Lipton	Undecided
EPIC-MRA	July 25–26, 2018	730	± 3.7%	4%	55%	31%	10%
Lake Research Partners (D-Levin)	July 9–12, 2018	400	± 4.9%	4%	51%	12%	30%

Hypothetical polling

Poll source	Date(s) administered	Sample size	Margin of error	Steve Bieda	Andy Levin	Ellen Lipton	Undecided	
GQR Research	March 17–19, 2018	400	± 4.9%	17%	—	42%	8%	33%

==== Primary results ====
Democratic primary results by precinct Levin: 40–50%; 50–60%; 60–70%; Lipton: 40–50%; 50–60%; 60–70%; 70–80%; Tie: 40–50%

Democratic primary results
Party	Candidate	Votes	%
Democratic	Andy Levin	49,612	52.4
Democratic	Ellen Lipton	40,174	42.5
Democratic	Martin Brook	4,865	5.1
Total votes		94,651	100.0

=== Republican primary ===
Michigan's 9th district was included on the initial list of Democratic held seats being targeted by the National Republican Congressional Committee in 2018.

==== Candidates ====
===== Nominee =====
- Candius Stearns, businesswoman

==== Primary results ====
Republican primary results
Party	Candidate	Votes	%
Republican	Candius Stearns	47,410	100.0
Total votes		47,410	100.0

=== General election ===
==== Predictions ====
Source	Ranking	As of
The Cook Political Report	Safe D	November 5, 2018
Inside Elections	Safe D	November 5, 2018
Sabato's Crystal Ball	Safe D	November 5, 2018
RCP	Safe D	November 5, 2018
Daily Kos	Safe D	November 5, 2018
538	Safe D	November 7, 2018
CNN	Safe D	October 31, 2018
Politico	Safe D	November 4, 2018

==== Endorsements ====
Andy Levin (D)

Labor unions

- AFL-CIO

Organizations

- End Citizens United

Newspapers

- Detroit Free Press

==== Results ====
Michigan's 9th congressional district, 2018
Party	Candidate	Votes	%
Democratic	Andy Levin	181,734	59.7
Republican	Candius Stearns	112,123	36.8
Working Class	Andrea Kirby	6,797	2.2
Green	John McDermott	3,909	1.3
Total votes		304,563	100.0
Democratic hold			

== District 10 ==
2018 Michigan's 10th congressional district election
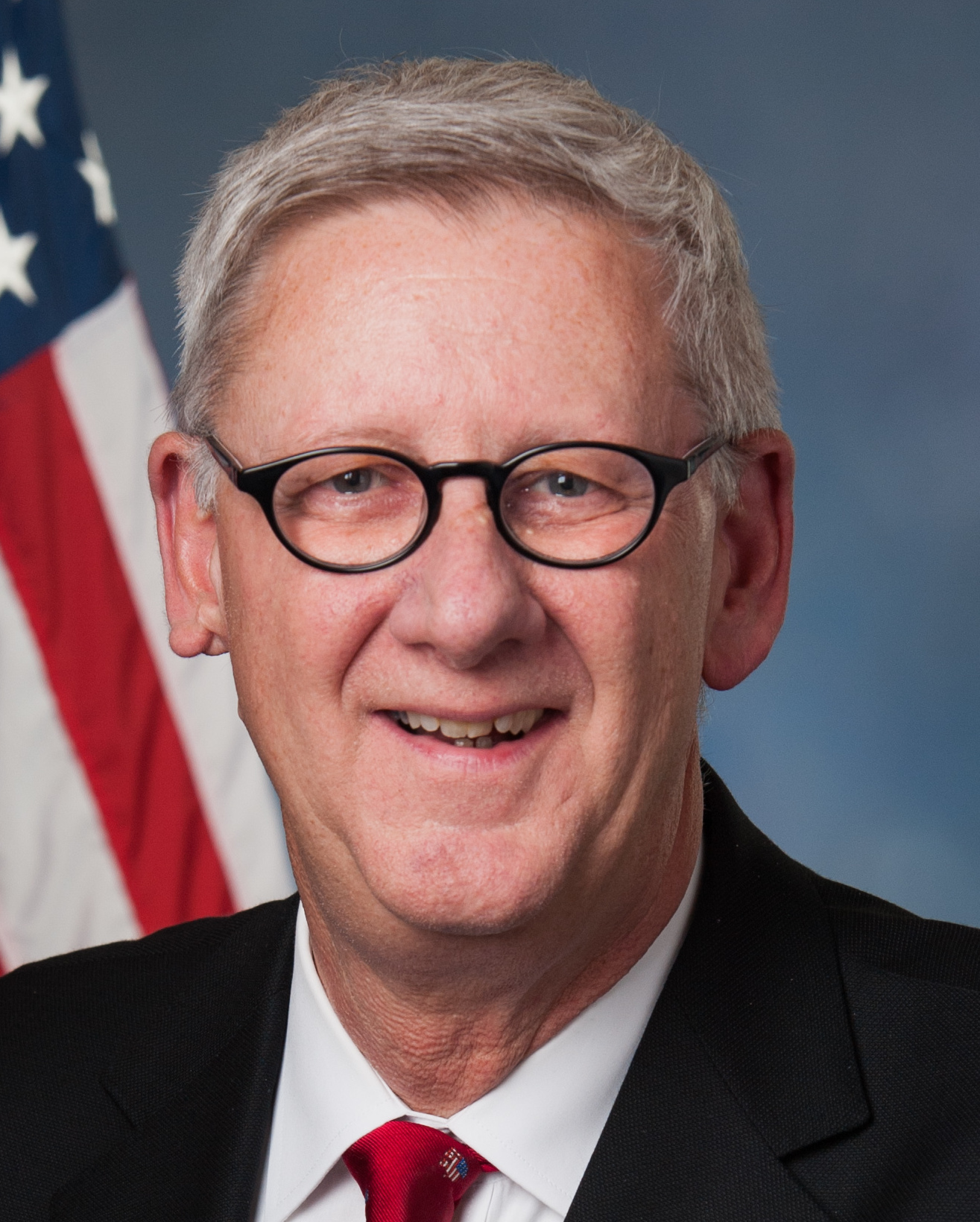

Nominee	Paul Mitchell	Kimberly Bizon
Party	Republican	Democratic
Popular vote	182,808	106,061
Percentage	60.8%	35.0%
- Mitchell: 40–50% 50–60% 60–70% 70–80% 80–90% >90% Bizon: 40–50% 50–60% 60–70% No votes
U.S. Representative before election
Paul Mitchell
Republican
Elected U.S. Representative
Paul Mitchell
Republican

The 10th district is located in an area of the Lower Peninsula of Michigan known as The Thumb and parts of the Metro Detroit area including Chesterfield, Macomb, and Port Huron. This was the most Republican friendly district, with a PVI of R+13. The incumbent was Republican Paul Mitchell, who had represented the district since 2017. He was elected to replace retiring representative Candice Miller with 63% of the vote in 2016.

=== Republican primary ===
==== Candidates ====
===== Nominee =====
- Paul Mitchell, incumbent U.S. representative

==== Primary results ====
Republican primary results
Party	Candidate	Votes	%
Republican	Paul Mitchell (incumbent)	81,867	100.0
Total votes		81,867	100.0

=== Democratic primary ===
==== Candidates ====
===== Nominee =====
- Kimberly Bizon

===== Eliminated in primary =====
- Frank Accavitti Jr.
- Michael McCarthy

==== Primary results ====
Democratic primary results
Party	Candidate	Votes	%
Democratic	Kimberly Bizon	21,944	41.1
Democratic	Frank Accavitti Jr.	17,047	32.0
Democratic	Michael McCarthy	14,353	26.9
Total votes		53,344	100.0

=== General election ===
==== Predictions ====
Source	Ranking	As of
The Cook Political Report	Safe R	November 5, 2018
Inside Elections	Safe R	November 5, 2018
Sabato's Crystal Ball	Safe R	November 5, 2018
RCP	Safe R	November 5, 2018
Daily Kos	Safe R	November 5, 2018
538	Safe R	November 7, 2018
CNN	Safe R	October 31, 2018
Politico	Safe R	November 4, 2018

==== Endorsements ====
Kimberly Bizon (D)

Labor unions

- AFL-CIO

==== Results ====
Michigan's 10th congressional district, 2018
Party	Candidate	Votes	%
Republican	Paul Mitchell (incumbent)	182,808	60.8
Democratic	Kimberly Bizon	106,061	35.0
Independent	Jeremy Peruski	11,344	3.7
Green	Harley Mikkelson	2,851	0.9
Total votes		303,064	100.0
Republican hold			

== District 11 ==
2018 Michigan's 11th congressional district election
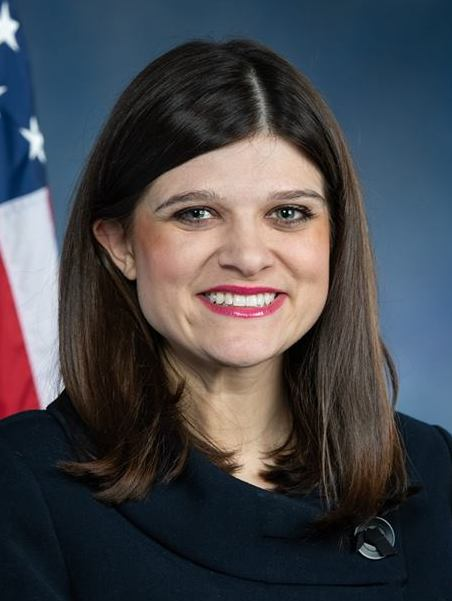

Nominee	Haley Stevens	Lena Epstein
Party	Democratic	Republican
Popular vote	181,912	158,463
Percentage	51.8%	45.2%
- Stevens: 40–50% 50–60% 60–70% 70–80% 80–90% Epstein: 40–50% 50–60% 60–70% 70–80% No votes
U.S. Representative before election
Dave Trott
Republican
Elected U.S. Representative
Haley Stevens
Democratic

The 11th district is located in Metro Detroit including Livonia, Novi, and Troy. This district had a PVI of R+4. The incumbent was Republican Dave Trott, who had represented the district since 2015. He was re-elected to a second term with 53% of the vote in 2016. Trott was not running for re-election in 2018. This race was considered to be competitive; the Cook Political Report rated this contest as a "toss up".

=== Republican primary ===
==== Candidates ====
===== Nominee =====
- Lena Epstein, businesswoman and Michigan co-chair of the 2016 Donald Trump presidential campaign

===== Eliminated in primary =====
- Kerry Bentivolio, former U.S. Representative
- Klint Kesto, state representative
- Mike Kowall, state senator
- Rocky Raczkowski, former state representative, nominee for U.S. Senate in 2002 and nominee for MI-09 in 2010

===== Withdrawn =====
- Kurt Heise, Plymouth Township Supervisor and former state representative (endorsed Kowall)

===== Failed to qualify =====
- Kristine Bonds, daughter of TV news anchor Bill Bonds. (endorsed Kowall)

===== Declined =====
- Ethan Baker, Troy city councilman and former aide to President Ronald Reagan
- Mike Bouchard, Oakland County sheriff and nominee for U.S. Senate in 2006
- Patrick Colbeck, state senator (running for governor)
- Rory Cooper, former communications director to former House Majority Leader Eric Cantor
- Laura Cox, state representative
- Marty Knollenberg, state senator (running for re-election)
- Mike McCready, State Representative
- Ronna Romney McDaniel, chairwoman of the Republican National Committee
- Jeff Sawka, former vice chair of the Michigan Republican Party
- Dave Trott, incumbent U.S. representative

==== Endorsements ====
Mike Kowall

Local officials

- Kurt Heise, Plymouth Township Supervisor
- L. Brooks Patterson, Oakland County Executive

Newspapers

- Detroit Free Press

==== Polling ====
Poll source	Date(s) administered	Sample size	Margin of error	Kerry Bentivolio	Lena Epstein	Klint Kesto	Mike Kowall	Rocky Raczkowski	Undecided
Mitchell Research (R)	July 30, 2018	305	± 5.7%	14%	27%	11%	10%	18%	20%
EPIC-MRA	July 23–24, 2018	700	± 3.7%	7%	26%	12%	8%	19%	28%

==== Primary results ====
Republican primary results
Party	Candidate	Votes	%
Republican	Lena Epstein	26,925	30.9
Republican	Rocky Raczkowski	22,216	25.5
Republican	Mike Kowall	16,011	18.4
Republican	Klint Kesto	12,213	14.0
Republican	Kerry Bentivolio	9,831	11.3
Total votes		87,196	100.0

=== Democratic primary ===
Michigan's 11th district was included on the initial list of Republican held seats being targeted by the Democratic Congressional Campaign Committee in 2018.

==== Candidates ====
===== Nominee =====
- Haley Stevens, former chief of staff for the Presidential Task Force on the Auto Industry

===== Eliminated in primary =====
- Tim Greimel, state representative
- Suneel Gupta, businessman and attorney
- Fayrouz Saad, former Detroit director of immigration affairs
- Nancy Skinner, syndicated radio and TV commentator

===== Failed to qualify =====
- Daniel Haberman, businessman and attorney

===== Declined =====
- Dr. Anil Kumar, physician, candidate for this seat in 2014 and nominee in 2016
- Barbara McQuade, former United States Attorney for the Eastern District of Michigan

==== Endorsements ====
Fayrouz Saad

Organizations

- Democracy for America

==== Polling ====
Poll source	Date(s) administered	Sample size	Margin of error	Tim Greimel	Suneel Gupta	Fayrouz Saad	Nancy Skinner	Haley Stevens	Other	Undecided
EPIC-MRA	July 23–24, 2018	700	± 3.7%	21%	14%	10%	4%	17%	—	34%
Target-Insyght	July 16–18, 2018	500	± 4.5%	14%	15%	7%	—	21%	4%	39%

==== Primary results ====
Democratic primary results
Party	Candidate	Votes	%
Democratic	Haley Stevens	24,309	27.0
Democratic	Tim Greimel	19,673	21.8
Democratic	Suneel Gupta	19,250	21.4
Democratic	Fayrouz Saad	17,499	19.4
Democratic	Nancy Skinner	9,407	10.5
Total votes		90,138	100.0

=== Libertarian party ===
- Leonard Schwartz, attorney

Libertarian primary results
Party	Candidate	Votes	%
Libertarian	Leonard Schwartz	536	100.0
Total votes		536	100.0

=== General election ===
==== Endorsements ====
Lena Epstein (R)

Federal officials

- Mike Pence, vice president of the United States
- Donald Trump, president of the United States

U.S. representatives

- Dave Trott, U.S. representative

Organizations

- Maggie's List
- Susan B. Anthony List
- VIEW PAC

Newspapers

- The Detroit News
Haley Stevens (D)

Labor unions

- AFL-CIO

Organizations

- EMILY's List
- End Citizens United
- MoveOn

Newspapers

- Detroit Free Press

==== Polling ====
Poll source	Date(s) administered	Sample size	Margin of error	Lena Epstein (R)	Haley Stevens (D)	Other	Undecided
Target Insyght	October 15–17, 2018	513	± 4.3%	48%	48%	2%	3%
ALG Research (D-Stevens)	October 10–14, 2018	513	± 4.3%	34%	44%	4%	16%
Harper Polling (R-Epstein)	October 10–13, 2018	465	± 5.0%	35%	36%	2%	27%
NYT Upshot/Siena College	October 1–6, 2018	465	± 5.0%	38%	45%	–	17%

Hypothetical polling

Poll source	Date(s) administered	Sample size	Margin of error	Republican candidate	Democratic candidate	Other	Undecided
Public Policy Polling (D)	February 12–13, 2018	653	± 3.8%	42%	45%	–	13%
Public Policy Polling (D)	October 5–8, 2017	709	± 3.7%	42%	42%	–	16%

==== Predictions ====
Source	Ranking	As of
The Cook Political Report	Lean D (flip)	November 5, 2018
Inside Elections	Tilt D (flip)	November 5, 2018
Sabato's Crystal Ball	Lean D (flip)	November 5, 2018
RCP	Tossup	November 5, 2018
Daily Kos	Lean D (flip)	November 5, 2018
538	Likely D (flip)	November 7, 2018

==== Results ====
Michigan's 11th congressional district, 2018
Party	Candidate	Votes	%
Democratic	Haley Stevens	181,912	51.8
Republican	Lena Epstein	158,463	45.2
Libertarian	Leonard Schwartz	5,799	1.7
Independent	Cooper Nye	4,727	1.3
Total votes		350,901	100.0
Democratic gain from Republican			

== District 12 ==
2018 Michigan's 12th congressional district election
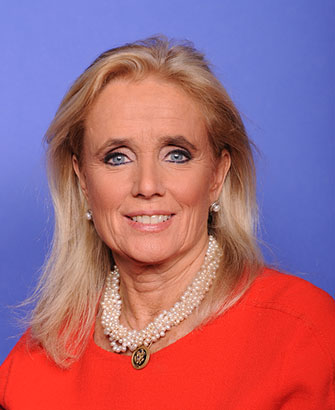

Nominee	Debbie Dingell	Jeff Jones
Party	Democratic	Republican
Popular vote	200,588	85,115
Percentage	68.1%	28.9%
- Dingell: 40–50% 50–60% 60–70% 70–80% 80–90% >90% Jones: 40–50% 50–60% No votes
U.S. Representative before election
Debbie Dingell
Democratic
Elected U.S. Representative
Debbie Dingell
Democratic

The 12th district is based in Ann Arbor and the surrounding cities including Ypsilanti, and the western suburbs of Detroit including Dearborn and Lincoln Park. This district had a PVI of D+14. The incumbent was Democrat Debbie Dingell, who had represented the district since 2015. She was re-elected with 64% of the vote in 2016.

=== Democratic primary ===
==== Candidates ====
===== Nominee =====
- Debbie Dingell, incumbent U.S. representative

==== Primary results ====
Democratic primary results
Party	Candidate	Votes	%
Democratic	Debbie Dingell (incumbent)	103,278	100.0
Total votes		103,278	100.0

=== Republican primary ===
==== Candidates ====
===== Nominee =====
- Jeff Jones

==== Primary results ====
Republican primary results
Party	Candidate	Votes	%
Republican	Jeff Jones	33,839	100.0
Total votes		33,839	100.0

=== General election ===
==== Predictions ====
Source	Ranking	As of
The Cook Political Report	Safe D	November 5, 2018
Inside Elections	Safe D	November 5, 2018
Sabato's Crystal Ball	Safe D	November 5, 2018
RCP	Safe D	November 5, 2018
Daily Kos	Safe D	November 5, 2018
538	Safe D	November 7, 2018
CNN	Safe D	October 31, 2018
Politico	Safe D	November 4, 2018

==== Endorsements ====
Debbie Dingell (D)

Labor unions

- AFL-CIO

Newspapers

- Detroit Free Press

==== Results ====
Michigan's 12th congressional district, 2018
Party	Candidate	Votes	%
Democratic	Debbie Dingell (incumbent)	200,588	68.1
Republican	Jeff Jones	85,115	28.9
Working Class	Gary Walkowicz	6,712	2.3
Independent	Niles Niemuth	2,213	0.7
Total votes		294,628	100.0
Democratic hold			

== District 13 ==
2018 Michigan's 13th congressional district election
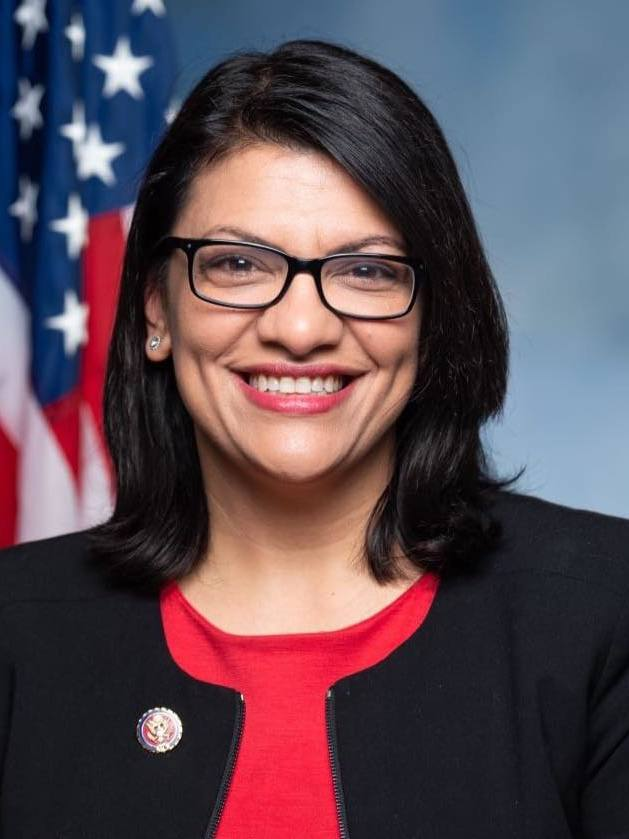

Nominee	Rashida Tlaib	Sam Johnson
Party	Democratic	Working Class
Popular vote	165,355	22,186
Percentage	84.2%	11.3%
- Precinct results Tlaib: 50–60% 60–70% 70–80% 80–90% >90% No votes
U.S. Representative before election
Brenda Jones
Democratic
Elected U.S. Representative
Rashida Tlaib
Democratic

The 13th district is located entirely within Wayne County and is centered on the city of the Detroit and the immediate surrounding suburbs including Dearborn Heights, Garden City, and Westland. This was the most Democratic-friendly district, with a PVI of D+32. The seat was vacant for most of 2018, following the resignation of John Conyers in December 2017. A special primary and special general election were held in August and November 2018, on dates coinciding with the already scheduled primary and general elections in a money-saving move by Michigan Governor Rick Snyder.

Conyers represented the district from 2013 to 2017. He previously represented the 14th district from 1993 to 2013, and the 1st district from 1965 to 1993. He was Dean of the United States House of Representatives, and was re-elected to a twenty-seventh term with 77% of the vote in 2016.

Former state representative Rashida Tlaib, a member of Democratic Socialists of America, won the Democratic primary. Tlaib, however, lost the special primary to Brenda Jones, president of the Detroit City Council. Jones served for the final 35 days of the unexpired term before Tlaib was sworn in.

=== Democratic primary ===
==== Candidates ====
===== Nominee =====
- Rashida Tlaib, former state representative

===== Eliminated in primary =====
- Ian Conyers, state senator
- Shanelle Jackson, former state representative and candidate for MI-13 in 2012
- Brenda Jones, president of the Detroit City Council
- Bill Wild, mayor of Westland
- Coleman Young II, state senator and candidate for mayor of Detroit in 2017

===== Failed to qualify =====
- John Conyers III, hedge fund manager and son of U.S. representative John Conyers
- Sherry Gay-Dagnogo, state representative
- Kimberly Hill Knott, government relations, environmental justice

Withdrew

- Michael Gilmore, attorney and activist

Declined

- John Conyers, incumbent U.S. representative

==== Endorsements ====
Brenda Jones

U.S. representatives

- Rep. Brenda Lawrence (MI-14)

State legislators

- State Rep. Sylvia Santana

Local officials

- Mike Duggan, mayor of Detroit
- Warren Evans, Wayne County Executive
- Eric Sabree, Wayne County Treasurer

Organizations

- Communications Workers of America
- Michigan AFL-CIO
- United Automobile Workers

Individuals

- Greg Mathis, judge and television personality
Rashida Tlaib

U.S. representatives

- Rep. Pramila Jayapal (WA-7)
- Rep. Ro Khanna (CA-17)
- Former Rep. Mark Schauer (MI-7)

State legislators

- State Rep. Stephanie Chang

Organizations

- 350 Action
- Clean Water Action
- Climate Hawks Vote
- Democracy for America
- End Citizens United
- Justice Democrats
- Our Revolution
- People for Bernie
- Progressive Change Campaign Committee

Local officials

- Ilona Varga, Wayne County Commissioner from District 4

Individuals

- Michael Moore, filmmaker
Coleman Young II

State legislators

- State Rep. Ken Daniels
- State Rep. Fred Durhal III
- State Rep. Bettie Cook Scott

==== Polling ====
Poll source	Date(s) administered	Sample size	Margin of error	Ian Conyers	Shanelle Jackson	Brenda Jones	Rashida Tlaib	Bill Wild	Coleman Young	Undecided
EPIC-MRA	July 25–26, 2018	700	± 3.7%	7%	5%	26%	22%	20%	9%	11%
Target-Insyght	July 16–18, 2018	600	± 4.0%	8%	4%	21%	19%	20%	14%	14%

==== Debate ====
2018 Michigan's 13th congressional district Democratic primary debate
No.	Date	Host	Moderator	Link	Democratic	Democratic	Democratic	Democratic	Democratic	Democratic
Key: P Participant A Absent N Not invited I Invited W Withdrawn										
Key: P Participant A Absent N Not invited I Invited W Withdrawn					Ian Conyers	Shanelle Jackson	Brenda Jones	Rashida Tlaib	Bill Wild	Coleman Young II
1	Aug. 2, 2018	WDIV-TV	Devin Scillian		P	P	P	P	P	P

==== Primary results ====
Democratic primary results by precinct Tlaib: 20–30%; 30–40%; 40–50%; 50–60%; 60–70%; 70–80%; 80–90%; >90%; Jones: 20–30%; 30–40%; 40–50%; 50–60%; >90%; Wild: 20–30%; 30–40%; 40–50%; 50–60%; 60–70%; Young: 20–30%; 30–40%; 40–50%; >90%; Tie: 20–30%; 30–40%; 40–50%; 50%

Democratic primary results
Party	Candidate	Votes	%
Democratic	Rashida Tlaib	27,841	31.2
Democratic	Brenda Jones	26,941	30.2
Democratic	Bill Wild	12,613	14.1
Democratic	Coleman Young II	11,172	12.5
Democratic	Ian Conyers	5,866	6.6
Democratic	Shanelle Jackson	4,853	5.4
Democratic	Kimberly Hill Knott (write-in)	33	0.0
Democratic	Royce Kinniebrew (write-in)	2	0.0
Total votes		89,321	100.0

=== Republican primary ===
David Dudenhoefer was the only Republican candidate to announce his run for the Republican nomination, but he failed to qualify. He did, however, run as a write-in candidate. As a result, Tlaib was opposed in the general election only by minor party candidates and write-in candidates.

==== Candidates ====
===== Failed to qualify =====
- David A. Dudenhoefer, district GOP chair

==== Primary results ====
Republican primary results
Party	Candidate	Votes	%
Republican	David Anthony Dudenhoefer (write-in)	420	14.9
Republican	Other write-ins	2,391	85.1
Total votes		2,811	100.0

=== General election ===
==== Predictions ====
Source	Ranking	As of
The Cook Political Report	Safe D	November 5, 2018
Inside Elections	Safe D	November 5, 2018
Sabato's Crystal Ball	Safe D	November 5, 2018
RCP	Safe D	November 5, 2018
Daily Kos	Safe D	November 5, 2018
538	Safe D	November 7, 2018
CNN	Safe D	October 31, 2018
Politico	Safe D	November 4, 2018

==== Endorsements ====
Rashida Tlaib (D)

U.S. representatives

- Rep. Pramila Jayapal (WA-7)
- Rep. Ro Khanna (CA-17)
- Former Rep. Mark Schauer (MI-7)

Labor unions

- AFL-CIO

Organizations

- 350 Action
- Climate Hawks Vote
- Democracy for America
- EMILY's List
- End Citizens United
- Justice Democrats
- MoveOn
- Our Revolution
- Sunrise Movement

Newspapers

- Detroit Free Press

==== Results ====
Michigan's 13th congressional district, 2018
Party	Candidate	Votes	%
Democratic	Rashida Tlaib	165,355	84.2
Working Class	Sam Johnson	22,186	11.3
Green	D. Etta Wilcoxon	7,980	4.1
Independent	Brenda Jones (write-in)	633	0.3
n/a	Other write-ins	145	0.1
Total votes		196,299	100.0
Democratic hold			

== District 14 ==
2018 Michigan's 14th congressional district election
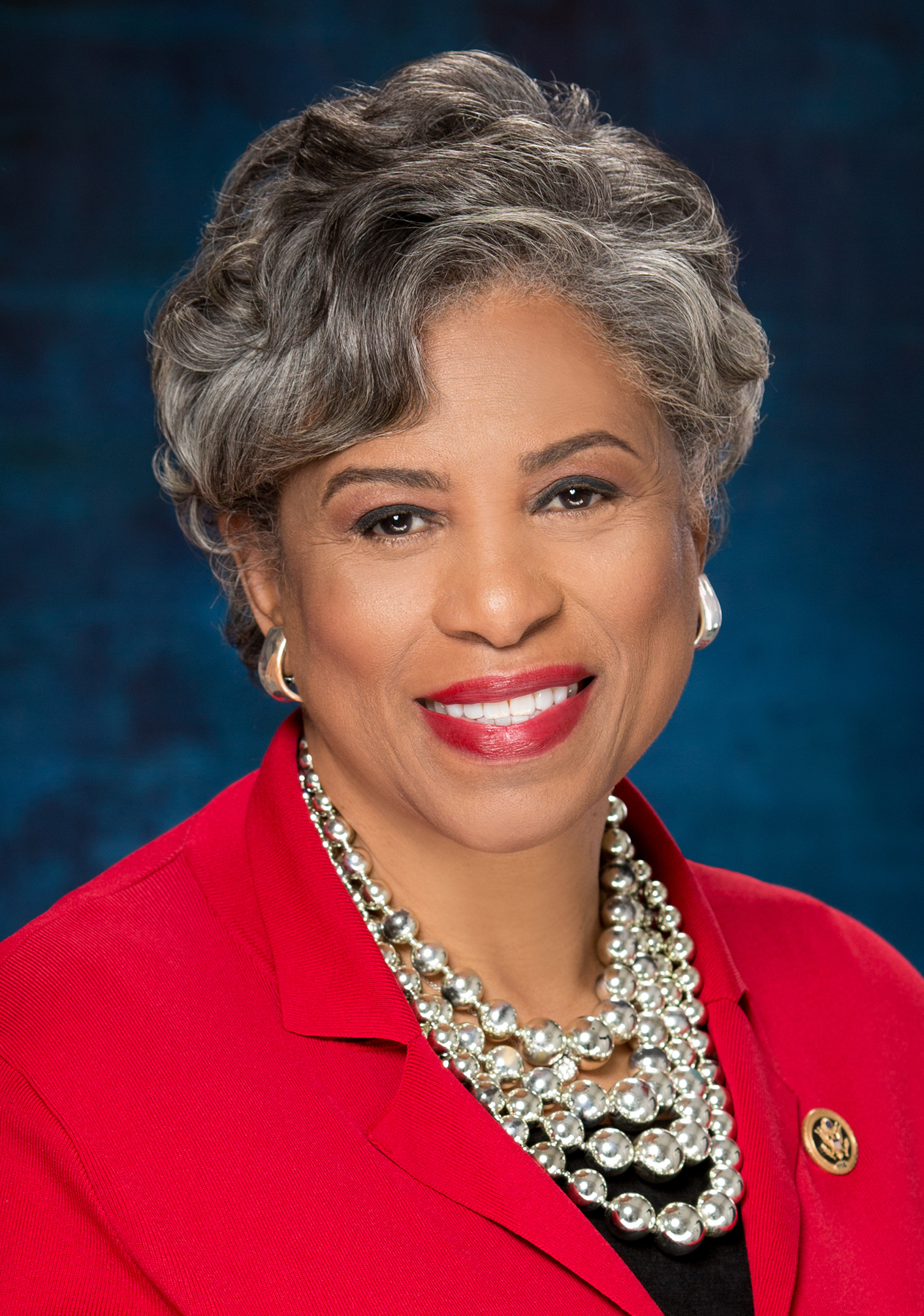

Nominee	Brenda Lawrence	Marc Herschfus
Party	Democratic	Republican
Popular vote	214,334	45,899
Percentage	80.9%	17.3%
- Lawrence: 50–60% 60–70% 70–80% 80–90% >90% Herschfus: 40–50% 50–60% 60–70% 70–80% No votes
U.S. Representative before election
Brenda Lawrence
Democratic
Elected U.S. Representative
Brenda Lawrence
Democratic

The 14th district stretches from the northern Detroit suburbs including Farmington Hills, Southfield, and West Bloomfield, to eastern part of Detroit. This district had a PVI of D+30. The incumbent was Democrat Brenda Lawrence, who had represented the district since 2015. She was re-elected to a second term with 79% of the vote in 2016.

=== Democratic primary ===
==== Candidates ====
===== Nominee =====
- Brenda Lawrence, incumbent U.S. representative

==== Primary results ====
Democratic primary results
Party	Candidate	Votes	%
Democratic	Brenda Lawrence (incumbent)	106,464	100.0
Total votes		106,464	100.0

=== Republican primary ===
==== Candidates ====
===== Nominee =====
- Marc Herschfus

==== Primary results ====
Republican primary results
Party	Candidate	Votes	%
Republican	Marc Herschfus	18,546	100.0
Total votes		18,546	100.0

=== General election ===
==== Predictions ====
Source	Ranking	As of
The Cook Political Report	Safe D	November 5, 2018
Inside Elections	Safe D	November 5, 2018
Sabato's Crystal Ball	Safe D	November 5, 2018
RCP	Safe D	November 5, 2018
Daily Kos	Safe D	November 5, 2018
538	Safe D	November 7, 2018
CNN	Safe D	October 31, 2018
Politico	Safe D	November 4, 2018

==== Endorsements ====
Brenda Lawrence (D)

Labor unions

- AFL-CIO

Newspapers

- Detroit Free Press

==== Results ====
Michigan's 14th congressional district, 2018
Party	Candidate	Votes	%
Democratic	Brenda Lawrence (incumbent)	214,334	80.9
Republican	Marc Herschfus	45,899	17.3
Working Class	Philip Kolodny	4,761	1.8
Total votes		264,994	100.0
Democratic hold			
