= Fayrouz Saad =

American government official

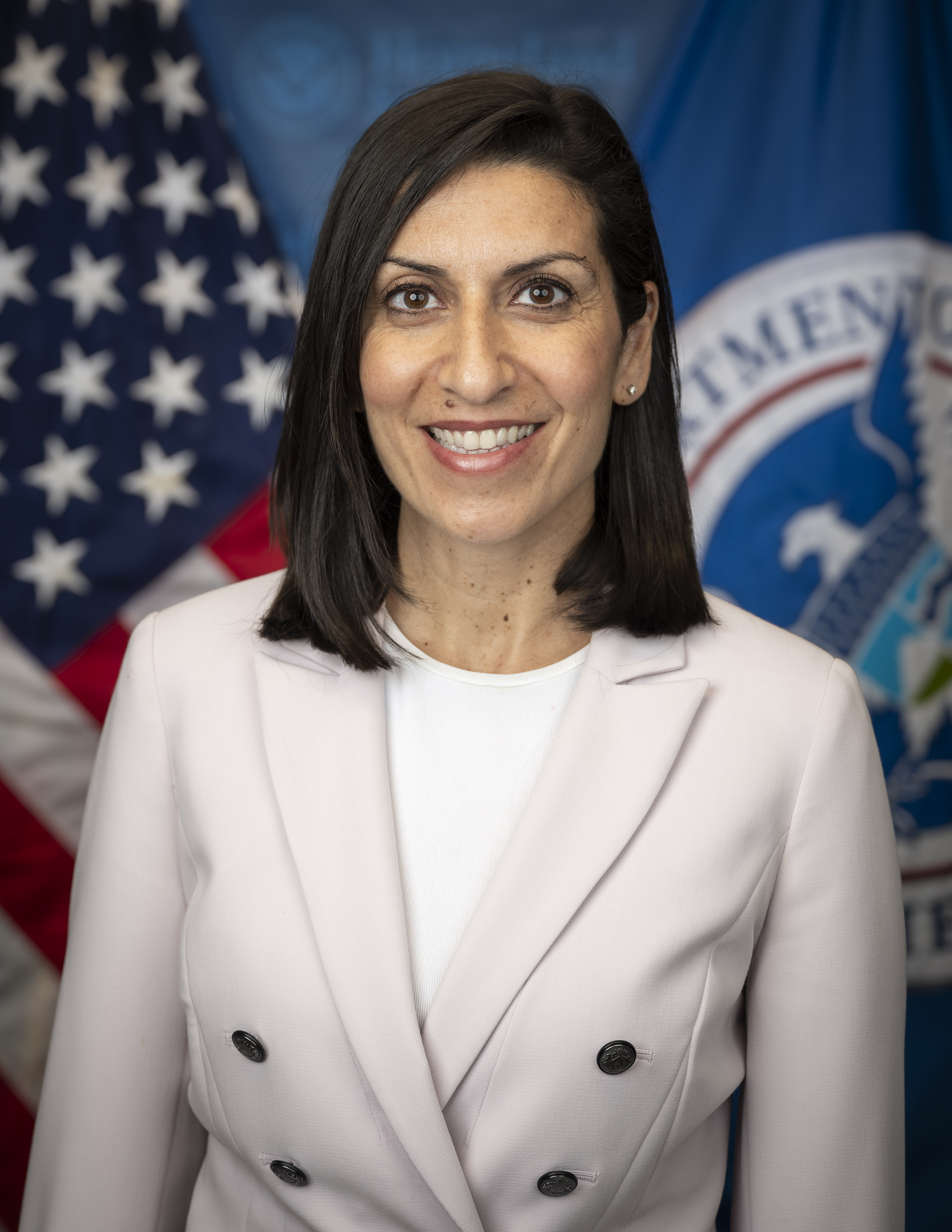

Assistant Secretary of Homeland Security for Partnership and Engagement
- In office February 2024 – January 2025
- President: Joe Biden
- Preceded by: Brenda Abdelall

Personal details
- Born: Dearborn, Michigan, U.S.
- Education: University of Michigan (BA); Harvard University (MPP)

Fayrouz Saad is an American public official and politician. She was the Executive Director of the Office of Global Michigan, and was the first director of the Office of Immigrant Affairs and Economic Inclusion under Detroit Mayor Mike Duggan.

During the Obama administration, Saad served in the Department of Homeland Security (DHS), where she worked on immigration reform, security issues and economic development programs in the Middle East. Before her appointment at DHS, Saad worked as a civic engagement coordinator for the Arab Community Center for Economic and Social Services.

== Early life and education ==
Saad was born and raised in the Arab-majority community of Dearborn, Michigan, as the daughter of Lebanese immigrants who ran meat wholesale business in Detroit. She graduated from the University of Michigan with a double major in political science and psychology, and in 2014 received a master's degreefrom the Harvard Kennedy School, where she studied urban policy and economic development.

== Career ==
Saad's career spans campaign staffing, community organizing and immigration issues at the local, state and national levels. Between 2004-2008, Saad worked as a field organizer for John Kerry's and Gino Polidori's campaigns.

Her organizing work targeted Arab American community relations, voter registration, civic engagement and advocacy strategies through the National Network for Arab American Communities and the Arab Community Center for Economic and Social Services. Saad was Vice President of Chicago-based political advocacy firm Cambridge Global Advisors where she worked with the federal government on the implementation of CVE in the Dearborn community.

During her tenure at DHS, in addition to serving as a liaison between governors, mayors and other local elected officials in the office of Intergovernmental Affairs (IGA), she assisted the department in coordinating community relations between Arab, Muslim, Sikh, South Asian and Somali communities and their law enforcement partners on CVE initiatives.

Saad ran as a Democratic candidate for Michigan's 11th congressional district in the 2018 midterm elections, where she came in fourth place with 19.4 per cent of the votes, losing to Haley Stevens.

== Personal life ==
Saad is married to Chris DeRusha, a former cybersecurity staffer at the Office of Management and Budget who works at Google.
