= Chuck Moss =

American politician (born 1953)

Member of the Michigan House of Representatives from the 40th district
- In office January 1, 2007 – December 31, 2012
- Preceded by: Shelley Taub
- Succeeded by: Mike McCready

Personal details
- Party: Republican
- Spouse: Alice

Charles J. (Chuck) Moss (born 1953) was the Republican State Representative representing the 40th District, which covers the municipalities of Bloomfield Hills, Michigan, Keego Harbor, Michigan, Orchard Lake Village, Michigan, Franklin, Michigan, Bingham Farms, Michigan, Beverly Hills, Michigan and Sylvan Lake, Michigan.

== Biography ==
Moss grew up in Midland, Michigan and graduated from Herbert Henry Dow High School in 1971. He received a B.A. from Michigan State University's James Madison College. He obtained a J.D. from the University of Detroit law school.

Moss is a practicing attorney, and also has an active involvement with Detroit local media. He has hosted a number of shows on WXST, WJIM and was the co-host of "Back to Back" on WTVS. He has also been a freelance writer for the Oakland Press Detroit News, and Computer Gaming World.

He resides in Birmingham with Alice Moss and his two daughters.

== Political career ==
Moss served on the Birmingham Traffic and Safety Board from 1993 to 1997 before being elected to the City Commission. In 2000 he was elected mayor.

Later in 2000, Moss was elected to the Oakland County Commission. He served as the chair of the Finance Committee. He served on the commission until 2006.

In November 2006, Moss was elected to the State House, defeating Democrat Syed Jafry.

In his time in the State House, Moss has attempted to pass legislation easing regulatory burdens by State government. He supported a bill that would Michigan's Department of Environmental Quality's enforcement actions.

He also has introduced legislation that would transfer the management of the Detroit water and sewer system to a regional authority governed by representatives from the City of Detroit, and St. Clair County, Lapeer County, Macomb County, Oakland County, Washtenaw County, Genesee County and Wayne County.

=== Election history ===
Michigan House 40th District Election Results, 2006–present
2006 Candidate	Party	Popular votes	Vote percentage
Chuck Moss	Republican	28,092	65%
Syed Jafry	Democrat	14,880	35%
