= Patricia Godchaux =

American politician

Member of the Michigan House of Representatives from the 40th district
- In office January 1, 1997 – December 31, 2002
- Preceded by: John Jamian
- Succeeded by: Shelley Taub

Patricia "Pan" Godchaux is a moderate Republican who ran for the United States Congress for the 9th federal congressional district in the state of Michigan. She challenged seven-term incumbent Joe Knollenberg in the Republican primary and hoped to get Democratic support, as the Democrats' challenger, Nancy Skinner, didn't have to face a primary contest. She notes that the district is inclined to vote Republican, and that unless citizens of the district want to re-elect a conservative Republican, their best chance to avoid doing so was by placing a moderate on the ballot in November. Ultimately Gochaux failed in her attempt to unseat the seven-term incumbent, garnering 30% of the vote to Knollenberg's 70%, or 20,211 to 46,713 votes.

Godchaux previously served on the Birmingham, Michigan school board and the Michigan House of Representatives. She is a member of Triangle Foundation's Board of Advisors.
