= Michigan's 40th House of Representatives district =

American legislative district

Michigan's 40th State House of Representatives district
Representative
Matthew Longjohn; D–Portage
- Demographics: 76.9% White; 7% Black; 5.8% Hispanic; 4.2% Asian; 0.2% Native American; 0.3% Other; 5.5% Multiracial
- Population (2024): 92,204

Michigan's 40th House of Representatives district is a legislative district within the Michigan House of Representatives located in Kalamazoo County. The district was created in 1965, when the Michigan Supreme Court ordered the reapportionment of state legislative districts from a county-based system to a proportional one following the Supreme Court case Reynolds v. Sims. It is currently represented by Democrat Matt Longjohn of Portage.

== List of representatives ==
Representative	Party	Years	Residence	Notes
Rollo G. Conlin	Republican	1965–1966	Tipton	Reapportioned from the former Lenawee County district.
Robert C. Stites	Republican	1967–1970	Manitou Beach	
John S. Mowat Jr.	Republican	1971–1978	Adrian	
James E. Hadden	Republican	1979–1982	Adrian	
Timothy Lee Walberg	Republican	1983–1992	Tipton	Redistricted to the 57th district.
John E. Jamian	Republican	1993–1996	Bloomfield Hills	Redistricted from the 65th district.
Patricia A.K. Godchaux	Republican	1997–2002	Birmingham	Term limited.
Shelley Goodman Taub	Republican	2003–2006	Bloomfield Township	
Chuck Moss	Republican	2007–2012	Birmingham	Term limited.
Michael McCready	Republican	2013–2018	Bloomfield Hills	Term limited.
Mari Manoogian	Democratic	2019–2022	Birmingham	
Christine Morse	Democratic	2023–2025	Texas Charter Township	Redistricted from the 61st district.
Matt Longjohn	Democratic	2025–present	Portage	

== Historical district boundaries ==
Map	Description	Apportionment Plan	Notes
	Lenawee County (part): Adrian; Adrian Township; Blissfield Township; Clinton Township; Deerfield Township; Dover Township; Fairfield Township; Hudson; Hudson Township; Macon Township; Madison Township; Medina Township; Morenci; Ogden Township; Palmyra Township; Raisin Township; Ridgeway Township; Riga Township; Rollin Township (part); Rome Township; Seneca Township; Tecumseh; Tecumseh Township; Woodstock Township (part)	1964 Apportionment Plan	
	Lenawee County (part): Excluding Rollin Township; Hillsdale County (part): Wright Township	1972 Apportionment Plan	
	Lenawee County	1982 Apportionment Plan	
	Oakland County (part): Birmingham; Bloomfield Hills; Bloomfield Township; Southfield Township; Sylvan Lake	1992 Apportionment Plan	
	Oakland County (part): Birmingham; Bloomfield Hills; Bloomfield Township; Keego Harbor; Orchard Lake Village; Southfield Township; Sylvan Lake	2001 Apportionment Plan	
	Oakland County (part): Birmingham; Bloomfield Township; Bloomfield Hills; West Bloomfield Township (Part)	2011 Apportionment Plan	
	Kalamazoo County (part): Kalamazoo (part); Oshtemo Township (part); Portage (part); Texas Charter Township	2021 Apportionment Plan (Note: Referred to as the Hickory plan.)	

== Recent elections ==
=== 2020s ===
2026 Michigan House of Representatives election
Party	Candidate	Votes	%
Democratic	Matt Longjohn (incumbent)	30,733	64.22
Republican	Robert M. Sitarski	17,121	35.78
Total votes		47,854	100
Democratic hold			

2024 Michigan House of Representatives election
Party	Candidate	Votes	%
Democratic	Matt Longjohn	30,707	57.45
Republican	Kelly Sackett	22,746	42.55
Total votes		53,453	100
Democratic hold			

2022 Michigan House of Representatives election
Party	Candidate	Votes	%
Democratic	Christine Morse	25,989	58.63
Republican	Kelly Sackett	18,338	41.37
Total votes		44,327	100
Democratic hold			

2020 Michigan House of Representatives election
Party	Candidate	Votes	%
Democratic	Mari Manoogian (incumbent)	38,162	57.77
Republican	Kendra Cleary	27,897	42.23
Total votes		66,059	100
Democratic hold			

=== 2010s ===
2018 Michigan House of Representatives election
Party	Candidate	Votes	%
Democratic	Mari Manoogian	30,222	56.6
Republican	David Wolkinson	23,222	43.5
Total votes		53,444	100
Democratic gain from Republican			

2016 Michigan House of Representatives election
Party	Candidate	Votes	%
Republican	Michael McCready	30,664	53.5
Democratic	Nicole Bedi	26,669	46.5
Total votes		57,333	100
Republican hold			

2014 Michigan House of Representatives election
Party	Candidate	Votes	%
Republican	Michael McCready	23,678	57.6
Democratic	Mary Belden	17,408	42.4
Total votes		41,086	100
Republican hold			

2012 Michigan House of Representatives election
Party	Candidate	Votes	%
Republican	Michael McCready	31,913	57.0
Democratic	Dorian Coston	22,757	40.7
Libertarian	Steve Burgis	1,312	2.3
Total votes		55,982	100
Republican hold			

2010 Michigan House of Representatives election
Party	Candidate	Votes	%
Republican	Chuck Moss	27,621	67.4
Democratic	Julie Candler	13,346	32.6
Total votes		40,967	100
Republican hold			

2008 Michigan House of Representatives election
Party	Candidate	Votes	%
Republican	Chuck Moss	31,381	59.8
Democratic	Julie Candler	19,815	37.7
Libertarian	Larry Ross	1,307	2.5
Total votes		52,503	100
Republican hold			
