= Matthew Longjohn =

American politician

Member of the Michigan House of Representatives from the 40th district
- Incumbent
- Assumed office January 1, 2025
- Preceded by: Christine Morse

Personal details
- Born: Kalamazoo, Michigan
- Party: Democratic
- Education: Kalamazoo College (BA); Tulane University (MD, MPH)

Matthew M. Longjohn is an American physician and politician serving as a member of the Michigan House of Representatives since January 2025, representing the 40th district. A member of the Democratic Party, he was the Democratic nominee for Michigan's 6th congressional district in the 2018 elections, losing to incumbent Fred Upton.
