= Shelley Taub =

American politician (1939–2025)

Member of the Michigan House of Representatives from the 40th district
- In office January 1, 2003 – December 31, 2006
- Preceded by: Patricia Godchaux
- Succeeded by: Chuck Moss

Shelley Goodman Taub (July 14, 1939 – February 4, 2025) was a Republican politician who served on the Oakland County, Michigan County Commission and in the Michigan House of Representatives. She resided in Bloomfield Hills, Michigan.

== Biography ==
Taub was born in Detroit in 1939. She received a B.A. in Education from the University of Michigan. She also did post-graduate work at the University of Missouri and University of Kansas. She was religiously Jewish.

She taught elementary school for 30 years and managed her husband's medical practice. She had three children and five grandchildren.

== Political career ==
=== County Commissioner ===
Taub served on the Oakland County Commission from 1983 until 2002 and again from 2009 until 2019. She represented two-thirds of West Bloomfield Township, one-third of Bloomfield Township, and the cities of Keego Harbor, Orchard Lake Village and Sylvan Lake. As commissioner she chaired many activities including the Prescription Task Force, the Children's Summit and the Senior Summit.

=== State representative ===
==== Legislative history ====
In 2002, Taub was elected to represent the 40th District in the Michigan House of Representatives. The district includes Bloomfield and Southfield townships; the cities of Birmingham Bloomfield Hills, Keego Harbor, Orchard Lake Village and Sylvan Lake; and the villages of Beverly Hills, Bingham Farms and Franklin.

As a State Representative Taub focused on healthcare and education. In particular, Taub sponsored legislation capping malpractice suit contingency fees.

While serving in the Michigan House of Representatives, Taub was Chair of the Appropriations Committee's Subcommittee on Transportation. She also was assistant Republican Caucus Chair.

=== 2006 State Senate campaign ===
In 2006, Taub campaigned for a seat in the 13th District of the Michigan Senate. The Republican primary race was originally supposed to be between her and former Rep. Robert Gosselin in a moderately safe Republican district. When Democrat Andy Levin entered the race, however, Republicans feared that his name recognition and fundraising ability (as the son of an Oakland County Congressman and nephew of Michigan's Senator) in the county could make the seat much more competitive.

After John Pappageorge joined the race, Gosselin dropped out in order to run for County Commissioner in Troy.

The competition between Pappageorge and Taub was characterized in the media as fierce. Taub claimed that if she had known that Pappageorge was going to run for the Senate, she would not have run. She put Pappageorge's name as an endorser on about 20,000 fliers that were sent throughout the district. She also claimed that Pappageorge received illegal support from the Senate GOP through the New Century Fund, a political action committee (PAC) without any campaign history that funded campaign material on behalf of Pappageorge.

Pappageorge won the August Republican primary 58.5% to Taub's 41.5%.

Shelley Goodman Taub was re-elected as Oakland County Commissioner in 2008, winning back her old seat.
