= John Jamian =

American businessman and politician

John E. Jamian is an American businessman, former U.S. Government official, and Michigan State Legislator. He served as deputy and later acting maritime administrator, the head of the U.S. Maritime Administration, an agency of the United States Department of Transportation, from 2003 until 2006. Prior to his service at the Maritime Administration, Jamian was elected to three terms in the Michigan House of Representatives from 1991 to 1996. From 1997 to 2001 he served as executive director of the Detroit/Wayne County Port Authority. Between 2011 and 2015, Jamian resumed his role as executive director at the Port of Detroit.

== Michigan House of Representatives ==
Jamian entered politics in 1990 when he ran as a Republican candidate for state representative in Michigan's 40th District. After winning a tightly contested primary and subsequent general election, he was sworn into office in 1991. Jamian served three terms in the state house, stepping down after 1996 to honor his commitment to term limits.

As a state representative, he chaired the House Health Policy Committee and the House Committee on Port and Maritime Affairs. He also served as vice chair of the House Insurance Committee and co-chaired the United States Canada Relations Committee for the Midwest Council of State Governments.

== Detroit / Wayne County Port Authority ==
In 1997, Jamian was appointed by Governor John Engler to serve as executive director of the Detroit/Wayne County Port Authority. During his time at the Port of Detroit, he led the effort to secure a $6.2 Million state grant as part of the Clean Michigan Initiative. The grant money was used to redevelop portions of the Detroit waterfront, including the construction of the Detroit Riverfront Promenade.

In 2000, Mayor Dennis Archer appointed Jamian to the Detroit 300 Commission as chairman of the "Sail Detroit" Planning Committee. As chair he was responsible for the planning and organization of a Tall Ships parade, one of the highlight events at Detroit's tricentennial celebration in 2001.

Jamian was reappointed to a second term as Executive Director of the Port of Detroit between 2011 and 2015.

== U.S. Maritime Administration ==
In 2003, Jamian was nominated by President George W. Bush to serve as the deputy maritime administrator for the U.S. Department of Transportation's Maritime Administration. He was confirmed by the U.S. Senate and assumed his duties on May 7, 2003. With the resignation of William Schubert on February 12, 2005 Jamian was named Acting Maritime Administrator.

As acting administrator, his responsibilities included oversight of marine transportation policy and port infrastructure programs, working with U.S. Transportation Command on the Marine Security Program, as well as serving as a member of the President's National Presidential Security Directive. Administratively, Jamian oversaw the daily operations of the Maritime Administration, its 900 employees, 276 ship assets under MARAD purveyance, and the United States Merchant Marine Academy at Kings Point, NY.

While serving as Deputy and Acting Maritime Administrator, John Jamian led the reorganization of MARAD's regional organizations into a national network of Gateway Offices at key U.S. ports. He worked with the Secretary of Transportation to establish the first USDOT Gateway Office on the West Coast and subsequently expanded the Gateway Office concept to other major U.S. regions, creating a more coordinated federal presence connecting MARAD and USDOT with state, local and port stakeholders.(https://www.maritime.dot.gov/sites/marad.dot.gov/files/docs/outreach/history/historical-documents-and-resources/7771/maradannualreport2004.pdf)(https://www.maritime.dot.gov/sites/marad.dot.gov/files/docs/foia/3991/maradannualreport2007.pdf) Also under his leadership, the agency played a pivotal role in rebuilding critical port infrastructure along the Gulf Coast after the devastating impacts of Hurricanes Katrina and Rita. Other lasting hallmarks include agency initiatives to build stronger maritime relationships with China and Vietnam and efforts toward the creation of a coastal shipping program between the United States, Canada and Mexico.

Jamian resigned his post as Acting Maritime Administrator on May 1, 2006.

Michigan House of Representatives
Preceded by Mike Bouchard	Member of the Michigan House of Representatives from the 65th district 1991–1993	Succeeded by Philip E. Hoffman
Preceded by Tim Walberg	Member of the Michigan House of Representatives from the 40th district 1993–1997	Succeeded by Patricia Godchaux
