= Mike McCready (politician) =

American politician

Member of the Michigan House of Representatives from the 40th district
- In office January 1, 2013 – January 3, 2019
- Preceded by: Chuck Moss
- Succeeded by: Mari Manoogian

Personal details
- Born: August 8, 1960 (age 65) Royal Oak, Michigan, U.S.
- Party: Republican

Mike McCready (born August 8, 1960) is a former member of the Michigan House of Representatives whose district covers Birmingham, Michigan, Bloomfield Hills, Michigan, Bloomfield Township Michigan and part of West Bloomfield Township.

McCready graduated from Seaholm High School, which is in the district boundaries. He has a bachelor's degree from Western Michigan University. Before being elected to the state house in 2012 he was a member of the Bloomfield Hills City Commission.
