= St. Sarkis Church (Dearborn, Michigan) =

Church building in Detroit, USA

Coordinates: 42.32994°N 83.22744°W

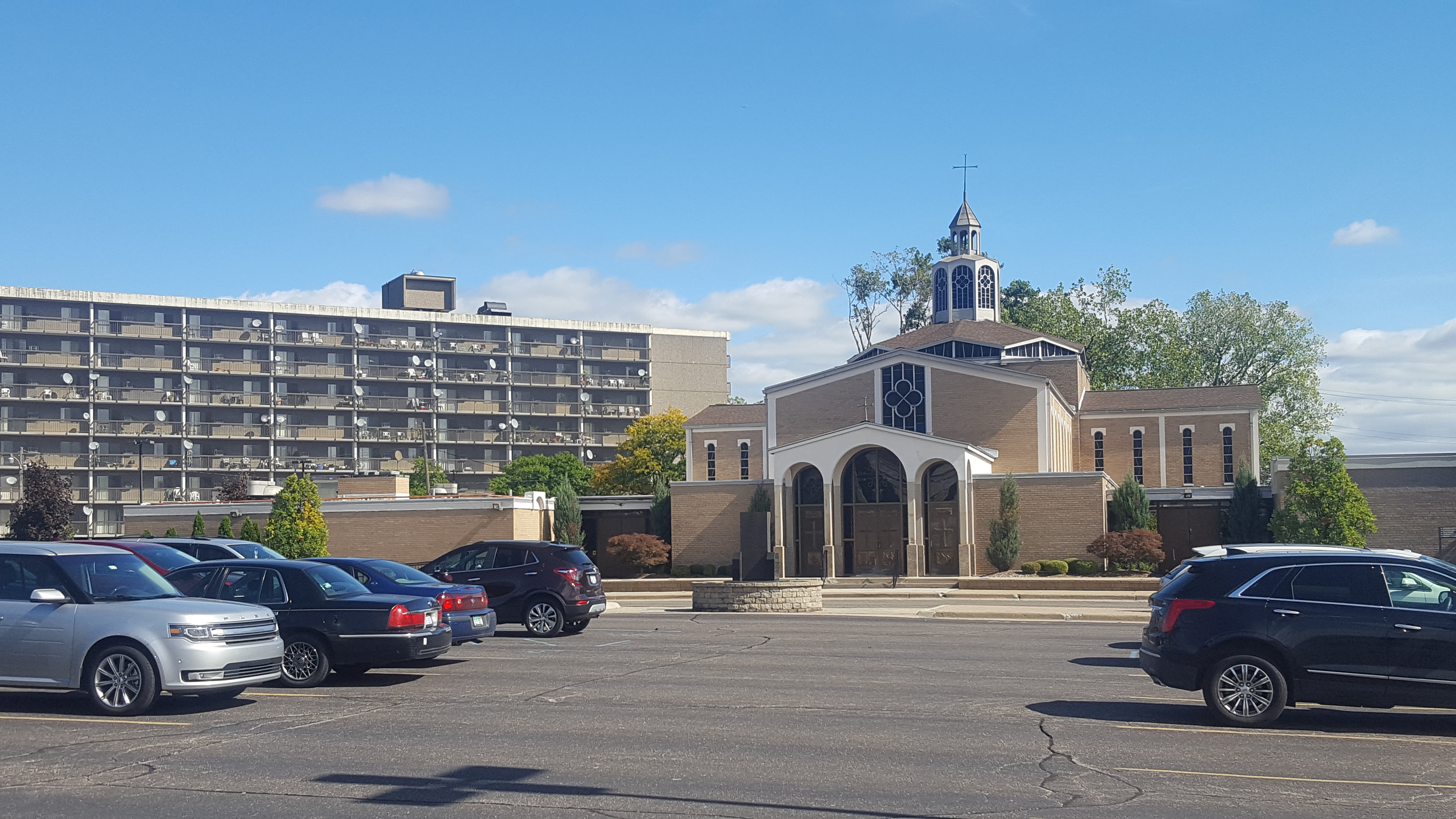
St. Sarkis Church and Armenian Senior Citizens Towers

St. Sarkis Armenian Apostolic Church was established on May 24, 1942 on Waterman Street in Detroit, MI, US. The current location in Dearborn, MI was dedicated on October 14, 1962; it serves the Armenians in Eastern Michigan, and is one of the Churches of the Prelacy of the Armenian Apostolic Church of America under jurisdiction of the Holy See of Cilicia. The congregation supports the Armenian Senior Citizen Tower, also called St Sarkis Towers, a 151-unit low income/senior housing facility near the church.
