= Arab Community Center for Economic and Social Services =

Arab American human services organization

The Arab Community Center for Economic and Social Services (ACCESS) is a human services organization committed to the development of the Arab American community. ACCESS helps low-income families, as well as newly arrived immigrants adapt to life in the United States. Its goal is to foster a greater understanding of Arab culture in the U.S. and in the Arab world. ACCESS provides social, mental health, educational, artistic, employment, legal, and medical services.

== History ==
ACCESS began operating out of a storefront at Dearborn’s South End in 1971. Staffed by volunteers, ACCESS’ first board president was George Khoury, accompanied by Hajjah Aliya Hassan as the first volunteer director.

Without the help of The Association of Arab-American University Graduates (AAUG), and its donation of the first months rent, the opening of ACCESS on Vernor Highway would not have been possible. In subsequent years, ACCESS moved to Hashemite Hall until it burned down. In 1973, the building on Saulino Court was purchased by the Yemeni Benevolent Association, and offered to ACCESS free of charge, where the administrative offices still reside today.

The expansion of ACCESS has grown to five locations, including the Arab American National Museum (AANM), which was founded on May 5, 2005.

== Social Services ==
With two walk-in offices in Dearborn and one outreach office in Hamtramck, Social Services continues to assist the community. Services include finding jobs, immigration needs, and health services.

=== Services ===
- Information and Referral — provides assistance with completion of forms from the Michigan Department of Human Services (welfare), Social Security Administration, Michigan Department of Labor and Economic Growth (unemployment offices), utility companies, and health systems.
- Advocacy - provides assistance with government and private entities.
- Translation of documents.
- Interpreter services.
- Emergency Services Program (rent/mortgage assistance and utility shut-off prevention, THAW, emergency food assistance)
- MI CAFE programs — Food Stamps Assistance Program targeting seniors
- Immigration Services - Family reunification, National Visa Center Processing, swear-in ceremonies and immigration services.
- Senior services.
- Legal assistance.

ACCESS partners with companies in Michigan to provide services.

=== Partnerships ===
- Department of Human Services (DHS).
- City of Dearborn.
- Social Security Administration.
- United Way for Southeastern Michigan.
- Wayne-Metropolitan Community Action Agency.
- Legal Aid and Defender Association (LADA).
- Senior Alliance.
- Detroit Area Agency on Aging (DAAA).

== Employment and training ==
The Employment and Training Department at ACCESS is a Certified Michigan Works One-Stop Employment Services Center. Each year the Employment and Training department holds six job fairs servicing 100 employers and drawing thousands of job seekers.

Key programs and services:

- Employment Service program.
- Workforce Investment Act – adult, DLW, youth and special populations programs.
- No Worker Left Behind program.
- Work First/JET programs.
- Workshops for job seekers.
- Self-Directed Resource Room with Internet access.
- Learning Lab – assessments, self-paced tutorials.

(basic skills, GED, ESL, office skills) And Computer Application training.

- Services to employers - recruitment, screening, consultations, mediation, job fairs.

== Youth and education ==
The Youth and Education Department provides learning and activities for youth of all ages. Summer programs include a stronger academic preparedness component. Each year through an Adult Literacy program ACCESS provides hundreds of predominantly non-native English speakers with courses in English as a Second Language (ESL).

Educational and recreational services are offered through the following programs:

=== Academic enrichment programs ===
- 21st Century Community Learning Centers (Lowrey Middle School and Salina Intermediate).
- After-school homework assistance.
- Targeted Intervention program.
- Summer Academy - academic, enrichment, and recreational all-day program.
- Supplemental Education Services - offered to schools that qualify.
- Vendor services (fee-based): Arabic, Spanish, Sports, Character Development, ESL.

=== Family Literacy Program ===
- Adult literacy (ESL).
- Interactive parent and child activities.
- Home visits and focused case management.
- Parenting education.
- Citizenship classes - in preparation for U.S. Citizenship Test.

== Other services ==
- Customized ESL training for employers.
- Teen dialogue group - in partnership with the University of Michigan.
- Interagency and community-wide referrals.
- Educational and advocacy services.
- Volunteerism/professional development opportunities.

== National Outreach ==
The National Outreach Department houses the National Network for Arab-American Communities (NNAAC), which is a network of independent Arab-American community-based organizations. Launched in 2004, the network has 16 members in nine states. The network has two annual events and four standing programs: Advocacy; the Arab-American Resource Corps; the Center for Arab-American Philanthropy.

=== Advocacy ===
The network's advocacy program focuses on immigration policy, civil rights and civil liberties, civic engagement and increased funding and support for human services.

=== Arab-American Resource Corps ===
The Arab-American Resource Corps (ARC), a national AmeriCorps program, engages individuals in service in Arab-American communities. AmeriCorps is a federally funded national service program in which individuals commit to one year of service in their communities.

=== Center for Arab-American Philanthropy ===
The Center for Arab-American Philanthropy promotes philanthropy. The program strives to support Arab-American giving, whether specifically to Arab-American community organizations or other issues of concern to Arab-American donors.

=== Organizational Development ===
The Organizational Development program supports the sustainability and growth of Arab-American community-based organizations. By providing technical assistance to strengthen organizations, the network ensures their long-term sustainability.

=== National Arab-American Service Day ===
National Arab-American Service Day is an annual community service project spearheaded by the Arab-American Resource Corp which takes place in 15 cities throughout the country. Its mission is to encourage volunteerism and service among communities; to connect people through the common experience of service; and highlight Arab-Americans’ commitment to serving their communities.

=== Annual Conference ===
The Annual Conference provides a forum where NNAAC member organizations meet and work with experts, advocates from partner coalitions, the funding community and Arab-American leaders. The conference brings together a group of participants in order to discuss issues facing local communities.
