= Christine Morse =

American politician (born 1973)

Member of the Michigan House of Representatives
- In office January 1, 2021 – December 31, 2024
- Preceded by: Brandt Iden
- Succeeded by: Matthew Longjohn
- Constituency: 61st district (2021–2022); 40th district (2023–2024)

Personal details
- Born: 1973 (age 52–53) Tecumseh, Michigan
- Party: Democratic
- Children: 3
- Education: Michigan State University; Wayne State University Law School
- Website: Vote 4 Morse

Christine Morse (born 1973) is an American Democratic politician from Michigan and is the judge of Kalamazoo County's 9th circuit court. She was elected to the Michigan House of Representatives from the 61st district in 2020. She was then elected to represent the 40th district in 2022. in 2024 she decided not to run for reelection and instead ran for the newly created 9th circuit court of Kalamazoo County. she would then defeat her opponent Mariko Willis 62% to 36.7%.

== Early life and education ==
Morse was born in Tecumseh, Michigan in 1973. Morse earned a bachelor's degree from Michigan State University and then a J.D. degree from Wayne State University Law School.

== Career ==
Morse worked as an attorney from 1999 to 2002. Morse has served as the Kalamazoo County Commissioner representing the 9th district since 2018. In her campaign for the Michigan House of Representatives seat representing the 61st district, Morse was endorsed by former United States President Barack Obama. Morse is the first Democrat to win the 61st district since it was re-established as a Kalamazoo County seat in 1993. Morse was sworn in as state representative on December 11, 2020 and assumed office on January 1, 2021.

In the 2022 Michigan House of Representatives election, she was elected in District 40 due to redistricting.

In 2024, Morse decided not to run for reelection and instead ran for the newly created 9th circuit court of Kalamazoo County. She would then defeat her opponent Mariko Willis 62% to 36.7%. She was succeeded in the state House by Matthew Longjohn.

== Personal life ==
Morse is married and has three children. Morse is a cancer survivor.
