= Dickson (surname) =

Dickson or, as is common in England, Dixon, is a patronymic surname, traditionally Scottish and thought to have originated upon the birth of the son of Richard Keith, son of Hervey de Keith, Earl Marischal of Scotland, and Margaret, daughter of the 3rd Lord of Douglas.

== History ==
"Nisbet in his Heraldry (Edinburgh 1722) says 'The Dicksons are descendants from Richard Keith, said to be a son of the family of Keith, Earls Marischals of Scotland' and in proof thereof carry the chief of Keith Marischal. This Richard was commonly called Dick and the 'son' was styled after him. The affix of son in the Lowlands answering the prefix Mac in the Highlands." As a result, Clan Dickson is considered a sept of Clan Keith. Richard Keith's son, Thomas, took the surname "Dickson" (in the earliest record spelled Dicson), meaning "Dick's son" or "Richard's son".

Although long recognised as a Sept of Clan Keith through Thomas Dickson's paternal line, in July 2012 the Clan Douglas Society of North America also recognised the Dickson/Dixon name as a Sept and Allied Family to Clan Douglas. This recognition resulted from the direct connection through Thomas Dickson's mother, Margaret, daughter of William, the 3rd Lord Douglas and also Thomas' faithfulness to the Douglas Clan, notably to his second cousin William, 7th Lord Douglas and William's son the good Sir James, 8th Lord Douglas.

Thomas Dickson (1247–1307) himself has quite a history. He was associated in some way with William Wallace, and was killed by the English in 1307 in battle. Tradition states he was slashed across the abdomen but continued fight holding the abdominal wound closed with one hand until he finally dropped dead. He is buried in the churchyard of St Brides, Douglas, and his marker shows him with a sword in one hand holding his belly with the other. Robert the Bruce made him Castellan of Castle Douglas the year before he was killed.

The Dicksons/Dixons (and 30 other derivates) family name was first found in Scotland whilst the Dixons in England who are of Scottish descent from Thomas Dickson living in 1268 are of the same origin as the Scottish Dicksons. Early records show Thomas Dicson, a follower of the Douglas clan, at the re-capture of Douglas Castle in 1307.

The Dickson's coat of arms show the Keith "pallets gules" and the Douglas "mullets argent", this is to show their descent from these two ancient Scottish noble families. The family mottoes include "Fortes fortuna juvat", "Coelum versus", for Dickson: translated as "Fortune favours the brave", Heavenward"; whilst "Quod dixi dixi" Dixon, is translated as "What I have said I have said".

== A ==
- A. King Dickson (1876–1938), American football coach, lawyer, and banker
- Aaron Dickson (born 1980), Northern Irish artist
- Adrian Dickson (born 1977), British television personality
- Alec Dickson (1914–1994), British activist
- Alex D. Dickson (1926–2021), American Anglican bishop
- Alex Dickson (boxer) (born 1962), Scottish boxer
- Alexander Dickson (British Army officer) (1777–1840), British Army officer
- Alexander Dickson (botanist) (1836–1887), Scottish botanist
- Alexander George Dickson (1834–1889), British politician
- Amanda America Dickson (1849–1893), American slave and socialite
- Amy Dickson (born 1982), Australian classical saxophone player
- Andrew Dickson (born 1945), English music composer
- Andrew Flinn Dickson (1825–1879), American minister and author
- Angela Dickson (born 1944), Welsh international badminton player
- Anne Dickson (born 1928), Northern Irish politician
- Anthony Hampden Dickson (1935–2022), Jamaican clergyman and bishop
- Antonia Dickson (1850–1950), British writer, lecturer, concert pianist
- Archibald Dickson (c.1739–1803), Royal Navy admiral
- Archibald Dickson (sea captain) (1892–1939), Welsh sea captain
- Athol Dickson (born 1955), American writer and architect

== B ==
- Barbara Dickson (born 1947), Scottish singer and actress
- Barry Dickson (born 1962), Australian neurobiologist
- Beatrice Dickson (1852–1941), Swedish philanthropist
- Benjamin Abbott Dickson (1897–1976), United States Army colonel
- Bertram Dickson (1873–1913), Scottish airman
- Billy Dickson (footballer) (born 1945), Scottish footballer
- Billy Dickson, American cinematographer and television director
- Bob Dickson (born 1944), American professional golfer
- Bob Dickson (ice hockey) (born 1947), Canadian ice hockey player
- Bobby Dickson (born 1955), Scottish footballer
- Brandon Dickson (born 1984), American baseball player
- Brenda Dickson (born 1949), American actress
- Brent Dickson (born 1941), American judge
- Brian Dickson (1916–1998), Chief Justice of Canada from 1984 to 1990
- Brice Dickson, Irish legal academic
- Bruce Dickson (ice hockey) (1931–2023), Canadian ice hockey player
- Bruce Dickson (rower) (1932–2006), Australian rower
- Byron W. Dickson (1875–1930), American football player and sports coach

== C ==
- Camilla Dickson (1932–1998), English archaeobotanist
- Campbell Dickson (1903–1958), American football player and coach
- Camryn Dickson (born 2004), American athlete
- Carla Dickson (born 1976), Brazilian politician
- Charles de Graft Dickson (1913–1997), Ghanaian educationist and politician
- Charles Dickson (merchant) (1746–1796), Canadian politician
- Charles Dickson (soldier), Canadian politician
- Charles Dickson, Lord Dickson (1850–1922), British politician
- Charles Gordon Campbell Dickson (1907–1991), Soft redirect to Wikispecies
- Charles Rea Dickson (1858–1938), Advocate for the blind, co-founder of CNIB
- Charles Wedderburn Dickson (1863–1934), British-born politician
- Charlie Dickson (1934–2013), Scottish footballer
- Chris Dickson (footballer) (born 1984), British-born Ghanaian footballer
- Chris Dickson (sailor) (born 1961), New Zealand sailor
- Christine E. Dickson (born 2000), American cognitive psychologist
- Collingwood Dickson (1817–1904), British military officer, VC recipient
- Curtis Dickson (born 1988), Canadian lacrosse player

== D ==
- Dale Dickson (born 1962), Australian rules footballer
- Dave Dickson (born 1959), US international rugby union player
- David C. Dickson (Mississippi politician) (1794–1836), American politician
- David Catchings Dickson (1818–1880), American politician
- David Dickson (swimmer) (born 1941), Australian freestyle swimmer
- David Dickson (minister) (1583–1662), Scottish theologian and minister
- David Dickson (surgeon) (1780–1850), Scottish naval surgeon
- David Dickson (rugby union) (1900–1978), New Zealand international rugby union player
- David Dickson (footballer) (born 1952), Australian rules footballer
- Dawn Dickson (born 1979), American businesswoman
- Des Dickson (Australian footballer) (born 1941), Australian rules footballer
- Des Dickson (footballer, born 1948), Northern Irish footballer
- Dorothy Dickson (1893–1995), American actress
- Doug Dickson (1894–1960), Australian politician

== E ==
- Earle Dickson (1892–1961), American engineer
- Ed Dickson (born 1987), American football player
- Edward Augustus Dickson (1879–1956), American educator
- Edward Dickson (Canadian politician) (1854–1903), Canadian politician
- Edward M. Dickson (1912–2000), Massachusetts politician
- Edward Stirling Dickson (1765–1844), British naval officer
- Edward Thompson Dickson (1850–1938), British Army general
- Elias Evander Dickson (1832–1909), American politician
- Elizabeth Dickson (1793–1862), British anti-Barbary slaves activist
- Elizabeth Dickson (bowls) (died 2022), Scottish lawn bowler
- Ellen Dickson (1819–1878), English ballad composer
- Emily Dickson (born 1997), Canadian biathlete
- Emily Winifred Dickson (1866–1944), Irish doctor, first female Fellow of a Royal College of Surgery
- Emma Lucy Dickson (1854–1926), Canadian author
- Euan Dickson (1892–1980), New Zealand WW1 bomber pilot
- Eva Dickson (1905–1938), Swedish explorer
- Evangeline Dickson (1922–2004), British artist
- Evon Dickson (1934–2012), New Zealand cricketer

== F ==
- Fadda Dickson, Ghanaian media executive
- Frank Dickson (banker) (1931–2023), New Zealand banker
- Frank S. Dickson (1876–1953), American politician
- Fred Dickson (1937–2012), Canadian politician

== G ==
- Gary Dickson, Canadian politician
- George Dickson (1921–2020), American football player and coach
- George Dickson (cricketer), Australian cricketer
- Glenn Dickson (born 1986), New Zealand rugby union player
- Glenn Dickson (footballer) (born 1954), Australian rules footballer
- Gloria Dickson (1917–1945), American actress
- Gordon Dickson (athlete) (1932–2015), Canadian long-distance runner
- Gordon Dickson (rugby union) (born 1954), Scotland international rugby union player
- Gordon R. Dickson (1923–2001), American science fiction writer

== H ==
- H. R. P. Dickson (1881–1959), British colonial administrator
- Harlan Dickson (1914–1944), US Navy officer
- Harold Dickson (Missouri politician) (1906–1990), American politician
- Hedley V. Dickson (1858–1942), Canadian politician
- Henry Newton Dickson (1866–1922), British professor of geography
- Henry Seriake Dickson (born 1966), Nigerian politician
- Herbert Dickson, Scottish footballer
- Hilton A. Dickson Jr. (1924–1985), American politician
- Hislop Dickson (1933–2024), Scottish cyclist
- Hugh Dickson (footballer, born 1899) (1899–1981), Scottish footballer
- Hugh Dickson (footballer, born 1981), Northern Irish footballer
- Hughie Dickson (1895–1965), English footballer

== I ==
- Ian Dickson (TV personality) (born 1963), Australian television personality
- Ian Dickson (footballer) (1902–1976), Scottish footballer
- Isaac Dickson (1840–1919), American civic leader
- Itimi Dickson (born 1983), Singaporean footballer
- Ivey Dickson (1919–2014), English pianist, teacher and musical director

== J ==
- James Bell Dickson (1923–1944), US Army Air Force pilot in WW2
- James Dickson (Queensland politician) (1832–1901), Australian politician
- James Dickson (botanist) (1738–1822), Scottish nurseryman and naturalist
- James Dickson (merchant) (1784–1855), Scottish-Swedish merchant, industrialist, banker and philanthropist
- James Dickson (New Zealand politician) (1854–1937), New Zealand politician
- James Dickson (Irish politician) (1859–1941), Irish politician
- James Dickson (cricketer) (1887–1970), New Zealand cricketer
- James Dickson (New South Wales politician) (1813–1863), Australian politician
- James Dickson (priest) (died 1787), Irish Anglican priest
- James Dickson (Swedish politician) (1899–1980), Swedish politician, agronomist and chamberlain
- James Dickson (rugby union) (1897–1963), Rugby union player from Northern Ireland
- James Douglas Hamilton Dickson (1849–1931), Scottish mathematician and expert in electricity
- James Fredrik Dickson (1844–1898), Swedish merchant and stable master
- James G. Dickson (1891–1962), American mycologist
- James Hill Dickson (1863–1938), Northern Ireland unionist politician
- James Jameson Dickson (1815–1885), Scottish-Swedish logging industrialist and philanthropist
- James M. Dickson, American politician
- James Robertson Dickson (1810–1873), Swedish shipping and logging businessman
- James Samuel Dickson (1870–1939), New Zealand politician
- Jane Dickson (born 1952), American painter
- Jason Dickson (born 1973), Canadian-born baseball pitcher
- Jennifer Dickson (1936–2025), South African-born British-Canadian artist
- Jeremiah Dickson (c.1775–1848), British Army officer
- Jessica Dickson (born 1984), American basketball player
- Jim Dickson (politician) (born 1964), British politician
- Jim Dickson (producer) (1931–2011), American record producer
- Jim Dickson (baseball) (1938–2025), American baseball player
- Joan Dickson (1921–1994), Scottish cellist and cello teacher
- Joe Dickson (1940–2022), Canadian politician
- Joe Dickson (footballer) (1934–1990), English footballer
- John B. Dickson (born 1943), American LDS Church general authority
- John Dickson (author) (born 1967), Australian historian of religion
- John Dickson (civil servant) (1915–1994), Scottish civil servant and forester
- John Dickson (basketball) (born 1945), American basketball player
- John Dickson (footballer) (1949–1998), Scottish footballer
- John Dickson (minister), 17th-century minister from Rutherglen in Scotland
- John Dickson (New Zealand poet) (1944–2017), New Zealand poet
- John Dickson (New York politician) (1783–1852), American politician
- John Dickson (railway contractor) (1819–1892), British railway-construction company owner
- John Dickson (Australian politician), Australian politician
- John Dickson (American poet) (1916–2009), American poet and short story writer
- John Dickson (priest) (born 1746), Anglican priest in 18th century
- John F. Dickson (1821–1880), American public servant and law enforcement officer
- John Frederick Dickson (1835–1891), British colonial civil servant
- JoJo Dickson (born 1989), American football player
- Jonathan Dickson (born 2000), American actor
- Jonny Dickson (born 2001), British slalom canoeist
- Joseph Dickson (1745–1825), American politician
- Josh Dickson (born 1994), New Zealand rugby union player
- Julie Dickson (born 1955), Canadian civil servant

== K ==
- Kari Dickson (born 1966), British translator
- Karl Dickson (born 1982), English rugby union player
- Ken Dickson (1946–2013), Scottish and British wheelchair curler and Paralympian
- Kwesi Dickson (1929–2005), Ghanaian Christian theologian
- Kylie Dickson (born 1999), Belarusian artistic gymnast

== L ==
- Lance Dickson (born 1969), American baseball player
- Larry Dickson (born 1938), American racing driver
- Lauren Dickson (born 2000), Scottish cyclist
- Lawrence Dickson (1920–1944), Tuskegee Airman
- Lee Dickson (born 1985), England international rugby union player
- Leonard Eugene Dickson (1874–1954), American mathematician
- Lillian Dickson (1901–1983), American missionary
- Linda Dickson (born 1979), New Zealand sailor
- Lothian Sheffield Dickson (1806–1894), British Army officer and campaigner
- Lovat Dickson (1902–1987), Canadian publisher and writer

== M ==
- Maggie Dickson, Scottish 18th-century hanging survivor
- Marcus Dickson (born 1928), Sports shooter from Northern Ireland
- Margaret H. Dickson (born 1949), American politician
- Mark Dickson (tennis) (born 1959), American tennis player
- Mark Dickson (footballer) (born 1981), Irish footballer
- Mark Lee Dickson (born 1985), American pastor and anti-abortion advocate
- Martin B. Dickson (1924–1991), American historian
- Mary Bernard Dickson (c. 1811 – 1895), New Zealand nun
- Matiu Dickson (1952–2016), New Zealand Māori teacher, lawyer and academic
- Maurice Dickson (1882–1940), Scotland dual-international rugby union player & cricketer
- Menzies Dickson (1840–1891), American photographer
- Michael Dickson (hurdler) (born 1994), American sprinter
- Michael Dickson (educator) (born 1977), British-Israeli speaker
- Michael Dickson (American football) (born 1996), Australian-born American football player
- Michael Dickson (engineer) (1944–2018), British structural engineer
- Michael Dickson (skier) (born 1975), Australian alpine skier
- Moses Dickson (1824–1901), American abolitionist
- Moses Oruaze Dickson (born 1985), Lawyer and entrepreneur
- Muriel Dickson (1903–1990), Scottish soprano and actress
- Murry Dickson (1916–1989), American baseball player

== N ==
- Naomi Dickson (born 2000), British Jewish charity owner
- Neely Dickson (1877–1946), American theater impresario
- Neil Dickson (born 1951), English actor
- Ngila Dickson (born 1958), New Zealand costume designer
- Niall Dickson (born 1953), Journalist and health executive
- Nicolle Dickson (born 1969), Australian actress
- Noel Dickson (born 1933), Australian rules footballer
- Norm Dickson (1915–2004), Australian rules footballer

== O ==
- O'Koyea Dickson (born 1990), American baseball player
- Olle Dickson (1901–1995), Swedish swimmer
- Oscar Dickson (1823–1897), Swedish magnate, bulk merchant, industrialist and philanthropist

== P ==
- Paul Dickson (American football) (1937–2011), American football player
- Paul Dickson (writer) (born 1939), American journalist
- Pearl Dickson (1903–1977), American Memphis and country blues singer and songwriter
- Peter Dickson (announcer) (born 1957), Northern Irish voice-over artist
- Peter Dickson (historian) (1929–2021), British historian
- Peter Dickson (rower) (1945–2008), Australian rower
- Peter Dickson (footballer) (born 1951), Scottish footballer

== R ==
- Reecy Dickson (born 1944), American politician
- Richard Dickson (curler) (born 1979), Scottish male curler
- Richard Dickson (American football) (born 1987), American football player
- Richard Watson Dickson (1759–1824), British agriculturalist
- Rick Dickson (born 1954), College athletics director
- Rita Akosua Dickson (born 1970), Ghanaian chemist
- Rob Dickson (1963–2009), Australian rules footballer
- Robbie Dickson, British-Canadian engineer
- Robert Dickson (architect) (1926–2014), Australian architect
- Robert Dickson (writer) (1944–2007), Canadian poet, translator and academic
- Robert Dickson (sailor) (born 1998), Irish sailor
- Robert Dickson (fur trader) (1765–1823), Canadian fur trader
- Robert Dickson (Upper Canada politician) (1796–1846), Canadian lawyer and politician
- Robert Dickson (Nova Scotia politician) (1777–1835), Canadian farmer and politician
- Robert Dickson (physician) (1804–1875), Scottish physician and botanist
- Robert Temple Dickson III (1934–2006), American politician
- Robert Temple Dickson II (1909–1950), American politician
- Rodolfo Dickson (born 1997), Mexican Canadian alpine skier
- Roy Ward Dickson (1910–1978), Canadian television producer and host
- Ruby Dickson, American politician and economist
- Russell Dickson (footballer, born 1964), Australian rules footballer
- Russell Dickson (footballer, born 1961), Australian rules footballer
- Ryan Dickson (born 1986), English footballer

== S ==
- Sam Dickson (1887–1911), American race car mechanic
- Sam Dickson (rugby union) (born 1989), New Zealand rugby sevens player
- Samuel Auchmuty Dickson (1817–1870), Irish Conservative politician
- Samuel Dickson (Australian politician) (1866–1955), Australian politician
- Samuel Dickson (American politician) (1807–1858), American politician
- Samuel Dickson (died 1850) (1776–1850), Irish Peelite politician
- Samuel Henry Dickson (1798–1872), American poet
- Samuel J. Dickson (1867–1964), Canadian police chief
- Sarah E. Dickson (1880–1965), American Presbyterian elder
- Sean Dickson (born 1991), English-South African cricketer
- Simon Dickson (born 1982), British tennis player
- Sinclair Dickson (1885–1961), Australian rules footballer
- Stephen Dickson (executive) (born 1957), American aviator and government official
- Stephen Dickson (1951–1991), American baritone
- Steve Dickson (born 1962), Australian politician
- Stewart Dickson (born 1950), Northern Ireland politician
- Suran Dickson (born 1977), New Zealand LGBT activist
- Suzanne Dickson (born 1966), Swedish neurobiologist

== T ==
- Taylor Dickson (born 1992), American professional golfer
- Ted Dickson (1923–1996), British greyhound racing professional trainer
- Thomas Alexander Dickson (1833–1909), Irish politician
- Thomas Dickson (Nova Scotia politician) (1791–1855), Canadian politician
- Thomas Dickson (Scottish politician) (1885–1935), Scottish politician and journalist
- Thomas Dickson (sprinter) (born 1974), American sprinter
- Thomas Dickson (Upper Canada politician), Canadian politician
- Thomas Dickson (industrialist) (1822–1884), American businessman
- Thomas Dickson (antiquary) (1825–1904), Scottish antiquary
- Thomas Elder Dickson (1899–1978), Scottish artist
- Thomas Law Dickson, Nova Scotian politician
- Tom Dickson (figure skater) (born 1962), American figure skater
- Tom Dickson (Australian footballer) (1888–1958), Australian rules footballer
- Tom Dickson (Georgia politician) (born 1945), American politician
- Tommy Dickson (1929–2007), Northern Irish footballer
- Tory Dickson (born 1987), Australian rules footballer
- Tracy Campbell Dickson (1868–1936), United States Army general
- Tricia Dickson (born 1982), American voice actress

== U ==
- Ursula Jones Dickson (born 1968), American attorney and judge

== V ==
- Violet Dickson (1896–1991), English botanist, writer, and Orientalist

== W ==
- W. G. B. Dickson (fl. 1914), Ceylon Defence Force acting commander
- Walt Dickson (1878–1918), American baseball player
- Walter Brittain Dickson (1847–1916), Canadian politician
- Walter Dickson (author) (1916–1990), Swedish author
- Walter Hamilton Dickson (1806–1885), Canadian politician
- Walter Michael Dickson (1884–1915), Scotland international rugby union player
- Will Dickson (born 2004), English association football player
- William A. Dickson (1861–1940), American politician
- William Angus Dickson (1882–1967), Canadian politician
- William B. Dickson (1865–1942), American business executive
- William Dickson (RAF officer) (1898–1987), Marshal of the Royal Air Force
- William Dickson (footballer, born 1866) (1866–1910), Scottish footballer
- William Dickson (Falklands settler) (died 1833), Irish-born Falkland Islands settler
- William Dickson (footballer, born 1923), Northern Irish footballer
- William Dickson (Australian politician) (1893–1966), English-born Australian politician
- William Dickson (congressman) (1770–1816), American politician
- William Dickson (Upper Canada) (1769–1846), Canadian businessman, lawyer and politician
- William Dickson (bishop) (1745–1804), Anglican bishop in Ireland
- William Dickson (British Army officer) (1748–1815), Scottish army officer and politician
- William Dickson (Northern Ireland politician) (born 1947), Northern Irish unionist politician
- William Dickson (Nova Scotia politician) (c. 1779 – 1834), Canadian politician
- William Dickson (solicitor) (1799–1875), British solicitor and banker
- William Dickson (chemist) (1905–1992), Scottish chemist and educator
- William Kennedy Dickson (1860–1935), British-American inventor
- William Kirk Dickson (1860–1949), Scottish advocate and librarian
- William M. Dickson (1827–1889), American judge
- William Purdie Dickson (1823–1901), Scottish minister and theologian
- William Steel Dickson (1744–1824), Irish Presbyterian minister

== X ==
- Xzavier Dickson (born 1992), American football player

== Y ==
- Yohanna Dickson (1950–2015), Nigerian military governor

== See also ==
- Dickson (disambiguation)
- Dickson (given name)
- Dickson baronets
- Dickinson (name)
- Dixon (surname)
