= James Dickson =

James or Jim Dickson may refer to:

== Politics ==
- James Dickson (Scottish politician) (c. 1715–1771), MP for Lanark Burghs 1768–1771
- James Dickson (New South Wales politician) (1813–1863), member of the New South Wales Legislative Assembly
- James Dickson (Queensland politician) (1832–1901), Australian politician and 13th Premier of Queensland
- James Dickson (Irish politician) (1850–1941), Liberal MP for Dungannon 1880–1885
- James Dickson (New Zealand politician) (1854–1937), Reform Party member
- James Dickson (Swedish politician) (1899–1980), MP for The Right 1941–1968
- James Hill Dickson (1863–1938), Northern Ireland politician
- James M. Dickson, member of the Mississippi House of Representatives in 1872 and 1873
- James Samuel Dickson (1870–1939), New Zealand politician
- Jim Dickson (politician) (born 1964), English politician

== Sport ==
- James Sinclair Dickson (1885–1961), Australian rules footballer
- James Dickson (cricketer) (1887–1970), New Zealand cricketer
- James Dickson (rugby union), Irish international rugby union player
- Jim Dickson (baseball) (1938–2025), pitcher for the Houston Colt .45s, Cincinnati Reds, and Kansas City Athletics

== Others ==
- James Dickson (botanist) (1738–1822), Scottish botanist
- James Dickson (merchant) (1784–1855), Scottish merchant and philanthropist in Gothenburg, Sweden
- James Dickson (priest), Irish Anglican priest
- James Bell Dickson (1923–1944), pilot in the U.S. Army Air Forces
- James G. Dickson (1891–1962), American mycologist
- James Jameson Dickson (1815–1885), Scottish Swedish logging industrialist and philanthropist
- James Robertson Dickson (1810–1873), Swedish shipping and logging businessman
- James Douglas Hamilton Dickson (1849–1931), Scottish mathematician and expert in electricity
- James Dickson, member of New Zealand pop group The Chills
- Jim Dickson (producer) (1931–2011), American record producer
- James Dickson, one of the people killed during the 1990 Aramoana massacre

== See also ==
- James Dickson Phillips Jr. (1922–2017), American judge
- James Dixon (disambiguation)
