= Senator Dickson =

Senator Dickson may refer to:

- David Catchings Dickson (1818–1880), Texas State Senate
- James Hill Dickson (1863–1938), Northern Irish Senate
- Joseph Dickson (1745–1825), North Carolina State Senate
- Margaret H. Dickson (born 1949), North Carolina State Senate
- Robert Temple Dickson III (1934–2006), Texas State Senate

== See also ==
- Senator Dixon (disambiguation)
