= Hugh Dickson =

Hugh Dickson may refer to:

- Hughie Dickson (1895–1965), English footballer
- Hugh Dickson (footballer, born 1899), Scottish amateur footballer
- Hugh Dickson (footballer, born 1981), Northern Irish footballer
- Hugh Dickson (actor) (1927–2018), English actor who appeared in the 1981 radio series The Lord of the Rings
