= Jared D. Warley =

American politician

Jared D. Warley was an American politician, A.M.E. minister, farmer, judge, and state legislator in South Carolina. He represented Clarendon County, South Carolina in the South Carolina House of Representatives from 1870 to 1874 and in the South Carolina Senate from 1874 to 1877 when he resigned after Democrats took control.

He was one of the incorporators of the Clarendon Land Joint Stock and Loan Association.

He was sworn in on November 22, 1870. Elias E. Dickson contested Warley's election in 1874. John Laurence Manning was elected to succeed him.
