= Nathaniel Alexander (bishop) =

Irish Anglican bishop (1760–1840)

The Rt Hon and Most Rev Nathaniel Alexander DD

Bishop of Clonfert and Kilmacduagh
- In office 1802–1804

Bishop of Killaloe and Kilfenora
- In office May 1804 – November 1804

Bishop of Down and Connor
- In office 1804–1823

Bishop of Meath
- In office 1823–1840

Personal details
- Spouse: Anne née Jackson

Nathaniel Alexander (1760 – 21 October 1840), was an Anglican bishop in Ireland during the first half of the 19th century.

He was born in 1760 and educated at Harrow and Emmanuel College, Cambridge. He was appointed Bishop of Clonfert and Kilmacduagh in 1802 and translated to Killaloe in 1804. Only six months later he became Bishop of Down and Connor. He was translated for a third time to Meath in 1823. A nephew of James Alexander, 1st Earl of Caledon; father of Robert Alexander, Archdeacon of Down from 1814 to 1828; and uncle of William Alexander, Archbishop of Armagh from 1896 to 1911, he died in post on 21 October 1840.

Church of Ireland titles
Preceded by George de la Poer Beresford	Bishop of Clonfert and Kilmacduagh; 1802–1804	Succeeded by Christopher Butson
Preceded by Charles Dalrymple Lyndsay	Bishop of Killaloe and Kilfenora; 1804 (May)–1804 (November)	Succeeded by Robert Ponsonby Tottenham Loftus
Preceded by William Dickson	Bishop of Down and Connor; 1804–1823	Succeeded by Richard Mant
Preceded by Thomas Lewis O'Beirne	Bishop of Meath; 1823–1840	Succeeded by Charles Dickenson
