= Richard Chandler Alexander Prior =

English physician & botanist (1809–1902)

Richard Chandler Alexander Prior (born Richard Chandler Alexander, 6 March 1809, Corsham, Wiltshire – 5 December 1902, Regent's Park, London) was an English physician, botanist, plant collector, author, translator, antiquarian, and landowner. His principal work is On the Popular Names of British Plants: Being an Explanation of the Origin and Meaning of the Names of Our Indigenous and Most Commonly Cultivated Species (1st edition, 1863; 3rd edition, 1879).

== Biography ==
In 1830, Richard Chandler Alexander began the study medicine in London at the Windmill Street School of Anatomy headed by Herbert Mayo and also attended Michael Faraday's lectures at the Royal Institution on Albemarle Street. In 1831, Alexander entered St George's Hospital, but he had typhus fever in the winter of 1831–1832. To escape the unhealthy air of London, he went to Belgium and then to Weimar, where he spent the summer of 1832. For the academic year 1832–1833 he studied medicine in Berlin and then in autumn 1833 resumed his medical study at St George's Hospital. During the academic year 1833–1834 he was greatly inspired by the botanical lectures of Dr. Robert Dickson (1804–1875). After some study at Edinburgh, Alexander qualified M.B. at the University of Oxford and in 1836 began to practise medicine in Bath, Somerset. However, a sewer problem near his residence in Bath caused severe illness in him and many of his neighbours. Consequently he moved to Chippenham, Wiltshire. He graduated in 1837 with the research degree M.D. Oxon. and became in 1840 F.R.C.P. In the spring of 1841, he abandoned medical practice altogether. He lived in Gratz, Austria for about three years — during that time he contributed two papers to the Botanical Society of Edinburgh and made an extensive collection of the plant species in the region of Styria. In 1844 he collected plants in Dalmatia, passed through France, and briefly visited England. In autumn 1844 he went to Italy. He spent the winter of 1844–1845 in Naples and visited Sicily in the spring of 1845. He spent about a year in Sicily collecting plants and becoming personally acquainted with Giovanni Gussone and other botanists who were investigating Sicily's flora. In April 1846 he voyaged to the Cape of Good Hope and then lived for 13 months in Cape Town. In 1847 he went to Georgetown and Uitenhage (where he encountered heavy rains in the spring of that year). He then travelled across the Karoo in an ox-waggon. He made large botanical collections (numbering about 7,000 specimens) and returned to England in 1848.

In April 1849 he voyaged to the United States and collected plants until November, when he sailed to Jamaica. There he collected several thousand botanical specimens in the Blue Mountains and climbed the Blue Mountain Peak. In the autumn of 1850 he briefly visited New York and Canada before returning to England in November of that year. On the 6th of May 1851 he became a Fellow of the Linnean Society of London. He established a home at Hammersmith, West London, where he lived until 1859, with occasional trips to the European continent, visiting Germany, France, Denmark, Norway, and Italy. From 1851 to the end of his life, his work was more literary than botanical.

On the 5th of March 1859, Richard Chandler Alexander assumed the name "Richard Chandler Alexander Prior", under the will of his maternal uncle Edward Prior. R. C. A. Prior became lord of the manor at Halse, Somerset and one of the four largest landowners in the immediate vicinity. In 1899 Prior wrote that for forty years he mostly spent the six warmer months of the year at Halse, where he often played croquet, and the six colder months of the year at York Terrace, London, where he worked on his literary pursuits.

During the last few years of his life, Prior suffered from a severe case of Parkinson's disease, but his mind remained active and he retained his sense of humour.

Dr. Prior bequeathed his herbarium to the Royal Botanic Gardens, Kew. His heir, Sir Prior Goldney, Bart., donated to Kew about 140 volumes from Dr. Prior's botanical library.

August Grisebach named the genus Prioria in honour of R. C. A. Prior.

== Selected publications ==
- Ancient Danish ballads, translated from the originals. Williams and Norgate. 1860. LCCN 17018201.
- On the Popular Names of British Plants: Being an Explanation of the Origin and Meaning of the Names of Our Indigenous and Most Commonly Cultivated Species. Williams & Norgate. 1863.
  - Prior, Richard Chandler Alexander (1870). 2nd edition.
  - Prior, Richard Chandler Alexander (1879). 3rd edition.
- Notes on Croquet: and Some Ancient Bat and Ball Games Related to It. Williams & Norgate. 1872.
