= Russell Dickson =

Russell Dickson is the name of:

- Russell Dickson (footballer, born 1964), former Australian rules footballer for Collingwood
- Russell Dickson (footballer, born 1961), former Australian rules footballer for Melbourne
- Russell Dickson (actor), see List of former Coronation Street characters
