= USS Harlan R. Dickson =

Allen M. Sumner-class destroyer

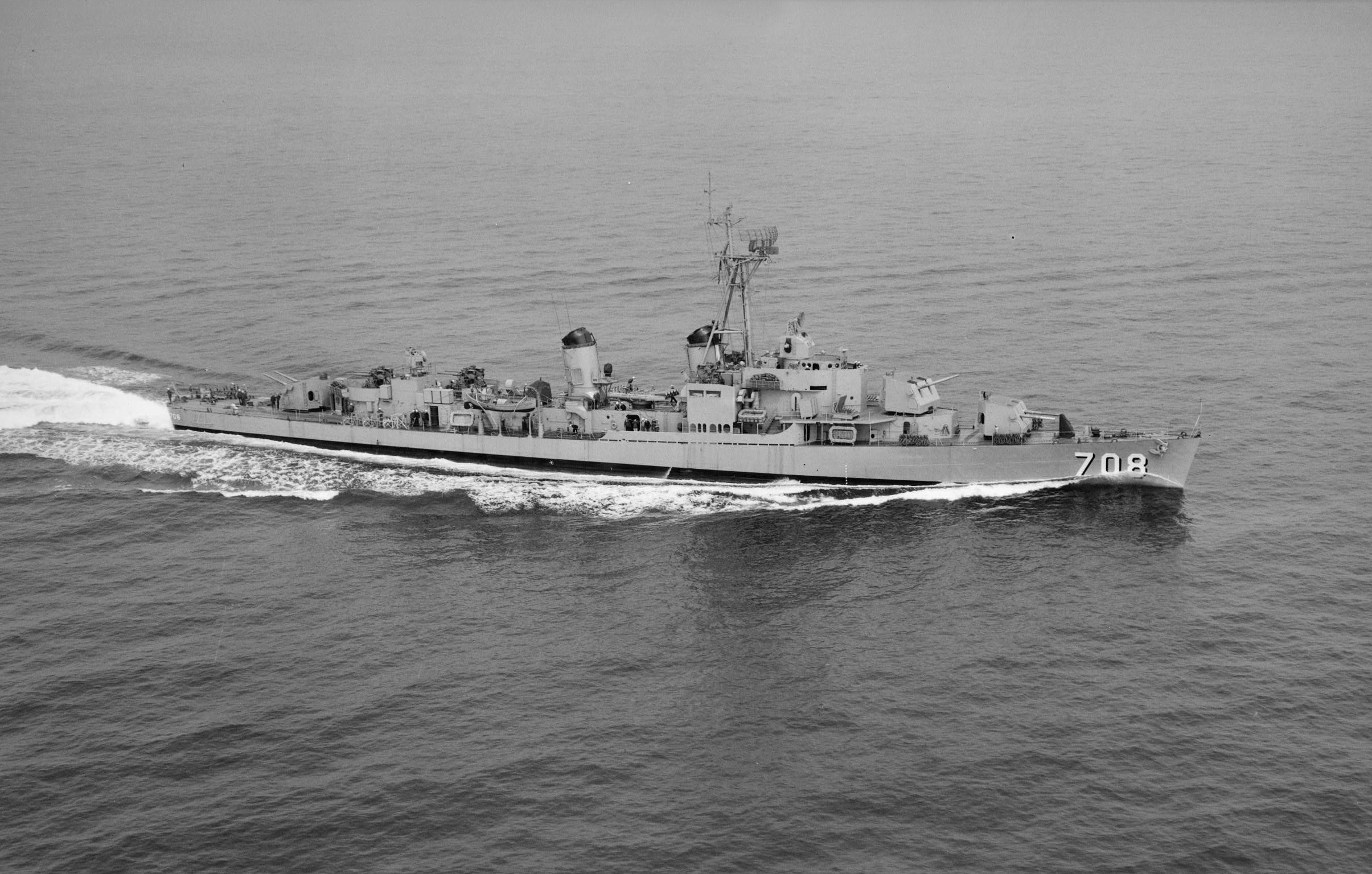
- USS Harlan R. Dickson (DD-708) underway in the early 1950s

History

United States
- Name: Harlan R. Dickson
- Namesake: Harlan Rockey Dickson
- Builder: Federal Shipbuilding and Dry Dock Company
- Laid down: 23 May 1944
- Launched: 17 December 1944
- Commissioned: 17 February 1945
- Decommissioned: c.1972
- Stricken: 1 July 1972
- Fate: Sold 18 May 1973 and broken up for scrap

General characteristics
- Class & type: Allen M. Sumner-class destroyer
- Displacement: 2,200 tons
- Length: 376 ft 6 in (114.76 m)
- Beam: 40 ft (12 m)
- Draft: 15 ft 8 in (4.78 m)
- Propulsion: 60,000 shp (45,000 kW); 2 propellers
- Speed: 34 knots (63 km/h; 39 mph)
- Range: 6,500 nmi (12,000 km; 7,500 mi) at 15 kn (28 km/h; 17 mph)
- Complement: 336
- Armament: 6 × 5 in (130 mm)/38 cal. guns, 12 × 40 mm AA guns, 11 × 20 mm AA guns, 10 × 21 inch (533 mm) torpedo tubes, 6 × depth charge projectors, 2 × depth charge tracks

USS Harlan R. Dickson (DD-708), an Allen M. Sumner-class destroyer, was named for Lieutenant Commander Harlan Rockey Dickson.

Harlan R. Dickson was launched on 17 December 1944 by the Federal Shipbuilding & Dry Dock Co., Kearny, New Jersey; sponsored by Mrs. Mildred Mae Studler, his mother. The ship was commissioned at New York on 17 February 1945.

== History ==
After shakedown in the Caribbean, Harlan R. Dickson departed New York for the Pacific 5 August 1945, but with the Japanese capitulation was ordered back to Solomons, Maryland, for experimental mine work. She finally joined her squadron at Pearl Harbor on 12 December and remained in the Pacific for tactical training until March 1946. Returning to the east coast, Harlan R. Dickson engaged in further training until sailing on 2 February 1947 for the first of what were to become regular cruises in the Mediterranean with the 6th Fleet. In addition to visiting many Mediterranean ports, the destroyer sailed into the Red Sea before returning to the United States on 14 August.

This year established a pattern which Harlan R. Dickson was seldom to break: six months of duty in the Mediterranean alternating with training and fleet maneuvers along the East Coast and in the Caribbean. During her second tour with the 6th Fleet, Harlan R. Dickson served under the United Nations blue-and-white flag December 1948-January 1949 during the attempt to mediate the Palestine crisis. In 1953 she participated in at sea training. On her sixth Mediterranean cruise, 2 July to 4 December 1956, Harlan R. Dickson played a role in evacuating American citizens from Haifa, Israel, as war threatened between Israel and Egypt. Her career entered still another phase September 1959 when she began service as a recovery ship on the Atlantic coast missile range to retrieve test capsules fired from Cape Canaveral, (now Cape Kennedy).

Harlan R. Dickson's e joined a hunter-killer antisubmarine unit in the quarantine of Cuba during the Cuban Missile Crisis.

Harlan R. Dickson joined Operation "Springboard" in the Caribbean, visiting San Juan and Santo Domingo before returning to Newport on 4 February 1963. On 7 March she commenced her 10th Mediterranean deployment with the 6th Fleet. While in the Persian Gulf, Harlan R. Dickson represented the United States in Khargex VI, an exercise designed for the improvement of working relationships with the Iranian and British navies. After a brief stop in the Mediterranean she returned to Newport in September. On 2 January 1964 Harlan R. Dickson entered the Boston Naval Shipyard for overhaul.

Harlan R. Dickson served in the 1st Naval District (headquartered at Boston, Massachusetts) as a United States Naval Reserve Training Ship. She provided Naval Reserve enlistees in their first year of service at the ranks of seaman, seaman apprentice, and seaman recruit with a two-week training cruise. The reserve cruises supplemented the "boot camp" training which was conducted at Great Lakes, Illinois. The ship's routine for the cruises was to leave Boston, with USS Compton and rendezvous with a submarine off the New England coast, perform anti-submarine warfare exercises, and proceed to Halifax, Nova Scotia, Canada, for a brief "liberty", where the Canadian Navy would host sailors in its enlisted club. During these cruises, enlistees were given the opportunity to experience shipboard life, including firing the weapon systems such as Hedgehog (weapon)|Hedgehog, depth charges, and 5-inch (127-millimeter) 38-caliber guns.

In March 1964, Harlan R. Dickson received her last active duty assignment, as one of two destroyers assigned to the Naval Destroyer School (now Surface Warfare Officers School Command) located at the U.S. Naval Base, Newport, Rhode Island. The other ship was USS Gainard. The two ships provided opportunities for students at the school to put into practice knowledge gained in the classroom during training exercises in Narragansett Bay and deployments to the Caribbean.

== Decommissioning and disposal ==
Harlan R. Dickson was stricken from the Navy Directory on 1 July 1972. She was sold for scrapping on 18 May 1973.
