= Ingel Fallstedt =

Swedish sculptor

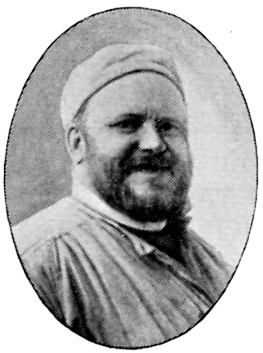
Ingel Fallstedt; from the Svenskt Porträttgalleri XX

Ingel Fallstedt (20 October 1848, Stockholm - 13 May 1899, Copenhagen) was a Swedish sculptor. He committed suicide before the unveiling of his statue honoring John Ericsson; his first major project.

== Biography ==
His father, Hampus Ludvig Fallstedt, was an official of the Riksbank. His mother, Maria Charlotta Wallander, was the sister of painter and art professor, Josef Wilhelm Wallander. After completing his primary education, in 1866, he began studying agriculture and entered the Ultuna lantbruksinstitut (Agricultural Institute) in 1867. He graduated two years later with a degree in agronomy. He worked keeping records at Lövstabruk, Stenhammar Castle and Margretelund, Åkersberga.

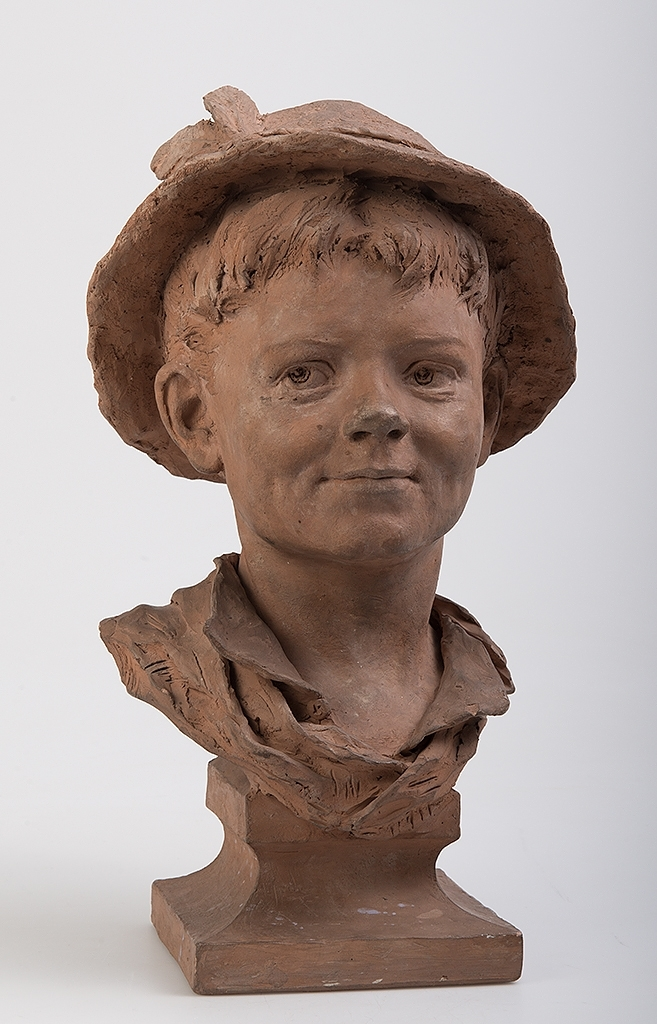
Fisherboy

He had shown an early interest in art, but it was a year after his father's death before he began formal studies, at the Royal Swedish Academy of Fine Arts (1872-1874). This was followed by studies in Munich and Paris; all funded by his inheritance. He also squandered much of it on amusements, but had enough remaining to establish a studio on the Rue de Tilsitt; although it was little more than a decorated shed. He had started sculpting during his time at the Academy, but it was in Paris that he established his impressionistic portrait bust style. In 1878, he participated in an exhibition at the Salon, but was not very successful.

Around 1880, he married the Swedish actress, Maria Lovisa Hammarstrand (1845-1929). The following year, he participated in another exhibition, in Sweden, at the "Nordiska konstutställningen i Göteborg 1881". This time, his busts received some positive critical attention and he received numerous orders; including one from King Oscar II.

Following that, he moved to Italy, where he spent several years in Florence, then relocated to Copenhagen. From 1883 to 1885, he received several orders from the Danish royal family. Around 1890, he moved to Gothenburg, where he continued to attract orders. One was for a bust of the merchant, James Fredrik Dickson, who became a major patron. He soon became an indispensable feature of the cultural life of Gothenburg; advocating for reforms in art education, the establishment of exhibitions, and financial support for struggling artists. In 1897, he was named a member of the Swedish Academy.

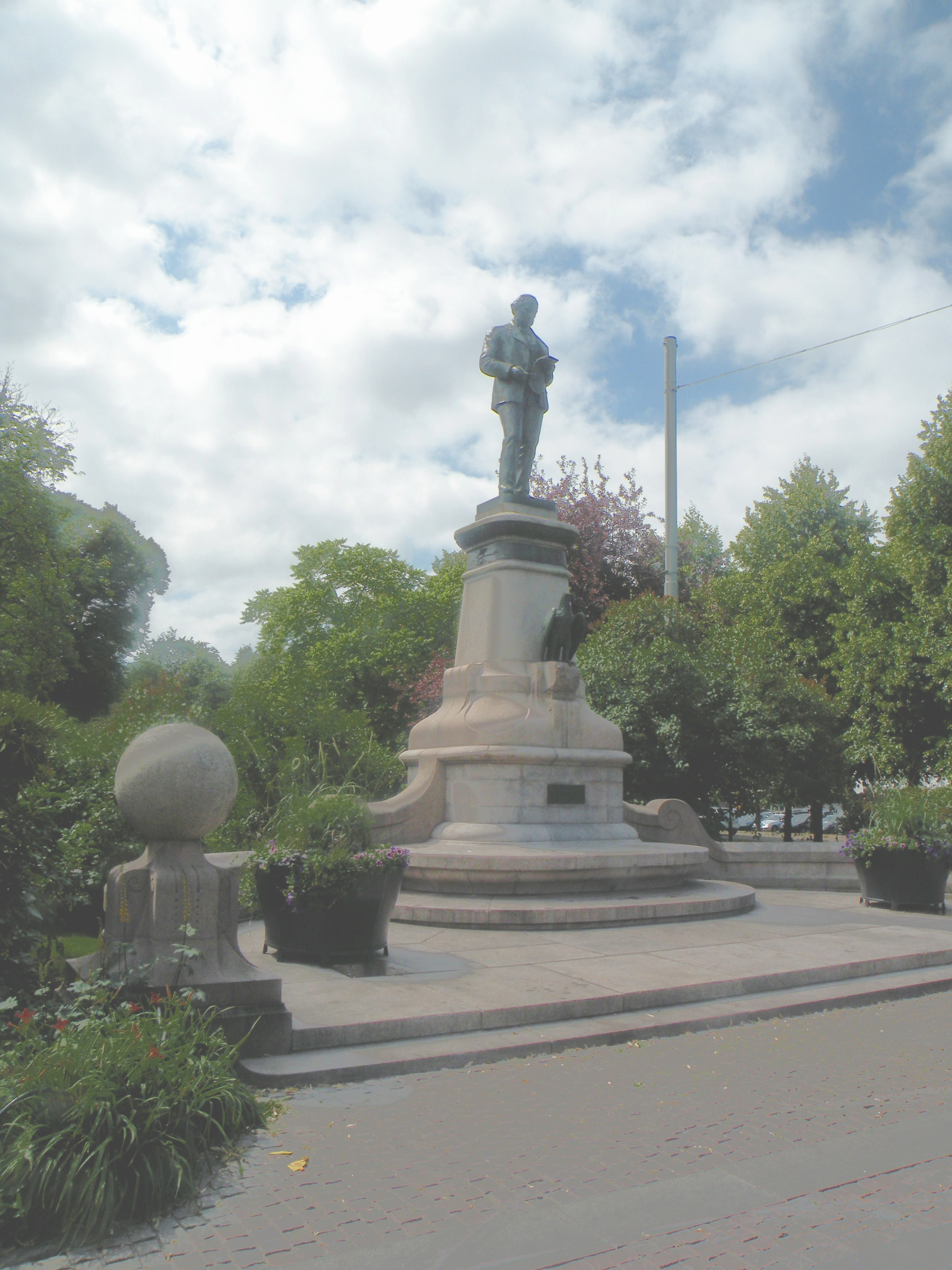
John Ericsson Monument, Gothenburg

His last sculpture, and only major work, was a statue of the inventor, John Ericsson, which he completed in 1899. Shortly after, he was admitted to the hospital at the University of Lund, where he was diagnosed with neurasthenia; most likely depression, resulting from extreme fatigue. After fourteen days at the clinic, he and Maria decided to take a vacation in Copenhagen. One early morning, he locked himself into a room. Later that day, he was found dead; hanging from a hook on a window post.

Work on the statue had been stressful. His initial design, a bust on a column, had been rejected in favor of a full figure. It was also to be cast in bronze; a medium that was unfamiliar to him. He worked it over several times, but was not satisfied with the results; becoming very agitated, then indifferent. In the opinion of his assistant, Ludvig Brandstrup, "it was the statue that killed him".
