= Senator Dixon =

Senator Dixon may refer to:

== Members of the Northern Irish Senate ==
- Sir Thomas Dixon, 2nd Baronet (1868–1950), Northern Irish Senator from 1924 to 1949

== Members of the United States Senate ==
- Alan J. Dixon (1927–2014), U.S. Senator from Illinois from 1981 to 1993
- Archibald Dixon (1802–1876), U.S. Senator from Kentucky from 1852 to 1855
- James Dixon (1814–1873), U.S. Senator from Connecticut from 1857 to 1869
- Joseph M. Dixon (1867–1934), U.S. Senator from Montana from 1907 to 1913
- Nathan F. Dixon I (1774–1842), U.S. Senator from Rhode Island from 1839 to 1842
- Nathan F. Dixon III (1847–1897), U.S. Senator from Rhode Island from 1889 to 1895

== United States state senate members ==
- Abram Dixon (1787–1875), New York Senate
- Bob Dixon (Missouri politician) (born 1969), Missouri State Senate
- Clint Dixon (born 1979), Georgia State Senate
- Jacob Dixon (1832–1899), Iowa State Senate
- Larry Dixon (politician) (1942–2020), Alabama State Senate
- Roscoe Dixon (1949–2021), Tennessee State Senate

== See also ==
- Senator Dickson (disambiguation)
