= Ellen Dickson =

English ballad composer (1819–1878)

Ellen (Elizabeth) Dickson (1819 – 4 July 1878), also known as Dolores, was an English ballad composer. She was born in Woolwich, England southeast of London. Ellen was the third daughter of General Sir Alexander Dickson. She had been physically disabled since a young age, and her chosen Latin pseudonym, Dolores, which means sorrows and bodily pains, reflects that aspect of her personal life. Ellen inherited her father's talents for mathematics and his analytical intellect.

She lived most of her life and died in Lyndhurst, England.

== Musical career ==
Dickson began making her reputation in the late 1850s, composing drawing-room ballads in a style similar to that of Maria Lindsay. She began by setting Longfellow poems in 1854. From then, Dickson published, partly under the name Dolores, a tremendous plethora of songs in renowned London music publishing companies. Approximately 65 songs have survived. These works include settings for poems by Henry Wadsworth Longfellow, Adelaide A. Procter, Percy Bysshe Shelly, Alfred Tennyson, and many others. Ellen Dickson achieved a high level of awareness with her song "The Bridge", lyrics by Longfellow, which was first published by Charles Jefferys in 1857.

== Known Compositions ==
Dickson's songs are often characterized by unusual permutations of broken chord patterns and delicate use of grace notes. Her setting of Tennyson's 'The Brook', published in 1857, shows individuality with its delicate use of grace notes to suggest the rippling water. Dolores also tends to rely on various permutations of broken-chord patterns for her accompaniments. In her case, they are often unpredictable in shape and rhythm. Her song "The Land of Long Ago" offers a good example.

She provides an example of the union of the beautiful melody and ornamental accompaniment in "Clear and Cool." When the words call for loudness, the pitch of the accompaniment ensures balance in the composition. The morally uplifting words of the song, taken from Charles Kingsley's "The Water Babies," are addressed to a mother and child.

Dolores released a songbook called "Dream" that contained her arrangements of Anne Proctors' works. The book was published in Philadelphia in 1867.

Dickson composed mainly parlor music, which, in historical context, was the main type of music socially acceptable for women composers. Her other works include:

- Good night, beloved (Text: Henry Wadsworth Longfellow)
- Old clock on the stairs (Text: Henry Wadsworth Longfellow)
- The bridge (Text: Henry Wadsworth Longfellow)
- The brook (Text: Lord Alfred Tennyson)
- The open window (Text: Henry Wadsworth Longfellow)
- Turn, fortune, turn (Text: Lord Alfred Tennyson)
- Vivien's song (Text: Lord Alfred Tennyson)
