= James Dixon (disambiguation) =

James Dixon (1814–1873) was a U.S. Representative from Connecticut.

James, Jamie, Jim or Jimmy Dixon may also refer to:

== Arts and entertainment ==
- James Budd Dixon (1900–1967), American painter and printmaker
- James Dixon (conductor) (1929–2007), American conductor
- Jim Dixon (fictional character) (fl. 1954), eponymous fictional character of Kingsley Amis' novel Lucky Jim

== Sports ==
- James Dixon (Lancashire cricketer) (fl. 1878), English cricketer
- Jim Dixon (American football) (1904–1966), American football player, wrestler and coach
- Jamie Dixon (born 1965), American college basketball coach
- James Dixon (American football) (born 1967), American football wide receiver
- Jimmy Dixon (born 1981), Liberian footballer

== Others ==
- James Dixon (priest) (1758–1840), Irish-Australian Catholic priest
- James Stedman Dixon (1845–1911), Scottish coal-mine owner
- James Main Dixon (1856–1933), American teacher and author
- James R. Dixon (1928–2015), American biologist
- Jimmy Dixon (politician) (born 1945), North Carolina House of Representatives member
- James Dixon (Police Officer) (died 2017), British Police Officer

== Other uses ==
- James S. Dixon Trophy in Canadian football

== See also ==
- James Dixon Murray (1887–1965), British coal miner and politician
- James Dixon Black (1849–1938), Kentucky governor
- James Dixon Roman (1809–1867), American politician
- James Dixon Williams (1877–1934), American film producer
- James Dickson (disambiguation)
