= James Fredrik Dickson =

Swedish merchant and stable master (1844–1898)

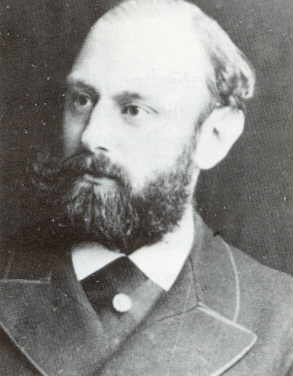
- Dickson
- Born: 1844; England
- Died: 1898 (aged 53–54); Gothenburg, Sweden
- Citizenship: German
- Occupations: Merchant; Wholesaler; Stable master; Businessman
- Known for: Stable master to Oscar II
- Father: James Jameson Dickson

James Fredrik Dickson (1844 – 1898) was a Swedish merchant, businessman, wholesaler, and stable master to Oscar II.

== Biography ==
James Fredrik Dickson was born in England in 1844, as the son of Eleonore Willerding, who came from an old clergyman's family in Hamburg, and James Jameson Dickson, founder of the Swedish shipping company James Dickson & Co in England, which employed the largest merchant fleet in Sweden with offices in both London and Gothenburg, where the family had settled in 1847.

Dickson married his cousin Blanche Dickson, with whom he had a daughter, Blanche Bonde (1875–1960), who was married to Carl Bonde for 24 years, from 1896 until 1920, thus becoming a member of the Swedish nobility. After buying the Tjolöholm Castle as their summer residence in 1892, Dickson and his wife decided to take down the manor house to make way for a new castle that would better suit their Anglophile tastes. Thus, in 1897, they set up a design competition for a castle in neo-Elizabethan style, and they ended selecting the runner-up Lars Israel Wahlman, aged 27. The following year, however, Dickson cut a finger and wrapped a foil from a bottle of wine around it to stop the bleeding, thus contracting blood poisoning, from which he died. Following his death, Blanche continued the castle's construction, which was finished in 1904, and following his wife's death in 1906, the Tjolöholm Castle was inherited by their daughter.

Professionally, Dickson was a merchant and the crown equerry to King Oscar II. He was also a wholesaler and stable master. Described as an "eccentric stable master", he commissioned a bust of himself to Ingel Fallstedt, who went on to became his personal friend.

== Bibliography ==
- Sumner, Anne (2001). Tjolöholms slott: Blanche Dickson - en kvinnlig byggherre [Tjolöholm Castle: Blanche Dickson - a female builder] (in Swedish). Gothenburg: Stiftelsen Tjolöholm. p. 143. ISBN 978-9-163110-70-2.
