= Jeremiah Dickson =

British Army officer (c.1775–1848)

Lieutenant-General Sir Jeremiah Dickson KCB
- Born: c. 1775
- Died: 17 March 1848
- Burial place: Mauchline, Scotland
- Military career
- Allegiance: United Kingdom
- Branch: British Army
- Service years: 1798–1848
- Rank: Lieutenant-General
- Commands: Lieutenant Governor of Nova Scotia
- Conflicts: French Revolutionary Wars; Napoleonic Wars; Hanover Expedition; Copenhagen Expedition; Siege of Stralsund; Walcheren Expedition; Peninsular War; Battle of Vitoria; Battle of the Pyrenees; Battle of Nivelle; Battle of Orthes; Battle of Toulouse

Lieutenant-General Sir Jeremiah Dickson KCB (c. 1775 – 17 March 1848) was a British Army officer and colonial official.

== Biography ==
He was the son of Right Reverend William Dickson, Bishop of Down. Dickson entered the army in 1798 joining the 8th Dragoons as a cornet and was promoted to lieutenant of the 2nd Dragoon Guards in 1799 and captain in 1803.

He became a major in the quartermaster's department in 1806 and in 1812, he was appointed assistant quartermaster general serving in Spain and Portugal during the Napoleonic Wars. For his services as assistant quartermaster general at the battles of Vitoria, the Pyrenees, Nivelle, Orthez and Toulouse he received a gold cross and one clasp. Dickson was also at the Battle of Waterloo and the capture of Paris. He was created a Knight Commander of the Order of the Bath in 1815. On 15 March 1818 he married Jemima, the youngest daughter of Thomas Brooke of Mere Hall in Cheshire. He continued as assistant quartermaster general in England and Ireland after the wars and was promoted colonel 27 May 1825.

Appointed quarter master general in India on 12 July 1827, Dickson was promoted to major general in 1837 and put in command of British forces in Nova Scotia. In 1844, he became colonel of the 61st Foot Regiment and in August 1846, he served as Acting Lieutenant-Governor of Nova Scotia. He returned to England, where he died on 17 March 1848 at Barskimming House, Mauchline, Ayrshire aged 73.

Military offices
Preceded by John Gardiner	Colonel of the 61st Regiment of Foot; 1844–1848	Succeeded by George Guy Carleton L'Estrange
Political offices
Preceded by The Viscount Falkland	Lieutenant Governor of Nova Scotia (acting); 1846	Succeeded by John Harvey
