= Emma Lucy Dickson =

Canadian author (1854–1926)

- Born: Emma Lucy Wells; 21 November 1854; Nova Scotia
- Died: 1926; Halifax, Nova Scotia
- Occupation: Novelist
- Spouse: William Dickson

Emma Lucy Dickson (née Wells; 1854–1926) was a Canadian writer who published one novel under the name Stanford Eleveth.

== Life ==
Born on 21 November 1854 in Nova Scotia (possibly Truro), she appears to have spent some of her childhood in Maine and Prince Edward Island. Having returned to Nova Scotia after receiving a common school education, in 1882 she married William Dickson, a pattern maker.

== Novel ==
In 1895, the Toronto publisher William Briggs released Miss Dexie, a Romance of the Provinces, attributed to Stanford Eleveth but in fact authored by Dickson. The novel was set in areas familiar to Dickson: Halifax, Maine, and Prince Edward Island, and tells the story of the imaginary Miss Dexie (short for Dexter). Gwendolyn Davies, writing in the Dictionary of Canadian Biography, notes similarities with Little Women including the strong-minded female protagonist's androgynous name, the timeframe, an abandoned romance, and the focus on familial support. Dickson incorporated recent developments, such as train travel and modern Victorian kitchens, and local details such as a vivid description of a McDonaldite worship service on Prince Edward Island.

The novel was well received, being reviewed in Toronto's Saturday Night, The Week, and Christian Guardian, the Portland Transcript, the Orillia Packet, and the Halifax Herald. The publisher produced three editions in the first year and continued to issue printings until 1907. Dickson may have also produced some children's books, but she never wrote another novel and largely disappeared from the literary scene after the 1890s.

== Deaths ==
Dickson had a daughter who died in childhood in 1897. Her husband died in 1923 and Dickson in 1926, in Halifax.
