= James Dickson (priest) =

Irish Anglican priest (died 1787)

James Dickson was an Irish Anglican Dean.

Dickson was born in England. He was Dean of Elphin from 1757 until 1768; and Dean of Down from 1768 unil his death in 1787.

His son was Bishop of Down and Connor from 1784 to until 1804.
