= Carla Dickson =

Brazilian politician (born 1976)

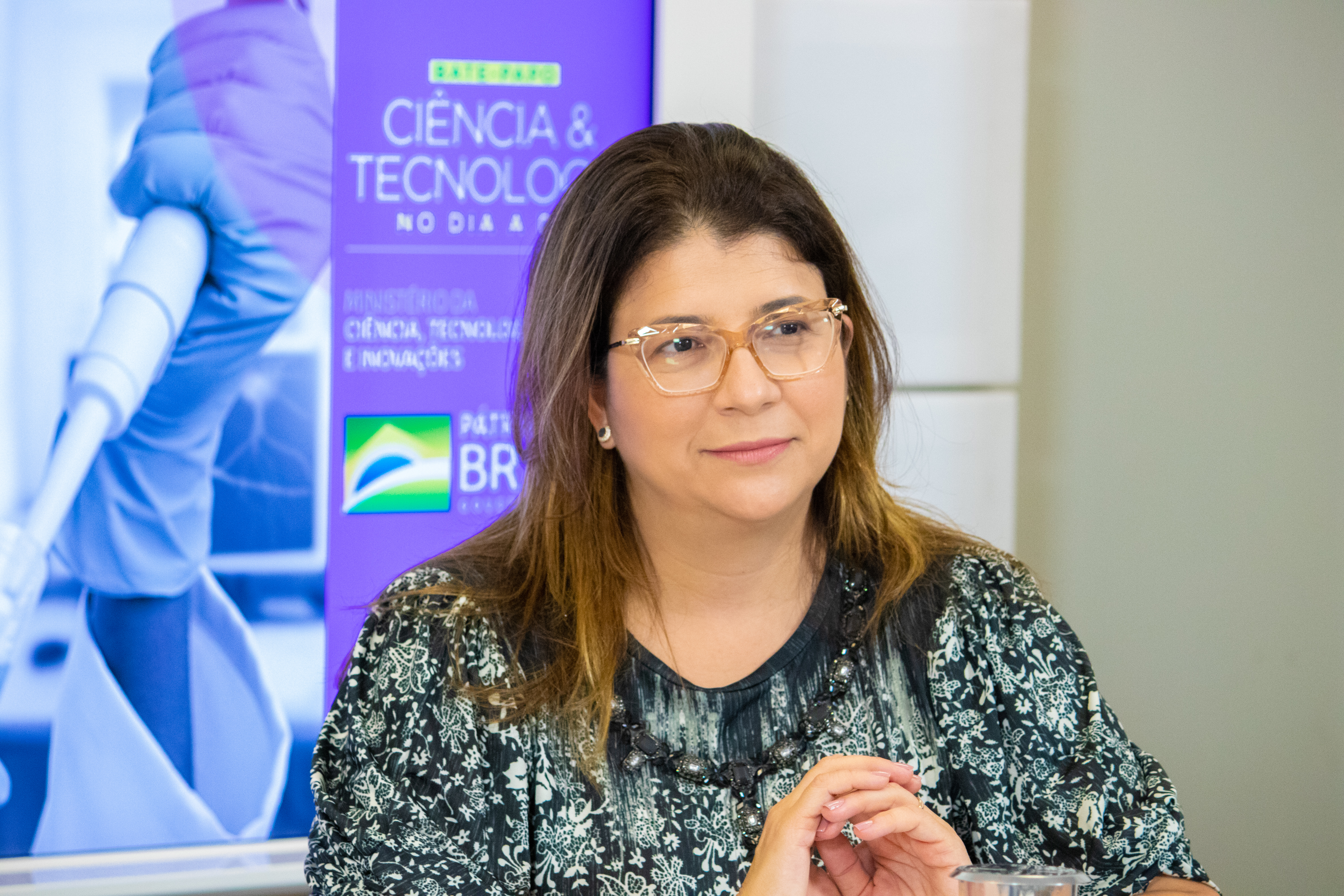
- Dickson in 2021

Member of the Chamber of Deputies
- Incumbent
- Assumed office 1 January 2025
- Preceded by: Paulinho Freire
- Constituency: Rio Grande do Norte
- In office 17 June 2020 – 22 December 2022
- Preceded by: Fábio Faria
- Succeeded by: Fábio Faria
- Constituency: Rio Grande do Norte

Personal details
- Born: 2 July 1976 (age 50)
- Party: PL (since 2026)
- Other political affiliations: Brazil Union (2022-2026)
- Spouse: Albert Dickson

Hilkéa Carla de Souza Medeiros Lima (born 2 July 1976), better known as Carla Dickson, is a Brazilian politician. She has been a member of the Chamber of Deputies since 2025, having previously served from 2020 to 2022. She is married to Albert Dickson.
