= John Dickson (priest) =

Anglican priest in 18th century

John Dickson (1746–1814) was an Anglican priest in Ireland during the 18th century.

Benson was educated at Trinity College, Dublin. He was Prebendary of Dunsfort in Down Cathedral from 1782 to 1796; and Archdeacon of Down from 1782 until his death.
