= Noel Dickson =

Australian rules footballer

Personal information
- Full name: Noel Dickson
- Born: 27 December 1933
- Original teams: Beulah, Red Cliffs
- Height: 189 cm (6 ft 2 in)
- Weight: 89 kg (196 lb)

Playing career^{1}
Years	Club	Games (Goals)
1956–57	Footscray	16 (12)
- ^{1} Playing statistics correct to the end of 1957.

Noel Dickson (born 27 December 1933) is a former Australian rules footballer who played with Footscray in the Victorian Football League (VFL).
