= Dale Dickson =

Australian rules footballer

Personal information
- Full name: Dale Dickson
- Born: 3 July 1962 (age 64)
- Original team: Shepparton
- Height: 180 cm (5 ft 11 in)
- Weight: 81 kg (179 lb)

Playing career^{1}
Years	Club	Games (Goals)
1982–1986	Melbourne	56 (20)
1987–1989	Brisbane Bears	30 (3)
Total		86 (23)
- ^{1} Playing statistics correct to the end of 1989.

Dale Dickson (born 3 July 1962) is a former Australian rules footballer who played with Melbourne and the Brisbane Bears in the Victorian Football League (VFL) during the 1980s.

He has been the chief executive officer of Australia's second largest local government, the city of Gold Coast, since July 2003. He is also a former chief executive officer of the Whitsunday Shire Council.

Dickson was replaced by Tim Baker, a former Tasmanian government departmental secretary as CEO in February 2022.
