= Robert Temple Dickson II =

American politician

Robert Temple Dickson II (12 September 1909 – 2 December 1950) was an American politician from Texas.

Robert Temple Dickson was born on 12 September 1909 and named after his father. He lived in Sweetwater, Texas. Dickson served in the Texas House of Representatives as a Democratic legislator for District 117 from 1939 to 1941. He resigned the seat during the first year of his second term in office to enlist in the United States Navy. After serving in World War II, Dickson returned to Texas, and by January 1945, had been named deputy county clerk in the probate court system of Tarrant County.

Dickson's son, Robert Temple Dickson III was also a state legislator.
