= George Dickson (cricketer) =

Australian cricketer

Personal information
- Full name: George Dickson
- Source: ESPNcricinfo, 26 December 2016

George Dickson was an Australian cricketer. He played two first-class matches for New South Wales between 1859/60 and 1871/72.

== See also ==
- List of New South Wales representative cricketers
