= Herbert Dickson =

Scottish footballer

Personal information
- Full name: Herbert Dickson
- Date of birth: 18 April 1909
- Place of birth: Macclesfield, England
- Date of death: 25 January 1977 (aged 67)
- Place of death: Glasgow, Scotland
- Position: Left back

Senior career*
Years	Team	Apps	(Gls)
1929–1930	East Stirlingshire	20	(2)
1930–1942	Queen's Park	218	(2)
- * Club domestic league appearances and goals

Herbert Dickson (18 April 1909 – 25 January 1977) was a Scottish amateur footballer who made over 210 appearances as a left back in the Scottish League for Queen's Park. He was described as "of powerful stature and kicks the ball accurately and confidently with either foot. His recovery powers too are first rate".

== Career ==
Dickson was born in Macclesfield, England to Glaswegian parents who returned to the Cathcart district of their hometown during his childhood. After beginning his career with East Stirlingshire, Dickson played for Scottish League Division One club Queen's Park between 1930 and 1942 and, including wartime competitions, he made 335 appearances and scored four goals for the club. He played in four minor finals with the Spiders – two in the Glasgow Cup and two in the Glasgow Merchants Charity Cup – but finished on the losing team on each occasion. Due to his background, under the rules of the era he was ineligible for selection by the Scotland national amateur football team, which was dominated by Queen's Park players. He was selected for two editions of the Glasgow Football Association's annual challenge match against Sheffield just prior to the outbreak of the Second World War.
