= William B. Dickson =

American business executive (1865–1942)

William Brown Dickson (November 6, 1865 – January 28, 1942) was an American business executive in the steel industry. Starting his career as a common laborer in the Homestead Steel Works of Carnegie Steel at the age of 15, he rose to become vice president of Carnegie Steel, U.S. Steel, and Midvale Steel. He was an outspoken advocate for the end of the seven-day week and the twelve-hour day in the steel industry and became a proponent of "industrial democracy" based on stock ownership by employees.

Dickson was one of the last of Andrew Carnegie's "young geniuses" to rise through the ranks to become a junior partner in Carnegie Steel, where he designed America's first corporate safety department and pension plan. When J.P. Morgan founded U.S. Steel in 1901, Dickson became assistant to the president of the new corporation and later first vice president.

William Dickson and Andrew Carnegie, photo courtesy of Littleton (NH) Area Historical Society

In 1915, he became vice president, treasurer, and director of Midvale Steel and Ordnance Company, which during World War I was the third largest steel company in the United States (after U.S. Steel and Bethlehem Steel). Dickson envisioned an equal partnership between labor and capital. Midvale Steel and Ordnance Company pioneered employee ownership and management and became one of America's most progressive industrial companies. Dickson retired in 1923 at age 58.

== Early life ==
William Brown Dickson was born in Pittsburgh, Pennsylvania, the ninth child of Mary Ann (née McConnell) and John Dickson (eventually there would be eleven). His mother was born in Lanarkshire, Scotland and had emigrated in 1850; his father was born in County Tyrone, Ireland and had emigrated in 1832.

When he was one, his family moved to Swissvale where his father was a partner in Dickson, Stewart and Company, a successful coal mine and lime kiln operator. The firm had invested heavily in a Pittsburgh bank which failed after the Panic of 1873. Because of the double liability of stockholders (up to twice the amount of the investment), the business was ruined and his father lost everything, including his house.

Dickson left school at age 11 and began working full time, first running errands for a lamp and glassware store in Pittsburgh for $3.00 per week. After several other jobs closer to home, he was attracted by the higher wages at Homestead and entered the steel mill on April 28, 1881 at 6pm for a 12-hour shift. His first job was in the blooming mill as a "spell hand" for the pulpit boys, who operated valves that controlled cranes. Later he worked in the converting and rail mills. In 1886, he was shifted to clerical work in the mills and, less exhausted at the end of the day, enrolled in Duff's Mercantile College in downtown Pittsburgh and studied bookkeeping and accounting. In August, 1889, he was called to the Pittsburgh office and his career took off.

== Private life ==
At Swissvale on February 22, 1888, Dickson married Mary Bruce Dickson (1865-1944), daughter of Thomas Bruce Dickson and Mary McCrory Dickson (same last name, no relation). Together they had six children.

On April 1, 1901 he resigned his position at Carnegie Steel Company and went to New York with Charles M. Schwab, president of United States Steel Corporation, which began business on that date. Dickson moved his family to Montclair, New Jersey, where he bought a home on Llewellyn Road to which he added wings designed by New York architect Frank E. Wallis.

Nurtured in the bosom of the Presbyterian Church, by mid-life Dickson had forsworn all "dogmatic religion" and described himself as an "Ethical Christian."

Dickson was a founding member of the Montclair Art Museum in 1913. His portrait was painted by renowned American Impressionist William Merritt Chase in 1905 and was donated to the museum in 1976 by Dickson's children. A lover of music and a self-taught pianist, he was a sponsor of the Llewellyn Ensemble, which met at his home in Montclair in 1916 and 1917 and evolved into the Montclair Orchestra. "They Shall Beat Their Swords into Plow-shares" is an anthem composed in 1934 by Mark Andrews and dedicated to Dickson, "a great lover of music and men." Dickson was the driving force behind the creation of Montclair's parks. In 1906, he spearheaded the referendum to create the network of city parks.

Dickson purchased a 150-acre farm with twin gambrel-roofed barns and a small farm house near Littleton in the North Country of New Hampshire at the western edge of the White Mountains. Between 1902 and 1909, on a hilltop above the farm with views of Mount Lafayette and the Kinsman Ridge, he built Highland Croft, a stone and wood lodge with nine inter-connecting bedrooms. He would bring more than two-dozen family members to Littleton each summer. He founded the Highland Chorus, which held practice afternoons at the farm. Sixty members strong, the Highland Chorus put on its first concert at the Littleton Opera House in 1923.

== Death ==
William B. Dickson died at Highland Croft in 1942 after a four-month illness. He is buried in Allegheny Cemetery in Pittsburgh.

== Writings ==
- Article: "Can American Steel Plants Afford an Eight-Hour Turn." The Survey, January 3, 1914.
- Article: "The Problem of Organized Labor and Organized Capital." The Montclair Times, March 20, 1915.
- Article: "Eight-Hour Day and Six-Day Week in the Continuous Industries." The American Labor Legislation Review, Vol. VII, No. 1, March, 1917.
- Article: "Some Twentieth Century Problems." Mechanical Engineering, The Journal of the American Society of Mechanical Engineering, May, 1919.
- Article: "A Declaration of Inter-Dependence." Courier Mail Bag, Summer, 1932.
- Article: "Democracy at the Crossroads." The World Wide Listener, October, 1939.
- Article: "Equal Partners." Social Progress, September, 1939.
- Article: "World Peace – Or Chaos?" The World Wide Listener, January, 1940.
- Pamphlet: Is It True Think You, a collection of articles reprinted from The Littleton Courier, 1924.
- Pamphlet: A Political Platform for 1936, 1936
- Pamphlet: Democracy in Industry, 1931 (revised February, 1935)
- Paper: Read to 28th Annual Reunion and Dinner of Carnegie Veterans Association, December 13, 1929
- Poetry: A Collection of Poems by William B. Dickson, 1962, compiled and published by Emma Dickson Carswell
