= Suran Dickson =

New Zealand LGBT activist (born 1977)

- Born: 1977 (age 48–49); New Zealand

Suran Dickson (born 1977 in New Zealand) is an LGBT and anti-bullying activist. She was the chief executive officer of the British charity Diversity Role Models, which works to reduce homophobic bullying in schools. She founded the charity in 2011.

In 2014, The Independent on Sunday ranked Dickson 10th in its Rainbow List of influential LGBTQ people, having ranked her 20th in the 2013 list, and listed her as a "national treasure" in the 2011 list. In 2014, The Guardian listed her 54th in its World Pride Power List, up from 73rd in its 2013 list.

Prior to setting up Diversity Role Models, Dickson worked as a school teacher in New Zealand and the United Kingdom.

Dickson left Diversity Role Models in the 2016-7 financial year to return to New Zealand and was succeeded by Claire Harvey. She is now a director at Flipside Consulting.
