= Robert Alexander (priest) =

Irish Anglican priest

Robert Alexander (19 June 1788 – 31 July 1840) was an Anglican priest in Ireland during the 19th century.

He was educated at Trinity College Dublin. He was Archdeacon of Down from 1814 until 1828.

His daughter Charlotte Melosina Elizabeth Alexander (ca. 1829–1900) died unmarried at Liscar, Amersham in March 1900.
