= Aaron Dickson =

Northern Irish artist

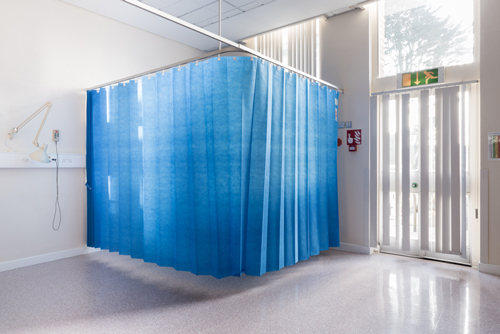
Untitled from the series Notes On Hospitals by Aaron Dickson

Aaron Dickson (born 1980) is a Northern Irish artist specializing in photography. He lives in his birthplace of Northern Ireland.

== Life and work ==
Dickson graduated from the New Zealand Film & Television School in Wellington, New Zealand in 2009 where his tutors included John Reid and Geoff Murphy. In 2016 he gained a Master of Fine Arts degree in Photography from Ulster University, Belfast where his tutors included Paul Seawright, Donovan Wylie and Martin Parr.

His first photographic project entitled Notes On Hospitals looked at the developing crisis within Northern Irish hospitals. Cliff Lauson, curator of London's Hayward Gallery commented, "I find it quite difficult to imagine a hospital without people in it; like a school or a theatre, people define these places. Dickson's photography of the interiors of a number of Irish hospitals provides a trail of unpopulated photographs. It's hard to tell if the hospitals have been abandoned or are in use as his images are very sparse and uncluttered. I particularly like the way that Dickson has considered light in his images - balancing natural exterior light with the harsher casts of interior functional and efficient lighting."

An image from the series was awarded the silver medal at the Tokyo International Foto Awards and commended at the Sony World Photography Awards 2017. Irish Arts Review published images from the project in their New generation Artists Online Gallery and Shoair Mavlian, curator at Tate Modern commented, "Photography has an amazing ability to reveal beauty in the everyday, and this is precisely what Dickson has managed to achieve in his project 'Notes on Hospitals'. By limiting himself to within the confines of the hospital walls Dick~~in~~son was forced to look closer and harder at the ordinary, bland and mundane interior of a busy working public building. His images reveal structure, form and beauty found within the everyday environment. Dickson also manages to capture the passing of time shown through the wear and tear on the physical space and moments of calm and absence. Overall there is a sustained focus and consistency to the project."

The online magazine for contemporary photography FotoRoom, published excerpts from Dickson's series Outlines commenting, "In his previously unpublished series Outlines, Irish photographer Aaron Dickson (born 1980) creates a dramatic contrast between the landscapes he photographs and the human beings who move around in them, questioning how we use the spaces we inhabit."

== Exhibitions ==
- Royal Hibernian Academy 187th Annual Exhibition, Dublin, Ireland (2017)
- Sony World Photography Awards, London, England (2017)
- Tokyo International Foto Awards, Tokyo, Japan (2016)
- Dublin Art Book Fair, Dublin, Ireland (2016)
- Royal Ulster Academy 135th Annual Exhibition, Belfast, Northern Ireland (2016)
- UU MFA, Belfast, Northern Ireland (2016)
- PhotoIreland Festival (2016)
- Octo, Belfast, Northern Ireland (2016)
- Pause, Belfast, Northern Ireland (2015)
