= Mary Bernard Dickson =

New Zealand nun (c. 1811 – 1895)

Mary Bernard Dickson (c.1811 – 5 August 1895) was a New Zealand nun, nurse and teacher. She was born in Ipswich, Suffolk, England c.1811. She worked under Florence Nightingale in the Crimean War. Dickson moved to New Zealand in 1857 where she became a superior of the Sisters of Mercy.
