= Maria Lindsay =

English composer and songwriter

Maria Lindsay Bliss (15 May 1827 – 3 April 1898) was an English composer and songwriter. She was born in Wimbledon and married the Reverend John Worthington Bliss in 1858. She was one of the first women to achieve commercial success as an English songwriter in the 19th century, obtaining an exclusive contract with publisher Robert Cocks in London. She died in Betteshanger, Kent.

== Works ==
Lindsay composed sacred and popular songs, often using contemporary poetry as text. Selected works include:

- Absalom, 1868
- Excelsior (Text: Henry Wadsworth Longfellow), 1854
- Home They Brought Her Warrior Dead (Text: Lord Alfred Tennyson), 1858
- A psalm of life (Text: Henry Wadsworth Longfellow)
- Daybreak (Text: Henry Wadsworth Longfellow)
- Excelsior (Text: Henry Wadsworth Longfellow)
- Hymn of the Moravian nuns at Bethlehem at the Consecration of Pulaski's Banner (Text: Henry Wadsworth Longfellow)
- Stars of the summer night (Text: Henry Wadsworth Longfellow)
- The Bridge (Text: Henry Wadsworth Longfellow)
- The old clock on the stairs (Text: Henry Wadsworth Longfellow)
- The Owl and the Pussycat (Text: Edward Lear)
- The Song of Love and Death (Text: Lord Alfred Tennyson)
- Too late, too late! (Text: Lord Alfred Tennyson)
- With many a curve (Text: Lord Alfred Tennyson)
