= Evangeline Dickson =

British artist (1922–2004)

- Born: Evangeline Sladen; 31 August 1922; Sheffield, England
- Died: 21 May 2004 (aged 81); Wirksworth, Derbyshire
- Known for: Painting
- Spouse(s): John Wanless Dickson, m. 1949-2001, his death

Evangeline Mary Lambart Dickson née Sladen (31 August 1922 – 21 May 2004) was a British landscape artist and painter.

== Biography ==
Dickson was born in Sheffield into a family active in the Salvation Army; her great-grandfather was General William Booth and her great-aunt was Evangeline Booth. After boarding school in Devon, Dickson worked as a nurse and teacher before, in 1960, she and her surgeon husband moved to the village of Westerfield in Suffolk. There she studied with two local artists, Anna Airy and Violet Garrod, and became a prolific artist in her own right. Working in a variety of styles, Dickson painted landscapes and flower pictures in pastels, watercolour and mixed media. Her 1992 exhibition Ancient Places, at the Salisbury and South Wiltshire Museum, featured paintings of the monuments at Stonehenge, at Avebury and the Uffington White Horse. Her flower paintings illustrated a number of natural history guide books. Dickson exhibited with the Royal Watercolour Society, the Royal Institute of Painters in Water Colours, at the Paris Salon and with the Ipswich Art Society. She also had solo shows at the Clarges Gallery, at Christchurch Mansion in Ipswich and at the Graves Art Gallery in Sheffield.
