= Lawrence Dickson =

Tuskegee Airman (1920–1944)

Captain 2nd Lieutenant Lawrence E. Dickson
- Lawrence E. Dickson in 1943
- Born: Lawrence Everett Dickson; May 31, 1920; Bronx, New York
- Died: December 23, 1944 (aged 24); Italy
- Burial place: Arlington National Cemetery
- Spouse: Phyllis C. Dickson
- Relatives: Daughter Marla
- Military career
- Branch: United States Army Air Force
- Service years: 1943–1944
- Rank: Captain
- Unit: 100th Fighter Squadron 332d Fighter Group
- Awards: Congressional Gold Medal; Distinguished Flying Cross; Air Medal with four oak leaf clusters; Purple Heart

Lawrence Everett Dickson (May 31, 1920 – December 23, 1944) was an American pilot and a member of the famed group of the World War II-era Tuskegee Airmen. Dickson flew 68 mission in World War II before he was forced to eject from his aircraft over Austria in 1944. Dickson was declared missing in action. On July 27, 2018, Dickson's remains were identified by the Defense POW/MIA Accounting Agency.

== Military service ==
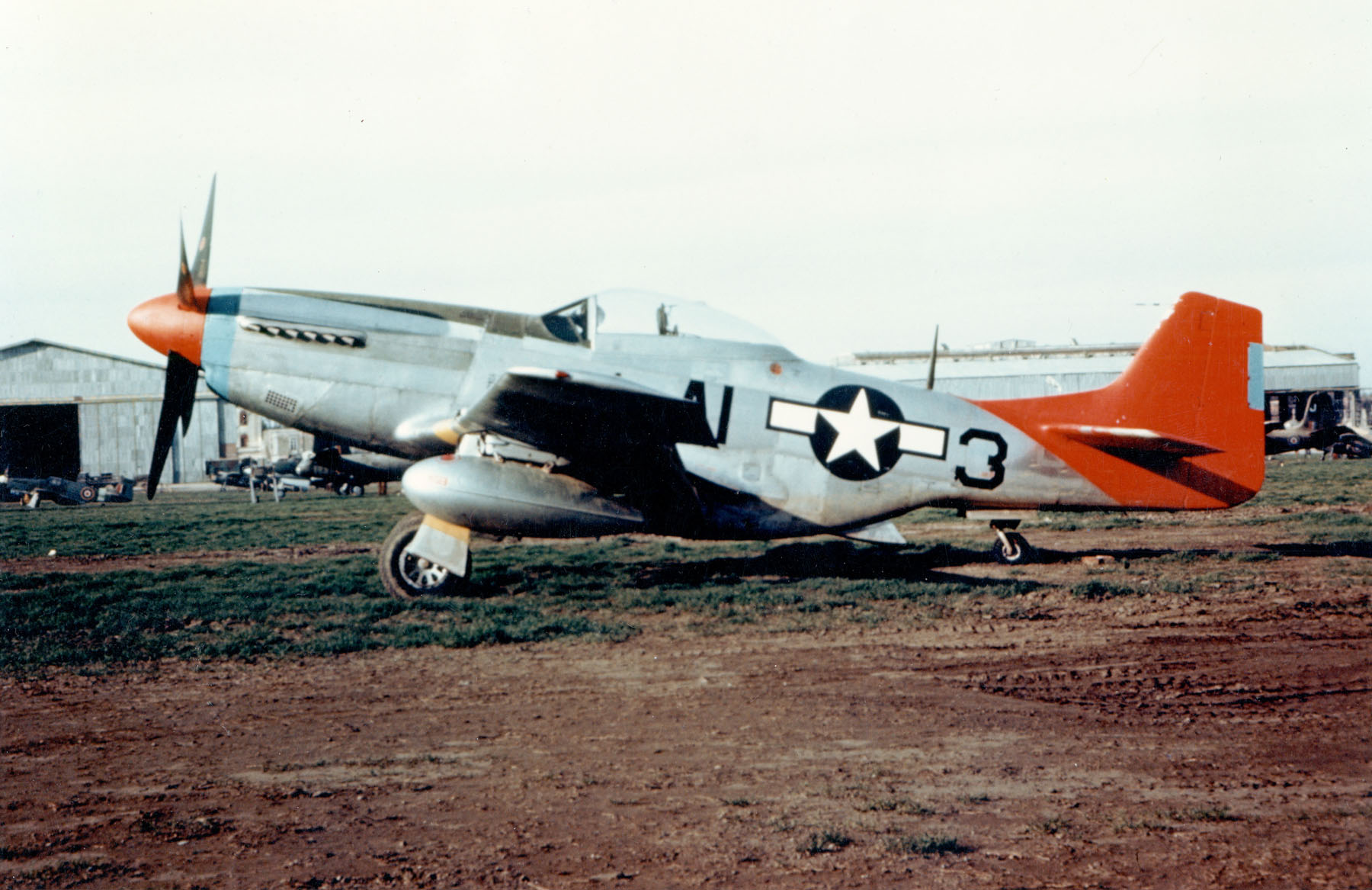
The Tuskegee Airmen's aircraft had distinctive markings that led to the name, "Red Tails." (Note: The red markings that distinguished the Tuskegee Airmen included red bands on the noses of P-51s as well as a red rudder; their P-51B and D Mustangs flew with similar color schemes, with red propeller spinners, yellow wing bands and all-red tail surfaces.)

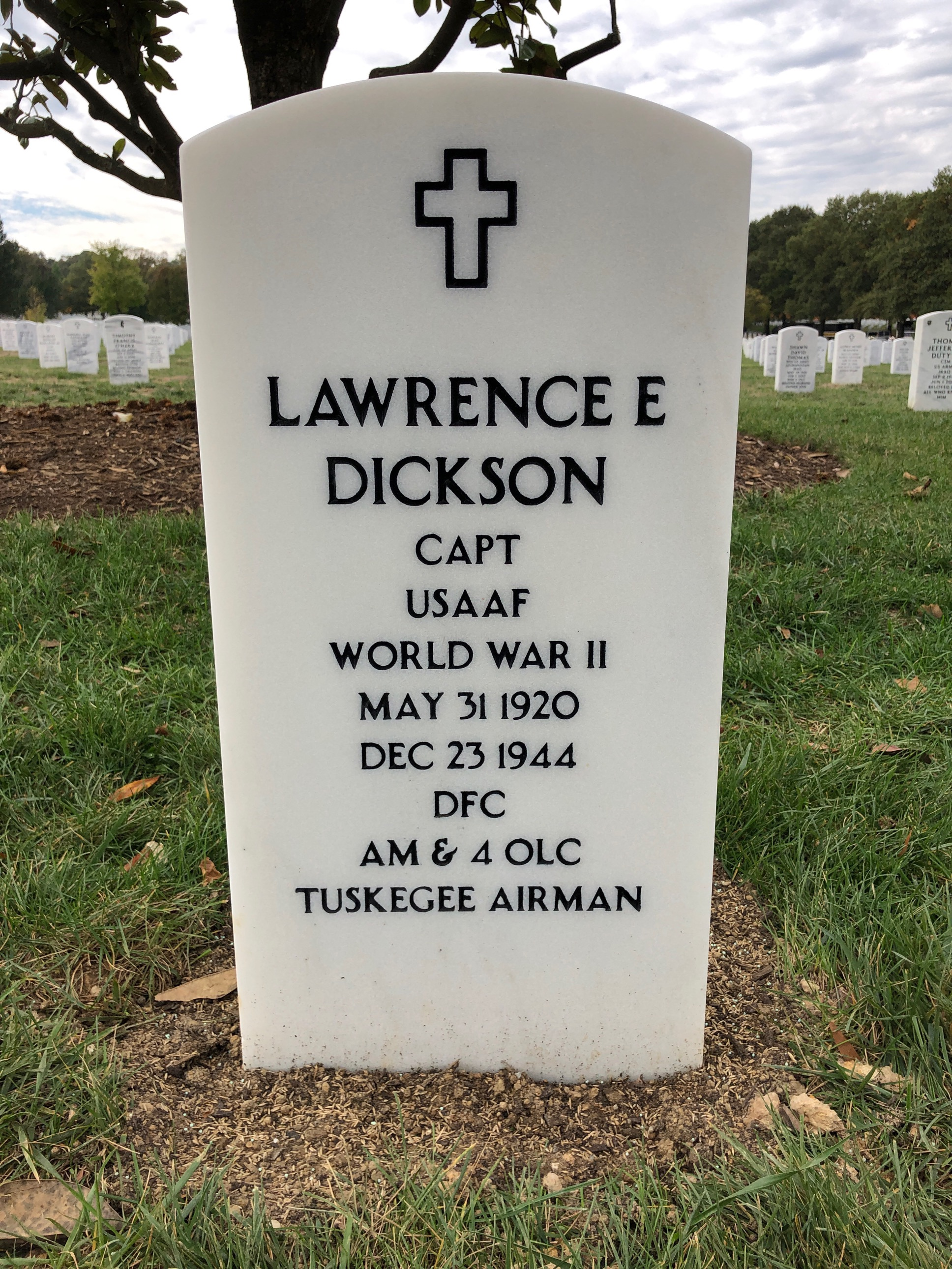
Grave at Arlington National Cemetery

Dickson graduated from Tuskegee in Alabama March 25, 1943. He was sent to Italy and assigned to the 100th Fighter Squadron, 332d Fighter Group. On December 23, 1944, Dickson was on his 68th mission piloting his aircraft as part of a mission to Prague, Czechoslovakia. On the return flight he ejected from his P-51 aircraft over Austria. The aircraft was flipped upside down and Dickson was declared missing in action.

Early in the mission Dickson reported engine trouble and notified his base in Ramitelli, Italy that he needed to return. Dickson broke from the mission and two wingmen escorted Dickson's sputtering plane. The trio gradually lost altitude, and Dickson looked for a spot to land or bail out. One of Dickson's wingmen (Martin) thought they were near the town of Tarvisio, in a mountainous area of northeastern Italy. Dickson's two wingmen followed but they were forced to take evasive action when Dickson's plane sputtered and dove: Dickson's engine trouble was catastrophic and he was forced to eject over Hohenthurn, Austria. One of Dickson's wingmen insisted that he saw Dickson eject but the December snowfall complicated the search for Dickson's white parachute. Dickson was declared missing in action. After the war it was revealed that German records had reported that a P-51 plane crashed at that site the day that Dickson disappeared.

During World War II the United States Army was segregated and black pilots had different rules. The black pilots of the Tuskegee Airmen could not qualify for R&R until they completed 70 missions. White pilots could take R&R after 50 missions. Dickson was on his 68th mission when he went missing over Austria.

== Recovery and burial ==
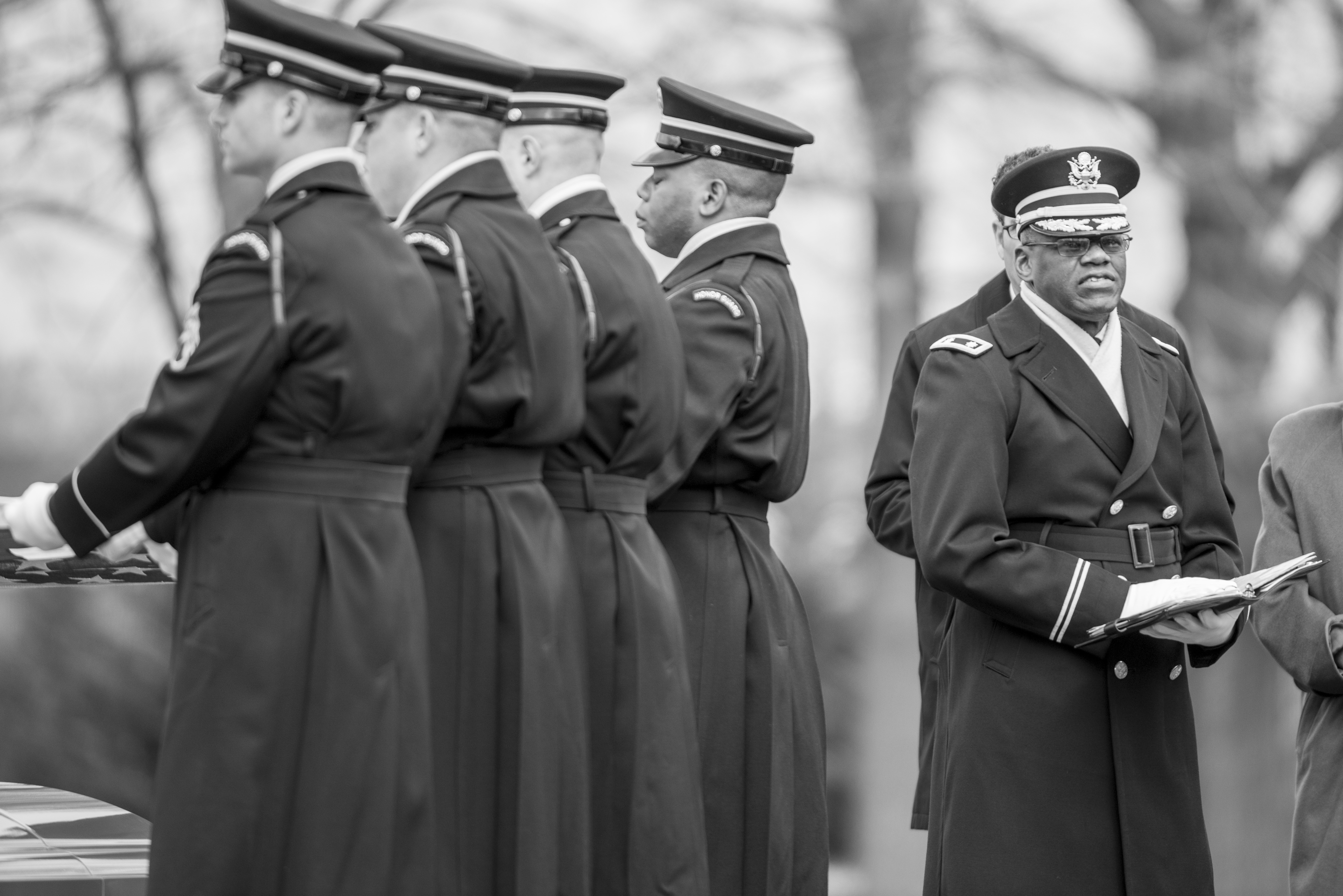
Dickson's funeral at Arlington National Cemetery (March 22, 2019)

On July 27, 2018, Dickson's remains were identified by the Defense POW/MIA Accounting Agency. A local researcher named Roland Domanig discovered the crash site and the human remains. The researcher said he visited the site in the 1950s as a child, but had not discovered the remains until 2002. An archaeological crew was sent to the site in 2017 and they recovered bone fragments which matched Lawrence Dickson's daughter's DNA.

Also recovered at the crash site was a 14-karat ring that was inscribed: "P.D.,” with a heart with an arrow through it. The ring also was inscribed "L.E.D. 5-31-43". P.D. were the initials of his wife Phyllis Dickson. L.E.D. Lawrence E Dickson and May 31, 1943, was his 23rd birthday. The Army also recovered a remnant of a harmonica and a small cross.

On March 22, 2019, Lawrence E. Dickson was laid to rest in a ceremony at Arlington National Cemetery. Four Air Force jets flew overhead while his daughter and grandchildren attended. His daughter Marla accepted the folded American flag from a kneeling Army General.

=== Awards ===
- Congressional Gold Medal 2007
- Distinguished Flying Cross
- Air Medal with four oak leaf clusters
- Purple Heart

== Education ==
Tuskegee Institute 1943

== Personal life ==
Lawrence Dickson was born to Agnes C. Dickson and he had two brothers. He was married to Phyllis. Dickson and his wife had a daughter. On July 14, 1942, at Harlem's Sydenham Hospital, Marla Dickson was born.

Dickson's wife did not live to attend the burial of her husband: Phyllis died December 28, 2017, in Nevada at the age of 96.

== See also ==
- Executive Order 9981
- Fly (2009 play about the 332d Fighter Group)
- List of African American Medal of Honor recipients
- List of solved missing person cases
- List of Tuskegee Airmen
- Military history of African Americans
