= Harold Dickson (Missouri politician) =

American politician (1906–1990)

Member of the U.S. House of Representatives from Missouri's 112nd district
- Incumbent
- Assumed office 1963

Missouri House of Representatives

Personal details
- Born: 1906 near California, Missouri, US
- Died: 1990 (aged 83–84)
- Party: Republican
- Spouse: Lorene Gentzsch
- Children: 1 son
- Occupation: science teacher and businessman

Harold Dickson (June 2, 1906 – April 30, 1990) was an American Republican politician who served in the Missouri House of Representatives. He was born near California, Missouri, and was educated at California public schools in Missouri and at William Jewell College in Liberty, Missouri. In 1934, he married Lorene Gentzsch. Dickson worked as a science teacher, a coach, an inspector, a service station operator, and a part-time insurance agent.
