= John Dickson (American poet) =

American poet and short story writer

John Dickson (1916–2009) was an American poet and short story writer. He published several books of verse and had hundreds of poems published in Harper's, Poetry and other periodicals. Born in Chicago and a longtime resident of nearby Evanston, Illinois, he was a 1990 Fellow of the National Endowment for the Arts, and was one of the first to have his works featured on Chicago Transit Authority buses as part of its Poetry-on-the-Buses project. He began writing as a student at Furman College in South Carolina, and spent 43 years as a grain trader at the Chicago Board of Trade before pursuing writing full time.
