= Robbie Dickson =

British-Canadian engineer

- Education: University of Wales
- Occupations: Engineer, inventor, angel investor, entrepreneur
- Known for: Founder of Firgelli Technologies, Firgelli Automations, and the Canadian Bullrun Rally

Robbie Dickson is a British-Canadian engineer and entrepreneur who was involved in the Canadian racing industry. He co-founded the Canadian version of the Bullrun Rally and the Formula One racetrack Area 27 alongside drivers Bill Drossos and Jacques Villeneuve.

== Early life and education ==
He was born in the United Kingdom, and became interested in supercars after watching the film Cannonball Run as a child. He graduated with an engineering degree from the University of Wales.

== Career ==
Dickson began his engineering career working with automotive and aerospace manufacturers including Rolls-Royce, BMW, Isuzu, and Ford, later working as an engine designer for Westport Innovations in Vancouver.

In the early 2000s, he competed in the Race the Base Event at CFB Cold Lake in Cold Lake, Alberta. During this event, he misjudged the braking distance that was necessary to make the turn at the end of the runway. Consequently, his car spun out of control. Dickson then turned to brake design, with a stated intent to design a more efficient braking system than the standard hydraulic brakes. Using the established system of air brakes, he created an auxiliary brake system for supercars based on other fast-moving vehicles such as trains. The system engages automatically when speeds greater than 100km/h are reached and the foot brake is applied.

=== Firgelli Automations ===
He later founded Attivo Design to market his auxiliary air brake. The technology used by Attivo was manufactured by Firgelli Automations, a company specializing in actuators and control devices, founded by Dickson in 2002. As of 2023, Dickson remains the CEO of Firgelli Automations.

=== Area 27 and Cannonball Run ===
Dickson's love of the film Cannonball Run inspired him to team up with Bill Drossos and Canadian Formula One racer Jacques Villeneuve to create the racetrack and race club Area 27. The track derives its name from Jacques' racing number. Dickson's group negotiated with the Osoyoos Indian Band for a long-term lease on the land. GPS-guided earthmovers were used to trace the layout of the 4.9 kilometer track, and 12,139 feet of concrete was used on the track and its barriers. The track is now a full-sized racing club with an on-site racing school and other facilities.

He later founded the annual Diamond Rally, an invite-only charity rally of 200 supercars, sponsored by Hublot Vancouver. The rally raises money for charity and runs from Vancouver to Whistler and the Okanagan via the Sea-to-Sky Highway.

== Venture capitalist ==
Dickson is a venture capitalist and angel investor who has supported various businesses, including assisting De Beers Diamond in opening its first jewelry store in Canada. Committed to sustainable innovation, he invests in clean-tech companies focused on environmentally friendly solutions and zero-emission technologies. His portfolio includes investments in Etalim Inc. and other companies developing technologies with potential future applications.

== Personal life ==
Dickson is an avid car collector and has owned hundreds of automobiles in his lifetime. The first brand-new car he purchased was a custom Lamborghini Aventador Roadster. In 2011, The Vancouver Sun profiled Dickson and his $1,000,000 garage renovation, complete with 120 spotlights, a full-size bar, and a lifelike fiberglass model of Michael Schumacher's F1 Ferrari.
