= Moses Oruaze Dickson =

Lawyer and entrepreneur (born 1985)

- Born: August 13, 1985 (age 41); Bayelsa State, Nigeria
- Education: University of Bradford PhD(International Law), Salford Business School MSc(Financial Service Management), University of London LLM(International Business Law), University of Bedfordshire LLM(International Commercial Law), Niger Delta University LLB
- Occupations: Lawyer, Lecturer, Entrepreneur and Philanthropist

Dr Moses Oruaze Dickson (born August 13, 1985) is a Nigerian lawyer, entrepreneur and philanthropist. He is the managing solicitor of TRIAX Solicitors; a Bayelsa State, Nigeria-based law firm. He is the founder of Goldcoast Developmental foundation.

== Early life ==
He was born on 13 August 1985 in Toru-Orua Town of Sagbama Local Government Area of Bayelsa State, Nigeria. Oruaze holds a distinction in Master of Law- LLM in International Commercial Law from the University of Bedfordshire, as well as a first degree, Law, and a Bachelors in Law from the Nigerian Law School.

== Career ==
Oruaze founded the Solalina Investment Group, a company with interest in various industries, including oil and gas. In 2017, Solalina Investment Limited, in conjunction with Canterbury Christ Church University UK, embarked on a £4000 research project on International investment agreements and economic development in Africa.

In October 2018, the Goldcoast foundation provided relief materials to women and children affected by the flood in the Niger Delta region and received a commendation from the Vice President, Prof. Yemi Osibanjo, during his visits to flood-affected states.

He spoke in support of women's rights, equal opportunities for women and the use of technology by young professionals.

== Goldcoast Developmenatal Foundation ==
In 2012, Moses founded the Goldcoast Developmental Foundation, a non profit organization which focuses on building a healthier and educated communities across the Niger Delta.

== Publications ==
Year	Title	Work
2017	Rebalancing international investment agreements in favour of host states: Is it time for a regional investment court?	Emerald Publishing Limited
2017	Replacing Lis Pendens with Forum Non Conveniens: A viable solution to tactical litigaton in the EU	European Competition Law Review
2017	Duties and Liabilities of the Paying Bank under the Bill of Exchange	International Journal of Law and Management
2017	Tactical litigation in the post-Recast Brussels Regulation era	European Competition Law Review
2018	A case for a Regional Investment Court for Africa	North Carolina Journal of International Law, Vol 43(1) pp. 67–96.
2018	Party Autonomy and Justice in International commercial arbitration	International Journal of Law and Management
2018	Proposal for an Appeals Tribunal in investment Treaty Arbitration	International Company and Commercial Law
2018	Scopes for an Appeals Facility within International Commercial Arbitration	European Competition Law Review

== Awards ==
Moses has received multiple awards and recognitions towards his contributions to Humanity and Law. In 2024, Moses was awarded the Humanitarian Service Award by the Rotary Club.
