= Dawn Dickson =

American businesswoman (born 1979)

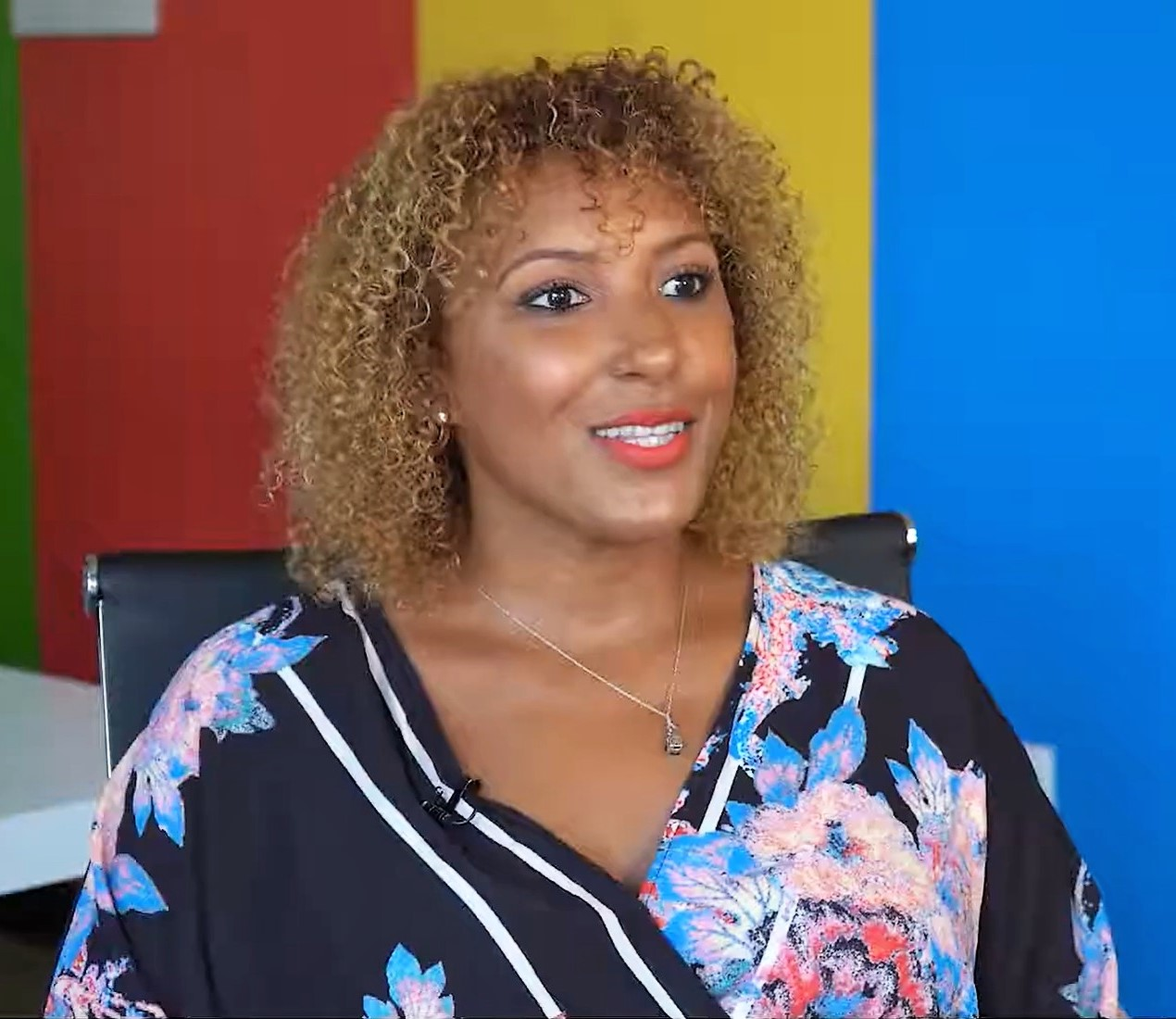
- Dickson-Akpoghene in 2020
- Born: Dawn Dickson; January 1, 1979 (age 47); Columbus, Ohio, U.S.
- Education: Ohio State University
- Occupation: Businesswoman
- Known for: Founder and owner of PopCom
- Spouse: Frederick Kevbe Akpoghene (m. 2019)
- Children: 1

Dawn Dickson (born January 1, 1979), also known as Dawn Dickson Akpoghene, is an American businesswoman. She is the founder of retail technology company PopCom and women's shoe company Flat Out of Heels.

== Early life and education ==
Born in Columbus, Ohio, Dickson's mother ran an in-home day care service and her father remodeled homes. Their family also operated a demolition business. As a child, she made money by selling candy, old toys, and lemonade.

Dickson received a Bachelor's of Arts degree in journalism at Ohio State University and did graduate work at DeVry University in information technology. She was later selected for the Nasdaq Entrepreneurial Center's Milestone Makers program, as part of its Fall 2019 cohort of mid-stage entrepreneurs.

== Career ==
After an internship at Nationwide Insurance, Dickson was offered a full-time position as a business analyst. She then ran online marketing for agents in a subsidiary of Nationwide. Dickson founded her first company, TheUrbanStarr.com, in 2002, while still working at Nationwide and studying at DeVry. TheUrbanStarr.com was a web site highlighting local entertainment and events in Central Ohio, which streamed music and videos online before the existence of YouTube.

In 2005, Dickson started her own consulting business in online marketing and business development. She then moved to Atlanta, and later on to Miami. She finally closed TheUrbanStarr.com web site during the 2008 recession.

=== Flat Out of Heels ===
In 2011, Dickson came up with the idea for Flat Out of Heels after wearing heels all day at an event, and looking for comfortable flat shoes to buy at the airport. Unable to find what she needed, she noticed that many other women were walking around the airport barefoot. Her solution was to create rollable flats that can fit in a purse and be sold in vending machines to help women find relief from sore feet. She raised $1.3 million in investment for Flat Out Heels.

=== PopCom ===
Dickson launched Shoe Vending International, Inc. (renamed Solutions Vending International, Inc. in 2014 and PopCom in 2017) to build vending machines in order to sell her shoes. She found a supplier in the United Kingdom and placed her first Flat Out of Heels machine in Hartsfield Jackson Atlanta International Airport, followed by LIV Nightclub in Fountainbleu Hotel in Miami, Bayside Marketplace in Miami, My Fair Sweets in Atlanta, MGM Grand Casino in Las Vegas and she held pop-up shops with the machine in venues around the country. In 2014 Dickson was invited to appear on the CNBC/Yahoo web show "Your Biz Fix" hosted by Marcus Lemonis. After the show Dickson decided to build vending machines for more than just Flat Out of Heels and in 2020 Dickson received a patent for the PopShop Digital vending machine.

In 2019, Dickson raised a security token offering (STO) when she secured over $1 million for PopCom using equity crowdfunding and, in 2020, started a second equity crowdfunding campaign that raised $1.07M. The campaign eventually closed in 2022, with PopCom crowdfunding a total of $6 million from over 10,000 investors. Being an early adopter of crypto currency and blockchain technology, she was invited to testify before a Congressional committee on small business in March 2020 in a hearing titled Building Blocks of Change: The Benefits of Blockchain Technology for Small Businesses.

=== Other projects ===
Dickson is the host of the BARS! Podcast where she discusses how to be an entrepreneur. She is also the owner of Nia Studio, a yoga studio named after her daughter located in Columbus, Ohio.
