= Glenn Dickson (footballer) =

Australian rules footballer

Personal information
- Full name: Glenn Dickson
- Born: 5 November 1954 (age 71)
- Original team: Prahran, Victoria
- Height: 185 cm (6 ft 1 in)
- Weight: 79 kg (174 lb)

Playing career^{1}
Years	Club	Games (Goals)
1977–78	Richmond	11 (10)
- ^{1} Playing statistics correct to the end of 1978.

Glenn Dickson (born 5 November 1954) is a former Australian rules footballer who played with Richmond in the Victorian Football League (VFL). He is the father of Tory Dickson.
