= Elias Evander Dickson =

American politician

Elias Evander Dickson (c. 1832 – 1909) was a state senator in South Carolina serving during the Reconstruction era. He served as chairman of the committee on agriculture. He was white.

He was the son of John LeGrande Dickson and Mary Ann Dickson (née Huggins).

He was a delegate to South Carolina's 1868 constitutional convention. In 1870 he was elected to the South Carolina Senate from Clarendon County.

He cosigned a request to Governor Daniel Henry Chamberlain for U.S. troops to be stationed in Manning.

He was described as an honorable Christian gentleman after his death.
