= James Dickson (rugby union) =

Rugby union player from Northern Ireland

- Full name: James Alfred Nicholson Dickson
- Born: 12 March 1897 Enniskillen, Ireland
- Died: 24 November 1963 (aged 66) Fermanagh, Northern Ireland
- School: Portora Royal School
- University: Trinity College Dublin

Rugby union career
- Position: Wing
International career
Years	Team	Apps	(Points)
1920	Ireland	3	(3)

James Alfred Nicholson Dickson (12 March 1897 — 24 November 1963) was an Irish international rugby union player.

Born in Enniskillen, Dickson attended Portora Royal School and served as an officer in the Royal Inniskilling Fusiliers during World War I, then later with the Machine Gun Corps. He also had two brothers who served. In 1916, Dickson was wounded in action and sent to a hospital in England to recover.

Dickson represented the "Mother County" in the 1919 King's Cup against a New Zealand Army team. He played rugby for Dublin University and was capped three times for Ireland in 1920. After scoring a try on debut against England, Dickson missed the next match with influenza, before back to back appearances against Wales and France.

A dental surgeon, Dickson had a long-standing practice in Enniskillen.

== See also ==
- List of Ireland national rugby union players
