= James Dickson (cricketer) =

New Zealand cricketer

Personal information
- Born: 1887
- Died: 21 July 1970 (aged 82–83); Auckland, New Zealand
- Source: Cricinfo, 24 October 2020

James Dickson (1887 – 21 July 1970) was a New Zealand cricketer. He played in three first-class matches for Wellington from 1911 to 1915.

== See also ==
- List of Wellington representative cricketers
