= James Dickson (merchant) =

Scottish-Swedish merchant, industrialist, banker and philanthropist (1784–1855)

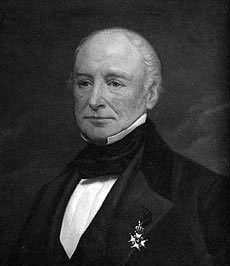
- James Dickson (1784-1855)
- Born: 3 February 1784
- Died: 17 November 1855 (aged 71); Gothenburg

James Dickson (3 February 1784 – 17 November 1855) was a Scottish-Swedish merchant, industrialist, banker and philanthropist active in Gothenburg, Sweden.

== Life ==
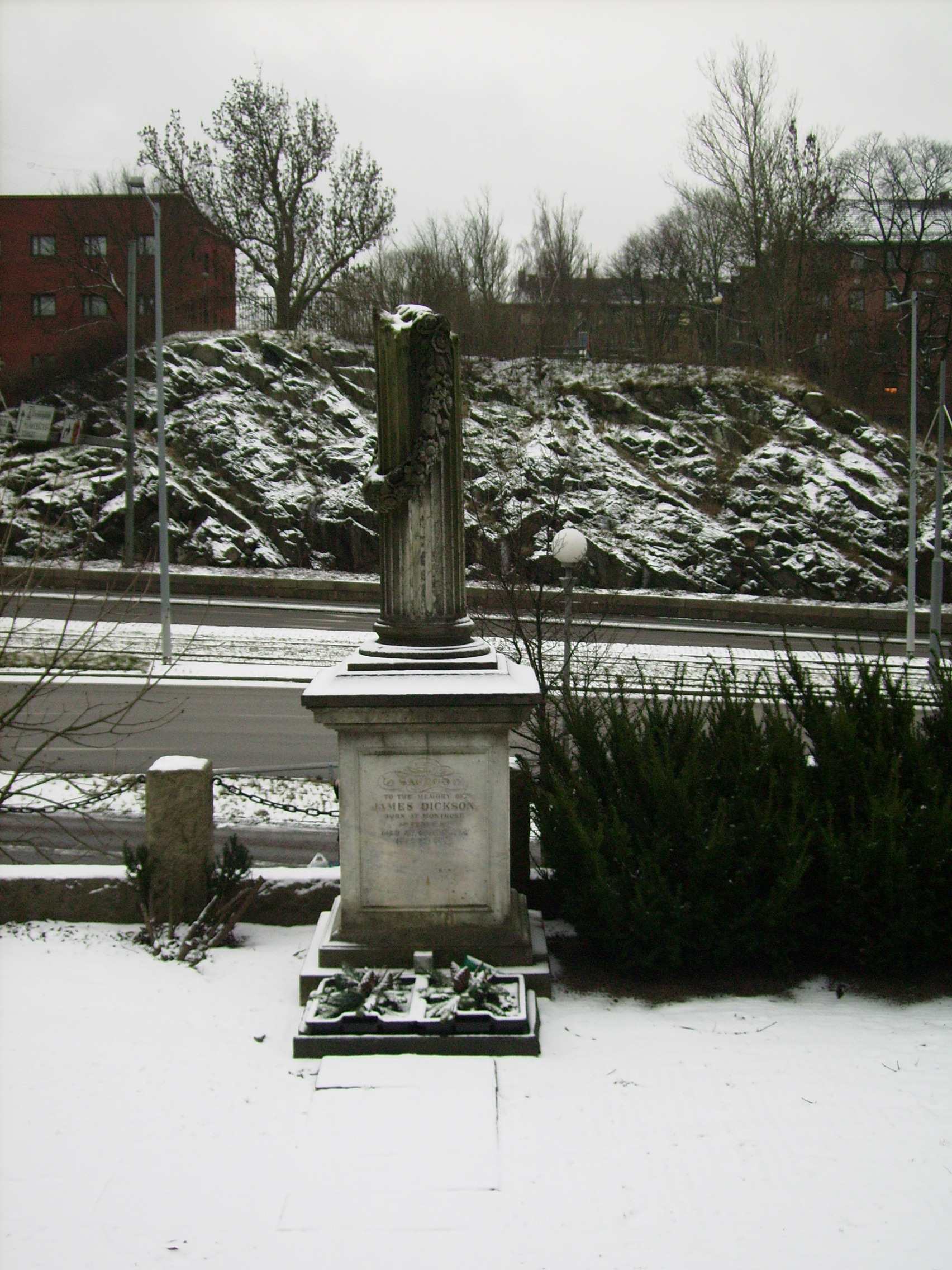
James Dickson the elders grave at Örgryte gamla kyrka, Gothenburg

James Dickson was the son of the merchant James Dickson and Christina Murray, the brother of Robert Dickson, and the father of James Jameson Dickson and Oscar Dickson.

James Dickson was first employed in the Dickson family office in Edinburgh in 1798, but emigrated to Sweden in 1809, seven years after his older brother Robert, and settled in Gothenburg, where he was granted Swedish citizenship on 1 March 1810. He was an ambitious businessman, who in 1816 founded the firm James Dickson & Co, one of the wealthiest of the many Gothenburg trading companies.

Dickson served as principal of the Gothenburg Savings Bank (1829-1833) and in 1831 he became a member of the Health Committee of Gothenburg, created to deal with the expected arrival of cholera (which indeed came to Gothenburg in 1834, the first cases in Sweden).

He was one of the founders of the Trädgårdsföreningen (Garden Society) of Gothenburg.

In 1814 he married Margaret Eleanor Bagge (1795-1857), and the family lived at Södra Hamngatan 5. The house was built around 1805 for the Councillor Carl Bagge (1754-1818) and was subsequently transferred to his son in law James Dickson Sr. It was used as the office and residence of the family until the early 1860s.
