= Hugh Dickson (footballer, born 1981) =

Northern Irish footballer (born 1981)

Personal information
- Date of birth: 28 August 1981 (age 45)
- Place of birth: Northern Ireland
- Position: Defender

Senior career*
Years	Team	Apps	(Gls)
1999–2000	Glentoran	5	(0)
2000–2001	Wigan Athletic	1	(0)
2002	Ards	7	(1)
2002–2003	Linfield	13	(2)
2003–2007	Elgin City	96	(6)
2008–2010	Glenavon		
2010–2015	Killyleagh		
- * Club domestic league appearances and goals

Hugh Dickson (born 28 August 1981) is a Northern Irish former professional footballer who played as a defender.

== Career ==
Dickson started his career with Northern Irish side Glentoran, helping them win the 1999–2000 Irish Cup. In 2000, Dickson signed for Wigan in the English third tier, where he made 4 appearances and scored 0 goals. On 19 December 2000, he debuted for Wigan during a 1–2 loss to Notts County. Before the second half of 2001–02, Dickson signed for Northern Irish club Ards. In 2002, he signed for Linfield in the Northern Irish top flight.

In 2003, he signed for Scottish fourth tier team Elgin City. Before the second half of 2007–08, Dickson signed for Glenavon in the Northern Irish top flight, where he suffered a fractured skull. In 2010, he signed for Northern Irish fourth tier outfit Killyleagh.
