= James Bell Dickson =

US Army Air Force pilot in WW2

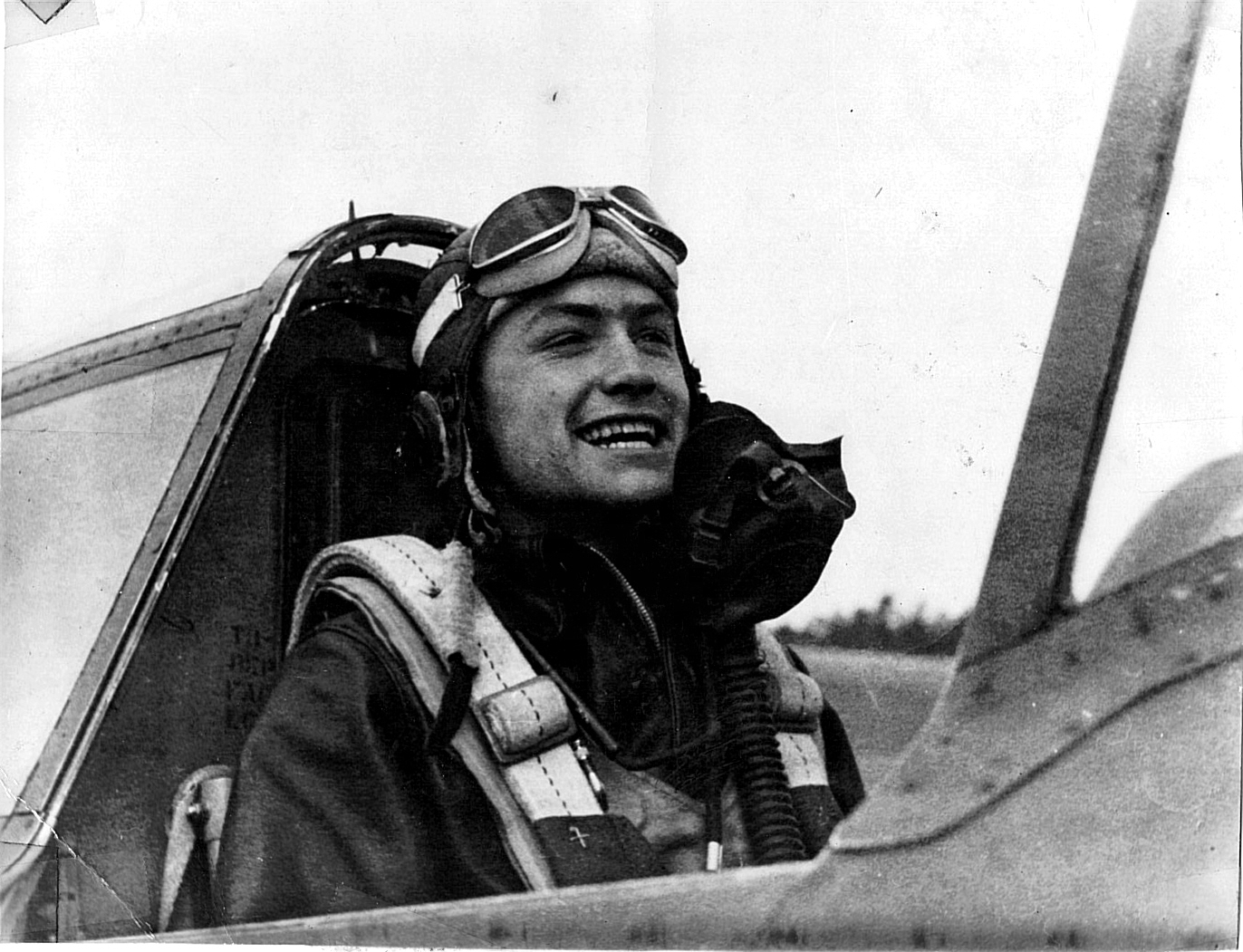
- Born: James Bell Dickson; January 19, 1923; Aberdeen, Mississippi
- Died: April 8, 1944 (aged 21); Haulerwijk, the Netherlands
- Resting place: Oddfellows Rest Cemetery, Aberdeen, MS Plot 65B
- Aviation career
- Air force: United States Army Air Force
- Rank: Captain (Promoted posthumously: 1944)

James Bell "Jim Bell" Dickson (January 19, 1923 - April 8, 1944), a native of Aberdeen, Mississippi, was a pilot in the U.S. Army Air Forces. James Bell Dickson was killed in action April 8, 1944, flying his Mustang fighter-plane P-51B, tail number 43-7147, YF-X.

Lt. Dickson was assigned to the 358th Squadron, 355th Fighter Group, 8th AAF Fighter Station at Steeple Morden, England. He was awarded the Distinguished Flying Cross which was pinned on by Colonel Jesse Anton of Covington, Kentucky.

On April 8, 1944, above and around Haulerwijk (the Netherlands) a heavy air battle arose between a number of German and American fighter planes. During the fight that unfolded an American aircraft went down. Either hit by enemy-fire or as a result of exposing the plane to too many G-forces, fact is that it disintegrated while still in the air. The pieces crashed into a stretch of farmland about 1 km. southeast of Haulerwijk. The pilot, James Bell Dickson, was found still strapped in his chair. Although initially showing some signs of life, he died almost immediately after the crash. Lt. Dickson's squadron was returning from an escort flight over Germany but got engaged in combat in the skies over occupied Holland with German fighter planes from (probably) station Leeuwarden. On April 11, 1944, James Bell Dickson was buried at the General Cemetery in Haulerwijk. After the war, he was reburied at the request of the family in the United States (Odd Fellows Rest Cemetery, Aberdeen, Mississippi, USA).

== Memoriam monuments ==
There is a monument in the Netherlands in memory of James Bell Dickson (and also Henri Pintaud, one of appr. 700 French paratroopers dropped in the environment of Haulerwijk in order to support the Canadian army in the liberation of northern Holland) at the Eikenhof Cemetery, Eikensingel 42, 8433 JK Haulerwijk, Ooststellingwerf, the Netherlands. James Bell Dickson is also mentioned on the Roll of Honour of the 355th War Memorial in Steeple Morden (UK).
