= James G. Dickson =

American mycologist

- Born: February 7, 1891
- Died: March 1, 1962 (aged 71)
- Alma mater: State College of Washington; University of Wisconsin System
- Employer: United States Department of Agriculture; University of Wisconsin System

James Geere Dickson (February 7, 1891, Yakima, Washington – March 1, 1962, Philippines) was an American mycologist.

Dickson did his undergraduate work at what is now Washington State University. He was a then a graduate student at the University of Wisconsin and later a professor there. Between graduation and his return to the University of Wisconsin he worked for the United States Department of Agriculture. He was an export on disease that infect crops, and wrote a widely used text book on this subject. He died in 1962 in a plane crash in the Philippines where he was acting as an agricultural consultant.
