= James Dickson (Swedish politician) =

Swedish politician, agronomist and chamberlain

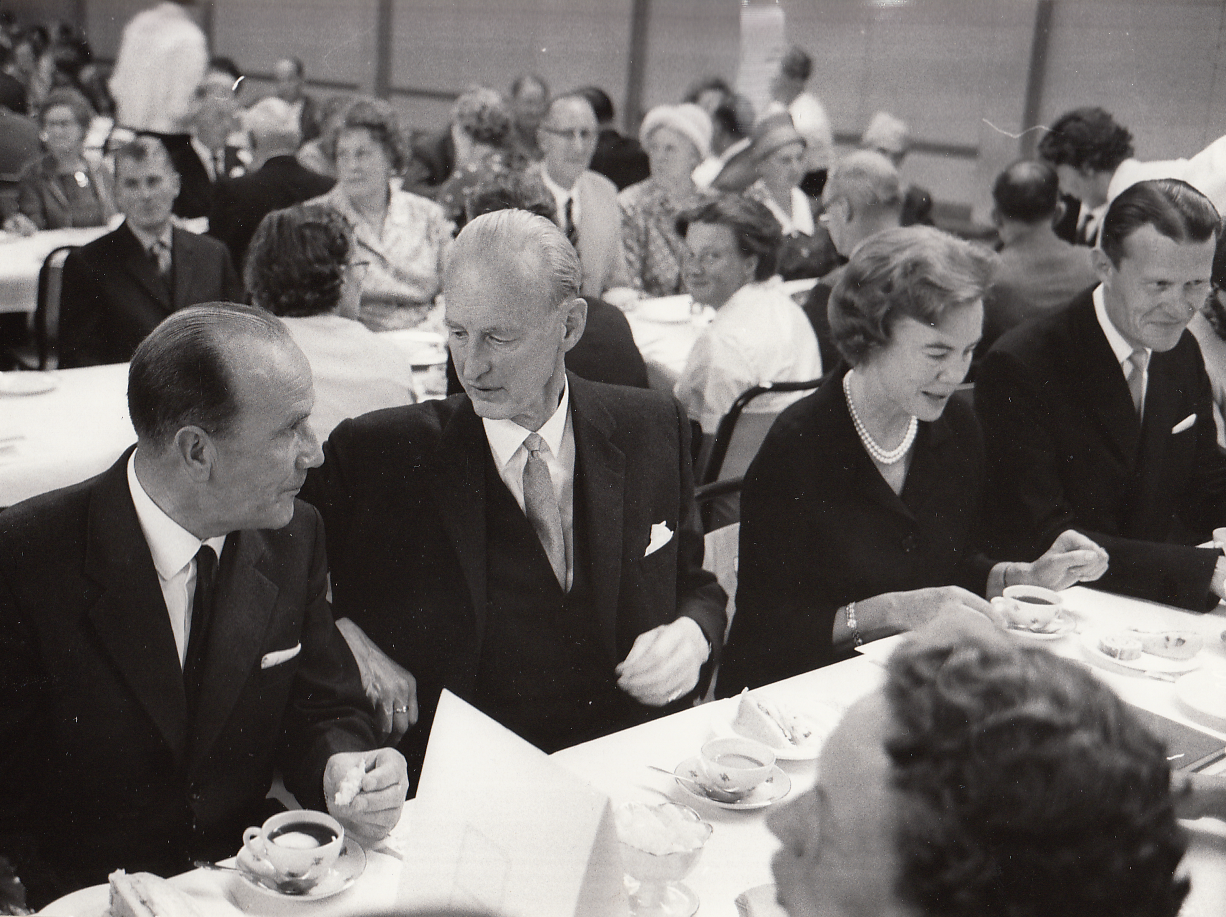
- Dickson, second from left, in Holmsund on 24 August 1963
- Born: James Iwan Axel Dickson; 18 March 1899; Gothenburg, Sweden
- Died: 6 March 1980 (aged 80); Alingsås, Sweden
- Occupations: Politician, agronomist, chamberlain
- Spouse: Vanja Bergh (m. 1923)
- Children: 4

James Iwan Axel Dickson (18 March 1899 – 6 March 1980) was a Swedish politician, agronomist and chamberlain.

== Early life ==
Dickson was born on 18 March 1899 in Gothenburg, Sweden, the son of Axel Dickson and his wife Nancy Bratt. He passed studentexamen at Lundsbergs boarding school in 1917 and gained an international flight certificate the same year. In 1920, Dickson was posted to the Swedish Army Air Force (Arméflyget). Three years later he graduated with a agronomist degree in Alnarp before making repeated trips to several European countries and to North America, Asia and Africa.

== Career ==
Dickson became a Valet de chambre in 1928 and captain of the landstorm in 1938 and he served as captain of the Finnish Army during the Winter War from 1939 to 1940. Back in Sweden, Dickson was appointed chamberlain in 1940 and he became conscript captain in 1944. He served in the landstorm from 1935 to 1938 and from 1943 to 1946 and from 1951. Dickson became captain of the reserve in 1948. During World War II, Dickson was also commander of the so called "D Group" of the C-byrån, the Swedish foreign intelligence service, responsible of the provinces of Jämtland and Härjedalen.

Dickson served as chairman of the Kommunalstämma from 1927 to 1951, of the municipal council from 1927 to 1939 and from 1944 to 1951, of the municipal board (Kommunalnämnd) from 1927 to 1939 and of the Kyrkostämman in 1940. He served as a member of a county council from 1935 to 1938, from 1943 to 1946 and from 1951 to 1966. Furthermore, Dickson was a member of the lower house of the Riksdag for The Right from 1941 to 1968 (Allmänna beredningsutskottet, Stadsrevisionen in 1966 for the Right wing party). He also served as an adviser in the Ministry of Communications in 1947 and in the Ministry of the Interior from 1948. He was a member of the Council of Europe from 1949 to 1956, a member of the 1947 Aviation Investigation (1947 års luftfartsutredning), of the National Public Baths Investigation (Statens folkbadsutredning) from 1948 to 1954 and of the 1954 års brandlagsrevision from 1954 to 1960. Dickson also served as member of the City Council (Stadsfullmäktige) from 1951 to 1958. Dickson also drew attention when he brought a grass snake as a pet into the Riksdag. He had taken care of the snake that his children found injured in the forest. The character "Snoke-Dicke" in the Barna Hedenhös book Barna Hedenhös blir kungliga (1954) is inspired by Dickson.

Dickson was president of Gothenburg's Rotary Club from 1939 to 1940. He was chairman of the Swedish Association of Conscript Officers (Värnpliktiga officerares riksförbund) from 1944 to 1947, of the Norra Älvsborgs högerförbund ("Northern Älvsborg's Moderate Association") from 1951 to 1965 (honorary chairman in 1965) and of the Sweden-Finland Society (Samfundet Sverige-Finland) from 1955 to 1959. Dickson was chairman of the board of the British Factory in Gothenburg from 1955 and of the AB Pripp & Lyckholm from 1956 to 1959.

== Personal life ==
In 1923 he married Vanja Bergh (1903–2004), the daughter of Martin Bergh and Anna Strokirk. Children: Maud (born 1924), Marianne (born 1926), Birgitta (born 1929) and Archibald (born 1933).

== Death ==
Dickson died on 6 March 1980 in Alingsås.

== Awards and decorations ==
=== Swedish ===
- (Sweden) King Gustaf V's Jubilee Commemorative Medal (1948)
- (Sweden) King Gustaf VI Adolf's Commemorative Medal (1968)
- (Sweden) Commander of the Order of the Polar Star (6 June 1963)
- (Sweden) Knight of the Order of Vasa (1949)
- (Sweden) Swedish Central Federation for Voluntary Military Training Medal of Merit in silver
- (Sweden) Royal Patriotic Society's Gold Medal
- (Sweden) Swedish Association of Conscript Officers' (Värnpliktiga officerares riksförbund) Gold Medal
- (Sweden) Älvsborgs landstormsförbunds silvermedalj
- (Sweden) Swedish Red Cross Medal of Merit
- (Sweden) Sports Badge in Gold

=== Foreign ===
- Commander of the Order of the White Rose of Finland
- (Norway) Commander of the Order of St. Olav (1953)
- Knight 1st Class of the Order of the Lion of Finland
- (Finland) 4th Class of the Order of the Cross of Liberty with Swords
- (Nazi Germany) 3rd Class of the Order of the German Eagle
- (Finland) Finnish commemorative medal Pro benignitate humana
- (Finland) Finnish War Memorial Medal with Clasp
- (Finland) Cross of Merit of the White Guard
- (Denmark) Danish Freedom Medal
- Norwegian medal for staff who participated in Norway's freedom struggle
