= James M. Dickson =

American politician

James M. Dickson, sometimes written as James M. Dixon, was a minister, farm owner, and state legislator in Mississippi. He was enslaved from birth. He represented Yazoo County in the Mississippi House of Representatives in 1872 and 1873. He also served as a chancery clerk and on the county school board.

He was enslaved from birth in North Carolina. He became a Methodist Episcopal Church minister and was living in Mississippi prior to the American Civil War. General Adelbert Ames appointed him to the Yazoo County Board of Supervisors in 1869. He testified before a congressional committee about the Democrat Party's campaign of violence and intimidation during the 1875 election in Mississippi (Redeemers).

== See also ==
- African American officeholders from the end of the Civil War until before 1900
