= Hugh Dickson (footballer, born 1899) =

Scottish footballer

Personal information
- Full name: Hugh McMillan Dickson
- Date of birth: 8 May 1899
- Place of birth: Bridgeton, Scotland
- Date of death: 1981
- Place of death: Rutherglen, Scotland
- Position: Left half

Senior career*
Years	Team	Apps	(Gls)
1921–1924	Queen's Park	88	(6)
- * Club domestic league appearances and goals

Hugh McMillan Dickson (8 May 1899 – 1981) was a Scottish amateur football left half who played in the Scottish League for Queen's Park.
