= Russell Dickson (footballer, born 1961) =

Australian rules footballer

Personal information
- Full name: Russell Dickson
- Born: 30 March 1961 (age 65)
- Original team: Assumption College
- Height: 185 cm (6 ft 1 in)
- Weight: 78 kg (172 lb)

Playing career^{1}
Years	Club	Games (Goals)
1981	Melbourne	4 (1)
- ^{1} Playing statistics correct to the end of 1981.

Russell Dickson (born 30 March 1961) is a former Australian rules footballer who played with Melbourne in the Victorian Football League (VFL).
