= Harlan Dickson =

US Navy officer (1914–1944)

Harlan Rockey Dickson
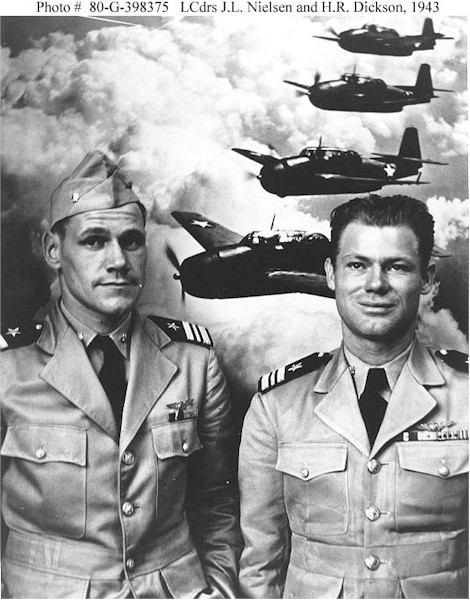
- Lieutenant Commander Harlan R. Dickson (right) with Lieutenant Commander John L. Nielsen, both members of U.S. Navy dive bomber Squadron 5 in the early months of World War II, at the Department of the Navy in Washington, D.C., c. July 1943.
- Born: September 16, 1914; Columbus, Ohio
- Died: February 5, 1944; Pacific Ocean off California
- Military career
- Allegiance: United States of America
- Branch: United States Navy
- Service years: ?-1944
- Rank: Lieutenant commander
- Unit: Dive bomber Squadron 5
- Conflicts: World War II; *Battle of the Coral Sea; *Battle of Midway
- Awards: Navy Cross (two awards)

Harlan Rockey Dickson (16 September 1914 – 5 February 1944) was a naval aviator in the United States Navy. He distinguished himself flying scout-bombers from the carrier USS Yorktown during the battles of Coral Sea and Midway, earning a Navy Cross and gold star for his contributions. Dickson was promoted to lieutenant commander and given command of Bombing Eighteen, a newly formed squadron still training stateside. Dickson, however, died in a flying accident while still stationed in California.

== Pre-War ==
Dickson was born on September 16, 1914, in Columbus, Ohio. His parents were Francis E. Dickson and Mildred Rockey Dickson.

In 1936, Dickson graduated from the United States Naval Academy in Annapolis, Maryland. The paragraph dedicated to him in the graduating year's Lucky Bag reads:

After spending his early years roaming the world, Dick finally decided to follow the profession of his forefathers, that of a seafaring fighter. Dick's battles with the academics has placed him among the intelligentsia of the upper ten-percent. His academic efforts have never been of prime importance, however; his chief interests have been getting enough sleep, fresh air, exercise, and the girl of his dreams. Dick has a deep-seated hatred of all that is artificial or unjust. His spirit rebels against oppression or unfairness in any form; give him a free hand, and the world will be a Utopia within a week. A sunny disposition and a willingness to do a favor or forget a grievance make Dixie an admirable companion and real friend.

== World War II ==
Harlan R. Dickson was promoted to the rank of lieutenant on 2 January 1942 and assigned to Bombing Squadron 5 (VB-5), attached to USS Yorktown (CV-5). He participated in the raid on a Japanese landing force in Tulagi in the Solomon Islands on 4 May 1942. Shortly thereafter, Dickson took an active role in attacking Japanese carriers on 7 and 8 May. For his tenacity in the face of considerable enemy AA and fighter protection, and for significant damaged dealt to Japanese warships, Dickson was awarded his first Navy Cross.

Despite damaged inflicted upon Yorktown during the Battle of Coral Sea, she was patched up enough to join the battle group in defense of Midway Atoll. With three Japanese flattops crippled on 4 June, search aircraft from Scouting Squadron 5 (re-designated VS-5 after Coral Sea) attempted to locate the final remaining carrier, Hiryū. Lt. Dickson flew wing for Lt. Samuel Adams and the pair spotted a task group consisting of the missing carrier, two battleships, four cruisers, and four destroyers. Despite being forced to fend off an attacking A6M Zeke in their slow Douglas SBDs, Lt. Adams radioed an incredibly accurate report on the Japanese whereabouts and aircraft from USS Enterprise razed the Hiryū. The damage was so severe she was ordered abandoned and eventually scuttled by destroyers. For his actions at the Battle of Midway, Lt. Dickson was awarded a gold star in lieu of a second Navy Cross. However, Yorktown did not survive long past the battle and Dickson would have to return to the States.

== Bombing Squadron Eighteen ==
Having been promoted to lieutenant commander, Harlan Dickson was given command Bombing Eighteen (VB-18). The squadron had been commissioned on 20 July 1943 with Lieutenant Commander Charles C. Gold as commander. On 27 November, Dickson took charge of squadron (Gold having been promoted and assigned elsewhere) and was tasked with continuing its training. His training schedule was relentless. Dickson stressed the importance of instrument flying, often having his crews fly training operations at night or in adverse weather conditions.

To facilitate the rapid improvement of the amateur flyers, Dickson had requested two of his old squadron mates, Lts. Leif Larsen and Benjamin Preston transferred to VB-18. Both men were decorated for actions earlier in the war and would prove to be valuable role models for the other men, as well as continuing to operate as effective combat pilots in their own right.

== Death ==
Naval Air Station Alameda requested VB-18 take part in a Marine practice landing assault in San Luis Obispo County and Lt. Comm. Dickson accepted, readily. On 5 February 1944, he led a section of bombers simulating an attack on a blockhouse using practice bombs filled with sand.

The formation approached the target from 15,000 ft. Standard practice had been to make a near-vertical dive from this altitude, releasing the payload at 3,000 ft., providing the aircraft with enough clearance to level off and disengage. However, all previous exercises had been at or near sea-level and the blockhouse was situated on a hill that was 1,700 ft. above sea-level.

Lt. Comm. Dickson led the formation in the dive and released his practice bomb, however; having not compensated for the target's location, struggled to avoid collision with the deck. The abrupt pullout caused his plane to experience a high-speed stall and roll over. At such an extreme low altitude it was impossible to recover from and Harlan Dickson's aircraft slammed into the ground. He died instantly.

== Recognition ==
Harlan Rockey Dickson was interred at Arlington National Cemetery.

On 17 December 1944, the Sumner-class destroyer USS Harlan R Dickson (DD-708) was launched in a ceremony attended by his mother, Mrs. Mildred Mae Studler. It was commissioned into the United States Navy on 17 February of the same year and served for twenty-seven years before it was stricken from the Navy record.
