= Robert Temple Dickson III =

American politician

Robert Temple Dickson III (29 October 1934 – 29 November 2006) was an American politician from Texas.

Robert Temple Dickson III was born to parents Mary Isabel and Robert Temple Dickson II on 29 October 1934. At the time, the family lived in Seymour, Texas, and later moved to Sweetwater. Dickson III attended the University of Texas at Austin and the University of Texas School of Law. A year before the couple married, Dickson's wife Kathy survived the sinking of the SS Andrea Doria. Outside of politics, Dickson was a rancher and practiced law.

Though he lived in Sweetwater throughout his tenure on the Texas House of Representatives, Dickson was continually redistricted, serving one two-year term each for districts 80, 72, and 63, between 1965 and 1971. He served a single four-year term in the Texas Senate for District 24 from 1989 to 1993. At the time, Senate District 24 encompassed the northern Colorado–Brazos River valley from Abilene to Temple. He was the last Democratic state senator to represent the geographic region, as the district's borders were redrawn and Dickson's immediate successor Frank L. Madla's district shared only some of the same area. Dickson died of lung cancer on 29 November 2006 at the age of 72.
