= Robert Dickson (physician) =

Scottish physician and botanist

- Born: 1804; Dumfries
- Died: 13 October 1875 (aged 70–71)
- Occupations: Physician and botanist

Robert Dickson (1804 – 13 October 1875) was a Scottish physician and botanist.

== Biography ==
Dickson was born at Dumfries in 1804, and educated at the high school and the university of Edinburgh, where he graduated M.D. in 1826. Having settled in London, he became a fellow of the Royal College of Physicians in 1855, and continued to practise there till 1866, when he retired to the country. He was an accomplished botanist, and lectured on botany at the medical school in Webb Street, and afterwards at St. George's Hospital. All the articles on ‘Materia Medica’ in the Penny Cyclopædia were by him, and he also published several articles on popular science in the ‘Church of England Magazine.’ He died on 13 October 1875. In 1834 he married Mary Ann Coope, who also died in 1875. There were six surviving children.
