= William Dickson (bishop) =

Anglican bishop in Ireland (1745–1804)

The Rt Rev William Dickson (1745–1804) was Bishop of Down and Connor from 1784 to 1804. He was educated at Eton and Hertford College, Oxford and died in post on 19 September 1804.

== Life ==
He was son of an English clergyman, James Dickson, who was dean of Down from 1768 till 1787. He was educated at Eton College, where he formed a lifelong friendship with Charles James Fox and several of Fox's nearest friends, one of whom, Lord Robert Spencer, became his executor. He entered Hertford College, Oxford, graduating B.A. 1767, M.A. 1770, and D.D. by diploma 1784.

Dickson was first chaplain to Robert Henley, 1st Earl of Northington, who became lord-lieutenant of Ireland 3 June 1783, and was promoted to the bishopric of Down and Connor by patent dated 12 December following. He was indebted to Fox for this rapid promotion, and Richard Mant says the news came in a letter to this effect: "I have ceased to be minister, and you are bishop of Down". Dickson was thus the official superior of his father, who was still dean of Down.

Dickson died at the house of his old friend Fox, in Arlington Street, London, 19 September 1804, and was buried in the cemetery of St. James's Chapel, Hampstead Road, where a monument was erected to his memory.

== Family ==
Dickson married a Miss Symmes, and by her had six children, of whom one son, John, was archdeacon of Down 1796–1814; another, William, prebendary of Rathsarkan or Rasharkin, in the diocese of Connor, 1800–50; and a third, Stephen, prebendary of Carncastle, in the same diocese, 1802–49.

== Notes ==
Attribution

This article incorporates text from a publication now in the public domain: "Dickson, William (1745-1804)". Dictionary of National Biography. London: Smith, Elder & Co. 1885–1900.

Church of Ireland titles
| Preceded by James Traill | Bishop of Down and Connor; 1784 –1804 | Succeeded by Nathaniel Alexander |
