= James Hill Dickson =

Northern Ireland unionist politician (1863–1938)

James Hill Dickson (6 August 1863 – 5 July 1938) was a unionist politician in Northern Ireland.

Dickson was a landowner and served as a county councillor for the Ulster Unionist Party. He was elected to the first Senate of Northern Ireland, and served until 1938. He was also a JP in the 20s

He was a prominent Down agriculturist, serving in the Country Down Committee of Agriculture, and a committee member of Listooder Ploughing Society from c. 1926 to c. 1936.
