= James Jameson Dickson =

Scottish-Swedish logging industrialist and philanthropist

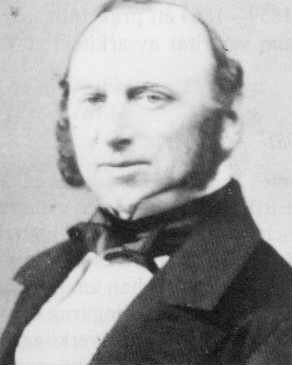
- Born: 17 September 1815; Gothenburg
- Died: 14 November 1885 (aged 70); Överås Örgryte
- Education: Uppsala University

James Jameson Dickson (17 September 1815 – 14 November 1885) was a Scottish Swedish logging industrialist and philanthropist.

== Life ==
Dickson was born in 1815 in Gothenburg. He was the son of James Dickson Sr. James Dickson Sr and his brother had established a timber export business that returned with British cotton goods to Sweden in exchange for the sawn timber. Dickson Jr was educated at Uppsala University. The Dickson business employed the largest merchant fleet in Sweden with offices in both Gothenburg and London.

Dickson and Oscar Dickson were credited with acts of philanthropy. The two of them helped the explorer Adolf Erik Nordenskiöld, local Gothenburg good causes and Artur Hazelius, who created Nordiska Museet.

Dickson died at his house, Överås Örgryte.
