= Whitfords Avenue =

Road in Perth, Western Australia

Whitfords Avenue Western Australia
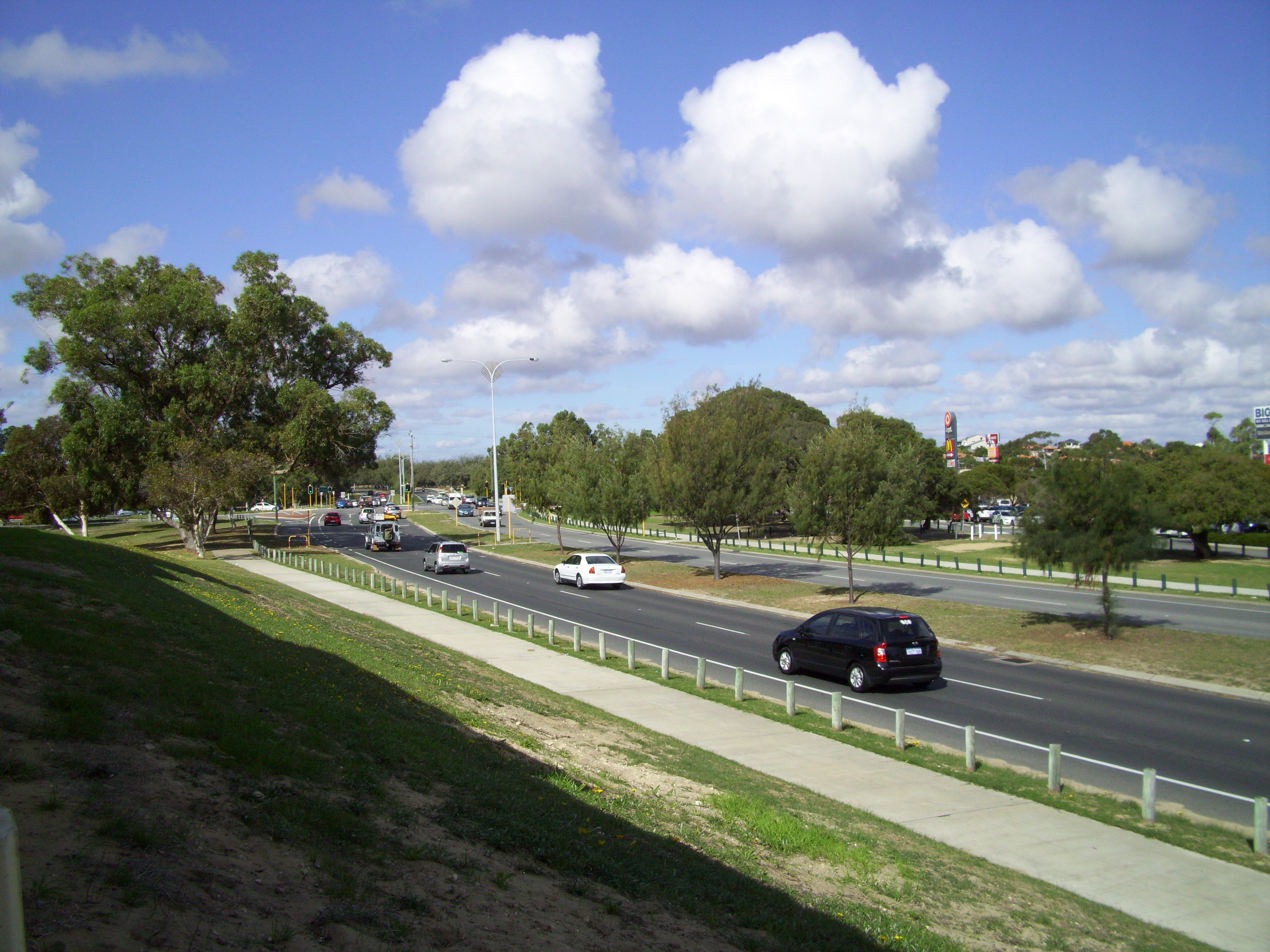
- View eastbound approaching Marmion Avenue

General information
- Type: Road
- Length: 10 km (6.2 mi)
- Opened: 1970s
- Route number(s): State Route 83 (Marmion Avenue to Wanneroo Road)
- Tourist routes: Tourist Drive 204 (West Coast Drive to Northshore Drive)

Major junctions
- Southwest end: West Coast Drive (Tourist Drive 204), Hillarys
- Northshore Drive (Tourist Drive 204); Marmion Avenue (State Route 71); Mitchell Freeway (State Route 2)
- Northeast end: Wanneroo Road (State Route 60 / State Route 83), Woodvale

Location(s)
- Major suburbs: Kallaroo, Craigie, Padbury, Woodvale, Kingsley

Whitfords Avenue is an arterial east–west road located in the northern suburbs of Perth, Western Australia.

== Route description ==
Whitfords Avenue is allocated State Route 83 east of Marmion Avenue, and Tourist Drive 204 (Sunset Coast Tourist Drive) between West Coast Drive and Northshore Drive. It is a four lane dual carriageway east of Northshore Drive, as well as between Hepburn Avenue and Northside Drive/Tenerife Boulevard, and is a two lane single carriageway in the remaining stretch between, though there is a section between the Pinnaroo Point entrance road and Flinders Avenue that is a two lane divided carriageway.

Whitfords Avenue commences at a roundabout, with the entrance to the Hillarys Boat Harbour to the west, Hepburn Avenue to the east, and West Coast Drive to the south. The road starts off as a four-lane dual carriageway, with the northern section of Hillarys Boat Harbour to the west and residential development to the east, reaching Northside Drive and Tenerife Boulevard 230 metres (750 ft) later, after which it promptly reduces to a two-lane single carriageway. Travelling parallel to the coast, it becomes a two-lane divided carriageway at Flinders Avenue 1.6 kilometres (0.99 mi), which runs for 500 metres (1,600 ft), before reducing to a single carriageway again at the Pinnaroo Point entrance road. It meets Northshore Drive 650 metres (2,130 ft) later; Tourist Drive 204 turns left onto Northshore Drive. At this point, Whitford Avenue bends to the east and reverts to a four-lane dual carriageway. Whitfords Avenue then runs along Kallaroo and Hillarys, within the Whitford Satellite City development, for 2.1 kilometres (1.3 mi), passing through the Westfield Whitford City shopping centre between Endeavour Road and Marmion Avenue.

After Marmion Avenue, Whitfords Avenue gains the State Route 83 allocation and is now bordering Craigie and Padbury, which it does so for 2.8 kilometres (1.7 mi) before reaching the Mitchell Freeway. Along that stretch it passes the Craigie Open Space near the freeway. At the interchange with the freeway, the southbound ramp provides access to Whitfords railway station on the Yanchep line. The road then travels for 3.5 kilometres (2.2 mi) through the suburbs of Woodvale and Kingsley, and the Yellagonga Regional Park before terminating at Wanneroo Road at a traffic light controlled T-junction. State Route 83 turns right to travel south for a short distance to Gnangara Road.

== History ==
Whitfords Avenue took its name from the Whitford Satellite City development through which it was built in the 1970s, which was later split into the suburbs of Hillarys, Padbury, Kallaroo and Craigie.

In 1985, the part of West Coast Highway between Hepburn Avenue and Whitfords Avenue was renamed to its present-day name, as Marmion Avenue was replacing West Coast Highway as the main route for Perth's northern coastal suburbs. In 1986, the road was assigned State Route 83, and it became an entrance to the Mitchell Freeway upon its extension to Ocean Reef Road in 1988. From the late-1980s to the mid-1990s, Whitfords Avenue east of Marmion Avenue was progressively duplicated; first to Mitchell Freeway, and then to Wanneroo Road, and then the section west of Marmion Avenue within the vicinity of Westfield Whitford City. The remaining section between Endeavour Road and Northshore Drive was duplicated during 2015 and 2016, and a short section alongside the coast was upgraded to a two-lane divided carriageway during 2017.

== Major intersections ==
LGA	Location	km	mi	Destinations	Notes
Joondalup	Hillarys–Sorrento boundary	0.0	0.0	Hepburn Avenue (State Route 82) – Padbury, Ballajura, Trigg, Hillarys Boat Harbour	Southwestern terminus. Continues as West Coast Drive(Tourist Drive 204) south. Roundabout
Joondalup	Hillarys	0.3	0.19	Northside Drive west / Tenerife Boulevard east – Hillarys Boat Harbour	Roundabout
Joondalup	Hillarys	0.8	0.50	Angove Drive	Roundabout
Joondalup	Hillarys	1.8	1.1	Flinders Avenue	Roundabout
Joondalup	Hillarys	2.3	1.4	John Wilkie Tarn	Roundabout
Joondalup	Kallaroo–Hillarys boundary	3.0	1.9	Northshore Drive – Mullaloo, Ocean Reef, Burns Beach,	Roundabout. Tourist Route 204 (Sunset Coast Tourist Drive) northern concurrency terminus
Joondalup	Kallaroo–Hillarys boundary	3.4	2.1	Cumberland Drive	Roundabout
Joondalup	Kallaroo–Hillarys boundary	3.9	2.4	Belrose Entrance	Roundabout
Joondalup	Kallaroo–Hillarys boundary	4.2	2.6	Endeavour Road – Westfield Whitford City	Signalised intersection
Joondalup	Kallaroo–Hillarys boundary	4.5	2.8	Dampier Avenue – Mullaloo, Westfield Whitford City	Signalised intersection
Joondalup	Kallaroo–Craigie–Padbury–Hillarys quadripoint	5.0	3.1	Marmion Avenue (State Route 71) – Yanchep, Clarkson, Carine, Scarborough	Signalised intersection
Joondalup	Craigie–Padbury boundary	6.2	3.9	Eddystone Avenue – Beldon, Edgewater	Signalised intersection
Joondalup	Craigie–Padbury boundary	6.9	4.3	Gibson Avenue, Padbury	Signalised intersection
Joondalup	Craigie–Woodvale–Kingsley–Padbury quadripoint	7.8– 8.1	4.8– 5.0	Mitchell Freeway (State Route 2) – Butler, Joondalup, Stirling, Perth	Signalised diamond interchange favouring Mitchell Freeway. Access to Whitfords railway station.
Joondalup	Woodvale–Kingsley boundary	8.6	5.3	Kingsley Drive	Signalised intersection
Joondalup	Woodvale–Kingsley boundary	9.3	5.8	Trappers Drive	Signalised intersection. Access to Woodvale Boulevard shopping centre.
Joondalup	Woodvale–Kingsley boundary	9.6	6.0	Barridale Drive	Unsignalised intersection
Joondalup	Woodvale–Kingsley boundary	10.1	6.3	Moolanda Boulevard	Unsignalised intersection
Joondalup	Woodvale–Kingsley boundary	10.4	6.5	Duffy Terrace	Unsignalised intersection
Joondalup–Wanneroo boundary	Woodvale–Wangara–Madeley–Kingsley quadripoint	11.4	7.1	Wanneroo Road (State Route 60 / State Route 83 south) – Lancelin, Wanneroo, Balcatta, Perth	Eastern terminus at signalised T-junction
Concurrency terminus
