= Whitford Development Scheme =

Coordinates: 31°47′45″S 115°45′14″E

Whitford (or Whitfords) is a metropolitan area north of Perth, that loosely comprises four suburbs: Hillarys, Kallaroo, Craigie and Padbury. Whitford is not in itself a 'suburb', though Hillarys, Kallaroo, Craigie and Padbury share the same postcode of 6025. Whitford was also the former electorate name of this area. The seat was renamed Hillarys at the 1996 election.

The 'centre' of the Whitford area could be seen as the main road intersection of the east–west Whitfords Avenue (Route 83) and the north–south Marmion Avenue (Route 71). Many businesses and locations (shops, schools, churches etc.) in the surrounding suburbs use either 'Whitford' or 'Whitfords' in its name. Some examples include Westfield Whitford City (formerly Whitford City Shopping Centre), Whitford Catholic Primary School, Whitford Church, and Whitfords railway station.
