= Whitford (surname) =

Whitford is a surname. Notable people with the surname include:

- Albert Whitford (astronomer) (1905–2002), American astronomer
- Albert Whitford (politician) (1877–1924), Australian politician
- Brad Whitford (born 1952), American musician
- Bradley Whitford (born 1959), American actor
- Peter Whitford (born 1939), Australian actor
- Philippa Whitford (born 1958), Scottish politician and surgeon
- Stanley Whitford (1878–1959), Australian politician
- Tony Whitford (1941–2024), Canadian politician
- Walter Whitford (c. 1581–1647), Scottish minister, prelate and Royalist

== See also ==
- Whiteford (surname)
- Whitford (disambiguation)
