= Whiteford Township =

Whiteford Township may refer to the following places:

- Whiteford Township, Monroe County, Michigan
- Whiteford Township, Marshall County, Minnesota

See also

- Whiteford (disambiguation)
