= Kallaroo, Western Australia =

Kallaroo
- Suburb
- Interactive map of Kallaroo
- Coordinates: 31.789°S 115.739°E
- Country: Australia
- State: Western Australia
- City: Perth
- LGA: City of Joondalup
- Location: 26 km (16 mi) NNW of Perth

Government
  - State electorate: Hillarys
  - Federal division: Moore

Population
  - Total: 5,305 (SAL 2021)
- Postcode: 6025
Suburbs around Kallaroo
	Mullaloo	Beldon
Indian Ocean	Kallaroo	Craigie
	Hillarys	Padbury

Kallaroo is one of the four 'Whitfords' suburbs in Perth that resulted from the Western Australian Government rezoning large areas of coastal land for development in 1969.

Kallaroo was chosen as a suburb name in 1970 and is an Aboriginal word meaning ‘road to the water’. The suburb is home to one primary school, Springfield Primary School, which was named after the original housing estate. The school was established in 1972, with four demountable classrooms and 179 students. A permanent school was built for the 1973 educational year with six classrooms in the main building. Also in the construction was an administrative and library buildings. The new school oval was sand and limestone rocks for the first year and after many student injuries, a new grassed oval was ready for the 1974 educational year. Street names in the Kallaroo are predominantly after shipwrecks, including famous West Australian shipwrecks, such as the Batavia.

The land west of Dampier Avenue was developed during the mid-late 1980s and, although part of Kallaroo, is known as Northshore, in reference to the project name of the housing estate.

In late 2024, Springfield Primary School began work on its $19.4 million redevelopment which will see new state of the art facilities, classrooms and education spaces. The project is slated for completion in 2028, with the school operating as normal during this work.

== Transport ==
The suburb is connected by 4 different bus routes. These are

- 460: Whitfords Station to Joondalup Station via Northshore Drive
- 461: Whitfords Station to Joondalup Station via Dampier Avenue
- 462: Whitfords Station to Joondalup Station via Bridgewater Drive
- 463: Whitfords Station to Joondalup Station via Marmion Avenue

The Coastal shared path also runs through the suburb, along the beach from Whitfords Avenue to Mullaloo Dive.

== Facilities ==
The suburb is limited in its facilities offered, with neighboring Hillarys home to the Whitfords Shopping Centre. There is the St Ives Retirement Village along Dampier Ave, and a small set of shops along Bridgewater Drive, near Bridgewater Park.
