= Whitford =

Whitford may refer to:

== Places ==
- Electoral district of Whitford, Western Australia
- Westfield Whitford City, shopping centre in Perth, Western Australia
- Whitford, Alberta, Canada
  - Whitford (provincial electoral district)
- Whitford, Devon, England
- Whitford, Flintshire, Wales
- Whitford, New Zealand
- Whitford, Pennsylvania
- Whitford station, railway station in Exton, Pennsylvania, US

== See also ==
- Whiteford (disambiguation)
