= Padbury, Western Australia =

Padbury
- Suburb
- Interactive map of Padbury
- Coordinates: 31.808°S 115.769°E
- Country: Australia
- State: Western Australia
- City: Perth
- LGA: City of Joondalup
- Location: 23 km (14 mi) NNW of Perth

Government
  - State electorate: Hillarys, Carine
  - Federal division: Moore

Population
  - Total: 8,626 (SAL 2021)
- Postcode: 6025
Suburbs around Padbury
Kallaroo	Craigie	Woodvale
Hillarys	Padbury	Kingsley
Sorrento	Duncraig	Greenwood

Padbury is a suburb of Perth, Western Australia, located within the City of Joondalup. Its postcode is 6025. The suburb was named in 1971 after the notable Western Australian settler Walter Padbury. (A street in Padbury is also named after Walter Padbury, Walter Padbury Boulevard.) Several locations in the north section of Padbury bordering Whitfords Avenue take on the name Whitfords. The south east corner of the suburb also goes by the name of Hepburn Heights, and the most eastern part of Padbury is often called Pinnaroo Heights. Padburys population in 2021 was 8,626.

== Education ==
Padbury contained one high school, Padbury Senior High School, which closed in 2011, and four primary schools: Padbury Primary School, Bambara Primary School, South Padbury Primary School and Padbury Catholic Primary School.
