= Whiteford =

Whiteford may refer to:

== Places ==
United Kingdom

- Whiteford House, Cornwall
- Whiteford Sands, Wales
  - Whiteford Lighthouse
  - Whiteford National Nature Reserve
- Whiteford, a hamlet in Aberdeenshire, Scotland

United States

- Whiteford (Price) Archeological Site, Kansas
- Whiteford, Maryland
- Whiteford Township, Michigan
  - Whiteford Agricultural Schools

== Other uses ==
- Whiteford (surname)
- Whitford (disambiguation)
