= Craigie, Western Australia =

Craigie Perth, Western Australia
- Coordinates: 31.787°S 115.768°E
- Population: 6,456 (SAL 2021)
- Established: 1970s
- Postcode(s): 6025
- Area: 4.6 km^{2} (1.8 sq mi)
- Location: 23 km (14 mi) NNW of Perth CBD
- LGA(s): City of Joondalup
- State electorate(s): Hillarys
- Federal division(s): Moore
Suburbs around Craigie:
Mullaloo	Beldon	Woodvale
Kallaroo	Craigie	Woodvale
Hillarys	Padbury	Kingsley

Craigie is a northern suburb of Perth. Craigie was chosen as a suburb name in 1970 and honours an early councillor of the City of Wanneroo who did work in developing the City. Craigie is one of the four "Whitfords" suburbs that resulted from the State Government rezoning a large area of coastal land for development in 1969.

The suburb once had a senior high school, Craigie Senior High School, which was opened in 1976 only to be closed again in 2003 following a decline in student enrolments. Students were shifted into Padbury Senior High School or Belridge Senior High School. Padbury itself closed in 2011.

== Transport ==
=== Bus ===
- 463 Whitfords Station to Joondalup Station – serves Whitfords Avenue, Marmion Avenue, Coral Street, Camberwarra Drive and Craigie Drive
- 464 Whitfords Station to Joondalup Station – serves Whitfords Avenue, Eddystone Avenue and Craigie Drive

Bus routes serving Whitfords Avenue:

- 441, 442, 443 and 444 Whitfords Station to Warwick Station
- 460, 461 and 462 Whitfords Station to Joondalup Station
