= Whiteford (surname) =

Whiteford is a surname. Notable people with the surname include:

- Andy Whiteford (born 1977), Scottish footballer and manager
- Blackie Whiteford (1889–1962), American actor
- Derek Whiteford (born 1947), Scottish footballer and manager
- Doug Whiteford (died 1979), Australian racing driver
- Eilidh Whiteford (born 1969), Scottish politician
- Hugh C. Whiteford, American politician
- Joseph S. Whiteford (politician) (1859–1923), American politician from Maryland
- Kate Whiteford (born 1952), Scottish artist
- Peter Whiteford (born 1980), Scottish golfer
- Robert Whiteford, Scottish mixed martial artist
- Samuel M. Whiteford (1809–1889), American politician
- William Whiteford, American politician
- William M. Whiteford (died 1936), American politician

== See also ==
- Whitford (surname)
