= Westfield Whitford City =

Shopping centre in Perth, Western Australia

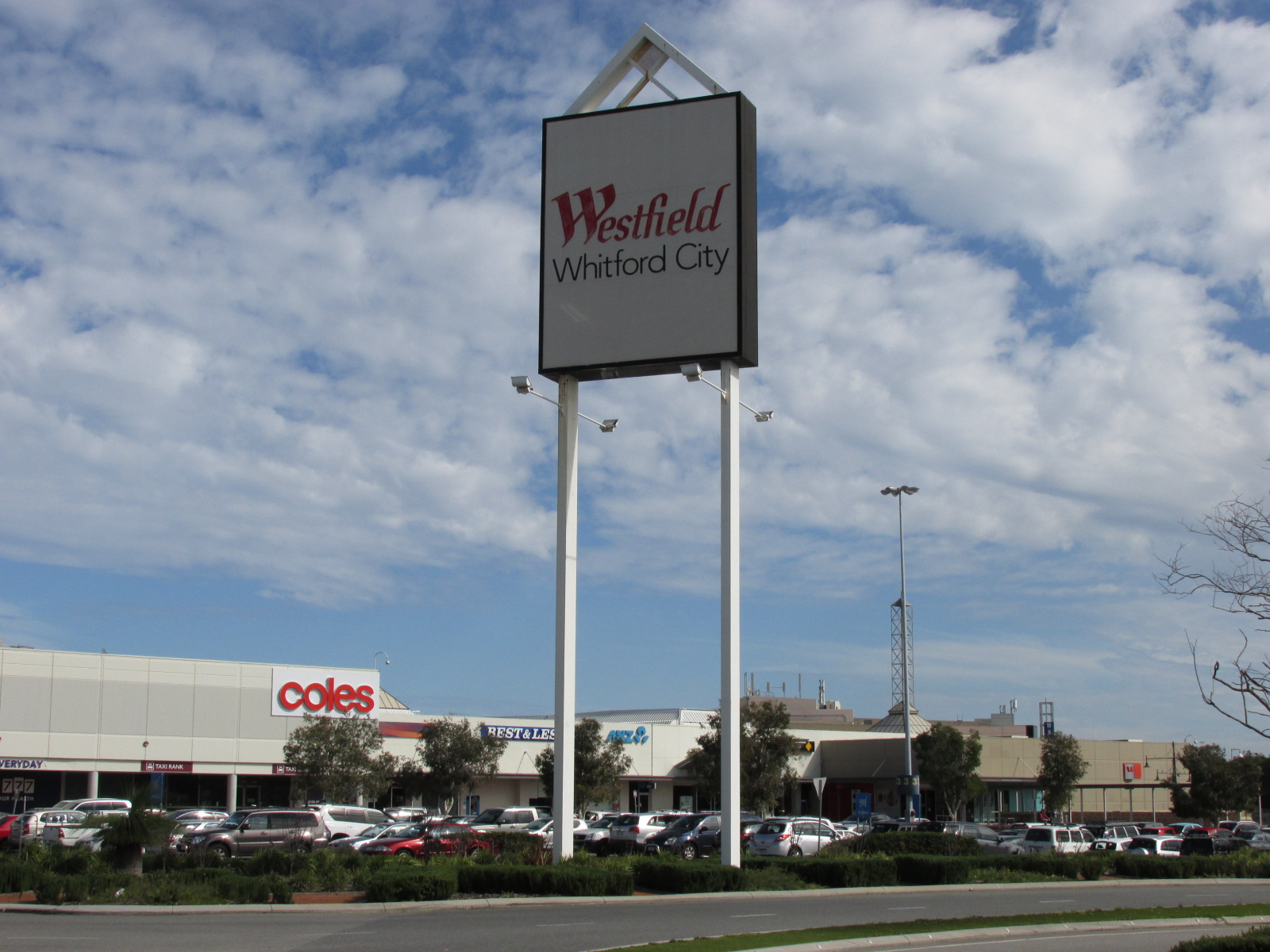
- Westfield Whitford City sign in front of the northern end of the centre
- Location: Hillarys, Perth, Western Australia
- Coordinates: 31°47′47″S 115°44′58″E
- Opened: 21 March 1978
- Previous names: Whitford City Shopping Centre
- Manager: Scentre Group
- Owner: Scentre Group (50%); JY Group (50%)
- Num. of stores: 280
- Num. of anchor tenants: 6
- Floor area: 84,759 m^{2} (912,340 sq ft)
- Floors: 2
- Parking: 4107
- Website: Official website

Westfield Whitford City, formerly Whitford City Shopping Centre, is a major shopping centre in Hillarys, east of St Mark's Anglican Community School in Perth, Western Australia. Built in 1977 on the former Red Cattle Ridge site at Marmion Avenue approximately 18 kilometres (11 miles) north of the Perth central business district, the centre is owned by the Scentre Group.

In 2023, the shopping centre had a turnover of $513 million, up from $395 million in 2006, with approximately 7.2 million customer visits yearly. The trade-area population surrounding the shopping location is about 224,410 and the total retail spending in that area is $2.3 billion.

== History ==
Whitford City opened on 21 March 1978 and had an Aherns department store until 1985, one of Western Australia's first Big W discount department stores, a Woolworths supermarket, and 50 specialty stores. The centre cost $16 million and had a floor area of 22,307 square metres (240,110 sq ft). The centre also had outdoor facilities and a library, and a petrol station was built near the centre shortly after the opening.

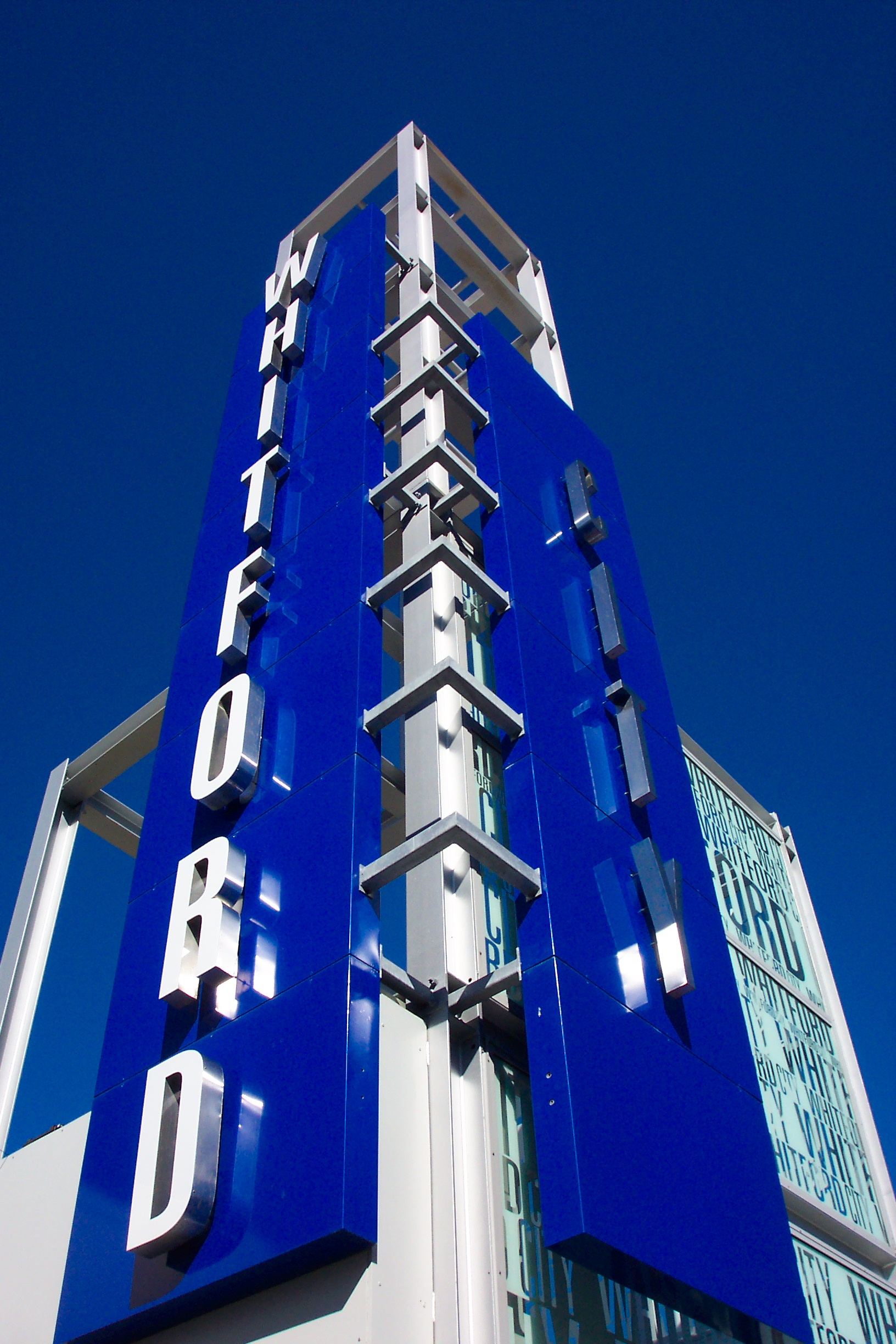
Whitford City 2005 - View of Entry Pylon

In August 2004, Dexus sold a 50% shareholding to Westfield Corporation. In December 2009, Dexus sold its remaining 50% to GIC. In September 2024, GIC sold its stake to JY Group.

Whitford City is currently Perth's largest shopping centre without a flagship department store such as Myer or David Jones. The shopping centre has officially been part of the Westfield Group since 2004 and is currently home to over 240 speciality stores. In July 2014, the Westfield Group became two companies (Scentre Group and Westfield Corporation), with ownership and management transferring to Scentre Group.

In 2024, minority owner GIC sold their stake in the centre to JY Group for $195 million, with Scentre Group passing up the opportunity to take full control of the centre.

=== 1989–1990 ===
In 1985, works were approved for a new redevelopment to the centre to increase the size to 39,447 square metres (424,600 sq ft). This new redevelopment was set to include a relocated Woolworths supermarket, and a new Food Court featuring a McDonald's. The addition of the new food court however, would cause the Aherns department store to be demolished. Since then, Westfield Whitford City has not had a department store such as Myer or David Jones. The redevelopment was completed by 1990.

=== 1991–1993 ===
Shortly after completion of the previous redevelopment, another redevelopment was approved that increased the floor area of the complex to 52,517 square metres (565,290 sq ft). The new redevelopment included a new Target discount department store, expanded the west side of the mall featuring over 40 specialty stores, and the existing mall was renovated including Big W.

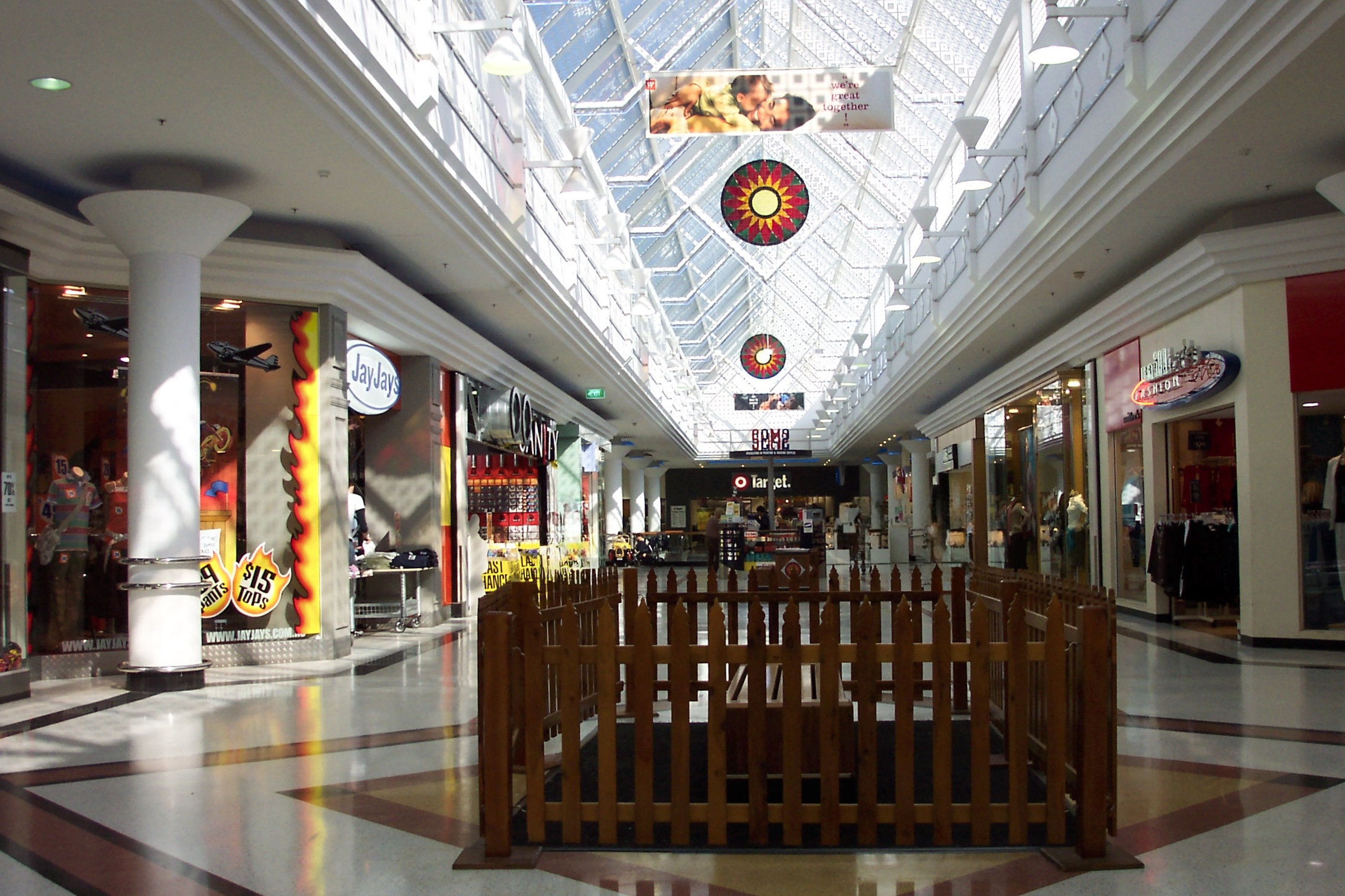
Whitford City Target Mall

In 1993, two new fast food restaurants, a Hungry Jack's and a KFC, were built outside the centre, completing the redevelopment.

=== 1992–1996 ===
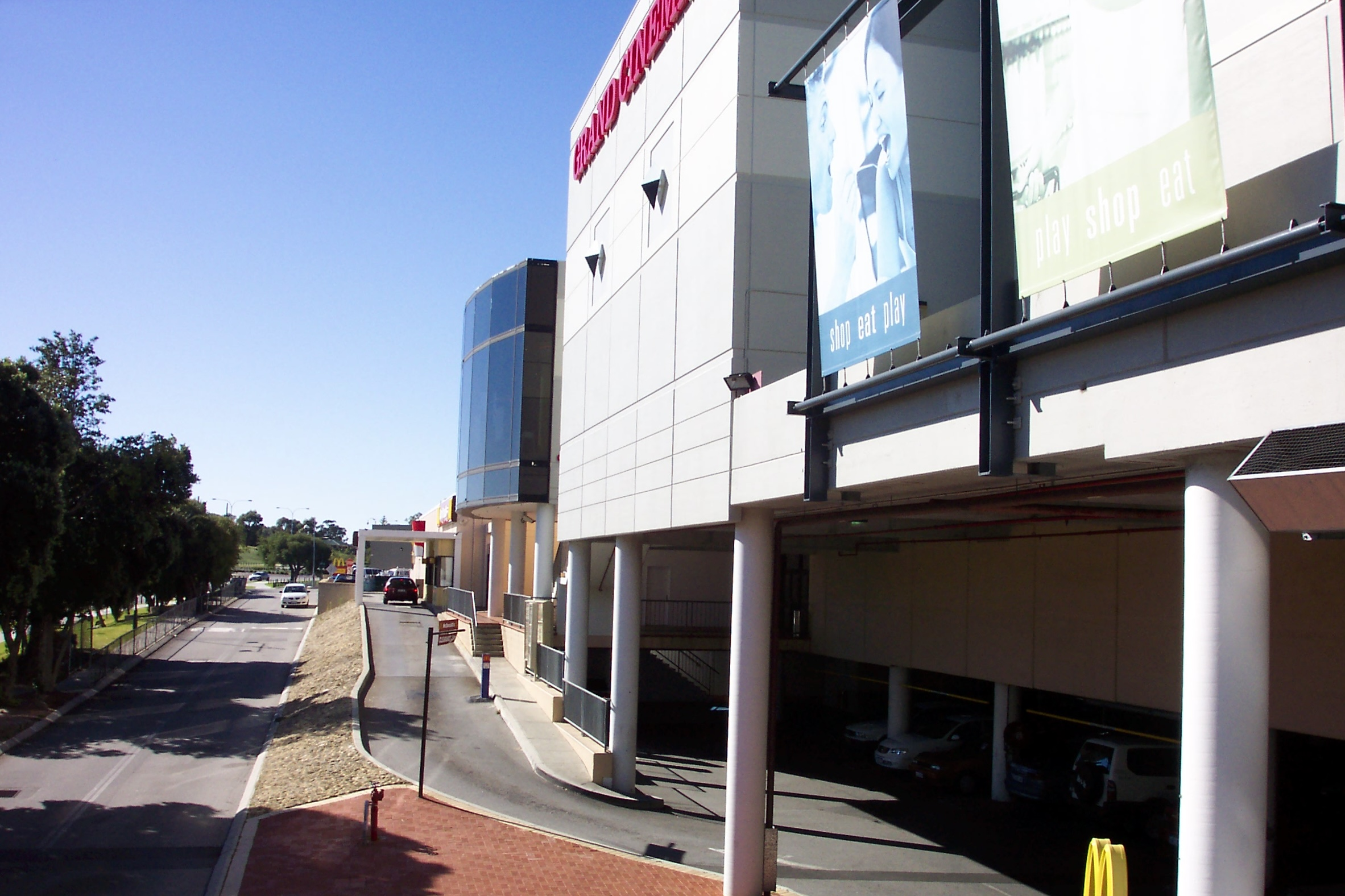
Greater Union Complex overlooking McDonalds Drive Thru

In 1992, construction of a six screen cinema complex was approved. The redevelopment was completed in 1996 which included a Greater Union Cinemas, an Intencity arcade and a Lone Star Steakhouse & Saloon. The Greater Union occupied the second floor beside the Food Court.

=== 2001–2004 ===
In 2001, redevelopment was approved that increased the floor area of the centre to 76,463 square metres (823,040 sq ft). The $80 million redevelopment included the following.

- A new mall to the upper-west side of the centre.
- A relocated Woolworths supermarket.
- A new Fresh Food Market.
- A new A Mart All Sports (later Rebel) and Best & Less mini-major store.
- Expanded parking, and fast food restaurants.
- Renovations to much of the existing mall.
- A new outdoor dining area named the "Piazza" that featured a view onto Whitfords Avenue.

Upon completion of the redevelopment, Greater Union sub-let their cinema in the centre to Grand Cinemas in 2004, and Whitford City was sold to Westfield which rebranded the centre to Westfield Whitford City and overhauled signage and entrances.

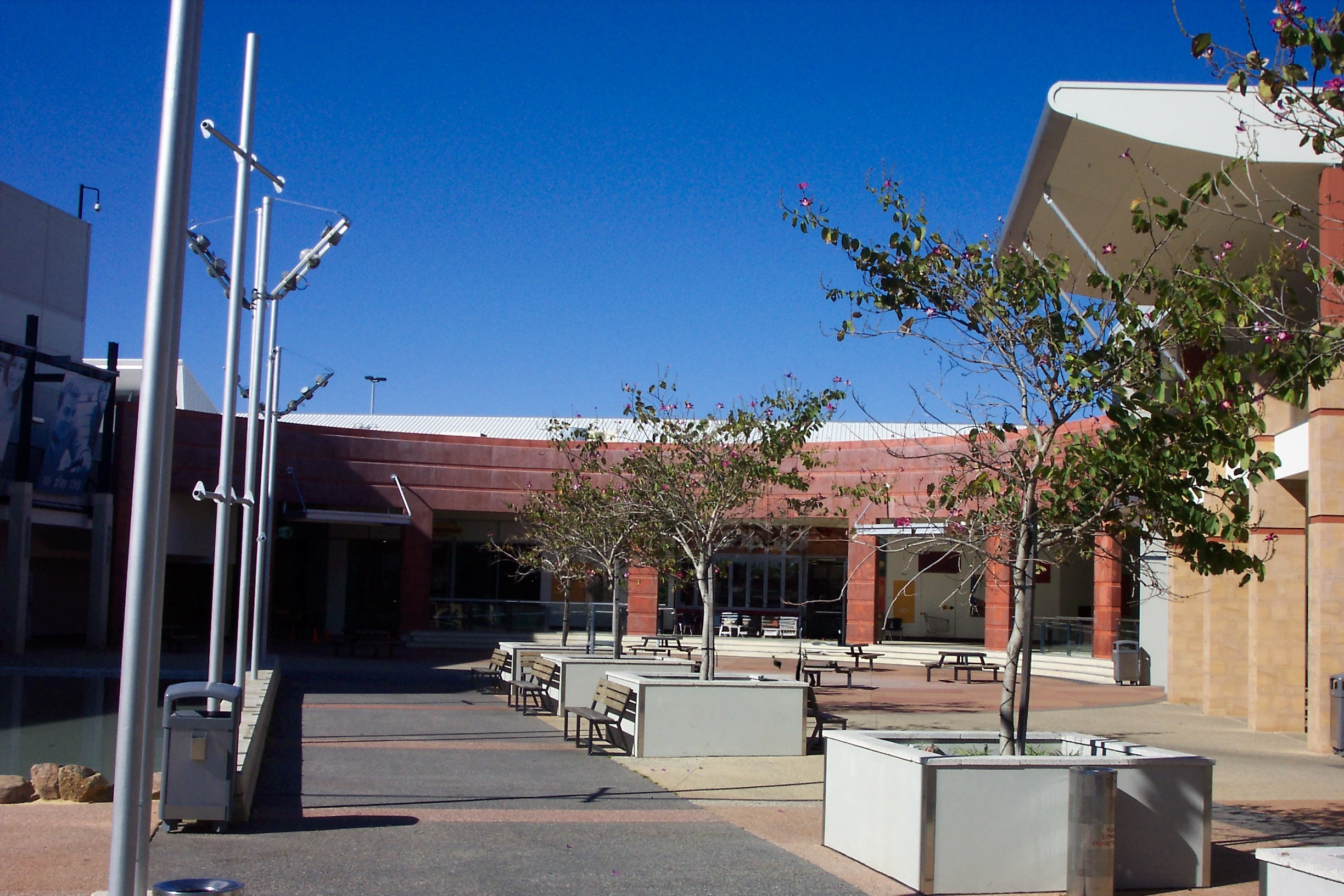
The Piazza was never fully leased and subsequently redeveloped.

=== 2005–2015 ===
In 2006 the centre's adjoining business centre was refurbished.

During 2006 and 2007 the centre ran the Westfield Shop for your School promotion.

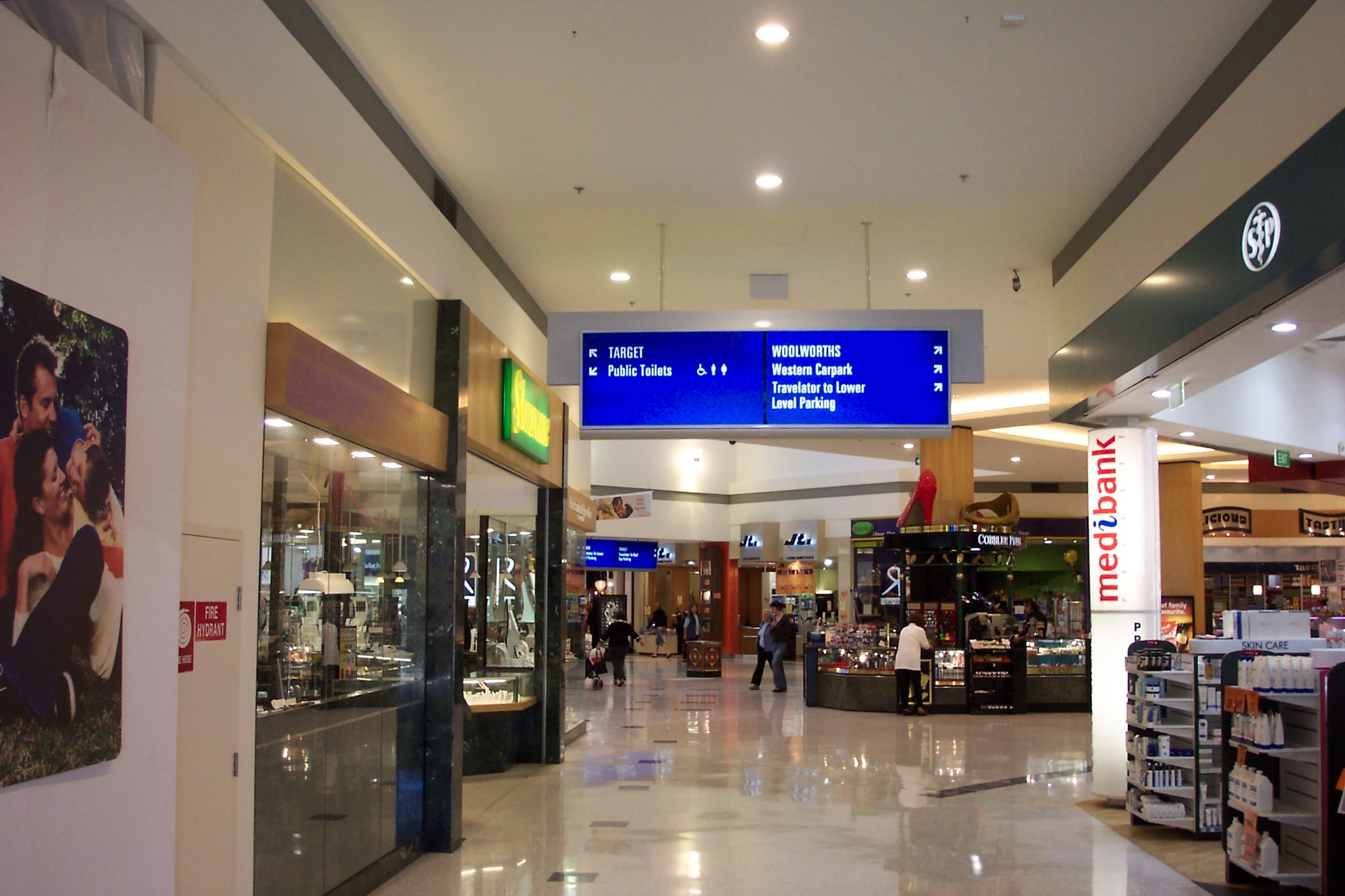
Woolworths Mall view from Piazza entry in 2005

Westfield refurbished the Food Forum with new furnishings and rebranded it as the Food Court.

=== 2016–2017 ===
On 8 July 2016 Scentre Group announced an $80 million redevelopment that focused on the outdoor Piazza and included the following.

- A complete demolishing of the existing Piazza and cinema complex.
- A new 8-screen Event Cinemas complex featuring two "V-Max" and "Gold Class" screens.
- 12 new dining restaurants including the first micro-brewery in Western Australia, The Whitfords Brewing Company.
- A new iPlay located in the basement floor featuring an arcade and bowling alley.
- A relocated Rebel near the Food Court.
- An overhauled Fresh Food Market with a renovated Woolworths supermarket.

The redevelopment opened on 20 September 2017, increasing the floor area of the complex to 84,759 square metres (912,340 sq ft), making it the third largest shopping centre in the northern side of Perth, behind Lakeside Joondalup and Karrinyup Shopping Centre.

== Transport ==
The centre is bounded by the major roads of Marmion Avenue and Whitfords Avenue in Hillarys. Multiple Transperth bus routes service the centre. 441, 460, 461 and 462 run along Whitfords Ave, while 442 runs along Marmion Ave on the eastern side of the precinct. All routes connect to Whitfords railway station and Joondalup railway station.

== Future ==
The centre has development approval for about 90 apartments and an office block, however no development has begun yet.

Provisions for an expanded centre, including a David Jones Major, has been in development for multiple years, with no set construction date.

== Gallery ==
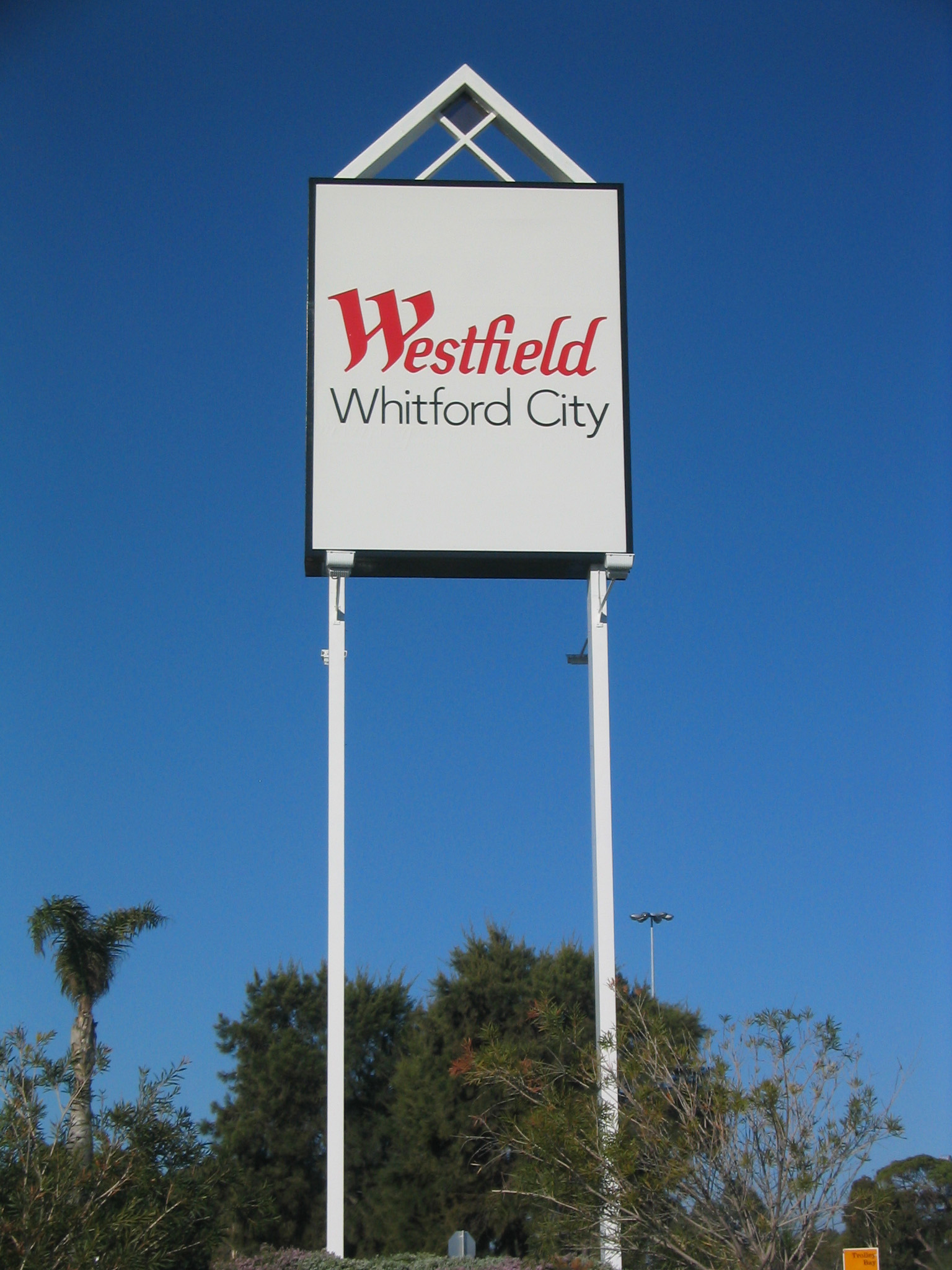
The main pylon sign of Westfield Whitford City. It is a vinyl wrapped, reskinned version of the 1995-2004 sign.

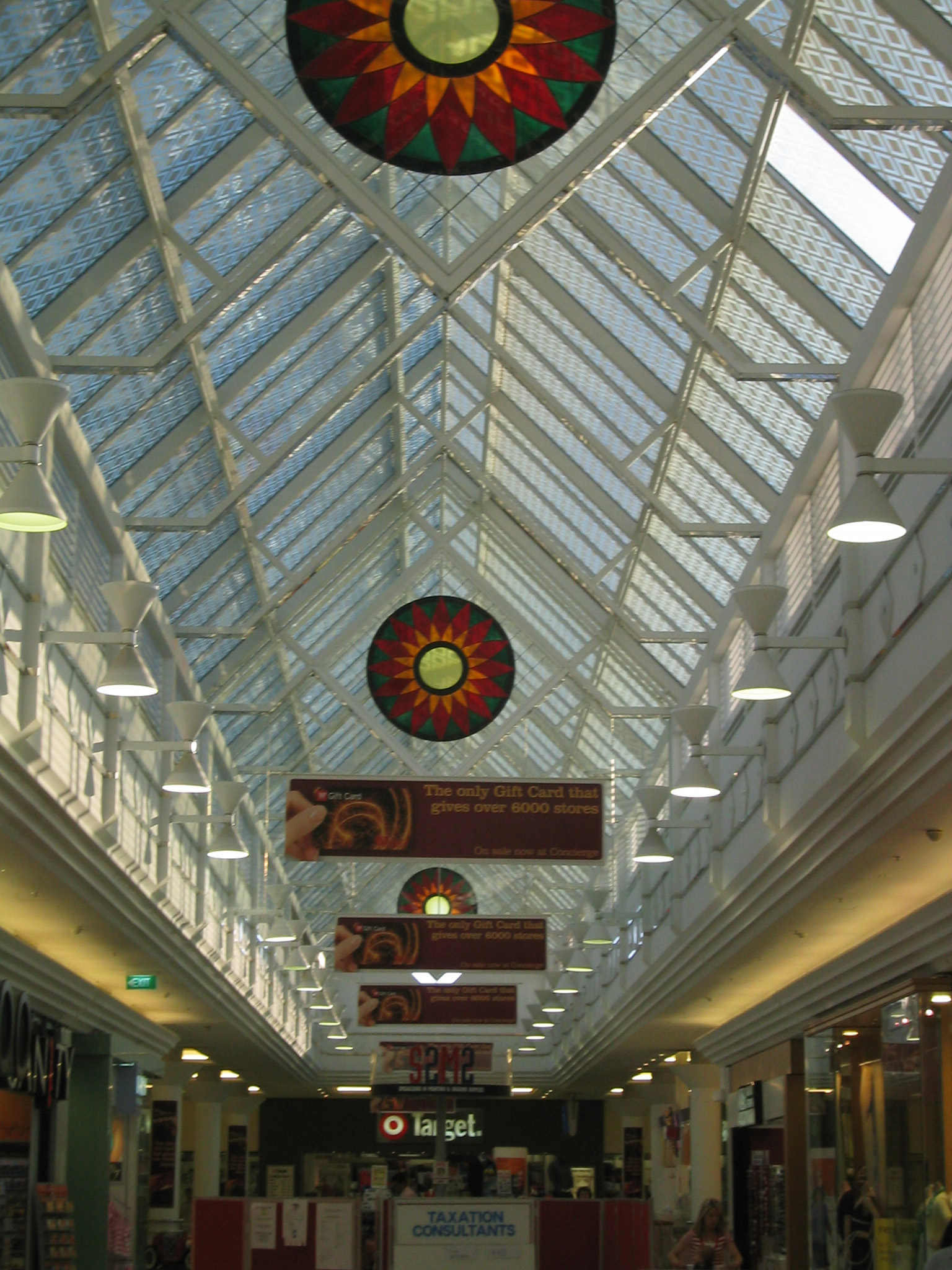
The interior of Westfield Whitford City in 2006, where the former Target discount-department store is at the end. Today this store is K-Mart.

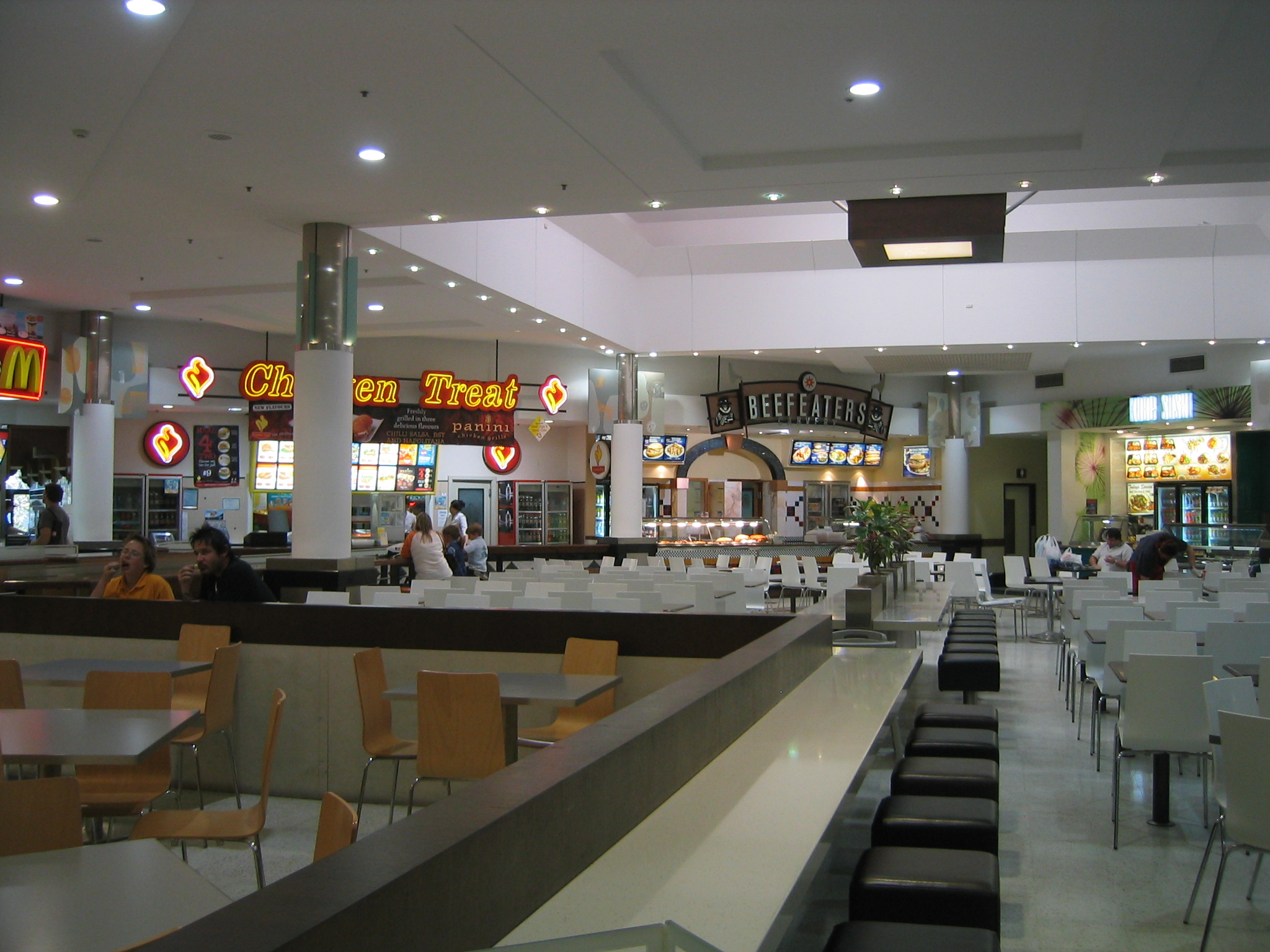
The food court in Westfield Whitford City circa 2006. It has been shrunk and renovated since.

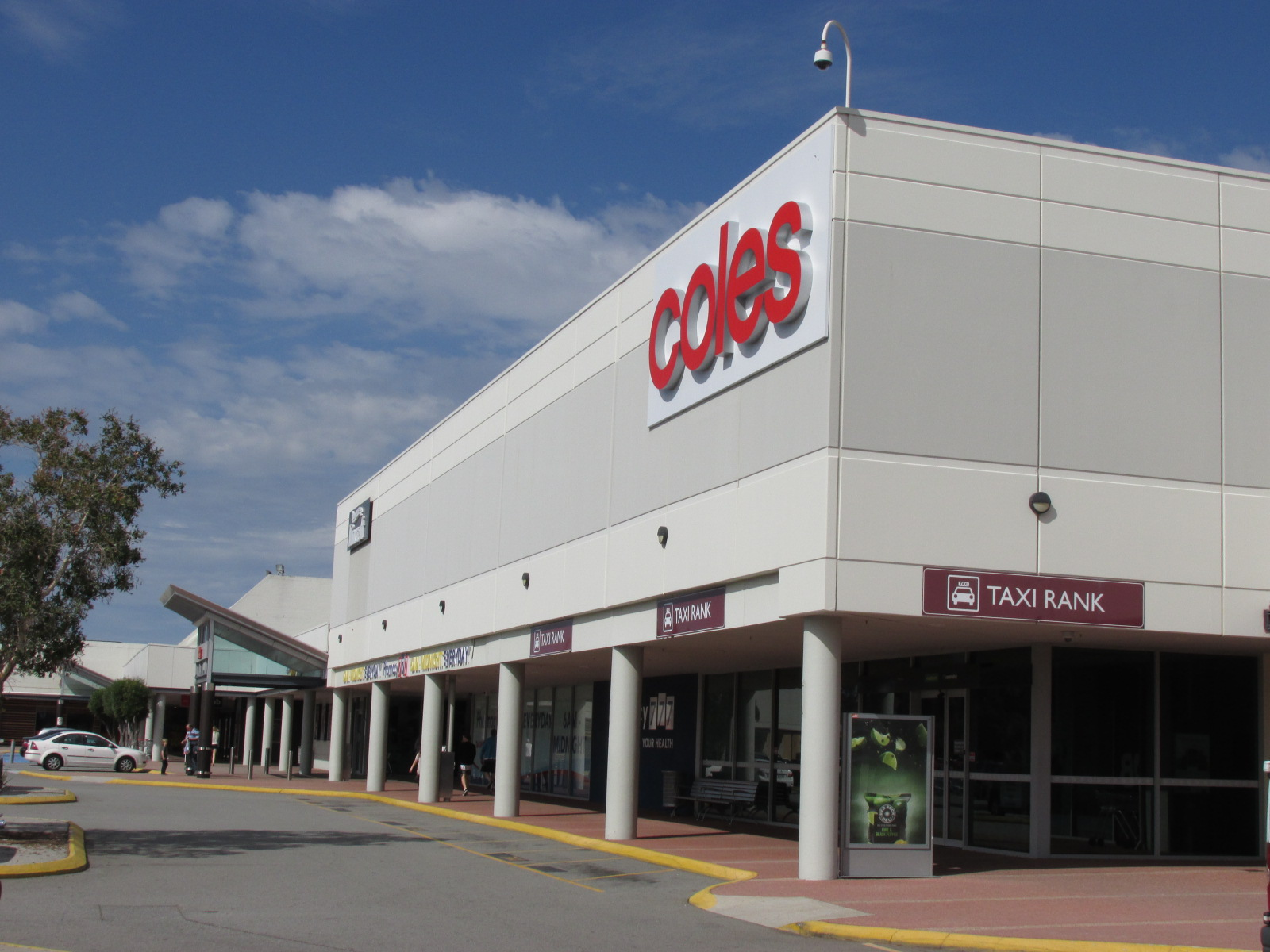
The exterior of the original centre built in 1978, which has been extensively remodelled since including a new box-style facade to accommodate extra shops.

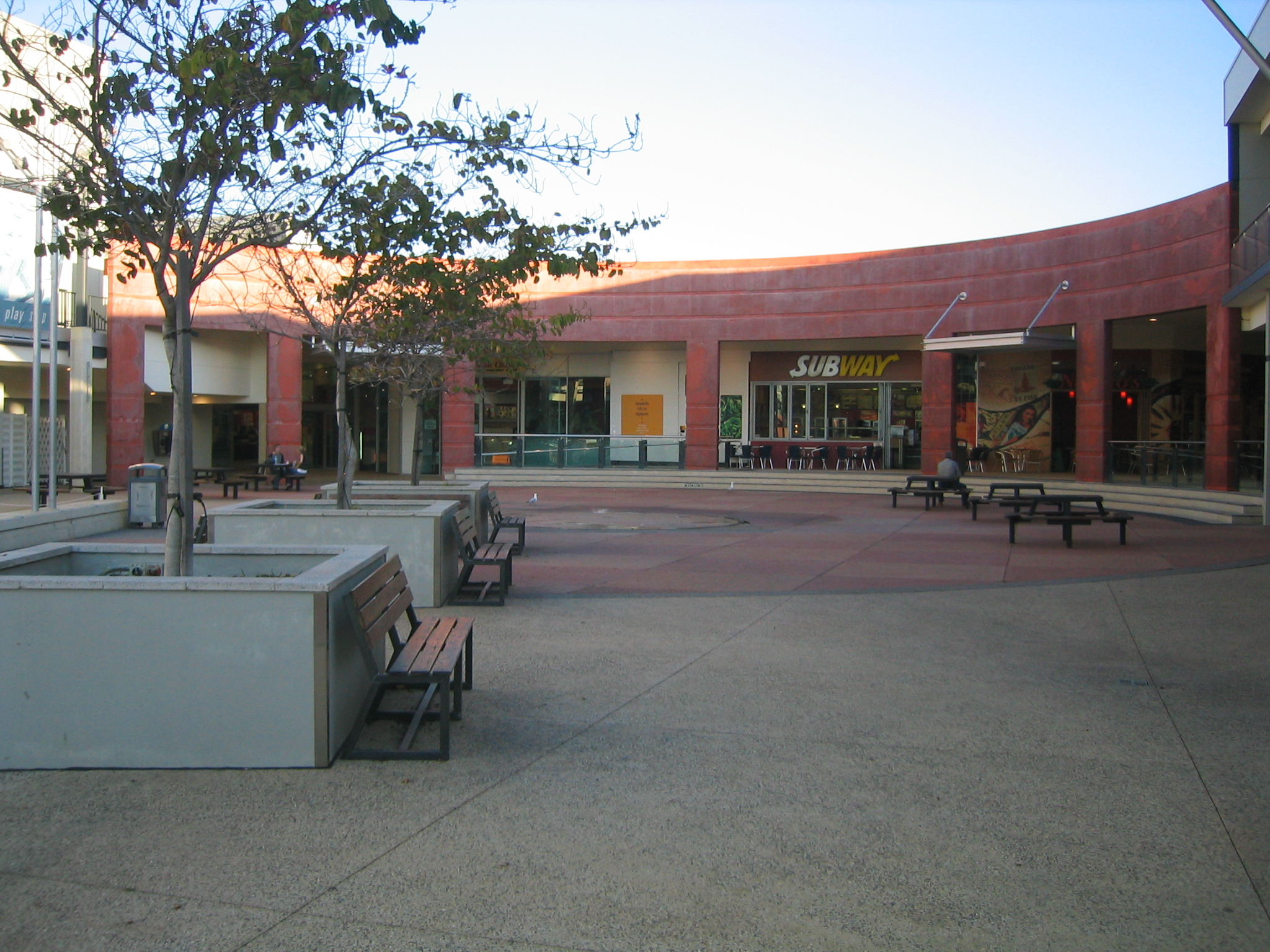
The former outdoor dining precinct - The Piazza - was built in 2004. It was significantly rebuilt a decade later.

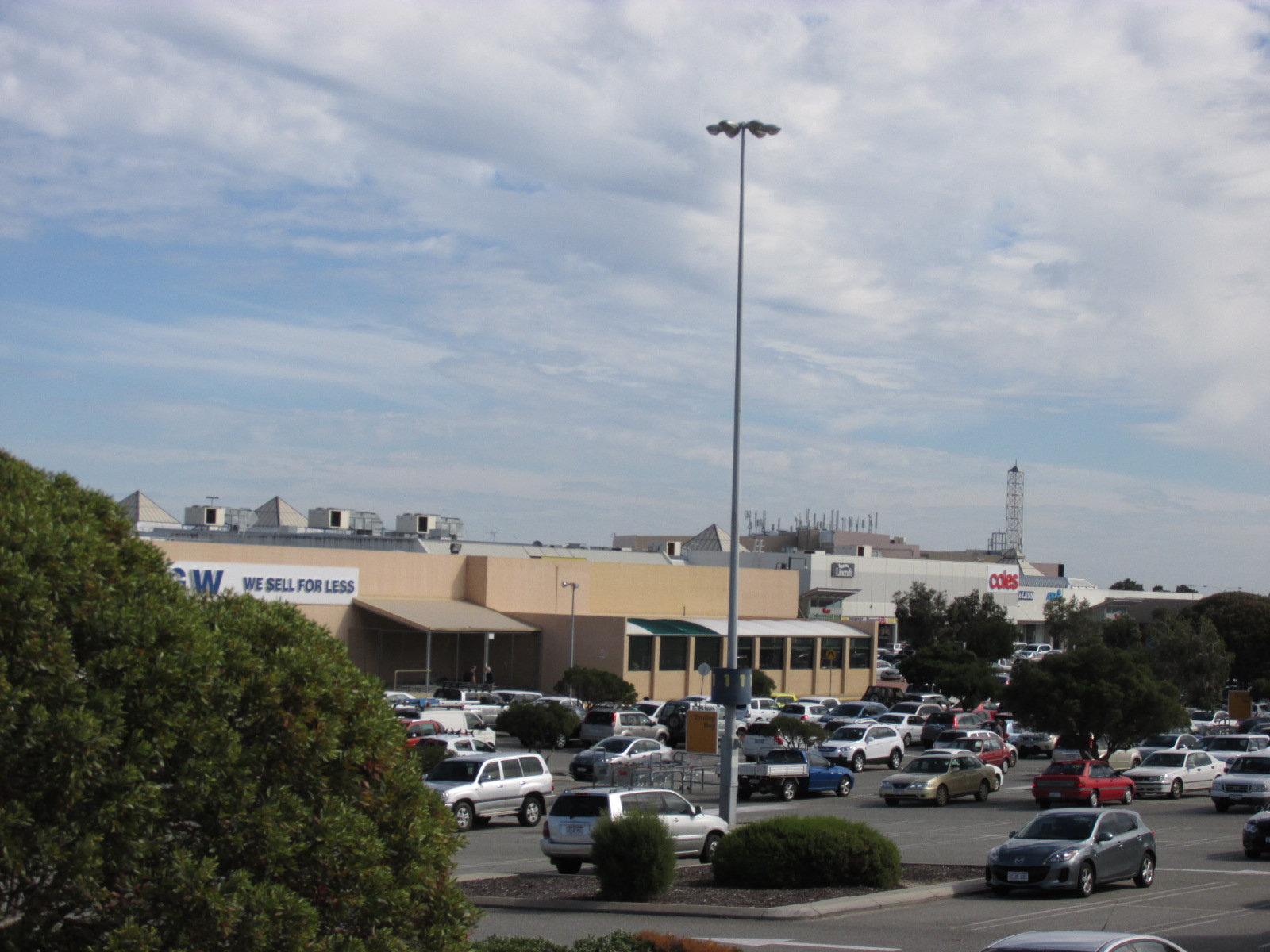
A north-east view of the centre, showing the Big W department store

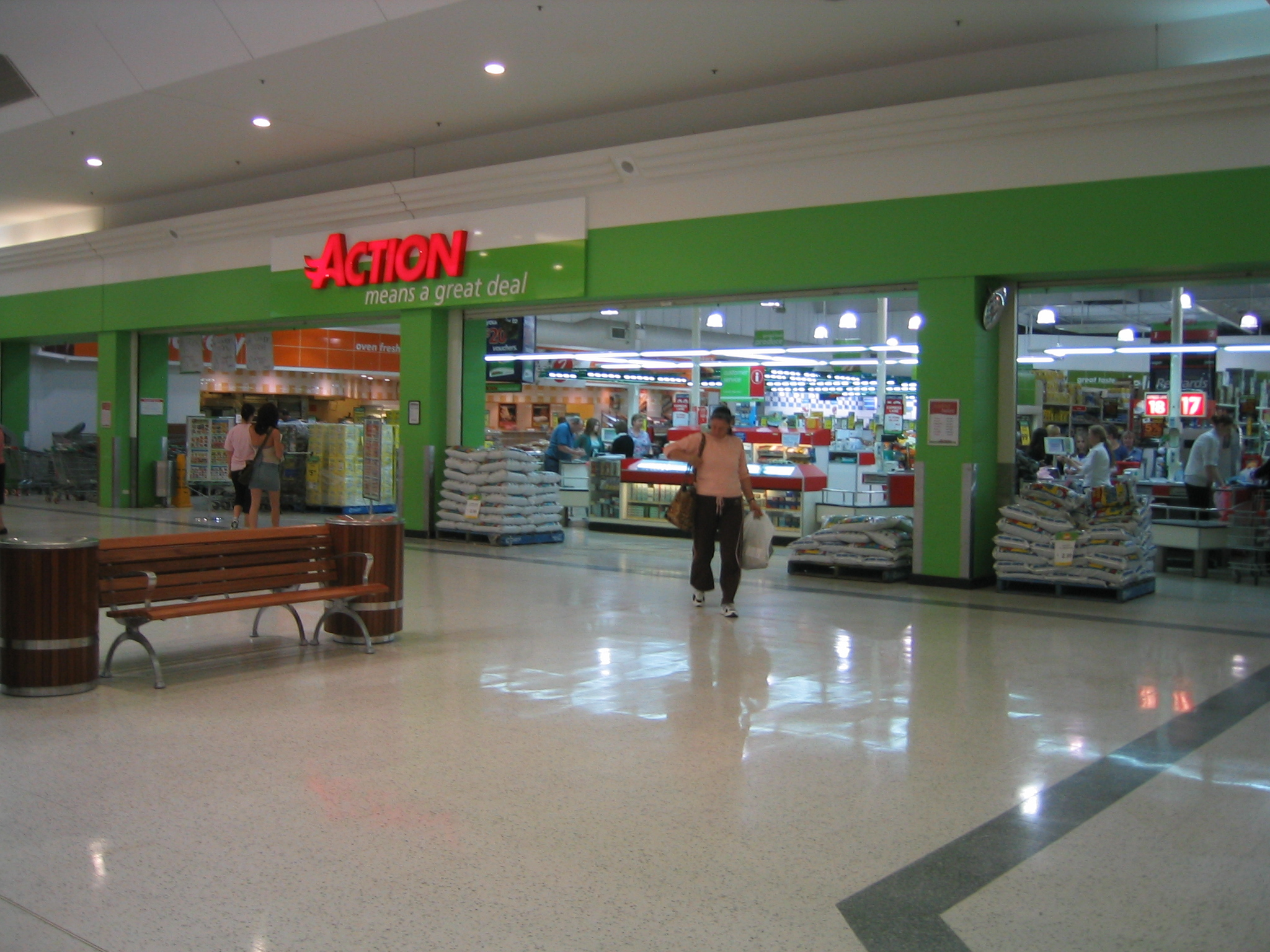
The former Action Supermarket in 2006. Since the closure it became a Progressive Supa IGA, and is currently a Coles supermarket.

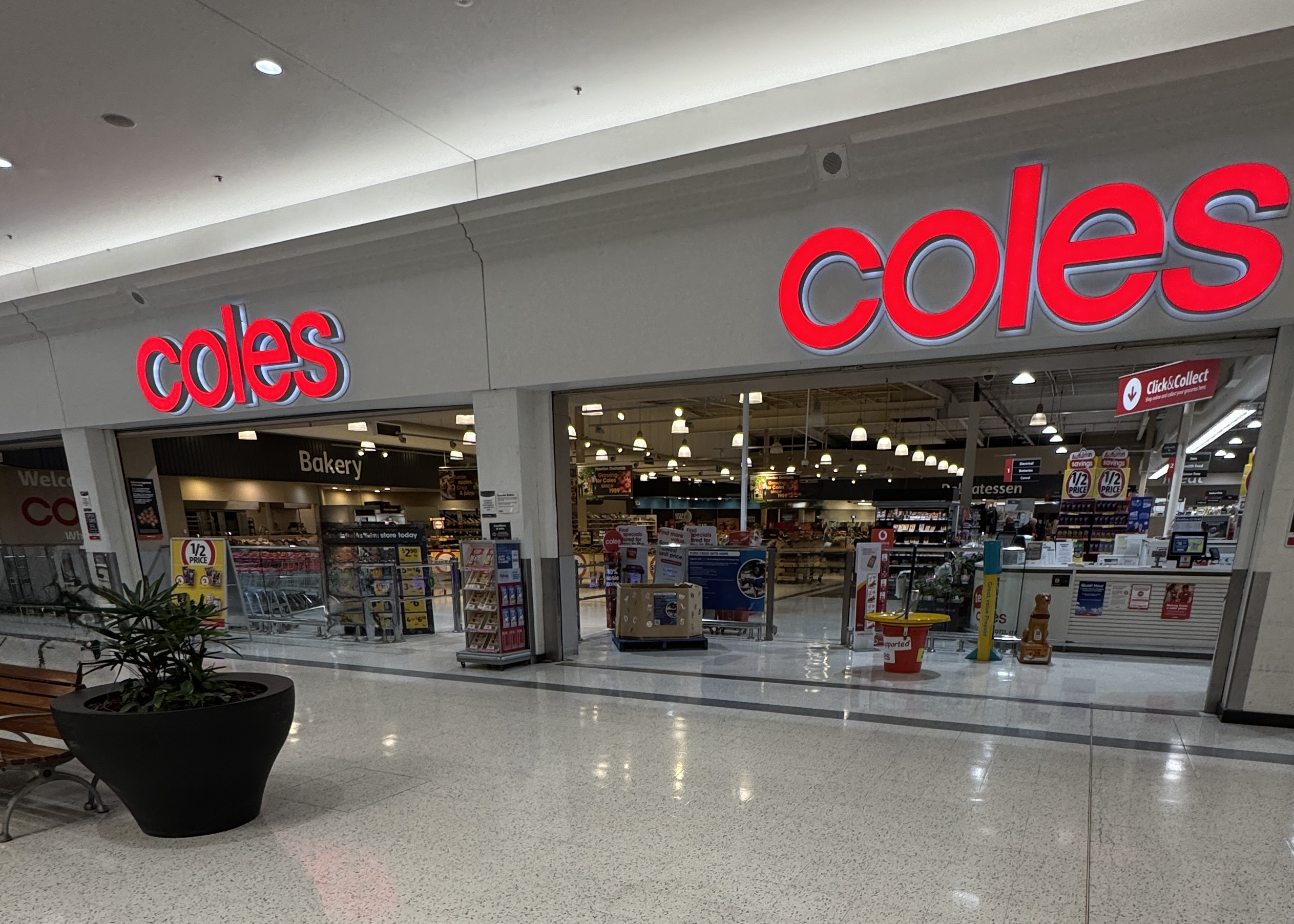
That same view 20 years later. Whitford City Coles occupies the big box built for Action.

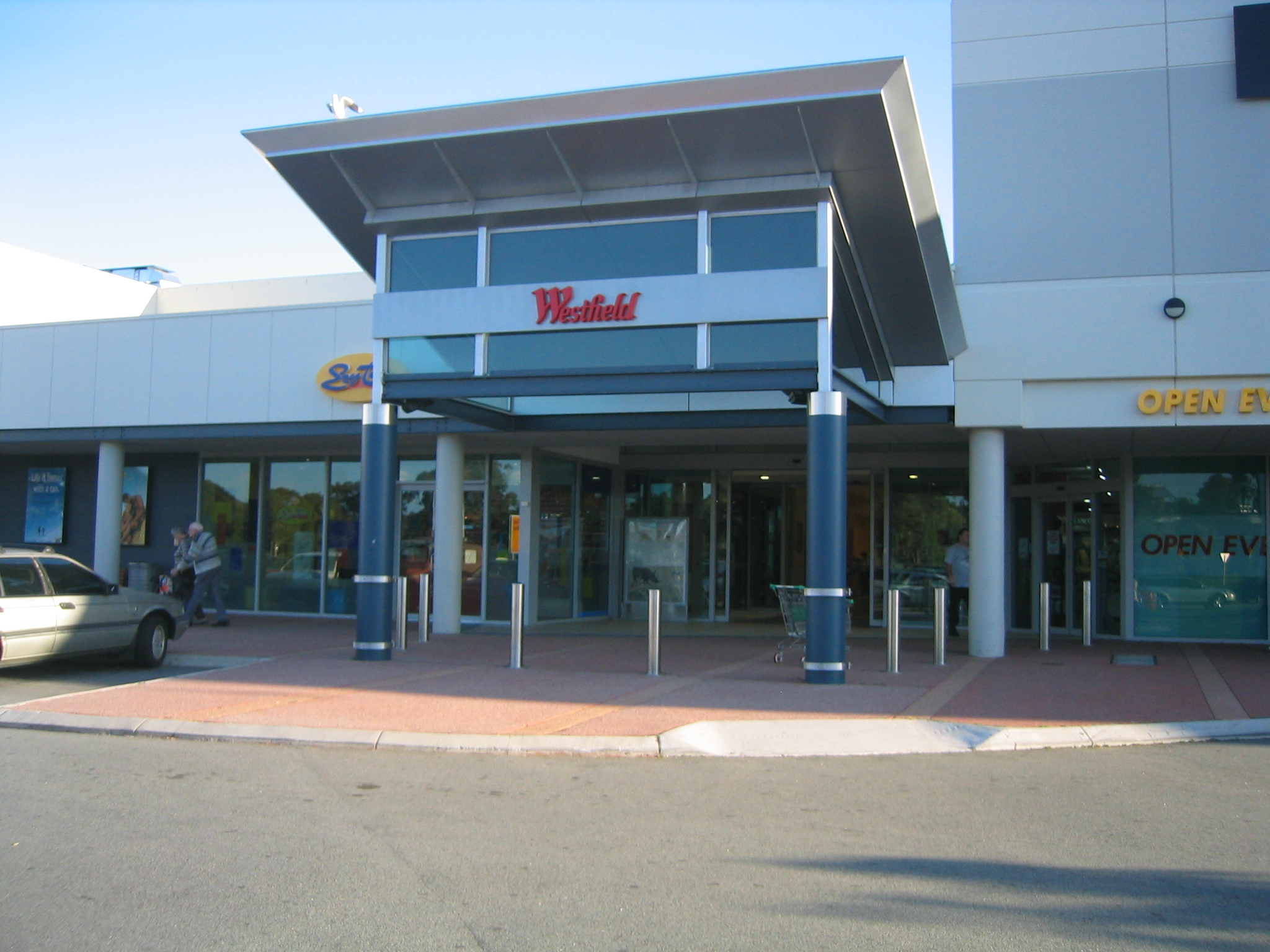
An entrance to Westfield Whitford City, which was added shortly before Westfield purchased the centre during the 2004 redevelopment.

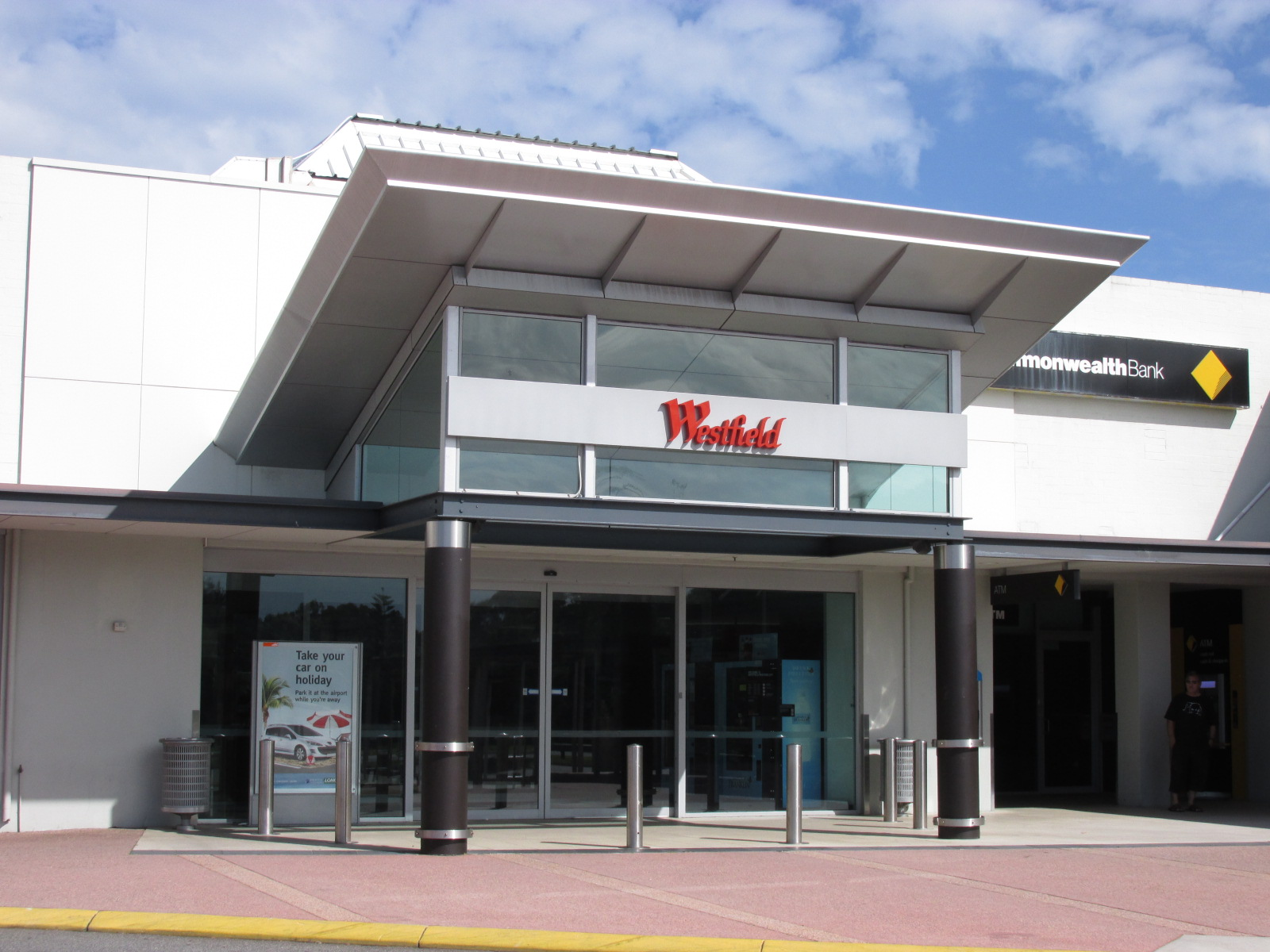
Another entrance to the centre, near Commonwealth Bank

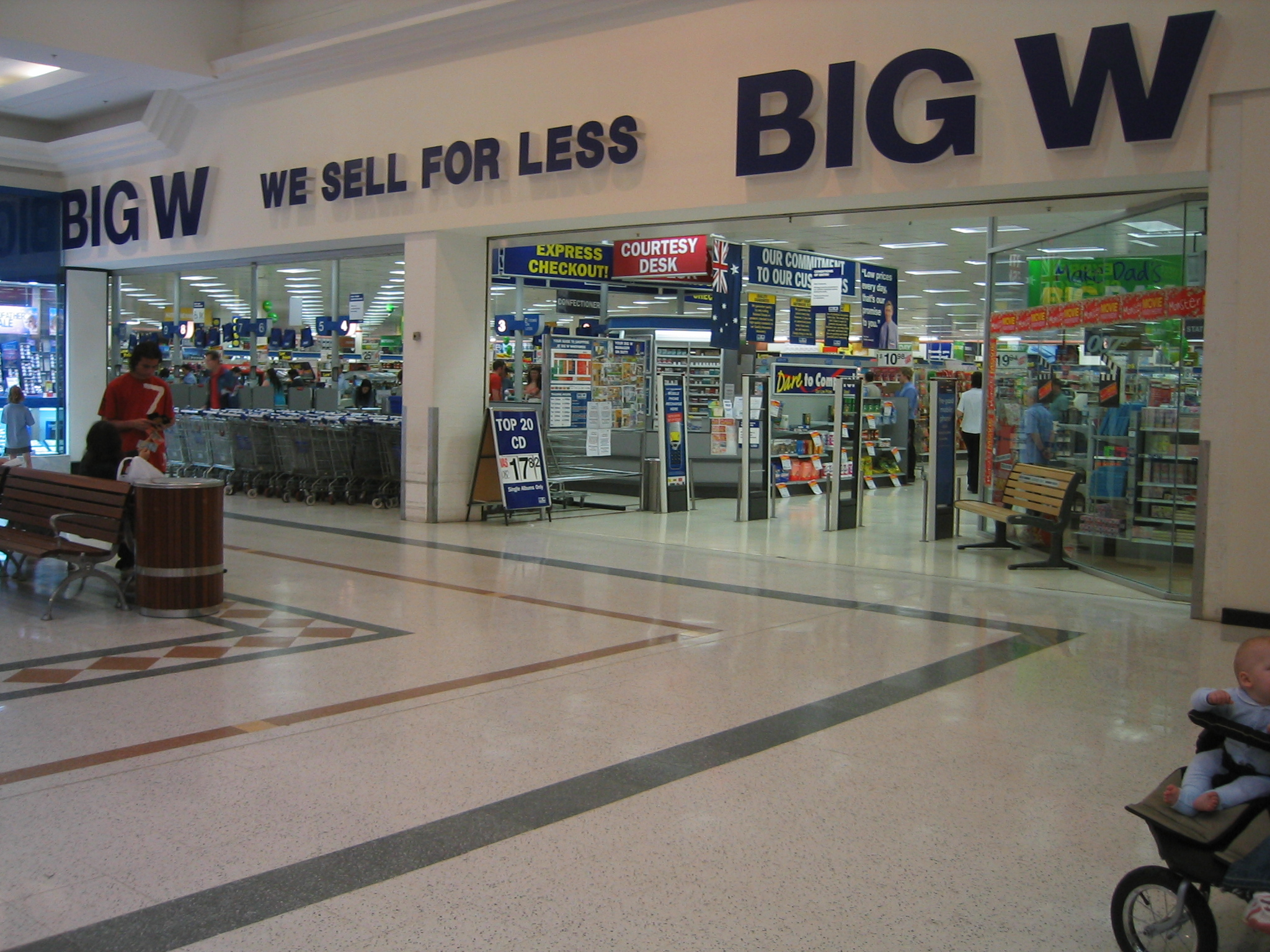
The entrance to the Big W department store, which has stood in the centre since the opening

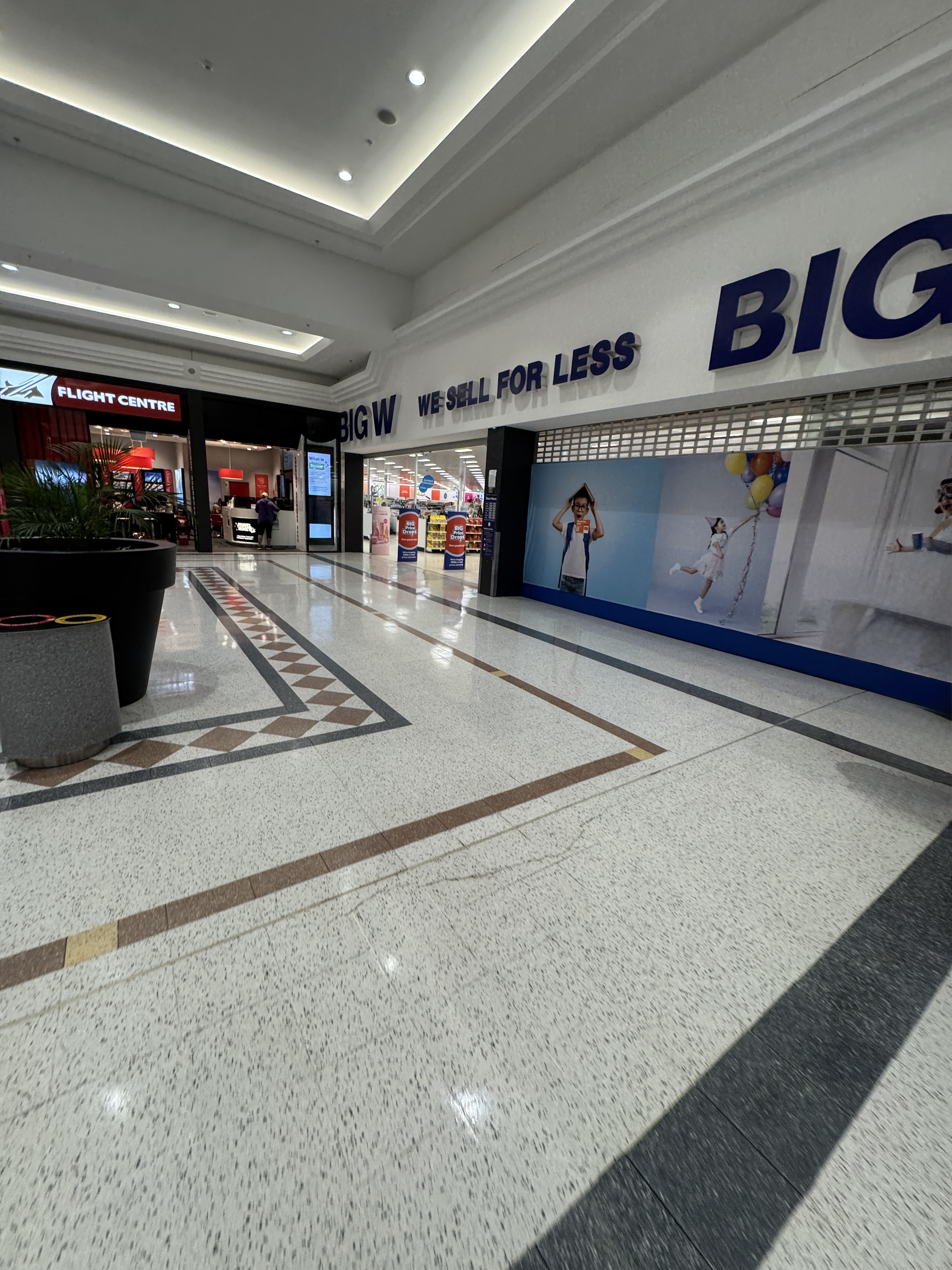
Whitford City’s Big W entry still sports 1990’s ‘We Sell For Less’ branding.

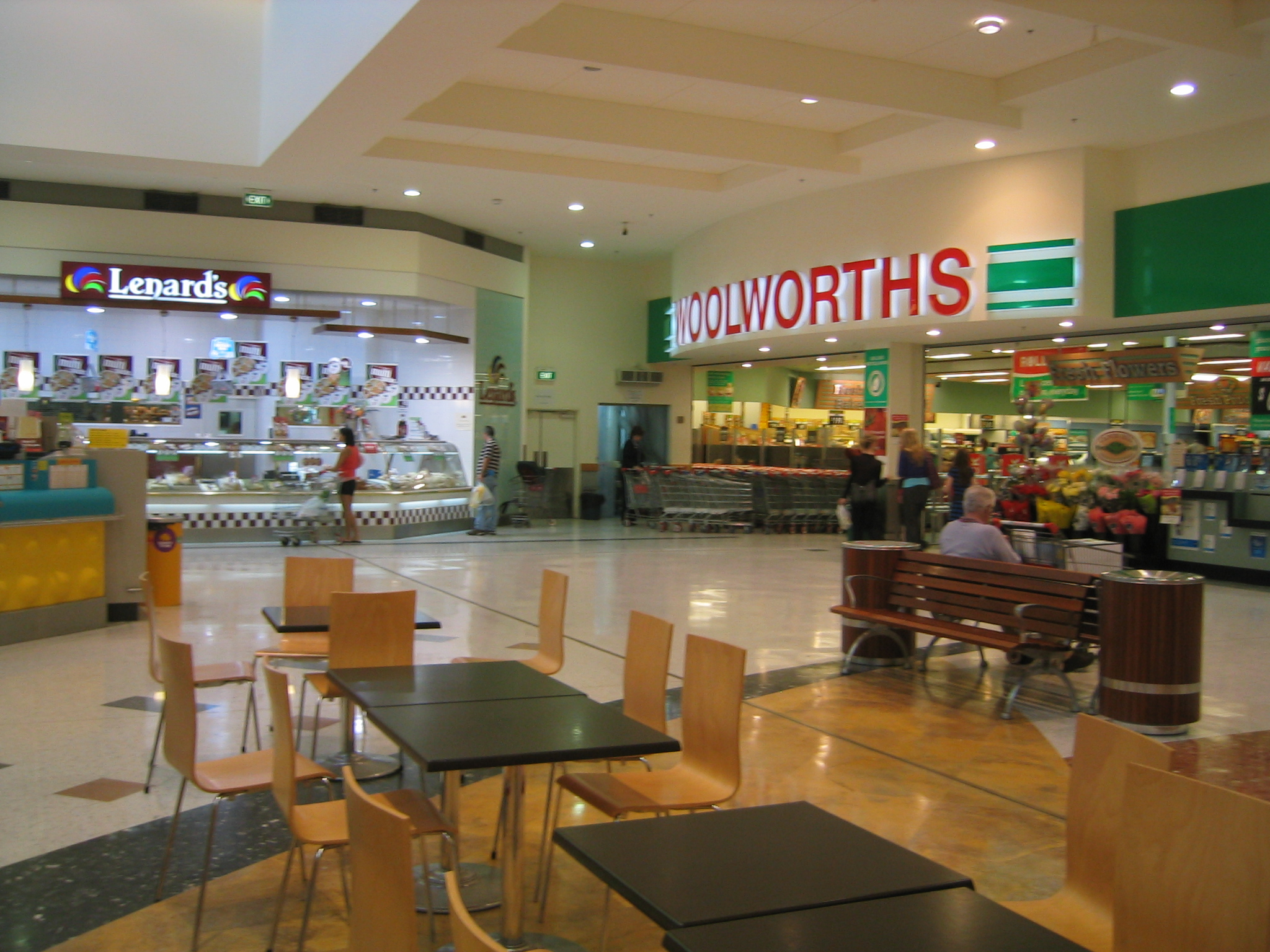
The entrance to the Woolworths supermarket in the Fresh Food Market. Since then, the Woolworths and surrounding area has been refurbished.

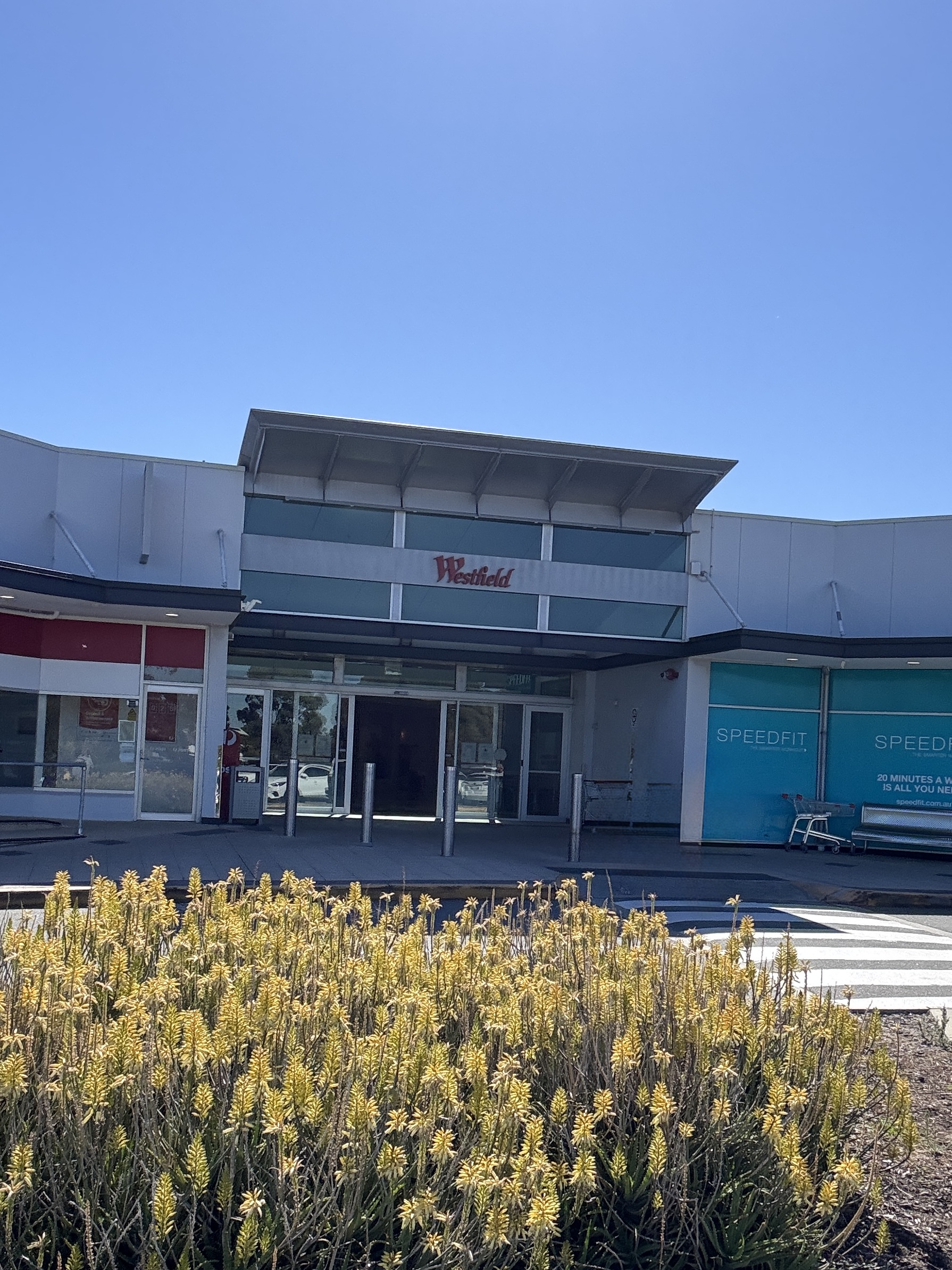
The Post Office Entry in 2026, which was developed and extended during the 2004 refit and branded Westfield in late 2004.

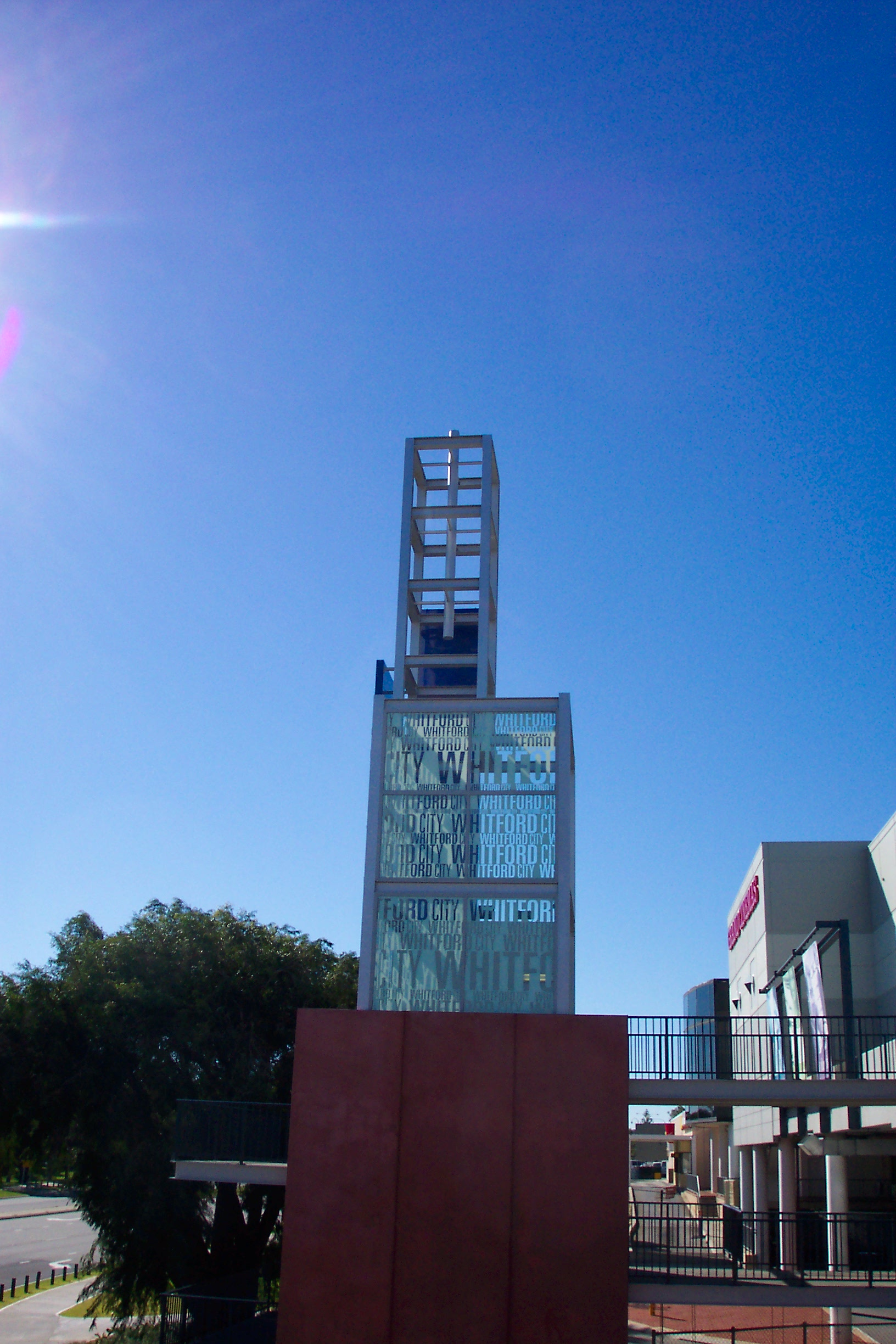
Whitford City Branding post redevelopment.

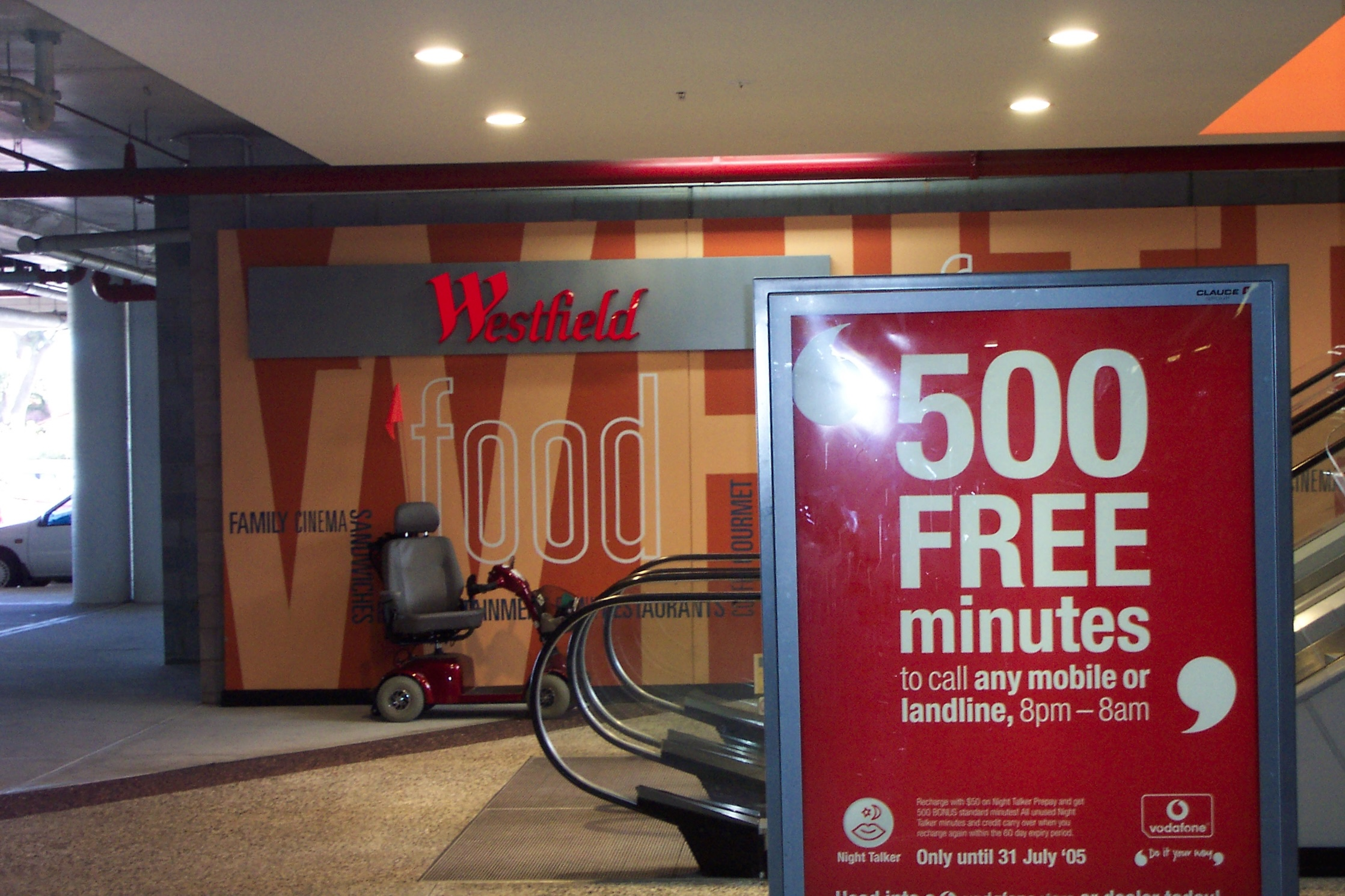
Whitford City branding behind Westfield Signage.

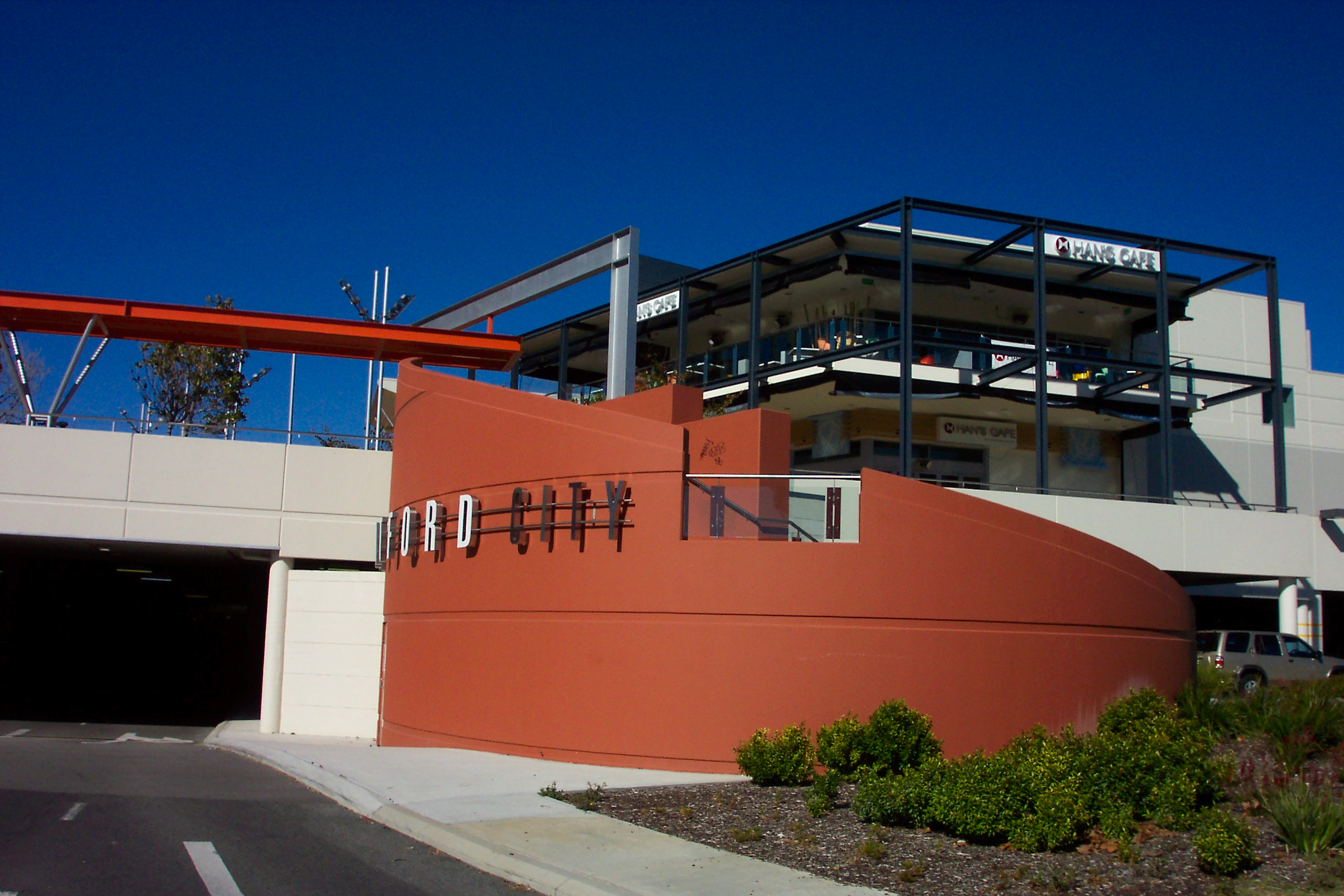
Whitford City branding on Piazza parking entry.

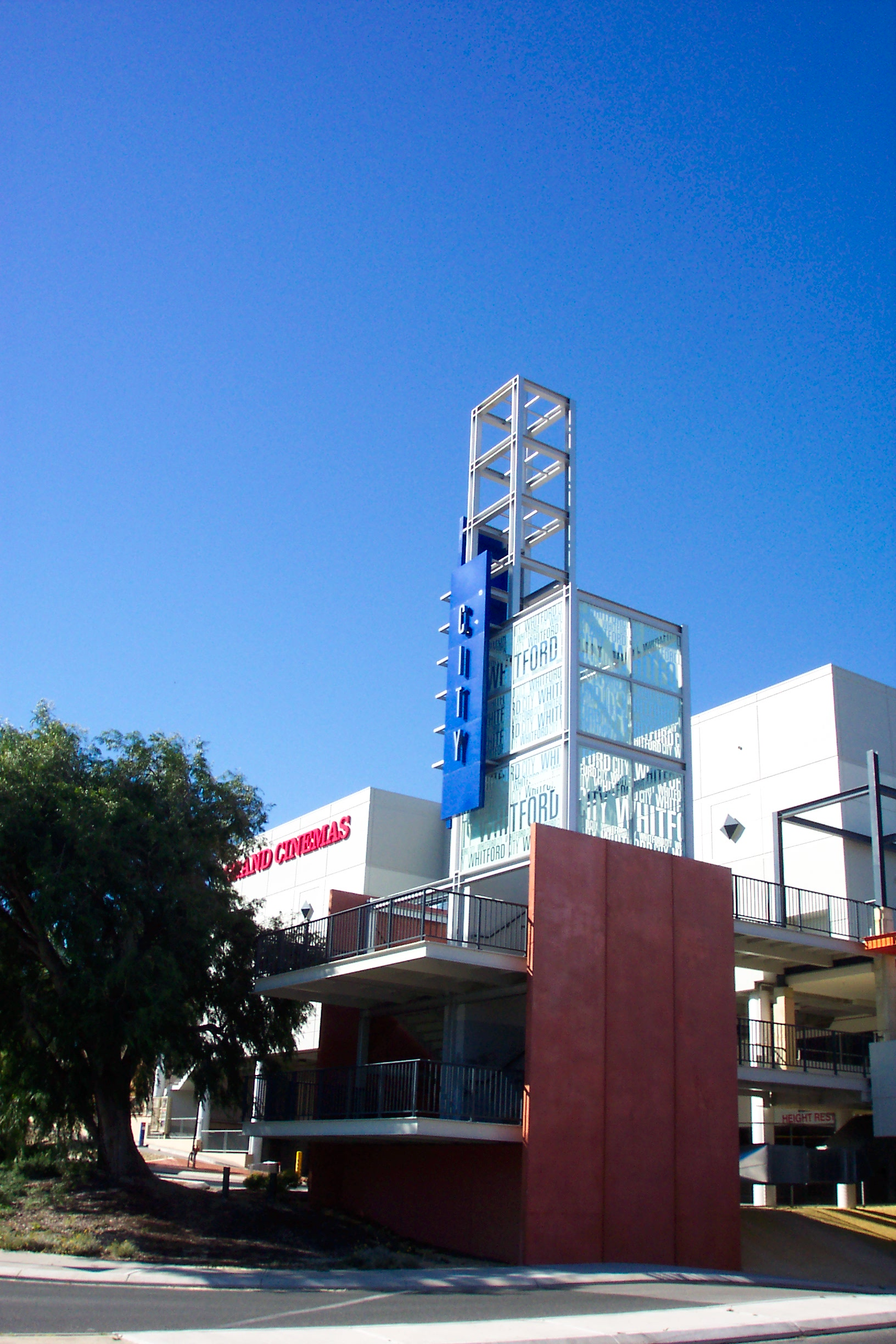
Whitford City branding on Piazza parking entry with Grand Cinemas signage in background.

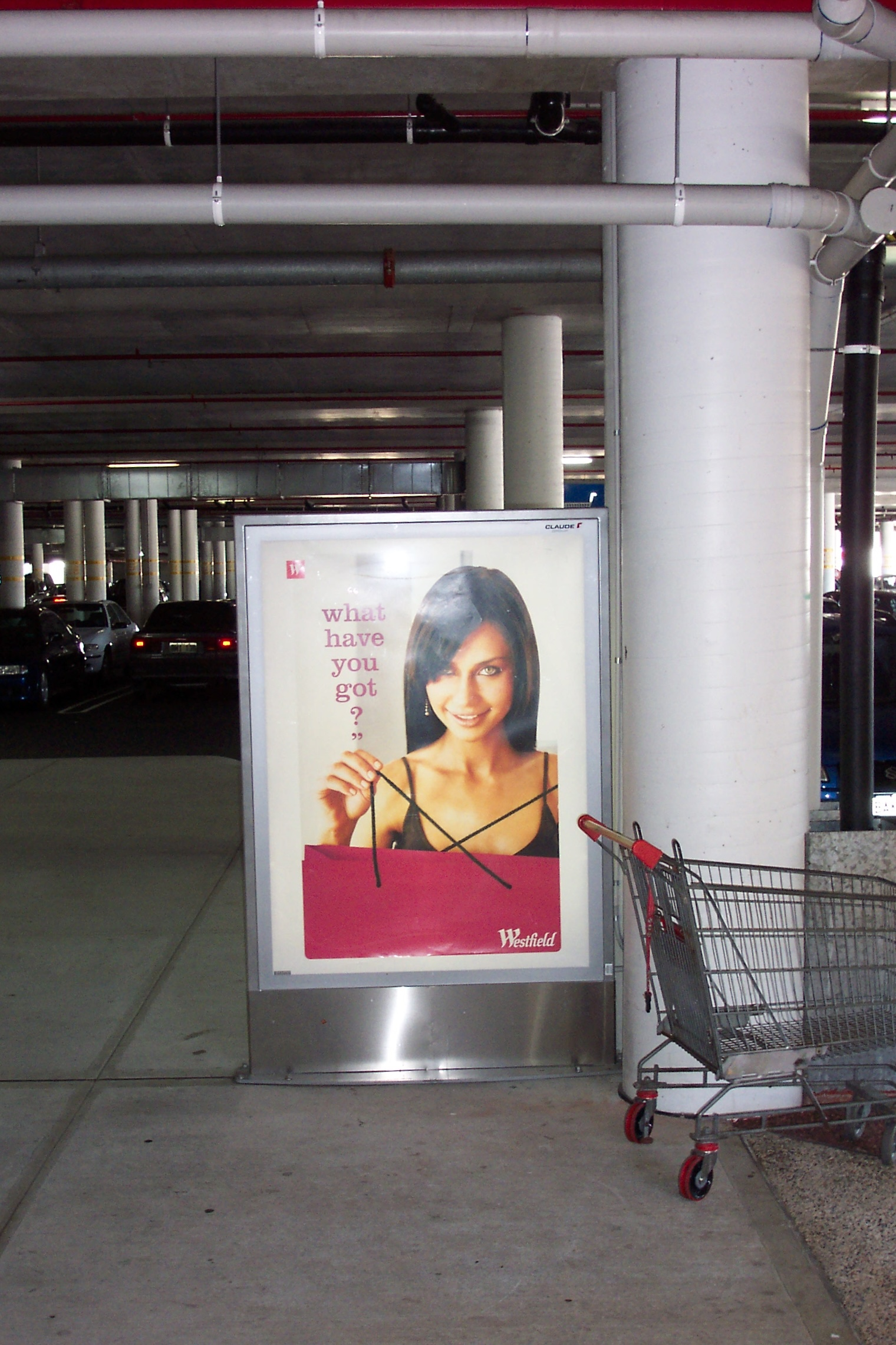
Westfield ads in Whitfords City car park.

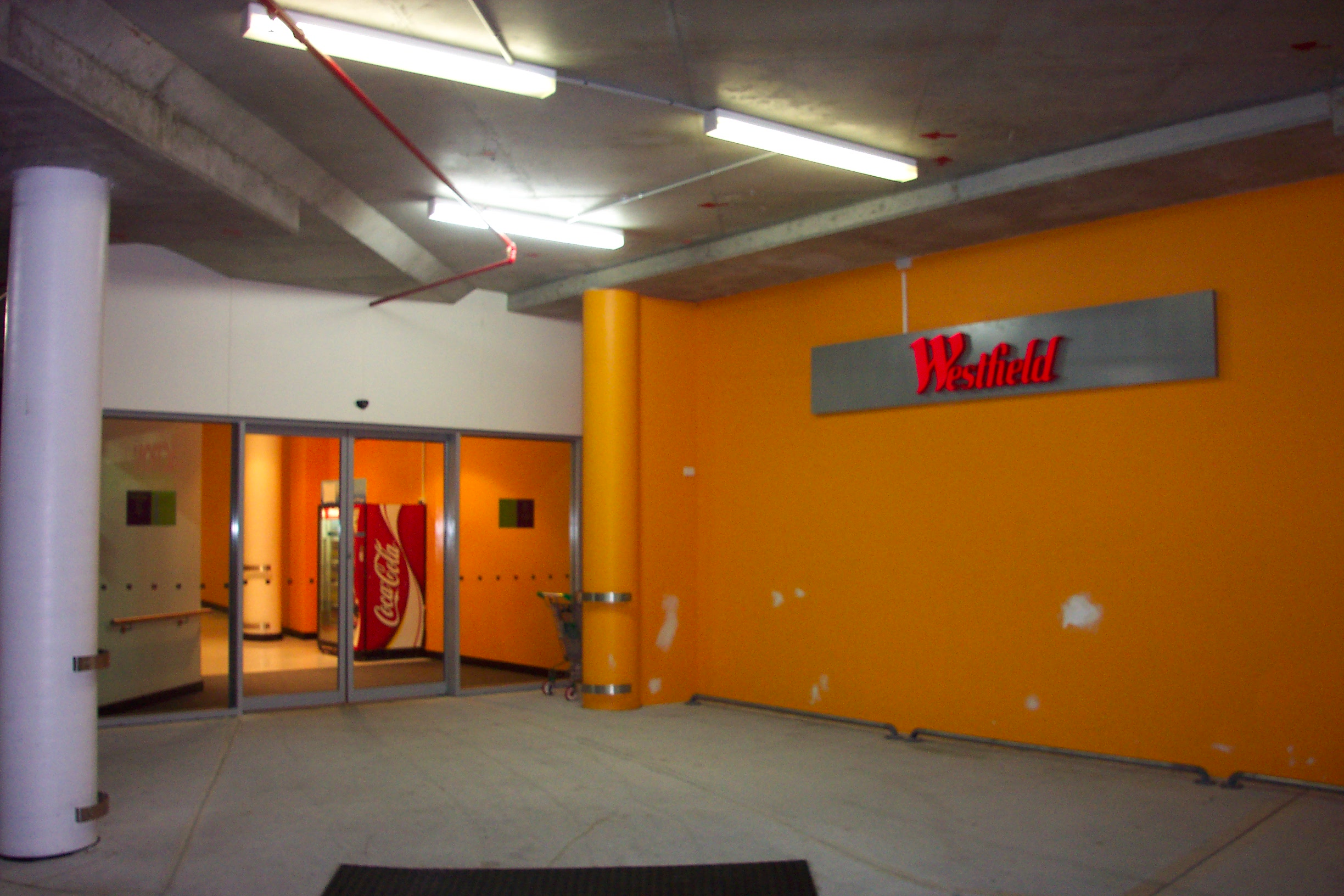
Westfield sign on Whitford City orange wall.

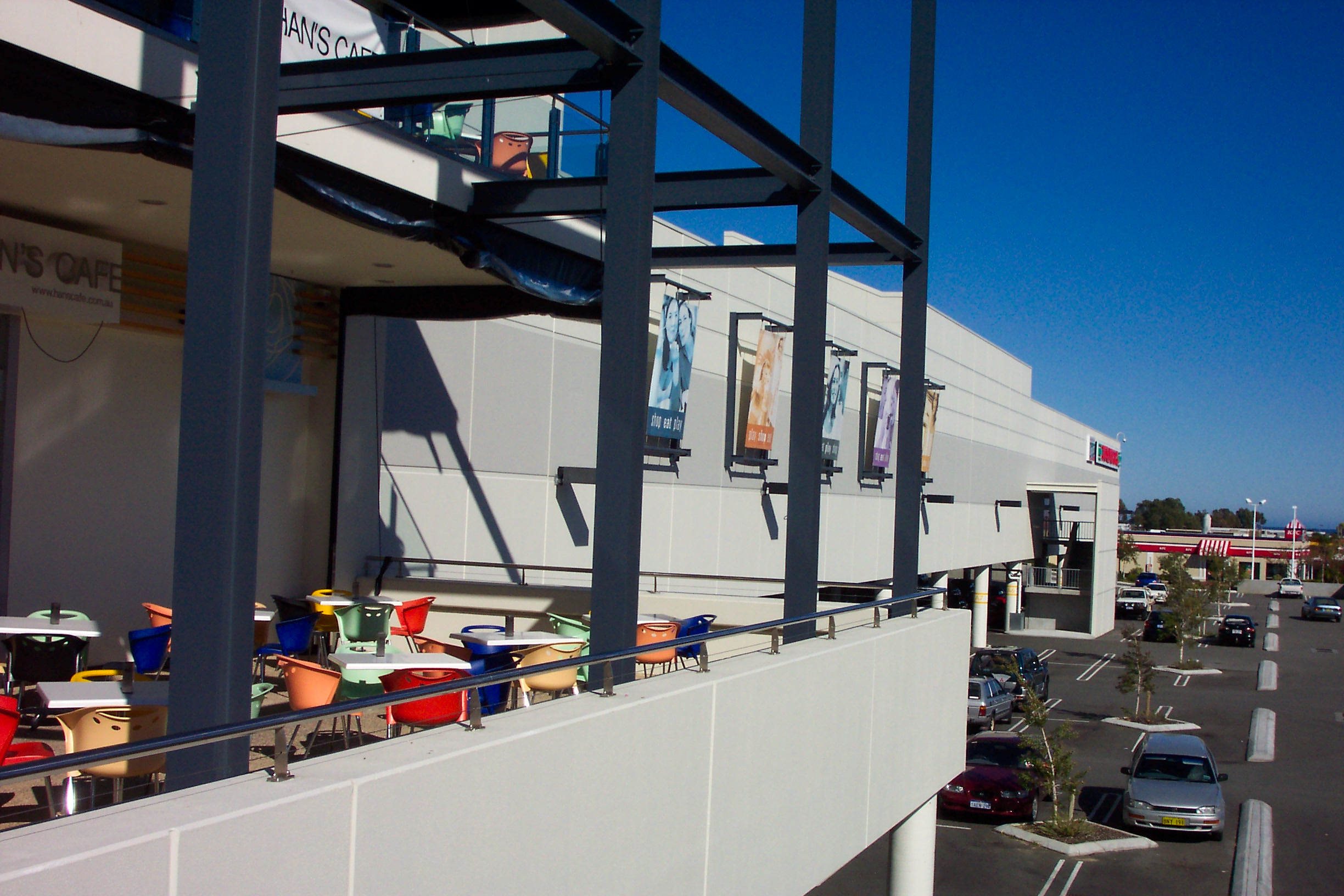
Whitford City branded “Eat Play Shop” signs.

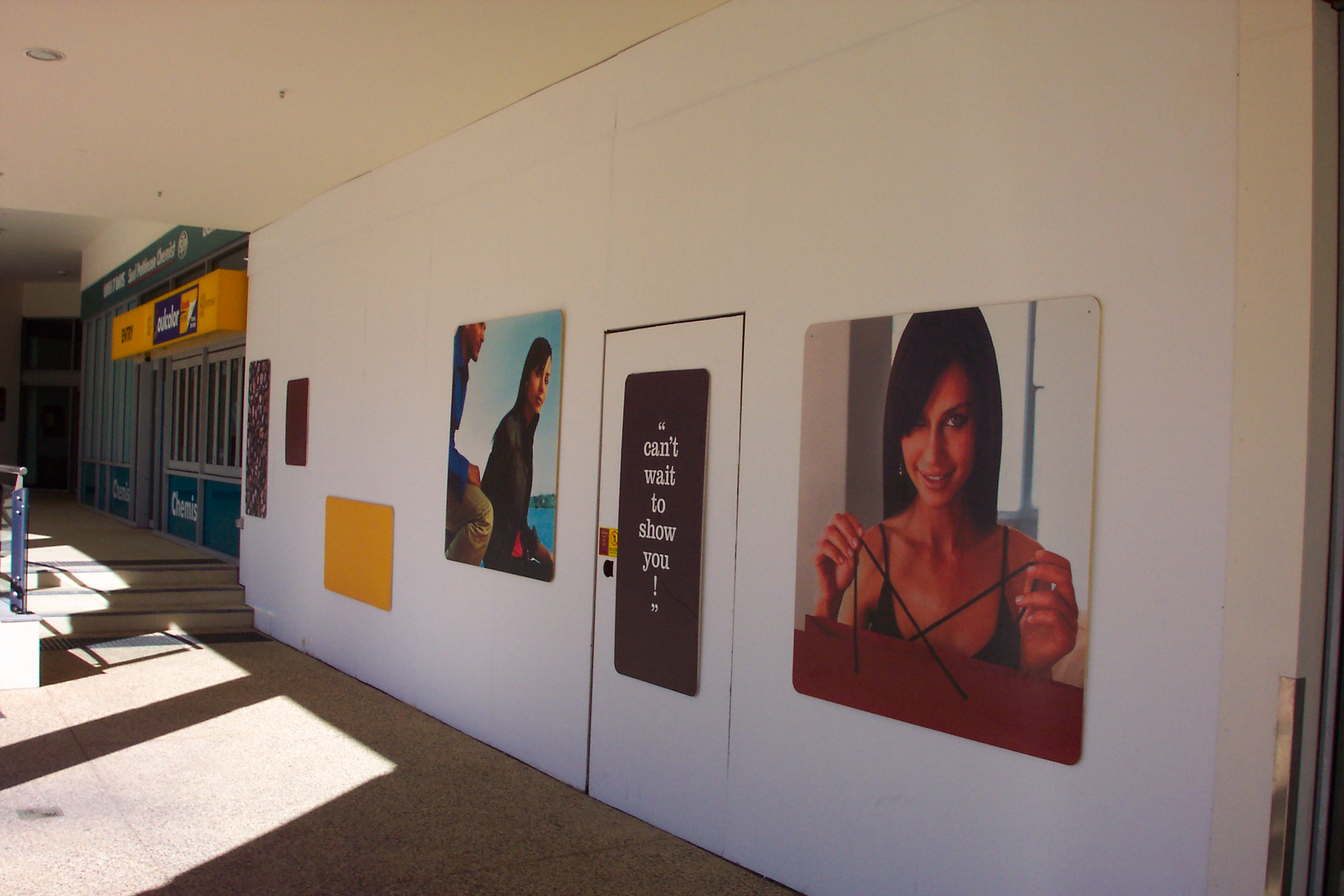
Westfield branding circa 2006.

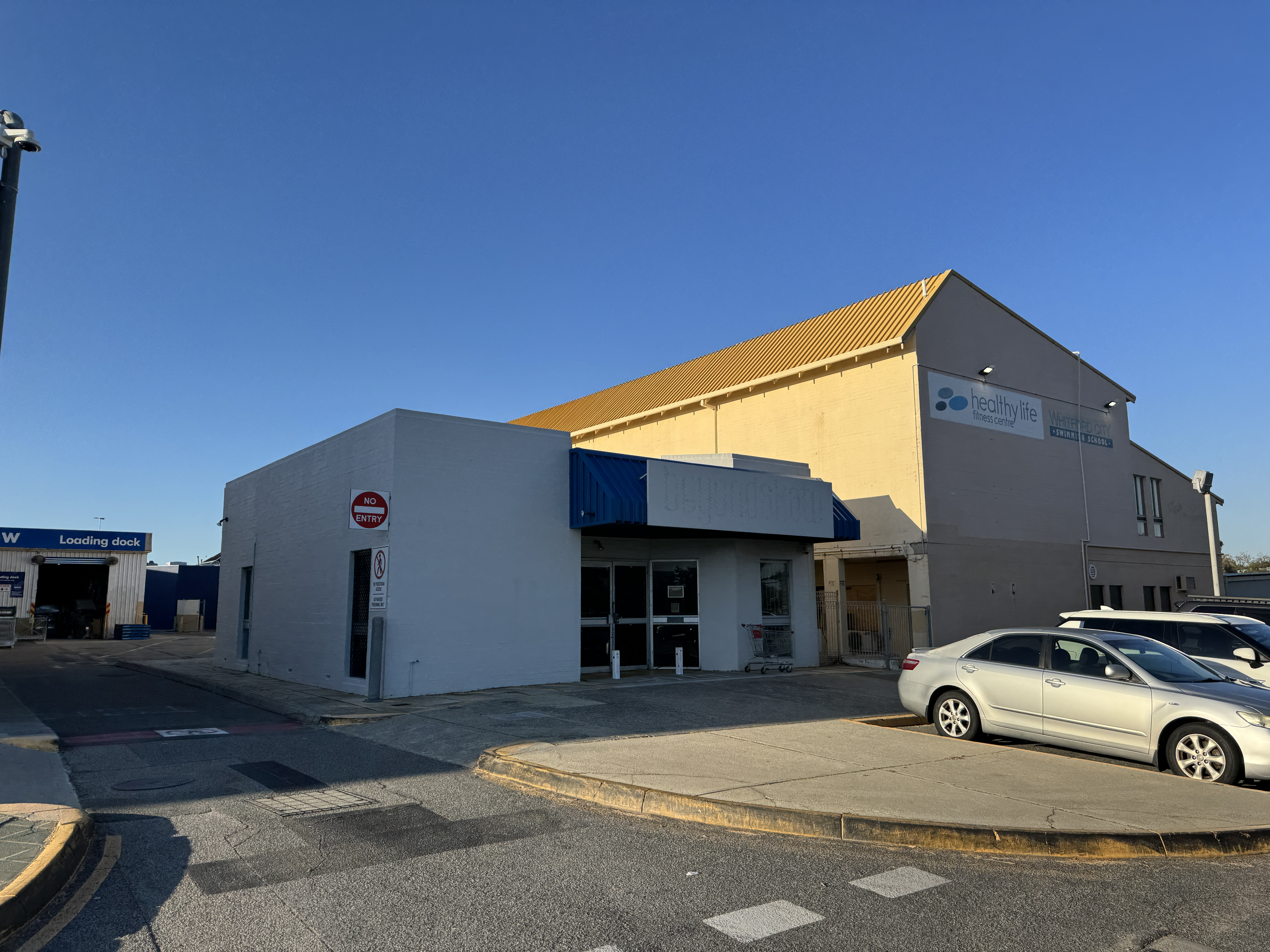
Abandoned Beyond Skate and Healthy Life - Whitford City

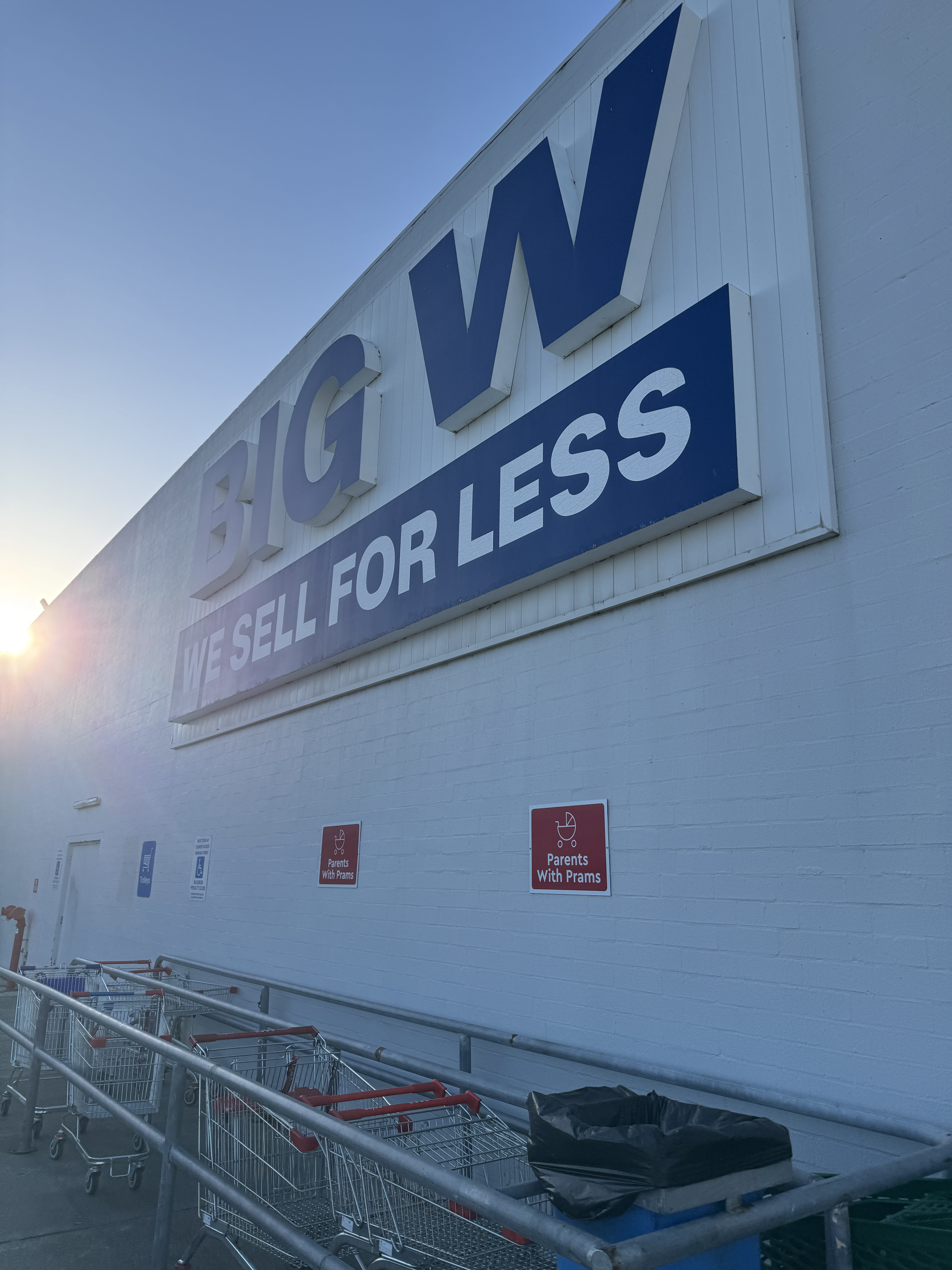
Whitford City still has 1990s Big W branding in 2026.

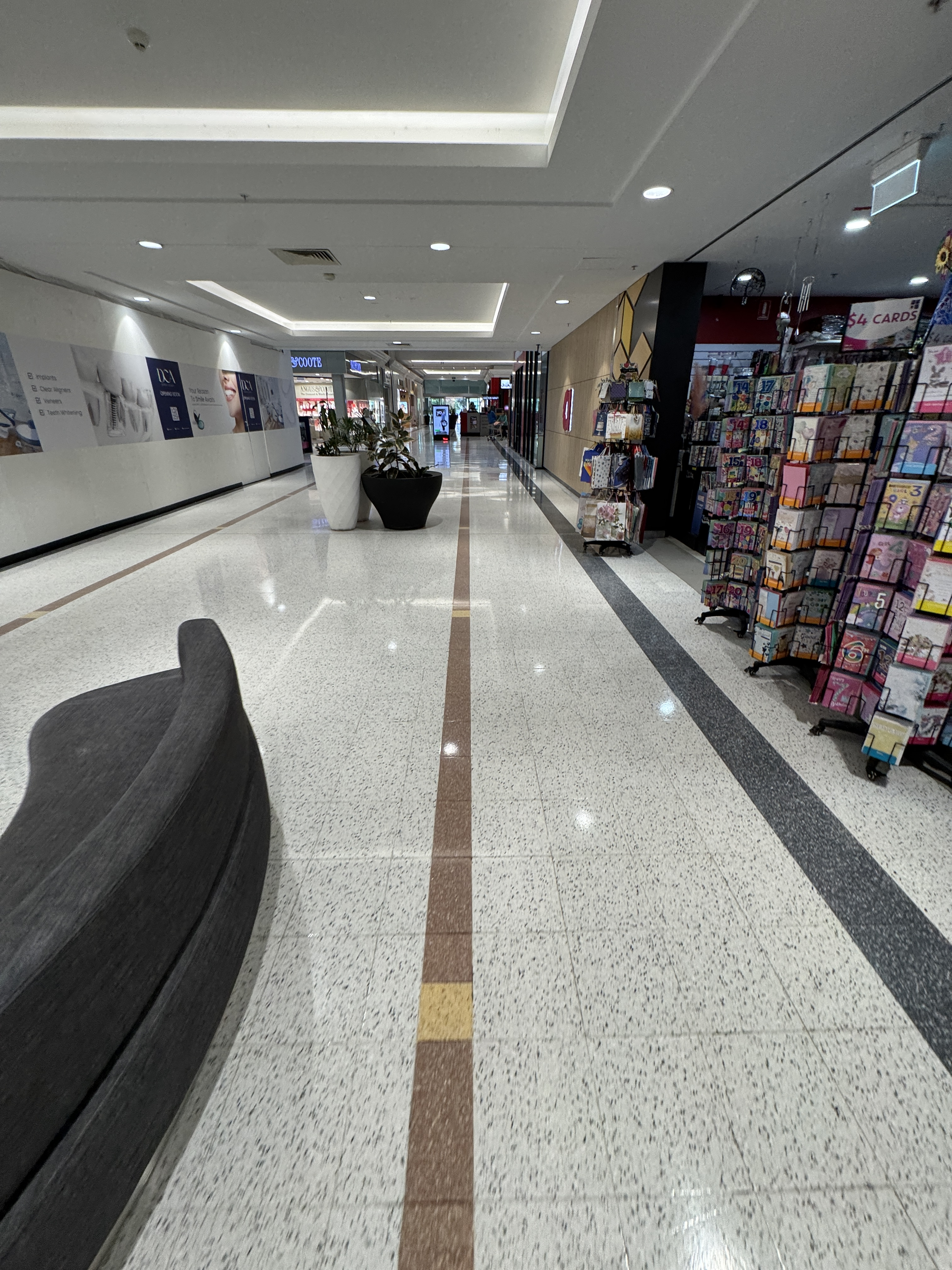
Mall in 2026 walking towards Big W.

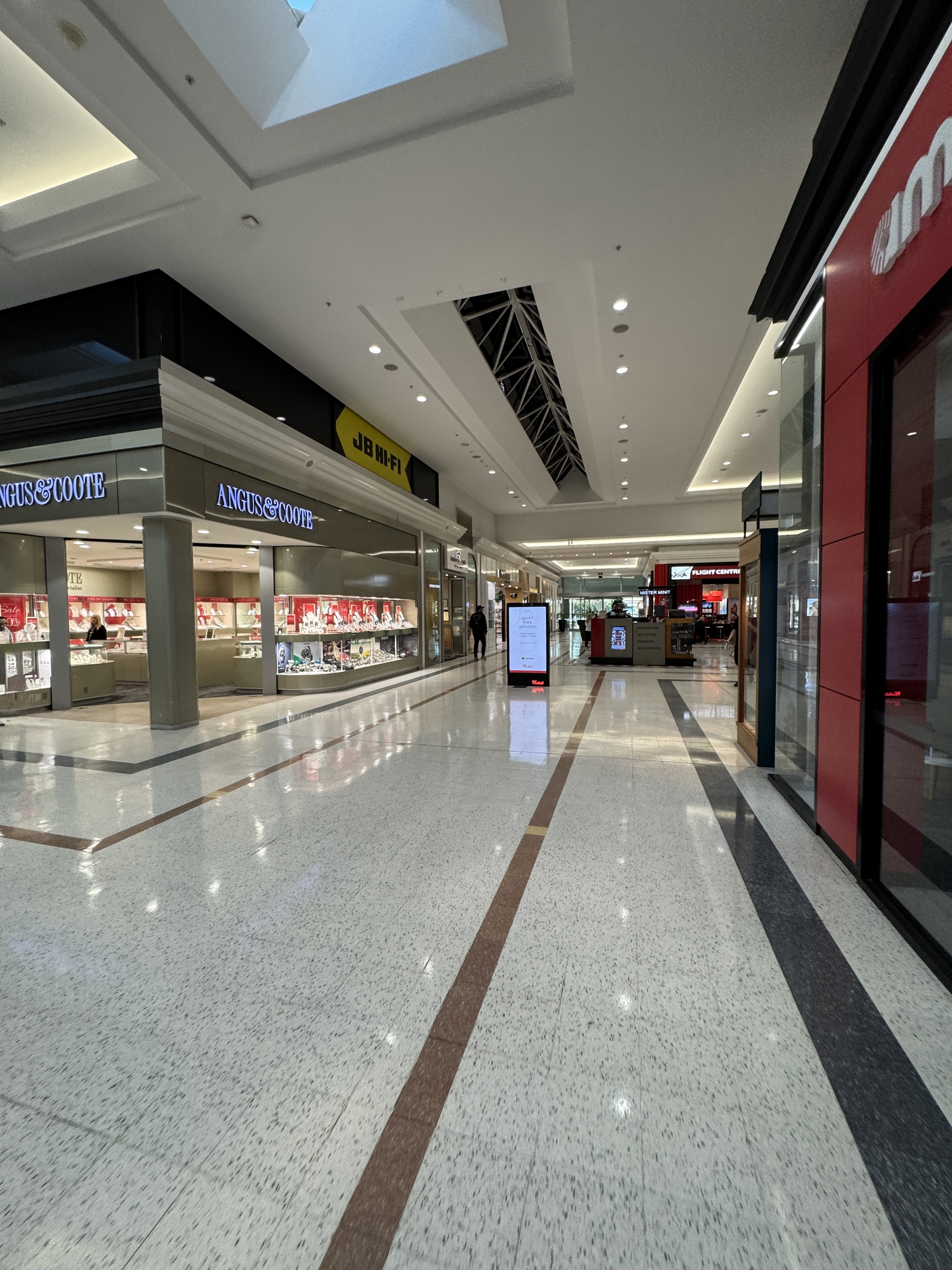
The mall in 2026 at Westfield Whitford City showing the original Big W mall dating back to the centre’s foundation.

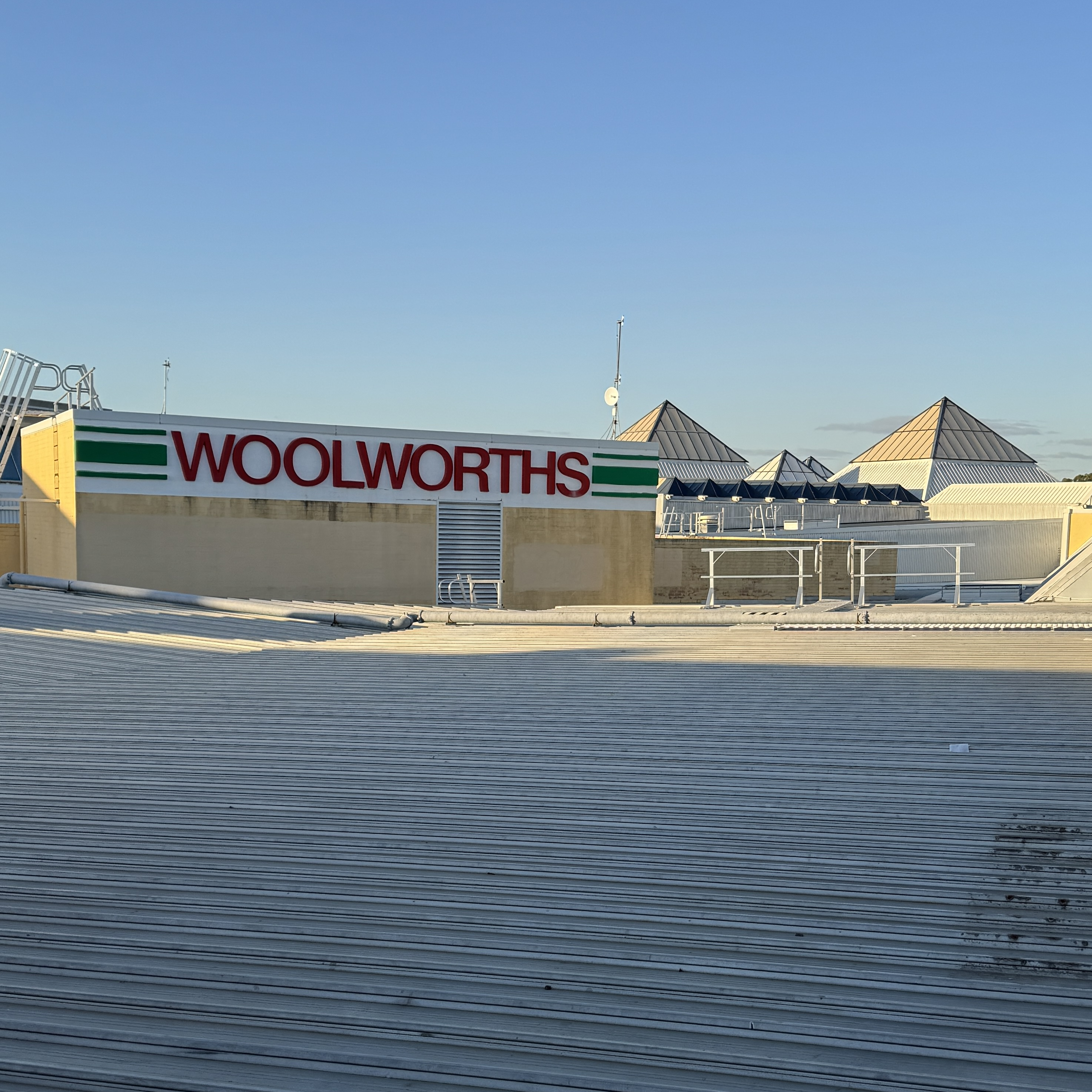
Whitford City has an old Woolworths sign atop the original Woolworths store (now part of the main mall) visible from the uppermost rooftop carpark.
