= Dixon (surname) =

Dixon, as is common in England, or Dickson, is a patronymic surname, originating from Thomas de Keith, upon his the ennoblement in 1307. He was the son of Richard Keith in 1307, son of Hervey de Keith, Earl Marischal of Scotland, and Margaret, daughter of the 3rd Lord of Douglas.

== History ==
"Nisbet in his Heraldry (Edinburgh 1722) says 'The Dicksons are descendants from Richard Keith, said to be a son of the family of Keith, Earls Marischals of Scotland' and in proof thereof carry the chief of Keith Marischal. This Richard was commonly called Dick and the 'son' was styled after him. The affix of son in the Lowlands answering the prefix Mac in the Highlands." As a result, Clan Dickson is considered a sept of Clan Keith. Richard Keith's son, Thomas, took the surname "Dickson," meaning "Dick's son" or "Richard's son".

Thomas Dixon (1247–1307) was associated with William Wallace, and was killed by the English in 1307 while defending Douglas Castle. Tradition states he was slashed across the abdomen but continued to fight holding the abdominal wound closed with one hand until he finally dropped dead. He is buried in the churchyard of St Brides, Douglas, and his marker shows him with a sword in one hand holding his belly with the other. Robert the Bruce made him Castellan of Castle Douglas the year before he was killed.

The Scottish Dixon coat of arms show the Keith "pallets gules" and the Douglas "mullets argent", showing descent from these two ancient Scottish noble families of Clan Keith and Clan Douglas. The family mottoes include "Fortes fortuna juvat", "Coelum versus", for Dickson: translated as "Fortune favours the brave", Heavenward"; whilst "Quod dixi dixi" Dixon, is translated as "What I have said I have said".

The patronym, Dikson, first appears in the Subsidy Rolls of Cumberland in 1332 and appears to be unrelated to the Earl Marshal of Scotland.

== People ==
=== A–D ===
- Aaron Dixon (born 1949), American activist
- Abram Dixon (1787–1875), New York politician
- Adrian Dixon (born 1948), radiologist and Master of Peterhouse, Cambridge
- AJ Dixon (1886–1935), motorcycle pioneer and racing driver
- Alan Leonard Dixon (born 1933), English cricketer
- Alan J. Dixon (1927–2014), American senator
- Alesha Dixon (born 1978), British singer
- Alfred Cardew Dixon (1865–1936), mathematician
- Alfred Herbert Dixon (1857–1920), British businessman
- Alice Dixon Le Plongeon (1851–1910), English photographer and archaeologist
- Ailsa Dixon (1932–2017), English composer
- Ambrose Dixon, 17th-century American pioneer
- A. C. Dixon (1854–1925), American preacher
- Andrew Graham-Dixon (born 1960), British art critic
- Annie Dixon (c. 1817–1901), English painter
- Antonio Dixon (American football) (born 1985), American football player
- Archibald Dixon (1802–1876), American politician
- Arrington Dixon, American politician
- Arthur Lee Dixon (1867–1955), mathematician, younger brother of Alfred Dixon
- Bill Dixon, American jazz musician
- Brandon Dixon, American baseball player
- Callum Dixon (rower) (born 2000), British Olympic rower
- Chuck Dixon, American comic book writer
- Clarence Dixon, American murderer
- Clay Dixon, American politician
- Clint Dixon (born 1988), Canadian basketball coach
- Colin Dixon, Welsh rugby league footballer
- Collin Dixon (born 2004), American football player
- Colton Dixon, American musician
- Cromwell Dixon, American aviation pioneer
- Cyril Dixon, English footballer
- Dai'Jean Dixon (born 1998), American football player
- Daisy Dixon (born 1989), English philosopher of art
- Daniel Dixon, 2nd Baron Glentoran
- D'Cota Dixon (born 1996), American football player
- Dean Dixon, American conductor
- Dennis Dixon, American football player
- De'Shaan Dixon (born 1998), American football player
- Donna Dixon, American actress
- Dougal Dixon, Scottish geologist

=== E–J ===
- Eleanor Widener Dixon (1891–1966), American socialite and philanthropist
- Ella Hepworth Dixon (1857–1932; pseudonym, "Margaret Wynman"), English writer, novelist, editor
- Fitz Eugene Dixon Jr., American philanthropist, owner of the Philadelphia 76ers
- Floyd Dixon, American R&B pianist
- Frank M. Dixon, American politician
- Franklin W. Dixon, pseudonym used for Hardy Boys novel authors
- Fred Dixon (politician), Canadian politician
- Geoff Dixon, Australian CEO
- George Dixon (rugby league), English rugby league footballer of the 1920s and 1930s
- Chris Dixon (1943–2011), Rhodesian Air Force pilot
- Hal Dixon (biochemist) (1928–2008), Irish biochemist
- Hal Dixon (umpire) (1920–1966), American baseball umpire
- Hanford Dixon, American footballer
- Harry D. Dixon, American politician
- Harry St. John Dixon (1848–1898), American Confederate officer, lawyer, rancher
- Harry Dixon (metalsmith) (1890–1967), American metalsmith
- Henry Dixon (disambiguation)
  - Henry Hall Dixon, British sporting writer
  - Henry Horatio Dixon, Irish biologist
- Herbert Dixon, 1st Baron Glentoran
- Hewritt Dixon, American football running back
- Ida Dixon (1854–1916), American golf course architect
- Iris Dixon (1931–2022), Australian cyclist
- Isaiah Dixon (1923–2013), American politician
- Ivan Dixon, American actor
- James Dixon (conductor), American conductor
- James R. Dixon, American herpetologist
- Jamie Dixon (born 1965), American basketball coach
- Jane Holmes Dixon, Bishop of Washington
- Jeane Dixon (1904–1997), American astrologer
- Jeremiah Dixon, surveyor on the Mason–Dixon line
- Jeremy Dixon, British architect
- Jerry Dixon (actor), American actor, director, choreographer and composer
- Jess Dixon, Canadian politician
- Jessy Dixon, American gospel singer
- Joan Dixon, American actress
- Johnnie Bob Dixon (1899–1985), American baseball player
- Joseph M. Dixon, American politician
- Juan Dixon, American basketball player
- Julian C. Dixon, Californian politician

=== K–Z ===
- Kerry Dixon, English footballer
- Kyle Dixon (disambiguation), multiple people
- Lance J. Dixon (born 1961), American theoretical physicist
- Lee Dixon (actor), American actor and singer
- Lee Dixon, English footballer
- Leslie Dixon, American screenwriter
- Lisa Dixon, American psychiatry professor
- Liz Dixon (born 2000), American basketball player
- Lorna Dixon, Australian Aboriginal custodian and preserver of the Wangkumara language
- Maggie Dixon (1977–2006), American basketball coach (sister of Jamie Dixon)
- Malcolm Dixon (actor), English actor
- Malcolm Dixon (rugby league), English rugby league player
- Malcolm Dixon (biochemist), British biochemist
- Malik Dixon, American basketball player in Israel Basketball Premier League
- Marcus Dixon, American football player
- Mary J. Scarlett Dixon (1822–1900), American physician
- Matthew Charles Dixon, recipient of the Victoria cross
- Maxwell Dixon, American rapper known as Grand Puba
- Medina Dixon (1962–2021), American basketball player
- Monica Dixon, American political organiser
- Moochie Dixon (born 2001), American football player
- Mort Dixon (1892–1956), American lyricist
- Norman F. Dixon (1922–2013), British psychologist
- Dr Olaf George Dixon of ICI, patented the Dixon ring in 1943 for use in laboratory distillation applications
- Sir Owen Dixon, Chief Justice of Australia
- Patrick Dixon, British business analyst and author
- Peg Dixon (1923–2015), Canadian actress
- Peter Dixon (born 1944), English rugby union player
- Peter Dixon (economist) (born 1946), Australian economist
- Piers Dixon (1928–2017), British politician
- Rap Dixon, American baseball player
- Reg Dixon (sailor), Canadian sailor
- Reg Dixon (comedian), English comedian
- Reginald Dixon, British theatre organist
- Richard Watson Dixon, English poet
- R. Earl Dixon, American politician
- Robert M. W. Dixon (Robert Malcolm Ward Dixon), Australian linguist
- Robin Dixon, 3rd Baron Glentoran (born 1935)
- Rod Dixon, New Zealand runner
- Ron Dixon (American football), American footballer
- Roscoe Dixon (1949–2021), American politician
- Samantha Dixon (born 1965), British politician
- Scott Dixon (boxer), Scottish boxer of the 1990s, 2000s and 2010s
- Scott Dixon, racing driver from New Zealand
- Sharon Pratt Dixon, later Sharon Pratt Kelly, mayor of Washington, D.C.
- Sheila Dixon, mayor of Baltimore
- Sir Daniel Dixon, 1st Baronet (1844–1907), mayor of Belfast
- Sonny Dixon, American TV anchorman
- Stan Dixon (1894–1979), English footballer
- Thomas Homer-Dixon, Canadian political scientist
- Travis Dixon, American media studies scholar
- Tudor Dixon (born 1977), American politician and commentator
- Waliyy Dixon (born 1974), American streetball player
- Wheeler Winston Dixon, American film director
- Wilfrid Dixon (1915–2008), American mathematician and statistician
- William Hepworth Dixon, British historian
- Willie Dixon, American blues musician

== Disambiguation pages ==
- Ben Dixon (disambiguation), multiple people
- Brian Dixon (disambiguation), multiple people
- Cecil Dixon (disambiguation), multiple people
- Charles Dixon (disambiguation), multiple people
- Daniel Dixon (disambiguation) or Danny Dixon, multiple people
- David Dixon (disambiguation), multiple people
- Don Dixon (disambiguation), multiple people
- George Dixon (disambiguation), multiple people
- John Dixon (disambiguation), multiple people
- Johnny Dixon (disambiguation), multiple people
- Larry Dixon (disambiguation), multiple people
- Matthew Dixon (disambiguation), multiple people
- Michael Dixon (disambiguation), multiple people
- Paul Dixon (disambiguation), multiple people
- Richard Dixon (disambiguation), multiple people
- Robert Dixon (disambiguation), multiple people
- Stephen Dixon (disambiguation) or Steve Dixon, multiple people
- Thomas Dixon (disambiguation), multiple people
- Tom Dixon (disambiguation), multiple people

== Fictional characters ==
- Marcus Dixon (Alias), fictional character from the TV series Alias
- Daryl Dixon and Merle Dixon, fictional characters from the TV series The Walking Dead
- George Dixon, police constable in the 1950s/70s British TV series Dixon of Dock Green
- Jim Dixon, protagonist of the 1954 novel Lucky Jim

== See also ==
- Dixon v. Alabama, a landmark civil-rights case, appellant St. John Dixon
- Dixon (disambiguation)
- Dickson (surname)
