= Henry Dixon =

Henry Dixon, or Harry Dixon may refer to:

== People named Henry Dixon ==
- Hal Dixon (biochemist) (né Henry Berkeley Franks Dixon; 1928–2008), British biochemist
- Henry Dixon (Irish republican) (1918–1999) Irish republican, a founding member of Sinn Féin
- Henry Dixon (Gaelic footballer) (1918–1999), Irish Gaelic footballer
- Henry Dixon (photographer, born 1820), (1820-1893) British photographer
- Henry Dixon (photographer, born 1824), (1824-1883) British photographer and Indian Army Captain
- Henry Dixon (priest) (1874–1939), Anglican priest
- Henry Aldous Dixon (1890–1967), U.S. representative from Utah
- Henry Hall Dixon (1822–1870), English sporting writer
- Henry Horatio Dixon (1869–1953), plant biologist and professor at Trinity College Dublin

== People named Harry Dixon ==
- Harry St. John Dixon (1848–1898) American Confederate officer, lawyer, rancher
- Harry Dixon (cricketer) (born 2005), Australian cricketer
- Harry Dixon (metalsmith) (1890–1967), American metalsmith
- Harry Dixon (painter) (1861–1941) British painter and sculptor
- Harry D. Dixon (1925–2012), member of the Georgia House of Representatives

== See also ==
- Hal Dixon (disambiguation)
- Henry Dickson (disambiguation)
