= 2022 Michigan gubernatorial election =

- November 8, 2022
- Turnout: 55.2% ▼0.2
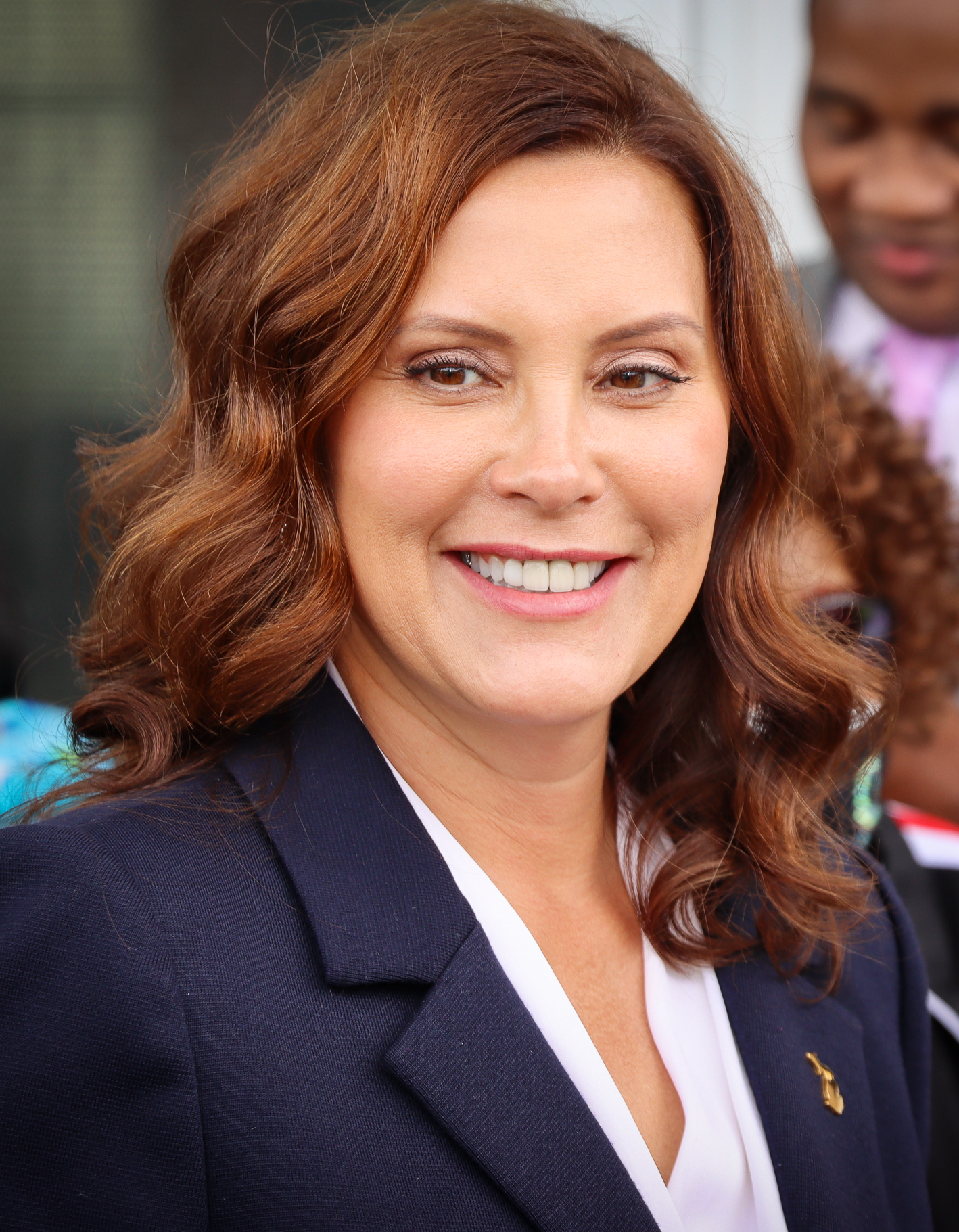

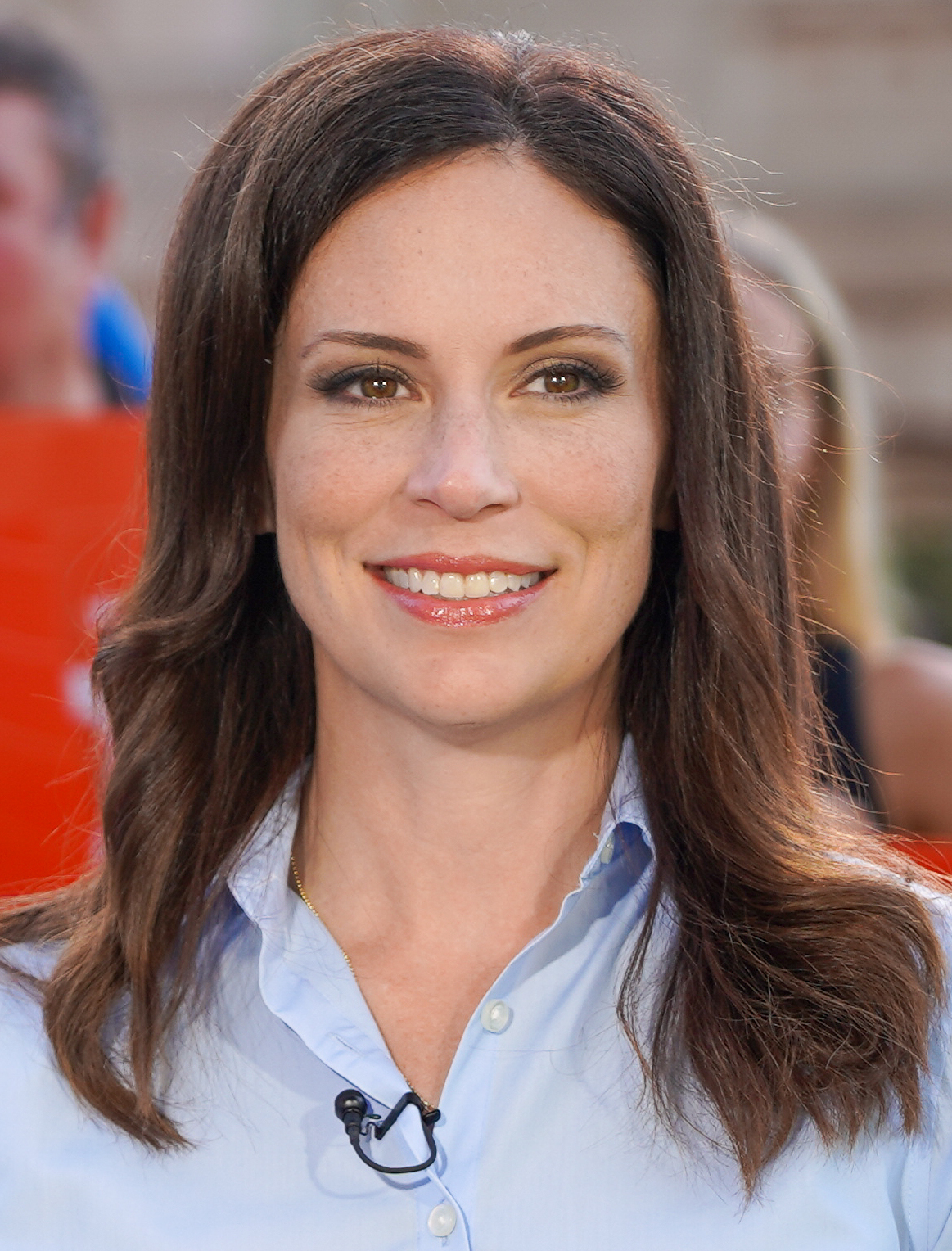
Nominee	Gretchen Whitmer	Tudor Dixon
Party	Democratic	Republican
Running mate	Garlin Gilchrist	Shane Hernandez
Popular vote	2,430,505	1,960,635
Percentage	54.47%	43.94%
- Whitmer: 40–50% 50–60% 60–70% 70–80% 80–90% >90% Dixon: 40–50% 50–60% 60–70% 70–80% 80–90%
Governor before election
Gretchen Whitmer
Democratic
Elected Governor
Gretchen Whitmer
Democratic

The 2022 Michigan gubernatorial election took place on November 8, 2022, to elect the governor of Michigan. Incumbent Democratic Governor Gretchen Whitmer ran for election to a second term, and faced former political commentator Tudor Dixon in the general election.

Whitmer defeated Dixon by a margin of nearly 11 percentage points, a wider margin than polls indicated as well as a wider margin than Whitmer's first victory four years prior. Whitmer won independent voters by double-digit margins. This was the first gubernatorial election in Michigan history in which both major party candidates were women.

== Background ==
=== Process for ballot appearance and fraud allegations ===
In order to appear on a primary ballot for the August 2 Democratic and Republican primaries, candidates must submit between 15,000 and 30,000 signatures in addition to their filing paperwork. These signatures are submitted to the Board of State Canvassers, a bipartisan and independent board that verifies petition signatures. Within seven days of the filing deadline, citizens and organizations can challenge nomination signatures submitted by candidates. Voters are only allowed to sign one nomination petition.

After the filing deadline, the Board of State Canvassers received nearly 30 challenges to nomination petitions. Among them, the Michigan Democratic Party alleged that several Republican candidates engaged in signature fraud with their petitions. This was followed by a report by the Michigan Bureau of Elections, which alleged that 36 paid signature circulators faked signatures and engaged in practices that added fraudulent signatures to other candidate's petitions.

An eight-hour meeting of the Board of State Canvassers reached a deadlock on whether to allow the candidates in question to stay on the ballot. Due to the deadlock, the candidates in question were not allowed to appear on the primary ballot. The rushed pace of the proceedings and the decision were criticized by Common Cause of Michigan, whose policy director suggested that the candidates in question had to plead their cases to the Board of Canvassers days after finding out about the alleged fraud themselves.

Several candidates filed lawsuits appealing the decision. These suits were rejected in the Michigan Court of Appeals. Three candidates appealed to the Michigan Supreme Court, but these appeals were denied.

== Democratic primary ==
=== Candidates ===
==== Nominee ====
- Gretchen Whitmer, incumbent governor (2019–present) and vice chair of the Democratic National Committee (2021–present)
  - Running mate: Garlin Gilchrist, incumbent lieutenant governor (2019–present)

=== Endorsements ===
Gretchen Whitmer

Organizations

- 314 Action
- American Federation of Teachers
- EMILY's List
- Giffords
- Jewish Democratic Council of America
- United Auto Workers

=== Results ===
Democratic primary results
Party	Candidate	Votes	%
Democratic	Gretchen Whitmer (incumbent)	938,382	100.0%
Total votes		938,382	100.0%

== Republican primary ==
Fourteen people declared their candidacy for the Republican gubernatorial nomination. At the filing deadline, 10 candidates submitted enough signatures to appear on the ballot, a state record. However, following challenges by the state Democratic party and other organizations, five candidates were deemed ineligible to appear on the ballot due to alleged fraudulent signatures. Several of these candidates, including former Detroit police chief James Craig and Michael Markey, pledged to appeal the decision to the State Supreme Court. Craig also mentioned that, should the appeal fail, he would still plan to run as a write-in candidate for both the primary and the general election. On June 15, 2022, Craig announced he was launching a write-in campaign for the nomination.

On June 9, 2022, candidate Ryan Kelley was arrested by the FBI following numerous tips that he had participated in the January 6 United States Capitol attack. The criminal complaint alleges that Kelley engaged in disorderly conduct on restricted grounds and engaged in acts of violence against a person or property. He agreed in June 2023 to plead guilty on a lesser charge in relation to his participation in the insurrection.

On August 19, 2022, Dixon announced former state representative Shane Hernandez as her running mate. However, shortly after, former gubernatorial candidates Ralph Rebandt and Garrett Soldano both announced that they were exploring the possibility of launching their own campaigns for lieutenant governor to contest Hernandez at the August 27 state GOP convention for not being conservative enough. On August 22, 2022, Soldano announced that he would not seek the position of lieutenant governor at the convention. Later that same day, Rebandt announced that he would seek the nomination at the convention. Hernandez secured his party's nomination at the convention, despite heated opposition from supporters of Rebandt.

On June 22, 2023, charges were filed against three individuals regarding the fraudulent signatures that disqualified five of the candidates in the Republican primary.

=== Candidates ===
==== Nominee ====
- Tudor Dixon, conservative media personality
  - Running mate: Shane Hernandez, former state representative from the 83rd district (2017–2021) and candidate for Michigan's 10th congressional district in 2020

==== Eliminated in primary ====
- Ryan Kelley, Allendale Township Planning commissioner
  - Running mate: Jamie Swafford, ethnic vice-chair of the Michigan Republican Party
- Ralph Rebandt, Farmington Hills pastor
- Kevin Rinke, businessman
- Garrett Soldano, chiropractor, businessman and former co-chairman of Unlock Michigan

==== Disqualified, write-in campaign ====
- Donna Brandenburg, businesswoman (became U.S. Taxpayers Party nominee after disqualification)
- Mike Brown, captain in the Michigan State Police (endorsed Kevin Rinke)
- James Craig, former chief of the Detroit Police Department (2013–2021)
- Perry Johnson, businessman
- Michael Jay Markey Jr., businessman and media personality

==== Failed to qualify ====
- Bob Scott, jelly maker and vice president of the Evangelical Alliance Ministerial Association
- Evan Space, Michigan Army National Guard veteran and candidate for governor in 2018

==== Withdrawn ====
- Articia Bomer, Detroit document specialist (ran unsuccessfully for Michigan's 13th congressional district)
- Austin Chenge, businessman and U.S. Army veteran

==== Declined ====
- Tom Barrett, state senator from the 24th district (2019–2023) (running for Michigan's 7th congressional district)
- Jack Bergman, U.S. representative for Michigan's 1st congressional district (2017–present) (running for re-election) (endorsed James Craig, later switched to Perry Johnson)
- Betsy DeVos, former U.S. secretary of education (2017–2021) and former chair of the Michigan Republican Party (1996–2000, 2003–2005)
- Bill Huizenga, U.S. representative for Michigan's 2nd congressional district (2011–present) (running for re-election) (endorsed Tudor Dixon)
- John James, businessman, former U.S. Army captain and Republican nominee for the U.S. Senate in 2018 and 2020 (running for Michigan's 10th congressional district)
- Tom Leonard, former speaker of the Michigan House of Representatives (2017–2019) and nominee for attorney general in 2018 (ran unsuccessfully for attorney general)
- Lisa McClain, U.S. representative for Michigan's 10th congressional district (2021–present) (running for re-election) (endorsed Tudor Dixon)
- Candice Miller, Macomb County Public Works commissioner (2017–present), former U.S. representative for Michigan's 10th congressional district (2003–2016), and former Michigan secretary of state (1995–2003)
- Mike Shirkey, majority leader of the Michigan Senate (2019–present) and former state representative from the 65th district (2010–2014) (endorsed Tudor Dixon)

=== Endorsements ===
Mike Brown (disqualified)

State representatives

- Beth Griffin, state representative from Michigan's 66th district (2017–present)
- Pauline Wendzel, state representative from Michigan's 79th district (2019–present)

Local officials

- Mac Elliot, Berrien County commissioner
- Scott Hodshire, Hillsdale County sheriff
- Mark Lillywhite, St. Joseph County sheriff
- Steve Pierangeli, Berrien County prosecutor

Individuals

- ~~Ted Nugent, singer-songwriter and conservative political activist~~ (switched endorsement to Rinke)
James Craig (disqualified/write-in)

U.S. representatives

- ~~Jack Bergman, U.S. representative for Michigan's 1st congressional district (2017–present)~~ (switched endorsement to Johnson)

State officials

- ~~John Engler, former governor of Michigan (1991–2003)~~ (switched endorsement to Dixon)

Mayors

- Adam Stockford, mayor of Hillsdale, Michigan (2017–present)
Tudor Dixon

U.S. executive branch officials

- Betsy DeVos, 11th secretary of education
- Donald Trump, 45th president of the United States (2017–2021)

State officials

- John Engler, former governor of Michigan (1991–2003) (previously endorsed Craig)

U.S. representatives

- Tulsi Gabbard, former U.S. representative for Hawaii's 2nd congressional district (2013–2021)
- Newt Gingrich, former speaker of the United States House of Representatives (1995–1999) and former U.S. representative for Georgia's 6th congressional district (1979–1999)
- Bill Huizenga, U.S. representative for Michigan's 2nd congressional district (2011–2023)
- Lisa McClain, U.S. representative for Michigan's 10th congressional district (2021–2023)

State senators

- Mike Shirkey, majority leader of the Michigan Senate (2019–2023)

Individuals

- Dick DeVos, businessman and nominee for governor of Michigan in 2006

Organizations

- American Conservative Union
- Veterans for Trump, aka Veterans for America First

Newspapers

- The Detroit News (Republican primary only)
Perry Johnson (disqualified)

U.S. representatives

- Jack Bergman, U.S. representative for Michigan's 1st congressional district (2017–present)
Michael Jay Markey Jr. (disqualified)

State Senators

- Tom George, former state senator for Michigan's 20th district (2003–2010)
Kevin Rinke

Individuals

- Ted Nugent, singer-songwriter and conservative political activist (previously endorsed Brown)

Newspapers

- Detroit Free Press (Republican primary only)

=== Polling ===
Aggregate polls

Source of poll aggregation	Dates administered	Dates updated	Tudor Dixon	Ryan Kelley	Kevin Rinke	Garrett Soldano	Other (Note: Calculated by taking the difference of 100% and all other candidates combined.)	Margin
Real Clear Politics	July 28 – August 1, 2022	August 1, 2022	40.7%	11.7%	20.3%	14.7%	12.6%	Dixon +20.4

Poll source	Date(s) administered	Sample size (Note: Key: A – all adults RV – registered voters LV – likely voters V – unclear)	Margin of error	Mike Brown	James Craig	Tudor Dixon	Perry Johnson	Ryan Kelley	Kevin Rinke	Garrett Soldano	Other	Undecided
The Trafalgar Group (R)	July 31 – August 1, 2022	1,074 (LV)	± 2.9%	–	–	41%	–	10%	19%	18%	2% (Note: Rebandt with 2%)	11%
Mitchell Research (R)	July 31, 2022	443 (LV)	± 4.7%	–	–	37%	–	12%	23%	12%	2%	15%
Emerson College	July 28–30, 2022	869 (LV)	± 3.3%	–	–	41%	–	12%	17%	12%	9% (Note: "Someone else" with 7%, Rebandt with 3%)	9%
The Trafalgar Group (R)	July 26–28, 2022	1,098 (LV)	± 2.9%	–	–	28%	–	14%	17%	19%	3% (Note: Rebandt with 3%)	19%
co/efficient (R) (Note: This poll was sponsored by Rinke's campaign.)	July 24–26, 2022	1,000 (LV)	± 3.1%	–	–	21%	–	–	22%	–	–	–
Mitchell Research (R)	July 24–25, 2022	436 (LV)	± 5.0%	–	–	28%	–	14%	22%	11%	1% (Note: Rebandt with 1%)	25%
Mitchell Research (R)	July 17–18, 2022	501 (LV)	± 4.4%	–	–	28%	–	15%	20%	10%	1%	26%
The Glengariff Group, Inc.	July 13–15, 2022	500 (LV)	± 4.4%	–	–	19%	–	13%	15%	12%	2%	38%
Mitchell Research (R)	July 7–8, 2022	683 (LV)	± 3.8%	–	–	26%	–	15%	13%	13%	1%	33%
Mitchell Research (R)	June 21–22, 2022	588 (LV)	± 4.0%	–	–	15%	–	13%	15%	8%	3%	46%
EPIC-MRA	June 10–13, 2022	398 (LV)	± 4.9%	–	–	5%	–	17%	12%	13%	8% (Note: Write-ins (volunteered response) with 7%, Rebandt with 1%)	45%
Target Insyght	May 26–27, 2022	400 (LV)	± 5.0%	–	–	9%	–	19%	15%	6%	1%	49%
	May 23, 2022	Board of Elections announces Brandenburg, Brown, Craig, Johnson, and Markey did not file enough valid signatures to appear on the ballot										
The Glengariff Group, Inc.	April 29 – May 1, 2022	500 (LV)	± 4.4%	2%	23%	2%	5%	5%	6%	8%	3% (Note: Brandenburg with 2%, Rebandt with 1%, Markey with 0%)	44%
The Trafalgar Group (R)	March 29–31, 2022	1,072 (LV)	± 3.0%	2%	34%	3%	16%	7%	2%	15%	8%	12%
	March 3, 2022	Chenge withdraws from the race										
Mitchell Research (R)	February 17–19, 2022	539 (LV)	± 4.2%	3%	32%	4%	3%	4%	5%	10%	3%	37%
Strategic National (R) (Note: Poll sponsored by Craig's campaign)	September 18–19, 2021	400 (LV)	± 4.9%	–	38%	1%	–	1%	0%	8%	2% (Note: Chenge with 2%)	50%
Strategic National (R)	September 18–19, 2021	400 (LV)	± 4.9%	–	40%	1%	–	–	0%	10%	–	49%

Hypothetical polling

John James vs. James Craig

Poll source	Date(s) administered	Sample size	Margin of error	John James	James Craig	Undecided
Target Insyght	May 9–11, 2021	304 (RV)	± 3.5%	36%	21%	42%

=== Results ===
Results by county Dixon: 30–40%; 40–50%; 50–60%; Rinke: 30–40%; 40–50%

Republican primary results
Party	Candidate	Votes	%
Republican	Tudor Dixon	436,350	39.69%
Republican	Kevin Rinke	236,306	21.50%
Republican	Garrett Soldano	192,442	17.51%
Republican	Ryan Kelley	165,587	15.06%
Republican	Ralph Rebandt	45,046	4.10%
Write-in		23,542	2.14%
Total votes		1,099,273	100.0%

== Libertarian convention ==
=== Candidates ===
==== Nominated ====
- Mary Buzuma, nominee for governor in 2014
  - Running mate: Brian Ellison, nominee for Michigan's 8th congressional district in 2018

== Constitution convention ==
=== Candidates ===
==== Nominee ====
- Donna Brandenburg, businesswoman (nominated following disqualification from GOP ballot)
  - Running mate: Mellissa Carone, 2020 election hearing witness for Rudy Giuliani

== General election ==
=== Predictions ===
Source	Ranking	As of
The Cook Political Report	Lean D	October 28, 2022
Inside Elections	Tilt D	March 4, 2022
Sabato's Crystal Ball	Lean D	November 7, 2022
Politico	Lean D	May 23, 2022
RCP	Tossup	October 21, 2022
Fox News	Lean D	August 22, 2022
538	Likely D	November 8, 2022
Elections Daily	Lean D	November 7, 2022

=== Post-primary endorsements ===
Gretchen Whitmer (D)

U.S. executive branch officials

- Joe Biden, 46th president of the United States (2021–2025), 47th vice president of the United States (2009–2017), U.S. senator from Delaware (1973–2009)
- Pete Buttigieg, 19th United States secretary of transportation (2021–2025), and mayor of South Bend, Indiana (2012–2020)
- Kamala Harris, 49th vice president of the United States (2021–2025), U.S. senator from California (2017–2021)
- Barack Obama, 44th president of the United States (2009–2017), U.S. senator from Illinois (2005–2008)

U.S. senators

- Cory Booker, U.S. senator from New Jersey (2013–present)
- Gary Peters, U.S. senator from Michigan (2015–present)
- Bernie Sanders, U.S. senator from Vermont (2007–present) (Independent)
- Debbie Stabenow, U.S. senator from Michigan (2001–2025)

U.S. representatives

- Joe Schwarz, U.S. representative for Michigan's 7th congressional district (2005–2007) (Independent, former Republican)

State officials

- Richard H. Bernstein, Associate Justice of the Michigan Supreme Court (2015–present)
- J. B. Pritzker, Governor of Illinois (2019–present)

State senators

- Melvin L. Larsen, former state senator (Republican)
- Tory Rocca, former state senator for Michigan's 10th district (Republican)

State representatives

- Kyra Harris Bolden, state representative from Michigan's 35th district
- Doug Hart, former state representative from Michigan's 73rd district (Republican)
- Mike Pumford, former state representative from Michigan's 100th district (Republican)

Local officials

- Mike Duggan, mayor of Detroit (2014–2026)

Individuals

- Magic Johnson, former professional basketball player
- William U. Parfet, businessman and philanthropist (Republican)
- Kerry Washington, actress

Newspapers

- Detroit Free Press
- The Michigan Daily

Organizations

- AFSCME Council 25
- Detroit Regional Chamber of Commerce
- End Citizens United
- Human Rights Campaign
- League of Conservation Voters
- Let America Vote
- Michigan AFL-CIO
- Michigan Association of Police Organizations
- Michigan Education Association
- NARAL Pro-Choice America
- National Wildlife Federation
- Sierra Club of Michigan
Tudor Dixon (R)

U.S. executive branch officials

- Kellyanne Conway, senior counselor to the president (2017–2020)
- Mike Pence, 48th vice president of the United States (2017–2021)

State officials

- Doug Ducey, governor of Arizona (2015–2023)
- Kristi Noem, governor of South Dakota (2019–2025)
- Glenn Youngkin, governor of Virginia (2022–2026)

U.S. representatives

- Marjorie Taylor Greene, U.S. representative for Georgia's 14th congressional district (2021–2026)

Individuals

- Mellissa Carone, nominee for lieutenant governor of Michigan in 2022; 2020 election hearing witness for Rudy Giuliani (Constitution Party)
- Brian Kilmeade, conservative political commentator
- Kari Lake, former news anchor and nominee for governor of Arizona in 2022
- Donald Trump Jr., businessman and former television personality

Newspapers

- The Detroit News

Organizations

- Michigan Farm Bureau
- National Federation of Independent Business – Michigan
- Right to Life of Michigan
Declined to endorse

State officials

- Brian Calley, former lieutenant governor of Michigan (2011–2019) (Republican)

Local officials

- James Craig, former chief of the Detroit Police Department (2013–2021), former chief of the Cincinnati Police Department (2011–2013), former chief of the Portland Police Department (2009–2011), candidate for governor of Michigan in 2022 (Republican)

Organizations

- Michigan Chamber of Commerce (withdrew endorsement of Dixon from the primary)
- Small Business Association of Michigan

=== Polling ===
Aggregate polls

Source of poll aggregation	Dates administered	Dates updated	Gretchen Whitmer (D)	Tudor Dixon (R)	Other (Note: Calculated by taking the difference of 100% and all other candidates combined.)	Margin
Real Clear Politics	October 30 – November 7, 2022	November 8, 2022	48.3%	47.3%	4.4%	Whitmer +1.0
FiveThirtyEight	January 3 – November 8, 2022	November 8, 2022	49.9%	45.1%	5.0%	Whitmer +4.8
270toWin	November 3–7, 2022	November 8, 2022	50.4%	46.4%	3.2%	Whitmer +4.0
Average			49.5%	46.3%	4.2%	Whitmer +3.2

Poll source	Date(s) administered	Sample size	Margin of error	Gretchen Whitmer (D)	Tudor Dixon (R)	Other	Undecided
The Trafalgar Group (R)	November 5–7, 2022	1,097 (LV)	± 2.9%	48%	49%	1% (Note: Buzuma (L) with 1%; "Other" with 1%)	2%
Cygnal (R)	November 1–4, 2022	1,603 (LV)	± 2.5%	50%	47%	2% (Note: "Third party candidate" with 2%)	1%
Mitchell Research	November 3, 2022	658 (LV)	± 3.8%	50%	48%	1% (Note: "Another candidate" with 1%)	2%
Cygnal (R)	October 31 – November 2, 2022	1,754 (LV)	± 2.3%	51%	46%	2% (Note: "Third party candidate" with 2%)	2%
EPIC-MRA	October 28 – November 1, 2022	600 (LV)	± 4.0%	54%	43%	1% (Note: Buzuma (L) with 1%)	2%
Emerson College	October 27–31, 2022	1,584 (LV)	± 2.5%	50%	45%	3% (Note: Buzuma (L) with 2%; Hogan (G) with 1%; Brandenburg (UTP) with <1%; Simpson (NL) with <1%)	3%
Emerson College	October 27–31, 2022	1,584 (LV)	± 2.5%	51%	46%	3% (Note: Buzuma (L) with 2%; Hogan (G) with 1%; Brandenburg (UTP) with <1%)	–
Cygnal (R)	October 27–31, 2022	1,584 (LV)	± 2.5%	51%	45%	2% (Note: "Third party candidate" with 2%)	3%
InsiderAdvantage (R) (Note: This poll was sponsored by American Greatness, a conservative news outlet.)	October 30, 2022	550 (LV)	± 4.2%	45%	45%	5% (Note: Buzuma (L) with 2%; Hogan (G) with 2%; "Another candidate" with 1%)	5%
Wick Insights	October 26–30, 2022	1,137 (LV)	± 3.2%	49%	47%	2% (Note: "Someone else" with 2%)	2%
KAConsulting (R) (Note: Poll conducted for Citizens United, a conservative non-profit organization.)	October 27–29, 2022	501 (LV)	± 4.4%	48%	41%	5% (Note: "Other/Refused" with 5%)	7%
Cygnal (R)	October 25–29, 2022	1,543 (LV)	± 2.5%	51%	44%	2% (Note: "Third party candidate" with 2%)	3%
The Glengariff Group, Inc.	October 26–28, 2022	600 (LV)	± 4.0%	52%	43%	3%	2%
Cygnal (R)	October 23–27, 2022	1,822 (LV)	± 2.3%	51%	44%	3% (Note: "Third party candidate" with 3%)	2%
Cygnal (R)	October 21–25, 2022	1,378 (LV)	± 2.6%	51%	45%	3% (Note: "Third party candidate" with 3%)	2%
Cygnal (R)	October 19–23, 2022	1,459 (LV)	± 2.6%	50%	44%	3% (Note: "Third party candidate" with 3%)	3%
The Trafalgar Group (R)	October 18–21, 2022	1,022 (LV)	± 2.9%	48%	48%	2% (Note: Buzuma (L) with 2%; "Other" with <1%)	2%
Cygnal (R)	October 17–21, 2022	1,904 (LV)	± 2.3%	50%	44%	3% (Note: "Third party candidate" with 3%)	4%
Mitchell Research	October 19, 2022	541 (LV)	± 4.2%	49%	47%	1% (Note: "Another candidate" with 1%)	3%
Cygnal (R)	October 15–19, 2022	1,793 (LV)	± 2.3%	49%	44%	3% (Note: "Third party candidate" with 3%)	4%
CNN/SSRS	October 13–18, 2022	901 (RV)	± 4.2%	55%	41%	4% (Note: "Neither" with 3%; "Other with 1%)	1%
CNN/SSRS	October 13–18, 2022	651 (LV)	± 4.9%	52%	46%	2% (Note: "Neither" with 2%)	–
Emerson College	October 12–14, 2022	580 (LV)	± 4.0%	49%	44%	3% (Note: Brandenburg (UTP) with 2%; Buzuma (L) with 1%; Hogan (G) with 0%)	4%
Cygnal (R) (Note: This poll was sponsored by the Michigan Association of Broadcasters.)	October 12–14, 2022	640 (LV)	± 3.9%	49%	44%	4% (Note: "Third party candidate" with 4%)	4%
Wick Insights (R)	October 8–14, 2022	1,136 (LV)	± 3.1%	47%	48%	2% (Note: "Someone else" with 2%)	3%
InsiderAdvantage (R)	October 12, 2022	550 (LV)	± 4.2%	44%	44%	6% (Note: Buzuma (L) with 3%; Hogan (G) with 2%; "Another candidate" with 1%)	7%
EPIC-MRA	October 6–12, 2022	600 (LV)	± 4.0%	49%	38%	4% (Note: Buzuma (L) with 3%; Hogan (G) with 1%; Brandenburg (UTP) with <1%; Simpson (NL) with <1%)	9%
YouGov/CBS News	October 3–6, 2022	1,285 (RV)	± 3.6%	53%	47%	–	–
The Glengariff Group, Inc.	September 26–29, 2022	600 (LV)	± 4.0%	50%	32%	9% (Note: Buzuma with 4%; "Refused to answer" with 3%; Hogan, Brandenburg, and Simpson with 1%)	9%
The Trafalgar Group (R)	September 24–28, 2022	1,075 (LV)	± 2.9%	51%	45%	4% (Note: Buzuma with 3%; "Other" with 1%)	1%
EPIC-MRA (Note: Poll conducted for WJRT-TV and the Detroit Free Press.)	September 15–19, 2022	600 (LV)	± 4.0%	55%	39%	–	6%
EPIC-MRA (Note: Poll conducted for MIRS, Governmental Consultant Services Inc., and the Life Insurance Association of Michigan.)	September 7–13, 2022	800 (LV)	± 3.5%	51%	40%	7% (Note: "Third party candidate" with 7%)	2%
The Glengariff Group, Inc.	August 29 – September 1, 2022	600 (LV)	± 4.0%	48%	35%	4%	13%
The Trafalgar Group (R)	August 22–25, 2022	1,080 (LV)	± 2.9%	49%	45%	3% (Note: Buzuma with 2%; "Other" with 1%)	2%
EPIC-MRA	August 18–23, 2022	600 (LV)	± 4.0%	50%	39%	–	11%
Blueprint Polling (D)	August 15–16, 2022	611 (LV)	± 4.0%	51%	39%	3%	8%
Fabrizio Ward (R)/Impact Research (D)	August 8–14, 2022	1,365 (LV)	± 4.4%	51%	46%	–	3%
The Glengariff Group, Inc.	July 5–8, 2022	600 (LV)	± 4.0%	51%	40%	–	9%
Target Insyght	May 26–27, 2022	600 (RV)	± 4.0%	58%	21%	–	21%
The Glengariff Group, Inc.	January 3–7, 2022	600 (LV)	± 4.0%	50%	31%	–	19%
Strategic National (R)	September 18–19, 2021	600 (LV)	± 4.0%	46%	41%	–	13%

Hypothetical polling

Gretchen Whitmer vs. Ryan Kelley

Poll source	Date(s) administered	Sample size	Margin of error	Gretchen Whitmer (D)	Ryan Kelley (R)	Undecided
The Glengariff Group, Inc.	July 5–8, 2022	600 (LV)	± 4.0%	50%	41%	9%
Target Insyght	May 26–27, 2022	600 (RV)	± 4.0%	57%	23%	19%

Gretchen Whitmer vs. Ralph Rebandt

Poll source	Date(s) administered	Sample size	Margin of error	Gretchen Whitmer (D)	Ralph Rebandt (R)	Undecided
The Glengariff Group, Inc.	July 5–8, 2022	600 (LV)	± 4.0%	52%	37%	10%
Target Insyght	May 26–27, 2022	600 (RV)	± 4.0%	58%	19%	23%

Gretchen Whitmer vs. Kevin Rinke

Poll source	Date(s) administered	Sample size	Margin of error	Gretchen Whitmer (D)	Kevin Rinke (R)	Undecided
The Glengariff Group, Inc.	July 5–8, 2022	600 (LV)	± 4.0%	52%	40%	8%
Target Insyght	May 26–27, 2022	600 (RV)	± 4.0%	58%	24%	18%
The Glengariff Group, Inc.	January 3–7, 2022	600 (LV)	± 4.0%	50%	33%	17%

Gretchen Whitmer vs. Garrett Soldano

Poll source	Date(s) administered	Sample size	Margin of error	Gretchen Whitmer (D)	Garrett Soldano (R)	Undecided
The Glengariff Group, Inc.	July 5–8, 2022	600 (LV)	± 4.0%	52%	38%	10%
Target Insyght	May 26–27, 2022	600 (RV)	± 4.0%	58%	22%	20%
The Glengariff Group, Inc.	January 3–7, 2022	600 (LV)	± 4.0%	50%	33%	17%

Gretchen Whitmer vs. James Craig

Poll source	Date(s) administered	Sample size	Margin of error	Gretchen Whitmer (D)	James Craig (R)	Undecided
Blueprint Polling (D)	February 1–4, 2022	632 (LV)	± 3.9%	44%	44%	12%
EPIC-MRA	January 15–20, 2022	600 (LV)	± 4.0%	46%	41%	13%
The Glengariff Group, Inc.	January 3–7, 2022	600 (LV)	± 4.0%	49%	39%	12%
ARW Strategies (R)	January 4–6, 2022	800 (LV)	± 3.5%	46%	46%	8%
Strategic National (R)	September 18–19, 2021	600 (LV)	± 4.0%	47%	46%	7%
The Trafalgar Group (R)	September 13–15, 2021	1,097 (LV)	± 3.0%	44%	50%	5%
EPIC-MRA	August 9–15, 2021	600 (LV)	± 4.0%	45%	44%	11%
Competitive Edge Research & Communication (R) (Note: This poll was sponsored by the Michigan Republican Party.)	May 26 – June 4, 2021	809 (LV)	± 4.0%	38%	45%	17%
Target Insyght	May 9–11, 2021	800 (RV)	± 3.5%	48%	42%	10%

Gretchen Whitmer vs. John James

Poll source	Date(s) administered	Sample size	Margin of error	Gretchen Whitmer (D)	John James (R)	Undecided
Competitive Edge Research & Communication (R)	May 26 – June 4, 2021	809 (LV)	± 4.0%	50%	45%	5%
Target Insyght	May 9–11, 2021	800 (RV)	± 3.5%	49%	39%	12%

Gretchen Whitmer vs. Candice Miller

Poll source	Date(s) administered	Sample size	Margin of error	Gretchen Whitmer (D)	Candice Miller (R)	Other	Undecided
EPIC-MRA	February 19–25, 2021	600 (LV)	± 4.0%	46%	45%	–	9%
Denno Research	December 14–15, 2020	600 (V)	± 4.0%	46%	42%	13% (Note: Includes Undecided)	–

Gretchen Whitmer vs. generic Republican

Poll source	Date(s) administered	Sample size	Margin of error	Gretchen Whitmer (D)	Generic Republican	Undecided
EPIC-MRA	May 11–17, 2022	600 (LV)	± 4.0%	45%	46%	9%
ARW Strategies (R) (Note: Poll sponsored by DePerno's campaign for attorney general)	April 18–20, 2022	600 (LV)	± 4.0%	45%	46%	8%
Cygnal (R)	June 2–6, 2021	600 (LV)	± 4.0%	41%	52%	7%

Gretchen Whitmer vs. generic opponent

Poll source	Date(s) administered	Sample size	Margin of error	Gretchen Whitmer (D)	Generic Opponent	Undecided
The Glengariff Group, Inc.	February 3–6, 2021	600 (LV)	± 4.0%	39%	41% (Note: "Elect someone new" as opposed to "re-elect Whitmer" with 41%)	20% (Note: "It depends" with 14%; Undecided with 6%)

=== Debates ===
2022 Michigan gubernatorial general election debates
No.	Date	Host	Moderator	Link	Democratic	Republican
Key: P Participant A Absent N Non-invitee I Invitee W Withdrawn						
Key: P Participant A Absent N Non-invitee I Invitee W Withdrawn					Whitmer	Dixon
1	Oct. 13, 2022	WOOD-TV	Rick Albin	WOOD-TV	P	P
2	Oct. 25, 2022			WXYZ-TV	P	P

The first debate was held on Thursday, October 13 in Grand Rapids hosted by local TV station WOOD-TV. The two clashed on various issues such as abortion, the economy and COVID-19. Analysts determined this debate to be a draw.

The second debate was held on Tuesday, October 25 on the campus of Oakland University in Rochester. The debate was co-sponsored by Oakland University's Center for Civic Engagement and E.W. Scripps owned TV stations WXYZ-TV in Detroit, WXMI-TV in Grand Rapids and WSYM-TV in Lansing. News stories about the debate specifically noted a question Whitmer gave Dixon when they argued on school safety and library books: "Do you really think books are more dangerous than guns?"

=== Fundraising ===
Campaign finance reports as of October 23, 2022
Candidate	Raised	Spent	Cash on hand
Gretchen Whitmer (D)	$36,375,114	$30,507,077	$4,017,640
Tudor Dixon (R)	$6,764,321	$3,799,440	$2,964,881
Source: Michigan Department of State

=== Results ===
2022 Michigan gubernatorial election
Party	Candidate	Votes	%	±%
Democratic	Gretchen Whitmer (incumbent); Garlin Gilchrist (incumbent)	2,430,505	54.47%	+1.16%
Republican	Tudor Dixon; Shane Hernandez	1,960,635	43.94%	+0.19%
Libertarian	Mary Buzuma; Brian Ellison	38,800	0.87%	−0.46%
Constitution	Donna Brandenburg; Mellissa Carone	16,246	0.36%	−0.33%
Green	Kevin Hogan; Destiny Clayton	10,766	0.24%	−0.44%
Natural Law	Daryl M. Simpson; Doug Dern	4,973	0.11%	−0.13%
Write-in		47	0.00%	±0.0%
Total votes		4,461,972	100.0%	
Turnout		4,500,400	55.19%	
Registered electors		8,154,832		
Democratic hold				

==== By county ====
County	Gretchen Whitmer Democratic		Tudor Dixon Republican		Other Votes		Margin		Total votes
County	%	#	%	#	%	#	%	#	Total votes
Alcona	34.71%	2,076	63.57%	3,802	1.72%	103	−28.86%	−1,726	5,981
Alger	45.86%	1,984	52.20%	2,258	1.94%	84	−6.34%	−274	4,326
Allegan	39.76%	22,802	58.58%	33,590	1.66%	950	−18.82%	−10,788	57,342
Alpena	41.34%	5,779	56.65%	7,920	2.01%	281	−15.31%	−2,141	13,980
Antrim	42.36%	5,937	55.85%	7,827	1.78%	250	−13.49%	−1,890	14,014
Arenac	37.78%	2,709	60.17%	4,314	2.05%	147	−22.39%	−1,605	7,170
Baraga	38.59%	1,329	59.70%	2,056	1.71%	59	−21.11%	−727	3,444
Barry	37.63%	11,552	60.42%	18,547	1.95%	598	−22.79%	−6,995	30,697
Bay	50.36%	24,783	47.65%	23,448	1.99%	978	2.71%	1,335	49,209
Benzie	50.95%	5,446	47.38%	5,064	1.67%	179	3.57%	382	10,689
Berrien	46.55%	29,803	51.79%	33,157	1.66%	1064	−5.24%	−3,354	64,024
Branch	35.19%	5,676	62.81%	10,132	2.00%	322	−27.62%	−4,456	16,130
Calhoun	48.31%	24,916	49.82%	25,694	1.87%	966	−1.51%	−778	51,576
Cass	36.11%	7,350	62.23%	12,666	1.66%	337	−26.12%	−5,316	20,353
Charlevoix	45.87%	6,728	52.27%	7,667	1.87%	274	−6.40%	−939	14,669
Cheboygan	40.18%	5,357	57.80%	7,707	2.02%	270	−17.62%	−2,350	13,334
Chippewa	43.36%	6,303	54.36%	7,902	2.28%	332	−11.00%	−1,599	14,537
Clare	38.32%	5,057	59.48%	7,850	2.20%	291	−21.16%	−2,793	13,198
Clinton	50.15%	20,664	48.31%	19,904	1.54%	636	1.84%	760	41,204
Crawford	40.65%	2,655	57.08%	3,728	2.27%	148	−16.43%	−1,073	6,531
Delta	39.73%	6,890	58.23%	10,097	2.04%	354	−18.50%	−3,207	17,341
Dickinson	35.96%	4,310	62.12%	7,446	1.92%	230	−26.16%	−3,136	11,986
Eaton	53.78%	28,806	44.49%	23,828	1.73%	924	9.29%	4,978	53,558
Emmet	48.37%	9,285	49.96%	9,590	1.67%	320	−1.59%	−305	19,195
Genesee	58.47%	100,325	39.79%	68,282	1.74%	2,987	18.68%	32,043	171,594
Gladwin	36.77%	4,422	61.18%	7,357	2.05%	246	−24.41%	−2,935	12,025
Gogebic	45.47%	2,940	52.78%	3,413	1.75%	113	−7.31%	−473	6,466
Grand Traverse	52.38%	27,396	45.90%	24,005	1.72%	901	6.48%	3,391	52,302
Gratiot	41.01%	6,285	56.51%	8,659	2.48%	380	−15.50%	−2,374	15,324
Hillsdale	29.89%	5,575	67.80%	12,644	2.31%	431	−37.91%	−7,069	18,650
Houghton	45.41%	7,030	52.51%	8,128	2.08%	322	−7.10%	−1,098	15,480
Huron	35.39%	5,310	62.61%	9,395	2.01%	301	−27.22%	−4,085	15,006
Ingham	69.23%	82,408	29.29%	34,869	1.48%	1,765	39.94%	47,539	119,042
Ionia	39.86%	10,845	58.02%	15,786	2.12%	577	−18.16%	−4,941	27,208
Iosco	41.69%	5,266	56.30%	7,111	2.01%	254	−14.61%	−1,845	12,631
Iron	39.79%	2,236	58.40%	3,282	1.81%	102	−18.61%	−1,046	5,620
Isabella	52.51%	12,581	45.61%	10,927	1.87%	449	6.90%	1,654	23,957
Jackson	44.84%	29,011	53.22%	34,439	1.94%	1,255	−8.38%	−5,428	64,705
Kalamazoo	62.10%	72,516	36.34%	42,436	1.56%	1,824	25.76%	30,080	116,776
Kalkaska	33.98%	3,009	63.43%	5,616	2.59%	229	−29.45%	−2,607	8,854
Kent	54.32%	162,899	44.08%	132,172	1.60%	4,801	10.24%	30,727	299,872
Keweenaw	47.91%	666	50.43%	701	1.65%	23	−2.52%	−35	1,390
Lake	39.56%	2,081	58.08%	3,055	2.36%	124	−18.52%	−974	5,260
Lapeer	36.49%	15,983	61.50%	26,940	2.01%	879	−25.01%	−10,957	43,802
Leelanau	55.19%	8,540	43.63%	6,752	1.18%	182	11.56%	1,788	15,474
Lenawee	42.58%	18,248	55.52%	23,796	1.90%	813	−12.94%	−5,548	42,857
Livingston	42.75%	46,524	55.58%	60,494	1.67%	1,821	−12.83%	−13,970	108,839
Luce	33.22%	786	64.24%	1,520	2.54%	60	−31.02%	−734	2,366
Mackinac	42.79%	2,567	55.43%	3,325	1.78%	107	−12.64%	−758	5,999
Macomb	51.82%	199,277	46.62%	179,258	1.56%	6,009	5.20%	20,019	384,544
Manistee	47.65%	6,026	50.32%	6,364	2.02%	256	−2.67%	−338	12,646
Marquette	60.19%	18,880	38.15%	11,967	1.66%	522	22.04%	6,913	31,369
Mason	43.49%	6,419	54.32%	8,018	2.19%	324	−10.83%	−1,599	14,761
Mecosta	39.22%	6,867	58.61%	10,262	2.18%	381	−19.39%	−3,395	17,510
Menominee	34.59%	3,347	63.34%	6,129	2.07%	200	−28.75%	−2,782	9,676
Midland	47.30%	19,497	50.85%	20,964	1.85%	763	−3.55%	−1,467	41,224
Missaukee	26.79%	1,995	71.24%	5,306	1.97%	147	−44.45%	−3,311	7,448
Monroe	42.73%	29,482	55.53%	38,312	1.74%	1,203	−12.80%	−8,830	68,997
Montcalm	36.45%	9,622	61.24%	16,165	2.30%	608	−24.79%	−6,543	26,395
Montmorency	33.23%	1,701	64.49%	3,301	2.29%	117	−31.26%	−1,600	5,119
Muskegon	53.19%	39,269	44.86%	33,121	1.95%	1,443	8.33%	6,148	73,833
Newaygo	32.59%	7,417	65.37%	14,879	2.04%	465	−32.78%	−7,462	22,761
Oakland	60.92%	383,895	37.84%	238,448	1.25%	7,862	23.08%	145,447	630,205
Oceana	39.88%	4,820	58.02%	7,012	2.10%	254	−18.14%	−2,192	12,086
Ogemaw	35.71%	3,532	62.18%	6,151	2.11%	209	−26.47%	−2,619	9,892
Ontonagon	40.47%	1,319	57.13%	1,862	2.39%	78	−16.66%	−543	3,259
Osceola	30.58%	3,174	67.00%	6,954	2.43%	251	−36.42%	−3,780	10,379
Oscoda	33.77%	1,355	63.63%	2,553	2.59%	104	−29.86%	−1,198	4,012
Otsego	38.53%	4,818	59.35%	7,422	2.12%	265	−20.82%	−2,604	12,505
Ottawa	40.26%	58,952	58.29%	85,361	1.45%	2,119	−18.03%	−26,409	146,432
Presque Isle	40.85%	2,981	57.07%	4,165	2.08%	152	−16.22%	−1,184	7,298
Roscommon	40.80%	5,284	57.07%	7,391	2.13%	276	−16.27%	−2,107	12,951
Saginaw	53.00%	43,219	45.37%	37,002	1.63%	1,329	7.63%	6,217	81,550
Sanilac	31.73%	5,967	66.33%	12,473	1.94%	364	−34.60%	−6,506	18,804
Schoolcraft	39.27%	1,527	58.23%	2,264	2.49%	97	−18.96%	−737	3,888
Shiawassee	45.46%	14,730	52.37%	16,969	2.17%	703	−6.91%	−2,239	32,402
St. Clair	40.49%	30,170	57.35%	42,731	2.15%	1,604	−16.86%	−12,561	74,505
St. Joseph	38.35%	8,402	59.60%	13,059	2.05%	449	−21.25%	−4,657	21,910
Tuscola	35.06%	8,418	62.81%	15,078	2.13%	511	−27.75%	−6,660	24,007
Van Buren	48.08%	15,347	50.04%	15,974	1.88%	601	−1.96%	−627	31,922
Washtenaw	75.15%	135,904	23.67%	42,804	1.18%	2,140	51.48%	93,100	180,848
Wayne	70.86%	457,601	27.95%	180,487	1.18%	7,651	42.91%	277,114	645,739
Wexford	37.37%	5,645	60.45%	9,131	2.18%	329	−23.08%	−3,486	15,105
Totals	54.47%	2,430,505	43.94%	1,960,635	1.59%	70,832	10.53%	469,870	4,461,972

Counties that flipped from Democratic to Republican

- Gogebic (largest city: Ironwood)

Counties that flipped from Republican to Democratic

- Benzie (largest city: Frankfort)
- Grand Traverse (largest city: Traverse City)

==== By congressional district ====
Whitmer won nine of 13 congressional districts, including two that elected Republicans.

District	Whitmer	Dixon	Representative
1st	44%	54%	Jack Bergman
2nd	40%	58%	John Moolenaar
3rd	55%	43%	Peter Meijer (117th Congress)
3rd	55%	43%	Hillary Scholten (118th Congress)
4th	50%	49%	Bill Huizenga
5th	41%	57%	Tim Walberg
6th	66%	32%	Debbie Dingell
7th	54%	44%	Elissa Slotkin
8th	55%	43%	Dan Kildee
9th	41%	57%	Lisa McClain
10th	55%	43%	John James
11th	64%	35%	Haley Stevens
12th	76%	23%	Rashida Tlaib
13th	77%	22%	Shri Thanedar

== Analysis ==
Whitmer led Dixon in most of the polls. Most Republican donors chose not to fund campaign ads for Dixon, causing the TV airwaves to be dominated by ads for Whitmer, which included negative ads against Dixon. Whitmer also spent a lot more in digital advertising compared to Dixon. Abortion rights, which were on the ballot in the same election, were the subject of negative ads against Dixon, who opposed abortion rights. Although aggregate polling had Whitmer up by about 3%, and a last-minute poll by Trafalgar Group had Dixon ahead by 1%, the election was not close. Whitmer defeated Dixon at the same time Michigan voters approved a ballot measure that would guarantee abortion rights in the Michigan constitution. Democrats swept the other statewide partisan races and won control of both the state House and state Senate. This marked the first time Democrats took control of both houses of the Michigan legislature since 1984.

Exit polls found that Whitmer won nearly 70% of college-educated White women and 94% of Black voters. This was the first election since 1990 in which the winner was from the same party as the incumbent president, and the first time that the incumbent was a Democrat since 1950.

Despite Dixon's loss, she managed to flip Gogebic County in the Upper Peninsula (which last voted for a Republican in 1998), making this the first election since 1932 where a Democrat won the Michigan governor's mansion without carrying Gogebic County. Conversely, Whitmer flipped the counties of Benzie and Grand Traverse; the last time the Democratic candidate won these counties were 2006 and 1986, respectively.

=== Exit poll ===
2022 Michigan gubernatorial election voter demographics (CNN)
Demographic subgroup	Whitmer	Dixon	% of total vote
Ideology
Liberals	97	2	27
Moderates	67	31	39
Conservatives	9	90	34
Party
Democrats	98	2	35
Republicans	7	92	32
Independents	55	42	33
Gender
Men	48	51	50
Women	62	36	50
Marital status
Married	49	51	63
Unmarried	64	34	37
Gender by marital status
Married men	43	57	32
Married women	55	44	31
Unmarried men	50	47	15
Unmarried women	74	24	21
Race/ethnicity
White	49	50	80
Black	94	6	12
Latino	72	25	4
White voters by gender
White men	43	56	41
White women	55	43	39
Age
18–29 years old	65	33	10
30–44 years old	62	36	21
45–64 years old	50	48	39
65 and older	52	47	30
2020 presidential vote
Biden	98	2	50
Trump	7	91	43
First time midterm election voter
Yes	58	39	11
No	56	43	89
Education
Never attended college	43	56	16
Some college education	56	42	30
Associate degree	54	44	14
Bachelor's degree	59	40	16
Advanced degree	65	34	18
Education by race
White college graduates	60	39	32
White no college degree	42	57	48
Non-white college graduates	74	26	6
Non-white no college degree	82	17	14
Education by gender/race
White women with college degrees	69	30	16
White women without college degrees	46	52	23
White men with college degrees	51	47	17
White men without college degrees	38	61	25
Non-white	80	20	20
Issue regarded as most important
Crime	55	42	6
Abortion	77	22	45
Inflation	29	69	28
Feelings about Roe v. Wade being overturned
Enthusiastic/satisfied	16	84	41
Dissatisfied/angry	83	16	56
Abortion should be
Legal	81	17	63
Illegal	10	89	34

== Notes ==
Partisan clients
