= Stephen Dixon =

Stephen Dixon or Steve Dixon may refer to:

- Stephen Dixon (author) (1936–2019), American author
- Stephen Dixon (cricketer) (born 1958), former English cricketer
- Stephen Dixon (ice hockey) (born 1985), Canadian professional ice hockey player
- Stephen Dixon (newsreader) (born 1974), English news presenter
- Stephen Dixon (ceramist) (born 1957), British ceramic artist
- Steve Dixon (actor) (born 1956), British actor and academic
- Steve Dixon (baseball) (born 1969), former Major League Baseball pitcher

== See also ==
- Steven Dixon, American baseball player
- Steven Dickson (disambiguation)
- Dixon (surname)
