= John Dixon =

John, Johnny, or Johnnie Dixon may refer to:

== Arts and entertainment ==
- John Dixon (engraver) (1740?–1811), Irish mezzotint engraver
- John Dixon (filmmaker) (died 1999), Australian screenwriter and director
- John Dixon (cartoonist) (1929–2015), Australian comic book artist
- John Dixon (As the World Turns), fictional American TV soap opera character
- Johnny Dixon (series), titular character of series of children's novels

== Politics and law ==
- John Dixon (1785–1857), Member of Parliament for Carlisle, England, 1847–1848
- John Dixon (trade unionist) (1828–1876), British trade unionist
- John Dixon (Wisconsin politician) (1853–1938), American businessman and politician
- John Allen Dixon Jr. (1920–2003), Associate Justice of the Louisiana Supreme Court
- John Dixon (Welsh politician) (born 1951), Welsh politician and member of Plaid Cymru
- John Dixon (judge), Australian judge
- John Dixon, appellant in the U.S. federal court decision Dixon v. Alabama

== Sports ==
- John Dixon (English sportsman) (1861–1931), Nottinghamshire cricketer and international footballer
- John Dixon (Australian rules footballer) (1887–1947), Australian rules footballer
- Johnnie Bob Dixon (1899–1985), American baseball player
- John Dixon (rugby league) (fl. 1970–2009), Australian rugby league footballer and coach
- John Henry Dixon (born 1954), English cricketer, publisher and author

== Others ==
- John Dixon (engineer) (c. 1795–1865), English railway civil engineer
- John Dixon (bishop) (1888–1972), Canadian cleric, Anglican Bishop of Montreal

== See also ==
- Jack Dixon (born 1994), Welsh rugby player
- Jonathan Dixon (disambiguation)
- John Dickson (disambiguation)
- Johnny Dixon (disambiguation), a disambiguation page for people named Johnny Dixon
