= Hal Dixon =

Hal Dixon may refer to:

- Hal Dixon (biochemist) (1928–2008), Henry Dixon, Irish biochemist
- Hal Dixon (umpire) (1920–1966), American baseball umpire

== See also ==
- Henry Dixon (disambiguation)
- Harold Dixon (disambiguation)
