= Harold Dixon =

Harold Dixon may refer to:

- Harold Baily Dixon (1852–1930), British chemist
- Harold Dixon (songwriter), American composer, lyricist and publisher
- Harold Dixon, World War II US Navy pilot who, with his crew, survived ditching in the Pacific Ocean - see Against the Sun, a 2014 film about their exploits

== See also ==
- Hal Dixon (disambiguation)
