= Steven Dickson =

Steve or Steven or Stephen Dickson may refer to:

- Steve Dickson (born 1962), Australian politician
- Stephen Dickson (1951–1991), American singer
- Stephen Dickson (executive), American aviation executive and former FAA administrator

== See also ==
- Stephen Dixon (disambiguation)
