= Henry Dixon (photographer, born 1824) =

English architectural photographer

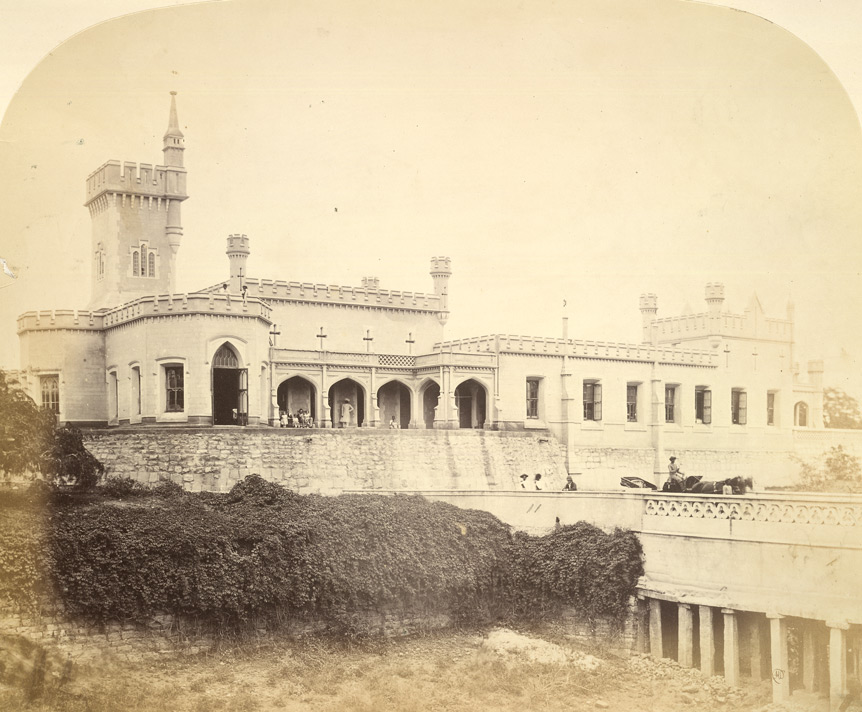
1860 photograph of Kenilworth Fort by Dixon

Henry Dixon (1824–1883) was an Italian-born English photographer and Indian Army captain best known for his architectural studies of Mysore.

== Biography ==
Dixon was born in Naples on 29 March 1824, and attended the Royal Military Academy in Woolwich, London. Sailing briefly in the General Kynd, Dixon was assigned to the 22nd Madras Native Infantry in 1842, serving until 1872. He was made a major in 1866.

=== Photography ===
During his time in India, Dixon took an interest in the photography of oriental architecture. In 1859 his photographs of the Temple of Bobaneshwar were displayed at the Bengal Photographic Society exhibition. More of his photographs were shown at the 1862 London Exhibition.

He received government funding for his architectural photography, with his 1865 series on Mysore commissioned by the Madras Government.
