= Henry Dickson =

Henry Dickson may refer to:

- Henry Seriake Dickson (born 1966), Nigerian lawyer and politician
- Henry Newton Dickson (1866–1922), Scottish geographer, meteorologist and oceanographer
- Henry Dickson (born 2007), British Animator

== See also ==
- Henry Dixon (disambiguation)
