= Matthew Dixon =

Matthew Dixon may refer to:

- Matthew Dixon (British Army officer) (1821–1905), recipient of the Victoria Cross
- Matthew Dixon (diver) (born 2000), English diver
- Matt Dixon (cricketer) (born 1992), Australian cricketer
- Matt Dixon (rugby union), Australian rugby union player
- Matty Dixon (born 1994), English footballer
