= You Great Big Handsome Marine =

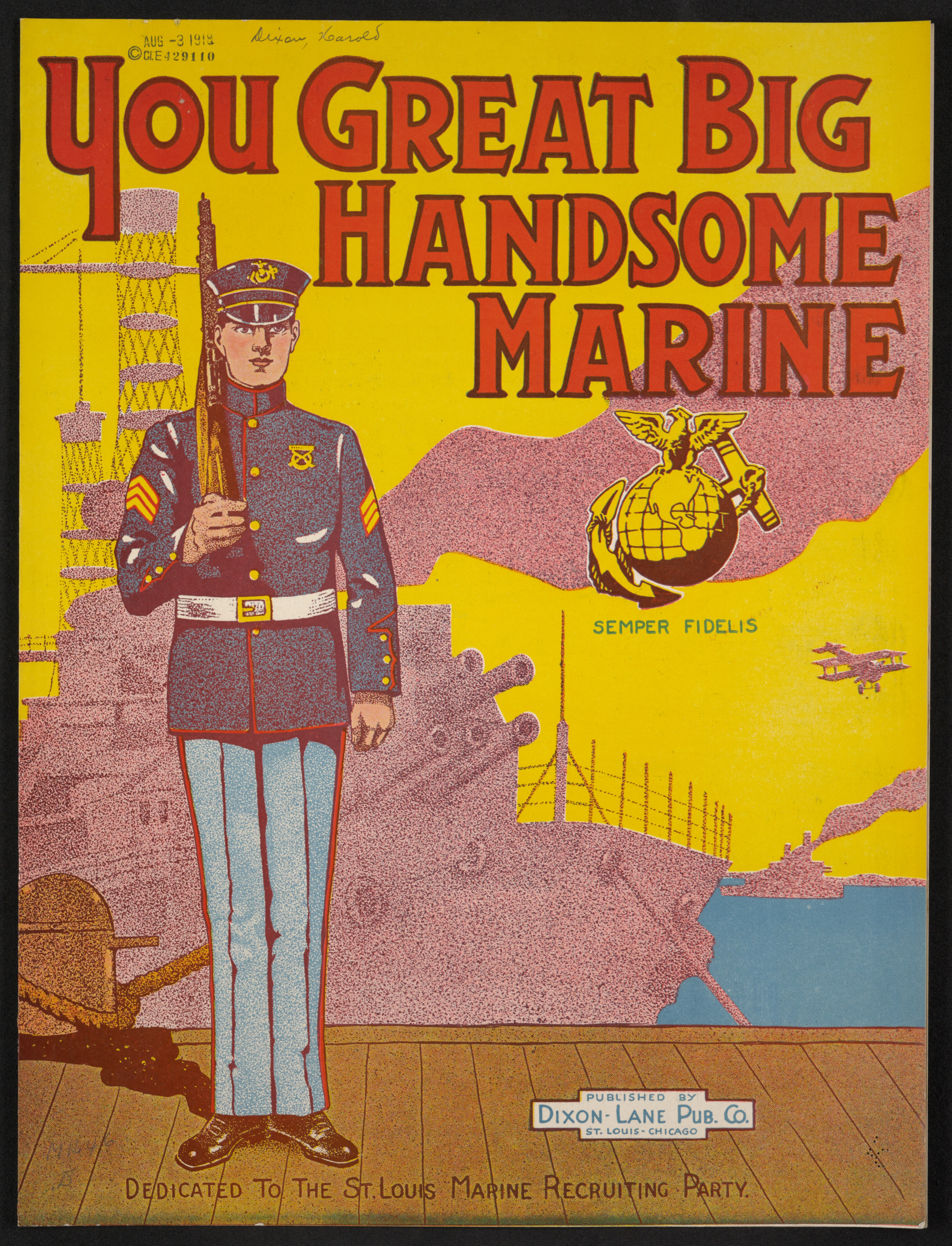

Song
- Released: 1918
- Songwriters: Composer: Harold Dixon; Lyricist: Harold Dixon, I. Chapman
- Producer: Dixon-Lane Publishers

"You Great Big Handsome Marine" is a World War I era song released in 1918. Most sources solely credit Harold Dixon as both the composer and lyricist, as it is listed on the sheet music. Other sources give composer credit to Dixon and lyricist credit to I. Chapman. The song was published by Dixon-Lane Publishers of St. Louis, Missouri. On the cover is a soldier standing at attention. A battleship is behind him, and planes are flying overhead. The song was written for both voice and piano.

The song praises Marines, and even goes as far as calling them, "the Flower of our Nation." The chorus is as follows:

Oh you great big handsome Marine,
You are the niftiest fellow I've seen,
You are the Nation's pride and joy
Wonderful boy, Wonderful boy
Our hats are off to you,
You are a soldier of the Sea
First to fight for truth and liberty,
If Washington were living too,
He'd be mighty proud of you,
Go over the top!
Go over the top!
You great big handsome Marine

The sheet music can be found at the Library of Congress and Pritzker Military Museum & Library.
