= Jonathan Dixon =

Jonathan Dixon may refer to:

- Jonathan Dixon (actor) (born 1988), British actor, also known as Jonny Dixon
- Jonathan Dixon (judge) (1839–1906), American jurist and politician from New Jersey
- Jonathan N Dixon (born 1972), Australian film director, producer and writer
- Jonny Dixon (born 1984), English footballer
- Jonathan Dixon (politician), Republican member of the Kentucky House of Representatives from 2021 to 2025

== See also ==
- John Dixon (disambiguation)
