= Thomas Dickson =

Thomas Dickson may refer to:

- Thomas Dickson (sprinter) (born 1974), Saint Vincent track and field sprinter
- Thomas Dickson (Upper Canada politician) (c 1775–1825), Upper Canada businessman and political figure
- Thomas Dickson (Nova Scotia politician) (1791–1855), Nova Scotia lawyer and political figure
- Thomas Dickson (industrialist) (1822–1884), industrialist, founder of The Dickson Manufacturing Company, president of the Delaware and Hudson Railway
- Tom Dickson (figure skater), American figure skater
- Tom Dickson (Georgia politician) (born 1945), state representative from Georgia
- Tom Dickson (Australian footballer) (1888–1958), Australian rules footballer
- Tom Dickson, creator of Blendtec and its Will It Blend? advertising campaign
- Tommy Dickson (1929–2007), Northern Irish footballer
- Thomas Law Dickson (ca 1769 – after 1810), farmer, judge and politician in Nova Scotia
- Thomas Dickson (Scottish politician) (1885–1935), Member of Parliament for Lanark, 1923–1924 and 1929–1931
- Thomas Alexander Dickson (1833–1909), Member of Parliament for Dungannon 1874–1880, Tyrone 1881–1885, and Dublin St Stephen's Green 1888–1892
- Thomas Elder Dickson (1899–1978), Scottish artist
- Thomas Dickson (antiquary) (1825–1904) Scottish antiquary and philanthropist
- Thomas Dickson (architect), architect in Worcester about 1864
- Thomas Dickson (Ballyshannon MP) (1741–1817), Irish Member of Parliament for Ballyshannon 1790–98

== See also ==
- Thomas Dixson (1733–1809), soldier and politician in Nova Scotia
- Thomas Dickson Archibald (1813–1890), Canadian businessman and politician
- Thomas Dixon (disambiguation)
