= John Dickerson (disambiguation) =

John Dickerson (born 1968) is an American journalist.

John Dickerson may also refer to:

- John J. Dickerson (1900–1966), Republican politician from New Jersey
- John Dickerson (trainer) (1863–1944), horse trainer
- John S. Dickerson (born 1982), American evangelical Christian pastor and journalist

== See also ==
- John Dickson (disambiguation)
