= John Dickson =

John Dickson may refer to:

== Politicians ==
- John Dickson, Lord Hartree (1600–1653), Scottish judge and MP
- John Dickson (MP), British member of parliament for Peeblesshire
- John Dickson (New York politician) (1783–1852), U.S. representative from New York
- John Dickson (Australian politician), politician in colonial New South Wales
- John Dickson (diplomat) (1847–1906), member of the British Levant Consular Service

== Sportsmen ==
- John Dickson (footballer) (1949–1998), Scottish footballer
- John Dickson (basketball) (born 1945), former ABA basketball player

== Arts and entertainment ==
- John Dickson (American poet) (1916–2009)
- John Dickson (New Zealand poet) (1944–2017)
- John Dickson, film and television composer, see Burn Notice

== Others ==
- John Dickson (minister) 17th-century minister from Rutherglen. Scots Worthy and prisoner on the Bass Rock
- John Dickson (physician) (1795–1847), founder of Asheville Female Seminary
- John Dickson (priest), archdeacon of Down, 1796–1814
- John Dickson (railway contractor) (c. 1819–1892)
- John Dickson (author), Australian Christian author
- John Dickson (civil servant) (1915–1994), Scottish forester and public official
- John B. Dickson (born 1943), American leader in The Church of Jesus Christ of Latter-day Saints
- John Dickson, pseudonym of Sigrid Schultz (1893–1980), American war correspondent
- John F. Dickson (1821–1880), American public servant, law enforcement officer and police captain
- John Frederick Dickson (1835–1891), British colonial administrator in Singapore

== Organisations ==
- John Dickson & Son, Scottish gunmaker

== See also ==
- John Dickson Carr (1906–1977), American author of detective stories
- John Dixon (disambiguation)
- John Dickerson (disambiguation)
