= Stephen Dixon (ceramist) =

British ceramic artist and professor

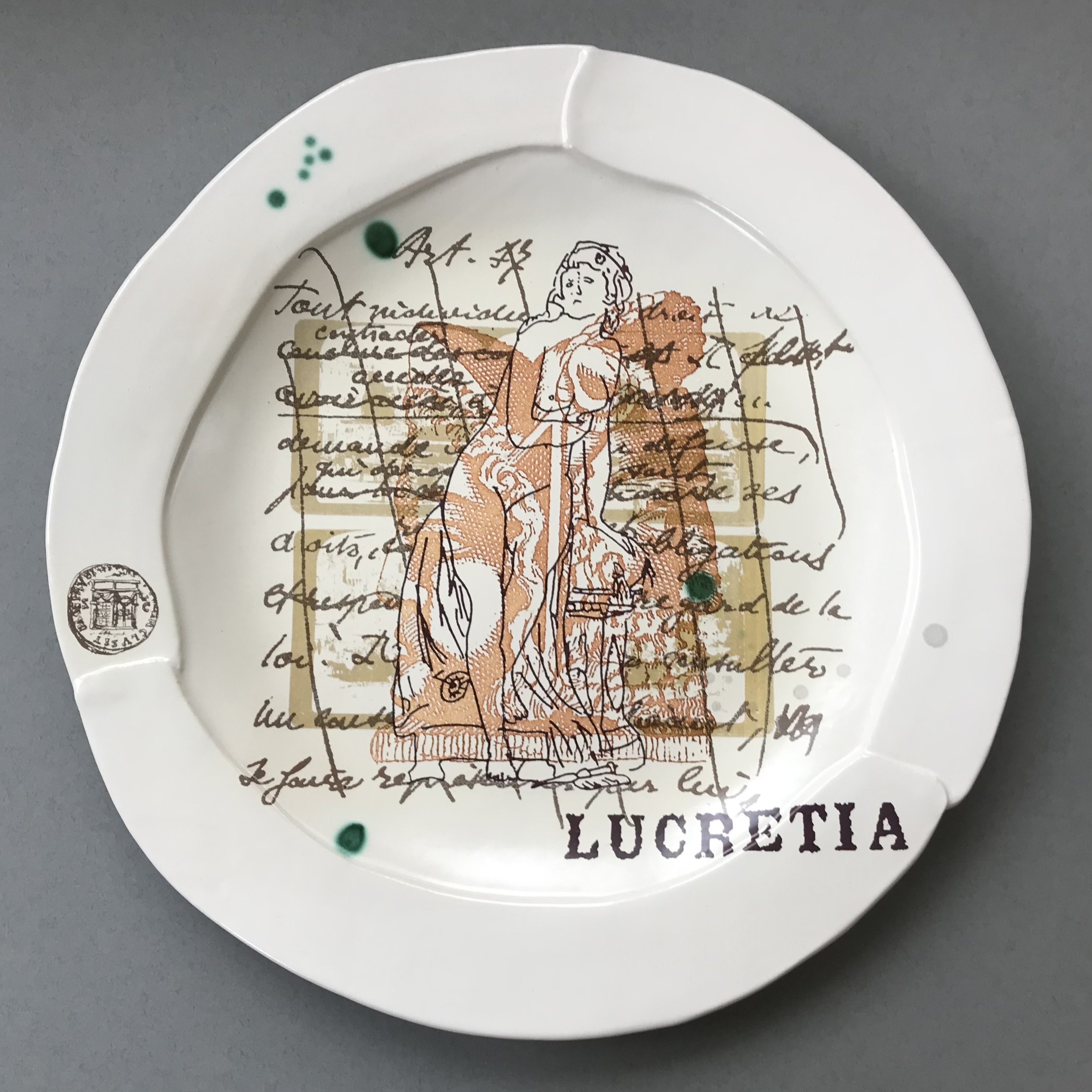
Tin-glazed earthenware plate, with digital ceramic transfers (2024)

Stephen Dixon is a British ceramic artist, satirist, writer, lecturer, and curator. He is professor emeritus at Manchester School of Art. His interests include the British satirical tradition (in both printmaking and ceramics), commemorative wares, and the development of socio-political narratives in contemporary ceramics.

== Early life and education ==
Dixon studied Fine Art at the University of Newcastle-upon-Tyne, and Ceramics at the Royal College of Art, graduating in 1986.

== Career ==
Early exhibitions in London with Contemporary Applied Arts and the Crafts Council established Dixon's reputation for ceramics with a biting political and social satire. His figurative vessels were introduced to the U.S.A. in the early nineties, resulting in solo exhibitions at Pro-Art, St. Louis (1993), Garth Clark Gallery, New York (1995) and Nancy Margolis Gallery, New York (1998). In 1998 Dixon became a Research Fellow at Manchester Metropolitan University.

He is known mainly for his use of dark narrative and for using "illustrated ceramics pots as an unlikely platform for social commentary and political discontent."

Dixon's politically engaged ceramic practice was comprehensively surveyed in a major solo exhibition The Sleep of Reason, a 20-year retrospective showcased at Manchester Art Gallery in 2005 and touring the U.K. from March to October of that year. In 2007 he curated the exhibition 200 Years: Slavery Now for the Bluecoat Display Centre in Liverpool. In 2009 Dixon was awarded the inaugural Victoria & Albert Museum ceramics studio residency, where he embarked on a new body of work exploring political portraiture, Restoration Series (2011–2013).

Dixon's oeuvre combines studio ceramic practice with public engagement and community arts projects. In 2000 he received an Arts Council Year of the Artist award for Asylum, a collaborative project with Amnesty International U.K. and Kosovan refugees. For the public engagement projects Resonance (2015), Resonate (2015) and The Lost Boys (2016), Dixon examined commemoration and the material resonance of archives and objects, in the context of the centenary of the First World War. From Renaissance paintings and British politics to pop culture, Dixon draws on a variety of sources to "challenge the status quo and inspire new ways of thinking."

For the Arts Council-funded project ‘Maiolica and Migration’ (2020–2022) Dixon examined the issue of refugees and asylum seekers, comparing the contemporary journey of migrants across the Mediterranean into Europe with the historic ‘migration’ of white tin-glazed earthenware. Its culmination was ‘Transient: The Ship of Dreams and Nightmares’ (2021), which took the form of a Mediterranean refugee boat, representing refugees’ experiences of the nightmare of conflict and displacement and the dream of refuge. It won the British Ceramics Biennial Award in 2021. Senior curator of ceramics and glass at the Victoria and Albert Museum Alun Graves described the work as "outstanding in concept, design and execution… it stands as a work of exceptional humanity, as well as one of remarkable aesthetic presence".

Dixon is now professor emeritus at Manchester School of Art.

He was a trustee of the Crafts Council from 2009 to 2013 and a member of the Art and Design sub-panel for REF 2014 and REF 2021.

== Artist's statements ==
"I am interested in the history of clay…the unique way that ceramic relics and fragments communicate across the centuries, telling tales of great personalities and events, as well as the mundane rituals of daily life." – Stephen Dixon

"From the start I was never interested in making functional pieces, and more interested in telling stories and making statements." – Stephen Dixon

== Awards ==
- 2021 British Ceramics Biennial Award
- 2021 Arts Council Developing Your Creative Practice Award
- 2014 Member of the Art and Design sub-panel, Higher Education Funding Council for England Research Excellence Framework
- 2009–2013 Trustee of the Crafts Council (United Kingdom)
- 2009 British Ceramics Biennial project award
- 2005 HAT Project/ACE International Research Fellowship
- 2004 Calouste Gulbenkian Foundation, exhibition award
- 2000 Arts Council Year of the Artist (collaborative project with Amnesty International and Kosovan refugees)

== Museum collections ==
Dixon's work is represented in the following museum collections:

- The Everson Museum of Art, Syracuse, New York, USA
- Walker Art Gallery, Liverpool, UK
- National Museum of Ceramics and Decorative Arts, Valencia, Spain
- Potteries Museum and Art Gallery, Stoke-on-Trent, UK
- Brighton Museum and Art Gallery, Royal Pavilion Gardens, Brighton, UK
- Manchester Art Gallery, Manchester, UK
- Museum of Arts & Design, New York, NY, USA
- Racine Art Museum, Racine, WI, USA
- Royal Museum of Scotland, Edinburgh, UK
- San Francisco Museums of Fine Arts, San Francisco, CA, USA
- The British Arts Council and the Crafts Council, UK
- Victoria and Albert Museum, London, UK

== Selected solo exhibitions ==
- 2022 Political Pottery (1996–2020), Messums West, Wiltshire, UK
- 2017 Passchendaele: Mud and Memory, National Memorial Arboretum, Staffordshire, UK
- 2009 Travellers’ Tales, Contemporary Applied Arts, London, UK
- 2008 Embedded Narratives, The Loft, Mumbai, India
- 2005 The Sleep of Reason, Manchester Art Gallery, UK
- 2000 Beauty and the Beast, Anatol Orient, London, UK
- 1998 Nancy Margolis Gallery, New York, USA
- 1995 Garth Clark Gallery, New York, USA

== Selected group exhibitions ==
Dixon has exhibited at museums and galleries of note in the United States, France, Britain, India, and Australia, including the following:

- 2024 Contem’Plate, Messums West, Wiltshire, UK
- 2022 Stephen Dixon & Paul Scott, Bluecoat Display Centre, Liverpool, UK
- 2019 Cultural Icons, Potteries Museum and Art Gallery, Stoke-on-Trent, UK
- 2019 Graphic Pots, Oxford Ceramics Gallery, Oxford, UK
- 2015 The Lost Boys: Remembering the Boy Soldiers of the First World War, Holden Gallery, Manchester, UK
- 2014 Magic Mud: Masterworks in Clay from RAM’s Collection, Racine Art Museum, Racine WI
- 2013 Friendship Forged in Fire: British Ceramics in America, American Museum of Ceramic Art, Pomona, California
- 2013 Top 10 at 10: Favorites from RAM’s Collection, Racine Art Museum, Racine, WI
- 2010 Collect, Saatchi Gallery, London
- 2010 Ahmedabad International Arts Festival, India
- 2009 Allegory Crafts Study Centre, Farnham
- 2007 The HAT Project: Here and There, The British Council, New Delhi
- 2006 Surface Tension, the Jam Factory, Adelaide, Australia
- 2006 Ceramique Contemporaine Biennale Internationale, Vallauris, France
- 2005 Figuring Narratives, Glynn Vivian Art gallery, Swansea
- 2004 Go Figure, Clay Gallery, Venice, California
- 2003 Tea, Anyone?, Racine Art Museum, Racine, Wisconsin
- 2002 Containing Ceramics: Highlights from the Crafts Council Collection, SOFA Chicago
- 2002 16/16, The Scottish Gallery, Edinburgh
- 2000 The Times of Our Lives, Endings, Whitworth Art Gallery, Manchester
