= Kenilworth Fort =

Fort in Hosur, India

Coordinates: 12.733442°N 77.8213996°E

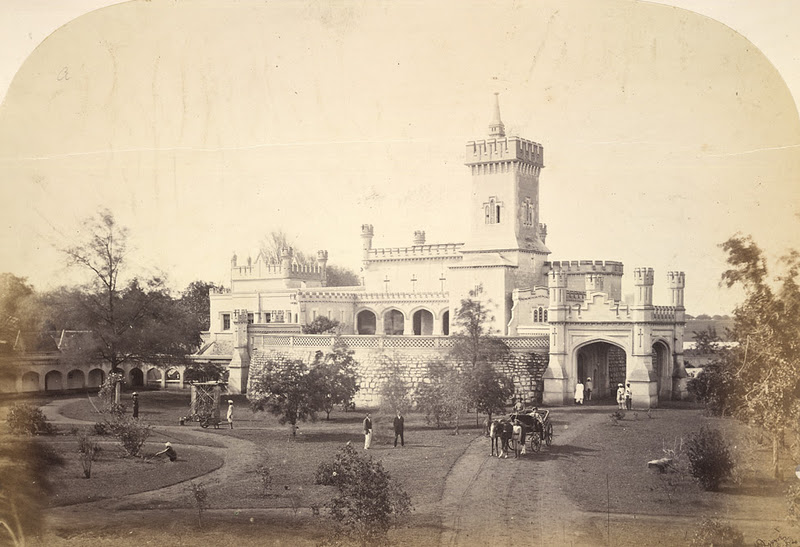
Kenilworth Fort in the early 1860s

Kenilworth Fort or Kenilworth Castle is situated in Hosur in the present day Krishnagiri district in the state of Tamil Nadu in India. Its architecture is based on that of Kenilworth Castle in England, making it probably the only fort in India built to resemble an English castle. Mr. Brett, the collector of Salem between 1859 and 1862, built this at his wife's request to be their residence, hence it is also sometimes called Brett's Fort. It was purchased by the government in 1875.

== History ==
Kenilworth Fort, also known locally as Brett's Castle, was constructed between 1857 and 1861 in Hosur, Tamil Nadu, by William Brett. He is a British Indian Civil Service officer and then Collector of Salem district. The construction was inspired by a personal promise made to his fiancee, who insisted that he build a residence modelled after Kenilworth Castle in Warwickshire, England, before she joined him in India. To realize this ambition, Brett had the architectural plans drawn in England and oversaw construction on the existing ramparts of the Hosur fort. A tehsildar was appointed to supervise the project but eventually gave up keeping financial records due to the scale of expenses. New hamlets were also developed to house chunam (lime) suppliers, masons, and laborers. The castle was completed in 1864, but before Brett and his wife could occupy it, the Salem district headquarters was shifted from Hosur to Salem.

As a result, the couple never resided in the building, and Brett's wife died later in Salem. She was buried at St. John’s Cemetery in Bengaluru. Nicknamed "Brett's Folly" by other British officials, the castle briefly served as the residence and office of the Sub-Collector of Hosur. In 1875, the Sub-Collector's office was moved to a new administrative building, and the castle fell into disuse. Over time, the structure has deteriorated and no visible remains of Kenilworth Fort survive today. The site is now occupied by the Kottai Mariamman Temple in Hosur.

== Architecture ==
Kenilworth Fort was designed in the Gothic Revival style, directly inspired by Kenilworth Castle in Warwickshire, England. Constructed using locally quarried stone and brick bound with chunam (lime) mortar, the building rose to three storeys and featured architectural elements uncommon in southern India. Its outer form included crenellated parapets, steep spires, and square corner towers that gave the structure a medieval European appearance. The central entrance was marked by a porte-cochère, with arched doorways that opened onto colonnaded verandas.

On the lower levels, narrow slit-like windows reinforced its fortress-like character, while the upper floors featured larger mullioned windows and dormered openings, blending defense-inspired design with colonial-era residential comforts. Internally, the structure was said to include carved wooden doors, marble flooring, and imported wrought-iron balustrades. Though most of these features have not survived, photographs of the original interiors and exterior facades are reportedly preserved at the Sub-Collector's office in Hosur.

== Gallery ==
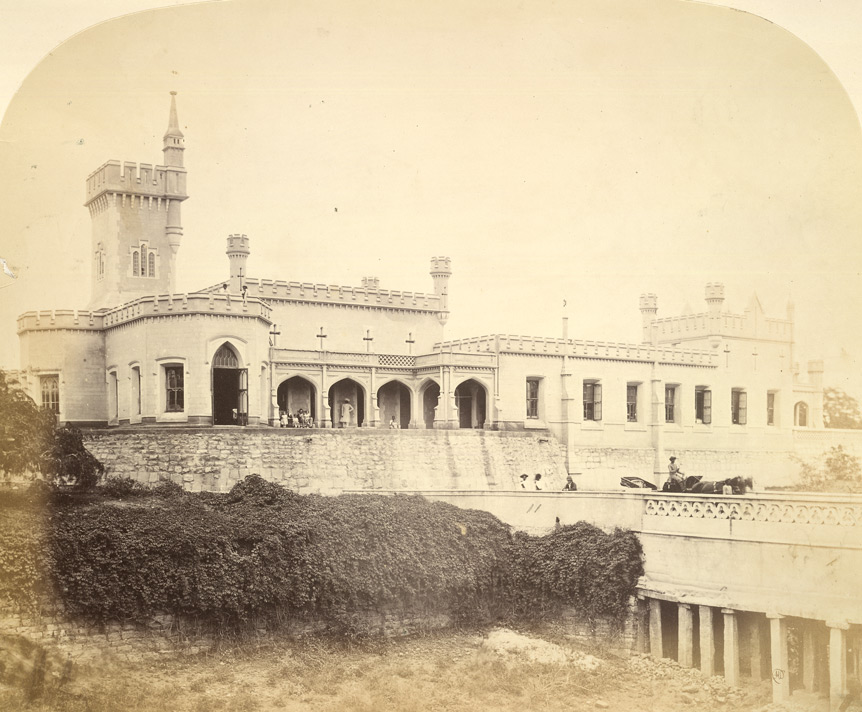

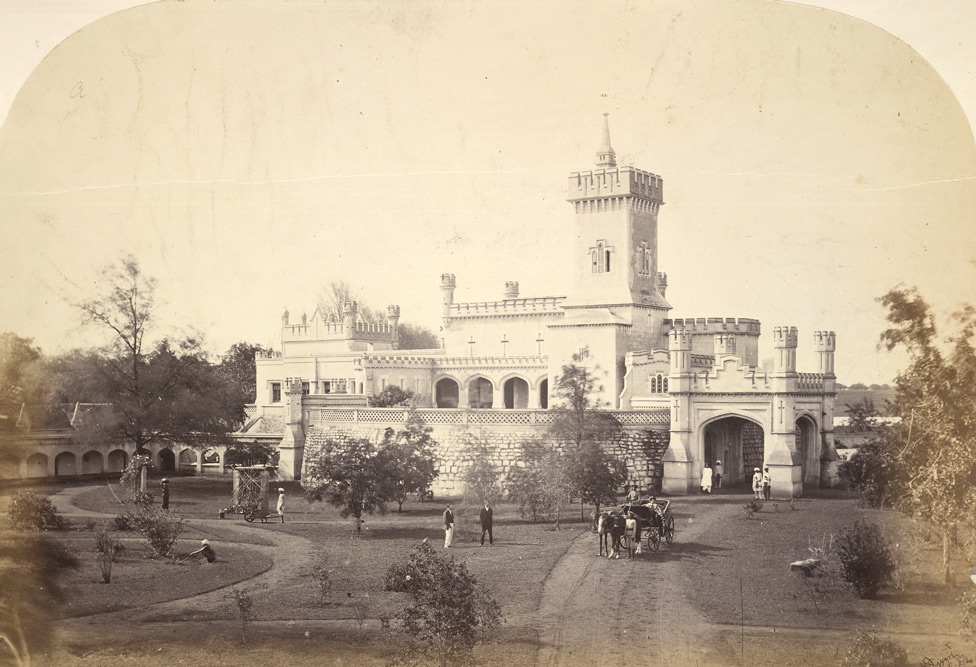

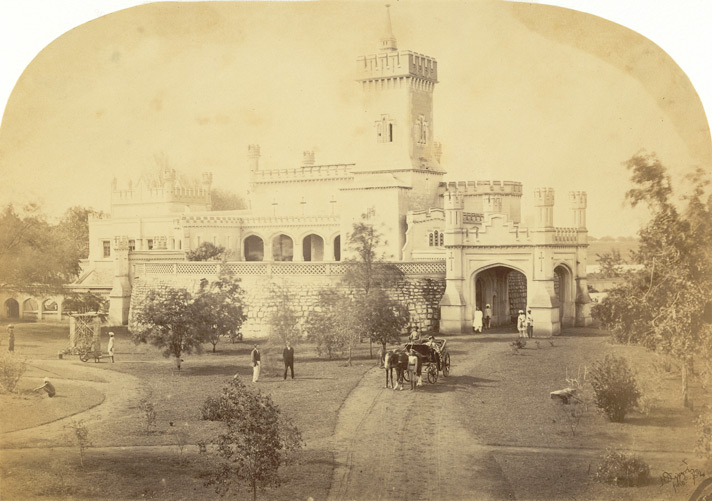
