= Ben Dixon =

Ben Dixon may refer to:

- Ben Dixon (Australian footballer) (born 1977), Australian rules player
- Ben Dixon (English footballer) (born 1974), English football (soccer) player
- Ben Dixon (fictional character), in the Robotech Universe
- Ben Dixon (musician) (1934–2018), American jazz drummer
