= Kyle Dixon =

Kyle Dixon may refer to:

- Kyle Dixon (lacrosse) (born 1984), American lacrosse player
- Kyle Dixon (footballer) (born 1994), English footballer
- Kyle Dixon (American football) (born 2000), American football player
- Kyle Dixon (musician), American musician
