= William U. Parfet =

American businessman and philanthropist

William U. (Bill) Parfet, is an American businessman and philanthropist. He is a native of Kalamazoo, Michigan.

== Early life and education ==
The eldest of four children to Martha G. Parfet (née Gilmore) and Ray Theodore Parfet, Parfet attended Lawrenceville High School in New Jersey. He received a B.A. (with honors) in Economics from Lake Forest College in 1970, and an M.B.A. in International Finance from the Ross School of Business at University of Michigan in 1972.

== Corporate career ==
Parfet has previously held numerous public company positions, including chairman, president and independent lead director of numerous boards. He served as vice chairman of the board of The Upjohn Company where he was also president (1991–1993) and executive vice president (1989–1991). Parfet joined The Upjohn Company (now recognized as Pfizer) in March 1973 and was a member of the Board of Directors from 1985 through 2003. He also served as the chairman of the board and independent lead director for Stryker Corporation, director for Monsanto Company, director for Consumers Energy, director of Bissel Inc and director for Taubman Company. More recently he served as the executive chairman of inviCRO LLC, which was sold to Konica Minolta in 2017.

Parfet currently serves as the chairman and CEO of Northwood Group, which includes the investment arm of his family office.

In November 2018, Parfet acquired a 16.8% shareholding in Australian listed company, Purifloh Limited (PO3:ASX; PUFLF:OTCQX). Purifloh has the license for technologies for air purification, water purification and the sterilization of medical equipment and facilities through its association with Michigan-based advanced scientific R&D operation, Somnio Global. He served as a director of Purifloh upon making this investment though transitioned to chairman of the board following the AGM on 22 November 2019.

== Personal life ==
Parfet is married to Barbara and has six children.

== Philanthropy ==
In 2011, Parfet donated the 330,000 square-foot building that has been home to the WMed Upjohn Campus medical school since its inaugural class in 2014.

Parfet plays an ongoing and active role in a wide range of philanthropic focused on the sustainable development of Western Michigan and also sits as President of the Board of Trustees of the globally renowned Gilmore Car Museum out of Kalamazoo, Michigan.

Parfet is also involved with the Bay Harbor Foundation, an organization that has provided millions of dollars in grant awards to nonprofit organizations working to improve the quality of life in the Little Traverse Bay Region. It has also provided hundreds of scholarships through the Bay Harbor Foundation Scholar Program.

In 2013, Parfet was inducted into Financial Executives International Hall of Fame.
