= Travis Dixon =

American media studies scholar

Travis L. Dixon
- Education: University of California, Los Angeles (B.A., 1992); University of California, Santa Barbara (M.A., 1994; Ph.D., 1998)
- Known for: Work on racial bias in criminal news in the United States
- Awards: National Communication Association top article award . & First Black Inductee, International Communication Association Fellows
- Scientific career
- Fields: Communication studies
- Institutions: University of Illinois at Urbana-Champaign
- Thesis: Overrepresentation and underrepresentation of African Americans and Latinos as lawbreakers on television news (1998)

Travis Lemar Dixon is an American media studies scholar and Professor of Communication at the University of Illinois at Urbana-Champaign. He is known for researching racial and religious stereotyping in television news in the United States, as well as audiences' reception of rap music. In 2025, Dixon received an endowed position, named to the "David L Swanson Professor of Communications" position at the University of Illinois.
