= Lorna Dixon =

Australian Aboriginal custodian (d. 1976)

Lorna Rose Dixon (also known as Laura Mandima Dixon; née Ebsworth; c. 1917–21 December 1976) was an Australian Aboriginal custodian and preserver of the Wangkumara language.

== Early life ==
Dixon was born at Tibooburra, New South Wales, probably in 1917, to Albert Ebsworth, a stockman of the Galali language group, and his wife Rosie, née Jones. She and her siblings attended the Tibooburra public school, and spent much of their free time with their Wangkumara-speaking maternal grandparents in the bush around the town, learning about bush tucker, significant sites and traditional stories. Dixon's parents also took them to ceremonial gatherings, including a major initiation held at Innamincka in the early 1920s, and regularly took them travelling through their traditional country, following the tracks of ancestral beings during the Dreaming.

== Forced move to Brewarrina ==
In 1938, the Aboriginal Protection Board moved Aboriginal people living at Tibooburra to a ration station near Brewarrina, over two hundred miles away, forcing them to comply by threatening them with guns and with having their children removed. Dixon and her extended family had to leave their homes with just a few hours' notice, taking only a few belongings, and were loaded into trucks for the trip. At Brewarrina, accommodation which had been barely adequate for the one hundred people previously living there now had to cater for over five hundred people. The women were told to sleep on the schoolhouse floor, and the men on the verandah. The manager was armed and intimidating, and the Wangkumara people felt isolated among the other cultural groups living there. Within a short time, Dixon's grandmother and step-great-grandfather died. Dixon's sister had been pregnant when they were all removed from Tibooburra, and died soon after giving birth in Brewarrina Hospital. The manager did not permit any of Dixon's family to leave the station for work or outings in Brewarrina, and forbade them to use their traditional language.

== Move to Bourke ==
After about three or four years, a new station manager arrived, who allowed Dixon and her family to leave. They moved to Bourke, where Lorna met and married Eric Dixon, a stationhand, from Walgett. They had twelve or seventeen children together. Lorna Dixon's parents died not long after moving to Bourke. After the years of being prohibited from speaking her language, Dixon did not teach it to her children. However, when alone, and especially before going to sleep at night, she had translated her thoughts into Wangkumara. She also devised a way of spelling the language, which she shared with a cousin living at Broken Hill, and they used it to write letters to each other, as they felt they could express their feelings better in Wangkumara than in English.

== Language and cultural documentation ==
In 1970, Australian Institute of Aboriginal Studies researcher Janet Mathews, who was recording Aboriginal music, languages and stories of the past in country areas of New South Wales, heard of Lorna Dixon. Dixon was keen to document her knowledge of the Wangkumara language and traditional customs, stories and significant sites. She recorded more than sixty tapes of one and a half hours each with Mathews. She also identified many sacred and significant sites in the "Corner Country" around Tibooburra, Naryilco and Cooper's Creek, with Mathews and with a NSW National Parks and Wildlife Service Aboriginal Sites Survey Officer, Howard Creamer.
In 1974, Dixon was elected a member of the Australian Institute of Aboriginal Studies. In 2004, a room at the institute was named the Laura Mandima Dixon Room in her honour.
In 1994, nine of Dixon's traditional stories were published in an anthology titled The Opal that Turned into Fire and Other Stories from the Wangkumara (Magabala Books, ISBN 1875641130).

== Death ==
Dixon died at Bourke on 21 December 1976, of a cerebral haemorrhage.
