= Harold Dixon (songwriter) =

American songwriter

Harold Dixon was an American composer, lyricist and publisher.

== Published compositions ==
- "Davy of the Navy, You're a Wonderful Boy" (1918)
- "Oh Henry! Mammy Surely Paddled Me" (1918)
- "There'll Be a Hot-Time (When the Boys Are Mustered Out)" (1918) (lyrics by Captain Leland-Yerdon)
- "You Great Big Handsome Marine" (1918)
- "We're Going to Get to Berlin Through the Air" (c. 1918)
- "Dixie Lullaby" (1919) (lyrics by David Portoy)
- "I'm Going to Start All Over" (1919) (lyrics by Edwin F. Klein and Jacob Lewis Klein)
- "Louisiana Waltz" (1919) (lyrics by Robert E. Hary)
- "Pretty" (1919)
- "Way Down in Birmingham" (1919) (lyrics by Edwin F. Klein and Jacob Lewis Klein)
- "Call Me Back, Pal O' Mine" (1921) (lyrics by Lawrence Perricone)
- "Mammy Land" (1921) (lyrics by Nomis)
- "Wishing for You" (1921) (lyrics by Mary McMillan)
- "I'll Take You Home Again Pal of Mine" (1922) (music by Claude Sacre)
- "Italian Moon" (1922) (lyrics Bob Causer)
- "Little Pal of Long Ago" (1922) (lyrics by Walter Hirsch and Claude Sacre)
- "Rock Me to Sleep in My Rocky Mountain Home" (1922) (lyrics by Robert E. Harty)
- "Oh, For a Pal Like You" (1924)
- "Till the End o' the World with You" (1925)
- "I'm a Bad Boy Looking for a Good Girl" (1926) (co-written with Sam H. Stept)
- "Gunga Din" (1927) (Lyrics by Rudyard Kipling from The Barrack Room Ballads)
- "Snuffins" (1927)
- "Stay Out of the South" (1927)
- The Scarecrows' Convention (1927) (piano solo)
