= Daniel Dixon =

Daniel Dixon or Danny Dixon may refer to:

- Sir Daniel Dixon, 1st Baronet (1844–1907), Lord Mayor of Belfast
- Daniel Dixon, 2nd Baron Glentoran (1912–1995), soldier and politician
- Daniel Dixon (basketball) (born 1994), American basketball player
- Daniel Dixon (triathlete) (born 2002), English triathlete
- Danny Dixon, a character in Pumpkinhead II: Blood Wings
- Danny Dixon, a character in The Runaway
