= Cyril Dixon =

English footballer

Personal information
- Full name: Cyril Dixon
- Date of birth: 1 February 1901
- Place of birth: Rawmarsh, England
- Date of death: 1978 (aged 76–77)
- Position: Full-back

Senior career*
Years	Team	Apps	(Gls)
1923–1924	Rawmarsh Athletic		
1924–1932	Barnsley	251	(7)
1932–1933	Reading	4	(0)
1933	Scarborough		
Total		255	(7)
- * Club domestic league appearances and goals

Cyril Dixon (1 February 1901 – 1978) was an English footballer who played in the Football League for Barnsley and Reading.
