= Don Dixon =

Don Dixon may refer to:

- Don Dixon (artist) (born 1951), space artist, painter and illustrator
- Don Dixon (musician) (born 1950), record producer, songwriter, musician, bassist
- Don Dixon (footballer) (born 1937), former Australian rules footballer
- Don Dixon, Baron Dixon (1929–2017), Labour MP for Jarrow 1979–1997

== See also ==
- Donald Dickson Farmer (1877–1956), Scottish recipient of the VC
