= Thomas Dixon =

Thomas Dixon may refer to:

- Thomas Dixon (nonconformist) (died 1754), English minister and tutor
- Thomas Dixon (architect) (died 1886), Baltimore architect
- Thomas C. Dixon (died 1870s), hatter and political figure in Canada West
- Thomas Hill Dixon (1816–1880), superintendent of convicts in Western Australia
- Thomas Dixon (autodidact) (1831–1880), working class literary correspondent of Sunderland.
- Thomas Dixon (South African cricketer) (1847–1915)
- Thomas Dixon Jr. (1864–1946), American lecturer who wrote the novel made into Birth of a Nation
- Sir Thomas Dixon, 2nd Baronet (1868–1950), Northern Ireland politician
- Thomas Dixon (Irish cricketer) (1906–1985)
- Thomas Sidney Dixon (1916–1993), involved in the Max Stuart case, a trial for murder in Australia
- Thomas Dixon, 1st Baron of Symondstone (1247–1307)

== See also ==
- Thomas Dixon Centre, built 1908, performing arts venue in Australia
- Thomas Dickson (disambiguation)
- Tom Dixon (disambiguation)
- Thomas Homer-Dixon (born 1956), Canadian political scientist
