= Cecil Dixon =

Cecil Dixon may refer to:

- Cec Dixon (1891–1969), South African cricketer
- Cecil Dixon (cricketer) (1903–1973), Scottish cricketer
- Cecil Dixon (footballer) (1935–2024), English former footballer
