= Tudor Dixon =

American politician and commentator (born 1977)

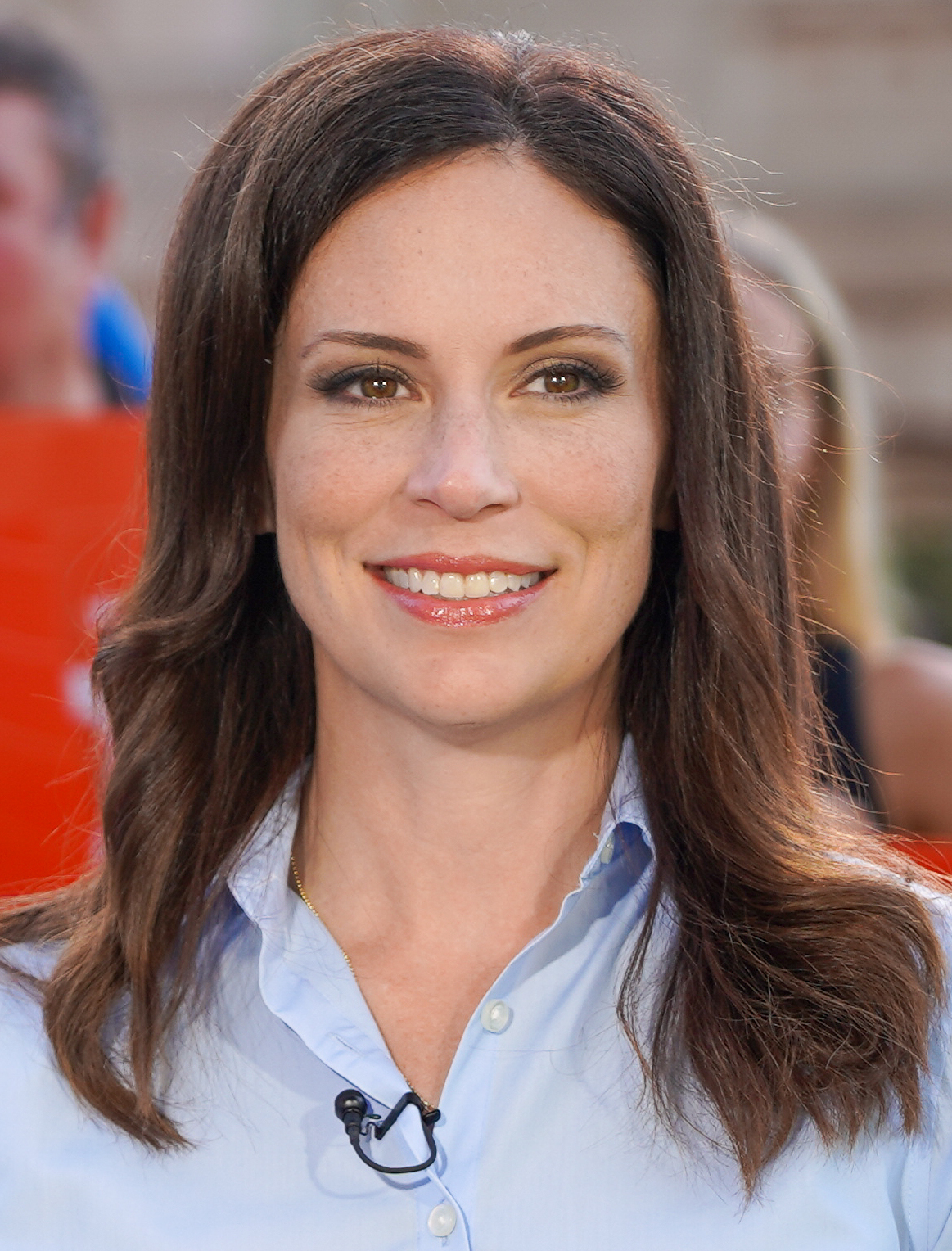
- Dixon in 2022

Personal details
- Born: Tudor Makary; May 5, 1977 (age 49)
- Party: Republican
- Spouse: Aaron Dixon
- Children: 4
- Education: University of Kentucky (BA)
- Website: Official website

Tudor Dixon (née Makary; born May 5, 1977) is an American politician, businesswoman, and conservative political commentator. A member of the Republican Party, Dixon was the party's nominee for governor of Michigan in 2022. She was the party's first female nominee for governor in the state. Dixon lost the election to incumbent Democratic Governor Gretchen Whitmer.

== Early life and education ==
Dixon grew up in Naperville, Illinois, the daughter of Vaughn Makary (died 2022) and Catherine Makary, graduating from Naperville Central High School in 1995. She is of partial Lebanese descent.

Dixon received a Bachelor of Arts with a major in psychology from the University of Kentucky in 1998. In the 2000s, she moved to Muskegon in western Michigan.

== Career ==
Before her career in media, Dixon was an executive at Michigan Steel Inc, her father's steel foundry. In 2017, Dixon co-founded Lumen Student News, a now-defunct news site that produced conservative-leaning lessons for grade school students.

=== Conservative commentator ===
In 2018, she became a conservative commentator, anchoring the weekly program America's Voice Live on Real America's Voice, a streaming news and opinion channel.

In March 2023, Premiere Networks launched The Clay Travis & Buck Sexton Podcast Network, with Dixon becoming their debut host. She hosts "The Tudor Dixon Podcast".

== 2022 Michigan gubernatorial candidacy ==
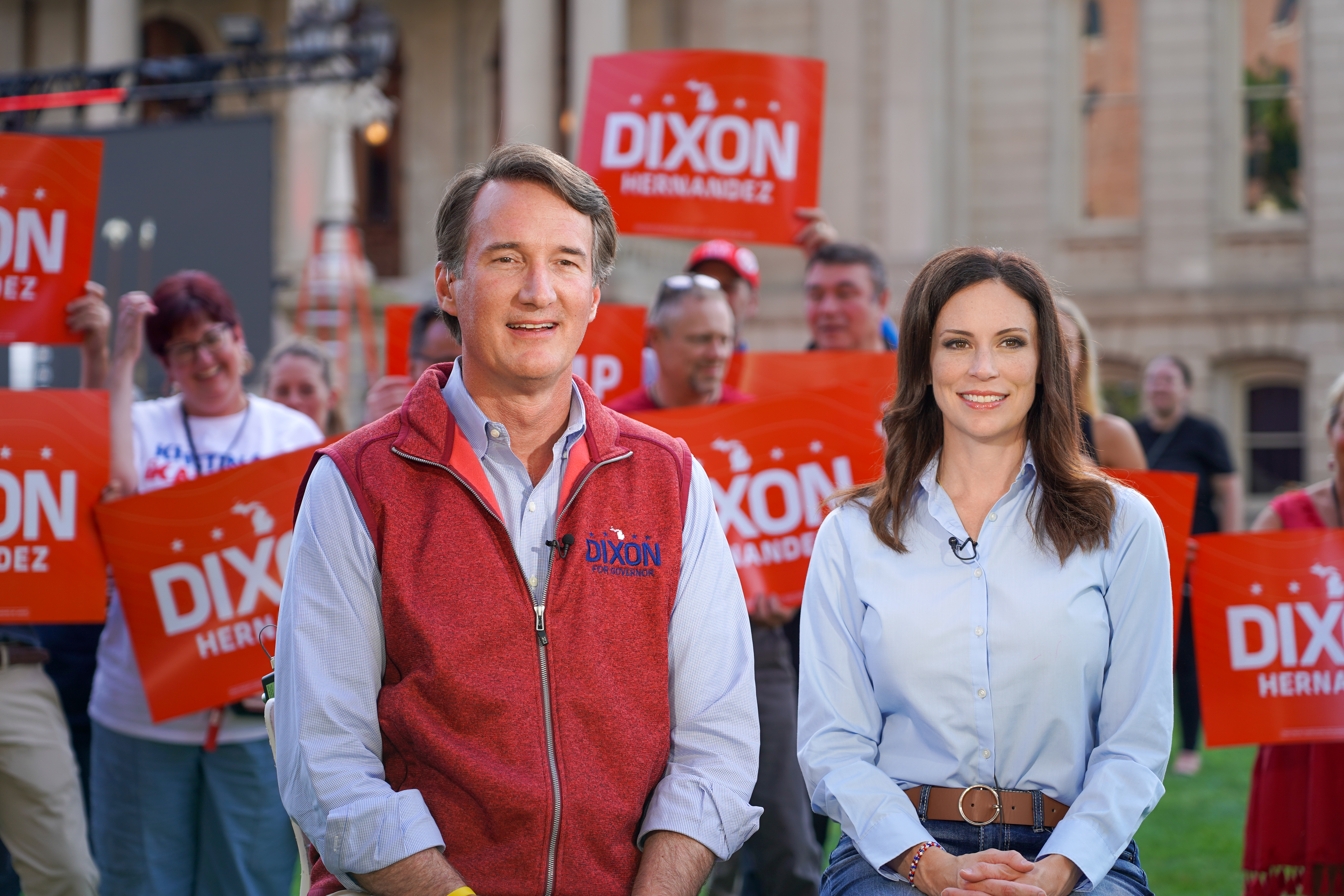
Dixon campaigning with Virginia Governor Glenn Youngkin

In May 2021, Dixon announced her candidacy to become the Republican Party's nominee for Governor of Michigan in the 2022 election, seeking to challenge incumbent Democrat Gretchen Whitmer. In a July 2022 Republican primary debate, Dixon pledged loyalty to Trump. During the campaign, Dixon promoted Donald Trump's attempts to overturn the election. In a May 2022 debate, when asked, "Do you believe Donald Trump legitimately won the 2020 election in Michigan?," Dixon responded, "Yes." In subsequent media appearances, Dixon would not say whether she still held that belief.

Trump endorsed Dixon after Trump's former Secretary of Education Betsy DeVos wrote a letter to the former president, asking him to support Dixon, whom DeVos termed "the only one who can stand toe to toe with" Whitmer. In August 2022, Dixon won the Republican primary.

Dixon was endorsed by Trump, the DeVos family, former acting director of national intelligence Richard Grenell, Congressman Bill Huizenga, GOP House Conference Chair Elise Stefanik, and former Democratic Congresswoman Tulsi Gabbard.

Dixon lost the general election. On November 9, she called Whitmer to concede the race.

== Political positions ==
=== Abortion ===
Dixon supports a ban on all abortions except when necessary to save the life of the pregnant woman and would oppose any exceptions for rape or incest. She has also said she does not believe the mother's health is a sufficient reason, saying that the "health of the mother and life of the mother are different." In an interview, she described the example of a 14-year-girl raped by her uncle as a "perfect example" of an abortion that she believes should be prohibited, adding, "a life is a life for me." In follow-up interviews, she has repeated her belief that there should be no exceptions for victims of rape and incest. Following her gubernatorial campaign, Dixon hosted President Donald Trump on her podcast where she said Trump encouraged her to talk about abortion differently. "You came to me and you said, 'You got to talk differently about abortion.' And we could not pivot, we could not pivot in time," Dixon said.

In a Fox News interview, Dixon praised former United Nations Ambassador Nikki Haley for her answer on abortion during a GOP primary debate, where Haley argued Republicans should find "consensus" by focusing on banning late-term abortions, encouraging adoptions and fostering policies that protect doctors and nurses who don't want to perform abortions. "It was the perfect response," Dixon said.

=== COVID-19 ===
In a June 2020 episode of her America's Voice Live show, Dixon said "our kids are not at risk" of catching COVID-19. When Whitmer brought this up during an October 2022 debate, Dixon denied making the comment and said "My own children have had COVID, so I would never say that."

Following an October 2022 decision to include COVID-19 vaccines on the CDC's optional immunization recommendation schedule, Dixon alleged that "liberal policymakers are pushing COVID-19 vaccines on our children and forcing parents out of the process". According to Michigan Advance, the state "does not have a vaccine mandate for COVID-19 and unvaccinated children are not precluded from attending school"; the media outlet further noted that "This is not the first time Dixon has touted misinformation about COVID-19 and children".

In a June 2020 episode of her show, Dixon invoked a conspiracy theory that the COVID-19 pandemic was part of a plot that Democrats have planned for decades in order to topple the United States.

=== Education ===
Dixon plans to found Education Savings Accounts, which can hold funding for students to use on various options of schools. In order to establish Education Savings Accounts, she has called for the repeal of the state's constitutional provision prohibiting public funding of private schools.

Dixon proposed a piece of legislation that would ban teachers from talking about sexual orientation or gender identity with K-3 students. She called for the resignation of the leader of Michigan's Department of Education due to LGBT training materials, stating that "our schools are laboratories for their social experiments and our children are their lab rats."

In June 2022, Dixon spoke in support of a bill that would prohibit drag shows in public schools and permit parents and guardians to sue schools that host drag shows. Critics highlighted the lack of evidence for such events in Michigan schools, and they pointed out that drag shows were not defined in the bill.

=== Equal rights ===
Dixon has made public comments that have been condemned as racist, such as defending the usage of blackface. She has also described hijabs as "oppressive garments". She stated that Planned Parenthood aims to control the black population and that the George Floyd protests were part of a scheme by Democrats to take down Donald Trump. During her campaign for governor, Dixon made a gender-based attack, suggesting her opponent, Gretchen Whitmer, was not a "real woman".

=== Fiscal policy ===
Dixon supports tax cuts, especially by ending the state's flat income tax of 4.25%, which makes up one-sixth of the state's total budget. Her plan to replace revenue lost by the tax cut relies on tourists from other states. Dixon has vowed not to cut police funding. Dixon has criticized Gretchen Whitmer for her order to shut down the Line 5 pipeline, arguing that the closing will only lead to an increase in energy prices. She has also criticized Whitmer's policies regarding nursing homes during the COVID-19 pandemic. Dixon, whose grandmother died at a nursing home amid the pandemic, accused Whitmer of being "ruled by fear".

=== Voting policies ===
Dixon supports the Michigan Voter ID Initiative. If passed, the initiative would require governmental ID to vote, end the sending of unsolicited applications for absentee ballots, abolish ballot drop boxes, prohibit ballot harvesting, restrict election expenses to be publicly funded, and toughen punishments for election fraud. Dixon also called for an audit of the 2020 election results in Michigan.

== Personal life ==
Dixon is married to Aaron William Dixon, a financial controller, and they have four daughters. She is a breast cancer survivor, having been diagnosed in 2015. Dixon is an evangelical Christian. Dixon considers acting a hobby and has appeared in low-budget horror films. Dixon is part of the President's Fellows Program at Cornerstone University in Michigan, where she serves as a student mentor and participates in speaking engagements.

Party political offices
Preceded by Bill Schuette	Republican nominee for Governor of Michigan; 2022	Succeeded by John James
