= Tom Dixon =

Tom or Tommy Dixon may refer to:

- Tom Dixon (American football) (born 1961), American football player
- Tom Dixon (catcher) (1906–1982), Negro league baseball catcher
- Tom Dixon (pitcher) (born 1955), Major League Baseball pitcher
- Tom Dixon (Canadian football) (born 1960), kicker in the Canadian Football League
- Tom Dixon (hurler) (1930–2003), Irish hurler
- Tom Dixon (industrial designer) (born 1959), British designer
- Tommy Dixon (footballer, born 1929) (1929–2014), English footballer
- Tommy Dixon (footballer, born 1882) (1882–1941), English footballer
- Tommy Dixon (footballer, born 1899) (1899–?), English footballer

== See also ==
- Thomas Dixon (disambiguation)
