= John Dixon (Australian rules footballer) =

Australian rules footballer (1887–1947)

Personal information
- Full name: John Edward Dixon
- Born: 31 March 1887; Shepparton, Victoria
- Died: 26 May 1947 (aged 60); South Melbourne, Victoria

Playing career^{1}
Years	Club	Games (Goals)
1906	Essendon	1 (0)
- ^{1} Playing statistics correct to the end of 1906.

John Edward Dixon (31 March 1887 – 26 May 1947) was an Australian rules footballer who played with Essendon in the Victorian Football League (VFL).
