= Monica Dixon =

Monica Dixon is the executive director of Forward Together PAC, the political action committee of former Virginia Governor Mark Warner.

She was the Deputy Chief of Staff to former Vice President Al Gore, and was one of his top political aides during the 2000 Presidential Election. During the election she was tasked with running the Nashville war room of the Gore-Lieberman campaign.

Dixon is also the former Chief of Staff to the House Democratic Caucus and the Director of Field Communications for the America Coming Together committee.

Preceded by David Strauss	Deputy Chief of Staff to the Vice President of the United States; 1997–2000	Succeeded by Nancy McFadden
