= Larry Dixon =

Larry or Lawrence Dixon may refer to:

- Larry Dixon (fantasy artist) (born 1966), fantasy artist and novelist
- Larry Dixon (dragster driver) (born 1966), professional drag racer in the NHRA
- Larry Dixon (politician) (1942–2020), American politician; Republican member of the Alabama Senate
- Lawrence Dixon (musician) (1894–1970), American jazz musician
- Lawrence Murray Dixon (1901–1949), architect in Miami Beach, Florida

== See also ==
- Larry Dickson (born 1938), former racing driver
- Lawrence Dixon, character in Silencing Mary
