= Matthew Dixon (British Army officer) =

Major-General Matthew Dixon VC CB
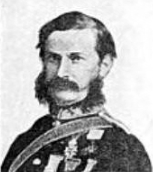
- Born: 5 February 1821; Avranches, Basse-Normandie, France
- Died: 8 January 1905 (aged 83); Pembury, Kent, England
- Burial place: Kensal Green Cemetery, London
- Military career
- Allegiance: United Kingdom
- Branch: British Army
- Rank: Major-General
- Units: Royal Artillery
- Conflicts: Crimean War
- Awards: Victoria Cross; Order of the Bath; Légion d'honneur

Major-General Matthew Charles Dixon VC CB (5 February 1821 – 8 January 1905) was a British Army officer and a recipient of the Victoria Cross, the highest and most prestigious award for gallantry in the face of the enemy that can be awarded to British and Commonwealth forces, and a Knight of the Legion of Honour.

He was the eldest son of Major-General Matthew Charles Dixon RE (1791–1860) and his second wife Emma Dalton (1794–1853) and was born in France on 5 February 1821.

== Military career ==
He entered the British Army in 1839, was promoted to lieutenant in 1841, and to captain in 1848.

He was 34 years old, and a captain in the Royal Regiment of Artillery, British Army during the Crimean War when the following deed took place for which he was awarded the VC.

On 17 April 1855 at Sebastopol, the Crimea, at about 2pm the battery commanded by Captain Dixon was blown up by a shell from the enemy which burst in the magazine, destroying the parapets, killing or wounding 10 men, disabling five guns and covering a sixth with earth. The captain reopened fire with the remaining gun and continued firing it until sunset, despite the heavy concentration of fire from the enemy's batteries and the ruined state of his own.

As well as the VC, he received the 5th class of the Medjidie and the Turkish Medal and was made a Knight of the Légion d'honneur.

He was promoted to major and lieutenant-colonel in 1855, colonel in 1862 and retired from the Royal Artillery in 1869 with the honorary rank of major-general. He later achieved the rank of major general.

== Later life ==
On 13 May 1862 he married Henrietta Letitia Eliza Bosanquet (1834–1926), daughter of Admiral C.J. Bosanquet of Wildwood. They had no family, and his medal was in the possession of a descendant of his sister, Frances Maria Clarke née Dixon. It was sold to the Lord Ashcroft collection in 2014.

On leaving the army he took up residence at "Woodgate", Pembury (near Tonbridge) and lived there until his death on 7 January 1905 aged 84. He was buried at Kensal Green Cemetery on 12 January. His wife survived him by 21 years.
