= Henry Horatio Dixon =

Irish biologist (1869-1953)

- Portrait by Walter Stoneman, 1922
- Born: 19 May 1869; Dublin, Ireland
- Died: 20 December 1953 (aged 84); Dublin, Ireland
- Known for: cohesion-tension theory
- Awards: Fellow of the Royal Society
- Scientific career
- Workplaces: Trinity College, Dublin

Henry Horatio Dixon FRS (19 May 1869, Dublin – 20 December 1953, Dublin) was a plant biologist and professor at Trinity College Dublin. Along with John Joly, he put forward the cohesion-tension theory of water and mineral movement in plants.

== Life ==
He was born in Dublin, the youngest of the seven sons of George Dixon, a soap manufacturer and Rebecca (née Yeates) Dixon. He was educated at Rathmines School and Trinity College, Dublin. His mother's family, the Yeates, were makers of scientific instruments based in Rathmines. After studying in Bonn, Germany he in 1894 he was appointed assistant and later full Professor of Botany at Trinity. In 1906 he became Director of the Botanic gardens and in 1910 of the Herbarium also. He had a close working relationship with physicist John Joly and together they developed the cohesion theory of the ascent of sap.

In 1907 he married Dorothea Mary, daughter of Sir John H Franks, with whom he raised three sons. He was the father of Hal Dixon and grandfather of Adrian Dixon, Joly Dixon and Ruth Dixon. They lived at 30 Holles Street, 4 and 17 Earlsfort Terrace, 23 Northbrook Road, and in 3 houses on Temple Road, Dartry. Their final home was that left to Dixon by Joly, known as "Somerset".

In 1908 he was elected a Fellow of the Royal Society, his application citation describing him as

[Assistant to the] Professor of Botany in the University of Dublin. Has published various papers on Vegetable Histology, Cytology and Physiology. Joint author with J Joly, of papers, 'On the Ascent of Sap' (Phil Trans, vol 186, B, 1895); 'The Path of the Transpiration-Current' (Annals of Botany, vol ix, 1895); author also of the following papers: - 'Fertilization of 'Pinus silvestris' (ibid, vol viii, 1894); 'On the Vegetative Organs of 'Vanda teres' (Proc Roy Irish Acad, 3rd Ser, vol iii, 1894); 'On the Chromosomes of 'Lilium longiflorum' and 'On the Nuclei of the Endosperm of 'Fritillaria imperials' (ibid, 1896); 'On the Osmotic Pressure in the Cells of Leaves' (ibid, vol iv, 1897); 'On the Physics of the Transpiration-Current' (Notes from the Botanical School, Trinity College, Dublin, 1897); 'Transpiration into a Saturated Atmosphere' (Proc Roy Irish Acad, 3rd Ser, vol iv, 1898); 'On the First Mitosis of the Spore-mother-Cells of Lilium' (ibid, vol vi, 1899); 'The Possible Function of the Nucleolus in Heredity' (Annals of Botany, vol xiii, 1899); 'On the Structure of Coccospheres and the Origin of Coccoliths' (Proc Roy Soc, vol lxvi, 1900); 'On the Germination of Seeds after Exposure to High Temperature' (notes from Botanical School, Trinity College, Dublin, 1902); 'Cohesion Theory of the Ascent of Sap' (Proc Roy Dublin Soc, vol x, 1903); 'Observations on the Temperature of Subterranean Organs of Plants' (Trans Roy Irish Acad, vol xxxii, B, 1903), and other papers on histological and physiology subjects.

He delivered the society's Croonian Lecture in 1937.

In 1916 he was awarded the Boyle Medal of the Royal Dublin Society In 1949 he was elected an honorary fellow of Trinity College Dublin.
