= Johnny Dixon =

Johnny Dixon may refer to:

- Johnny Dixon (American football) (born 2001), American football player
- Johnny Dixon (footballer) (1923–2009), English footballer

== See also ==
- Johnny Dixon (series), an American television series
- Jonny Dixon (born 1984), English footballer and film producer
