= Hal Dixon (biochemist) =

Irish biochemist

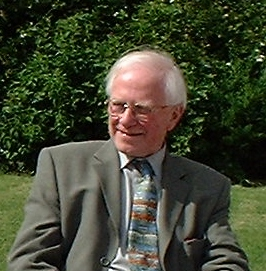
- Hal Dixon
- Born: Henry Berkeley Franks Dixon; 16 May 1928; Dublin
- Died: 30 July 2008 (aged 80); Cambridge, England
- Education: Shrewsbury School, University of Cambridge (D.Sc.)
- Known for: pH-dependence of enzyme-catalysed reaction
- Spouse: Heather Spittle (m. 1957)
- Children: 3
- Father: Henry Horatio Dixon
- Scientific career
- Fields: Biochemistry, enzymology, arsenic biochemistry
- Workplaces: University of Cambridge; Engelhardt Institute of Molecular Biology, Moscow
- Doctoral advisor: Frank Young

Henry Berkeley Franks Dixon (16 May 1928 – 30 July 2008) was an Irish biochemist, educator, academic administrator, and Life Fellow of King's College, Cambridge.

== Early life and education ==
Born in Dublin, the youngest son of Henry Horatio Dixon, he was interested in science from a young age; his discovery of an optical illusion arising from binocular vision was described by his father in Nature Magazine when he was only nine years old.

After education at Shrewsbury School he was awarded a scholarship in 1946 to study Natural Sciences at King's College, Cambridge where his elder brother Kendal was a fellow, achieving firsts in Part I and Part II and specialising in biochemistry. He remained at King's for his graduate studies on peptide hormones, supervised by Frank Young, and was awarded a Ph.D. in 1954.

== Career ==
In 1953 he was elected to a Life Fellowship at King's, where he remained for the whole of his academic career, holding the positions of Financial Tutor (1956–1959), Director of Studies in Natural Sciences (1961–1981), Vice Provost (1981–1986) and Praelector (1989–1992), as well as co-editor of the College Register. In 1954 he was appointed as University Demonstrator in biochemistry, and in 1959 was promoted to University Lecturer. From 1964 to 1965, he worked at the Engelhardt Institute of Molecular Biology in Moscow as part of a UK-USSR exchange program.

Dixon was an editor of The Biochemical Journal, and was Deputy Chairman of the Editorial Board from 1977 to 1982. He was secretary of the Nomenclature Committee of the International Union of Biochemistry from 1977 to 1982 and chairman from 1983 to 1988, and after his retirement remained an advisory member.

Dixon's research in chemistry and biochemistry led to 136 published papers. His interests included the pH-dependence of enzyme-catalysed reactions, arsenic biochemistry, protein modification and other aspects of enzymology. His particular interest in applications of methods from organic chemistry to biochemistry led to a proposed treatment for Wilson's disease.

In 1957 he married Heather Spittle with whom he had three children. After his death, a set of rooms in the Gibbs' Building in King's College was named the Hal Dixon Rooms in his memory.
