= 2001 Birthday Honours =

British government recognitions

The Queen's Birthday Honours 2001 was announced on 16 June 2001 for the United Kingdom (including Northern Ireland), New Zealand (4 June), Australia (11 June), Barbados, Bahamas, Grenada, Papua New Guinea, Solomon Islands, Tuvalu, Saint Lucia, Saint Vincent and The Grenadines, Belize and Saint Christopher and Nevis on the occasion of the celebration of Her Majesty's Birthday.

Recipients of honours are displayed as they were styled before their new honour. They are arranged by the country whose ministers advised Queen Elizabeth II on the appointments, honour, degree and where appropriate by division (i.e. Civil and Military). The order of precedence is determined by each individual realm.

== United Kingdom ==
=== Knight Bachelor ===
- Professor George Sayers Bain, President and Vice Chancellor, The Queen's University of Belfast. For services to Higher Education and to the Low Pay Commission.
- Professor Anthony Edward Bottoms, Criminologist. For services to the Criminal Justice System.
- Percy James Butler, C.B.E., D.L. For charitable services, especially in Hampshire.
- Neil Robert Chalmers, Director, The Natural History Museum. For services to Museums.
- William Frederick Cotton, C.B.E., Chairman, Meridian Broadcasting. For services to Television Broadcasting and to Marie Curie Cancer Care.
- Donald Thomas Younger Curry, C.B.E., Chairman, Meat and Livestock Commission. For services to the Meat and Livestock Industries.
- Graham Martin Doughty, Leader, Derbyshire County Council. For services to Local Government.
- Joseph Anthony Dwyer, President, Institution of Civil Engineers. For services to Liverpool Vision.
- Terence (Terry) Farrell, C.B.E., Architect. For services to Architecture and Urban Design.
- James Galway, O.B.E. For services to music.
- Christopher Charles Gent, Chief Executive, Vodafone. For services to the Mobile Telecommunications Industry.
- Professor Robert Brian Heap, C.B.E., F.R.S. For services to Reproductive Biology and to International Science.
- Peter James Denton Job, Chief Executive, Reuters. For services to the Information and Media Industry.
- Professor John Andrew Likierman, Managing Director, Financial Management, Reporting and Audit, H.M. Treasury.
- Michael Nicholson Lord, Second Deputy Chairman of Ways and Means and a Deputy Speaker. For services to Parliament.
- Frank Budge Lowe. For services to the Advertising Industry and for charitable services.
- Professor Donald Neil MacCormick, M.E.P., Q.C., Regius Professor of Public Law, University of Edinburgh. For services to Scholarship in Law.
- Terence Hedley Matthews, O.B.E. For services to Industry and to Wales.
- Ian Mills, lately Regional Chairman, NHS Executive, London Regional Office. For services to the NHS.
- Robert Ogden, C.B.E., Chairman, Ogden Group of Companies. For charitable services in Yorkshire.
- Keith Povey, Q.P.M., H.M. Inspector of Constabulary. For services to the Police.
- Kevin Joseph Satchwell, Headteacher, Thomas Telford School, Shropshire. For services to Education.
- John Young Stewart, O.B.E. For services to Motor Racing.
- Peter Vardy, Chairman, Reg Vardy plc. For services to Business and to Education in North East England.
- Robert Brian Williamson, C.B.E., Chairman, LIFFE. For services to the Financial Services Industry.
- Professor Alan Geoffrey Wilson, Vice Chancellor, University of Leeds. For services to Higher Education.

=== Order of the Bath ===
==== Knight Commander of the Order of the Bath (KCB) ====
Military Division

- Vice Admiral Peter Spencer.
- Lieutenant General Anthony David Pigott, C.B.E., late Corps of Royal Engineers.

Civil Division

- William Robert McKay, C.B., Clerk of the House of Commons.
- Nicholas Lionel John Montagu, C.B., chairman, H.M. Board of Inland Revenue.
- Joseph Grant Pilling, C.B., Permanent Secretary, Northern Ireland Office.
- Muir Russell, Permanent Secretary, Scottish Executive.

==== Companion of the Order of the Bath (CB) ====
Military Division

- Rear Admiral Jeremy Michael de Halpert.
- Rear Admiral Iain Robert Henderson, C.B.E.
- Major General Liam Diarmuid Curran, late Corps of Royal Electrical and Mechanical Engineers.
- Major General Archibald Peter Neil Currie, late Royal Regiment of Artillery.
- Major General Ashley Ernest George Truluck, C.B.E. (486759), late Royal Corps of Signals.
- The Venerable The Archdeacon Anthony Peter Bishop, Q.H.C., Royal Air Force.
- Air Vice-Marshal Thomas William Rimmer, O.B.E., Royal Air Force.

Civil Division

- John Frederick Ballard, Director, Water and Land, Department of the Environment, Transport and the Regions.
- Colin Victor Balmer, Principal Finance Officer, Ministry of Defence.
- Miss Philippa Catherine Drew, Director, Education, Training, Arts and Sport, Department for Culture, Media and Sport.
- Peter David Ewins, Chief Executive, Meteorological Office, Ministry of Defence.
- David Clive Gowdy. For public service.
- Michael Stephen Dreese Granatt, Head, Government Information and Communication Service, Cabinet Office.
- Neil Stuart McKay, Chief Operating Officer, Department of Health.
- Andrew Christie Normand, Crown Agent, Crown Office and Procurator Fiscal Service, Scottish Executive.
- Peter Ray. Senior Civil Servant, Ministry of Defence.
- David Maxwell Salisbury, Principal Medical Officer, Department of Health.
- Stephen Wynn Boys Smith, Director General, Immigration and Nationality Directorate, Home Office.
- Anita, Mrs Straker, O.B.E., Director, Key Stage 3 Strategy, Department for Education and Employment.
- John McMaster Samuel Hugh Glenn Thompson, Director General, Northern Ireland Court Service, a Department of the Lord Chancellor.
- Gerald David Wynn, Director of Operations, GCHQ.

=== Order of St Michael and St George ===
==== Knight Grand Cross of the Order of St Michael and St George (GCMG) ====
- Sir John (Olav) Kerr, K.C.M.G., Head, H.M. Diplomatic Service.

==== Knight Commander of the Order of St Michael and St George (KCMG) ====
- Graham Hugh Boyce, C.M.G., H.M. Ambassador, Cairo.
- Richard Billing Dearlove, O.B.E., Chief, Secret Intelligence Service.
- David Geoffrey Manning, C.M.G., Permanent Representative, UKDel, NATO.
- Nicholas Vernon Scheele. For services to British Motor Exports.

==== Companion of the Order of St Michael and St George (CMG) ====
- Anthony John Abbott, O.B.E., Governor, Montserrat.
- Professor Michael Parker Banton, UN Committee for the Elimination of Racial Discrimination.
- Paul Michael Barrett, O.B.E. For services to SmithKline Beecham and to Export.
- Stuart Armitage Brooks, O.B.E., Counsellor, Foreign and Commonwealth Office.
- Edward Paul Ronald Cautley. For services to British Business Interests Overseas.
- David John Hall, Deputy Chief Executive, British Trade International.
- Anthony Hamilton Millard Kirk-Greene, M.B.E. For services to the History of Africa.
- David Charles Hartridge, lately Director, Services Division, World Trade Organization. For services to International Trade.
- John Andrew Patrick Hill, C.B.E. For services to British Trade Overseas.
- Peter Lawrence Hunt, lately H.M. Consul-General, Istanbul.
- Gerard Anthony Lemos. For services to the British Council.
- Peter Longworth, British High Commissioner, Harare.
- Miss Kaye Wight Oliver, O.B.E., British High Commissioner, Maseru.
- Professor Jonathan Dermot Spence. For services to the Study of Modern China.
- Charles Richard Vernon Stagg, H.M. Ambassador, Sofia.
- Selwyn Charles Cornelius Wheeler. For services to Broadcasting and Journalism Overseas.

=== Royal Victorian Order ===
==== Knight Grand Cross of the Royal Victorian Order (GCVO) ====
- Major Sir Hew Fleetwood Hamilton-Dalrymple, Bt., K.C.V.O., Captain General, The Queen's Body Guard for Scotland, Royal Company of Archers and Gold Stick for Scotland.

==== Knight Commander of the Royal Victorian Order (KCVO) ====
- Hugh Ashley Roberts, C.V.O., Director of the Royal Collection and Surveyor of The Queen's Works of Art.

==== Commander of the Royal Victorian Order (CVO) ====
- The Reverend Professor Peter William Brunt, O.B.E., lately Physician to The Queen in Scotland.
- Graham, Baron Kirkham, chairman, Joint Funding Board, The Duke of Edinburgh's Award, and Trustee, Outward Bound Trust.

==== Lieutenant of the Royal Victorian Order (LVO) ====
- The Honourable Peter Macleod Benson, lately Auditor, Ascot Authority.
- Dr William Ronald Davey, lately Physician to The Queen.
- William Peter Dwerryhouse. For Personal Services.
- Dr Douglas James Allan Glass, Apothecary to the Household at Balmoral.
- Mary, The Lady Nicholas Gordon Lennox, Lady in Waiting to Princess Alexandra, the Honourable Lady Ogilvy.
- Ian Donald McGregor, Assistant Keeper of the Privy Purse.
- Juliette Mary, Mrs Woolley, Director of Fundraising, The Duke of Edinburgh's Award.

==== Member of the Royal Victorian Order (MVO) ====
- Nicholas Stewart Archer, lately Assistant Private Secretary to The Prince of Wales.
- Martin David Clayton, Assistant Curator, Print Room, Royal Library, Windsor Castle.
- Colonel David Wallace Cooper (Retired), lately Director of The Prince's Scottish Youth Business Trust.
- Sergeant Robert Fulton, Royalty Protection Department, Metropolitan Police.
- James Leonard Jackson, R.V.M.*, Armourer, Royal Collection.
- John Hywel James, lately Volunteer, The Prince's Trust.
- Miss Sarah Suttor Key, Physiotherapist.
- Colin Francis McIntosh, President, Braemar Royal Highland Society.
- Miss Joy Margaret Quested-Nowell, Milliner to Queen Elizabeth The Queen Mother.
- Stephen Martin Pocklington, Head Teacher, Sandringham and West Newton School.
- Sergeant Paul Adrian Ronald Ridout, Royalty Protection Department, Metropolitan Police.
- Alan Peter Ryan, Assistant Property Manager, Buckingham Palace.
- Sergeant James Leonard Scottow, lately Royalty Protection Department, Metropolitan Police.
- Miss Mavis Gillian Shepheard, Assistant Clerk, Oxfordshire Lieutenancy.
- John Gordon (Jack) Sinclair, lately Bandleader.
- Miss Rosemarie Lynn Tart, Assistant Housekeeper, Buckingham Palace.
- Miss Angela Jane Wise, Personal Assistant to the Deputy Secretary, Duchy of Cornwall.

=== Royal Victorian Medal ===
==== Royal Victorian Medal (Gold) ====
- Edward Andrew Dodd, R.V.M., lately Gatekeeper, Balmoral Castle.
- Michael Christopher Martin Sealey, R.V.M.*, Chef to Queen Elizabeth The Queen Mother.
- William John Stephenson Tallon, R.V.M.*, Steward to Queen Elizabeth The Queen Mother.

==== Bar to the Royal Victorian Medal (Silver) ====
- Raymond Allington, R.V.M., Forestry Foreman, Sandringham Estate.
- Frederick George Benefer, R.V.M., Fruit Farm Manager, Sandringham Estate.
- Peter Colin Farrow, R.V.M., Lorry Driver, Sandringham Estate.
- Trevor Mace, R.V.M., Plumber, Sandringham Estate.

==== Royal Victorian Medal (Silver) ====
- George Benjamin Bell, Foreman, Property Section, Windsor Castle.
- John Reginald Clist, lately Parks Worker, Crown Estate, Windsor.
- Neil Cook, Ranger, Balmoral Estate.
- George William Cross, Craftsman Fitter, Crown Estate, Windsor.
- James Cecil Hadden, Principal Dresser to the Knights of the Thistle.
- George Herbert Laming, Carpenter, Crown Estate, Windsor.
- Allan David Masson, Mechanic, Balmoral Estate.
- Robert David McLean, Caretaker, Duchy of Lancaster, Cockfosters.
- Gordon Monteith, lately Gardener, Balmoral Estate.
- Patrick Shovelin, lately Liveried Messenger, St James's Palace.
- William John Sim, Farm Grieve, Balmoral Estate.
- Dennis Tomlin, lately Yeoman Bed Goer, The Queen's Body Guard of the Yeomen of the Guard.
- George Duncan Watt, Gamekeeper, Balmoral Estate.

=== Order of the Companions of Honour (CH) ===
- Sir Colin Rex Davis, C.B.E., Principal Conductor, London Symphony Orchestra. For services to Music.

=== Order of the British Empire ===
==== Dame Commander of the Order of the British Empire (DBE) ====
- Professor Ingrid Victoria Allen (Mrs Barnes Thompson), C.B.E., D.L. For services to Medical Research.
- Miss Eileen Atkins (Mrs Shepherd), C.B.E., Actress and Writer. For services to Drama.
- Wendy Patricia, Mrs Davies, Headteacher, Selly Park Technology College for Girls, Birmingham. For services to Education.
- Karlene Cecile, Mrs Davis, General Secretary, Royal College of Midwives. For services to Midwifery and to the NHS.
- Professor Julia Stretton Higgins, C.B.E., F.R.S., Professor of Polymer Science, Imperial College London. For services to Science.
- Miss Sheila Marshall McKechnie, O.B.E., Director, Consumers' Association. For services to Consumers.
- Professor Lesley Howard Rees, Director of Education, Royal College of Physicians. For services to Medical Education.
- Dela, Mrs Smith, Headteacher, Beaumont Hill Special School, Darlington. For services to Education for Children with Special Educational Needs.
- Professor Ann Marilyn Strathern, William Wyse Professor of Social Anthropology, University of Cambridge. For services to Social Anthropology.

==== Knight Commander of the Order of the British Empire (KBE) ====
- The Honourable Dr Howard Archibald Fergus, C.B.E., Former Speaker, Legislative Council, Montserrat.
- Air Marshal Roderick Harvey Goodall, C.B., C.B.E., A.F.C.*, Royal Air Force.
- Jeffrey Russell James, C.M.G., British High Commissioner, Nairobi.

==== Commander of the Order of the British Empire (CBE) ====
Military Division

- Commodore Barry Andrew Louis Goldman. Royal Navy.
- Commodore Fabian Henry Hiscock, OBE. Royal Navy.
- Group Captain Brian James Jerstice. Royal Air Force.
- Group Captain Peter Rennie Ollis. Royal Air Force.
- Air Commodore Peter William David Ruddock. Royal Air Force.
- Colonel Stephen Michael Andrews, MBE. Late Corps of Royal Electrical and Mechanical Engineers.
- Colonel Edward Bradley Lawrence Armitstead, OBE. Late Coldstream Guards.
- Colonel Anthony William King-Harman. Late Royal Regiment of Artillery.
- Major-General Murray Leslie Wildman. Late Corps of Royal Electrical and Mechanical Engineers.

Civilian Division

- Neville Abraham. Chairman, Groupe Chez Gerard. For services to the restaurant trade.
- David Acland, DL. Lately chairman, Royal National Lifeboat Institution. For services to maritime safety.
- Mohammed Ajeeb. For services to Local Government in Bradford, West Yorkshire.
- Miss Ingrid Carol Alexander. Chairman, Central Council for Education and Training in Social Work. For services to health and social care.
- James Andrews. Chief executive, Glasgow City Council. For services to Local Government in Scotland.
- Professor Elizabeth Nneka Anionwu. Head, Mary Seacole Centre for Nursing Practice, Thames Valley University. For services to nursing.
- David Bailey. Photographer and film maker. For services to art.
- Professor Rajinder Singh Bhopal. Alexander Bruce and John Usher Professor of Public Health Medicine, University of Edinburgh. For services to public health medicine.
- David James Bills. Director general, Forestry Commission.
- David Julian Bintley. Director, Birmingham Royal Ballet. For services to dance.
- Ms Joan Blaney. Board Member, Birmingham and Solihull TEC. For services to the Community Champions Fund.
- Mrs Joyce Alice Bridges. Divisional manager, Urban Policy Unit, Department of the Environment, Transport and the Regions.
- Walter Kenneth Brown. Principal, Liverpool Community College. For services to further education.
- Judge Neil McLaren Butter, QC. Senior Circuit Judge, Central London County Court. For services to the administration of justice.
- William John Charles. For services to Association Football.
- David Johnson Cohen. Trustee, David Cohen Family Charitable Trust. For charitable services, especially to the arts.
- John Kevin Conway. Principal, Greenhead College, Huddersfield, West Yorkshire. For services to further education.
- Professor Cary Lynn Cooper. BUPA Professor of Organisational Psychology and Health, UMIST. For services to health and safety.
- John Cornforth. Architectural Historian. For services to the Historic Built Environment.
- Mrs Paula Carolyn Diggle. Head of Savings and Pensions Policy, HM Board of Inland Revenue.
- James Thomson Donaldson. Lately chief inspector, Further Education Funding Council. For services to education.
- Peter Brian Ellwood. Group chief executive, Lloyds TSB Group plc. For services to banking.
- John Derek Evans. Chief Conciliator, ACAS, Department of Trade and Industry.
- Ms Margaret Exley. Director, Towers Perrin. For services to management in the public sector.
- Eric Watt Ferguson. Head of Parliamentary and Constitutional Division, Scotland Office.
- Professor Peter John Fleming. Professor of Infant Health and Development, University of Bristol. For services to the understanding of cot death.
- John Stanton Flemming. Member, Royal Commission on Environmental Pollution. For services to Economics and to Environmental Protection.
- Peter Freeman. For services to International Development.
- David Gilroy. Deputy chief inspector, Social Services Inspectorate, Department of Health.
- Stan Godfrey. Area director, Pensions and Overseas Benefits Directorate, Department of Social Security.
- Felicity Margaret Sue Goodey, DL. Chairman, Lowry Trust. For services to the regeneration of Salford Quays.
- Professor Julian Mary Goodfellow. Professor, Biomolecular Science, Birkbeck College, University of London. For services to biophysics.
- David Charles Green. Executive vice-president, Freight Transport Association. For services to transport.
- Raymond Jonathan Gubbay. Managing director, Raymond Gubbay Ltd. For services to music.
- Dennis George Gunn, QPM. Chief Constable, Cambridgeshire Constabulary. For services to the police.
- Professor Mark Peregrine Haggard. Director, MRC Institute of Hearing Research. For services to hearing research.
- John Keith Harding. Lately chief Probation Officer, Inner London Probation Service. For services to the Probation Service.
- The Rt Rev Robert Maynard Hardy. Bishop of Lincoln. For services to the Church of England, and to prisoners.
- Ms Nicola Harwin. For services to the Women's Aid Federation of England.
- Ian James Henderson. Chief executive, Land Securities plc. For services to the property industry.
- Keith Ronald Hirst. Lately Chair, Sandwell TEC. For services to Education, Training and Enterprise in the Black Country.
- Paul Richard Hodgkinson. Chief executive, Simons. For services to business.
- Mrs Patricia Alayne Hughes. Lately chief executive, London Borough of Sutton. For services to Local Government.
- James Hunter. Chairman, Highlands and Islands Enterprise. For services to the Highlands and Islands.
- Mrs Margaret Iles. Headteacher, St Mary's and St Peter's Primary School, Teddington, Surrey. For services to education.
- Christopher Richard Ivory. Lately Chair, North Yorkshire TEC and Yorkshire and Humber TECs Ltd. For services to training.
- Jeffrey Louis Jay. Consultant Ophthalmologist, Tennent Institute of Ophthalmology, Gartnavel General Hospital, Glasgow. For services to Ophthalmology.
- Miss Susan Linda Jennings. Director, National Patients Access Team. For services to the NHS.
- William Ian Ridley Johnston, QPM. Lately assistant commissioner, Metropolitan Police Service. For services to the police.
- David Harold Jones. Lately chief executive, National Grid. For services to the electricity supply industry.
- Professor Roger Mark Jowell. For services to the National Centre for Social Research.
- George Bernard Kessler. Lately deputy chair, LETEC and chairman, London TEC Council. For services to skills and business development.
- Kenneth John Knight, QFSM. Chief Fire Officer, West Midlands Fire Service. For services to the Fire Service.
- Kevin Adrian Lasbury. Divisional director, Highways Agency, Department of the Environment, Transport and the Regions.
- Christopher Frank Carandini Lee. Actor. For services to drama.
- Christopher Gray Lewis. Head, Offenders and Corrections Unit, Research, Development and Statistics Directorate, Home Office.
- Ms Shuna Taylor Lindsay. Leader, Airlift and Future Tanker Integrated Project Team, Ministry of Defence.
- Alastair David Lyons. For services to the Department of Social Security.
- Alasdair Uist Macdonald. Headteacher, Morpeth School, Tower Hamlets, London. For services to education.
- Douglas Marr. Headteacher, Banchory Academy. For services to secondary education in Scotland.
- Michael Craig-Martin. Artist. For services to art.
- Mrs Judith McLaggan. Assistant director, HM Board of Inland Revenue.
- David Rogerson Mellor, OBE. Designer. For services to design and manufacturing.
- Anthony Minghella. Writer and film director. For services to film drama.
- Professor Roger Michael Needham, FRS. Director, Cambridge Microsoft Research Laboratory. For services to computing.
- Christopher John Nicholls. Headteacher, Moulsham High School, Chelmsford, Essex. For services to education.
- Hugh Peden. Collector, HM Board of Customs and Excise.
- Roland John Phillips. Deputy head, Litigation Division, Treasury Solicitor's Department.
- Professor Michael Isaac Podro. Emeritus Professor of Art History and Theory, University of Essex. For services to art history.
- Nicholas Martin Prest. Chairman and chief executive, Alvis plc. For services to the defence industry.
- Anthony Francis Pryor. Chairman, Devonport Management Ltd. For services to the defence industry.
- Professor William Graham Richards. Chairman of Chemistry, University of Oxford. For services to chemistry.
- Jonathan Rickford. Lately project director, Company Law Review. For services to business.
- John Richard Rivers. Chair, Southern Derbyshire Employer Coalition. For services to the New Deal.
- Peter Rogers. Lately chief executive, ITC. For services to broadcasting.
- Michael David Ross. Chief executive, Scottish Widows. For services to the financial sector in Scotland.
- Philip Charles Ruffles, FRS. Director, Engineering and Technology, Rolls-Royce plc. For services to the aerospace and defence industries.
- Mrs Philippa Margaret Russell, OBE. Director, Council for Disabled Children. For services to disabled children and adults.
- Mrs Lucianne Sawyer. President, UK Home Care Association. For services to health care.
- Richard Gilbert Saxon. Chairman, Building Design Partnership. For services to construction procurement.
- Professor Peter John Selby. Director of Clinical Research, Imperial Cancer Research Fund. For services to cancer research and cancer care.
- Philip Edward Sellers. For services to accountancy and audit.
- Professor Robert William Ernest Shannon. For services to economic development.
- Samuel James Shields. For services to health care.
- Judge Ramesh Singh. Commissioner for Racial Equality, Wales. For services to race equality.
- Joseph Brian Smith. For public service.
- Professor Peter George Smith. London School of Hygiene and Tropical Medicine. For services to the Spongiform Encephalopathy Advisory Committee and to tropical disease research.
- Professor Peter Ian Stanley. Lately chief executive, Central Science Laboratory, Ministry of Agriculture, Fisheries and Food.
- Professor Elan Closs Stephens. Professor of Communications and Creative Industries, University of Aberystwyth. For services to the Welsh language.
- Graham Spencer Stirling. Lately chairman, Prosper. For services to education and training in Devon and Cornwall.
- Professor Nigel Clement Halley Stott. For services to primary care and general practice medicine.
- Professor Joan Kathleen Stringer. Principal and vice-patron, Queen Margaret University College. For services to higher education.
- William Taylor, QPM. HM Chief Inspector of Constabulary, Scotland. For services to the police.
- Professor Charles Tomlinson. Poet. For services to literature.
- Ivor Ward. Lately head, Personnel Management Group, HM Prison Service, Home Office.
- Alan Watson. Deputy Parliamentary Commissioner for Administration.
- Professor Hubert Frank Woods. For services to the Committee on Toxicity of Chemicals in Food, Consumer Products and the Environment.
- James Robertson Graeme Wright, DL. Lately Vice-Chancellor, University of Newcastle upon Tyne. For services to higher education.

Diplomatic and overseas

- Dr Cynthia Ruth Butlin. For services to the eradication of leprosy in India and Nepal.
- Albray Victor Butterfield, MBE. For services to the community, Providenciales.
- John Charles Galliano. Fashion Designer. For services to the fashion industry.
- Neil Trevor Kaplan, QC. For services to international arbitration.
- Robert Charles Lane. For services to British commercial and legal interests overseas.
- Donald Malpas, OBE. For services to the British community, São Paulo.
- Dudley Stuart John Moore. For services to Anglo-American film and theatre.
- Professor Simon Michael Schama. For services to history and art criticism.
- Dr Keith Mortimer Waddell, MBE. For services to the blind in Uganda.
- Googie Withers (Mrs. John McCallum), A.O. For services to British theatre, film and television.
- Theodore Zeldin. For services to literature and Anglo-French relations.

==== Officer of the Order of the British Empire (OBE) ====
- Barbara Ainger, lately Chief Executive, The Housing Finance Corporation. For services to Housing.
- Christopher Charles Kennedy Albiston. For services to the Police.
- Mohammed Ali, Founder, Quest for Economic Development (QED). For services to South Asian communities.
- Peter Riddle Allan, D. L. For services to the community, especially Business and Employment, in North East England.
- Frank Amadedon. For services to Community Relations in Wolverhampton.
- David Stuart Archbold. For services to the Transport Industry.
- Allan Arnott, lately chair, Greater Peterborough TEC/ CCTE. For services to Lifelong Learning.
- Professor Bernard Atkinson, Member, BBSRC Council. For services to Biotechnology.
- John Barrie Atkinson, J.P. For services to the Magistrates' Courts Service.
- Peter William Avery, Fellow of King's College, University of Cambridge. For services to Oriental Studies.
- Peter Badejo, Director, Badejo Arts. For services to Dance.
- Harry James Banks. For services to Coal Mining and to the community in County Durham.
- Brigadier Neil Barclay. For services to the Army Benevolent Fund in Shropshire.
- Professor Lorraine Florence Baric, Professorial Fellow, University of Salford. For services to Electricity Consumers.
- John Edward Barnes, lately Health Emergency Planning Adviser, South East Regional Office, Department of Health.
- Geoffrey Grant Fulton Barnett. For services to Voluntary Service Overseas.
- Professor Robin Michael Basker. For services to Dental Education.
- Mary Elizabeth La Trobe-Bateman, Director, Contemporary Applied Arts. For services to Crafts.
- Syed Nawazish Bokhari, Principal, Ernest Bevin College, Tooting, London. For services to Education.
- John Garfield Bourke. For services to the Probation Service.
- Geoffrey William Breeden, Community Fire Safety Officer. For services to the Fire Service and to Young People.
- Michael Francis Brennan, lately Head, Adoption Section, Department of Health.
- David Brodie, Founder Director, TaxAid. For services to Low Income Taxpayers.
- Robert Bruce Knight Broughton, Welsh Secretary, British Medical Association in Wales. For services to Medicine.
- Patrick Dominic Bryon, Lead Assessor, National Professional Qualification for Headship. For services to Education in Wales.
- Beatrice May Burgess, chair, Babies in Prison. For services to Prisoner Welfare.
- Hugh Thomas Burnett. For services to the community in Newhaven, East Sussex.
- David Edward Church. For services to the Richmond Society, Surrey.
- David Hamilton Clark, Director, Research and Innovation, EPSRC. For services to Research.
- Malcolm Brian Clark, lately Director, Queen Elizabeth's Foundation for Disabled People. For services to Disabled People.
- Rodney Jeremy Clark, lately Chief Executive, Sense. For services to Deafblind People.
- Leslie Clegg. For services to the Footwear Industry and to the community in Bacup, Lancashire.
- Simon Paul Clegg, Chief Executive, British Olympic Association. For services to Sport.
- Christine Mackenzie Cohen, chairman, Hampstead Heath Management Committee. For services to City Open Spaces.
- John Coleman, Director, Trust for the Study of Adolescence. For services to Youth Justice.
- Pauline Collins (Mrs. Alderton), Actress. For services to Drama.
- Howard John Cooper. For services to Farriery and Equine Welfare.
- Dorothy Patricia Copland. For services to Education and to Charities on the Isle of Man.
- John Frederick Corrin, Headteacher, Wensleydale Middle School, Blyth, Northumberland. For services to Education.
- Martin Courtis, Member, Radioactive Waste Management Advisory Committee. For services to Environmental Protection.
- Professor Margaret Josephine Cox, Professor of Information Technology in Education, King's College London. For services to Education.
- Milton Fitzroy Crosdale, Director, Nottingham and District Racial Equality Council. For services to Equal Opportunities.
- Barry Cryer, Writer and Broadcaster. For services to Comedy Drama.
- Peter John Dawe, Founder and Trustee, Dawe Charitable Trust. For services to the Internet Watch Foundation.
- Joanne Denney, Chief Executive, Institute of Grocery Distribution. For services to the Food and Grocery Trade.
- David Michael Dixon, General Medical Practitioner and chair, NHS Alliance. For services to Primary Health Care.
- Kate Doherty. For services to Education.
- Mark Dowd, chair, Mersey Travel. For services to Public Transport.
- Dennis Hathaway Drysdale, J.P. For services to the Hampshire Probation Committee and Board.
- Marjorie Durie, lately Director, Service Development, Ayrshire and Arran Health Board. For services to Nursing and to the NHS.
- Graham Patrick Dyer, Museum Curator, Royal Mint.
- Elizabeth Dorothy Earnshaw. For services to Golf.
- William Glyndwr Edmunds, Principal, Deeside College, Flintshire. For services to Further Education.
- Peter Brian Elliott, chairman, Governing Body, Northumberland College. For services to Further Education.
- Martin John Ellis. Grade B2, Defence Procurement Agency, Ministry of Defence.
- John Evans, assistant director, H.M. Board of Inland Revenue.
- John Daniel Evans, Founder, Hampshire Centre for Independent Living. For services to Disabled People.
- Anne Margaret Everall, Director, Young Readers UK. For services to Children's Librarianship in Birmingham.
- Diana Jacqueline Farragher, Physiotherapy Teacher. For services to the Treatment of Chronic Facial Paralysis.
- Danny Fellows, chairman, West Wales TEC. For services to Training and Employment.
- John Lloret Fells, Detective Inspector, National Criminal Intelligence Service. For services to the Police.
- Henry George Fetherstonhaugh. For services to the Forestry Commission.
- Professor Charles Arthur Fewson, Professor of Microbial Biochemistry, University of Glasgow. For services to Biological Science.
- Maureen Foers, Founder, Northern Business Centre (Humber) Ltd. For services to Small Business in Humberside.
- Colin Hamish Forsyth, lately General Dental Practitioner, Rutland. For services to Dental Care for Prisoners.
- Professor Robert Stewart Fowler, lately Principal and Chief Executive, Central School of Speech and Drama. For services to Higher Education.
- Ernst Fraenkel, chairman, Wiener Library. For services to Holocaust Scholarship.
- Keith Bertram Francis, Divisional Manager, Administrative Support and Estates Management, Office for Standards in Education.
- Thomas Michael Freeman, lately Chief Executive, Horizon NHS Trust, Hertfordshire. For services to People with Learning Disabilities.
- Philip Albert Friend, Equal Opportunities and Disability Consultant. For services to People with Disabilities.
- Susan Garland (Mrs. Worthington), Deputy chief executive, British Tourist Authority. For services to Tourism.
- Pauline Gaunt, Head, Transport Bill Co-ordination Team, Department of the Environment, Transport and the Regions.
- Anil Gholkar, Consultant Neuro-radiologist, Newcastle upon Tyne Hospitals NHS Trust. For services to Neurology.
- Robin Warwick Gibson, Chief Curator, National Portrait Gallery. For services to Museums.
- Trevor Greenwood. For services to Education.
- Professor Robert James Gurney, Director, NERC Environmental Systems Science Centre, University of Reading. For services to Earth Observation and to Environmental Science.
- John Guy, Principal, Farnborough Sixth Form College, Hampshire. For services to Education.
- Clifford Hardcastle. For services to the community, especially Education, in South East London.
- David Wynne Harding, Grade B1, Ministry of Defence.
- John Richard Harris, Senior Executive, McCain Foods (GB) Ltd. For services to the Potato Processing Industry.
- Derek Alfred Heasman, Headteacher, Dollis Junior School, Mill Hill, London. For services to Education.
- John David Hebblethwaite, Secretary, Liturgical Commission. For services to the Church of England.
- Martin Henry. For services to Export and to Business.
- Peter Hollis, Headteacher, Oaklands Community School, Southampton, Hampshire. For services to Education.
- Paul Hopkins, Headteacher, St. Gabriel's RC High School, Bury, Lancashire. For services to Education.
- David Kingsley Hyland, Special Casework Lawyer, Crown Prosecution Service.
- Doris Ingham. For services to the Women's Section, Royal British Legion.
- Marjorie Elizabeth Jackson, Executive Nurse Director. For services to Health Care in London.
- Colin Leslie Jones, lately Secretary, Welsh Local Government Association. For services to Local Government.
- Professor Dylan Marc Jones, Professor, School of Psychology, University of Cardiff. For services to Military Science.
- Margaret Anne Jones, lately Chief Executive, Brook. For services to Family Planning.
- Richard Owen Phillips Jones, Head, Amman Valley School, Ammanford. For services to Education.
- Professor Peter Ignaz Paul Kalmus. For services to Physics.
- Kartar Singh Kathuria, Executive Member and Treasurer, Kirklees Racial Equality Council. For services to Ethnic Minority Communities in Huddersfield and Kirklees, West Yorkshire.
- Maurice Kench, lately chairman, Royal United Kingdom Beneficent Association. For charitable services to Elderly People.
- David William Andrew Kerr. For public service.
- Professor Richard Ian Kitney, Professor of Biomedical Systems Engineering, Imperial College London. For services to IT in Health Care.
- Marie Knott, Clinical Nurse Specialist, Kendray Hospital, Barnsley. For services to Health Care for Elderly People.
- Zara Lamont, Director, Construction Best Practice Programme. For services to the Construction Industry.
- Carol Alison Laws, Headteacher, Wheatfields Junior School, St. Albans Hertfordshire. For services to the Promotion of 'Safer Routes' for School Journeys.
- Josephine Laycock, Physiotherapist. For services to Incontinence Care.
- Albert Barry Leese, managing director, Epichem Ltd. For services to the Defence Industry.
- George Moir Leslie, managing director, George Leslie Ltd. For services to Civil Engineering and Construction.
- Valerie Ellen Le Valliant, lately Director, Jones Lang LaSalle. For services to Architecture and to the community in East London.
- Ronald William Lofthouse, lately Vice Chairman, Merseyside TEC. For services to Training.
- Norman Ralph Lowe. Managing Director, Enviro Consulting. For services to the Water Industry and to Environmental Protection.
- Roger Clark Lowry. For charitable services to Health Care.
- John Archie Macaskill, chairman, Crofters' Commission. For services to the Highlands and to Crofting.
- Sheena MacFarlane, International Vice President, Girls' Brigade. For services to the Girls' Brigade.
- Henrietta Maciver, Chief Executive, Turning Point Scotland. For services to Women Offenders and Drug Misusers.
- Colonel Robert Hugh MacKeith. For services to the Cadet Forces.
- Angus Alexander MacKenzie. For services to Health Charities in the Highlands.
- Gordon David Mackenzie, Headteacher, Balwearie High School, Kirkcaldy. For services to Secondary Education.
- David Madden. For services to the Police.
- Gilbert Madley. For services to the Royal Air Forces Association in North West England.
- Mohinder Singh Mahi, Grade 7, OFTEL, Department of Trade and Industry.
- Anne Mary Mallinson, J.P. For services to the community in London.
- Patrick Gerald Mallon. For public service.
- Terence Michael Mason, J.P. For services to the Berkshire Association of Young People.
- Nicholas David Maurice. For services to OXFAM.
- John Joseph Anthony McCann, Deputy Collector, H.M. Board of Customs and Excise.
- James Allan McColl, chairman, Clyde Blowers plc. For services to the Engineering Industry.
- Kevin McCormack, lately President, Justices' Clerks' Society. For services to the Criminal Justice System.
- Douglas Christopher Patrick McDougall. For services to Financial Services Regulation.
- Michael Anthony McFarlane. For services to Athletics and to the Duke of Edinburgh's Award.
- Seamus McGarvey, Business and Quality Adviser, H.M. Board of Inland Revenue.
- John Charles McGinnis. For services to the Construction Industry.
- George McGregor, lately Director of Estates, Greater Glasgow Primary Health Services NHS Trust. For services to the NHS.
- Catherine Margaret McMahon, Road Safety Research Co-ordinator, Department of the Environment, Transport and the Regions.
- Henry Campbell McMurray, Director, Royal Naval Museum, Ministry of Defence.
- Professor Jane Millar. For services to Social Policy Research.
- Christopher Gregory Michael Mills. For services to the Textile Industry.
- John Francis Brake Mitchell, Grade JL1, Meteorological Office, Ministry of Defence.
- Peter Morgan, lately deputy director in Wales, Employment Service, Department for Education and Employment.
- Roger Thomas Thorpe Morgan. For services to Young People in Care.
- John Walker Motson. For services to Sports Broadcasting.
- Walter Mowbray, Prison Service Budget Manager, H.M. Prison Service, Home Office.
- Henry Murdoch, chairman, Environment and Land Use Committee, National Farmers' Union of Scotland. For services to Agriculture.
- Rosemary Murphy, Chief Executive, National Day Nurseries Association. For services to Early Years Education.
- Jurat Barbara Myles. For services to the community in Jersey.
- Andrew Nelson, Executive Chairman, IQE. For services to the Electronics Industry.
- Roy Noble, Radio Presenter. For services to the community and to Charities in Wales.
- Humphrey Thomas Norrington. For charitable services.
- Michael Gordon Noyland, assistant director, H.M. Board of Inland Revenue.
- Antony Stuart Nunn, Marine Underwriter. For services to the Marine Insurance Industry.
- Derek Charles Oakey, Head, Branch B, Criminal Justice Division, Lord Chancellor's Department.
- Robin Francis Leigh Oakley. For services to Political Journalism.
- Ben Okri, Writer. For services to Literature.
- Hugh Stephen Roden Orde, Deputy Assistant Commissioner, Metropolitan Police Service. For services to the Police.
- Linda Ormiston, Opera Singer. For services to Opera.
- Wayne Otto. For services to Karate.
- David Andrew Arlwydd Owen, Chief Executive, Medical Research Council Technology. For services to Medical Research and Technology Transfer.
- Peter Craig Paisley. For services to Local Government and to the community in Glasgow.
- William Brian Parker, Principal Community Education Officer, Coventry, West Midlands. For services to Education.
- Professor Christine Pascal, chair, Early Childhood Education, Centre for Research in Early Childhood, University College Worcester. For services to Early Years Education.
- Naina Patel, Founder of Policy Research Institute on Aging and Ethnicity (PRIAE), For services to ethnic minority elderly in the UK and Europe.
- Meena Pathak, Product Developer, Patak Spices. For services to the Food Industry.
- Ann Payne, lately Head of Manuscripts, British Library. For services to Manuscripts Scholarship.
- Fiona Natalie Peel, chair, Gwent Health Authority. For services to the NHS.
- Arlene Phillips, Choreographer. For services to Dance.
- John Leigh Phillips. For services to Agriculture in Wales.
- Sally Joyce Phillips. For services to Family Planning Services in Cornwall.
- Anne Pigott. For services to the National Association of Prison Visitors.
- John Joseph Pike, lately chair, Greater Nottingham TEC. For services to Education and Training.
- Peter David Poore. For services to Save the Children.
- Colin Preece, Accountant, House of Lords.
- John Stephen Rowland Pugh, Head, Business Services Division, Health and Safety Executive, Department of the Environment, Transport and the Regions.
- Christine Reid, Member, North Wiltshire District Council. For services to Local Government.
- Anne Barbara Ridler, Author. For services to Literature.
- John Finbar Riordan, medical director, North West London Hospitals Trust. For services to Medical Management.
- Professor Lewis Duthie Ritchie. For services to General Practice and Primary Care Medicine in Scotland.
- Colonel Alan Clive Roberts, M.B.E., D.L. For services to the community in Leeds, West Yorkshire.
- Dennis Arthur Roberts. For services to the Royal Star and Garter Home.
- Anna Robertson. For services to the British Red Cross Society in Devon.
- Edward Heron Robson, Director, Teaching Company Directorate. For services to Competitiveness.
- Yvonne Rose, Governor, East Yorkshire College, East Yorkshire. For services to Further Education.
- Richard Henry Sedgwick, Grade 7, Benefits Agency, Department of Social Security.
- David Shakespeare, Leader, Buckinghamshire County Council. For services to Local Government.
- Alan Shearer. For services to Association Football.
- Lilias Mulgrave Sheepshanks. For services to the Royal Hospital School, Holbrook.
- Sylvia Sheridan, Founder, Independent Media Support Ltd. For services to Broadcasting.
- Arnold Joseph Simanowitz. For services to Victims of Medical Accidents.
- The Very Reverend Colin Bruce Slee, Dean of Southwark. For services to the community.
- Andrea Pamela Smith, chair, Lincolnshire Careers Guidance Services. For services to Training.
- Brian Smith, Chief Executive, Lite-On Ltd. For services to Education and Training.
- John Louis Charles Raymond Shurmer Smith, Dean, faculty of the Environment, University of Portsmouth. For services to Higher Education.
- Mary Catherine Smith, Founder Member and lately chair, Knowle West Against Drugs. For services to the community in Knowle West, Bristol.
- Ian Alexander Snedden, Head, Fire Services and Emergency Planning Division, Scottish Executive.
- Susan Sommers, Outreach Services Manager, Thames Reach Housing Association. For services to Homeless People in London.
- William Howard Speirs. For services to Trade Relations with China.
- Ian Stark, M.B.E. For services to Equestrian Sport.
- Roger Stephenson. For services to Architecture.
- John Watt Stevenson, chairman, Scottish Dental Practice Board. For services to NHS Dental Services in Scotland.
- Moira Stuart, Presenter, BBC. For services to News Broadcasting.
- Carolyn Swain, lately Principal Manager, Qualifications and Curriculum Authority. For services to Education.
- Alan William Taylor, Area Director, H.M. Board of Inland Revenue.
- Eric Raymond Taylor, chairman, Rehab Scotland. For services to the Rehabilitation of People with Disabilities.
- John Taylor, Director, European Supply Chain, Unilever. For services to the Chemical Industry.
- John Pearce Thackray, managing director, Kapitex Healthcare Ltd. For services to the Health Care Industry.
- Neil Thomason, Senior Civil Servant, Ministry of Defence.
- Bernard Tidball, Editorial Supervisor of the Vote, House of Commons.
- Anthony George Merrik, Lord Tryon, D.L. For services to the Salisbury Cathedral Trust.
- Christopher Paul Turner, Principal, Brixham Community College, Devon. For services to Education.
- Kenneth Vowles, executive director, UK Power Operations, Scottish Power. For services to the Electricity Industry.
- Robert James Walker, Director of Operations, Scottish Fisheries Protection Agency, Scottish Executive.
- David McDonald Warren. For services to the North Highland College and to the community in Thurso, Caithness.
- William Ernest Warren, Head, Intelligent Client Services, PACE, H.M. Treasury.
- Robert Andrew Watson. For services to the Meat Industry.
- Robert Drennan Watson, Founding Chairman, Scottish Environment Link. For services to Environmental Management.
- Dermot Roger Marriott Weatherup. For services to Heritage Preservation.
- Hubert Maurice William Weedon, Guitarist. For services to Music.
- David Charles Whalley. For services to Regeneration in Barnsley, South Yorkshire.
- Kate Whiteford, Artist. For services to Art.
- The Reverend Canon David John Whittington. For services to the community in Stockton-on-Tees.
- Julia Whybrew, Personnel Officer, ES Directorate, Department of Trade and Industry.
- John Widdrington, Business Manager, Vickers Defence Systems. For services to the Defence Industry.
- Michael Anthony Widdrington, Senior Assembly Counsel, National Assembly for Wales.
- John Arthur Wilkinson. For services to the community in Salford, Greater Manchester.
- Dennis Sidney Cyril Williams, Grade B2, Defence Procurement Agency, Ministry of Defence.
- Elisabeth Evan Williams, J.P. For services to the Administration of Justice in North East England.
- Peter James Wilson, Director, Projects and Estates, Tate Gallery. For services to Museums.
- Professor Thomas Black Wilson, Principal, Glasgow College of Building and Printing. For services to Further Education.
- William Thompson Wright. For services to Industry and to the community.
- Keith Dunckley Yates, Chief Executive, Stirling Council. For services to Local Government.
- Paul Young, Chief Fire Officer, Devon Fire and Rescue Service. For services to the Fire Service.
- Peter Andrew Young, deputy director and Chief Scientist, Home Office.

Diplomatic and overseas

- Iqbal Ahmed. For services to international trade.
- Ms Ann Rosemary Arnott, Director, British Council, Ethiopia.
- David Thomas Baldwin, Director, British Council, Syria.
- Peter Spencer Bayliff. For services to British education in The Netherlands.
- Ms Jane Mallory Birkin. For services to acting and UK-French cultural relations.
- Dr. Susan Margaret Black. For services to forensic anthropology, Kosovo.
- John Douglas Bradley, lately Senior Adviser, Common External Services, European Commission.
- Leslie Bricusse, Writer-Composer-Lyricist. For services to the film industry and the theatre.
- Ian James Campbell. For services to UK Exports.
- Patrick Anthony Connolly, Senior Management Officer, British Embassy, Peking.
- Richard Ogilby Leslie Fraser Darling, Counsellor, Foreign and Commonwealth Office.
- Barrie Victor Dingle. For services to British commercial interests in Indonesia.
- Cecil Raymond Dismont, M.B.E. For service to the community, Bermuda.
- Dr. Patrick Duncan. For services to scientific researchcoverseas.
- Miss Haruko Fukuda. For services to UK-Japanesecrelations.
- Noel Joseph Guckian, Deputy Head of Mission, British Embassy, Tripoli.
- Peter Sexty Guest. For services to British commercial interests in Korea.
- Bruce Campbell Harris. For services to childcare advocacy in Latin America.
- Dr. Georgina Wendy Herrmann, Director, International Merv Project, Turkmenistan.
- Malcolm Geoffrey Hilson, lately High Commissioner, Vanuatu.
- Nigel Mark Anthony Hubbard. For services to the community and British commercial interests in Guatemala.
- Sister Barbara Denise Jaggar. For services to nursing education in Uganda.
- Dominic James Robert Jermey, lately British Representative in East Timor.
- Robert Jobbins, Director, World Service News andvProgramme Commissioning, BBC World Service.
- John Trevor Jones. For services to exports.
- Martin Gerriets Kelsey. For services to Save thevChildren in South America.
- Philip Anthony Knight, British Honorary Consul-General, Antwerp.
- Michael David Laidler, lately Head, EU Delegation, South Africa.
- Jonathan Bailey Lewis. For services to Britishccommercial interests, Italy.
- Everton Byron Merchant, Director, Audit, British Council HQ.
- Willie Kong Sang Mok. For services to the welfare of ex-servicemen in Hong Kong.
- John Wainwright Newman. For services to the community, St. Helena.
- Bertrand Beresford Osborne, M.B.E. For public service, Montserrat.
- Linford Ainsworth Pierson, J.P. For public service, Cayman Islands.
- Dr. Robert Andrew Reekie, Regional Medical Officer, British High Commission, Dhaka.
- George James Riches. For services to exports.
- Dr. Marion Robinson. For public service, Bermuda.
- Miss Marion Rosenberg. For services to the British film industry.
- Michael Lloyd Ross. For services to British commercial interests in Iran.
- Robin Malcolm Smeaton. For services to British interests in Spain.
- Andrew Nicholas Stern. For services to British commercial interests, Nigeria.
- Terence John Stone. For services to international trade.
- Professor Peter Savvas Vanezis. For services to forensic pathology, Kosovo.
- Diarmid James Williams, lately Head of Council Secretariat, WEU.
- Dr. David Balcombe Wingate, M.B.E. For public service, Bermuda.
- Michael Alan Young. For services to international human rights.

==== Member of the Order of the British Empire (MBE) ====
- John Aitken, T.D. For services to the community in the Scottish Borders.
- George Allan Alexander, Technology Teacher, Rossie Secure Unit, Montrose. For services to Craft and Design Education.
- Gerry Anderson. For services to Animation.
- Derek Andrew, Managing Director-Retail, Wolverhampton and Dudley Brewery plc. For services to the Brewing Industry.
- Miss Joan Anita Barbara Armatrading, Singer and songwriter. For services to Music.
- Charles Terence Armstrong. For services to the Fire Service.
- John Harvey Ashdown. For services to Conservation in Oxford.
- Marguerite Grace, Mrs. Ashley, J.P., Executive Officer, Department of Social Security.
- Brian Aspen. For services to Wrestling.
- Janice, Mrs. Aspinall, Acting Hospital Manager, Selby War Memorial Hospital, North Yorkshire. For services to Flood Relief.
- Miss Christine Atkinson. For services to the community in Flint Mountain, Flintshire.
- Angela Rosemary, Mrs. Avis. For services to Complementary Therapies in Nursing.
- Victoria, Mrs. Adetimole-Babalola, lately Typing Manager, H.M. Board of Inland Revenue.
- Ms Kate Bailey. For services to the Dundee Science Centre.
- John Kibwara Atwoki Bakanoba, Member, Meltham Town Council, West Yorkshire. For services to the community.
- Thomas Baker, Teacher, Red Rose Primary School, Chester-Le-Street, County Durham. For services to Education.
- Kenneth Barclay. For charitable services in Penzance, Cornwall.
- Stuart Lothian Barclay. For services to Swimming and Sailing for Disabled People in Scotland.
- Sylvia Joyce, Mrs. Barclay, D.L. For services to Swimming and Sailing for Disabled People in Scotland. *Suzanne Louise Bardgett, Project Director, Holocaust Exhibition, Imperial War Museum. For services to Holocaust Education.
- Philip Henry Barley. For services to the TGWU in the West Midlands.
- Ann Penelope Storrs, Mrs. Barlow. For services to the community, especially Riding for the Disabled, in Abingdon, Oxfordshire.
- Charles Barnes. For services to the community, especially the St Raphael Club for Physically Disabled People, in Saffron Walden, Essex.
- Jean Doris, Mrs. Barnes. For services to the community, especially the St Raphael Club for Physically Disabled People, Saffron Walden, Essex.
- Margaret Isabella Ann, Mrs. Barnes, lately Manager, Scottish Seed Potato Classification Scheme, Scottish Executive.
- Ms Moyna Barnham. For services to the Prevention of Domestic Violence in Colchester, Essex.
- Victoria Joanne, Mrs. Barrett, Leading Ambulancewoman, Warwickshire Ambulance Service. For services to Health Care.
- Dorothy Jean, Mrs. Barton, Waitress, the Black Swan, York. For services to the Catering Trade.
- Sian, Mrs. Bates, lately Deputy Chief Executive, AZTEC, London. For services to Training and Education.
- Ann Veronica, Mrs. Beere, Clerk, Slindon Parish Council, West Sussex. For services to the community.
- Eunice Cynthia, Mrs. M Ghie-Belgrave, Founder, Shades of Black. For services to Community Relations in Birmingham.
- Susan Wemyss, Mrs. Bender, Executive Officer, Department of Social Security.
- Hazel Winifred, Mrs. Benjamin. For services to Disabled People and their Carers in Wales.
- Duncan Herman Berndt, Divisional Officer, Strathclyde Fire Brigade. For services to the Fire Service.
- Tessa, Mrs. Berridge. For services to the League of Friends of the Royal United Hospital, Bath.
- Philip Henry Berry. For services to the Llandough Hospital and the League of Friends, Vale of Glamorgan.
- The Reverend Esme Christina Beswick, Founder, Joint Council of Anglo-Caribbean Churches. For services to Community Relations in London.
- Bachan Singh Bhalla. For services to Community Relations in Cambridgeshire.
- Ramakant Ramgopal Bhartia, General Medical Practitioner, South Yorkshire. For services to Health Care.
- Leonard Ernest Bint. For services to the Day Hospital, St. George's Hospital, Hornchurch, Essex.
- Iain Birrell, Director of Operations, Lang Brothers Ltd. For services to Industry.
- Anthony Reginald Blake. For services to the community, especially Churches Acting Together, in Whitley Bay, Tyne and Wear.
- Percy John Blakey. For services to the WRVS in West Yorkshire.
- Anthony Gordon Blunt, Director General, Hearing Dogs for Deaf People. For services to Deaf People.
- Peter John Boland, Special Constable, Lothian and Borders Police. For services to the Police.
- Joy, Mrs. Bome. For services to the community, especially Music, in Chelmsford, Essex.
- John Carradale Bostock, J.P., D.L. For services to the community, especially the Magistracy, in Ripon, North Yorkshire.
- Wallace Henry Bosustow, Station Officer, Porthoustock Rescue Team, Auxiliary Coastguard Service. For services to the community in Cornwall.
- Sidney William Boulton. For services to the Chatterley Whitfield Colliery Museum in Staffordshire.
- Michael David Box. For services to the Criminal Justice System.
- Ms Valerie Box. For services to Cancerlink.
- Dermot Boyle, lately Chief Executive, Refugee Arrivals Project. For services to Asylum Seekers and Refugees. *Miss Janet Bradford, Deputy Registrar (Awards and Governance), Southampton Institute of Higher Education. For services to Higher Education.
- Gail Cameron, Mrs. Bridgman, medical director, Mid Essex Community and Mental Health NHS Trust. For services to Paediatrics.
- Miss Julia Mary Briggs. For services to the community, especially the Children's Society, in Great Barton, Suffolk.
- Diana Sylvia Henrietta, Mrs. Brimblecombe. For services to Animal Rescue Wokingham, Berkshire.
- Philip William Broadhurst, musical director, Audley Male Voice Choir. For services to the community in Stoke-on-Trent, Staffordshire.
- Wilfred Broadhurst. For services to the Warrington Hospital Radio Service, Cheshire.
- Ernest Brodrick. For charitable services in Ryton, Tyne and Wear.
- Christine Mary, Mrs. Bromwich, School Secretary, Murston Junior School, Sittingbourne, Kent. For services to Education.
- Miss Betty Brown. For services to the community, especially the Guide Dogs for the Blind Association, Roxburghshire.
- Douglas Edward Brown, Supervisor, Highways Crew, Maidstone Borough Council. For services to Flood Relief in Yalding, Kent.
- Lloyd George Brown, Prison Officer, H.M. Prison Ranby, H.M. Prison Service, Home Office.
- Mary Elizabeth, Mrs. Brown. For services to the community in Powys.
- Valerie, Mrs. Brown, Foster Carer. For services to the Islington Parents of Children with Special Educational Needs.
- Peter William Forrest Browne, Solicitor. For services to those with Legal Disputes.
- Jacqueline Sally, Mrs. Brownjohn. For services to Save the Children in Sherborne, Dorset.
- John Richard Brunsdon. For services to Conservation in Glastonbury, Somerset.
- Sheila Jean, Mrs. Burgess. For services to the community in Nantwich and Crewe, Cheshire.
- Robert Burn, lately Caretaker, Highgate Primary School, Haringey, London. For services to Education.
- Peter Burns, Facilities and Service Director, Marconi. For services to the community in Coventry, Warwickshire.
- Anthony Burton. For services to Mentally Disabled People in Stroud, Gloucestershire.
- Miss Margaret Ann Butler, Full Time Youth and Community Worker, Silver Felix Youth Club, Hythe, Kent. For services to Young People.
- Michael John Butler, Head of Security, University of Birmingham. For services to Higher Education.
- Unity Mary Nina, Mrs. Byles. For services to the community in West Meon, Hampshire.
- Anne, Mrs. Byrne, Sister Midwife, The Queen Mother's Hospital, Glasgow. For services to Nursing and Midwifery.
- John Byrne, Playwright. For services to Literature and the Theatre.
- James Watson Campbell. For services to the Dee (Kirkcudbright) District Salmon Fishery Board.
- Peter Edward Capel. For services to the Lighthouse Club.
- Margaret, Mrs. Carey, J.P., Director, Inside Out Trust. For charitable services.
- Margaret Frances, Mrs. Carey. For services to the National Trust of Guernsey.
- Miss Rosemary Carpenter. For services to Plant Biology.
- Robert Carson. For services to the Construction Industry.
- Eileen Margaret Rose, Mrs. Casley. For services to the community in Wilton, Wiltshire.
- Dennis Cato. For services to the Licensed Trade and to the community in Kenilworth, Warwickshire.
- John William Chadwick, Community Fire Safety Officer, Derbyshire Fire and Rescue Services. For services to the Fire Service.
- Janet, Mrs. Champion. For services to Breast Cancer Patients in Ashford and St Peters Hospitals, Surrey. *Christopher David Channon. For services to the community, especially Disabled People, in Nottingham.
- Albert John Chant, Club Leader and Honorary Treasurer, Figheldean Youth Club, Salisbury, Wiltshire. For services to Young People.
- Captain John Chapman. For services to the Fishing Industry.
- Lynn Christine, Mrs. Chapman, Inland Revenue Enquiry Counter Receptionist, H.M. Board of Inland Revenue. *Moira, Mrs. Chapman, J.P., Lately Member, Cheshire County Council. For services to the community.
- Kathleen Doris, Mrs. Charles. For services to Health Care in Llanelli.
- David William Cheetham, lately Paramedic Emergency Control Manager. For services to the Greater Manchester Ambulance Service.
- Carl Steven Alfred Chinn. For services to the community, especially Local History, in the West Midlands.
- Tanweer Saif Chowdhury, Grade 10 (Analyst), Metropolitan Police Service. For services to the Police. *Reginald Braithwaite Chrimes, Deputy Leader, Ellesmere Port and Neston Borough Council. For services to Local Government in Cheshire.
- Richard Gilbert Clark. For services to the community in Edinburgh.
- Angela, Mrs. Clarke, Driver, Ring and Ride, Honiton, Devon. For services to the community.
- Patrick George Clarke, J.P. For services to the community, especially the Police, in the West Midlands.
- Marjorie Marina, Mrs. Clent. For services to the community in Caynham, Shropshire.
- Gemma, Mrs. Clive. For charitable services, through Turville Books, in Oxfordshire.
- Jessie, Mrs. Coghill. For services to the UKAEA Constabulary.
- Margaret Elizabeth Lendrum, Mrs. Cohen, General Medical Practitioner. For services to the Derby Breast Clinic.
- Peter Spencer Collins. For services to Motor Cycle Racing.
- Stephen Russell Collins, Relief Worker. For humanitarian services.
- Graham Commons, Overhead Linesman, National Grid. For services to the Electricity Supply Industry. *Christine, Mrs. Cooper. Human Resources Administrator, Insolvency Service, Department of Trade and Industry.
- Miss Denise Corby, Treat Official Correspondence Officer, Department of Health.
- Joyce Edwina, Mrs. Corlett. For services to the community in the Isle of Man.
- Ernestene Marsha, Mrs. Corper, Higher Executive Officer, Health and Safety Executive, Department of the Environment, Transport and the Regions.
- Miss Ann Corrigal. For services to People withLearning Disabilities in Elgin, Morayshire.
- Pearl Lillian Ann, Mrs. Cory. For charitable services in St. Teath, Cornwall.
- George Walter Cowan, Betting and Gaming Liaison Officer, H.M. Board of Customs and Excise.
- Raymond Anthony Cox. For services to the Advisory Committee on Dangerous Substances, Health and Safety Commission
- Maurice Peter Coxhead. For services to Drama. Pamela Patricia, Mrs. C. For services to Elderly People in Bristol.
- George Crombie. For services to the community in Great Hampden, Buckinghamshire.
- Marion, Mrs. Crosbie, Member, Education Department, H.M. Prison Dartmoor. For services to the Rehabilitation of Offenders through Education.
- Miss Joan Crothers. For services to the Community. Susan, Mrs. C, managing director, PGI Spearhead Exhibitions Ltd. For services to Export.
- Fred Crow, Special Projects Adviser, Tyneside TEC. For services to Training.
- Albert Edward Curran, Teacher, St Michael's School, Billingham, Teesside. For services to Education.
- Walter George Edward Curran, Leading Fire Fighter, Defence Fire Service, Ministry of Defence.
- Christopher Robert Curtis, Head of Product Technology, Hanson Quarry Products Europe. For services to the Aggregates Industry.
- Nellie, Mrs. Curtis. For services to Macmillan Cancer Relief in Midhurst, Hampshire.
- Theodore Alexander Gordon Dalgleish. For services to the War Pensions Committee in Kent.
- Parvin, Mrs. Damani, Multicultural Adviser, Southampton and South West Hampshire Health Authority. For services to Health Care.
- Ian Arthur Darrington, musical director, Wigan Youth Jazz Orchestra. For services to Music.
- Jean, Mrs. David. For services to the Citizens Advice Bureau and to the community in Barry, Vale of Glamorgan.
- Lisbeth David. For services to the community in Llandaff, Cardiff.
- Carwyn Rhys Davies, Postman. For charitable services in Romania.
- Christopher Davies. For services to Yachting.
- John Tudor Davies. For services to Music in North Wales.
- Samuel Eifion Davies, assistant director, Mental Health and Learning Disabilities, St David's Hospital, Carmarthenshire. For services to Health Care.
- Bryan Leslie Davis, Superintendent, West Midlands Police. For services to the Police.
- Jennette Margaret, Mrs. Davy, Member, Worcestershire County Council. For services to the community in Malvern.
- Frances Mary, Mrs. Day. For services to OXFAM in Newport, South Wales.
- Mary Elizabeth, Mrs. Dean, lately Grade E1, Ministry of Defence.
- The Venerable Peter Anthony Delaney. For services to the community in the City of London.
- David Richard Dellow, Station Commander (Retained), Hertfordshire Fire and Rescue Service. For services to the Fire Service.
- Ms Rani Dhir. For services to Scottish Homes.
- John Samuel Diggory, Assistant Supervising Officer, Cleansing, Shrewsbury and Atcham Borough Council. For services to Flood Relief.
- Ms Margaret Kathleen Dight, Director, Catholic Children's Society, Nottingham. For services to Adoption.
- Joan Ann, Mrs. Dillon. For services to the Labour Relations Agency.
- Albert Edward Donkin, Member, Mayoral Bodyguard. For services to the City of Durham.
- Alison, Mrs. Douglas, General Medical Practitioner,
- John Raymond Dow, Prison Officer, H.M. Prison Ashwell, HM Prison Service, Home Office.
- Sylvia, Mrs. Dow, Grade E1, Ministry of Defence.
- David John Downham. For services to the community, especially the Braille Guild, in Pontefract, West Yorkshire.
- Antony John Drake, Gloucestershire Area Footpath Secretary, Ramblers' Association. For services to Public Rights of Way.
- David Dunbar. For services to the community, especially the St Marylebone Housing Association, London.
- Edna, Mrs. Dunbar. For services to Housing for People with Special Needs.
- Joan Elizabeth, Mrs. Duncan. For services to the Yorkshire Wildlife Trust.
- Pamela Kathleen Morton, Mrs. Duncan. For services to Children's Choral Singing in Edinburgh.
- William McCartney Dunlop, B.E.M. For services to Cultural Heritage.
- Alfred Noel Eagleson. For public service.
- Janet, Mrs. Eagleton. For services to Sporran Making.
- Miss Wendy Ebsworth, Sign Language Interpreter. For services to Music.
- Victor Ecclestone, Director of Multi A, Bristol Education Authority. For services to Art in Education.
- Ian Edgar. For services to the Inland Waterways Protection Society.
- Major Margaret Edmondson. For services to the Soldiers', Sailors' and Airmen's Association in Portsmouth, Hampshire.
- Christine, Mrs. Ellis, Switchboard Operator, Employment Service, Department for Education and Employment.
- Sally Ann, Mrs. Ellison. For services to Worcester Wheels.
- John Alfred Emerson. For services to the Police.
- Gena, Mrs. England, Home Carer. For services to Elderly People.
- James Donald Graham Evans. For services to the community in Wirral, Merseyside.
- Joyce Patricia, Mrs. Glyn-Evans. For services to the British Red Cross Society in Leicestershire.
- Mary Gordon, Mrs. Evans, Cleaner. For services to the National Investigation Office.
- Stanley Evans. For services to the Far East Prisoners of War Association in Lancashire.
- Clive Brazell Evers, chairman, Creutzfeldt-Jakob Disease Support Network. For services to People with CJD and their Families.
- John Samuel Evison. For services to the community in Hazel Grove, Cheshire.
- Sandra Mary, Mrs. Ewen, Community Involvement Manager, H.M. Board of Inland Revenue.
- Philip John Falle, Journalist, Jersey Evening Post. For services to Journalism.
- Musa Moris Farhi, Writer. For services to Literature.
- John Kirtley Fawell, Director, Environment Division, Warren Associates. For services to Drinking Water. *Betty, Mrs. Feasey. For services to the community, especially to the Sherington CE School, in Buckinghamshire.
- Bernard James Feehan, Chief Software Engineer, Thales Aberdeen. For services to Health Care. Avionics Ltd.For services to the Defence Industry.
- Eric Fell, J.P., County Adviser, Community Development in North Yorkshire. For services to Young People and to Scouting.
- Valerie Margaret, Mrs. Felstead. For services to Young People and to Guiding in Barnet, London.
- Patrick Ferrie. For services to Disabled Young People in Motherwell, Lanarkshire.
- Rita Gillian, Mrs. Fickling, Site Agent, Farley Junior School, Luton, Bedfordshire. For services to Education.
- Pamela Jane, Mrs. Fielden, lately Personal Secretary to the Dean of Westminster. For services to the Church of England.
- Betty, Mrs. Fielding. For charitable services to the Children's Society in Bishop's Stortford, Hertfordshire.
- Lilias, Mrs. Finlay. For services to Guiding in Scotland.
- Eric Paul Flavin, Operations Manager, Royal Mail. For services to the community in Birmingham.
- James Eric Fleet. For charitable services to the British Home and Hospital for Long Term Conditions.
- Michael John Flown, Executive Project Manager, Vosper Thornycroft. For services to the Defence and Shipbuilding Industries.
- Jennifer, Mrs. Flynn, chair, Tow Law Town Council, County Durham. For services to the community.
- Bernard William Ford. For services to the Royal Air Forces Association.
- Raymond Henry George Ford, Driver, First Eastern Counties Buses. For services to Trades Unions.
- Madeline, Mrs. Forester. For services to the community, especially the Buckinghamshire Association for the Blind, in Princes Risborough.
- Edmund Joseph Fox, Tutor, Lancashire Governors' Training Programme. For services to Education.
- Jo, Mrs. Fox, Hospital Play Specialist, Great Ormond Street Hospital. For services to Health Care.
- Richard William Francis, Area Manager, Environment Agency. For services to Flood Relief.
- Ronald Antonio Montique Frater, Detective Constable, Northamptonshire Police. For services to the Police.
- Ms Carol Freeman, development director, Sustrans. For services to Cycling.
- Keith John French, Founder, French Brothers. For services to the Passenger Boat Industry.
- Joan Isobel, Mrs. Frondigoun. For services to the Children's Hearings System in Glasgow.
- Susan Margaret Frost, Director, Caledonian Award. For services to Young People with Special Educational Needs.
- William John McCullough Fryer. For services to Local Government.
- Martin Graham Funnell, Temporary Station Officer, West Sussex Fire Brigade. For services to Flood Relief. *Anne Maria, Mrs. Gaffing, Administrative Officer, H.M. Board of Inland Revenue.
- Charanjit, Mrs. Garcha. For services to the Bi-lingual Learners Support Service, Southampton, Hampshire. *Robert Anthony Charles Gardner, Vice President, Exhibitions and Promotions, BAe Systems. For services to the Defence Industry and Aerospace Industries.
- Jane Edith, Mrs. Garrett, lately Senior Executive Officer, Ministry of Agriculture, Fisheries and Food.
- John Gartland. For services to Housing.
- Timothy Gee. For services to the Devas Youth Club in Wandsworth, London.
- Elizabeth, Mrs. Gibb, Co-ordinator, Adoption UK in Scotland. For services to Adoption.
- Ronald Samuel Gilmour, Sector Collections Manager, Post Office. For services to the Royal Mail Community Action Team and to the community in Stirling.
- Nicholas Anthony Gold. For services to the ex-Service community.
- Brendan Gormley. For services to OXFAM.
- Patrick Henry Grattan, Chief Executive and Secretary,Third Age Employment Network. For services to Older Workers and to the New Deal.
- Barry Frank Hebblethwaite Gray, chairman, Bridlington Pier and Harbour Commissioners. For services to the Ports Industry.
- Bryan Mark Gray. For services to Regeneration in Preston, Lancashire.
- Benjamin Green. For services to the community, especially Music, in Tower Hamlets, London.
- Gordon Green, T.D., Hotelier. For services to Tourism in Mid-Wales.
- Kenneth Green. For services to the Sea Cadet Corps in Nottingham.
- David John Greenwood, Headteacher, Sir John Mogg School, Detmold, Ministry of Defence. For services to Children's Education.
- Dorothy, Mrs. Grey, Childminder. For services to Early Years Education in Wandsworth, London.
- Joseph John Glant Griffiths, Wildlife Ranger, Forestry Commission.
- Peter Arnold Griffiths, Divisional Officer, Metropolitan Police Special Constabulary. For services to the Police.
- Laurence St. John Groce, Grade B1, Cabinet Office.
- Lawrence James Grove, lately Crew Member, Horton and Port Eynon Inshore Lifeboat, RNLI. For services to Maritime Safety in Swansea and Gower.
- Maureen, Mrs. Groves. For services to Higher Education.
- Mari Wyn, Mrs. Gruffydd, Director, Carers Outreach, North West Wales. For services to Carers.
- Miss Lizbeth Grundy, Director, Council for Environmental Education. For services to Sustainable Development.
- Ann, Mrs. Guercio, Pay Policy Adviser, H.M. Board of Inland Revenue.
- Edith, Mrs. Hadden. For services to the British Red Cross Society.
- Flora Margaret, Mrs. Hamilton. For services to the West Coast Disabled Club, Saltcoats, Ayrshire.
- Joyce, Mrs. Hannigan, Planning and Communication Assistant, Lord Chancellor's Department.
- Roger Robert Reeves Hansford. For services to the community, especially Young People, in Ipswich, Suffolk.
- Joan Enid, Mrs. Hardcastle. For services to the WRVS in Wolverhampton and Preston, Lancashire.
- Paul Thomas Grant Harding. For services to Biological Recording.
- David Dudley Hardy, Head, Messenger Service, Driver and Vehicle Licensing Agency, Department of the Environment, Transport and the Regions.
- Sophia Raphael, Mrs. Harkness, Teacher, Penpont Primary School, Dumfriesshire. For services to Education.
- Derek George Harrington, Leader, West Bromwich Boys' Club, West Midlands. For services to Young People.
- Linda Mary, Mrs. Harris, Nursery Nurse, Three Crowns Community Special School, Walsall. For services to Children with Special Educational Needs.
- Ms Rossina Harris, Lecturer, Lewisham College, London. For services to the Trades Union Congress.
- Colin Harrison, Administrative Officer, Department of Social Security.
- Michael Derek Hartley, Project Leader, BAe Systems. For services to the Defence Industry.
- Thomas William Hartley, Farm Worker. For services to Agriculture in Nottinghamshire.
- Philip Ernest Harvey. Brigade Engineer and Retained Sub Officer, Hereford and Worcester Fire Brigade. For services to Flood Relief.
- Derek Hastings, lately Principal Officer, H.M. Prison Lewes, H.M. Prison Service, Home Office.
- Carol Ann, Mrs. Heard, Senior Personal Secretary, Department of Health.
- Michael John Heath. Cartoonist, The Spectator. For services to Journalism.
- Stephen Leslie Heathcote. For services to the community, especially Young People, in Armitage, Staffordshire.
- Andrew Kerr Henderson, Consultant, Oban. For services to Medicine.
- Iona, Mrs. Henderson. For services to Munlochy Animal Aid, Black Isle, Ross-shire
- Raymond Heppell. For services to People with Autism in Cambridgeshire.
- William David Reginald Herbert. For services to Local Government and to the community in Beaufort, South Wales.
- Martin Robert Ward Hewlett. For services to the community, especially the Administration of Justice, in Jersey.
- Veronica Regina, Mrs. Hicks. Grade C2, Ministry of Defence.
- David High, Founder, Environmental Press Agency. For services to the Environment and to Journalism.
- Clarice Ann, Mrs. Hill, Caretaker, North Hykeham All Saints CE Primary School, Lincoln. For services to Education.
- Ms Julie Elizabeth Hill, Programme Adviser, Green Alliance. For services to Environmental Protection.
- John Stuart Hills, lately Member, OFWAT Thames Customer Service Committee. For services to Water Consumers.
- Harold Patrick Hodgetts, Member, Lichfield Rural District Council. For services to the community.
- Alice, Mrs. Hogg, Deputy Matron, Hawkhill House Nursing Home, Aberdeen. For services to Geriatric Nursing.
- Dorothy Hogg, Jewellery Designer/Maker and Teacher. For services to Jewellery and Silversmithing.
- Brian Holliday, Leading Hand, Assembly Department, Remploy, Blackburn. For services to the Employment of Disabled People.
- Norman Holliday, Prison Service Governor Grade 2, H.M. Prison Manchester, H.M. Prison Service, Home Office.
- David John Holmes, Warden, Riverside Youth Centre, Oxford. For services to Young People.
- Jennifer, Mrs. Holmes. For services to Health Care. Brian William H, lately Grade E1, Ministry of Defence.
- Peter Stephen William Horne, lately Senior Presenting Officer, Immigration and Nationality Directorate, Home Office.
- Barbara Jennifer, Mrs. Horner. For services to Young People in Market Drayton, Shropshire.
- Michael William Horner, managing director, Bullen and Partners. For services to Flood Defence.
- Beulah Elizabeth, Mrs. Irwin-Houston, Revenue Assistant, H.M. Board of Inland Revenue.
- Ms Carole Anne Howells. For services to the Newcastle Council for Voluntary Service.
- Donald Delbert Howlett. For services to the Community in Liskeard, Cornwall.
- Rodney John Huddleston, Consultant, RJH Associates. For services to the Use of Explosives in the Quarrying Industry.
- Evan Richard Hughes, Constable, North Wales Police.vFor services to the Police and to the community in Llandudno.
- Hugh Hughes. For services to the community, especially Music, in Llandudno, North Wales.
- Miss Rhiannon Wyn Hughes. For services to the community in Denbighshire.
- Stephen Owen-Hughes, lately Fire Service Divisional Officer, Defence Fire Service, Ministry of Defence.
- William Francis Pennyman Hugonin, T.D., D.L. For services to Community Arts in Northumberland.
- Stewart Hazlitt Hulse. For services to Mountain Rescue in the Lake District.
- Sandy Lewis Hulstone, Community Volunteer Fund Raiser, Staffordshire Police. For services to the community in Bradwell.
- Norman David Hummerstone. For services to the community, especially the Little Ship Club, in the City of London.
- David Ian Humphries. Grade C, Department for Culture, Media and Sport.
- Mary, Mrs. Hunt, Senior Food and Beverage Supervisor, Gloucestershire Royal NHS Trust. For services to the NHS.
- Margaret Mary, Mrs. Hunter, Secretary, Diabetes UK in Gateshead. For services to People with Diabetes.
- Lynne Patricia, Mrs. Hutchinson, Co-ordinator, Barnardos. For services to Young People.
- James Irwin. For services to Allied Distillers Company and to the community in Dumbarton.
- David Leighton James. For services to Business and to the community in Ynysybwl, Rhondda Cynon Taff.
- Ralph James. For services to the community in Lichfield, Staffordshire.
- Annie Mary Beatrice, Mrs. Jamison. For charitable services to Hearing Dogs for Deaf People.
- Christine, Mrs. Janes. For services to Lawn Tennis.
- Loretta Jennings, Honorary Legal Adviser, Association of London Government. For services to Local Government.
- Allan Derek Johnson, lately Grade C1, Ministry of Defence.
- Frederick Johnson, Customer Liaison Manager, BHW Components. For services to the Aerospace Industry.
- Jean Hutchison, Mrs. Johnson. For services to the community in Maidenhead, Berkshire.
- Elisabeth, Lady Joicey. For services to the community, especially Equestrian Sport, in Northumberland.
- Basil Joseph Jones, Driving Instructor, British School of Motoring. For services to Mobility for Disabled People, in Surrey.
- Camilla, Mrs. Whitworth-Jones, Arts Manager, Paul Hamlyn Foundation. For services to the Arts.
- Dyfanwen, Mrs. Jones, Macmillan Nurse. For services to Nursing and Cancer Care in Powys.
- Enid, Mrs. Jones, Governor, Wigan and Leigh College. For services to Further Education and to the community.
- Iorwerth Watkin Jones. For services to the Industrial Railway Museum, Penrhyn Castle, Gwynedd.
- John Gareth Jones, Director, Wessex Water Services. For services to the Water Industry and to Environmental Quality.
- John Ivor Jones, Paramedic, Welsh Ambulance Services NHS Trust. For services to Health Care.
- Patrick Jordan. For services to Young People.
- Michael Judge, lately Crew Member, Whitstable Inshore Lifeboat, RNLI. For services to Marine Safety in Kent.
- Ajit Singh Kalirai. For services to Athletics.
- Joan, Mrs. Kearsley. For services to the community in Coverack, Helston, Cornwall.
- Jacqueline Rosemary, Mrs. Keen. For services to the Police Community Partnership Group in Haslemere, Surrey.
- Jenny Joan, Mrs. Kellaway, Governor, Poole High School, Dorset. For services to Education.
- Jean, Mrs. Kelly. For services to Community Relations.
- Marjorie Noreen, Mrs. Kelly. For services to the community in Wombourne, Staffordshire.
- Peter Wentworth Kendall. For services to the Royal British Legion in Penzance, Cornwall.
- Christopher Edmund Kenward, Grade C2, Defence Evaluation and Research Agency, Ministry of Defence.
- John George Keylock, Founder Member, Somerset Wildlife Trust. For services to Nature Conservation.
- Salim Ismail Kholwadia, Administrative Support, H.M. Board of Customs and Excise.
- Lorna, Mrs. Kilpatrick, lately Senior Welfare Officer, Department for International Development.
- Miss Mary Winifred King. For services to the community in Bath, Somerset.
- Ms Rani King, Information Officer, Department for Education and Employment.
- Wendy Patricia, Mrs. Kirkpatrick. For services to the community, especially Young People, in Carlisle, Cumbria.
- Phyllis, Mrs. Knox, Matron, Abbeyfield Residential Home, Ballachulish, Inverness-shire. For services to the community.
- Davina, Mrs. Laird, lately Domestic Cleaner, Western General Hospital, Edinburgh. For services to Health Care.
- Miss Joyce Lambert Home Carer. For services to Elderly People in Greenwich, London.
- Renee, Mrs. Lancaster. For services to the community in Baildon Green, West Yorkshire.
- Nicholas Edward Lane, Administrative Officer, Benefits Agency, Department of Social Security.
- Gladys Hariett, Mrs. Latimer. For public service.
- Suzanne Elizabeth, Mrs. Launchbury, Mid-day Supervisor, Brooke Special School, Rugby, Warwickshire. For services to Children with Special Educational Needs.
- Iola, Mrs. Leach. For services to the community in Lincolnshire and Nottinghamshire.
- Alan Lee, Crematorium Manager, Corporation of the City of London. For services to the community in East London.
- Miss Angela Joyce Lee, Director, Bicycle Helmet Initiative. For services to Road Safety.
- Brian Charles Lee, Assistant Printing and Stationery Manager. For services to the Corporation of the City of London.
- Carol Alice, Mrs. Lee. For services to the Learning Disability Advisory Group.
- Selina Yuet Kwan, Mrs. Lee. For services to the Chinese Community.
- Rosalie Judith, Mrs. Lees. For services to Blind Students in Africa (Blindaid Africa).
- Raymond Hugh Leigh. For services to Furniture Design.
- William Reginald Albert Lennard. For services to the Finsbury Rifles Old Comrades Association.
- Eileen Edith, Mrs. Lewenstein, Ceramist. For services to Art.
- Helen, Mrs. Lewis, Choreographer and Teacher. For services to Contemporary Dance.
- Stuart Harvey Lock, lately Grade C1, Ship Support Agency, Ministry of Defence.
- Alan Frederick Long, Goods Vehicle Testing Station Manager, Vehicle Inspectorate, Department of the Environment, Transport and the Regions.
- John Douglas Longstaff, Higher Executive Officer, Department of Social Security.
- Peter Renshaw Lowndes, General Dental Practitioner, Birmingham. For services to the Dental Profession. *Ronald Richard Lusty. For services to the Sea Cadet Corps in Ealing, London.
- Miss Elizabeth Anne Mabley, Community Development Group Leader, Sandwell Metropolitan Borough Council. For services to Community Development.
- Miss Ellen Patricia MacArthur. For services to Sailing.
- James Grant MacDonald, Director of Lifelong Learning, University of Glasgow. For services to Adult Education.
- John MacAulay MacDonald. For services to Crofting and to the community in North Uist, Western Scotland.
- Miss Margaret MacDonald. For services to the community in the Kyle of Sutherland.
- Janet, Mrs. MacGregor. For services to the community in Killin, Perthshire.
- Duncan MacInnes. For services to the community in Motherwell, Lanarkshire.
- Duncan MacInnes, J.P., Fisherman. For services to the Scottish Fishing Industry.
- George Richard MacKay. Potato Breeder, Scottish Crop Research Institute. For services to Plant Breeding.
- James Ross MacKay. For services to Conservation to the Bennachie Mountain Range, Aberdeenshire.
- Irene Mary, Mrs. MacKenzie. For services to the WRVS in Edinburgh.
- Ian Kenneth MacLeod, Dental (Maxillofacial) Technician. For services to Dental Care.
- Miss Theodosia Margaret Maddison. For services to the community in Partney, Lincolnshire.
- Brian Lynn Maguire. For services to the Police.
- Denis William Manners. For services to the community through Morris Dancing in Oxfordshire.
- The Reverend John Anthony Stacy-Marks, Director, Amelia Methodist Trust Farm. For services to Young People in South Wales.
- Jonathan Robert Marsh, lately Head, Engineering Department, National Institute for Medical Research. For services to the Medical Research Council.
- John Edward Martin. For services to the Peterborough Cathedral Development and Preservation Trust.
- Gloria Lorraine, Mrs. Mason, Training Administrator, Lord Chancellor's Department.
- John Thaw Mathers, Group Scout Leader, 1st Cheadle Bethesda Special Needs Group, Cheshire. For services to Scouting.
- Muriel, Mrs. Mathers. For services to SENSE, The National Deafblind and Rubella Association.
- Elizabeth Marion, Mrs. May. For services to the Trade Union Movement.
- Alan Connely MAleese. For public service.
- Miss Elizabeth MAughtry. For charitable services.
- Harry MCommon. For services to Young People.
- David Arthur MCarthy. For services to Canal Restoration and to the Environment in North West England.
- John Alexander MCook, J.P. For services to the community in Nethy Bridge, Badenoch and Strathspey, Inverness-shire.
- Nan, Mrs. MCook, Foster Parent. For services to Fostering .
- Norman MCorkell. For services to Prisoner Welfare.
- William Charles MFarland. For services to Young People.
- Margaret, Mrs. MGimpsey, Foster Parent. For services to Fostering.
- June Elizabeth Alexander, Mrs. MGregor, Principal Development Officer, Higher Still. For services to Music Education in Scotland.
- John William MHale, Bailiff Manager, Court Service, Lord Chancellor's Department.
- James Dron MLead, Band Leader. For charitable services.
- Bernard MMahon. For services to the Bosnian Support Fund.
- George MMillan, J.P. For services to the community in Campbeltown, Argyll and Bute.
- Hamilton Coates MMillan, Hotel Owner. For services to Tourism in South West Scotland.
- Prince Albert MNicholls. For services to Community Relations in Aylesbury, Buckinghamshire.
- Esther, Mrs. Agyei-Mensah, Administrative Officer, Department of the Environment, Transport and the Regions.
- Christopher Henry Rowland Meredith. For charitable services to the community in Milton Keynes.
- Peter Richard Mereweather. For services to the Hotel and Catering Benevolent Association and to Tourism in London.
- Philip Meericks. For services to Conservation in Agriculture.
- Edward Arthur Tweedy Milburn, engineering director, Arriva London. For services to the Bus Industry.
- David John Miller. For services to the community in Orwell, Cambridgeshire.
- Trevor Milton, Canteen Manager, HMS Ocean. For services to the Navy, Army and Air Force Institutes.
- John Keith Moger. For services to the NHS in Wales.
- Mohammed Monir. For services to the community in Rotherham, South Yorkshire.
- Doris Nanette, Mrs. Moody. For services to the community, especially Disabled People, in Chadsmoor Cannock, Staffordshire.
- Jennifer Mary, Mrs. Moody. For services to the Victims of Domestic Violence in Luton, Bedfordshire.
- Brenda, Mrs. Moore. For charitable services to the Royal Marsden Hospital, London.
- Justin Moore, J.P. For services to the community, especially the Greenlight Youth Project, in Tower Hamlets, London.
- Miss Alison Jean Morgan, Senior Manager, Morecambe Bay Primary Care Team. For services to Health Care. *Michael John Morgan, lately Deputy Officer in Charge, H.M. Board of Inland Revenue.
- Pamela Jean, Mrs. Morgan, Community Nursing Sister, Morlais Medical Practice. For services to the community in Merthyr Tydfil, South Wales.
- Charles Thomas Reginald Mortimore. For services to Sport for Young People.
- William Sinclair Mowatt, Farrier and Blacksmith. For services to the Heritage of South Ronaldsay, Orkney. *Miss Molly Muckelt. For services to the community in Ulverston, Cumbria.
- Dennis Murphy. For services to the community, especially Young People, in Lochgilphead, Argyll.
- Helen Gentles, Mrs. Murray, J.P. For services to the Justice System in Scotland.
- Robert Murray. For services to the St. John Ambulance Brigade.
- Eunice, Mrs. Myers, Teacher, High Down Infant School, Portishead, Bristol. For services to Education.
- Philip Charles Nathan. For services to the International Association of Lions Clubs.
- Anne, Mrs. Neame. For services to the Soldiers', Sailors' and Airmen's Families Association in Kent.
- Barbara, Mrs. Needham. For services to the Display Technology Alliance.
- Brian Frederick Nellist, Honorary Senior Fellow, Department of English Language and Literature, University of Liverpool. For services to English Language and Literature.
- Joseph Anthony Newman. For charitable services in London.
- Miss Margaret Anne Newsholme, Accident and Emergency Sister, Bradford Royal Infirmary. For services to Nursing.
- Diane, Mrs. Nightingale, Leader, Postellers Youth Hostels Association Group. For services to Disadvantaged Young People.
- Alexa, Mrs. Nisbet. For services to North East Animal Rescue, Northumberland.
- Jeanette Begg, Mrs. Niven. For services to the Wates Foundation.
- Miss Chi-chi Nwanoku. Double bass player. For services to music.
- Conor O'Cleary. For services to Public Transport.
- Geoffrey Oldfield. For services to Heritage in Nottinghamshire.
- Ann, Mrs. Ovenstone, Director, International Tortoise Association. For services to Chelonia.
- Pamela Ann, Mrs. Packer, Personal Secretary, H.M. Board of Inland Revenue.
- Catherine Anne Page. For services to Trampolining in North West England.
- Stephen Paget. For services to Disabled People and to the National Lotteries Charities Board in South West England.
- Christine Frances Hyde, Mrs. Pardoe. For services to the League of Friends of Hawkhurst Cottage Hospital, Kent.
- Deborah Lyn, Mrs. Parry. For services to Energy Consumers in Yorkshire.
- Joan Valerie, Mrs. Payne. For services to the community in Bromley, Kent.
- Barbara Valerie, Mrs. Peacock, Head, Ashlyns Pregnant Schoolgirl Unit, Newcastle-upon-Tyne. For services to Health and Education.
- Margaret, Mrs. Pearson, School and Clinic Nurse. For services to Health Care for Young People in Sandwell, West Midlands.
- Peter Pendlington, Higher Executive Officer, Child Benefit Agency, Department of Social Security.
- Joanna Jane, Mrs. Peppiatt. For charitable services, through Turville Books, in Oxfordshire.
- Anne Elizabeth, Mrs. Perchard. For services to Jersey Cattle.
- Janet Sandra, Mrs. Petts. For charitable services to Bassetlaw Hospital and Community Services NHS Trust, Nottinghamshire.
- Graham Robert Pilkington, Northern Operations Manager, Wastewater. For services to Regeneration.
- Eileen Mary, Mrs. Pinder. For services to the community in Evesham, Worcestershire.
- Miss Nicola Ponsford. For services to Women's Rugby Union Football.
- Robert William Frederick Poole, Columnist and Author. For services to Journalism and to Rural Affairs.
- James Colin Porteous. For services to the community, especially Disabled People, in York.
- John Rennie Porteous. For services to the Board of Visitors' National Advisory Council.
- Mavis Maureen, Mrs. Porter, lately Range B, H.M.Treasury.
- Rhodri John Powell. For charitable services to the community in South Wales.
- Annie Muriel, Mrs. Pritchard. For services to the community in Bangor, Gwynedd.
- Alison Gail Ramsay. For services to Hockey.
- Brian Anthony Ramsay, Resident Manager, Millington Court, Uckfield. For services during Floods.
- Derek Charles Randall. For charitable services in Kent.
- John Alexander Rankin. For services to Local Government.
- Christine, Mrs. Rapley, Personal Assistant to the Head of School, Lambeth College, London. For services to the Cotswold Trust.
- John Norman Stickland Rayner. For services to the Wiltshire Wildlife Conservation Volunteers.
- Margaret Eleanor, Mrs. Read. For services to the community in Penarth, Vale of Glamorgan.
- Timothy Reddish. For services to Disabled Sport.
- David Reid, lately Head Janitor, Banff and Buchan College. For services to Education.
- Elizabeth Mary, Mrs. Cornelius-Reid. For services to Health Care.
- Frances Louie, Mrs. Reid. For services to Tourism.
- Derrick James Rex. For services to the community in Cwmbran.
- Hubert Rhodes. For services to the War Pensions Committee in West Yorkshire.
- Ronald Leslie Rhymer, J.P. For services to the St John Ambulance Brigade in Romsey, Hampshire.
- Miss Jennifer Alison Richardson, Kitchen Administrator, Whitbreads. For services to the Brewing Industry.
- Catherine Mary, Mrs. Riddell. For services to the community in Measham, Leicestershire.
- Joanne, Mrs. Riden. For services to the League of Friends of Chase Farm and Cheshunt Hospitals, Hertfordshire.
- Irene Hannah, Mrs. Ringer, J.P. For services to the Administration of Justice in Norfolk.
- Marilyn, Mrs. Roberts. For services to Local Government and to the community in Llanfaes and Powys.
- Malcolm Ellis Robertson, Production Services Manager, South East Water. For services to the Water Industry.
- Robert Rodgers. For services to Game Angling.
- Enid Marion Lee, Mrs. Rogan. For services to the Community.
- Michael Roleston. For services to Health and Safety in the Shipbuilding Industry.
- Rosemary Ann, Mrs. Rose, lately Grade E1, Defence Logistics Organisation, Ministry of Defence.
- Marilyn, Mrs. Ross. For services to Women's Aid in Ross-shire.
- Susan Joyce, Mrs. Rossington, lately Training Support Unit Manager, Lincolnshire TEC. For services to Training.
- Donald Rousell, lately Grade C1, Ministry of Defence.
- Ernest Edward Royle. For services to the Cheddleton Flint Mill Museum and the Stoke-on-Trent Archaeological Society, Staffordshire.
- Michael Gilbert Ruffles, Senior Probation Officer. For services to the Community Service Scheme and the Assessment and Treatment Drug Programme in Devon.
- Ms Judith Russell. For services to Disabled Sport.
- David Russon, J.P., Teacher, Ridgewood High School, Stourbridge, West Midlands. For services to Education.
- Andrew Cummings Rutter. For services to the Harwich Society in Essex.
- Elizabeth Anne, Mrs. Ryan, lately Chair of Governors, Honley High School, Huddersfield, West Yorkshire. For services to Education.
- Lesley, Mrs. Ryan, Learning Support Assistant, Green Hedges School, Cambridge. For services to Children with Special Educational Needs.
- David Clement George Ryding, Quality Engineer, Marshall Aerospace. For services to the Defence and Aerospace Industries.
- Miss Joyce Ryley, chairperson, Royal Opera House Benevolent Fund. For services to Music.
- Alan Daniel Salmon. For services to the community in Wisbech, Cambridgeshire.
- Catherine, Mrs. Sampson, lately Cleaning Supervisor, College of West Anglia, Norfolk. For services to Further Education.
- Malcolm John Sanders, Refit Production Manager, Devonport Management Ltd. For services to the Defence Industry.
- John Gilbert Sanderson. For services to the community in Rowhedge and Colchester, Essex.
- Sarjit Sangha, Co-ordinator, Gravesend Town Centre Initiative. For services to the community.
- Richard Charles Saunders. For services to the Babraham Institute.
- Sylvia, Mrs. Saunders, General Manager, International Power Presses. For services to Export.
- Alexander Scott. For services to Blind and Visually Impaired People in Scotland.
- Miss Maureen Easton Scott, General Medical Practitioner, Troon. For services to Health Care.
- Alan Kenneth Scriven, Skipper, Long Mynd Adventure Camp. For services to Disadvantaged Young People.
- Judith Mary, Mrs. Sefton. For services to the community, especially Disabled People, in Cheshire.
- Gordon Sharp. For services to Police Driver Training.
- Charles Shepherd, lately Water Manager, Grampian and Tayside, North of Scotland Water Authority. For services to the Water Industry.
- Doreen, Mrs. Shufflebottom, J.P. For services to the community, especially the Douglas Macmillan Hospice, in Blurton, Staffordshire.
- Terence John Simco. For services to the Queen Victoria Seamen's Rest.
- Miss Kelly Simmons, Head, National Football Development, Football Association. For services to Association Football.
- Jean Veronica Ann, Mrs. Skinner, Senior Personal Secretary, Department for Education and Employment.
- Peter Skivington. For services to Disabled People in Carmarthenshire.
- Andrew MFarlane-Slack. For services to the community, especially Housing, in Lochaber, Inverness-shire.
- Colin Stuart Slater. For services to the community in Nottingham.
- John Humphry Sleight. For services to Accident Prevention in the Avon area.
- Elizabeth Dorothy Anne, Mrs. MCall-Smith. For services to the Mental Welfare Commission for Scotland.
- Frank Anthony Smith, Administrative Officer, Child Support Agency, Department of Social Security.
- Miss Helen Margaret Smith, Business Improvement Manager, H.M. Board of Customs and Excise.
- Peter Smith, Special Constable, Lincolnshire Police. For services to the Police.
- Mohan Sokhal, J.P., Bus Operator/Driver, First Huddersfield Bus Company. For services to the Bus Industry and to the community in Huddersfield, West Yorkshire.
- Robert Somerville, lately Factory Trade Union Convener, Rolls Royce Aero Engine Services Ltd. For services to Industrial Relations.
- The Reverend Canon Peter Clive Southerton. For charitable services to the community in Denbighshire.
- Colin William Sparks, Head, Corporate Development, National Crime Squad. For services to the Police.
- Renee Hannah, Mrs. Spector, chair, West Midlands Special Needs Transport Ltd. For services to Accessible Public Transport.
- William Sydney Spicknell, Sub-Officer (Retained), Leicestershire Fire and Rescue Service. For services to the Fire Service.
- Veronica, Mrs. Stancer, Member, Consumer Panel, Housing Corporation. For services to Tenants and Disadvantaged Communities.
- Miss Maria St. Denys, chairman, Legato. For services to Children with Special Needs.
- Ann, Mrs. Bonner-Steel. For services to the Christian Education Movement Wales.
- Miss Jennifer Stephenson. For services to the Family Holiday Association.
- Rosemary, Mrs. Stephenson, executive director, Patient Services, Northumbria Healthcare NHS Trust. For services to Nursing.
- David Cameron Morton Stibbles. For services to the Duke of Edinburgh Award in Dundee.
- John Richard Stone, Principal Building Surveyor, House of Commons.
- Shirley Kate, Mrs. Strong. For services to the community, especially Guiding and the Society for Libyan Studies in London.
- Sigrid Gerda Lieschen Inge, Mrs. Sturgeon, Unit Manager, Lease Hill Home for Older People, Swindon, Wiltshire. For services to Elderly People.
- Barbara, Mrs. Summons. For services to the community in Rosemarket, West Wales.
- Barbara, Mrs. Takyar, Governor, Addington School, Woodley, Reading, Berkshire. For services to Children with Special Educational Needs.
- Eileen, Mrs. Taplin. For services to the Bury and District Disabled Advisory Council.
- Jeremy Taylor, Head of Religious Education, Oakmeeds Community College, Burgess Hill, West Sussex. For services to Education.
- John Taylor, chair, National Framework Management Committee, Meat Training Council. For services to Training.
- Paul Tear. For services to the Wallace Collection's Centenary Project.
- John Henry Theaker. For services to Scottish Natural Heritage.
- David William Thomas. For services to Disabled People in Swansea, South Wales.
- Miss Gaynor Elaine Thomas, Higher Executive Officer, National Assembly for Wales.
- Hazel, Mrs. Thomas. For services to Elderly Mentally Ill People in Watford, Hertfordshire.
- Margaret Elizabeth, Mrs. Thomas, School Crossing Patrol, Bristol City Council. For services to Road Safety.
- David Neville Thompson, Disability Services Adviser, Warrington Community Health Care Trust. For services to People with Disabilities.
- George King Thompson. For services to Housing.
- Sandra, Mrs. Thompson, Dog Warden. For services to Animal Welfare in Caerphilly, Wales.
- Jill, Mrs. Thomson. For services to the Cancer Research Campaign in Falkirk.
- Patrick John Timoney, Q.P.M. For services to the Police.
- James Johnston Todd. For services to Veteran Athletics.
- Cecil Tripp. For services to the community, especially Flood Defence, in Somerset.
- Ronnie George Trouton. For services to Road Safety.
- George Charles Turner. For services to Meteorology in Berkshire.
- James William Vaughan, Senior Teacher, Toynbee School, Eastleigh, Hampshire. For services to Education and to the community.
- Patricia, Mrs. Vizard. For services to Museums.
- Catherine, Mrs. Waithe, Adviser, Ethnic Minority Issues, University for the West of England. For services to Higher Education.
- Brian Walker, Founder, Walker Filtration. For services to International Trade.
- George Walker. For services to the North East Promenaders Against Cancer, Newcastle-upon-Tyne.
- John Walker, Secretary and Treasurer, Bootle Village Pipe Band. For services to Music in Liverpool.
- Barbara Georgina, Mrs. Walmsley. For services to the community in Cookham, Berkshire.
- Antony Leslie Ward, chairman, Suffolk Association of Local Councils. For services to the community.
- Thomas Stark McMorran Ward. For services to Archaeology in Lanarkshire.
- May, Mrs. Warren. For services to Barnet Hospital, London.
- Richard Warren, Chief Geologist, Amerada Hess. For services to the Oil and Gas Industry.
- Nell, Mrs. Wassell. For services to the community in Barlanark, Glasgow.
- Alexander Hepburn Watson. For services to Conservation in Bennachie, Aberdeenshire.
- Squadron Leader Edward Philip Weatherhead. For services to the Highland Reserve Forces and Cadets Association.
- Rita, Mrs. Weaver, Executive Officer, Benefits Agency, Department of Social Security.
- Brian John Frederick Webb, Resident Lock and Weir Keeper, Hurley Lock, Environment Agency. For services to the Water Services Industry.
- Sydney Edward Webb. For services to the British Korean Veterans' Association in Southend, Essex.
- Graham Thomas Webster, Resident Director, Thales. For services to the Defence Industry.
- Miss Ann Patricia Weir. For services to the community in Salford, Greater Manchester.
- John Glendinning Weir. For services to Business.
- Alan Welch. For services to LabAid.
- Patricia Forrest, Mrs. West, lately Head, Records Review, Department of Trade and Industry.
- Shaheen Choudhury, Mrs. Westcombe. For services to Community Relations.
- Shirley, Mrs. Westwood, Teacher, Helenswood School, Hastings, East Sussex. For services to Education.
- Francis Wheeler. For services to Public Transport Pensioners.
- Robert White, Senior Technician, Northbrook College, West Sussex. For services to Further Education.
- Karen Ann, Mrs. Whitehead. For services to the Oil and Gas Industry.
- Douglas Donald Whitlam, Capacity Owner, Rolls Royce plc. For services to the Aerospace Industry.
- Mary Christine, Mrs. Whyham, Assistant Chief Probation Officer, Lancashire Probation Service. For services to the Probation Service.
- Derek Thurston Wild, Regional Engineering Support Manager, Yorkshire Water. For services to Flood Relief.
- Alexa Curle, Mrs. Wilkinson, lately Operations Manager, Milton Keynes and North Buckinghamshire TEC. For services to Training.
- Averil, Mrs. Wilkinson, Senior Teacher and Head, Expressive Arts Department, John Colet School, Wendover, Buckinghamshire. For services to Education.
- Betty Patricia, Mrs. Williams, Member, Gawsworth Parish Council, Cheshire. For services to the community.
- Estelle Theodora, Mrs. Williams, Nurse, Wycombe Hospital, Buckinghamshire. For services to the community in High Wycombe.
- Judith Ann, Mrs. Williams, Wales Deputy Director Support, Employment Service, Department for Education and Employment.
- Mary, Mrs. Williams, Welfare Officer, BAe Systems. For services to the Defence Industry.
- Michael Ingouville Williams. For services to Agriculture, Biodiversity and to the Environment in East Lothian.
- Miss Patricia Williams, Headteacher, Kitchener Primary School, Cardiff. For services to Education.
- William Joseph Wilson, Director, Bob Wilson Funfairs Ltd. For charitable services.
- Miss Patricia Winter. For services to the Cats Protection League in Croydon, Surrey.
- Lily, Mrs. Wood, Senior Community Librarian, West Cumbria. For services to Librarianship.
- Lieutenant Colonel (Retired) Alan Adrian Edward Woodford. For services to the British Red Cross Society, especially Flood Relief, in Devon.
- Janet Denise, Mrs. Woods, Senior Probation Officer, H.M. Young Offenders' Institution Thorn Cross. For services to the Probation and Prison services.
- Duncan James Woolard, Member, Spalding and District Access Group, Lincolnshire. For services to People with Disabilities and to the community.
- John Wyndham. For services to the Royal British Legion Youth Band in Brentwood, Essex.
- Carl Peter Francis Andrew York. For services to the Tonbridge Civic Society, Kent.
- Mary May, Mrs. Young, Personal Secretary, Polmont Young Offenders' Institution, Scottish Executive.
- Sheila, Mrs. Young. For services to the Citizens Advice Bureau in Malvern, Worcestershire.
- Konrad Zimand, Interpreter. For services to the Southern Derbyshire Acute Hospitals NHS Trust.
- Arnold Walter Zimmerman, Tutor and Principal, Summer Schools, Education Development Association. For services to Education.

== The Commonwealth ==
=== Bahamas ===
==== Order Of St Michael And St George ====
===== Knight Commander (K.C.M.G.) =====
- Arthur Alexander Foulkes. For services to politics, diplomacy and journalism.

===== Companions of the St Michael and St George (C.M.G.) =====
- Wendell Godfrey Major. For public service.
- Norman Solomon. For service to the business community.

==== Order of the British Empire ====
===== Commander of the Order of the British Empire (C.B.E.) =====
- Senator The Honourable Lynn Holowesko. For services to the law and the environment.

===== Officers of the Order of the British Empire (O.B.E.) =====
- Bishop Roston Livingston Davis. For service to religion and the community.
- Arnold Robinson (Jack) Knowles. For service to the insurance industry.
- George James Mosko. For service to the construction industry.
- The Reverend Charles Andrew Sweeting. For service to religion and the community.

===== Members of the Order of the British Empire (M.B.E.) =====
- Paula, Mrs. Poitier-Darcy. For services to education.
- Violet, Mrs. Esfakis. For service to the community.
- Ruth Agnes, Mrs. Granger. For services to education.
- Naomi Amelia, Mrs. Lockhart. For services to education.
- Dr. Mary Priscilla Ritchie. For services to health.
- William Weeks. For services to the community.
- Hubert Wong. For services to business.

==== British Empire Medal (B.E.M.) ====
- Patrick Gomez, J.P. For services to tourism and public transport.
- Dr. Corolyn Leona Hanna. For services to education.
- Willis Lindberg Harding. For service to the community.
- Walter Otnell Laing. For service to the hospitality industry.
- William Earl Lightbourne. For services to education.
- Eldica Theresa, Mrs. Moss. For service to the community.
- Ms Edith Christine Rolle. For public service.
- Anderson Stuart Stratton. For service to the community

==== Queen's Police Medal (Q.P.M.) ====
- Reginald Ferguson, Royal Bahamas Police Force.
- John Sidney Rolle, Royal Bahamas Police Force.

=== Barbados ===
==== Order Of The British Empire ====
===== Commander of the Order of the British Empire (C.B.E.) =====
- The Reverend William George Dixon. For services to religion.

===== Officer of the Order of the British Empire (O.B.E.) =====
- Woodbine Augustus Davis, Q.C., J.P. For services to the law.

===== Members of the Order of the British Empire (M.B.E.) =====
- Miss Eugene Aquinda Daniel. For services to St. John Ambulance Brigade.

=== Belize ===
==== Member of the Order of the British Empire (M.B.E.) ====
- Jose Asevedo. For services to education.

=== Grenada ===
==== Order Of The British Empire ====
===== Commander of the Order of the British Empire (C.B.E.) =====
- Sister Gabrielle Mason. For services to education.

===== Member of the Order of the British Empire (M.B.E.) =====
- Hudson James McPhail. For services to education.

==== British Empire Medal (B.E.M.) ====
- Lennard Augustine. For services to the fishing industry.
- Thomas Benjamin. For services to the farming industry.
- Paul McIntosh. For services to the farming industry.
- James Sylvester. For services to the farming industry.

=== Papua New Guinea ===
==== Order of St Michael and St George ====
===== Companions of the Order of St Michael and St George (C.M.G.) =====
- The Honourable Michael Ogio, C.B.E., M.P. For services to politics.
- The Right Reverend Albert Toburua, O.B.E. For services to the church and community.

==== Order of the British Empire ====
===== Knight Commander of the Order of the British Empire (K.B.E.) =====
- James Murdo Fraser. For public service..

===== Commanders of the Order of the British Empire (C.B.E.) =====
- Beno Bartholomew Tomon Boeha. For services to higher education and research.
- John Luke Crittin. For services to business and the community.
- Leo Meninga. For public service.

===== Officers of the Order of the British Empire (O.B.E.) =====
- Benson Gegeyo. For Public service.
- Councillor Nambuka Mara. For service to the community.
- Bishop Laka Renagi. For service to the church and community.
- Dennis Renton. For public service.
- Justice Gibbs Salika. For service to the judiciary.
- Henry Hung Tse. For service to business and the community.

===== Members of the Order of the British Empire (M.B.E.) =====
- Joseph Diunde Kama. For service to the community.
- Valentine Kambori. For service to agriculture.
- George Karaliyo. For service to the community.
- Clarence Kewani. For public service.
- Ms Margaret Lavutul. For services to women's affairs and the community.
- Minty, Mrs. Mae. For services to the judiciary.
- Damien Miti. For services to sport and education.
- Benny Borrom Popoital. For services to banking.
- John Elipa Pun. For services to politics.
- Mathew Numambo Siune. For services to politics.
- David Sode. For public service.
- Peter Dalton Woolcott. For service to business.
- Sydney George Yates. For services to sports and business.

===== Members of the Order of the British Empire (Military) (M.B.E.) =====
- Lieutenant Colonel David Johnny, Papua New Guinea Defence Force.
- Lieutenant Colonel Daniel Kipo, Papua New Guinea Defence Force.

==== British Empire Medal (B.E.M) ====
- Goodwill Tony Amos. For services to forestry.
- Councillor Jack Hole Angual. For service to the community.
- John Banama. For public service.
- Pastor Sepo Koti. For service to the church and community.
- Kume Krai. For service to government.
- Charles Kose Mero. For service to the community.
- Linda Joyce, Mrs. Naembo. For service to the public.
- Ms Poseiap Popau. For services to policing.
- Mel, Mrs. Puri. For public service.
- Kwalam Tangapi. For service to government.
- Kalale Wel. For service to the community.

==== British Empire Medal (Military) (B.E.M.) ====
- Sergeant Angus Aigilo, Papua New Guinea Defence Force.
- Sergeant James Komae, Papua New Guinea Defence Force.
- Warrant Officer Wamaope Tamaeo, Papua New Guinea Defence Force.
- Sergeant Tapu Waku, Papua New Guinea Defence Force.

=== Saint Christopher and Nevis ===
==== Order Of St Michael and St George ====
===== Companion of the Order of St Michael and St George (C.M.G.) =====
- Edmond St John Payne. For public service.

==== Order Of The British Empire ====
===== Officer of the Order of the British Empire (O.B.E.) =====
- Dr. Bertram Lincoln Charles. For public service.

==== British Empire Medal (B.E.M) ====
- Josephine Madrie, Mrs. Alexander. For services to the community.
- Ms Annie Clairmont. For services to the community.
- Victor Langelier Perineau. For services to the community.
- Ms Jane Plummer. For services to the community.
- Vivius Raymond. For services to the community.

=== Saint Lucia ===
==== Order Of St Michael and St George ====
===== Companion of the Order of St Michael and St George (C.M.G.) =====
- Frederick Nicholas Paul Devaux. For services to business and commerce.

==== Order Of The British Empire ====
===== Officers of the Order of the British Empire (O.B.E.) =====
- Michael Thomas Chastenet. For services to business, commerce and tourism.
- Eldon Cornibert Mathurin. For public service.

===== Members of the Order of the British Empire (M.B.E.) =====
- Monica, Mrs. Alcide. For services to the community.
- Johnson Flannan Cenac. For services to the public and the community.
- Julius Drysdale. For services to sports development and the public
- Augustina Florence, Mrs. Lastic. For services to the community.

==== British Empire Medal (B.E.M) ====
- Josephine Madrie, Mrs. Alexander. For services to the community.
- Ms Annie Clairmont. For services to the community.
- Victor Langelier Perineau. For services to the community.
- Ms Jane Plummer. For services to the community.
- Vivius Raymond. For services to the community.

=== Saint Vincent ===
==== Order Of The British Empire ====
===== Knights Commander of the Order of the British Empire (K.B.E.) =====
- Kenneth Dwight Vincent Venner, C.B.E. For services to the financial sector.

=== Solomon Islands ===
==== Knight Bachelor ====
- The Honourable Allan Kemakeza. For services to policing and politics.

==== Order Of The British Empire ====
===== Officer of the Order of the British Empire (O.B.E.) =====
- The Most Reverend Amos Stanley Waiaru. For services to the community and politics.

===== Member of the Order of the British Empire (M.B.E.) =====
- William Leslie Miki. For services to the community and the judiciary.

=== Tuvalu ===
==== Order Of The British Empire ====
===== Officer of the Order of the British Empire (O.B.E.) =====
- Elisala Pita. For public and community service.

===== Members of the Order of the British Empire (M.B.E.) =====
- Baueri Irata. For public and community service.
- Melitagi, Mrs. Lifuka. For public and community service
- Peifaga Pita. For public and community service.

==== British Empire Medal (B.E.M.) ====
- Valoaga Fonotapu. For services to the community.
- Vaiefa Mafoa, Mrs. Lui. For public and community service.
- Naniseni Tovia. For services to the community.
