= Tim Rollinson =

Tim Rollinson may refer to:

- Tim Rollinson (musician)
- Tim Rollinson (civil servant)
