= Peter Job =

British journalist and businessman (born 1941)

Sir Peter James Denton Job (born 13 July 1941) is a British journalist and businessman who was CEO of Reuters from 1991 to 2001.

Peter Job was born in Exeter, Devon, to Frederick Job and Marion Pickard Tanner. He was educated at Clifton College and Exeter College, Oxford. He holds Master of Business Administration from INSEAD. He began his career as a journalist with Reuters, first as a reporter then a manager, from 1963 to 1970, working in Paris, New Delhi, Kuala Lumpur, Jakarta, and Buenos Aires. He was managing director of Reuters Asia 1978–1990, director of Reuters Group 1989–2001, and CEO of Reuters Group from 1991 to 2001.

He was knighted in the 2001 Birthday Honours for services to the Information and Media Industry.

He married Christine Cobley in 1966, and has a daughter, Laura, and a son, Luke.
