= David Bills =

Australian forester and civil servant

David James Bills, CBE (9 February 1948 – 30 March 2014) was an Australian forester and civil servant.

Born in Tasmania on 9 February 1948, Bills studied at the Australian National University. After graduating, he worked in the Federal Forestry and Timber Bureau, before working for Associated Pulp and Paper Mills from 1978; he was eventually appointed to the board of its parent company, North Broken Hill Ltd and served as general manager from 1986 to 1995, overseeing Australia's largest forestry operation. He also served as president of the National Association of Forest Industries in 1994–95.

In 1995, he was appointed Director-General and Deputy Chairman of the Forestry Commission of the United Kingdom, serving until 2004. He oversaw the breaking up of forestry functions for the devolved nations of Scotland and Wales and also introduced the UK Woodland Assurance Standard. In recognition of his service, he was appointed a Commander of the Order of the British Empire (CBE) in the 2001 Birthday Honours and received the Gift to the Earth Award from the World Wildlife Foundation (its highest award). He was also chair of the Standing Committee of the Commonwealth Forestry Conference from 1996 to 2001 and in 2006 served as the president of the Commonwealth Forestry Association. He died on 30 March 2014 in Sydney.

Government offices
Preceded by Robin Cutler	Director-General and Deputy Chairman, Forestry Commission; 1995–2004	Succeeded by Tim Rollinson
