= Gwyn Jones Francis =

Welsh civil servant and forester

Gwyn Jones Francis, CB (17 September 1930 – 27 November 2015) was a Welsh civil servant and forester.

Born on 17 September 1930 at Llanelli, Francis was educated at the University College of North Wales, graduating in 1952 with a degree in forest botany. After two years of National Service, he entered the Forestry Commission in 1954, serving as a district officer in Wales. From 1960 to 1964, he was principal of the commission's Gwydr Forestry Training School and then spent a year completing an MSc at the University of Toronto.

Returning to the Forestry Commission, Francis held various posts in Wales before entering the headquarters in 1976. He was appointed a Forestry Commissioner in 1983 and in 1986 became Director-General and Deputy Chairman of the commission, serving until 1990 when he retired and was succeeded by Robin Cutler. In these senior positions, he oversaw development programmes which attracted over a billion pounds of investment into Scotland, primarily in the form of paper mills. As director-general, he introduced a tree-planting scheme in 1988 and negotiated with the government to keep the commission's enterprise and authority branches under the commission's control in spite of political proposals to break them up. For his services, he was appointed a Companion of the Order of the Bath (CB) in the 1990 New Year Honours. He died on 27 November 2015 in Edinburgh.

Government offices
Preceded by George Holmes	Director-General and Deputy Chairman, Forestry Commission; 1986–1990	Succeeded by Robin Cutler
