= George Holmes (civil servant) =

British civil servant (1926–2025)

George Dennis Holmes, CB, FRSE (9 November 1926 – 28 April 2025) was a British civil servant and forester.

== Life and career ==
Born in Conwy, Wales on 9 November 1926, Holmes studied at the University of Wales. He entered the staff of the Forestry Commission in 1948 and became Director of Research in 1968 and then Commissioner for Harvesting and Marketing in 1973, serving in that post until his appointment as the commission's Director-General and Deputy Chairman in 1977 in succession to John Dickson. He retired in 1986. Holmes was credited with introducing policies and grants for landowners to encourage the rehabilitation of woods of broad-leaved trees, which proved popular with conservationists.

For his service, he was appointed a Companion of the Order of the Bath (CB) in the 1979 Birthday Honours. He was elected a Fellow of the Royal Society of Edinburgh in 1982.

Holmes died on 28 April 2025, at the age of 98.

Government offices
Preceded by John Dickson	Director-General and Deputy Chairman, Forestry Commission; 1977–1986	Succeeded by Gwyn Jones Francis
