= John Dickson (civil servant) =

Scottish civil servant and forester (1915–1994)

John Abernethy Dickson, CB (19 September 1915 – 20 March 1994) was a Scottish civil servant and forester.

Born in Udny on 19 September 1915, he attended Robert Gordon's College then the University of Aberdeen, where he won the Sutherland Gold Medal in 1938 and graduated with MA and BSc degrees.

Dickson then entered the Forestry Commission, but was transferred to the Ministry of Supply during the Second World War, where he worked in the Timber Production Department. He returned to the Commission in 1946 and in 1956 became conservator for north Scotland. He was appointed Director of Forestry for Scotland in 1963, serving until 1965, when he was made Forestry Commissioner responsible for harvesting and marketing. He was the appointed Director-General and Deputy Chairman of the Forestry Commission in 1968 in succession to Sir Henry Beresford-Peirse. Serving until 1976, he did much to promote the commission's work to a sceptical Conservative government after 1970; he proved to be an effective administrator and implemented the mechanisation of the wood harvesting process. He was appointed a Companion of the Order of the Bath (CB) in 1970.

After leaving the commission, Dickson was a director of Economic Forestry (Scotland) from 1977 to 1984 and, from 1979 to 1986 a director of Forest Thinnings Ltd (he was chairman of the latter from 1981). He also chaired the Standing Committee on Commonwealth Forestry from 1968 to 1976 and was chairman of the Forestry Association from 1972 to 1975 (serving as vice-president thereafter). He died in Edinburgh on 20 March 1994.

Government offices
Preceded by Sir Henry Beresford-Peirse	Director-General and Deputy Chairman, Forestry Commission; 1968–1976	Succeeded by George Holmes
