= Kate Whiteford =

Scottish artist (born 1952)

Kate Whiteford OBE
- Born: 1952 (age 73–74)
- Website: www.katewhiteford.com

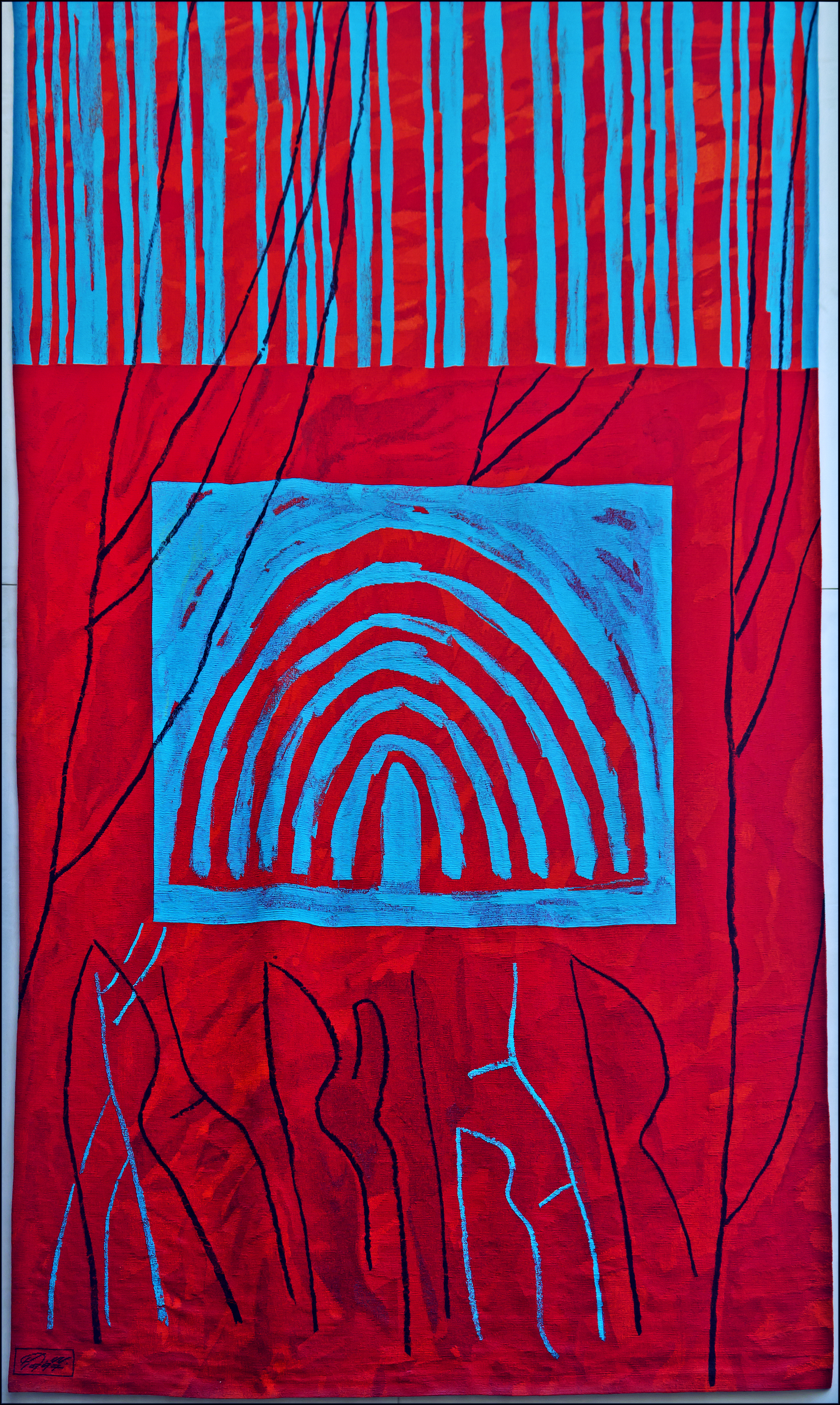
Corryvrechan Tapestry, 1997, designed by Kate Whiteford

Kate Whiteford OBE (born 1952) is a Scottish artist. Her work includes painting, screen prints, textiles, land art, and installations.

== Early life and education ==
Whiteford was born in Glasgow in 1952, and studied at the Glasgow School of Art from 1969 to 1972, followed in 1974–1976 with a degree in Art History from the University of Glasgow. In 1997, a British Council scholarship enabled her to travel to Italy, where she was struck by the frescoes of Pompei and Herculaneum with their classical images and reduced range of colours.

== Career ==
Whiteford is heavily influenced by archaeology, drawing inspiration from the local Pictish art. Her work spans textiles, video, land art, prints, and painting.

One of her works, an untitled 1988 screenprint, is in the permanent collection of the Tate Gallery.

She designed Corryvrechann tapestry for the opening of the then Museum of Scotland in 1998. It measures 8 by 4 metres (26 by 13 ft) and was woven by Dovecot Studios. Since 2003, it has hung in Hawthornden Court in the now National Museum of Scotland. In 2015, the museum's conservation team took down the 90-kilogram (200 lb) tapestry and moved it to a freezer where it was kept at -30 degrees for a week to eradicate moths. Corryvreckan, between the islands of Jura and Scarba, is the world's third-largest whirlpool.

She has made a series of land art works, including her 2001 Shadow of a Necklace in the grounds of Mount Stuart House on the Isle of Bute. This comprised a drawing of a necklace, dug into a large lawn and filled with silver sand, planted in 2003 with grass seed, which left a darker shadow on the lawn, gradually to fade away. It was inspired by a jet necklace found in a Bronze Age burial site at the site.

== Exhibitions ==
In 1990, she represented Great Britain at the Venice Biennale as part of Three Scottish Sculptors, along with David Mach and Arthur Watson.

Whiteford's work has also been included in other group shows, including:

- Expressions: Scottish Art 1976–1989, 2000
- Scottish Artists Prints, 1996, 1995, 1990
- From Art to Archaeology, 1991, 1992

In 2018, the Brontë Parsonage commissioned Whiteford to create a work about Emily Brontë’s hawk Nero, resulting in a video installation accompanied by a series of works on paper.

== Recognition ==
Whiteford was appointed OBE in the 2001 Birthday Honours "For services to Art".

The National Portrait Gallery holds a photographic portrait of Whiteford, by Heather Waddell, 1993.
