= Robin Cutler =

British forester and public servant (born 1934)

Timothy Robert Cutler, CBE (born 24 July 1934), known as Robin Cutler, is a British retired forester and public servant.

== Life and career ==
Born on 24 July 1934, he attended the University of Aberdeen, graduating in 1956 with a degree in forestry. After two years of National Service, he entered the Colonial Forest Service in 1958. In 1964 he entered the New Zealand Forest Service; promotions to Director of Forest Management and Deputy Director-General followed in 1978 and 1986 respectively, before he was appointed Chief Executive of the Ministry of Forestry in 1988.

Cutler left New Zealand in 1990, when he was appointed Director-General and Deputy Chairman of the Forestry Commission of the United Kingdom. He served in that capacity until he retired in 1995 and was replaced by David Bills. During his tenure, the government's Forest Review (1994) removed the commission's management section and turned it into its own agency, Forest Enterprise; the Conservative government had considered privatising the whole commission, but faced heavy opposition. According to Herald Scotland, Cutler was "largely credited with the more enlightened thinking of the Commission" during this period rapid change. He was appointed a Commander of the Order of the British Empire (CBE) in the 1995 Birthday Honours in recognition of his service.

Government offices
Preceded by Gwyn Jones Francis	Director-General and Deputy Chairman, Forestry Commission; 1990–1995	Succeeded by David Bills
