= List of high commissioners of the United Kingdom to Lesotho =

The high commissioner of the United Kingdom to Lesotho is the United Kingdom's diplomatic representative to the Kingdom of Lesotho.

== History ==
In 2005 the British Government closed its high commission in Maseru, and from then until 2019 British interests in Lesotho were represented by the British high commissioner to South Africa. The high commission in Maseru reopened in May 2019 with a resident high commissioner.

== List of heads of mission ==
=== High commissioners to Lesotho ===
- 1966–1970: Ian Watt
- 1970–1973: Harry Bass
- 1973–1976: Martin Moynihan
- 1976–1978: Reginald Hobden
- 1978–1981: Owen Griffith
- 1981–1984: Clive Clemens
- 1984–1988: Peter Rosling
- 1988–1991: John Edwards
- 1992–1996: Roy Cowling
- 1996–1999: Peter Smith
- 1999–2002: Kaye Oliver
- 2002–2005: Frank Martin
- 2005–2009: Paul Boateng (non-resident)
- 2009–2013: Dame Nicola Brewer (non-resident)
- 2013–2017: Dame Judith Macgregor (non-resident)
- 2017–2019: Nigel Casey (non-resident)
- 2019–2022: Anne Macro
- 2022–2025: Harry MacDonald
- 2025–present: Martine Sobey
