= Tim Rollinson (civil servant) =

British public servant

Timothy John Denis Rollinson, CBE, FICFor, FIAgrE (born 1953) is a British public servant and forester.

Born in 1953, Rollinson studied at the University of Edinburgh, graduating with a degree in ecological science and resource management. Originally planning to undertake a degree in psychology at Edinburgh, by the end of his first year his core group of friends were all ecology students and so he switched courses. On graduation, he entered the staff of the Forestry Commission in 1976, working as a district officer. From 1981 to 1993, he was successively head of growth and yield studies, head of land use planning and head of the Parliamentary and Policy Division.

Rollinson was then the commission's Secretary from 1994 to 1997, Chief Conservator for England between 1997 and 2000, and head of the Policy and Practice Division from 2000 to 2003. After a year as director of the Forestry Group, he was appointed Director-General and Deputy Chairman of the Forestry Commission in 2004. He served until 2013. After his retirement, the offices were abolished. In recognition of his service, he was appointed a Commander of the Order of the British Empire (CBE) in the 2012 Birthday Honours. He was also president of the Institute of Chartered Foresters from 2000 to 2002, having been elected a fellow in 1995. He is also a fellow of the Institution of Agricultural Engineers.

Government offices
Preceded by David Bills	Director-General and Deputy Chairman, Forestry Commission; 2004–2013	offices abolished
