= Dela Smith =

British schoolteacher and educator (born 1952)

Dame Dela Smith (born 10 October 1952) is a retired British schoolteacher and educator. She was Headteacher at Beaumont Hill Technology College, Darlington, from 1992 until she retired in 2010, after 35 years in the field of education.

In 2001 she became a Dame Commander of the Order of the British Empire (DBE).
