= National Professional Qualification for Headship =

The National Professional Qualification for Headship (or NPQH) is a professional qualification for aspiring headteachers. The qualification was introduced in 1997 by the newly elected Labour government, following a commitment in their manifesto to introduce a mandatory qualification for head teachers. Initially voluntary, the first group of people were awarded the qualification in July 1998. The legal requirement and qualification became mandatory on 1 April 2004. Until 8 February 2012, holding the NPQH was a mandatory requirement for all newly appointed English and Welsh school head teachers. It is taught via blended learning at centres all over the country, and administered by the National College for Teaching and Leadership which has centres in Manchester, Nottingham, London, and Ruddington.

It is intended to prepare experienced teachers for headships through training in management techniques, tutorial support, and achieving school standards.

In April 2005, the Conservative Party made scrapping the college and qualification a part of their manifesto for the May 2005 General Election, a move criticised by the incumbent Labour government and teaching union the National Association of Head Teachers.

== International Variations ==
There are reservations about the NPQH for international school leaders, particularly its Inadequate training in finance and governance. Early academic evaluations raised questions about the real impact of NPQH on readiness for headship.
