= Scottish Dental Practice Board =

The Scottish Dental Practice Board was created on 1 April 1989. It was previously called the Scottish Dental Estimates Board.

It is statutorily responsible for the fees (but not allowances) authorised to dentists by Practitioner Services.

A computerised payments system is operated for the board by NHS National Services Scotland. It also undertakes random and targeted examinations of patients through the Scottish Dental Reference Service.
