= 2026 United States electoral calendar =

2026 elections in the United States

This is a list of elections in the United States scheduled to be held in 2026.

== January ==
- January 6:
  - Connecticut, 25th House of Representatives district, special election
  - Georgia, 23rd House of Representatives district, special election (2nd round)
  - South Carolina, 98th House of Representatives district, special election
  - Virginia
    - 77th House of Delegates district, special election
    - 15th Senate district, special election
- January 13:
  - Alabama, 63rd House of Representatives district, special election
  - Connecticut, 139th House of Representatives district, special election
  - Virginia
    - 11th House of Delegates district, special election
    - 23rd House of Delegates district, special election
- January 20:
  - Georgia, 18th Senate district, special election (1st round)
  - Virginia, 17th House of Delegates district, special election
- January 27: Minnesota
  - House of Representatives district 47A, special election
  - House of Representatives district 64A, special election
- January 31: Texas
  - 18th congressional district, special election (2nd round)
  - 9th Senate district, special election (2nd round)

== February ==
- February 3:
  - Alabama, 38th House of Representatives district, special election
  - New York
    - 36th State Assembly district, special election
    - 74th State Assembly district, special election
    - 47th Senate district, special election
    - 61st Senate district, special election
- February 7: Louisiana
  - 3rd Senate district, special election (1st round)
  - 37th House of Representatives district, special election
  - 60th House of Representatives district, special election
  - 97th House of Representatives district, special election
  - 100th House of Representatives district, special election (1st round)
- February 10:
  - Oklahoma
    - 35th House of Representatives district, special election
    - Oklahoma City, Mayor
  - Virginia
    - 39th Senate district, special election
    - 5th House of Delegates district, special election
- February 17: Georgia, 18th Senate district, special election (2nd round)
- February 24:
  - Maine, 94th House of Representatives district, special election
  - Pennsylvania
    - 22nd House of Representatives district, special election
    - 42nd House of Representatives district, special election

== March ==
- March 3:
  - Arkansas
    - Primaries
    - Supreme Court, election
    - 26th Senate district, special election
    - 70th House of Representatives district, special election
  - Massachusetts, Senate's 1st Middlesex district, special election
  - North Carolina, primaries
  - Texas, primaries, party advisory questions
- March 10:
  - Georgia
    - 14th congressional district, special election (1st round)
    - 53rd Senate district, special election (1st round)
    - 94th House of Representatives district, special election (1st round)
    - 130th House of Representatives district, special election (1st round)
  - New Hampshire, House of Representatives Carroll 7 district, special election
  - Mississippi, Primaries
- Florida, Boca Raton, Mayor
- March 14: Louisiana
  - 3rd Senate district, special election (2nd round)
  - 69th House of Representatives district, special election
  - 100th House of Representatives district, special election (2nd round)
- March 17:
  - Pennsylvania
    - 79th House of Representatives district, special election
    - 193rd House of Representatives district, special election
  - Virginia, 98th House of Delegates district, special election
  - Illinois, primaries
- March 24: Florida
  - 14th Senate district, special election
  - 51st House of Representatives district, special election
  - 87th House of Representatives district, special election
- March 31:
  - Massachusetts, House of Representatives 5th Essex District, special election
  - Arkansas, primaries (runoff)

== April ==
- April 7:
  - Alaska, Anchorage, municipal elections
  - Georgia
    - 14th congressional district, special election (2nd round)
    - 53rd Senate district, special election (2nd round)
    - 94th House of Representatives district, special election (2nd round)
    - 130th House of Representatives district, special election (2nd round)
  - Wisconsin
    - Supreme Court, election
    - Waukesha, Mayor
- April 16: New Jersey, 11th congressional district, special election
- April 21: Virginia, ballot measure
- April 28: New York City, 3rd city council district, special election

== May ==
- May 2:
  - Texas
    - 4th Senate district, special election
    - Lubbock, Mayor
    - Irving, Mayor
- May 5:
  - Indiana, primaries
  - Ohio, primaries
  - Michigan, 35th Senate district, special election
- May 12:
  - North Carolina, primaries (runoff)
  - Nebraska, primaries
  - West Virginia
    - Primaries
    - Supreme Court of Appeals, election
  - Georgia, 177th House of Representatives district, special election
- New Jersey, Newark, mayor
- May 16:
  - Louisiana
    - Primaries
    - Amendment 1
    - Amendment 5
    - Supreme Court, election
- May 19:
  - Alabama
    - Primaries
    - Amendment 1
    - Amendment 2
  - Georgia
    - Primaries
    - Party advisory questions
    - Supreme Court, election
    - Court of Appeals, election
    - 7th Senate district, special election
  - Idaho, primaries
  - Kentucky, primaries
  - Oregon
    - Primaries
    - Commissioner of Labor, election
    - Ballot measure 120
    - Salem, Mayor
  - Pennsylvania
    - Primaries
    - 196th House of Representatives district, special election
- May 24: Libertarian Party, Chair
- May 26: Texas, primaries (runoff)

== June ==
- June 2:
  - California, primaries
    - 1st congressional district, special election
    - Alameda County, District Attorney
    - Long Beach, Mayor
    - Los Angeles, Mayor, City Attorney, City Controller, and City Council
    - Los Angeles County, Board of Supervisors, Sheriff, and Assessor
    - Sacramento, City Council
    - San Francisco, Proposition B, Proposition D
    - Santa Clara County, Board of Supervisors, District Attorney
  - Iowa, primaries
  - Montana, primaries
  - New Jersey, primaries
  - New Mexico, primaries
  - South Dakota
    - Primaries
    - Sioux Falls, Mayor
- June 9:
  - Maine, primaries
    - 29th House of Representatives district, special election
  - Nevada, primaries
  - North Dakota, primaries
  - South Carolina, primaries
  - Georgia, 177th House of Representatives district, special election (2nd round)
- June 16:
  - District of Columbia, primaries
    - District of Columbia, at-large, special election
  - Oklahoma, primaries
    - Question 832
  - Alabama, primaries (runoff)
  - Georgia, primaries (runoff)
    - 7th Senate district, special election (2nd round)
  - California, 14th congressional district, special election (1st round)
- June 23:
  - Maryland, primaries
  - New York, primaries
  - Utah, primaries
  - South Carolina, primaries (runoff)
  - South Dakota, Sioux Falls, Mayor (runoff)
- June 27: Louisiana, primaries (runoff)
- June 30: Colorado, primaries

== July ==
- July 21:
  - Arizona, primaries
    - Chandler, Mayor
  - Navajo Nation, primary
- July 28:
  - South Dakota, primaries
  - Georgia, 13th congressional district, special election (1st round)

== August ==
- August 1:
  - Guam, primaries
  - United States Virgin Islands, primaries
- August 4:
  - Michigan, primaries
    - Flint, Mayor
  - Kansas
    - Primaries
    - Ballot measure
  - Missouri
    - Primaries
    - Amendment 4
  - Virginia, primaries
  - Washington, primaries
- August 6: Tennessee
  - Primaries
  - County Mayors
- August 8: Hawaii, primaries
- August 11:
  - Alabama, special primaries
  - Connecticut, primaries
  - Minnesota, primaries
  - South Carolina, special primary
  - Vermont, primaries
  - Wisconsin, primaries
- August 18:
  - California, 14th congressional district, special election (runoff)
  - Florida, primaries
    - Tallahassee, Mayor
    - St. Petersburg, Mayor
    - Pensacola, Mayor
  - Alaska, primaries
  - Wyoming, primaries
- August 25:
  - Georgia, 13th congressional district, special election (runoff)
  - Alabama, Auburn, Mayor
  - Oklahoma, primaries (runoff)
  - South Carolina, special primary (runoff)

== September ==
- September 1: Massachusetts, primaries
- September 8: New Hampshire, primaries
- September 9: Rhode Island, primaries
- September 15: Delaware, primaries

== November ==
- 3 November: Midterm Elections
  - District of Columbia, elections
  - Alabama, elections
  - Alaska, elections
  - Arizona, elections
  - Arkansas, elections
  - California, elections
  - Colorado, elections
  - Connecticut, elections
  - Florida, elections
  - Georgia, elections
  - Hawaii, elections
  - Illinois, elections
  - Indiana, elections
  - Iowa, elections
  - Kansas, elections
  - Kentucky, elections
  - Maine, elections
  - Maryland, elections
  - Massachusetts, elections
  - Michigan, elections
  - Minnesota, elections
  - Nebraska, elections
  - Nevada, elections
  - New Hampshire, elections
  - New Mexico, elections
  - New York, elections
  - Ohio, elections
  - Oklahoma, elections
  - Oregon, elections
  - Pennsylvania, elections
  - Rhode Island, elections
  - South Carolina, elections
  - South Dakota, elections
  - Tennessee, elections
  - Texas, elections
  - Vermont, elections
  - Virginia, elections
  - Wisconsin, elections
  - Wyoming, elections
  - Northern Mariana Islands, elections
  - Guam, elections
  - United States Virgin Islands, elections
  - American Samoa, elections
  - Navajo Nation, presidential election

== See also ==
- 2026 United States elections
