= List of United States official election results by state =

Each state of the United States has an official website with election results, both for the current election and for historical elections; they are listed here. Many counties also have their own official election results pages, which are not listed here.

It is rare for a state to have a complete run of historical election records online; many of the official documents are only available in paper format, especially for years prior to 1990. Previous studies of election results data have noted that official records at the county level have been routinely archived, forgotten, or discarded.

Official results may be in PDF, Excel, CSV, HTML, Election Markup Language, or plain text formats, and may be scans of the original paper documents. Not everything here is easily machine readable for further processing. There are a number of sources for this data where the original source documents have been keyed in and checked and turned into machine readable databases.

A second table below illustrates with some examples of formats.

State	Office	Election URL	Results
United States	Federal Election Commission	https://www.fec.gov/introduction-campaign-finance/election-and-voting-information/	1982–2010
Alabama	Secretary of State of Alabama	https://www.sos.alabama.gov/alabama-votes/voter/election-information	Live - 2000–2012 1992–2012 1976–2000
Alaska	Alaska Division of Elections	http://www.elections.alaska.gov/	1960–2012
Arizona	Arizona Secretary of State	https://web.archive.org/web/20100716003728/https://www.azsos.gov/election/	1974–2012
Arkansas	Secretary of State of Arkansas	https://www.sos.arkansas.gov/elections/Pages/default.aspx	1976–2012
California	California Secretary of State	http://www.sos.ca.gov/elections/	1990–2012 1995–2011 1849–2012
Colorado	Secretary of State of Colorado	http://www.sos.state.co.us/pubs/elections/	1996–2012
Connecticut	Secretary of the State of Connecticut		2008–2012 1998–2007 1922–2012 (PDF)
Delaware	Delaware Commissioner of Elections	http://elections.delaware.gov/	1970–2012 1940–1952 (PDF)
District of Columbia	District of Columbia Board of Elections and Ethics	http://www.dcboee.org	1992–2012
Florida	Florida Division of Elections	https://web.archive.org/web/20090417203023/http://election.dos.state.fl.us/	1978–2012
Georgia	Georgia Secretary of State	http://www.sos.ga.gov/elections/	1988–2012
Hawaii	State of Hawaii Office of Elections	http://hawaii.gov/elections/	1992–2012
Idaho	Idaho Secretary of State	https://web.archive.org/web/20120213050000/http://www.sos.idaho.gov/elect/eleindex.htm	1990–2012
Illinois	Illinois State Board of Elections	https://web.archive.org/web/20070212042840/http://www.elections.il.gov/	1998–2012
Indiana	Secretary of State of Indiana	http://www.in.gov/sos/elections/index.htm	2001–2012
Iowa	Iowa Secretary of State	http://sos.iowa.gov/	1996–2012 1936–1990
Kansas	Kansas Secretary of State	http://www.kssos.org/elections/elections.html	1980–2012
Kentucky	Kentucky State Board of Elections	http://elect.ky.gov/Pages/default.aspx	1973–2012
Louisiana	Louisiana Secretary of State	http://www.sos.la.gov/	1982–2012
Maine	Secretary of State of Maine	http://www.maine.gov/sos/cec/elec/	1990–2012
Maryland	Maryland State Board of Elections	http://www.elections.state.md.us/	1986–2012
Massachusetts	Secretary of the Commonwealth of Massachusetts	https://www.sec.state.ma.us/ele/	2000–2012
Michigan	Michigan Secretary of State	http://www.michigan.gov/elections	1996–2012 1836–1904
Minnesota	Minnesota Secretary of State	http://www.sos.state.mn.us/index.aspx?page=4	1998–2012 1857–2011 (PDF)
Mississippi	Mississippi Secretary of State	https://web.archive.org/web/20110428224147/http://www.sos.ms.gov/elections.aspx	2003–2010 2011–2012
Missouri	Missouri Secretary of State	http://www.sos.mo.gov/elections/	2002–2012
Montana	Montana Secretary of State	http://sos.mt.gov/elections/index.asp	1992–2012
Nebraska	Nebraska Secretary of State	http://www.sos.ne.gov/dyindex.html	2000–2012
New Hampshire	New Hampshire Secretary of State	http://sos.nh.gov/Elections.aspx	1998–2012
New Jersey	New Jersey Secretary of State	http://njelections.org	1989–2012 1924–2012 (PDF)
New Mexico	New Mexico Secretary of State	http://www.sos.state.nm.us	1994–2012
New York	New York State Board of Elections	https://web.archive.org/web/20120107201434/http://www.elections.ny.gov/	1994–2012
North Carolina	North Carolina State Board of Elections	http://www.ncsbe.gov/	1992–2012 1948–1968
North Dakota	North Dakota Secretary of State	http://www.nd.gov/sos/electvote/	1889–2012 (yes 1889)
Ohio	Ohio Secretary of State	http://www.sos.state.oh.us/SOS/elections.aspx	1940–2012
Oklahoma	Oklahoma State Election Board	http://www.ok.gov/elections/index.html	2004–2012
Oregon	Oregon State Elections Division	http://sos.oregon.gov/	1988 - present
Pennsylvania	Pennsylvania Department of State	http://www.electionreturns.state.pa.us/	2000–2012
Rhode Island	Rhode Island Secretary of State	http://sos.ri.gov/elections/	1976–2010
South Carolina	South Carolina State Election Commission	http://www.scvotes.org/	1996–2012
South Dakota	South Dakota Secretary of State	http://sdsos.gov/Elections/Default.aspx	1889–2012
Tennessee	Tennessee Secretary of State	http://www.tn.gov/sos/election/index.htm	1998–2012
Texas	Texas Secretary of State	http://www.sos.state.tx.us/elections/index.shtml	1992–2012
Utah	Utah Lieutenant Governor	http://elections.utah.gov/	Live 2012 1960–2012
Vermont	Vermont Secretary of State	https://web.archive.org/web/20140210125755/http://vermont-elections.org/	Live 2012 1974–2012
Virginia	Virginia State Board of Elections	https://web.archive.org/web/20080516040912/http://www.sbe.virginia.gov/	1984–2012
Washington	Washington Secretary of State	http://www.sos.wa.gov/elections/	1900–2012
West Virginia	West Virginia Secretary of State	http://www.sos.wv.gov/elections/Pages/default.aspx	1950–2012
Wisconsin	Wisconsin Secretary of State	http://gab.wi.gov/elections-voting	2010–2012 2000–2009
Wyoming	Wyoming Secretary of State	http://soswy.state.wy.us/Elections/Elections.aspx	1996–2012

== Data formats ==
This table shows the variety of formats encountered when looking at election data. It aims, at the minimum, to show the easiest to process and the hardest to process examples from an election in each state.

State	Election	Data URL	Comments
Alabama	1992 General Election results, County level		Excel
Alabama	2010 Certified General Election Results, complete with write-in appendix		PDF; parts scanned with hand written corrections
Alaska	1960 General Election		PDF, scanned from typewritten manuscript
Alaska	2008 General Election		HTML, "GEMS Election Results" format
Arizona	1974 General Election Canvass		PDF, scanned from nth generation copy, italic font
Arizona	2010 General Election, unofficial results		Web-based reporting system from Clarity; detail reports in XML, TXT, Excel
Arkansas	1976 Election Results		PDF, scanned, some pages upside down
Arkansas	2006 Election Results Publication		Excel
California	1990 Statement of the Vote		PDF, scanned, fonts uneven/broken
California	2010 Statement of the Vote		PDF from digital original
California	2012 election results for news media		Election Markup Language format
Colorado	2010 Abstract of Votes Cast		PDF from digital original
Utah	2010 General Election		Excel
