= Politics of Pennsylvania =

Politics of a U.S. state

Results of the 2002 Pennsylvania gubernatorial election, illustrating the conservative central "T" concept. Note that although Democratic nominee Ed Rendell won fewer counties than Republican opponent D. Michael Fisher, Rendell carried the more populous areas of Pittsburgh and Philadelphia to win the election.

Pennsylvania is generally considered a highly competitive swing state. Throughout its entire history, it voted for the nationwide loser on only 10 occasions (1824, 1884, 1892, 1912, 1916, 1932, 1948, 1968, 2000, and 2004) meaning it has voted for the national winner 83% of the time as of 2024. Although, it generally supported Republicans between the Civil War and New Deal eras, as it voted Republican in every election between 1860 and 1932, except for 1912, when the Republican vote was split. Even then, the state's strong Republican ties meant that it backed Republican-turned-Progressive Theodore Roosevelt. The state backed a Democrat in 1936 for the first time since 1856. Pennsylvania generally leaned Democratic from the 1990s until the 2010s, as it backed the Democratic presidential candidate in every election since 1992 until 2016, when it was won by Republican candidate Donald Trump. After narrowly losing the state in 2020, Trump flipped it back in 2024.

In 2008, Democrat Barack Obama won the state by a margin of over 10 percent, the largest victory seen in a presidential election in Pennsylvania since Richard Nixon's victory in 1972. In 2016, Donald Trump became the first Republican presidential candidate to win Pennsylvania since George H.W. Bush in 1988, winning by a margin of 0.7 percent. In 2020, Democrat Joe Biden defeated Donald Trump in the state by 1.2 percent. In 2024, Donald Trump defeated Kamala Harris by 1.7 percent.

Pennsylvania has a split government as of June 2025, with the governor's office being held by Democrat Josh Shapiro, the state house being controlled by the Democratic Party, and the state senate being controlled by the Republican Party. Republicans control three statewide offices in Pennsylvania: Treasurer, Auditor General, and Attorney General. In the United States Senate, Pennsylvania is represented by Republican Dave McCormick and Democrat John Fetterman. In the United States House of Representatives, Pennsylvania is represented by 10 Republicans and 7 Democrats.

Pennsylvania's former Senator, Arlen Specter, announced in April 2009 that he was switching his party affiliation from Republican to Democratic, citing the Republicans' shift to the right since he was elected in 1980, though others suspected he switched because he would face a tough Republican primary election in 2010. As it turned out, he ended up losing the Democratic primary to Representative Joe Sestak. Congressman Sestak narrowly lost the general election to Pat Toomey in November 2010, returning the Senate seat to Republicans.

== History ==
United States presidential election results for Pennsylvania
Year	Republican / Whig		Democratic		Third party(ies)	
Year	No.	%	No.	%	No.	%
1824	5,436	11.50%	35,929	76.04%	5,887	12.46%
1828	50,848	33.34%	101,652	66.66%	0	0.00%
1832	0	0.00%	91,949	57.96%	66,689	42.04%
1836	87,235	48.82%	91,457	51.18%	0	0.00%
1840	144,010	50.00%	143,676	49.88%	340	0.12%
1844	161,125	48.59%	167,447	50.50%	3,000	0.90%
1848	185,313	50.28%	171,976	46.66%	11,263	3.06%
1852	179,104	46.18%	198,562	51.20%	10,173	2.62%
1856	147,286	32.01%	230,686	50.13%	82,189	17.86%
1860	268,030	56.26%	16,765	3.52%	191,647	40.22%
1864	296,391	51.75%	276,316	48.25%	0	0.00%
1868	342,280	52.20%	313,382	47.80%	0	0.00%
1872	349,589	62.07%	212,041	37.65%	1,632	0.29%
1876	384,184	50.62%	366,204	48.25%	8,605	1.13%
1880	444,704	50.84%	407,428	46.57%	22,651	2.59%
1884	478,804	52.97%	392,785	43.46%	32,275	3.57%
1888	526,091	52.74%	446,633	44.77%	24,844	2.49%
1892	516,011	51.45%	452,264	45.09%	34,735	3.46%
1896	728,300	60.98%	433,228	36.27%	32,827	2.75%
1900	712,665	60.74%	424,232	36.16%	36,313	3.10%
1904	840,949	68.00%	337,998	27.33%	57,791	4.67%
1908	745,779	58.84%	448,782	35.41%	72,889	5.75%
1912	273,360	22.45%	395,637	32.49%	548,739	45.06%
1916	703,823	54.25%	521,784	40.22%	71,685	5.53%
1920	1,218,216	65.76%	503,843	27.20%	130,557	7.05%
1924	1,401,481	65.34%	409,192	19.08%	334,177	15.58%
1928	2,055,382	65.24%	1,067,586	33.89%	27,642	0.88%
1932	1,453,540	50.84%	1,295,948	45.33%	109,689	3.84%
1936	1,690,200	40.84%	2,353,987	56.88%	94,239	2.28%
1940	1,889,848	46.33%	2,171,035	53.23%	17,831	0.44%
1944	1,835,054	48.36%	1,940,479	51.14%	19,260	0.51%
1948	1,902,197	50.93%	1,752,426	46.92%	80,525	2.16%
1952	2,415,789	52.74%	2,146,269	46.85%	18,911	0.41%
1956	2,585,252	56.49%	1,981,769	43.30%	9,482	0.21%
1960	2,439,956	48.74%	2,556,282	51.06%	10,303	0.21%
1964	1,673,657	34.70%	3,130,954	64.92%	18,079	0.37%
1968	2,090,017	44.02%	2,259,405	47.59%	398,506	8.39%
1972	2,714,521	59.11%	1,796,951	39.13%	80,633	1.76%
1976	2,205,604	47.73%	2,328,677	50.40%	86,506	1.87%
1980	2,261,872	49.59%	1,937,540	42.48%	362,089	7.94%
1984	2,584,323	53.34%	2,228,131	45.99%	32,449	0.67%
1988	2,300,087	50.70%	2,194,944	48.39%	41,220	0.91%
1992	1,791,841	36.13%	2,239,164	45.15%	928,805	18.73%
1996	1,801,169	39.97%	2,215,819	49.17%	489,130	10.85%
2000	2,281,127	46.43%	2,485,967	50.60%	146,025	2.97%
2004	2,793,847	48.42%	2,938,095	50.92%	37,648	0.65%
2008	2,655,885	44.15%	3,276,363	54.47%	83,228	1.38%
2012	2,680,434	46.57%	2,990,274	51.95%	84,912	1.48%
2016	2,970,742	48.17%	2,926,458	47.45%	269,738	4.37%
2020	3,379,055	48.69%	3,461,221	49.87%	100,173	1.44%
2024	3,543,308	50.20%	3,423,042	48.50%	92,001	1.30%

Philadelphia is the Democratic stronghold of the state, often delivering huge margins for the Democrats in statewide elections. Other urban areas, such as Pittsburgh, Erie, Harrisburg, Allentown, and Scranton lean Democratic as well. Like most states, Pennsylvania's rural areas tend to be more conservative and support Republicans. The resulting political map of Pennsylvania is therefore a red "T" in the center of the state with the Pittsburgh and Philadelphia areas a strong blue. In more recent years, the traditionally Democratic-voting areas in southwestern Pennsylvania have become much more Republican, especially after 2004, similar to other coal country areas in West Virginia and Kentucky. By 2016, counties that once voted for John Kerry in 2004 in the counties surrounding Allegheny County supported Donald Trump by more than 60%. The true swing areas of the state are the suburbs of the large cities, notably Philadelphia's collar counties and the Pittsburgh suburbs.

On the state level, Pennsylvania has been a traditionally liberal Republican state, with a dominant state Republican Party that is much more oriented towards social spending than more conservative state Republican Parties in other regions of the United States. However, the recent Democratic trend in Pennsylvania has affected state politics, and the Democrats controlled the governor's mansion for all but four years since 2003 starting with the two terms under Governor Ed Rendell. After losing the governorship for four years to Tom Corbett from 2011 to 2015, Democratic Governor Tom Wolf defeated Corbett's re-election bid in 2014. Democrat Josh Shapiro succeeded him after the 2022 election, resulting in Democrats winning the governorship three times in a row for the first time since 1844.

On January 22, 2018, in League of Women Voters of Pennsylvania v. Commonwealth of Pennsylvania, the Supreme Court of Pennsylvania mandated that the state's congressional map be redrawn, finding that the current map was unconstitutionally drawn to favor Republicans and disenfranchise Democratic voters, a process known as gerrymandering. Less than one month later, a new congressional map was drawn and approved. The new map would take place in the May primaries. With the new congressional map in place, Democrats had a net gain of three congressional seats, giving the Democratic Party half of Pennsylvania's congressional seats. Also in the 2018 midterm elections, Governor Tom Wolf won reelection by a margin of 17 percent, Bob Casey Jr. was reelected to a third term in the U.S. Senate, John Fetterman unseated incumbent lieutenant governor Mike Stack, and the Republican Party maintained control of the state legislature.

== Federal relations ==
During the Tom Ridge administration, the Commonwealth of Pennsylvania maintained a permanent in-house lobbying office in Washington, D.C., to lobby the federal government of the United States. During the Ed Rendell administration, the Commonwealth closed that office and entered into a $720,000 annual contract with Blank Rome to lobby the federal government. The Rendell administration says that the contract with Blank Rome was $140,000 less per year than maintaining a permanent state office in Washington.

== Federal representation ==
Pennsylvania currently has 17 House districts. In the 119th Congress, ten are held by Republicans and seven are held by Democrats:

- Pennsylvania's 1st congressional district represented by Brian Fitzpatrick (R)
- Pennsylvania's 2nd congressional district represented by Brendan Boyle (D)
- Pennsylvania's 3rd congressional district represented by Dwight Evans (D)
- Pennsylvania's 4th congressional district represented by Madeleine Dean (D)
- Pennsylvania's 5th congressional district represented by Mary Gay Scanlon (D)
- Pennsylvania's 6th congressional district represented by Chrissy Houlahan (D)
- Pennsylvania's 7th congressional district represented by Ryan Mackenzie (R)
- Pennsylvania's 8th congressional district represented by Rob Bresnahan (R)
- Pennsylvania's 9th congressional district represented by Dan Meuser (R)
- Pennsylvania's 10th congressional district represented by Scott Perry (R)
- Pennsylvania's 11th congressional district represented by Lloyd Smucker (R)
- Pennsylvania's 12th congressional district represented by Summer Lee (D)
- Pennsylvania's 13th congressional district represented by John Joyce (R)
- Pennsylvania's 14th congressional district represented by Guy Reschenthaler (R)
- Pennsylvania's 15th congressional district represented by Glenn Thompson (R)
- Pennsylvania's 16th congressional district represented by Mike Kelly (R)
- Pennsylvania's 17th congressional district represented by Chris Deluzio (D)

Pennsylvania's two United States senators are Democrat John Fetterman and Republican Dave McCormick, serving since 2023 and 2025, respectively.

Pennsylvania is part of the United States District Court for the Eastern District of Pennsylvania, United States District Court for the Middle District of Pennsylvania, and United States District Court for the Western District of Pennsylvania in the federal judiciary. The district's cases are appealed to the Philadelphia-based United States Court of Appeals for the Third Circuit.

== See also ==
- Government of Pennsylvania
- Elections in Pennsylvania
- Political party strength in Pennsylvania
