= 2026 Nebraska elections =

United States elections

- November 3, 2026

The 2026 Nebraska elections were held in the U.S. state of Nebraska on in 2026 as part of the 2026 United States elections.

== Local ==
- 2026 Douglas County, Nebraska, elections
- 2026 University of Nebraska Board of Regents election
