= Elections in Pennsylvania =

Elections in Pennsylvania elect the five state-level offices, the Pennsylvania General Assembly, including the senate and house of representatives, as well as the state's congressional delegation for the United States Senate and the United States House of Representatives. Presidential elections are held every four years in Pennsylvania. Considered a swing state, it is one of the most competitive nationally, with narrow victories that alternate between the parties across all major offices. On the presidential level, the state has voted for the nationwide loser on only 10 occasions (1824, 1884, 1892, 1912, 1916, 1932, 1948, 1968, 2000, and 2004), meaning it has voted for the national winner 83% of the time, as of 2020.

In a 2020 study, Pennsylvania was ranked by the Election Law Journal as the 19th hardest state for citizens to vote in, based on registration and identification requirements, and convenience provisions.

== House of Representatives ==
Pennsylvania's congressional delegation is composed of nine Democrats and eight Republicans, since the 2022 elections.

The five most recent House elections:

- 2024 United States House of Representatives elections in Pennsylvania
- 2022 United States House of Representatives elections in Pennsylvania
- 2020 United States House of Representatives elections in Pennsylvania
- 2018 United States House of Representatives elections in Pennsylvania
- 2016 United States House of Representatives elections in Pennsylvania

== Presidential elections ==
Below is a table of Pennsylvania's majority vote in the last twelve presidential elections, alongside the national electoral college results. On the presidential level, the state has voted for the nationwide loser on only 10 occasions – 1824, 1884, 1892, 1912, 1916, 1932, 1948, 1968, 2000, and 2004 – meaning it has voted for the national winner 83% of the time, as of 2020. Beginning with the 1992 election, the state has leaned Democratic, voting that way in seven of the nine elections from that year, though mostly by margins under 10 points.

Vote in Pennsylvania		National vote	
Year	Candidate	Year	Candidate
1980	Ronald Reagan	1980	Ronald Reagan
1984	Ronald Reagan	1984	Ronald Reagan
1988	George H. W. Bush	1988	George H. W. Bush
1992	Bill Clinton	1992	Bill Clinton
1996	Bill Clinton	1996	Bill Clinton
2000	Al Gore	2000	George W. Bush
2004	John Kerry	2004	George W. Bush
2008	Barack Obama	2008	Barack Obama
2012	Barack Obama	2012	Barack Obama
2016	Donald Trump	2016	Donald Trump
2020	Joe Biden	2020	Joe Biden
2024	Donald Trump	2024	Donald Trump

== United States Senate elections ==
=== Class I Senate elections ===
The five most recent elections:

- 2024 United States Senate election in Pennsylvania
- 2018 United States Senate election in Pennsylvania
- 2012 United States Senate election in Pennsylvania
- 2006 United States Senate election in Pennsylvania
- 2000 United States Senate election in Pennsylvania

=== Class III Senate elections ===
The five most recent elections:

- 2022 United States Senate election in Pennsylvania
- 2016 United States Senate election in Pennsylvania
- 2010 United States Senate election in Pennsylvania
- 2004 United States Senate election in Pennsylvania
- 1998 United States Senate election in Pennsylvania

Republican Senator Dave McCormick entered office in 2025 after defeating Bob Casey Jr in the 2024 election. Democratic senator John Fetterman entered office in January 2023, succeeding Republican Pat Toomey who retired after two terms.

== Gubernatorial elections ==
Gubernatorial election results
Year	Democratic	Republican
1950	48.3% 1,710,355	50.7% 1,796,119
1954	53.7% 1,996,266	46.2% 1,717,070
1958	50.8% 2,024,852	48.9% 1,948,769
1962	44.3% 1,938,627	55.3% 2,424,918
1966	46.1% 1,868,719	52.1% 2,110,349
1970	55.2% 2,043,029	41.7% 1,542,854
1974	53.7% 1,878,252	45.1% 1,578,917
1978	46.4% 1,737,888	52.5% 1,996,042
1982	48.1% 1,772,353	50.8% 1,872,784
1986	50.4% 1,717,484	48.4% 1,638,268
1990	67.7% 2,065,244	32.4% 987,516
1994	39.9% 1,430,099	45.4% 1,627,976
1998	31.0% 938,745	57.4% 1,736,844
2002	53.4% 1,913,235	44.4% 1,589,408
2006	60.3% 2,470,517	39.6% 1,622,135
2010	45.5% 1,814,788	54.5% 2,172,763
2014	54.9% 1,920,355	45.1% 1,575,511
2018	57.8% 2,850,210	40.7% 2,015,266
2022	56.5% 3,031,137	41.7% 2,238,477

The ten most recent elections:

- 2022 Pennsylvania gubernatorial election
- 2018 Pennsylvania gubernatorial election
- 2014 Pennsylvania gubernatorial election
- 2010 Pennsylvania gubernatorial election
- 2006 Pennsylvania gubernatorial election
- 2002 Pennsylvania gubernatorial election
- 1998 Pennsylvania gubernatorial election
- 1994 Pennsylvania gubernatorial election
- 1990 Pennsylvania gubernatorial election
- 1986 Pennsylvania gubernatorial election

Democrats and Republicans have alternated in the governorship of Pennsylvania every eight years from 1950 to 2010. This has been referred to as "the cycle", but it was broken with a Democratic Party win in 2014. Pennsylvania has also voted against the party of the sitting president in 19 of the last 21 gubernatorial contests dating back to 1938; Democrats lost 16 of the previous 18 Pennsylvania gubernatorial races with a Democratic president in the White House, a pattern begun in 1860.

== Pennsylvania General Assembly elections ==
The Pennsylvania General Assembly is a bicameral legislature, consisting of the Pennsylvania State Senate (the upper house) and the Pennsylvania House of Representatives (lower house). Members of the state house serve for 2 year terms, while the term for the state senate is 4 years. There are no limits on the amount of terms that members of the state legislature can serve. Republicans controlled the state House for all but four years from 1995 until 2023, and they have controlled the state Senate uninterrupted since 1993.

=== Senate ===
The five most recent elections:

- 2024 Pennsylvania Senate election
- 2022 Pennsylvania Senate election
- 2020 Pennsylvania Senate election
- 2018 Pennsylvania Senate election
- 2016 Pennsylvania Senate election

=== House of Representatives ===
The five most recent elections:

- 2024 Pennsylvania House of Representatives election
- 2022 Pennsylvania House of Representatives election
- 2020 Pennsylvania House of Representatives election
- 2018 Pennsylvania House of Representatives election
- 2016 Pennsylvania House of Representatives election

== See also ==
- Electoral reform in Pennsylvania
- Political party strength in Pennsylvania
- Politics of Pennsylvania
- 2026 Pennsylvania elections
- Women's suffrage in Pennsylvania
- List of Pennsylvania ballot measures
