= 2026 Rhode Island ballot measures =

There will be five ballot measures in the 2026 Rhode Island elections. Topics include funding for higher education, funding for the construction of a new Rhode Island State History Center, and funding for water infrastructure projects. All ballot measures are part of a budget proposal signed by current Rhode Island Governor Dan McKee.

As of November 8, 2026, with all towns reporting, all five ballot measures were approved.

== Measures on the ballot ==
No.	Question	Full text (link)	Proponents	Opponents	Date	Yes	No
1	Higher Education Facilities Bond Measure	Full text of measure	Gov. Dan McKee Community College of Rhode Island	Americans for Tax Reform	Nov 3	208,758 59.99%	139,208 40.01%
2	Housing Development Bond Measure	Full text of measure	Gov. Dan McKee (D) Housing Network of Rhode Island One Neighborhood Builders Women's Development Corporation	Americans for Tax Reform	Nov 3	212,808 61.31%	134,280 38.69%
3	Economic and Infrastructure Development Bond Measure	Full text of measure	Gov. Dan McKee (D) Partnership for Rhode Island	Americans for Tax Reform	Nov 3	162,633 47.68%	178,489 52.32%
4	Historical Center and Cultural Grants Bond Measure	Full text of measure	Gov. Dan McKee (D) Secretary of State Gregg Amore (D) National Education Association of Rhode Island Rhode Island AFL-CIO	Americans for Tax Reform	Nov 3	170,080 49.38%	174,376 50.62%
5	Environment and Watershed Protection and Development Bond Measure	Full text of measure	Gov. Dan McKee (D) State Sen. Louis DiPalma (D) State Rep. Megan Cotter (D) Rhode Island Infrastructure Bank Audubon Society of Rhode Island Clean Water Action Climate Action Rhode Island Climate Jobs Rhode Island Rhode Island Environmental Education Association Rhode Island Infrastructure Bank Rhode Island Land Trust Council Rhode Island League of Cities and Towns Save The Bay The Nature Conservancy	Americans for Tax Reform	Nov 3	232,243 67.08%	113,962 32.92%

== Question 1 ==
Question 1 calls for the issue of bonds totaling $275 million for the construction and improvement of higher education facilities. Specifically, this includes $165 million for the construction of a new, integrated health building at the University of Rhode Island, $60 million for the Warwick campus of the Community College of Rhode Island to build a workforce innovation center, and $50 million to Rhode Island College to build a student success and career readiness center. The Rhode Island Current estimates that the total cost will increase to $441.3 million, accounting for inflation and a 20 year repayment timeline. The building at the University of Rhode Island is estimated to be ready for use by 2031, the renovations of Addams Library at Rhode Island College completed by 2030, and the new workforce center at CCRI will begin construction in 2028 and by completed by 2030.

Proponents of the bond measure include current Rhode Island Governor Dan McKee, and the Community College of Rhode Island. Opponents include the Rhode Island chapter of Americans for Tax Reform.

== Question 2 ==
Question 2 calls for the issue of bonds totaling $120 million to construct and develop various affordable housing projects. At least $25 million of this will be allocated to projects focused on homeownership. Up to $10 million may be used for a public housing development program. These housing projects are projected to begin by 2028, and be completed between 2029 and 2032, with an estimated usefulness of 30 years.

Proponents of the bond measure include current Rhode Island Governor Dan McKee, the Housing Network of Rhode Island, One Neighborhood Builders, and the Women's Development Corporation. Opponents include the Rhode Island chapter of Americans for Tax Reform.

== Question 3 ==
Question 3 calls for the issue of bonds totaling $100 million to fund infrastructure and economic development projects. Of that, $55 million would be designated for infrastructure improvements and site development, and $45 million would be designated for infrastructure projects to support the state's oceans. It is estimated that the total cost will come to $160.5 million, when accounting for a 5% interest rate and a 20 year repayment plan. The bond does not cite specific projects, but does include broad categories that may be eligible for funding. These include development of Quonset Business Park, and Providence’s I-195 District.

As with the other ballot measures, these bonds are part of a proposal from current Rhode Island Governor Dan McKee. Other proponents include the organization Partnership for Rhode Island, while opponents include the Rhode Island chapter of Americans for Tax Reform.

== Question 4 ==
Question 4 calls for the issue of bonds totaling $50 million to fund cultural and historical projects. Of that, $45 million would be designated for the construction of a new Rhode Island State History Center, and $5 million would be to match grants administered by the Rhode Island Historical Preservation and Heritage Commission. If passed, the Rhode Island State History Center would open in 2030. This center is a longtime goal of current Secretary of State Gregg Amore. The project would also involve moving various historical archives from the University of Rhode Island to the new center.

In addition to Secretary of State Gregg Amore, this measure is supported by current Rhode Island Governor Dan McKee, as well as National Education Association Rhode Island, and the Rhode Island AFL-CIO. It is opposed by the Rhode Island chapter of American's for Tax Reform.

== Question 5 ==
Question 5 call for the issue of bonds totaling $55 million to fund recreational facilities, water infrastructure projects, and environmental preservation. Twenty-five million dollars would go to the Resilient Rhody Infrastructure Fund, which is managed by the Rhode Island Infrastructure Bank, which would provide up to 75% matching grants to projects to protect against the effects of climate change. Twelve million would fund recreational and park facilities and improvements, and $7 million would go to matching grants for projects to protect Narragansett Bay. Additionally, $3 million would go to cleaning up "brownfields", or former industrial sites, to turn them into useful community spaces. Projects for farmland restoration and the preservation of open spaces would each receive $3 million, and local recreation and marine development would each receive $1 million. Many of these funds will be matched by other sources, and are projected to create jobs throughout the state.

The bond measure is supported by a broad coalition of environmental organizations, including the Rhode Island chapters of the Nature Conservancy, the Audubon Society, and Clean Water Action. It is also supported by Governor Dan McKee, State Senator Louis DiPalma, and State Representative Megan Cotter. Opponents include the Rhode Island chapter of Americans for Tax Reform.
