= As Maine goes, so goes the nation =

Maxim in United States politics

"As Maine goes, so goes the nation" was once a maxim in United States politics. The phrase described Maine's reputation as a bellwether state for presidential elections. Maine's September election of a governor predicted the party outcome of the November presidential election in 21 out of the 28 presidential election years from 1820 to 1932: namely 1820–1844, 1852 (albeit overturned in a run-off in the state legislature), 1860–1876, 1888, 1896–1908 and 1920–1928; more importantly, as Maine was a generally Republican-leaning state, the margin of the September elections compared to expectations could predict national November results more than the identity of the winning party in Maine. A contest still won by the Republicans but with a narrower margin than usual would still predict good Democratic results nationally.

Maine's reputation as a bellwether began in 1840, when it elected Edward Kent, the Whig Party candidate, as its governor; two months later, the Whig Party presidential candidate, William Henry Harrison, won the 1840 presidential election. Again in 1888, Maine voted solidly for Republican Party candidates, and Republican Benjamin Harrison won the presidential election despite losing the overall popular vote nationwide. The saying originated following this election, though it is unknown by whom.

Beginning with its creation as a state in 1820 when it split off from Massachusetts, Maine held its elections for statewide and congressional offices in September, not in November as most other states did, due to frigid November weather and Maine's early harvest (Maine did hold its presidential elections in November). Maine was a reliably Republican state during the time period, but the size of the margin was predictive; a close run in September in Maine would predict good results for Democrats in the rest of the country in November, while a Republican landslide would suggest a good Republican year.

In subsequent election cycles, national political parties often went to considerable lengths to win Maine's early congressional and statewide elections, despite the state's relatively small population (giving it two seats in the House of Representatives and four electoral votes in the November presidential elections) and somewhat remote location in the far northeast of the continental United States.

== Bellwether no more ==
In 1936, Maine elected Republican governor Lewis O. Barrows, an overwhelmingly Republican state legislature, and an all-Republican congressional delegation in its early balloting. While Maine had elected a Democratic governor (Louis J. Brann) and two Democratic congressmen in both 1932 (although President Herbert Hoover, a Republican, carried it in his unsuccessful bid for re-election that November) and 1934, the Republicans had been making gains in the Maine Legislature: as such, the Republican victories in Maine in September 1936 caused Republicans to trumpet the phrase and predict a national trend.

That November, however, Maine and Vermont were the only states that Republican nominee Alf Landon carried over President Franklin D. Roosevelt in the 1936 presidential election, giving Landon only eight electoral votes (the three from Vermont and the five from Maine), equalling the smallest total ever (as of 2024) won by a major-party nominee since the beginning of the current U.S. two-party system in 1856: Landon was defeated by Roosevelt in an unprecedented landslide, destroying any credibility of the phrase, and also lost his home state of Kansas by a large margin.

James Farley, a leading Democratic strategist who managed FDR's campaign, quipped "As Maine goes, so goes Vermont."

In fact, since the birth of the Republican Party in 1854, Vermont and Maine have voted for different presidential candidates in the same election only twice: in 1912, a third-party campaign by former Republican president Theodore Roosevelt split the Republican vote with President William Howard Taft, enabling Democrat Woodrow Wilson to flip Maine with just 39% of the vote. Later, in 1968, favorite son Senator Edmund Muskie of Maine was the vice-presidential candidate on the losing Democratic ticket led by Hubert Humphrey, and flipped the state. During the same time, Vermont was still a mostly reliable Republican stronghold (having only voted Democratic once, in Lyndon B. Johnson's 1964 landslide): both states would shift to being reliably Democratic in 1992, and have not voted Republican since.

Following the 1936 election debacle, only one out of the five presidential elections from 1940 to 1956 had the party whose nominee won Maine's September gubernatorial election win the presidential election: in 1952, Republican Burton M. Cross was elected Governor, while Dwight D. Eisenhower was elected to his first term as president.

In 1959, Maine changed its election laws to hold all general elections in November, and since 1960, has held elections at the same time as the rest of the country.

== See also ==
- ...So Goes the Nation
- Missouri bellwether
- Blue wall
- Southern strategy
