= Justin Solomon =

American politician

Member of the University of Nebraska Board of Regents from the 4th district
- Assuming office January 7, 2027
- Succeeding: Joel Makovicka

Personal details
- Party: Democratic
- Education: University of Nebraska–Lincoln

Justin Solomon is an American politician and business executive who is a member-elect of the University of Nebraska Board of Regents for the 4th district. A member of the Nebraska Democratic Party, he was first elected in 2026.

== Early life and education ==
Solomon attended the University of Nebraska–Lincoln, where he was a student regent and was the student body president from 2010 to 2011. He graduated with a master's degree in business administration.

== Career ==
Solomon worked as the chief operating officer and chief financial officer of Integrated Life Choices, an organization that helps people with disabilities.

=== University of Nebraska Board of Regents ===
In February 2026, Solomon announced his candidacy in the special election for the 4th district on the University of Nebraska Board of Regents. He advanced from the nonpartisan primary election in May, finishing second behind fellow Democrat Susanne Shore on May 12. On November 3, he defeated Shore with over 60% of the vote.
