= 2026 Pennsylvania elections =

- November 3, 2026

The 2026 Pennsylvania elections were held in the state of Pennsylvania on November 3, 2026, alongside the nationwide midterm elections. Elections were held for governor as well as all 17 of the state's U.S. House of Representatives seats, half of the seats in the State Senate, and all seats in the State House. Primary elections were held on May 19, 2026.

Pennsylvania has been a crucial swing state in recent years. Donald Trump became the first Republican since 1988 to win Pennsylvania on the presidential level in 2016, and won it again in 2024. Democrats currently have a one seat majority in the House of Representatives, and Republicans have a two seat majority in the State Senate. The state's U.S. Senate delegation is split between Republicans and Democrats, following the ousting of Bob Casey Jr. by Dave McCormick in 2024. Democrats currently control the governorship.

== United States House of Representatives ==
All of Pennsylvania's 17 seats in the United States House of Representatives are up for election in 2026.

10 seats are currently held by Republicans, and 7 are currently held by Democrats.

== Governor ==
Incumbent Democratic governor Josh Shapiro was first elected in 2022 with 56.5% of the vote. He is eligible to run for re-election to a second term in office and in January 2026 announced he would do so.

Incumbent state treasurer Stacy Garrity is running for the Republican nomination with, as of yet, no primary opposition after securing the endorsement of Donald Trump. State senator Doug Mastriano, who was the Republican nominee for governor in 2022, also considered a second run for governor, but ultimately declined.

== State Senate ==
25 of the 50 in the Pennsylvania State Senate are up for election in 2026. Republicans have held control of the chamber since 1994.

Republicans currently hold 27 seats in the State Senate, and Democrats hold 23.

== State House of Representatives ==
All 203 seats in the Pennsylvania House of Representatives are up for election in 2026. Democrats flipped control of the chamber in 2022 for the first time since 2010 and retained control in 2024 with a one seat majority.

Democrats currently control 103 seats in the State House, and Republicans control 100.

== Pennsylvania ballot measures ==
No statewide ballot measures are on the November 3, 2026 ballot.

== See also ==
- Elections in Pennsylvania
- Politics of Pennsylvania
- Political party strength in Pennsylvania
