= Oklahoma State Election Board =

Governing body regarding elections in Oklahoma

Oklahoma State Elections Board
- Great Seal of Oklahoma

Agency overview
- Headquarters: Oklahoma State Capitol Oklahoma City, Oklahoma
- Employees: 23 classified 1 unclassified
- Annual budget: $8 million
- Ministers responsible: Benjamin Lepak, Secretary of State; Steve Curry, Chair of the Board
- Agency executive: Paul Ziriax, Secretary of the Board
- Website: Oklahoma State Elections Board

The Oklahoma State Election Board is the governing body regarding elections in the state of Oklahoma. The Board is responsible for maintaining uniformly in the application, operation and interpretation of State and Federal election laws. Additionally, the Board is responsible for promoting and encouraging the citizens of Oklahoma to register to vote and participate in all elections by providing educational programs to raise citizen awareness about voting privileges and about the services available to them.

The Board is composed of three members appointed by the Governor of Oklahoma with the advice and consent of the Oklahoma Senate to serve four year terms. Under the State Election Board are the county election boards and precinct election boards.

== State Election Board ==
=== Membership ===
Membership is based on statewide voter registration. Based on the most recent January 1 voter registration report, the state central committee of the political party with the largest number of registered voters submits to the Governor a list of ten nominees. The state central committee of the political party having the second largest number of registered voters submits to the Governor a list of five nominees. Based on the names submitted, the Governor appoints two members from the largest party and one member from the second largest party.

All regular appointments must be made by no later than March 1 every four years. If a political party fails to submit a list of candidates, the Governor may appoint anyone of that party to the position.

=== Officers ===
On the first Monday of April every four years, the members of the Board elect from among themselves a Chair and Vice Chair. Each serves a four-year term.

=== Vacancies ===
In the event of a vacancy due to death or resignation of a member of the Board, the Governor must, within thirty days of the vacancy, appoint with the advice and consent of the Senate, a member of the same party to fill the unexpired term. The political party’s state central committee must submit a list of five nominees for the Governor to nominate from.

If a member of the Board fails to attend five consecutive meetings of the Board or when a member changes his party affiliation, that member's seat on the Board is declared vacant. The vacancy is filled in the same manner as other vacancies.

=== Current Membership ===
- Heather Mahieu Cline of Oklahoma City, Oklahoma,
- Mignon Lambley of Hooker, Oklahoma,
- Dr. Tim Mauldin of Norman, Oklahoma

=== Secretary of the State Election Board ===
The Secretary of the State Election Board is the chief administrative officer of the State Election Board.

The Secretary has general supervisory authority over all county election boards and has the authority to provide administrative supervision to any county election board. Such authority extends to stand in the place of the secretary of any county election board for the purpose of employing county election board personnel when a vacancy exists in the office of the secretary of the county election board.

The Secretary has the authority to employ and fix the salaries and duties of such personnel as may be necessary to perform the duties of the State Election Board. The Secretary may issue, repeal or modify such rules or regulations as the Secretary deems necessary to facilitate and assist in achieving and maintaining uniformity in the application, operation and interpretation of the state and federal election laws and a maximum degree of correctness, impartiality and efficiency in administration of the election laws.

The Secretary is the chief promoter and encourager of voter registration and voter participation in the elections of the state. Also, the Secretary is the chief state election official responsible for coordination of state responsibilities under the National Voter Registration Act of 1993 and Help America Vote Act of 2002. This grants the Secretary the authority to implement programs for confirmation of voter registration and for removal of ineligible voters.

The Secretary of the State Election Board also serves as the Secretary of the State Senate, and is elected by the State Senate.

The current Secretary is Paul Ziriax.

== County Election Boards ==
Each of Oklahoma’s 77 counties has a three-member county election board composed of two political members and the secretary of county election board as the at-large member. The county election boards are responsible to the State Election Board for governing elections within their county.

=== Appointment ===
The State Election Board appoints two members of each county election board, and two alternates, to serve terms of four years each beginning May 1 every four years. By no later than April 15, the county central committees of the two political parties with the largest number of registered voters in the state, based upon the latest January 15 registration report, must each submit to the State Election Board a nominee for membership on the county election board and a nominee to serve as the alternate. The State Election Board is confined to the nominees submitted in making appointments.

If a county central committee fails to submit nominees by April 15, the State Election Board appoints a member and alternate to the county election board from any member of such party within the county. Alternates shall serve on the county election board at any meeting that the member for whom the person is an alternate is unable to attend.

=== Officers ===
On the first Monday in June every four years, the county election board must elect a chairman and vice chairman. The secretary is prohibited from serving as the chairman or vice chairman but still is a full voting member of the county election board. However, the State Election Board has the authority to remove any chairman or vice chairman of any county election board at any time. This does not terminate their membership on the county election board.

=== Vacancies ===
In the event of a vacancy, the State Election Board must, within sixty days of the vacancy, appoint a member of the same party to fill the unexpired term, based on a nomination submitted by the party's county central committee within thirty days after the vacancy occurs. Should a county central committee fail to submit a nominee, the State Election Board may appoint any member of the party within the county to the county election board.

Vacancies occur when a member fails to attend five consecutive meetings of the board or when a member changes the member's party affiliation.

=== Secretaries of the County Election Boards ===
The State Election Board appoints the secretary of each county election board for a term of two years beginning on May 1. However, the State Election Board may remove the secretary of any county election board at any time.

The secretary of each county election board is the chief administrative officer of that county election board and has general supervisory authority over the several precinct election boards within the county. In counties with at least 17,500 registered voters, the secretary may employ an assistant secretary and such other employees as are necessary to perform the duties of the county election board. In counties having fewer than 17,500 registered voters, the secretary may employ a chief clerk and such other employees as are necessary to perform the duties of the county election board.

If a vacancy exists in the office of the secretary of the county election board, the Secretary of the State Election Board has the authority to stand in the place of the secretary of the county election board for the purpose of employing necessary county election board personnel.

The secretary of a county election board shall be charged with the operational responsibilities of the board, including, but not limited to, supervision, defining job positions and responsibilities of the employees, preparation of the annual budget, preparation and filing of all reports, and the implementation of policy, findings and actions lawfully prescribed or determined by the county election board.

== Precinct Election Board ==
Each precinct under a county election board is governed by a precinct election board composed of three members. Each precinct election board is responsible to the State Election Board through their county election board for governing all elections within their precinct.

=== Appointment ===
Each county election board appoints two members of each county election board to serve terms of four years each beginning July 1 every four years. By no later than June 15, the county central committees of the two political parties with the largest number of registered voters in the state, based upon the latest January 15 registration report, must each submit to their county election board a list of three nominees for membership on the county election board. The county election board is confined to the nominees submitted in making appointments.

If a county central committee fails to submit nominees by June 15, the county election board appoints a member to the precinct election board from any member of such party within the precinct.

=== Officers ===
The county election board shall designate one member of each precinct election board as judge and the other as clerk for each precinct to serve for a term of four years each. However, the county election board has the authority to remove any precinct judge or clerk at any time.

In anticipation of large numbers of voters in specific precincts at any election, the Secretary of the State Election Board may authorize the secretary of any county election board to appoint additional precinct election board members, in multiples of three, to assist the regular precinct election officials in processing voters. The Secretary of the State Election Board shall prescribe procedures to be used in such cases.

=== Counters ===
Counters for each precinct in each county shall be appointed by the county election board only as authorized by the State Election Board for any election. Insofar as is possible, no more than one-half of the counters in any precinct shall be members of the same party.

=== Inspectors of the Precinct Election Boards ===
Each county election board shall appoint the inspector for each precinct election board within the county. The board shall have the authority to remove any inspector in the county at any time. The inspector of each precinct election board serves as the chief administrative officer of the precinct election board.

== Restrictions on County and Precinct Election Board membership ==
To be eligible for membership on a county or precinct election board, an individual must be a registered voter of the county in which he will serve and demonstrate competence to perform his duties. Persons thus qualified and appointed are trained in their duties in a manner prescribed by the Secretary of the State Election Board.

Candidates for office or deputy or regular employees may not serve on a county election board, precinct election board or absentee voting board at any election.

=== Precinct Boards ===
People related within the third degree by either consanguinity or affinity to a candidate for office on the ballot in the precinct shall not serve on a precinct election board or absentee voting board at any election.

In the event a member of a precinct election board is disqualified, it is the duty of the secretary of the county election board to appoint a suitable replacement for the official for the election. Any person so disqualified must resign the office or position no later than ten days following the close of the filing period during which such candidacy was filed.

=== County Boards ===
A member of the county election board may not participate in or carry out any duties or functions associated with the office during any election if the member is related within the third degree to a candidate. In the event of such a contest or recount, the alternate for the member shall carry out the duties of the office during the actual conduct of the contest of candidacy or recount.

The Secretary of the State Election Board shall appoint a replacement for the secretary of the county election board to carry out the duties or functions of the office, including voting as a member of the county election board, if the secretary of the county election board is related within the third degree to a candidate.

== See also ==
- Elections in Oklahoma
