= 2026 Texas political party advisory election =

- March 3, 2026

Advisory questions were held in the U.S. state of Texas to gauge statewide primary voter sentiment about party positions. The Texas Democratic Party put thirteen questions to party primary voters, and the Republican Party of Texas put ten. The propositions' results likely will influence party platforms at both state conventions later in the year. The questions were nonbinding, and voters were only able to answer one slate of questions.

The questions were held alongside the state's primary elections.

== Democratic Party questions ==
Source for Democratic Party questions:

=== Proposition 1 ===
"Texas should expand Medicaid and ensure access to affordable healthcare for all."

Democrat Proposition 1
- "Texas should expand Medicaid and ensure access to affordable healthcare for all."

Results
Choice	Votes	%
Yes	2,217,168	97.40%
No	59,121	2.60%
County results
Yes
90–100%
80–90%
70–80%
50–60%

Proposition 1
Choice	Votes	%
For	2,217,168	97.40
Against	59,121	2.60
Total	2,276,289	100.00

=== Proposition 2 ===
"Texans should support humane and dignified immigration policies and pathways to citizenship."

Proposition 2
Choice	Votes	%
For	2,195,523	96.92
Against	69,854	3.08
Total	2,265,377	100.00

=== Proposition 3 ===
"Texans should have the right to make their own healthcare decisions, including reproductive rights."

Proposition 3
Choice	Votes	%
For	2,193,998	96.61
Against	77,034	3.39
Total	2,271,032	100.00

=== Proposition 4 ===
"Texas should address the state's housing crisis in affordability and access in both urban and rural communities."

Proposition 4
Choice	Votes	%
For	2,188,215	97.02
Against	67,158	2.98
Total	2,255,373	100.00

=== Proposition 5 ===
"Texas should fund all public schools at the same per-pupil rate as the national average."

Proposition 5
Choice	Votes	%
For	2,138,861	95.41
Against	102,783	4.59
Total	2,241,644	100.00

=== Proposition 6 ===
"Secure online voter registration should be accessible to all eligible Texas residents."

Proposition 6
Choice	Votes	%
For	2,144,392	95.02
Against	112,330	4.98
Total	2,256,722	100.00

=== Proposition 7 ===
"Texas should have a clean and healthy environment that includes water, air, and biodiversity. Texas must preserve the state's natural, cultural, scenic, and recreational resources."

Proposition 7
Choice	Votes	%
For	2,255,388	99.30
Against	15,907	0.70
Total	2,271,295	100.00

=== Proposition 8 ===
"Texas should legalize cannabis for adults and automatically expunge criminal records for past low-level cannabis offenses."

Proposition 8
Choice	Votes	%
For	1,785,836	80.13
Against	442,865	19.87
Total	2,228,701	100.00

=== Proposition 9 ===
"Texas should raise salaries to at least the national average and should provide a cost-of-living increase based on the national Consumer Price Index every two years to current/retired school and state employees."

Proposition 9
Choice	Votes	%
For	2,154,859	95.72
Against	96,451	4.28
Total	2,251,310	100.00

=== Proposition 10 ===
"Texas should ban racially motivated redistricting, ban mid-decade redistricting, and create a non-partisan redistricting board to redraw lines every 10 years."

Proposition 10
Choice	Votes	%
For	2,140,641	95.77
Against	94,647	4.23
Total	2,235,288	100.00

=== Proposition 11 ===
The Working Class should be eligible for greater federal income tax relief and have their tax burden fairly shifted onto the wealthiest."

Proposition 11
Choice	Votes	%
For	2,133,411	95.22
Against	107,016	4.78
Total	2,240,427	100.00

=== Proposition 12 ===
"Texas should expand accessible public transportation opportunities in rural and urban communities so residents can get to their workplaces, schools, and healthcare."

Proposition 12
Choice	Votes	%
For	2,150,067	95.69
Against	96,947	4.31
Total	2,247,014	100.00

=== Proposition 13 ===
"Texas should prevent individuals with a history of domestic abuse from purchasing firearms by implementing "red flag" laws."

Proposition 13
Choice	Votes	%
For	2,195,003	96.99
Against	68,150	3.01
Total	2,263,153	100.00

== Republican Party questions ==
Source for Republican Party questions:

=== Proposition 1 ===
"Texas property taxes should be assessed at the purchase price and phased out entirely over the next six years through spending reductions."

Proposition 1
Choice	Votes	%
For	1,869,381	87.98
Against	255,471	12.02
Total	2,124,852	100.00

=== Proposition 2 ===
"Texas should require any local government budget that raises property taxes to be approved by voters at a November general election."

Proposition 2
Choice	Votes	%
For	2,022,664	93.72
Against	135,476	6.28
Total	2,158,140	100.00

=== Proposition 3 ===
Republican Proposition 3
- "Texas should prohibit denial of healthcare or any medical service based solely on the patient's vaccination status."

Results
Choice	Votes	%
Yes	1,571,776	73.20%
No	575,531	26.80%
Valid votes	2,147,307	100.00%
Invalid or blank votes	0	0.00%
Total votes	2,147,307	100.00%
Registered voters/turnout	18,657,918	11.51%
- County results Yes: 50–60% 60–70% 70–80% 80–90% No: 50–60%

"Texas should prohibit denial of healthcare or any medical service based solely on the patient's vaccination status."

Proposition 3
Choice	Votes	%
For	1,571,776	73.20
Against	575,531	26.80
Total	2,147,307	100.00

=== Proposition 4 ===
"Texas should require its public schools to teach that life begins at fertilization."

Proposition 4
Choice	Votes	%
For	1,814,387	84.76
Against	326,263	15.24
Total	2,140,650	100.00

=== Proposition 5 ===
"Texas should ban gender, sexuality, and reproductive clinics and services in K-12 schools."

Proposition 5
Choice	Votes	%
For	1,951,370	90.56
Against	203,455	9.44
Total	2,154,825	100.00

=== Proposition 6 ===
"Texas should enact term limits on all elected officials."

Proposition 6
Choice	Votes	%
For	1,959,673	91.09
Against	191,789	8.91
Total	2,151,462	100.00

=== Proposition 7 ===
"Texas should ban the large-scale export or sale of our groundwater and surface water to any single private or public entity."

Proposition 7
Choice	Votes	%
For	1,975,511	93.15
Against	145,308	6.85
Total	2,120,819	100.00

=== Proposition 8 ===
"The Texas Legislature should reduce the burden of illegal immigration on taxpayers by ending public services for illegal aliens."

Proposition 8
Choice	Votes	%
For	1,995,740	92.60
Against	159,461	7.40
Total	2,155,201	100.00

=== Proposition 9 ===
"The Republican-controlled Texas Legislature should stop awarding leadership positions, including committee and subcommittee chairmanships and vice chairmanships, to Democrats."

Proposition 9
Choice	Votes	%
For	1,668,963	78.91
Against	445,935	21.09
Total	2,114,898	100.00

=== Proposition 10 ===
"Texas should prohibit Sharia Law."

Republican Proposition 10
- "Texas should prohibit Sharia Law."

Results
Choice	Votes	%
Yes	1,992,658	94.76%
No	110,211	5.24%
County results
Yes
90–100%
80–90%

Proposition 10
Choice	Votes	%
For	1,992,658	94.76
Against	110,211	5.24
Total	2,102,869	100.00
