= Elections in Maine =

Election results in Maine comprise voting for local, gubernatorial and federal public offices, members of the state legislature, as well as ballot measures. Congressional elections are held every even year (2012, 2014, 2016), and gubernatorial ones every off-presidential even year (2010, 2014, 2018).

The results of the elections are often varied. Maine is seen as a swing state, with unusually high support for independent candidates. The Republican Party has won Maine in 11 out of the past 20 presidential elections, and the governorship has been won by Democrats and independents three times each, and Republicans four times, since 1974. Although today Maine is considered somewhat Democratic in presidential elections having voted Democratic in every presidential election since 1992. While the governorship remains competitive, Republicans have held both houses of the state legislature simultaneously for only two years since 1974.

Maine has used the congressional district method for allocating electors in presidential elections continuously since the 1972 election. Despite this, the party that won the largest part of the state vote won all the congressional districts every time, until 2016, when Democratic nominee Hillary Clinton won all but the 2nd district, which she lost to Republican Donald Trump, who later went on to win the election. Trump would win the district again in 2020 and 2024, despite again losing the state both times.

Maine was the first state to introduce ranked choice voting in elections, and became the first to use it in a presidential election, in 2020.

In a 2020 study, Maine was ranked as the 14th easiest state for citizens to vote in.

== Voting method ==
Maine used the first-past-the-post voting system for all elections until 2017, when it was replaced with ranked choice voting upon enactment of the Ranked Choice Voting Act, which had previously been approved by voters in a referendum on November 8th, 2016. The system was first used on June 12, 2018, in the primaries for the 2018 United States elections, and Maine became the first state to use ranked choice voting in a federal election on November 6, 2018, when it was used in the main election itself.

Since its enactment, numerous attempts have been made to repeal the act, or delay its effects. After the act was passed in 2016, legislators voted for the suspension of the law until December 2021, thus making it inoperative until the 2022 United States elections. This was subsequently vetoed by voters, who gathered enough signatures on a petition to allow the system to be used. The state's senate took legal action to attempt to disallow the petition, but the Maine Supreme Court issued a ruling enabling ranked choice voting to be used in the 2018 election. The Maine Republican Party also attempted to block the use of the system in the 2020 United States elections via legal action, but the Maine Supreme Court dismissed the suit, allowing Maine to become the first state to use ranked choice voting in a presidential election.

== See also ==
- 2020 Maine elections
- 2026 Maine elections
- Maine § Law and government
- United States presidential elections in Maine
- As Maine goes, so goes the nation
- Governor of Maine § Elections and terms of office
- Electoral reform in Maine
- Women's suffrage in Maine
- Elections in New England
