= 2026 Alabama elections =

Elections in the U.S. state of Alabama in 2026

- November 3, 2026

A general election was held in the U.S. state of Alabama on November 3, 2026. Primary elections took place on May 19, 2026.

== Primary elections ==
Primary elections take place in Alabama when more than one candidate in one of the two major parties files to run for an office. Candidate qualifying for the Alabama Republican Party officially opened on January 5, 2026, and closed on January 23.

== Federal offices ==
=== United States Senate ===
One-term incumbent Tommy Tuberville is retiring to run for governor.

== State offices ==
=== Governor ===
Two-term incumbent governor Kay Ivey is term-limited and cannot seek re-election.

=== Lieutenant governor ===
Two-term incumbent lieutenant governor Will Ainsworth is term-limited and cannot seek re-election.

=== Attorney general ===
Two-term incumbent attorney general Steve Marshall is term-limited and cannot seek re-election.

=== Secretary of State ===
One-term incumbent Secretary of State Wes Allen is retiring to run for lieutenant governor.

=== State Treasurer ===
Four-term incumbent treasurer Young Boozer is running for re-election.

=== State Auditor ===
One-term incumbent auditor Andrew Sorrell initially said he was retiring to run for secretary of state, but in January 2026 announced that he was instead running for reelection.

=== Commissioner of Agriculture and Industries ===
Two-term incumbent commissioner Rick Pate is term-limited and cannot seek re-election.

=== Board of Education ===
Five of nine seats on the Alabama State Board of Education are up for election.

=== Public Service Commission ===
Two seats on the Alabama Public Service Commission are up for election.

=== State legislative ===
==== House of Representatives ====
All 105 seats in the Alabama House of Representatives are up for election.

==== Senate ====
All 35 seats in the Alabama Senate are up for election.

==== Special elections ====
- House District 63, incumbent Cynthia Almond resigned after being appointed as the president of the Alabama Public Service Commission

=== Judicial ===
==== Supreme Court ====
Three justices are up for election on the Supreme Court of Alabama.

==== Appellate courts ====
Two justices are up for election on both the Alabama Court of Civil Appeals and the Alabama Court of Criminal Appeals

== Ballot measures ==
Any ballot measures need to be approved by the Alabama House of Representatives and the Alabama Senate. One ballot measure currently certified is the Add to List of Non-Bailable Offenses Amendment. The amendment numbers will be certified closer to the election date.

== Local ==
Local municipal elections took place on August 25, 2026.
