= 2026 Guam elections =

- August 1, 2026 (primary); November 3, 2026 (general)

The 2026 Guam elections were held in the U.S. territory of Guam on November 3, 2026, as part of the 2026 United States elections. The primary were held on August 1, 2026.

== Federal ==
=== United States House of Representatives ===
Incumbent James Moylan ran for reelection. He was defeated by Alicia Limtiaco.

== Executive ==
=== Consolidated Commission on Utilities ===
==== Results ====
2026 Consolidated Commission on Utilities results
| Party | Candidate | Votes | % |
|---|---|---|---|
| Nonpartisan | Simon A. Sanchez II (incumbent) | 14,624 | 24.11 |
| Nonpartisan | Michael Troy Limtiaco (incumbent) | 13,773 | 22.71 |
| Nonpartisan | Francis E. Santos (incumbent) | 12,408 | 20.46 |
| Nonpartisan | Kenneth Robert Perez | 10,369 | 17.09 |
| Nonpartisan | Roy Salvador Agudon Adonay | 9,323 | 15.37 |
| Write-in | | 160 | 0.26 |
| Total votes | | 60,657 | 100.00 |

=== Guam Education Board ===
==== Results ====
2026 Guam Education Board results
| Party | Candidate | Votes | % |
|---|---|---|---|
| Nonpartisan | John R. Taitano II | 14,791 | 32.34 |
| Nonpartisan | Ronald Lewis McNinch Jr. (incumbent) | 12,503 | 27.34 |
| Nonpartisan | Isaiah John Aguon | 10,251 | 22.42 |
| Nonpartisan | Ronald Anthony Ayuyu | 8,186 | 17.90 |
| Total votes | | 45,731 | 100.00 |
