= 2026 Indiana elections =

US state elections

- May 5, 2026 (primary); November 3, 2026 (general)

The 2026 Indiana elections were held in the U.S. state of Indiana on November 3, 2026, as part of the 2026 United States elections. The primaries took place on May 5, 2026.

== Federal offices ==
=== United States House of Representatives ===
- 2026 United States House of Representatives elections in Indiana

== Statewide offices ==
=== Secretary of State ===
- 2026 Indiana Secretary of State election

=== Treasurer ===
- 2026 Indiana State Treasurer election

=== Indiana State Auditor ===
- 2026 Indiana State Comptroller election

=== State Legislature ===
- 2026 Indiana House of Representatives election
- 2026 Indiana Senate election

=== Indiana Judicial Retention ===
- 2026 Indiana judicial retention elections

=== Indiana Ballot Measures ===
- 2026 Indiana ballot measures
