= 2026 San Francisco Proposition B =

- June 2, 2026
- Term Limits for Mayor and Board of Supervisors Charter Amendment

Results
Choice	Votes	%
Yes	132,083	53.02%
No	117,016	46.98%
Valid votes	249,099	91.88%
Invalid or blank votes	22,000	8.12%
Total votes	271,099	100.00%
Registered voters/turnout	533,546	50.81%
Unofficial results by county supervisorial district (Note: As of June 12, 2026, at 4:28 PM PDT)
Yes
60–70%
50–60%
No
50–60%

Proposition B, (Note: Sometimes referred to as Measure B) officially the Term Limits for Mayor and Board of Supervisors Charter Amendment, is a legislatively referred measure that appeared on the June 2, 2026, ballot in San Francisco, California.

The measure, which sought to establish lifetime term limits of two four-year terms for San Francisco's mayor and board of supervisors, was approved by voters in a 53% to 47% vote, making San Francisco the first city in California to impose lifetime term limits.

== Background and impact ==
Prior to the passing of Proposition B, San Francisco used consecutive term limits, where the city's mayor and supervisorial board were able to serve two consecutive four-year terms, leave office for four years, and then run for their respective position again.

Proposition B will implement stricter lifetime term limits, prohibiting former elected officials from running for the same office after serving two consecutive four-year terms.

Opponents argued that the measure's wording specifically targeted Aaron Peskin, a former supervisor and the only elected official in San Francisco to return to office after serving two consecutive terms and waiting four years.

== Endorsements ==
Yes

U.S. representatives

- Kevin Mullin, CA-15 (2023–present) (Democratic)
- Nancy Pelosi, former speaker of the House (2007–2011, 2019–2023) from CA-11 (1987–present) (Democratic)

State legislators

- Scott Wiener, SD-11 (2016–present) (Democratic)

Local officials

- Matt Dorsey, supervisor from the 6th district (2022–present) (Democratic)
- Jackie Fielder, supervisor from the 9th district (2025–present) (Democratic)
- Daniel Lurie, mayor of San Francisco (2025–present) (Democratic)
- Bilal Mahmood, supervisor from the 5th district (2025–present) (Democratic)
- Myrna Melgar, supervisor from the 7th district (2021–present) (Democratic)
- Danny Sauter, supervisor from the 3rd district (2025–present) (Democratic)
- Stephen Sherrill, supervisor from the 2nd district (2024–present) (Democratic)
- Alan Wong, supervisor from the 4th district (2025–present) (Democratic)

Individuals

- Honey Mahogany, drag performer (Democratic)

Organizations

- Alice B. Toklas LGBTQ Democratic Club
- Blueprint SF
- GrowSF
- sf.citi

Political parties

- San Francisco Democratic Party
No

Statewide officials

- Jerry Brown, former governor of California (1975–1983, 2011–2019) (Democratic)

State legislators

- Tom Ammiano, former AD-17 (2008–2014) (Democratic)
- Quentin Kopp, former SD-08 (1986–1998) (Independent)
- Mark Leno, former SD-11 (2008–2016) (Democratic)

Local officials

- Art Agnos, former mayor of San Francisco (1988–1992) (Democratic)
- Michela Alioto-Pier, former supervisor from the 2nd district (2004–2011) (Democratic)
- Willie Brown, former mayor of San Francisco (1996–2004) (Democratic)
- Connie Chan, supervisor from the 1st district (2021–present) (Democratic)
- Chyanne Chen, supervisor from the 11th district (2025–present) (Democratic)
- Bevan Dufty, former supervisor from the 8th district (2002–2011) (Democratic)
- Sandra Lee Fewer, former supervisor from the 1st district (2017–2021) (Democratic)
- Rafael Mandelman, president of the Board of Supervisors (2025–present) from the 8th district (2018–present) (Democratic)
- Aaron Peskin, former supervisor from the 3rd district (2001–2009, 2015–2025) (Democratic)
- Shamann Walton, supervisor from the 10th district (2019–present) (Democratic)
- Norman Yee, former supervisor from the 7th district (2013–2021) (Democratic)

Labor unions

- International Association of Fire Fighters Local 798
- San Francisco Labor Council
- SEIU Local 1021
- UNITE HERE Local 2

Organizations

- Harvey Milk LGBTQ Democratic Club
- League of Women Voters of San Francisco
- San Francisco Bay Area Planning and Urban Research Association

Political parties

- San Francisco Green Party
- San Francisco Republican Party

Newspapers

- Bay Area Reporter
- San Francisco Bay Guardian
- San Francisco Chronicle
- San Francisco Examiner

== Results ==
2026 San Francisco Proposition B
Choice	Votes	%
For	132,083	53.02
Against	117,016	46.98
Total	249,099	100.00
Valid votes	249,099	91.88
Invalid/blank votes	22,000	8.12
Total votes	271,099	100.00
Registered voters/turnout	533,546	50.81
