= 2026 University of Nebraska Board of Regents election =

- November 3, 2026

3 of 8 seats on the University of Nebraska Board of Regents 5 seats needed for a majority
	First party	Second party	Third party
Party	Republican	Democratic	Nonpartisan
Seats before	6	2	0
Seats after	4	2	2
Seat change	▼2	Steady	▲2

The 2026 University of Nebraska Board of Regents election was held on November 3, 2026, to elect three of eight voting members of the University of Nebraska Board of Regents. Primary elections were held on May 12. The election is officially nonpartisan, but candidates may affiliate with a political party.

== District 1 ==
=== Primary election ===
==== Candidates ====
===== Advanced to general election =====
- Brent Comstock, entrepreneur (Nonpartisan)
- Jeremy Hosein, neurosurgeon (Republican)

===== Eliminated in primary =====
- Roland Nance

===== Withdrawn =====
- Brian Maher, Nebraska Department of Education Commissioner (Republican)

===== Declined =====
- Tim Clare, incumbent regent (Republican)

==== Endorsements ====
Brent Comstock

Political parties

- Nebraska Democratic Party

==== Results ====
Nonpartisan primary
Candidate	Votes	%
Brent Comstock	20,772	55.3
Jeremy Hosein	13,913	37.1
Roland Nance	2,846	7.6
Total votes	37,531	100.0

=== General election ===
==== Results ====
2026 University of Nebraska Board of Regents election, district 1
Candidate	Votes	%
Brent Comstock	39,454	57.17
Jeremy Hosein	29,559	42.83
Total votes	69,013	100.00

== District 2 ==
=== Primary election ===
==== Candidates ====
===== Advanced to general election =====
- Elizabeth Butler, Omaha city clerk (Nonpartisan)
- Jill Wolfe, retired dietitian (Republican)

===== Declined =====
- Jack Stark, incumbent regent (Republican)

==== Endorsements ====
Elizabeth Butler

Political parties

- Nebraska Democratic Party

==== Results ====
Nonpartisan primary
Candidate	Votes	%
Elizabeth Butler	20,895	57.5
Jill Wolfe	15,410	42.5
Total votes	36,305	100.0

=== General election ===
==== Results ====
2026 University of Nebraska Board of Regents election, district 2
Candidate	Votes	%
Elizabeth Butler	45,140	54.74
Jill Wolfe	37,330	45.26
Total votes	82,470	100.00

== District 4 (special) ==
Elizabeth O'Connor resigned in early 2026. Former college football player Joel Makovicka was appointed to the position.

=== Primary election ===
==== Candidates ====
===== Advanced to general election =====
- Susanne Shore, first lady of Nebraska (2015–2023) (Democratic)
- Justin Solomon, former University of Nebraska–Lincoln student regent (Democratic)

===== Eliminated in primary =====
- Larry Bradley, perennial candidate (Democratic)
- Jim Rogers, candidate in 2024 (Democratic) (Note: Registered as a Republican during his 2024 campaign))
- Michael Skocz, University of Nebraska Omaha employee (Democratic)

===== Declined =====
- Joel Makovicka, incumbent board member

==== Endorsements ====
Susanne Shore

U.S. senators

- Pete Ricketts, U.S. senator from Nebraska (2023–present) (Republican; candidate's husband)
Justin Solomon

State legislators

- Dunixi Guereca, state legislator from the 7th district (2025–present)

==== Results ====
Nonpartisan primary
Candidate	Votes	%
Susanne Shore	9,846	34.8
Justin Solomon	7,042	24.8
Larry Bradley	5,763	20.3
Jim Rodgers	4,302	15.2
Michael Skocz	1,391	4.9
Total votes	28,344	100.0

=== General election ===
==== Post-primary endorsements ====
Justin Solomon

State legislators

- Terrell McKinney, state legislator from the 11th district (2021–present)
- Victor Rountree, state legislator from the 3rd district (2025–present)
- Tony Vargas, former state legislator from the 7th district (2017–2025)

==== Results ====
2026 University of Nebraska Board of Regents election, district 4
Candidate	Votes	%
Justin Solomon	31,586	61.10
Susanne Shore	20,109	38.90
Total votes	51,695	100.00
