= 2026 Louisiana Supreme Court election =

- May 16, 2026

The 2026 Louisiana Supreme Court election was held on May 16, 2026, to elect one of seven justices to the Louisiana Supreme Court. May 16 is the primary election date, however the winner in that race will be elected without appearing on the general election ballot in November. Two other justices were re-elected without appearing on the ballot as no one filed to run against them.

== District 1 ==
=== Republican primary ===
==== Candidates ====
===== Nominee =====
- William Burris, judge of the 22nd district court

===== Eliminated in primary =====
- Blair Edwards, judge of the 1st district court

==== Results ====
Republican primary
Party	Candidate	Votes	%
Republican	William Burris	39,490	57.72
Republican	Blair Edwards	28,926	42.28
Total votes		68,416	100.00

== District 3 ==
As the only candidate that filed, incumbent justice Cade Cole was re-elected without appearing on the ballot.

== District 4 ==
As the only candidate that filed, incumbent justice Jay McCallum was re-elected without appearing on the ballot.
