= 2026 District of Columbia elections =

Elections in Washington, D.C., in 2026

- November 3, 2026

A general election was held in Washington, D.C. on November 3, 2026, to elect various local and federal government officials. Primary elections were held on June 16, 2026.

== Federal offices ==
=== Non-voting delegate ===
Incumbent Democratic non-voting delegate Eleanor Holmes Norton is not running for a 19th consecutive two-year term.

=== Shadow senator ===
Incumbent Democratic shadow senator Paul Strauss is eligible to run for re-election to a sixth consecutive four-year term.

=== Shadow representative ===
Incumbent Democratic shadow representative Oye Owolewa is retiring.

== City offices ==
=== Mayor ===
Incumbent Democratic mayor Muriel Bowser had previously expressed interest in running for a fourth consecutive four-year term. On November 25, 2025, Bowser announced her intention not to seek re-election, saying ”it was time for me to pass the baton onto the next set of leaders who are going to take our city to the next level.”

=== Attorney General ===
Incumbent Attorney General Brian Schwalb is running for a second consecutive four-year term.

=== Council ===
Seven of thirteen seats on the Council of the District of Columbia are up for election in 2026.

=== State Board of Education ===
Four of eight seats on the District of Columbia State Board of Education are up for election in 2026.

== Party offices ==
The District of Columbia Democratic State Committee was up for election in June 2026.
