= 2026 Santa Clara County District Attorney election =

Local election in California

- June 2, 2026
| Candidate | Jeff Rosen | Daniel Chung |
| Party | Nonpartisan | Nonpartisan |
| Popular vote | 206,686 | 145,181 |
| Percentage | 58.7% | 41.3% |
district attorney before election
Jeff Rosen
Elected district attorney
Jeff Rosen

The 2026 Santa Clara County District Attorney election was held on June 2, 2026, to elect the district attorney of Santa Clara County, California. Incumbent district attorney Jeff Rosen was re-elected.

== Candidates ==
=== Declared ===
- Daniel Chung, assistant district attorney and runner-up in 2022
- Jeff Rosen, incumbent district attorney

== Campaign ==
When Chung first entered the race, Rosen stripped Chung of his responsibilities in his role as assistant district attorney, though he still received a salary. Chung received over $200,000 annually. While campaigning, Chung focused on a ruling by the Supreme Court of California that disqualified Rosen from retrying pro-Palestine activists who were involved in a Stanford University office takeover two years prior. The court ruled that Rosen compromised his neutrality when he referenced that case at a campaign fundraiser.

== Endorsements ==
Daniel Chung

Organizations

- CAIR Action
Jeff Rosen

U.S. senators

- Adam Schiff, California (2024–present)

U.S. representatives

- Ro Khanna, CA-17 (2017–present)
- 5 other U.S. representatives

State legislators

- 7 state legislators

Local officials

- Matt Mahan, mayor of San Jose (2023–present)
- 4 county supervisors

Organizations

- SEIU Local 521

Newspapers

- Los Altos Town Crier

== Results ==
2026 Santa Clara County District Attorney election
| Candidate | Votes | % |
|---|---|---|
| Jeff Rosen (incumbent) | 206,286 | 58.74 |
| Daniel Chung | 145,181 | 41.26 |
| Total votes | 351,867 | 100.00 |
