= 2026 Douglas County, Nebraska, elections =

2026 Nebraska local election

2026 Douglas County elections
- November 3, 2026

A general election was held in Douglas County, Nebraska, on November 3, 2026, to elect various county-level positions. Primary elections were held on May 12.

== County Attorney ==
=== Republican primary ===
==== Candidates ====
===== Nominee =====
- Don Kleine, incumbent attorney

=== Democratic primary ===
==== Candidates ====
===== Nominee =====
- Makayla Danner, City of Omaha prosecutor

===== Eliminated in primary =====
- Amy Jacobsen, former deputy county attorney

==== Results ====
Democratic primary
Party	Candidate	Votes	%
Democratic	Makayla Danner	27,335	52.11
Democratic	Amy Jacobsen	24,906	47.48
Write-in		213	0.41
Total votes		52,454	100.00

=== General election ===
==== Results ====
2026 Douglas County Attorney election
Party	Candidate	Votes	%
Democratic	Makayla Danner	110,063	52.80
Republican	Don Kleine (incumbent)	98,134	47.08
Write-in		265	0.13
Total votes		208,462	100.00

== County Assessor-Register of Deeds ==
Republican assessor-register Walt Peffer was elected unopposed in 2022, but died in office in January 2025. Michael Goodwillie was appointed to replace him.

=== Democratic primary ===
==== Candidates ====
===== Nominee =====
- Dakotah Smith, real estate broker

==== Endorsements ====
Dakotah Smith

Local officials

- John Ewing Jr., mayor of Omaha (2025–present)

=== General election ===
==== Results ====
2026 Douglas County Assessor-Register of Deeds election
Party	Candidate	Votes	%
Democratic	Dakotah Smith	150,143	95.40
Write-in		7,247	4.60
Total votes		157,390	100.00

== Clerk of the District Court ==
=== Democratic primary ===
==== Candidates ====
===== Nominee =====
- Justin Wayne, former state legislator from the 13th district (2017–2025)

===== Eliminated in primary =====
- Tom Barrett

===== Declined =====
- Crystal Rhoades, incumbent clerk (running for U.S. House)

==== Results ====
Democratic primary
Party	Candidate	Votes	%
Democratic	Justin Wayne	31,673	61.77
Democratic	Tom Barrett	19,456	37.94
Write-in		150	0.29
Total votes		51,279	100.00

=== General election ===
==== Results ====
2026 Douglas County Clerk of the District Court election
Party	Candidate	Votes	%
Democratic	Justin Wayne	149,956	95.46
Write-in		7,130	4.54
Total votes		157,086	100.00

== County Engineer ==
=== Republican primary ===
==== Candidates ====
===== Nominee =====
- Todd Pfitzer, incumbent engineer

=== General election ===
==== Results ====
2026 Douglas County Engineer election
Party	Candidate	Votes	%
Republican	Todd Pfitzer	134,944	92.60
Write-in		10,781	7.40
Total votes		145,725	100.00

== Sheriff ==
=== Republican primary ===
==== Candidates ====
===== Nominee =====
- Aaron Hanson, incumbent sheriff

=== Democratic primary ===
==== Candidates ====
===== Nominee =====
- Mark Martinez, former U.S. Marshal

=== General election ===
==== Results ====
2026 Douglas County Sheriff election
Party	Candidate	Votes	%
Democratic	Mark Martinez	112,599	54.47
Republican	Aaron Hanson (incumbent)	93,859	45.40
Write-in		271	0.13
Total votes		206,729	100.00

== County Treasurer ==
=== Democratic primary ===
==== Candidate ====
===== Nominee =====
- Tony Vargas, former state legislator from the 7th district (2017–2025), and nominee for Nebraska's 2nd congressional district in 2022 and 2024

===== Eliminated in primary =====
- Christian Espinosa Torres, assistant director of Omaha's Human Rights and Relations Department

==== Results ====
Democratic primary
Party	Candidate	Votes	%
Democratic	Tony Vargas	45,086	80.78
Democratic	Christian Espinosa Torres	10,614	19.02
Write-in		110	0.20
Total votes		55,810	100.00

=== General election ===
==== Results ====
2026 Douglas County Treasurer election
Party	Candidate	Votes	%
Democratic	Tony Vargas	147,719	94.18
Write-in		9,129	5.82
Total votes		156,848	100.00

== County Commission ==
=== District 2 ===
==== Democratic primary ====
===== Candidates =====
====== Nominee ======
- Whitney Hansen

====== Eliminated in primary ======
- James Cavanaugh, incumbent commissioner

===== Results =====
Democratic primary
Party	Candidate	Votes	%
Democratic	Whitney Hansen	4,636	51.68
Democratic	James Cavanaugh (incumbent)	4,310	48.04
Write-in		25	0.28
Total votes		8,791	100.00

==== General election ====
===== Results =====
2026 Douglas County Commission election, district 2
Party	Candidate	Votes	%
Democratic	Whitney Hansen	21,754	96.31
Write-in		834	3.69
Total votes		22,588	100.00

=== District 4 ===
==== Republican primary ====
===== Candidates =====
====== Nominee ======
- P.J. Morgan, incumbent commissioner

====== Eliminated in primary ======
- Chris Chappelear

===== Results =====
Republican primary
Party	Candidate	Votes	%
Republican	P.J. Morgan (incumbent)	5,989	68.70
Republican	Chris Chappelear	2,709	31.07
Write-in		20	0.23
Total votes		8,718	100.00

==== General election ====
===== Results =====
2026 Douglas County Commission election, district 4
Party	Candidate	Votes	%
Republican	P.J. Morgan (incumbent)	26,317	94.39
Write-in		1,563	5.61
Total votes		27,880	100.00

=== District 6 ===
==== Republican primary ====
===== Candidates =====
====== Nominee ======
- Tim Donahue

====== Eliminated in primary ======
- Colleen Brennan

====== Declined ======
- Mary Ann Borgeson, incumbent commissioner

===== Results =====
Republican primary
Party	Candidate	Votes	%
Republican	Tim Donahue	5,135	57.37
Republican	Colleen Brennan	3,040	42.18
Write-in		32	0.44
Total votes		7,207	100.00

==== Democratic primary ====
===== Candidates =====
====== Nominee ======
- John McCann

==== General election ====
===== Results =====
2026 Douglas County Commission election, district 6
Party	Candidate	Votes	%
Republican	Tim Donahue	20,175	55.57
Democratic	John McCann	16,089	44.32
Write-in		39	0.11
Total votes		36,303	100.00
