= Elections in Oklahoma =

Elections in the State of Oklahoma are established by the Oklahoma Constitution in Section 1 of Article 3. They are governed by the Oklahoma State Election Board.

In a 2020 study, Oklahoma was ranked as the 14th hardest state for citizens to vote in.

== Constitution provisions ==
All elections shall be free and equal. No power, civil or military, shall ever interfere to prevent the free exercise of the right of suffrage, and electors shall, in all cases, except for treason, felony, and breach of the peace, be privileged from arrest during their attendance on elections and while going to and from the same.

— Section 5, Article 3, the Oklahoma Constitution

== Voter qualifications ==
Subject to such exceptions as the Oklahoma Legislature may prescribe, all citizens of the United States, over the age of eighteen and who are residents of this state, may register to vote as a qualified elector of Oklahoma.

== Types of elections ==
=== General election ===
The general election for all elected state, district and country officers is held on the first Tuesday after the first Monday of November every two years. Those offices whose term expires the year following the general election must face election in that general election. For the statewide elected executive offices (the Governor of Oklahoma, Attorney General of Oklahoma, etc.), they must face election in the general election held two years after the last election for President of the United States. Thus, the most recent gubernatorial election was held in 2022, and the most recent presidential election was held in 2020,

Candidates for United States Senator and United States Representative are elected in the state general election occurring as their term expires.

=== Primary election ===
A primary election must be held for a political party to nominate its candidates for the offices to the filled at the next general election. Such primaries are held on the last Tuesday in June of each year in which a general election is to be held, unless it is a presidential preference primary, in which case it is the First Tuesday after the First Monday in March. No candidate's name may be printed on the general election ballot unless such candidate has been nominated by his political party by a primary election. However, nonpartisan candidates need not seek primary election nominations in order to appear on the general election ballot.

=== Runoff primary election ===
If at any primary election no candidate for the nomination for office of any political party receives a majority of all votes cast for all candidates of the party for the office, then the two candidates receiving the highest number of votes shall be placed on the official ballot as candidates for such nomination at a Runoff Primary Election to be held on the fourth Tuesday of August in the same year. The winner of the runoff primary shall be the political party's nomination for the office to be filled.

== Election provisions ==
=== Closed primaries ===
Oklahoma operates a modified closed primary system, in which only members of a given political party may vote in that party's primary and runoff primary elections. The system is "modified" in that the chairman of each political party may allow registered Independents to vote in that party's primary election, but is not required to do so. Moreover, should Independents be allowed to vote in a primary election, the Independent may not vote in more than one political party's primary elections.

The Oklahoma Democratic chairman recently did decide to allow registered Independents to vote in the Democratic primary.

=== Substitute candidates ===
In the event of the death of a political party's nominee for office prior to the date of the general election, a substitute candidate is permitted to have his name placed on the general election ballot. If the nominee was a candidate for a state office, the state central committee of the party affected must submit to the Secretary of the State Election Board of the name of an alternative candidate to be placed on the general election ballot. Such notice must be submitted in writing within five days after the death has occurred and must be signed by at least two members of the political party's state central committee.

If the death of the political party's nominee should occur five days or more following the Runoff Primary Election date, a special general election shall be called by the Governor of Oklahoma. For such special general election, the candidates for office are the substitute candidate named by the central committee, the nominee of other political parties nominated for office, and any previously filed independent candidates.

== Political parties ==
=== Party Recognition ===
A group of persons may form a recognized political party at any time except during the period between March 1 and November 15 of any even-numbered year if the following procedure is observed:

1. Notice of intent to form a recognized political party must be filed in writing with the Secretary of the State Election Board at any time except during the period between March 1 and November 15 of any even-numbered year;

2. After such notice is filed, petitions seeking recognition of a political party, in a form to be prescribed by the Secretary of the State Election Board, shall be filed with such Secretary, bearing the signatures of registered voters equal to at least 3% percent of the total votes cast in the last General Election for Governor. Each page of such petitions must contain the names of registered voters from a single county. Petitions may be circulated a maximum of one year after notice is filed, provided that petitions shall be filed with the Secretary no later than March 1 of an even-numbered year. Such petitions shall not be circulated between March 1 and November 15 of any even-numbered year; and

3. Within thirty days after receipt of such petitions, the State Election Board shall determine the sufficiency of such petitions. If such Board determines there are a sufficient number of valid signatures of registered voters, the party becomes recognized under the laws of the State of Oklahoma with all rights and obligations accruing thereto.

If a party's nominee for Governor, or nominees for electors for President and Vice President, fail to receive at least 2.5% percent of the total votes cast for said offices in the general election, that party's recognition automatically ceases, and that party must once again go through the process of gaining recognition.

=== Current recognized parties ===
- Democratic Party
- Republican Party
- Libertarian Party

=== Current active parties ===
- Green Party
- America's Independent Party of Oklahoma
- Constitution Party
- Pirate Party of Oklahoma

=== Current recognized organizations ===
- Americans Elect

== See also ==
- 2024 Oklahoma elections
- Elections in the United States
- Politics of Oklahoma
- Political party strength in Oklahoma
- United States presidential elections in Oklahoma
