= 1996 United States presidential election in Pennsylvania =

- November 5, 1996
- Turnout: 66.1%

Nominee	Bill Clinton	Bob Dole	Ross Perot
Party	Democratic	Republican	Reform
Home state	Arkansas	Kansas	Texas
Running mate	Al Gore	Jack Kemp	Patrick Choate
Electoral vote	23	0	0
Popular vote	2,215,819	1,801,169	430,984
Percentage	49.17%	39.97%	9.56%

Clinton
30–40%
40–50%
50–60%
60–70%
70–80%
80–90%
90–100%
Dole
30–40%
40–50%
50–60%
60–70%
70–80%
80–90%
90–100%
Perot
40–50%
Tie/No Votes
President before election
Bill Clinton
Democratic
Elected President
Bill Clinton
Democratic

The 1996 United States presidential election in Pennsylvania took place on November 5, 1996, as part of the 1996 United States presidential election. Voters chose 23 representatives, or electors to the Electoral College, who voted for president and vice president.

Pennsylvania was won by President Bill Clinton by a margin of 9.2%. Billionaire businessman Ross Perot (Reform Party of the United States of America-TX) finished in third, with 9.56% of the popular vote in Pennsylvania.

In Pennsylvania, Clinton received 49.2% of the vote, the same percentage as the national vote when rounded to the nearest tenth. Pennsylvania was also the tipping-point state in this election. As of the 2024 presidential election, this is the last election in which the following counties voted for a Democratic presidential candidate: Warren, Clinton, Westmoreland, Schuylkill, Armstrong, Columbia, Forest, and Indiana. It was also the last election until 2008 in which Pennsylvania was the most Republican of the three Rust Belt swing states (including Wisconsin and Michigan).

== Primaries ==
=== Democratic primary ===
Candidate	Votes	Percent
Bill Clinton (incumbent)	666,486	92.05%
Lyndon LaRouche	57,583	7.95%
Totals	724,069	Turnout: 23.00%

=== Republican primary ===
Candidate	Votes	Percent
Bob Dole	435,031	63.59%
Pat Buchanan	123,011	17.98%
Steve Forbes	55,028	8.04%
Other	71,043	10.38%
Totals	684,113	Turnout: 21.64%

== Results ==
1996 United States presidential election in Pennsylvania
Party	Candidate	Running mate	Votes	Percentage	Electoral votes
Democratic	Bill Clinton (incumbent)	Al Gore (incumbent)	2,215,819	49.17%	23
Republican	Bob Dole	Jack Kemp	1,801,169	39.97%	0
Reform	Ross Perot	Patrick Choate	430,984	9.56%	0
Libertarian	Harry Browne	Jo Jorgensen	28,000	0.62%	0
Constitution	Howard Phillips	Herbert Titus	19,552	0.43%	0
Natural Law	Dr. John Hagelin	Mike Tompkins	5,783	0.13%	0
Totals			4,495,524	100.00%	23

=== Results by county ===
County	Bill Clinton Democratic		Bob Dole Republican		Ross Perot Reform		Various candidates Other parties		Margin		Total votes cast
County	#	%	#	%	#	%	#	%	#	%	Total votes cast
Adams	10,774	36.51%	15,338	51.98%	3,186	10.80%	210	0.71%	-4,564	-15.47%	29,508
Allegheny	284,480	52.82%	204,067	37.89%	42,309	7.86%	7,759	1.44%	80,413	14.93%	538,615
Armstrong	11,130	43.17%	11,052	42.87%	3,452	13.39%	145	0.56%	78	0.30%	25,779
Beaver	39,578	53.28%	26,048	35.07%	8,276	11.14%	377	0.51%	13,530	18.21%	74,279
Bedford	5,954	32.85%	10,064	55.52%	2,041	11.26%	68	0.38%	-4,110	-22.67%	18,127
Berks	49,887	40.99%	56,289	46.25%	13,788	11.33%	1,754	1.44%	-6,402	-5.26%	121,718
Blair	15,036	36.95%	21,282	52.30%	4,014	9.86%	359	0.88%	-6,246	-15.35%	40,691
Bradford	7,736	36.82%	10,393	49.47%	2,712	12.91%	167	0.79%	-2,657	-12.65%	21,008
Bucks	103,313	45.44%	94,899	41.74%	24,544	10.80%	4,607	2.03%	8,414	3.70%	227,363
Butler	21,990	36.29%	32,038	52.88%	6,145	10.14%	418	0.69%	-10,048	-16.59%	60,591
Cambria	30,391	51.27%	20,341	34.32%	7,837	13.22%	706	1.19%	10,050	16.95%	59,275
Cameron	822	36.84%	1,113	49.89%	283	12.68%	13	0.58%	-291	-13.05%	2,231
Carbon	9,457	47.69%	7,193	36.28%	2,992	15.09%	187	0.94%	2,264	11.41%	19,829
Centre	21,145	45.16%	20,935	44.71%	4,173	8.91%	573	1.22%	210	0.45%	46,826
Chester	64,783	40.91%	77,029	48.64%	14,067	8.88%	2,487	1.57%	-12,246	-7.73%	158,366
Clarion	5,954	39.51%	6,916	45.89%	2,064	13.70%	137	0.91%	-962	-6.38%	15,071
Clearfield	11,991	41.41%	12,987	44.85%	3,758	12.98%	219	0.76%	-996	-3.44%	28,955
Clinton	5,658	49.27%	4,293	37.39%	1,424	12.40%	108	0.94%	1,365	11.88%	11,483
Columbia	8,379	41.13%	8,234	40.42%	3,654	17.94%	105	0.52%	145	0.71%	20,372
Crawford	12,943	41.16%	14,659	46.62%	3,519	11.19%	325	1.03%	-1,716	-5.46%	31,446
Cumberland	28,749	36.40%	43,943	55.63%	5,669	7.18%	624	0.79%	-15,194	-19.23%	78,985
Dauphin	40,936	44.03%	44,417	47.78%	6,967	7.49%	651	0.70%	-3,481	-3.75%	92,971
Delaware	115,946	49.39%	92,628	39.46%	21,883	9.32%	4,291	1.83%	23,318	9.93%	234,748
Elk	5,749	44.18%	4,889	37.57%	2,293	17.62%	82	0.63%	860	6.61%	13,013
Erie	57,508	52.86%	39,884	36.66%	10,386	9.55%	1,013	0.93%	17,624	16.20%	108,791
Fayette	26,359	56.65%	14,019	30.13%	5,722	12.30%	432	0.93%	12,340	26.52%	46,532
Forest	964	43.80%	902	40.98%	325	14.77%	10	0.45%	62	2.82%	2,201
Franklin	14,980	33.49%	25,392	56.77%	4,127	9.23%	231	0.52%	-10,412	-23.28%	44,730
Fulton	1,620	33.28%	2,665	54.75%	554	11.38%	29	0.60%	-1,045	-21.47%	4,868
Greene	7,620	55.47%	4,002	29.14%	2,052	14.94%	62	0.45%	3,618	26.33%	13,736
Huntingdon	5,285	36.46%	7,324	50.53%	1,813	12.51%	73	0.50%	-2,039	-14.07%	14,495
Indiana	13,868	45.35%	12,874	42.10%	3,674	12.01%	167	0.55%	994	3.25%	30,583
Jefferson	5,846	35.52%	8,156	49.56%	2,322	14.11%	133	0.81%	-2,310	-14.04%	16,457
Juniata	2,896	36.27%	4,128	51.70%	911	11.41%	49	0.61%	-1,232	-15.43%	7,984
Lackawanna	46,377	56.09%	26,930	32.57%	8,189	9.90%	1,185	1.43%	19,447	23.52%	82,681
Lancaster	49,120	31.63%	92,875	59.81%	11,601	7.47%	1,690	1.09%	-43,755	-28.18%	155,286
Lawrence	18,993	52.38%	13,088	36.10%	4,002	11.04%	176	0.49%	5,905	16.28%	36,259
Lebanon	14,187	34.83%	21,885	53.73%	4,235	10.40%	428	1.05%	-7,698	-18.90%	40,735
Lehigh	48,568	45.77%	45,103	42.51%	10,947	10.32%	1,492	1.41%	3,465	3.26%	106,110
Luzerne	60,174	51.51%	43,577	37.30%	12,424	10.64%	642	0.55%	16,597	14.21%	116,817
Lycoming	13,516	34.44%	21,535	54.88%	3,855	9.82%	335	0.85%	-8,019	-20.44%	39,241
McKean	5,509	37.05%	6,838	45.99%	2,350	15.80%	172	1.16%	-1,329	-8.94%	14,869
Mercer	23,003	50.25%	17,213	37.60%	5,108	11.16%	455	0.99%	5,790	12.65%	45,779
Mifflin	5,327	38.83%	6,888	50.21%	1,392	10.15%	111	0.81%	-1,561	-11.38%	13,718
Monroe	16,547	42.36%	17,326	44.35%	4,650	11.90%	542	1.39%	-779	-1.99%	39,065
Montgomery	143,664	48.87%	121,047	41.18%	24,392	8.30%	4,858	1.65%	22,617	7.69%	293,961
Montour	2,183	37.57%	2,785	47.93%	784	13.49%	59	1.02%	-602	-10.36%	5,811
Northampton	43,959	48.31%	35,726	39.26%	9,848	10.82%	1,469	1.61%	8,233	9.05%	91,002
Northumberland	13,418	41.41%	13,551	41.82%	5,173	15.97%	258	0.80%	-133	-0.41%	32,400
Perry	4,611	31.77%	8,156	56.19%	1,609	11.09%	139	0.96%	-3,545	-24.42%	14,515
Philadelphia	412,988	77.44%	85,345	16.00%	29,329	5.50%	5,615	1.05%	327,643	61.44%	533,277
Pike	5,509	38.68%	6,697	47.02%	1,873	13.15%	165	1.16%	-1,188	-8.34%	14,244
Potter	2,146	31.48%	3,714	54.48%	925	13.57%	32	0.47%	-1,568	-23.00%	6,817
Schuylkill	24,860	43.90%	22,920	40.47%	8,471	14.96%	378	0.67%	1,940	3.43%	56,629
Snyder	3,405	29.25%	6,742	57.91%	1,451	12.46%	44	0.38%	-3,337	-28.66%	11,642
Somerset	12,719	40.26%	14,735	46.64%	3,968	12.56%	169	0.53%	-2,016	-6.38%	31,591
Sullivan	1,071	37.47%	1,352	47.31%	418	14.63%	17	0.59%	-281	-9.84%	2,858
Susquehanna	5,912	37.81%	7,354	47.03%	2,266	14.49%	104	0.67%	-1,442	-9.22%	15,636
Tioga	4,961	34.39%	7,382	51.18%	1,993	13.82%	89	0.62%	-2,421	-16.79%	14,425
Union	3,658	31.20%	6,570	56.04%	1,431	12.21%	65	0.55%	-2,912	-24.84%	11,724
Venango	8,205	41.97%	8,398	42.96%	2,777	14.21%	169	0.86%	-193	-0.99%	19,549
Warren	7,291	42.72%	7,056	41.34%	2,504	14.67%	216	1.27%	235	1.38%	17,067
Washington	40,952	52.67%	27,777	35.73%	8,661	11.14%	355	0.46%	13,175	16.94%	77,745
Wayne	5,928	36.29%	8,077	49.45%	2,126	13.02%	203	1.24%	-2,149	-13.16%	16,334
Westmoreland	63,686	44.43%	62,058	43.30%	16,230	11.32%	1,355	0.95%	1,628	1.13%	143,329
Wyoming	4,049	38.90%	4,888	46.96%	1,414	13.59%	57	0.55%	-839	-8.06%	10,408
York	49,596	38.70%	65,188	50.87%	11,652	9.09%	1,720	1.34%	-15,592	-12.17%	128,156
Totals	2,215,819	49.17%	1,801,169	39.97%	430,984	9.56%	58,146	1.29%	414,650	9.20%	4,506,118

Counties that flipped from Democratic to Republican

- Clearfield

Counties that flipped from Republican to Democratic

- Columbia
- Schuylkill

=== By congressional district ===
Clinton won 15 of 21 districts, including five held by Republicans, while the other six were won by Dole, including one held by a Democrat.

District	Clinton	Dole	Perot	Representative
1st	84%	12%	4%	Thomas M. Foglietta
2nd	87%	10%	3%	Chaka Fattah
3rd	61%	28%	10%	Robert Borski
4th	49%	41%	10%	Ron Klink
5th	41%	46%	13%	William Clinger
5th	41%	46%	13%	John E. Peterson
6th	42%	45%	13%	Tim Holden
7th	45%	44%	9%	Curt Weldon
8th	45%	42%	11%	Jim Greenwood
9th	36%	53%	11%	Bud Shuster
10th	45%	43%	12%	Joseph M. McDade
11th	49%	39%	13%	Paul Kanjorski
12th	47%	41%	13%	John Murtha
13th	49%	42%	8%	Jon D. Fox
14th	59%	33%	7%	William J. Coyne
15th	47%	41%	11%	Paul McHale
16th	38%	54%	9%	Bob Walker
16th	38%	54%	9%	Joe Pitts
17th	38%	54%	8%	George Gekas
18th	52%	39%	9%	Mike Doyle
19th	38%	53%	9%	Bill Goodling
20th	50%	39%	11%	Frank Mascara
21st	49%	41%	10%	Phil English

== See also ==
- United States presidential elections in Pennsylvania
