= 2026 Maine elections =

US state elections

- November 3, 2026

The 2026 Maine elections were held in the U.S. state of Maine in 2026 as part of the 2026 United States elections.

== Federal ==
- 2026 United States Senate election in Maine
- 2026 United States House of Representatives elections in Maine

== Statewide ==
- 2026 Maine gubernatorial election
- 2026 Maine House of Representatives election
- 2026 Maine State Senate election
