= 1992 United States presidential election in Pennsylvania =

- November 3, 1992
- Turnout: 82.8%

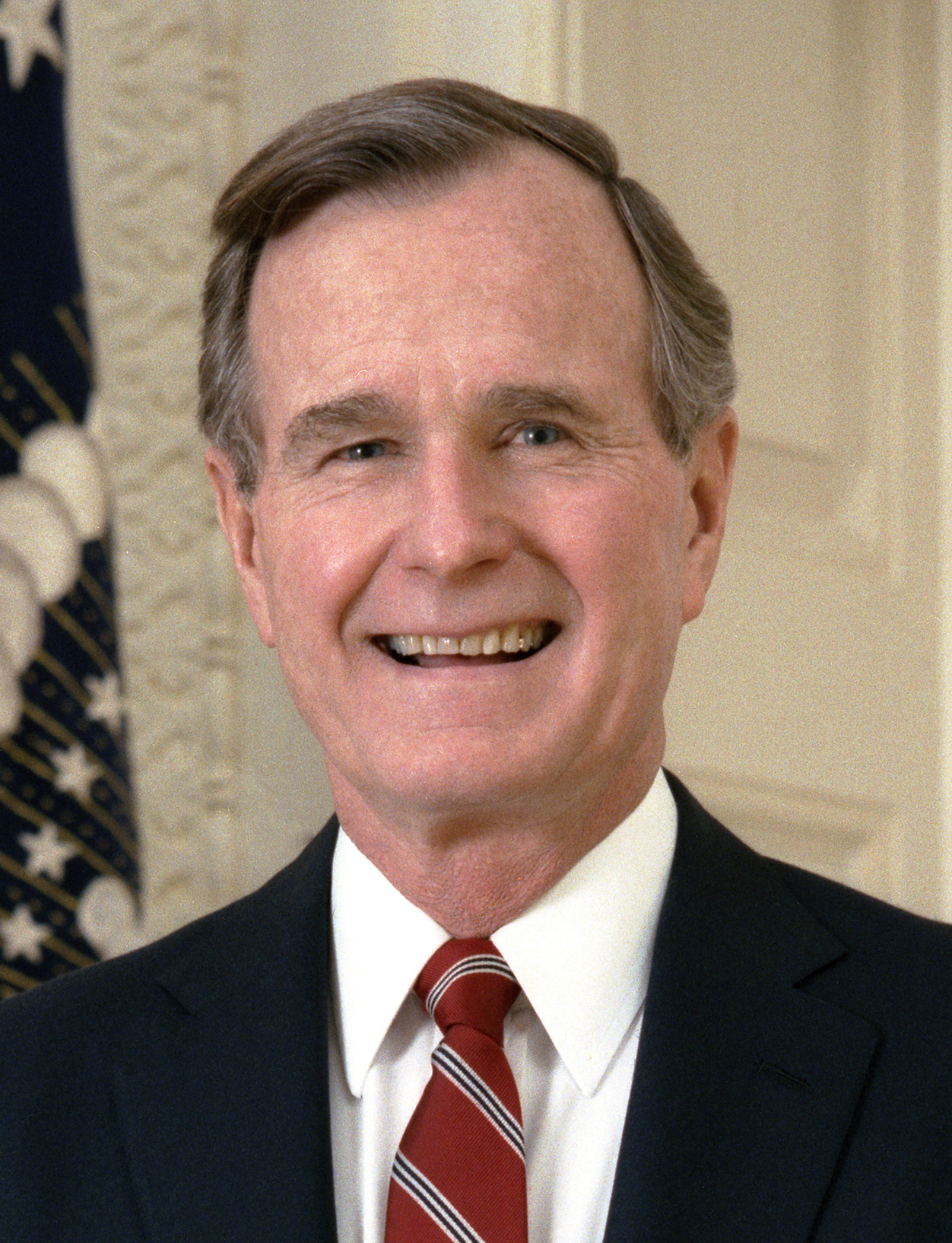

| Nominee | Bill Clinton | George H. W. Bush | Ross Perot |
| Party | Democratic | Republican | Pennsylvanians |
| Alliance | | | Independent |
| Home state | Arkansas | Texas | Texas |
| Running mate | Al Gore | Dan Quayle | James Stockdale |
| Electoral vote | 23 | 0 | 0 |
| Popular vote | 2,239,164 | 1,791,841 | 902,667 |
| Percentage | 45.15% | 36.12% | 18.20% |

Clinton
30–40%
40–50%
50–60%
60–70%
70–80%
80–90%
90–100%
Bush
30–40%
40–50%
50–60%
60–70%
70–80%
80–90%
Perot
30–40%
40–50%
>70%
Tie/No Votes
President before election
George H. W. Bush
Republican
Elected President
Bill Clinton
Democratic

The 1992 United States presidential election in Pennsylvania took place on November 3, 1992, and was part of the 1992 United States presidential election. Voters chose 23 representatives, or electors to the Electoral College, who voted for president and vice president.

Pennsylvania was won by Governor Bill Clinton (D) by a margin of 9.02%. Billionaire businessman Ross Perot (I-TX) finished in third, with 18.20% of Pennsylvania's popular vote.

As of the 2024 presidential election, this is the last election in which Clearfield County voted for the Democratic candidate.

== Primaries ==
=== Democratic primary ===
| Candidate | Votes | Percent |
|---|---|---|
| Bill Clinton | 715,031 | 56.50% |
| Jerry Brown | 325,543 | 25.72% |
| Paul Tsongas | 161,572 | 12.77% |
| Others | 63,349 | 5.01% |
| Totals | 1,265,495 | Turnout: 46.69% |

=== Republican primary ===
| Candidate | Votes | Percent |
|---|---|---|
| George H. W. Bush (incumbent) | 774,865 | 76.81% |
| Pat Buchanan | 233,912 | 23.19% |
| Totals | 1,008,777 | Turnout: 42.70% |

== Results ==
1992 United States presidential election in Pennsylvania
| Party | Candidate | Running mate | Votes | Percentage | Electoral votes |
|---|---|---|---|---|---|
| Democratic | Bill Clinton | Al Gore | 2,239,164 | 45.15% | 23 |
| Republican | George H. W. Bush (incumbent) | Dan Quayle (incumbent) | 1,791,841 | 36.12% | 0 |
| Pennsylvanians | Ross Perot | James Stockdale | 902,667 | 18.20% | 0 |
| Libertarian | Andre Marrou | Nancy Lord | 21,477 | 0.43% | 0 |
| New Alliance Party | Lenora Fulani | Maria Elizabeth Muñoz | 4,661 | 0.09% | 0 |
| Totals | | | 4,959,810 | 100.0% | 23 |

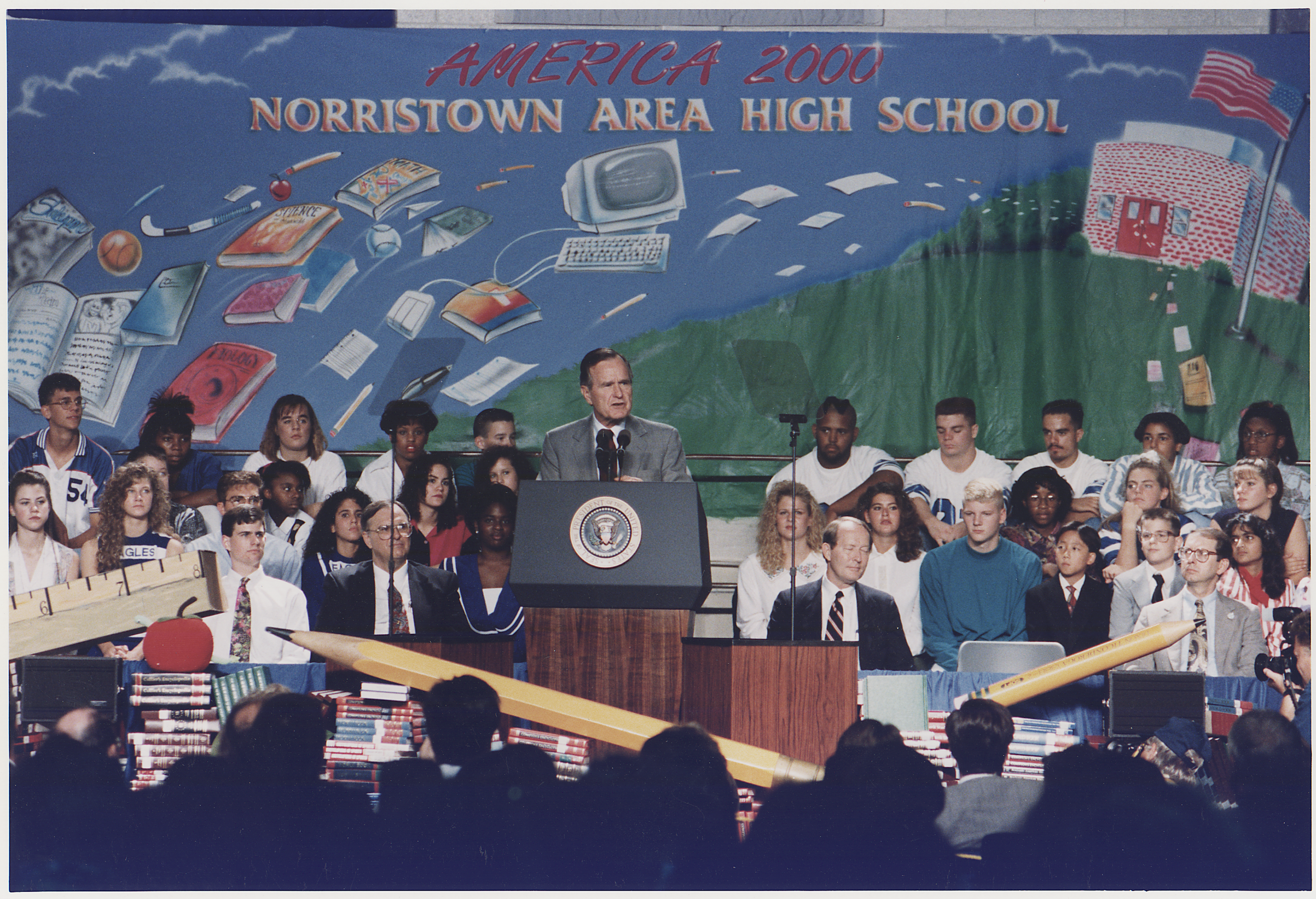
Bush on campaign. Seen here speaking at the Norristown, Pennsylvania High School, September, 1992.

=== Results by county ===
| County | Bill Clinton Democratic | | George H. W. Bush Republican | | Ross Perot Independent | | Various candidates Other parties | | Margin | | Total votes cast |
| County | # | % | # | % | # | % | # | % | # | % | Total votes cast |
|---|---|---|---|---|---|---|---|---|---|---|---|
| Adams | 9,576 | 32.46% | 13,552 | 45.94% | 6,313 | 21.40% | 60 | 0.20% | -3,976 | -13.48% | 29,501 |
| Allegheny | 324,004 | 52.75% | 183,035 | 29.80% | 103,470 | 16.85% | 3,678 | 0.60% | 140,969 | 22.95% | 614,187 |
| Armstrong | 12,995 | 45.87% | 9,122 | 32.20% | 6,166 | 21.76% | 50 | 0.18% | 3,873 | 13.67% | 28,333 |
| Beaver | 44,877 | 54.50% | 21,361 | 25.94% | 15,954 | 19.38% | 148 | 0.18% | 23,516 | 28.56% | 82,340 |
| Bedford | 5,840 | 31.04% | 9,216 | 48.98% | 3,731 | 19.83% | 30 | 0.16% | -3,376 | -17.94% | 18,817 |
| Berks | 46,031 | 35.03% | 52,939 | 40.29% | 31,663 | 24.10% | 774 | 0.59% | -6,908 | -5.26% | 131,407 |
| Blair | 14,857 | 33.19% | 21,447 | 47.92% | 8,284 | 18.51% | 170 | 0.38% | -6,590 | -14.73% | 44,758 |
| Bradford | 6,903 | 30.51% | 10,221 | 45.17% | 5,452 | 24.09% | 52 | 0.23% | -3,318 | -14.66% | 22,628 |
| Bucks | 97,902 | 39.40% | 94,584 | 38.06% | 53,931 | 21.70% | 2,090 | 0.84% | 3,318 | 1.34% | 248,507 |
| Butler | 22,303 | 36.48% | 23,656 | 38.70% | 15,013 | 24.56% | 158 | 0.26% | -1,353 | -2.22% | 61,130 |
| Cambria | 34,334 | 51.75% | 20,770 | 31.30% | 11,070 | 16.68% | 175 | 0.26% | 13,564 | 20.45% | 66,349 |
| Cameron | 824 | 30.77% | 1,173 | 43.80% | 676 | 25.24% | 5 | 0.19% | -349 | -13.03% | 2,678 |
| Carbon | 9,072 | 41.89% | 7,243 | 33.44% | 5,222 | 24.11% | 122 | 0.56% | 1,829 | 8.45% | 21,659 |
| Centre | 21,177 | 41.34% | 20,478 | 39.98% | 9,356 | 18.26% | 214 | 0.42% | 699 | 1.36% | 51,225 |
| Chester | 59,643 | 35.25% | 74,002 | 43.73% | 34,536 | 20.41% | 1,027 | 0.61% | -14,359 | -8.48% | 169,208 |
| Clarion | 5,584 | 35.53% | 6,477 | 41.21% | 3,619 | 23.02% | 38 | 0.24% | -893 | -5.68% | 15,718 |
| Clearfield | 12,247 | 39.70% | 11,553 | 37.45% | 6,989 | 22.66% | 58 | 0.19% | 694 | 2.25% | 30,847 |
| Clinton | 5,397 | 42.94% | 4,471 | 35.57% | 2,654 | 21.12% | 47 | 0.37% | 926 | 7.37% | 12,569 |
| Columbia | 8,261 | 34.80% | 9,742 | 41.04% | 5,683 | 23.94% | 53 | 0.22% | -1,481 | -6.24% | 23,739 |
| Crawford | 12,813 | 37.00% | 14,112 | 40.75% | 7,392 | 21.35% | 311 | 0.90% | -1,299 | -3.75% | 34,628 |
| Cumberland | 26,635 | 31.49% | 43,447 | 51.37% | 14,344 | 16.96% | 147 | 0.17% | -16,812 | -19.88% | 84,573 |
| Dauphin | 36,990 | 37.40% | 45,479 | 45.98% | 16,063 | 16.24% | 378 | 0.38% | -8,489 | -8.58% | 98,910 |
| Delaware | 111,210 | 41.80% | 108,587 | 40.81% | 43,728 | 16.43% | 2,549 | 0.96% | 2,623 | 0.99% | 266,074 |
| Elk | 5,016 | 36.26% | 4,908 | 35.48% | 3,885 | 28.09% | 23 | 0.17% | 108 | 0.78% | 13,832 |
| Erie | 56,381 | 47.86% | 39,283 | 33.35% | 21,510 | 18.26% | 630 | 0.53% | 17,098 | 14.51% | 117,804 |
| Fayette | 30,577 | 56.77% | 12,820 | 23.80% | 10,162 | 18.87% | 302 | 0.56% | 17,757 | 32.97% | 53,861 |
| Forest | 890 | 41.51% | 801 | 37.36% | 448 | 20.90% | 5 | 0.23% | 89 | 4.15% | 2,144 |
| Franklin | 13,440 | 30.66% | 23,387 | 53.35% | 6,941 | 15.83% | 66 | 0.15% | -9,947 | -22.69% | 43,834 |
| Fulton | 1,588 | 31.61% | 2,558 | 50.93% | 869 | 17.30% | 8 | 0.16% | -970 | -19.32% | 5,023 |
| Greene | 8,438 | 55.75% | 3,482 | 23.01% | 3,186 | 21.05% | 29 | 0.19% | 4,956 | 32.74% | 15,135 |
| Huntingdon | 5,153 | 32.82% | 7,249 | 46.17% | 3,273 | 20.85% | 25 | 0.16% | -2,096 | -13.35% | 15,700 |
| Indiana | 15,194 | 45.61% | 10,966 | 32.92% | 7,089 | 21.28% | 65 | 0.20% | 4,228 | 12.69% | 33,314 |
| Jefferson | 5,998 | 33.87% | 7,271 | 41.05% | 4,403 | 24.86% | 39 | 0.22% | -1,273 | -7.18% | 17,711 |
| Juniata | 2,601 | 30.89% | 3,980 | 47.27% | 1,819 | 21.60% | 20 | 0.24% | -1,379 | -16.38% | 8,420 |
| Lackawanna | 45,054 | 47.44% | 33,443 | 35.22% | 15,667 | 16.50% | 804 | 0.85% | 11,611 | 12.22% | 94,968 |
| Lancaster | 44,255 | 27.63% | 88,447 | 55.22% | 26,807 | 16.74% | 671 | 0.42% | -44,192 | -27.59% | 160,180 |
| Lawrence | 20,830 | 50.55% | 12,359 | 30.00% | 7,950 | 19.29% | 64 | 0.16% | 8,471 | 20.55% | 41,203 |
| Lebanon | 12,350 | 28.71% | 21,512 | 50.00% | 9,005 | 20.93% | 154 | 0.36% | -9,162 | -21.29% | 43,021 |
| Lehigh | 46,711 | 40.68% | 42,631 | 37.12% | 24,853 | 21.64% | 641 | 0.56% | 4,080 | 3.56% | 114,836 |
| Luzerne | 56,623 | 44.53% | 49,285 | 38.76% | 21,007 | 16.52% | 231 | 0.18% | 7,338 | 5.77% | 127,146 |
| Lycoming | 13,315 | 30.84% | 20,536 | 47.57% | 9,170 | 21.24% | 151 | 0.35% | -7,221 | -16.73% | 43,172 |
| McKean | 5,331 | 32.51% | 6,965 | 42.47% | 4,019 | 24.51% | 85 | 0.52% | -1,634 | -9.96% | 16,400 |
| Mercer | 23,264 | 46.68% | 16,081 | 32.27% | 10,277 | 20.62% | 214 | 0.43% | 7,183 | 14.41% | 49,836 |
| Mifflin | 4,946 | 33.67% | 6,300 | 42.89% | 3,382 | 23.03% | 60 | 0.41% | -1,354 | -9.22% | 14,688 |
| Monroe | 13,468 | 35.91% | 14,557 | 38.82% | 9,257 | 24.69% | 218 | 0.58% | -1,089 | -2.91% | 37,500 |
| Montgomery | 136,572 | 42.87% | 125,704 | 39.46% | 53,738 | 16.87% | 2,562 | 0.80% | 10,868 | 3.41% | 318,576 |
| Montour | 2,150 | 32.35% | 3,096 | 46.58% | 1,373 | 20.66% | 27 | 0.41% | -946 | -14.23% | 6,646 |
| Northampton | 42,203 | 43.27% | 34,429 | 35.30% | 20,234 | 20.75% | 659 | 0.68% | 7,774 | 7.97% | 97,525 |
| Northumberland | 12,814 | 35.80% | 15,057 | 42.07% | 7,782 | 21.74% | 139 | 0.39% | -2,243 | -6.27% | 35,792 |
| Perry | 4,086 | 26.66% | 7,871 | 51.35% | 3,334 | 21.75% | 36 | 0.23% | -3,785 | -24.69% | 15,327 |
| Philadelphia | 434,904 | 68.16% | 133,328 | 20.90% | 65,455 | 10.26% | 4,371 | 0.69% | 301,576 | 47.26% | 638,058 |
| Pike | 4,382 | 32.21% | 6,084 | 44.73% | 3,019 | 22.19% | 118 | 0.87% | -1,702 | -12.52% | 13,603 |
| Potter | 1,892 | 26.86% | 3,452 | 49.01% | 1,687 | 23.95% | 13 | 0.18% | -1,560 | -22.15% | 7,044 |
| Schuylkill | 23,679 | 37.57% | 25,780 | 40.90% | 13,398 | 21.26% | 172 | 0.27% | -2,101 | -3.33% | 63,029 |
| Snyder | 2,952 | 23.44% | 6,934 | 55.05% | 2,686 | 21.32% | 24 | 0.19% | -3,982 | -31.61% | 12,596 |
| Somerset | 12,493 | 38.14% | 13,858 | 42.30% | 6,333 | 19.33% | 75 | 0.23% | -1,365 | -4.16% | 32,759 |
| Sullivan | 1,030 | 33.09% | 1,340 | 43.05% | 731 | 23.48% | 12 | 0.39% | -310 | -9.96% | 3,113 |
| Susquehanna | 5,368 | 32.13% | 7,356 | 44.02% | 3,946 | 23.62% | 39 | 0.23% | -1,988 | -11.89% | 16,709 |
| Tioga | 4,868 | 29.43% | 7,823 | 47.29% | 3,804 | 22.99% | 48 | 0.29% | -2,955 | -17.86% | 16,543 |
| Union | 3,623 | 29.54% | 6,362 | 51.87% | 2,255 | 18.39% | 25 | 0.20% | -2,739 | -22.33% | 12,265 |
| Venango | 8,230 | 38.18% | 8,545 | 39.64% | 4,695 | 21.78% | 84 | 0.39% | -315 | -1.46% | 21,554 |
| Warren | 6,972 | 37.84% | 6,585 | 35.74% | 4,795 | 26.02% | 74 | 0.40% | 387 | 2.10% | 18,426 |
| Washington | 46,143 | 54.70% | 21,977 | 26.05% | 16,083 | 19.06% | 161 | 0.19% | 24,166 | 28.65% | 84,364 |
| Wayne | 4,817 | 28.64% | 8,184 | 48.65% | 3,727 | 22.16% | 94 | 0.56% | -3,367 | -20.01% | 16,822 |
| Westmoreland | 69,817 | 45.20% | 47,315 | 30.63% | 37,036 | 23.98% | 283 | 0.18% | 22,502 | 14.57% | 154,451 |
| Wyoming | 3,158 | 29.11% | 5,143 | 47.40% | 2,525 | 23.27% | 24 | 0.22% | -1,985 | -18.29% | 10,850 |
| York | 46,113 | 34.35% | 60,130 | 44.79% | 27,743 | 20.67% | 259 | 0.19% | -14,017 | -10.44% | 134,245 |
| Totals | 2,239,164 | 45.15% | 1,791,841 | 36.13% | 902,667 | 18.20% | 26,138 | 0.53% | 447,323 | 9.02% | 4,959,810 |

==== Counties that flipped from Republican to Democratic ====
- Bucks
- Carbon
- Centre
- Clearfield
- Delaware
- Elk
- Forest
- Lehigh
- Luzerne
- Monroe
- Montgomery
- Northampton
- Warren

== See also ==
- United States presidential elections in Pennsylvania
