= Elections in North Dakota =

Statewide elections in the U.S. state of North Dakota take place every two years. Most executive offices and all legislators are elected to four-year terms, with half the terms expiring on U.S. Presidential election years, and the other half expiring on mid-term election years.

In a 2020 study, North Dakota was ranked as the 8th easiest state for citizens to vote in.

== Voting requirements ==
North Dakota is the only state in the United States that does not require voter registration. The registration requirement was abolished in 1951. In general, any person over the age of 18 who has lived in a precinct for three or more months may vote in local, state or federal elections, without registration. In order to vote, however, a person must provide identification approved by the North Dakota Secretary of State as well as proof of entitlement to vote at the polling place before being permitted to vote.

For the 2016 election, the accepted forms of identification included a North Dakota driver's license, non-driver's ID card, tribal government issued ID card, or an identification card provided by a North Dakota long-term care facility. Neither a United States Passport nor a North Dakota College- or University-issued ID card are accepted forms of identification.

North Dakota is exempt from the requirements of the federal National Voter Registration Act of 1993. Because of this exemption, North Dakota has since 2004 required voters to produce an approved form of ID before being able to vote, one of which was a tribe ID commonly used by Native Americans. It was common and lawful for a post office box to be used on this ID, instead of a residential address, because there are no street addresses on reservations. A change in 2016 required tribal ID to have a residential address to be accepted, and North Dakota has been accused of voter suppression with many Native Americans being denied a vote because they did not have an approved form of ID with a residential address.

North Dakota's ID law especially adversely affected large numbers of Native Americans, with almost a quarter of Native Americans in the state, otherwise eligible to vote, being denied a vote on the basis that they do not have proper ID; compared to 12% of non-Indians. A judge overturned the ID law in July 2016, also saying: "The undisputed evidence before the Court reveals that voter fraud in North Dakota has been virtually non-existent." However, the denial of a vote on this basis was also an issue in the 2018 mid-term election. Starting with the 2018 election, voters without proper identification can fill out a "set aside" ballot, which is only counted if the voter presents proper identification to a county official before the results are certified by the county canvassing board, which typically is six days after an election is held.

== Primary elections ==
Each party holds a series of party conventions in the spring of election years to endorse candidates to the various partisan offices that are up that year; legislative candidates are endorsed at district conventions and statewide candidates are endorsed at a state convention. Those candidates are automatically placed on the primary election ballot, where they may or may not face competition from other candidates placed there by petition. The primary election winner then appears on the general election ballot. All primary elections in North Dakota are open to all qualified North Dakota electors, regardless of party affiliation.

== Federal elections ==
=== President ===
Since the 1972 presidential election, North Dakota has sent three electors to the Electoral College, who the voters pick in a statewide first-past-the-post winner-take-all popular vote.

=== United States Senate ===
Like all US states, North Dakota sends two senators to the United States Senate. North Dakota's two senators are in classes 1 and 3. Senator John Hoeven was elected in 2010 and re-elected since, and Kevin Cramer was elected in 2018.

=== United States House of Representatives ===
Since 1972, North Dakota has had a single seat in the United States House of Representatives; Kelly Armstrong currently fills the seat, the term for which expires every two years.

== State elections ==
=== Governor ===
The North Dakota governor and lieutenant governor are elected every four years, concurrent with the federal presidential election. The two offices are elected together on a single ballot line.

=== Other executive offices ===
Most of the other statewide executive offices are elected in a statewide popular vote for four-year terms. On presidential election years, voters select a State Auditor, State Treasurer, and Insurance Commissioner, all on a partisan ballot. They also select a Superintendent of Public Instruction on a nonpartisan ballot. On mid-term election years, voters select an Attorney General, Secretary of State, Commissioner of Agriculture, and Tax Commissioner. In addition, every two years, voters select someone to fill a six-year seat on the Public Service Commission.

=== Legislature ===
All members of the North Dakota Legislative Assembly—whether the House of Representatives or the Senate—are elected to four-year terms. Even-numbered legislative districts elect one senator and two representatives in presidential election years; odd-numbered districts do so in mid-term election years.

=== Supreme Court ===
Members of the North Dakota Supreme Court are elected by the people on a nonpartisan ballot to ten-year terms, arranged so that one seat is up for election every two years.

== Proposed restrictions to voting in 2021 ==
Since the 2020 U.S. Presidential election, Republicans in North Dakota have introduced a number of bills that would tighten election laws in the state. House Bill 1289 would lengthen residency requirements for voters, requiring residency in the state of one year, and three months in a precinct, House Bill 1312 would place additional restrictions on who can vote absentee, and House Bill 1397 would adjust the congressional redistricting process. Senate Bill 2271, introduced by Republican Senator Robert Erbele and passed 43-3 (Republicans hold a 40-vote majority in the Senate), would withhold the state's vote count from the public until after votes in the Electoral College have been cast; the measure is intended to prevent the implementation of the National Popular Vote Interstate Compact, a multi-state agreement to implement a national popular vote for the election of the president. (Note: The National Popular Vote Interstate Compact (NPVIC) makes clever use of the rules of the Electoral College to implement a national popular vote without actually abolishing the Electoral College, which would require a constitutional amendment. Under the agreement, once states collectively having over 270 electoral votes (a majority in the Electoral College) sign on to the NPVIC, they agree to award all of their electoral votes to the winner of the national popular vote, thereby guaranteeing that the winner of the popular vote receives a majority of votes in the Electoral College. Senate Bill 2271 would thwart the NPVIC by preventing North Dakota's vote totals from being added to the national vote count, making it impossible to determine the national popular vote.)

== See also ==
- 2024 North Dakota elections
- Political party strength in North Dakota
- United States presidential elections in North Dakota
- Women's suffrage in North Dakota
