= 2026 Rhode Island elections =

A general election was held in the U.S. state of Rhode Island on November 3, 2026. All of Rhode Island's executive officers are up for election as well as one of state's two seats in the United States Senate and both of the state's two seats in the United States House of Representatives. The Statewide Primary Election were held on Wednesday, September 9, 2026 due to the Labor Day holiday.
