= 1980 United States presidential election in Pennsylvania =

- November 4, 1980

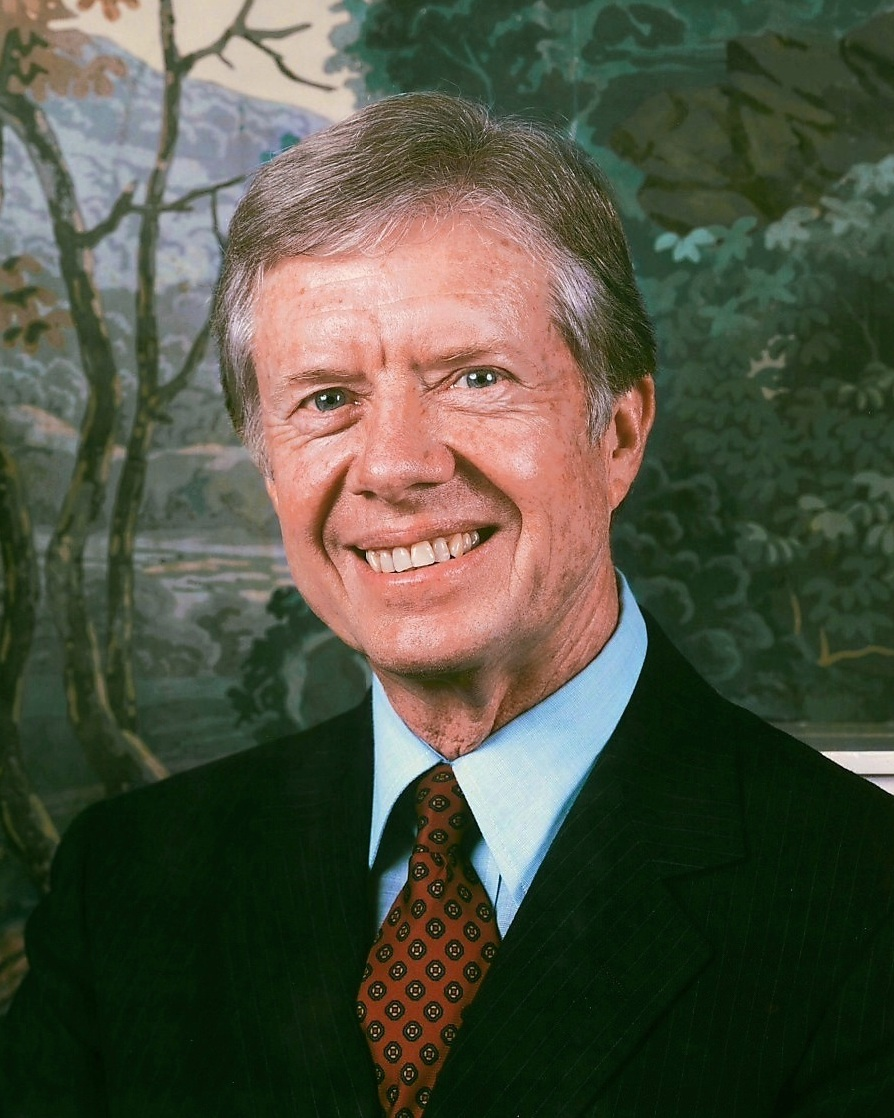

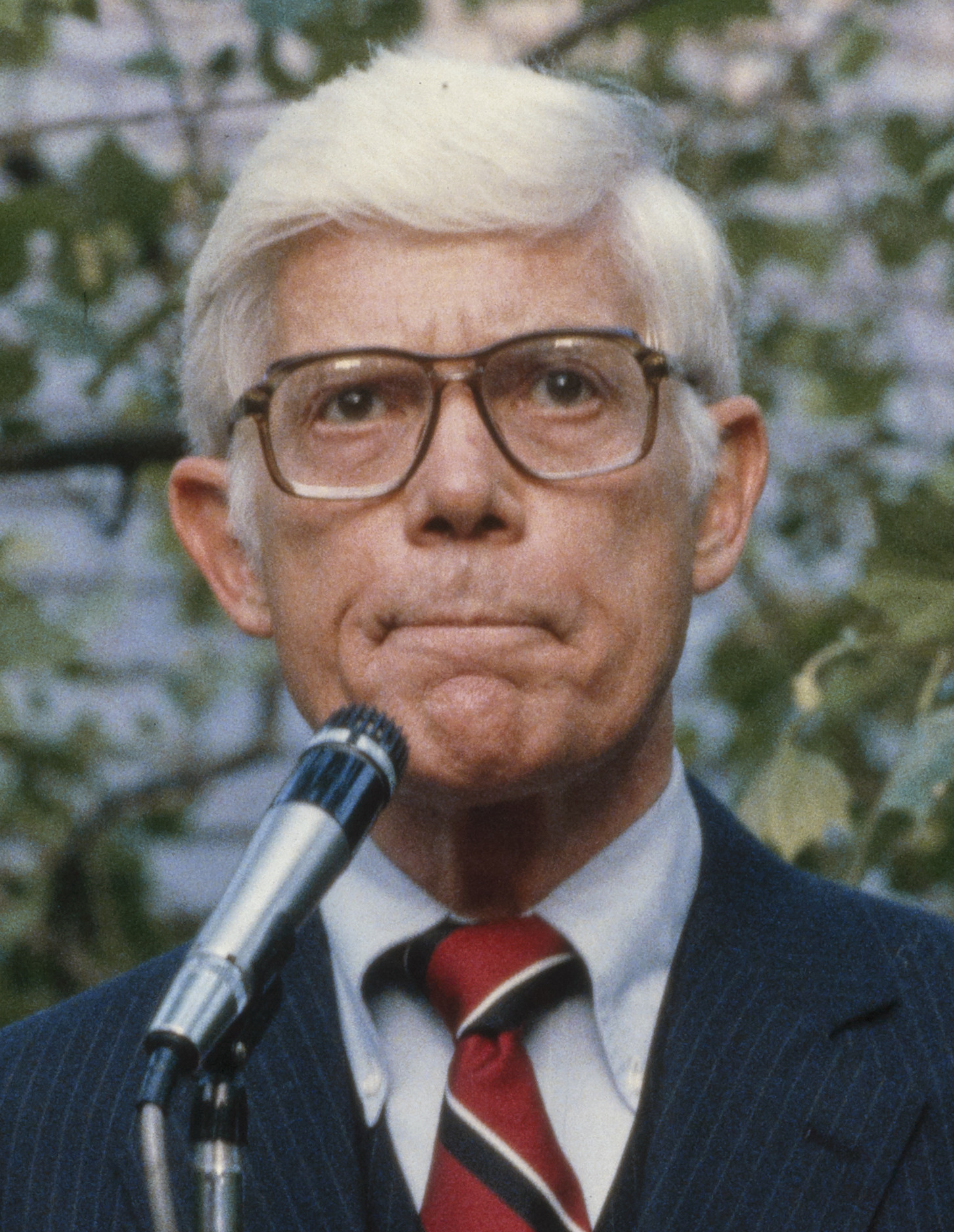
Nominee	Ronald Reagan	Jimmy Carter	John B. Anderson
Party	Republican	Democratic	Anderson Coalition
Home state	California	Georgia	Illinois
Running mate	George H. W. Bush	Walter Mondale	Patrick Lucey
Electoral vote	27	0	0
Popular vote	2,261,872	1,937,540	292,921
Percentage	49.59%	42.48%	6.42%
County results
Reagan
40–50%
50–60%
60–70%
70–80%
Carter
40–50%
50–60%
President before election
Jimmy Carter
Democratic
Elected President
Ronald Reagan
Republican

The 1980 United States presidential election in Pennsylvania took place on November 4, 1980, and was part of the 1980 United States presidential election. Voters chose 27 representatives, or electors to the Electoral College, who voted for president and vice president.

Pennsylvania voted for the Republican nominee, former Governor Ronald Reagan, over the Democratic nominee, President Jimmy Carter. Reagan won Pennsylvania by a margin of 7.11%. This result nonetheless made Pennsylvania about 2.6% more Democratic than the nation-at-large.

== Primaries ==
=== Republican primary ===
Candidate	Votes	Delegates	Percent
George H. W. Bush	626,759	46	51.72%
Ronald Reagan	527,916	39	43.56%
Howard Baker	30,848	0	2.55%
Others	26,311	0	2.17%
Totals	1,211,834	85	Turnout: 55.32%

=== Democratic primary ===
Candidate	Votes	Delegates	Percent
Ted Kennedy	736,954	99	46.04%
Jimmy Carter (incumbent)	732,332	99	45.75%
Others	131,534	0	8.22%
Totals	1,600,820	198	Turnout: 52.10%

== Results ==
1980 United States presidential election in Pennsylvania
Party	Candidate	Votes	Percentage	Electoral votes
Republican	Ronald Reagan	2,261,872	49.59%	27
Democratic	Jimmy Carter (incumbent)	1,937,540	42.48%	0
Anderson Coalition	John Anderson	292,921	6.42%	0
Libertarian	Edward Clark	33,263	0.73%	0
Socialist Workers	Clifton DeBerry	20,291	0.44%	0
Consumer	Barry Commoner	10,430	0.23%	0
Communist	Gus Hall	5,184	0.11%	0
Totals		4,561,501	100.00%	27

=== Results by county ===
County	Ronald Reagan Republican		Jimmy Carter Democratic		John B. Anderson Anderson Coalition		Various candidates Other parties		Margin		Total votes cast
County	#	%	#	%	#	%	#	%	#	%	Total votes cast
Adams	13,760	61.42%	7,266	32.43%	1,139	5.08%	239	1.07%	6,494	28.99%	22,404
Allegheny	271,850	43.75%	297,464	47.87%	38,710	6.23%	13,394	2.16%	-25,614	-4.12%	621,418
Armstrong	12,955	47.80%	12,718	46.92%	1,153	4.25%	278	1.03%	237	0.88%	27,104
Beaver	30,496	38.23%	43,955	55.11%	4,549	5.70%	765	0.96%	-13,459	-16.88%	79,765
Bedford	10,930	66.57%	4,950	30.15%	416	2.53%	123	0.75%	5,980	36.42%	16,419
Berks	60,576	56.41%	36,449	33.94%	8,863	8.25%	1,497	1.39%	24,127	22.47%	107,385
Blair	28,931	62.41%	15,014	32.39%	2,011	4.34%	403	0.87%	13,917	30.02%	46,359
Bradford	13,139	62.97%	6,439	30.86%	1,068	5.12%	219	1.05%	6,700	32.11%	20,865
Bucks	100,536	55.49%	59,120	32.63%	18,107	9.99%	3,401	1.88%	41,416	22.86%	181,164
Butler	28,821	54.70%	19,711	37.41%	3,453	6.55%	704	1.34%	9,110	17.29%	52,689
Cambria	33,072	45.85%	36,121	50.08%	2,398	3.32%	540	0.75%	-3,049	-4.23%	72,131
Cameron	1,795	59.24%	1,112	36.70%	92	3.04%	31	1.02%	683	22.54%	3,030
Carbon	10,042	51.95%	8,009	41.44%	956	4.95%	322	1.67%	2,033	10.51%	19,329
Centre	20,605	48.33%	15,987	37.50%	5,247	12.31%	792	1.86%	4,618	10.83%	42,631
Chester	73,046	60.92%	34,307	28.61%	10,911	9.10%	1,632	1.36%	38,739	32.31%	119,896
Clarion	8,812	58.35%	5,472	36.24%	678	4.49%	139	0.92%	3,340	22.11%	15,101
Clearfield	15,299	54.27%	11,647	41.31%	944	3.35%	302	1.07%	3,652	12.96%	28,192
Clinton	6,288	52.36%	4,842	40.32%	733	6.10%	147	1.22%	1,446	12.04%	12,010
Columbia	12,426	53.30%	9,449	40.53%	1,197	5.13%	241	1.03%	2,977	12.77%	23,313
Crawford	16,552	53.55%	11,778	38.11%	2,095	6.78%	484	1.57%	4,774	15.44%	30,909
Cumberland	41,152	61.18%	19,789	29.42%	5,437	8.08%	882	1.31%	21,363	31.76%	67,260
Dauphin	44,039	56.18%	27,252	34.77%	6,034	7.70%	1,062	1.35%	16,787	21.41%	78,387
Delaware	143,282	55.78%	88,314	34.38%	20,907	8.14%	4,356	1.70%	54,968	21.40%	256,859
Elk	7,175	52.49%	5,898	43.15%	472	3.45%	124	0.91%	1,277	9.34%	13,669
Erie	48,918	47.42%	45,946	44.54%	6,349	6.15%	1,949	1.89%	2,972	2.88%	103,162
Fayette	19,252	38.99%	27,963	56.62%	1,348	2.73%	820	1.66%	-8,711	-17.63%	49,383
Forest	1,206	56.12%	819	38.11%	93	4.33%	31	1.44%	387	18.01%	2,149
Franklin	22,716	61.83%	12,061	32.83%	1,724	4.69%	240	0.65%	10,655	29.00%	36,741
Fulton	2,740	64.90%	1,342	31.79%	107	2.53%	33	0.78%	1,398	33.11%	4,222
Greene	5,336	37.79%	8,193	58.02%	450	3.19%	142	1.01%	-2,857	-20.23%	14,121
Huntingdon	8,140	58.44%	5,094	36.57%	567	4.07%	127	0.91%	3,046	21.87%	13,928
Indiana	15,607	49.62%	13,828	43.97%	1,708	5.43%	308	0.98%	1,779	5.65%	31,451
Jefferson	9,628	57.38%	6,296	37.53%	687	4.09%	167	1.00%	3,332	19.85%	16,778
Juniata	4,139	57.80%	2,696	37.65%	280	3.91%	46	0.64%	1,443	20.15%	7,161
Lackawanna	44,242	46.35%	45,257	47.42%	4,209	4.41%	1,739	1.82%	-1,015	-1.07%	95,447
Lancaster	79,963	67.25%	30,026	25.25%	7,442	6.26%	1,466	1.23%	49,937	42.00%	118,897
Lawrence	18,404	45.77%	19,506	48.51%	1,908	4.74%	395	0.98%	-1,102	-2.74%	40,213
Lebanon	24,495	68.99%	8,281	23.32%	2,314	6.52%	417	1.17%	16,214	45.67%	35,507
Lehigh	50,782	52.91%	34,827	36.28%	8,977	9.35%	1,399	1.46%	15,955	16.63%	95,985
Luzerne	67,822	50.21%	59,976	44.40%	4,947	3.66%	2,335	1.73%	7,846	5.81%	135,080
Lycoming	23,415	57.74%	14,609	36.02%	2,034	5.02%	495	1.22%	8,806	21.72%	40,553
McKean	9,229	60.85%	5,064	33.39%	661	4.36%	212	1.40%	4,165	27.46%	15,166
Mercer	22,372	48.54%	19,716	42.78%	3,247	7.04%	755	1.64%	2,656	5.76%	46,090
Mifflin	7,541	55.78%	5,226	38.65%	578	4.28%	175	1.29%	2,315	17.13%	13,520
Monroe	12,357	55.44%	7,551	33.88%	1,967	8.82%	414	1.86%	4,806	21.56%	22,289
Montgomery	156,996	57.81%	84,289	31.04%	26,133	9.62%	4,135	1.52%	72,707	26.77%	271,553
Montour	3,399	55.76%	2,272	37.27%	375	6.15%	50	0.82%	1,127	18.49%	6,096
Northampton	35,787	47.07%	31,920	41.98%	6,823	8.97%	1,507	1.98%	3,867	5.09%	76,037
Northumberland	20,608	56.79%	13,750	37.89%	1,515	4.17%	417	1.15%	6,858	18.90%	36,290
Perry	8,026	63.70%	3,681	29.22%	717	5.69%	175	1.39%	4,345	34.48%	12,599
Philadelphia	244,108	33.99%	421,253	58.66%	42,967	5.98%	9,772	1.36%	-177,145	-24.67%	718,100
Pike	5,249	65.83%	2,132	26.74%	452	5.67%	140	1.76%	3,117	39.09%	7,973
Potter	4,073	61.07%	2,299	34.47%	225	3.37%	72	1.08%	1,774	26.60%	6,669
Schuylkill	36,273	55.83%	24,968	38.43%	3,079	4.74%	649	1.00%	11,305	17.40%	64,969
Snyder	7,634	72.08%	2,418	22.83%	451	4.26%	88	0.83%	5,216	49.25%	10,591
Somerset	17,729	58.21%	11,695	38.40%	815	2.68%	216	0.71%	6,034	19.81%	30,455
Sullivan	1,676	57.75%	1,074	37.01%	130	4.48%	22	0.76%	602	20.74%	2,902
Susquehanna	8,994	61.23%	4,660	31.72%	786	5.35%	249	1.70%	4,334	29.51%	14,689
Tioga	8,770	63.33%	4,273	30.85%	664	4.79%	142	1.03%	4,497	32.48%	13,849
Union	6,798	66.28%	2,687	26.20%	628	6.12%	143	1.39%	4,111	40.08%	10,256
Venango	11,547	56.04%	7,800	37.86%	1,015	4.93%	242	1.17%	3,747	18.18%	20,604
Warren	9,165	57.37%	5,560	34.81%	922	5.77%	327	2.05%	3,605	22.56%	15,974
Washington	32,532	39.66%	45,295	55.23%	3,413	4.16%	778	0.95%	-12,763	-15.57%	82,018
Wayne	8,468	67.48%	3,375	26.90%	496	3.95%	209	1.67%	5,093	40.58%	12,548
Westmoreland	63,140	45.06%	68,627	48.97%	5,985	4.27%	2,387	1.70%	-5,487	-3.91%	140,139
Wyoming	5,919	64.57%	2,766	30.17%	384	4.19%	98	1.07%	3,153	34.40%	9,167
York	61,098	59.96%	33,406	32.79%	5,779	5.67%	1,608	1.58%	27,692	27.17%	101,891
Totals	2,261,872	49.59%	1,937,540	42.48%	292,921	6.42%	69,168	1.52%	324,332	7.11%	4,561,501

==== Counties that flipped from Democratic to Republican ====
- Armstrong
- Carbon
- Clearfield
- Clinton
- Columbia
- Elk
- Erie
- Luzerne
- Mercer
- Northampton
- Schuylkill

== See also ==
- United States presidential elections in Pennsylvania
