= 1988 United States presidential election in Pennsylvania =

- November 8, 1988
- Turnout: 77.2% ▼1.0 pp

Nominee	George H. W. Bush	Michael Dukakis
Party	Republican	Democratic
Home state	Texas	Massachusetts
Running mate	Dan Quayle	Lloyd Bentsen
Electoral vote	25	0
Popular vote	2,300,087	2,194,944
Percentage	50.70%	48.39%

Bush
50–60%
60–70%
70–80%
80–90%
Dukakis
40–50%
50–60%
60–70%
70–80%
80–90%
90–100%
Tie
40–50%
No Vote/Data
President before election
Ronald Reagan
Republican
Elected President
George H. W. Bush
Republican

The 1988 United States presidential election in Pennsylvania took place on November 8, 1988, and was part of the 1988 United States presidential election. Voters chose 25 representatives, or electors to the Electoral College, who voted for president and vice president.

Pennsylvania voted for the Republican nominee, Vice President George H. W. Bush, over the Democratic nominee, Massachusetts governor Michael Dukakis. Bush won Pennsylvania by a narrow margin of 2.31%, which made it about 5.5% more Democratic than the nation. This was the last election where Pennsylvania would be carried by a Republican presidential candidate until 2016 and the last in which a Republican would win a majority of the statewide vote until 2024. As of 2024, Bush's 2.31% margin has not been exceeded by any Republican thus far. This is also the last time Pennsylvania, along with Michigan, would vote differently to fellow Rust Belt swing state Wisconsin, as all three had Democratic winning streaks from 1992 to 2012, with all three states flipping simultaneously in 2016, 2020, and 2024.

== Primaries ==
=== Republican primary ===
Candidate	Votes	Percent
George H. W. Bush	687,323	78.95%
Bob Dole	103,763	11.92%
Pat Robertson	79,463	9.13%
Totals	870,549	Turnout: 38.18%

=== Democratic primary ===
Candidate	Votes	Percent
Michael Dukakis	1,002,480	66.49%
Jesse Jackson	411,260	27.28%
Al Gore	44,542	2.95%
Others	49,408	3.28%
Totals	1,507,690	Turnout: 52.93%

== Results ==
1988 United States presidential election in Pennsylvania
Party	Candidate	Votes	Percentage	Electoral votes
Republican	George H. W. Bush	2,300,087	50.70%	25
Democratic	Michael Dukakis	2,194,944	48.39%	0
Consumer	Eugene McCarthy	19,158	0.42%	0
Libertarian	Ron Paul	12,051	0.27%	0
New Alliance	Lenora Fulani	4,379	0.10%	0
America First	David Duke	3,444	0.08%	0
Workers' League	Edward Winn	2,188	0.05%	0
Totals		4,536,251	100.00%	25

=== Results by county ===
County	George H. W. Bush Republican		Michael Dukakis Democratic		Various candidates Other parties		Margin		Total votes cast
County	#	%	#	%	#	%	#	%	Total votes cast
Adams	15,650	64.92%	8,299	34.43%	156	0.65%	7,351	30.49%	24,105
Allegheny	231,137	39.43%	348,814	59.51%	6,200	1.06%	-117,677	-20.08%	586,151
Armstrong	11,509	44.81%	13,892	54.09%	282	1.10%	-2,383	-9.28%	25,683
Beaver	25,764	33.69%	50,327	65.81%	378	0.49%	-24,563	-32.12%	76,469
Bedford	11,123	65.55%	5,754	33.91%	92	0.54%	5,369	31.64%	16,969
Berks	70,153	62.39%	41,040	36.50%	1,251	1.11%	29,113	25.89%	112,444
Blair	25,623	61.50%	15,588	37.42%	451	1.08%	10,035	24.08%	41,662
Bradford	13,568	66.72%	6,635	32.63%	134	0.66%	6,933	34.09%	20,337
Bucks	127,563	59.99%	82,472	38.78%	2,605	1.23%	45,091	21.21%	212,640
Butler	27,777	54.82%	22,341	44.09%	549	1.08%	5,436	10.73%	50,667
Cambria	25,626	39.70%	38,517	59.67%	409	0.63%	-12,891	-19.97%	64,552
Cameron	1,731	65.20%	901	33.94%	23	0.87%	830	31.26%	2,655
Carbon	10,232	52.35%	9,104	46.57%	211	1.08%	1,128	5.78%	19,547
Centre	23,875	56.14%	18,357	43.17%	295	0.69%	5,518	12.97%	42,527
Chester	93,522	67.00%	44,853	32.13%	1,210	0.87%	48,669	34.87%	139,585
Clarion	8,026	58.37%	5,616	40.84%	109	0.79%	2,410	17.53%	13,751
Clearfield	14,296	53.52%	12,235	45.80%	182	0.68%	2,061	7.72%	26,713
Clinton	5,735	49.38%	5,759	49.59%	119	1.02%	-24	-0.21%	11,613
Columbia	12,114	60.51%	7,767	38.79%	140	0.70%	4,347	21.72%	20,021
Crawford	17,249	56.32%	13,021	42.51%	358	1.17%	4,228	13.81%	30,628
Cumberland	47,292	65.29%	24,613	33.98%	528	0.73%	22,679	31.31%	72,433
Dauphin	48,917	57.77%	35,079	41.43%	681	0.80%	13,838	16.34%	84,677
Delaware	147,656	59.95%	96,144	39.03%	2,505	1.02%	51,512	20.92%	246,305
Elk	6,737	52.86%	5,879	46.13%	128	1.00%	858	6.73%	12,744
Erie	48,306	46.76%	53,913	52.19%	1,081	1.05%	-5,607	-5.43%	103,300
Fayette	16,915	33.60%	33,098	65.74%	336	0.67%	-16,183	-32.14%	50,349
Forest	1,159	56.13%	895	43.34%	11	0.53%	264	12.79%	2,065
Franklin	27,086	68.32%	12,368	31.20%	190	0.48%	14,718	37.12%	39,644
Fulton	3,086	66.42%	1,532	32.97%	28	0.60%	1,554	33.45%	4,646
Greene	4,879	34.62%	9,126	64.75%	90	0.64%	-4,247	-30.13%	14,095
Huntingdon	8,800	64.56%	4,752	34.86%	79	0.58%	4,048	29.70%	13,631
Indiana	14,983	47.21%	16,514	52.03%	242	0.76%	-1,531	-4.82%	31,739
Jefferson	9,743	60.48%	6,235	38.71%	131	0.81%	3,508	21.77%	16,109
Juniata	4,881	62.87%	2,834	36.50%	49	0.63%	2,047	26.37%	7,764
Lackawanna	42,083	47.42%	45,591	51.38%	1,067	1.20%	-3,508	-3.96%	88,741
Lancaster	96,979	70.77%	38,982	28.45%	1,068	0.78%	57,997	42.32%	137,029
Lawrence	15,829	41.76%	21,884	57.74%	191	0.50%	-6,055	-15.98%	37,904
Lebanon	24,415	66.69%	11,912	32.54%	281	0.77%	12,503	34.15%	36,608
Lehigh	56,363	56.30%	42,801	42.76%	943	0.94%	13,562	13.54%	100,107
Luzerne	59,059	50.01%	58,553	49.58%	480	0.41%	506	0.43%	118,092
Lycoming	24,792	64.00%	13,528	34.92%	415	1.07%	11,264	29.08%	38,735
McKean	9,323	63.22%	5,300	35.94%	124	0.84%	4,023	27.28%	14,747
Mercer	21,301	46.43%	24,278	52.92%	301	0.66%	-2,977	-6.49%	45,880
Mifflin	8,170	62.49%	4,790	36.63%	115	0.88%	3,380	25.86%	13,075
Monroe	17,185	62.79%	9,859	36.02%	327	1.19%	7,326	26.77%	27,371
Montgomery	170,294	60.20%	109,834	38.83%	2,742	0.97%	60,460	21.37%	282,870
Montour	3,617	63.50%	2,031	35.66%	48	0.84%	1,586	27.84%	5,696
Northampton	42,748	51.52%	39,264	47.32%	966	1.16%	3,484	4.20%	82,978
Northumberland	20,207	58.07%	14,255	40.96%	338	0.97%	5,952	17.11%	34,800
Perry	8,545	68.18%	3,910	31.20%	78	0.62%	4,635	36.98%	12,533
Philadelphia	219,053	32.45%	449,566	66.60%	6,358	0.94%	-230,513	-34.15%	674,977
Pike	6,659	67.15%	3,097	31.23%	161	1.62%	3,562	35.92%	9,917
Potter	4,432	67.23%	2,119	32.15%	41	0.62%	2,313	35.08%	6,592
Schuylkill	32,666	56.47%	24,797	42.87%	379	0.66%	7,869	13.60%	57,842
Snyder	9,054	76.87%	2,658	22.57%	67	0.57%	6,396	54.30%	11,779
Somerset	16,809	54.63%	13,815	44.90%	144	0.47%	2,994	9.73%	30,768
Sullivan	1,808	61.88%	1,091	37.34%	23	0.79%	717	24.54%	2,922
Susquehanna	9,077	64.58%	4,871	34.65%	108	0.77%	4,206	29.93%	14,056
Tioga	9,471	66.00%	4,807	33.50%	72	0.50%	4,664	32.50%	14,350
Union	7,912	71.05%	3,163	28.40%	61	0.55%	4,749	42.65%	11,136
Venango	11,468	56.60%	8,624	42.56%	171	0.84%	2,844	14.04%	20,263
Warren	8,991	56.21%	6,790	42.45%	214	1.34%	2,201	13.76%	15,995
Washington	28,651	37.43%	47,527	62.08%	375	0.49%	-18,876	-24.65%	76,553
Wayne	9,926	71.61%	3,775	27.23%	161	1.16%	6,151	44.38%	13,862
Westmoreland	61,472	44.13%	76,710	55.07%	1,108	0.80%	-15,238	-10.94%	139,290
Wyoming	6,607	69.94%	2,797	29.61%	43	0.46%	3,810	40.33%	9,447
York	72,408	65.16%	37,691	33.92%	1,017	0.92%	34,717	31.24%	111,116
Totals	2,300,087	50.70%	2,194,944	48.39%	41,220	0.91%	105,143	2.31%	4,536,251

==== Counties that flipped from Republican to Democratic ====
- Clinton
- Erie
- Indiana
- Lackawanna

== Analysis ==
As of the 2024 presidential election, this is the last election in which Lehigh County or the Greater Philadelphia suburban counties of Montgomery and Delaware have voted Republican at the presidential level. Northampton and Luzerne counties would not vote Republican again until 2016, while Bucks County would not do so again until 2024. This is the last time that Erie County voted for the statewide loser, and the only time it has done so since 1948. Bush became the only Republican to date to win the White House without carrying Indiana County, and the only one to do so without carrying Clinton County since Benjamin Harrison in 1888. This was also the first election since 1932 where Pennsylvania did not vote the same as neighboring New York, another phenomenon that would not occur again until 2016 and 2024.

== See also ==
- United States presidential elections in Pennsylvania
