= 2016 United States presidential election in Pennsylvania =

- November 8, 2016
- Turnout: 70.1% (▲2.5 pp)

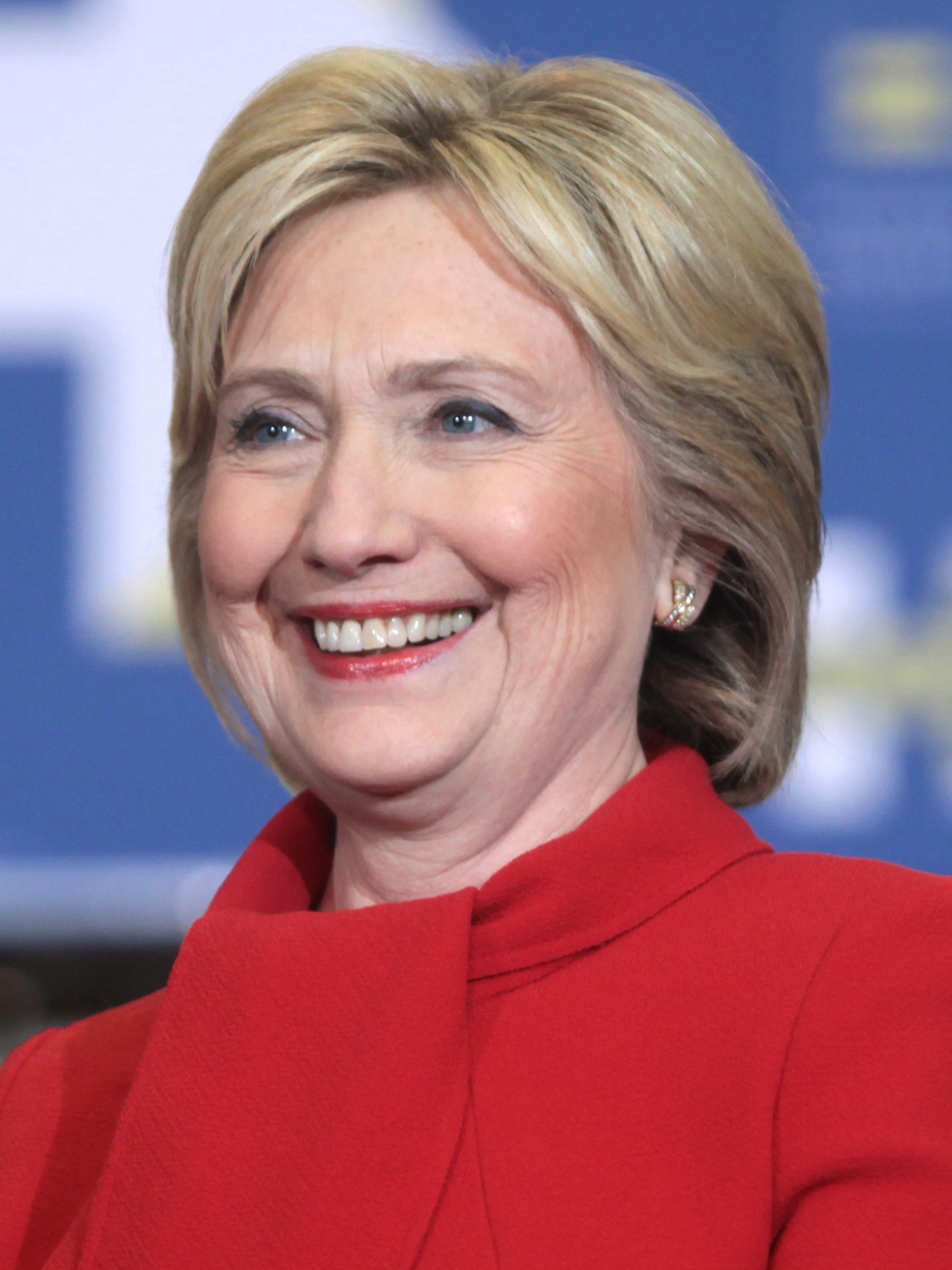
Nominee	Donald Trump	Hillary Clinton
Party	Republican	Democratic
Home state	New York	New York
Running mate	Mike Pence	Tim Kaine
Electoral vote	20	0
Popular vote	2,970,733	2,926,441
Percentage	48.18%	47.46%

Trump
40–50%
50–60%
60–70%
70–80%
80–90%
90–100%
Clinton
40–50%
50–60%
60–70%
70–80%
80–90%
90–100%
Tie/No Data
President before election
Barack Obama
Democratic
Elected President
Donald Trump
Republican

Treemap of the popular vote by county

The 2016 United States presidential election in Pennsylvania took place on November 8, 2016, as part of the 2016 United States elections in which all 50 states and the District of Columbia participated. Pennsylvania voters chose electors to represent them in the Electoral College via a popular vote.

On April 26, 2016, in the presidential primaries, voters selected the Democratic, Republican, and Green parties' respective nominees for president. Pennsylvania is a closed primary state, meaning voters must have been previously registered with a particular political party in order to vote for one of that parties' candidates, to participate in their respective party primary.

In the general election, Donald Trump, the Republican nominee, won Pennsylvania by 44,292 votes out of more than 6 million cast, a margin of 0.72% and the narrowest margin in a presidential election since 1840, when William Henry Harrison defeated Martin Van Buren by just 0.12%. Pennsylvania voted 2.82% more Republican than the nation-at-large, marking the first time since 1948 that it voted to the right of the nation.

Before the election, Pennsylvania was expected to be close as polling showed the results within the margin of error, but many election experts viewed that Clinton had an edge. However, on Election Day, Pennsylvania unexpectedly swung to Donald Trump. Trump carried 56 of the state's 67 counties, predominantly rural or suburban counties, while Clinton carried much of the Philadelphia metropolitan area as well as other cities including Pittsburgh, Harrisburg and Scranton. Nonetheless, some areas of traditional Democratic strength such as Luzerne County, where Wilkes-Barre is located, saw swings in margins of up to 25% toward Donald Trump.

Trump was the first Republican nominee for president to win the state of Pennsylvania since George H. W. Bush in 1988. Later in 2024, Trump also became the first Republican to win a majority of the vote in the state since Bush in 1988.

== Primaries ==
=== Democratic primary ===
Results of the Democratic primary by county Hillary Clinton Bernie Sanders

Pennsylvania Democratic primary, April 26, 2016
Candidate	Popular vote		Estimated delegates		
Candidate	Count	Percentage	Pledged	Unpledged	Total
Hillary Clinton	935,107	55.61%	106	20	126
Bernie Sanders	731,881	43.53%	83	0	83
Rocky De La Fuente	14,439	0.86%	0	0	0
Total	1,681,427	100%	189	20	209

=== Republican primary ===
Republican primary results by county Donald Trump: 40–50%; 50–60%; 60–70%; 70–80%

Pennsylvania Republican primary, April 26, 2016
Candidate	Votes	Percentage	Actual delegate count		
Candidate	Votes	Percentage	Bound	Unbound	Total
Donald Trump	902,593	56.61%	17	42	59
Ted Cruz	345,506	21.67%	0	4	4
John Kasich	310,003	19.44%	0	3	3
Ben Carson (withdrawn)	14,842	0.93%	0	0	0
Marco Rubio (withdrawn)	11,954	0.75%	0	0	0
Jeb Bush (withdrawn)	9,577	0.60%	0	0	0
Unprojected delegates:			0	5	5
Total:	1,594,475	100.00%	17	54	71

=== Green Party ===
Pennsylvania held a series of caucuses throughout April, culminating with a meeting on April 30 in Harrisburg, Pennsylvania, where delegates were assigned.

Pennsylvania Green Party presidential caucuses, April 17, 2016
Candidate	Votes	Percentage	National delegates
Jill Stein	-	-	8
William Kreml	-	-	1
Sedinam Kinamo Christin Moyowasifza Curry	-	-	-
Darryl Cherney	-	-	-
Kent Mesplay	-	-	-
Total	-	100.00%	9

== Democratic National Convention ==
From July 25 to July 28, 2016, Philadelphia hosted the 2016 Democratic National Convention. It was held at the Wells Fargo Center with ancillary meetings at the Pennsylvania Convention Center. Former Secretary of State Hillary Clinton was chosen as the party's nominee for president by a 59.67% majority of delegates present at the convention roll call, winning the nomination, while runner-up rival Senator Bernie Sanders received 39.16% of votes from delegates. Clinton then became the first female candidate to be formally nominated by a major national party as a presidential candidate in the United States. Her running mate, Senator Tim Kaine, the junior United States senator from Virginia, was chosen by delegates as the party's nominee for vice president by acclamation.

== General election ==
=== Predictions ===
Source	Ranking	As of
CNN	Lean D	November 4, 2016
Cook Political Report	Lean D	November 7, 2016
Electoral-vote.com	Lean D	November 6, 2016
NBC	Lean D	November 7, 2016
RealClearPolitics	Tossup	November 6, 2016
Rothenberg Political Report	Lean D	November 7, 2016
Sabato's Crystal Ball	Lean D	November 7, 2016

=== Results ===
2016 United States presidential election in Pennsylvania
Party	Candidate	Votes	%
Republican	Donald Trump; Mike Pence	2,970,733	48.18
Democratic	Hillary Clinton; Tim Kaine	2,926,441	47.46
Libertarian	Gary Johnson; Bill Weld	146,715	2.38
Green	Jill Stein; Ajamu Baraka	49,941	0.81
Constitution	Darrell L. Castle; Scott N. Bradley	21,572	0.35
Independent	Evan McMullin (write-in); Mindy Finn (write-in)	6,472	0.10
Independent	Bernie Sanders (write-in)	6,060	0.10
Republican	John Kasich (write-in)	302	0.00
Independent	Lynn Kahn (write-in); Kathleen Monahan (write-in)	3	0.00
Write-in		37,239	0.60
Total votes		6,165,478	100%
Republican win			

==== By county ====
County	Donald Trump Republican		Hillary Clinton Democratic		Gary Johnson Libertarian		Jill Stein Green		Darrell Castle Constitution		Various candidates Other parties		Margin		Total votes cast
County	#	%	#	%	#	%	#	%	#	%	#	%	#	%	Total votes cast
Adams	31,423	65.48%	14,219	29.63%	1,251	2.61%	405	0.84%	191	0.40%	501	1.04%	17,204	35.85%	47,990
Allegheny	259,480	39.48%	367,617	55.94%	16,102	2.45%	5,097	0.78%	1,818	0.28%	7,075	1.08%	-108,137	-16.46%	657,189
Armstrong	23,484	73.70%	7,178	22.53%	685	2.15%	141	0.44%	130	0.41%	246	0.77%	16,306	51.17%	31,864
Beaver	48,167	57.03%	32,531	38.52%	2,022	2.39%	496	0.59%	355	0.42%	891	1.05%	15,636	18.51%	84,462
Bedford	19,552	82.59%	3,645	15.40%	260	1.10%	102	0.43%	78	0.33%	38	0.16%	15,907	67.19%	23,675
Berks	96,626	52.49%	78,437	42.61%	5,247	2.85%	1,974	1.07%	781	0.42%	1,020	0.55%	18,189	9.88%	184,085
Blair	39,135	70.72%	13,958	25.22%	1,256	2.27%	338	0.61%	222	0.40%	432	0.79%	25,177	45.50%	55,341
Bradford	18,141	69.81%	6,369	24.51%	893	3.44%	137	0.53%	168	0.65%	278	1.07%	11,772	45.30%	25,986
Bucks	164,361	47.64%	167,060	48.42%	8,556	2.48%	3,121	0.90%	1,199	0.35%	745	0.22%	-2,699	-0.78%	345,042
Butler	64,431	65.71%	28,586	29.15%	3,064	3.12%	615	0.63%	382	0.39%	973	0.99%	35,845	36.56%	98,051
Cambria	42,258	66.45%	18,867	29.67%	1,270	2.00%	413	0.65%	264	0.42%	517	0.81%	23,391	36.78%	63,589
Cameron	1,589	71.90%	531	24.03%	53	2.40%	6	0.27%	7	0.32%	24	1.09%	1,058	47.87%	2,210
Carbon	18,743	64.65%	8,936	30.82%	691	2.38%	265	0.91%	141	0.49%	217	0.75%	9,807	33.83%	28,993
Centre	35,274	45.63%	37,088	47.97%	2,644	3.42%	798	1.03%	344	0.44%	1,159	0.94%	-1,814	-2.34%	77,307
Chester	116,114	42.53%	141,682	51.90%	7,930	2.90%	2,247	0.82%	827	0.30%	4,198	1.54%	-25,568	-9.37%	272,998
Clarion	12,576	71.21%	4,273	24.20%	469	2.66%	115	0.65%	102	0.58%	125	0.71%	8,303	47.01%	17,660
Clearfield	24,932	72.16%	8,200	23.73%	776	2.25%	220	0.64%	143	0.41%	279	0.81%	16,732	48.43%	34,550
Clinton	10,022	64.64%	4,744	30.60%	470	3.03%	121	0.78%	37	0.24%	111	0.71%	5,278	34.04%	15,505
Columbia	18,004	63.16%	8,934	31.34%	883	3.10%	265	0.93%	142	0.50%	278	0.97%	9,070	31.82%	28,506
Crawford	24,987	66.08%	10,971	29.01%	1,046	2.77%	271	0.72%	217	0.57%	321	0.85%	14,016	37.07%	37,813
Cumberland	69,076	55.94%	47,085	38.13%	3,975	3.22%	939	0.76%	542	0.44%	1,869	1.51%	21,991	17.81%	123,486
Dauphin	60,863	46.18%	64,706	49.10%	3,498	2.65%	1,177	0.89%	628	0.48%	911	0.69%	-3,843	-2.92%	131,783
Delaware	110,667	36.97%	177,402	59.27%	5,992	2.00%	2,588	0.86%	985	0.33%	1,702	0.57%	-66,735	-22.30%	299,336
Elk	10,025	68.91%	3,853	26.49%	401	2.76%	79	0.54%	68	0.47%	121	0.83%	6,172	42.42%	14,547
Erie	60,069	48.01%	58,112	46.44%	3,871	3.09%	1,139	0.91%	488	0.39%	1,450	1.16%	1,957	1.57%	125,129
Fayette	34,590	63.94%	17,946	33.17%	853	1.58%	232	0.43%	146	0.27%	332	0.61%	16,644	30.77%	54,099
Forest	1,684	69.59%	626	25.87%	60	2.48%	19	0.79%	13	0.54%	18	0.74%	1,058	43.72%	2,420
Franklin	49,768	70.59%	17,465	24.77%	1,712	2.43%	450	0.64%	336	0.48%	775	1.10%	32,303	45.82%	70,506
Fulton	5,694	83.47%	912	13.37%	93	1.36%	37	0.54%	35	0.51%	51	0.75%	4,782	70.10%	6,822
Greene	10,849	68.37%	4,482	28.25%	284	1.79%	83	0.52%	66	0.42%	104	0.66%	6,367	40.12%	15,868
Huntingdon	14,494	72.96%	4,539	22.85%	425	2.14%	96	0.48%	152	0.77%	160	0.81%	9,955	50.11%	19,866
Indiana	24,888	65.29%	11,528	30.24%	936	2.46%	220	0.58%	198	0.52%	352	0.92%	13,360	35.05%	38,122
Jefferson	15,192	77.53%	3,650	18.63%	432	2.20%	110	0.56%	94	0.48%	117	0.60%	11,542	58.90%	19,595
Juniata	8,273	78.45%	1,821	17.27%	201	1.91%	71	0.67%	88	0.83%	91	0.86%	6,452	61.18%	10,545
Lackawanna	48,384	46.34%	51,983	49.79%	1,935	1.85%	896	0.86%	258	0.25%	948	0.91%	-3,599	-3.45%	104,404
Lancaster	137,914	56.33%	91,093	37.21%	8,555	3.49%	2,021	0.83%	1,529	0.62%	3,720	1.52%	46,821	19.12%	244,832
Lawrence	25,428	61.90%	14,009	34.11%	870	2.12%	248	0.60%	198	0.48%	323	0.79%	11,419	27.79%	41,076
Lebanon	40,525	64.84%	18,953	30.32%	1,647	2.64%	422	0.68%	298	0.48%	658	1.05%	21,572	34.52%	62,503
Lehigh	73,690	45.28%	81,324	49.97%	4,027	2.47%	1,402	0.86%	550	0.34%	1,740	1.07%	-7,634	-4.69%	162,733
Luzerne	78,688	57.90%	52,451	38.60%	2,339	1.72%	1,178	0.87%	327	0.24%	918	0.68%	26,237	19.30%	135,901
Lycoming	35,627	69.68%	13,020	25.46%	1,311	2.56%	384	0.75%	223	0.44%	566	1.11%	22,607	44.22%	51,131
McKean	11,635	70.67%	4,025	24.45%	408	2.48%	151	0.92%	77	0.47%	168	1.02%	7,610	46.22%	16,464
Mercer	31,544	59.70%	18,733	35.45%	1,370	2.59%	415	0.79%	247	0.47%	530	1.00%	12,811	24.25%	52,839
Mifflin	14,094	75.28%	3,877	20.71%	476	2.54%	80	0.43%	74	0.40%	120	0.64%	10,217	54.57%	18,721
Monroe	33,386	47.69%	33,918	48.45%	1,502	2.15%	758	1.08%	188	0.27%	256	0.36%	-532	-0.76%	70,008
Montgomery	162,731	37.10%	256,082	58.38%	10,934	2.49%	3,704	0.84%	1,236	0.28%	3,965	0.90%	-93,351	-21.28%	438,652
Montour	5,288	61.80%	2,857	33.39%	287	3.35%	73	0.85%	51	0.60%	0	0.00%	2,431	28.41%	8,556
Northampton	71,736	49.62%	66,275	45.84%	3,690	2.55%	1,371	0.95%	450	0.31%	1,047	0.72%	5,461	3.78%	144,569
Northumberland	25,427	68.89%	9,788	26.52%	931	2.52%	296	0.80%	180	0.49%	285	0.77%	15,639	42.37%	36,907
Perry	15,616	73.07%	4,632	21.67%	619	2.90%	163	0.76%	128	0.60%	213	1.00%	10,984	51.40%	21,371
Philadelphia	108,748	15.32%	584,025	82.30%	7,115	1.00%	6,679	0.94%	1,064	0.15%	1,987	0.28%	-475,277	-66.98%	709,618
Pike	16,061	61.06%	9,268	35.24%	494	1.88%	226	0.86%	71	0.27%	183	0.70%	6,793	25.82%	26,303
Potter	6,251	79.49%	1,302	16.56%	165	2.10%	35	0.45%	31	0.39%	80	1.01%	4,949	62.93%	7,864
Schuylkill	44,001	69.42%	16,770	26.46%	1,414	2.23%	449	0.71%	235	0.37%	516	0.81%	27,231	42.96%	63,385
Snyder	11,725	71.12%	4,002	24.28%	455	2.76%	111	0.67%	70	0.42%	123	0.75%	7,723	46.84%	16,486
Somerset	27,379	75.90%	7,376	20.45%	678	1.88%	166	0.46%	174	0.48%	300	0.83%	20,003	55.45%	36,073
Sullivan	2,291	72.68%	750	23.79%	65	2.06%	14	0.44%	16	0.51%	16	0.51%	1,541	48.89%	3,152
Susquehanna	12,891	67.69%	5,123	26.90%	568	2.98%	192	1.01%	89	0.47%	180	0.95%	7,768	40.79%	19,043
Tioga	13,614	73.56%	3,901	21.08%	548	2.96%	139	0.75%	123	0.66%	182	0.98%	9,713	52.48%	18,507
Union	10,622	60.02%	6,180	34.92%	450	2.54%	143	0.81%	73	0.41%	228	1.29%	4,442	25.43%	17,696
Venango	16,021	68.09%	6,309	26.81%	733	3.12%	149	0.63%	136	0.58%	182	0.77%	9,712	41.28%	23,530
Warren	12,477	67.06%	5,145	27.65%	549	2.95%	130	0.70%	133	0.71%	172	0.92%	7,332	39.41%	18,606
Washington	61,386	60.03%	36,322	35.52%	2,643	2.58%	733	0.72%	366	0.36%	817	0.80%	25,064	24.51%	102,267
Wayne	16,244	67.63%	7,008	29.18%	466	1.94%	206	0.86%	94	0.39%	0	0.00%	9,236	38.45%	24,018
Westmoreland	116,522	63.50%	59,669	32.52%	4,367	2.38%	936	0.51%	557	0.30%	1,441	0.79%	56,853	30.98%	183,492
Wyoming	8,837	66.63%	3,811	28.74%	323	2.44%	116	0.87%	57	0.43%	118	0.89%	5,026	37.89%	13,262
York	128,528	61.78%	68,524	32.94%	6,484	3.12%	1,568	0.75%	882	0.42%	2,043	0.98%	60,004	28.84%	208,029
Totals	2,970,742	48.17%	2,926,458	47.45%	146,719	2.38%	49,941	0.81%	21,572	0.35%	51,506	0.83%	44,284	0.72%	6,166,938

Counties that flipped from Democratic to Republican

- Erie (largest city: Erie)
- Luzerne (largest city: Wilkes-Barre)
- Northampton (largest city: Bethlehem)

Counties that flipped from Republican to Democratic

- Chester (largest borough: West Chester)

==== By congressional district ====
Trump won 12 of 18 congressional districts, including one which elected a Democrat, while Clinton won six, including two that elected a Republican.

District	Trump	Clinton	Representative
1	18%	80%	Bob Brady
2	8%	90%	Chaka Fattah
2	8%	90%	Dwight Evans
3	61%	35%	Mike Kelly
4	59%	37%	Scott Perry
5	62%	34%	Glenn Thompson
6	48%	48%	Ryan Costello
7	47%	49%	Patrick Meehan
8	48%	48%	Mike Fitzpatrick
8	48%	48%	Brian Fitzpatrick
9	70%	27%	Bill Shuster
10	66%	30%	Tom Marino
11	60%	36%	Lou Barletta
12	59%	38%	Keith Rothfus
13	32%	65%	Brendan Boyle
14	31%	66%	Mike Doyle
15	52%	44%	Charlie Dent
16	51%	44%	Joe Pitts
16	51%	44%	Lloyd Smucker
17	53%	43%	Matt Cartwright
18	58%	39%	Tim Murphy

== Analysis ==
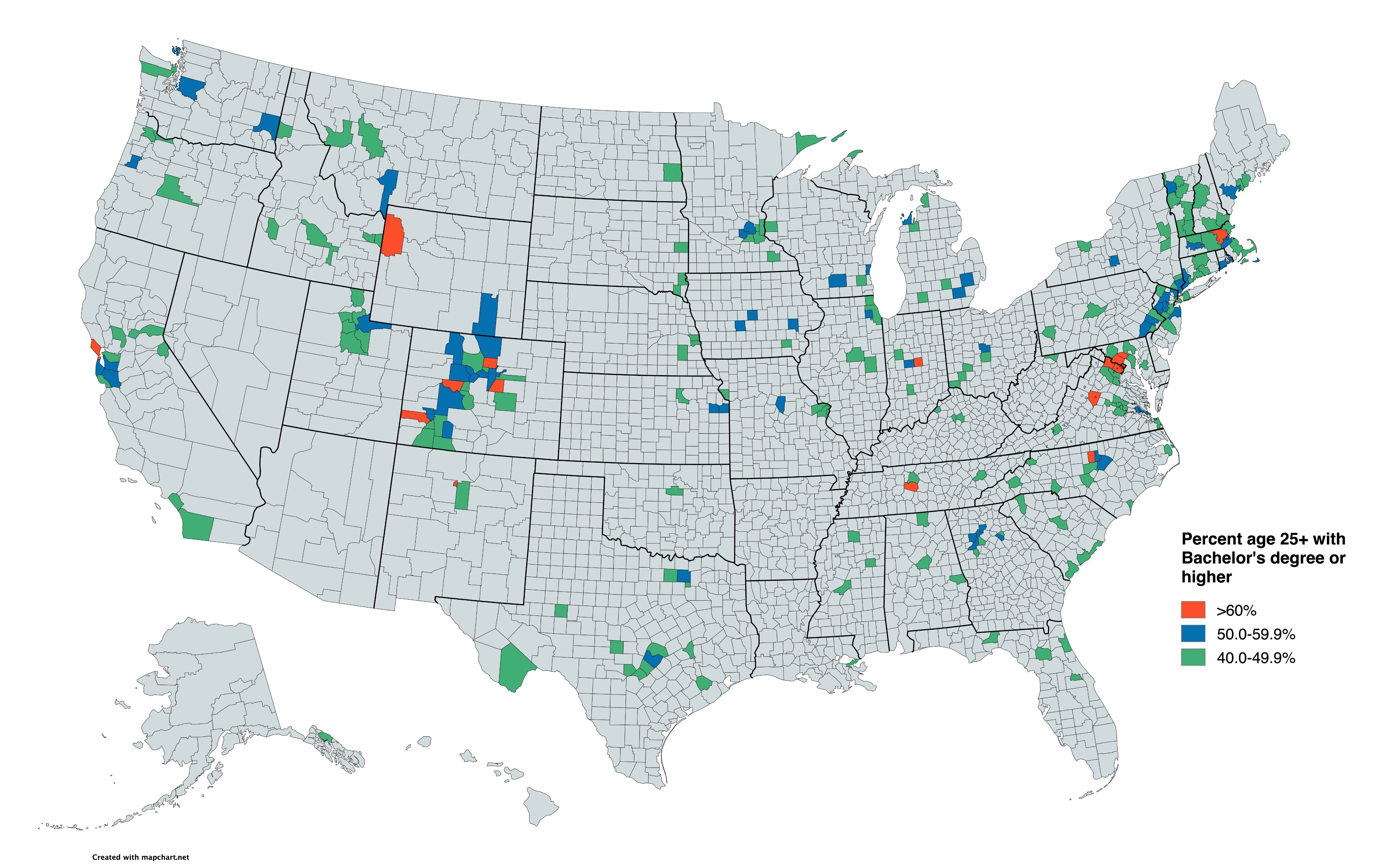
A map of the most college-educated counties in the United States

The 2016 presidential race is the only one since 1948 in which the Democratic nominee won the national popular vote without Pennsylvania. Pennsylvania's vote for Donald Trump, along with that of Wisconsin and Michigan, marked the fall of the Democratic Blue Wall, a bloc of over 240 electoral votes that voted solidly Democratic from 1992 to 2012. Pennsylvania was one of the eleven states to have voted twice for Bill Clinton in 1992 and 1996 which Hillary Clinton lost in 2016. Although Wisconsin eventually delivered the Trump victory, when the Clinton campaign learned that they had lost Pennsylvania, they knew that they had lost the election. While political analysts generally agree that Clinton met her turnout targets for Democratic voters, especially among the key counties of Bucks and Montgomery, Republican voter turnout was unexpectedly high in 2016, leading to a Trump win regardless of the Clinton campaign hitting their targets.

Except for the most college-educated counties in the state (see the map), Trump made massive gains. Chester and Montgomery counties swung significantly leftward, while Centre County (home to Pennsylvania State University) swung slightly leftward. Philadelphia County itself swung slightly rightward, though Clinton still won over 80% of the vote there. This prevented Clinton from winning the state, but it did keep Trump’s margin of victory below 1%.

Trump became the first Republican ever to win the White House without carrying Chester or Dauphin Counties, as well as the first to do so without carrying Centre County since Benjamin Harrison in 1888, and the first to do so without carrying Monroe County since Calvin Coolidge in 1924. He also became the first Republican to win Pennsylvania without carrying any of Philadelphia's suburban counties. Trump was the first Republican nominee for president to win Luzerne and Northampton counties since 1988. He was the first Republican to win Erie County since 1984. As of the 2024 presidential race, 2016 was the first time since 1996 that neither major party won a majority of the vote in Pennsylvania.

== See also ==
- United States presidential elections in Pennsylvania
- 2016 Democratic Party presidential debates and forums
- 2016 Democratic Party presidential primaries
- 2016 Republican Party presidential debates and forums
- 2016 Republican Party presidential primaries
