= 1948 United States presidential election in Pennsylvania =

- November 2, 1948
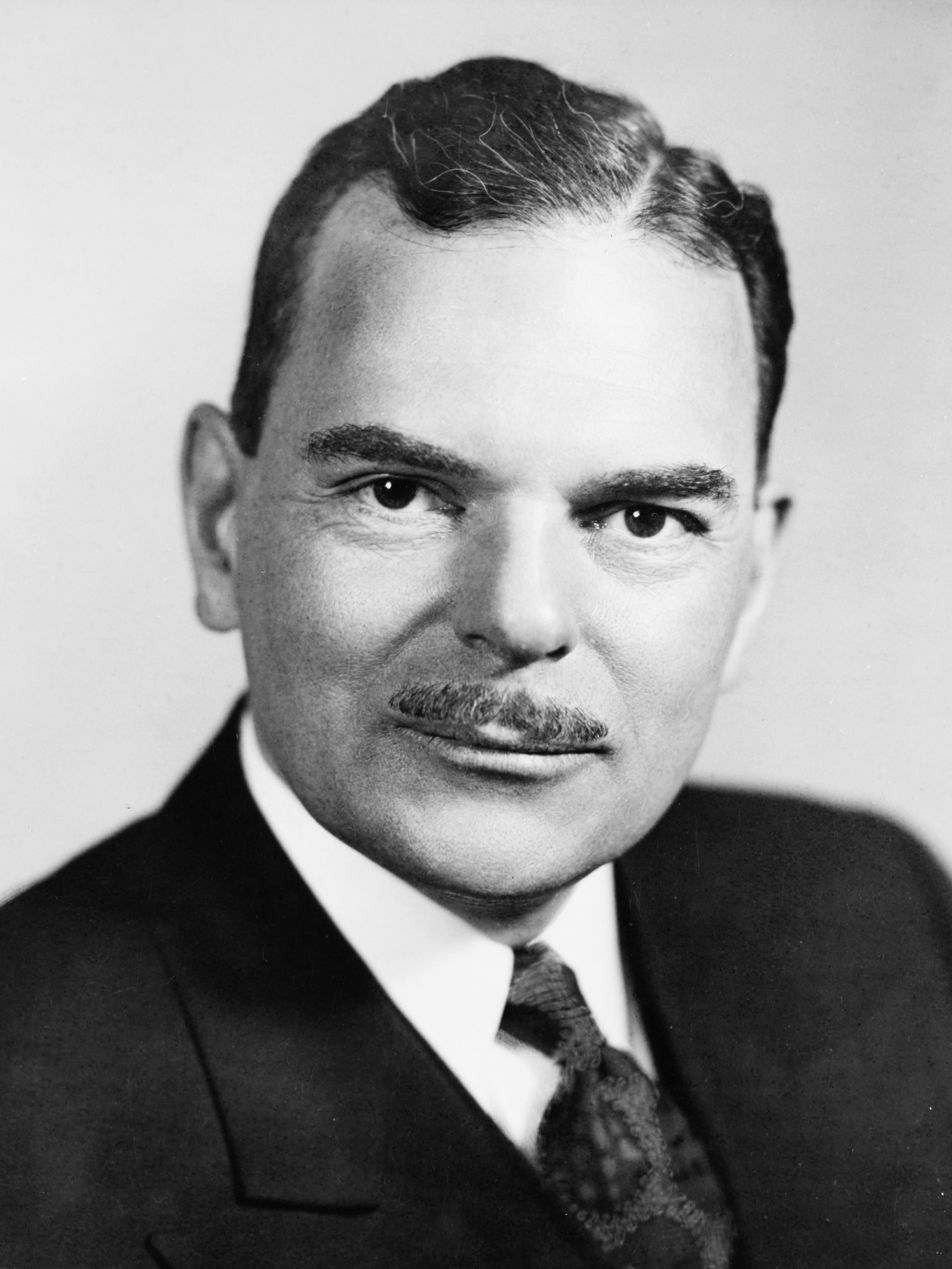

Nominee	Thomas E. Dewey	Harry S. Truman
Party	Republican	Democratic
Home state	New York	Missouri
Running mate	Earl Warren	Alben W. Barkley
Electoral vote	35	0
Popular vote	1,902,197	1,752,426
Percentage	50.93%	46.92%
County results
Dewey
40–50%
50–60%
60–70%
70–80%
Truman
40–50%
50–60%
60–70%
President before election
Harry S. Truman
Democratic
Elected President
Harry S. Truman
Democratic

The 1948 United States presidential election in Pennsylvania took place on November 2, 1948, as part of the 1948 United States presidential election. Voters chose 35 representatives, or electors to the Electoral College, who voted for president and vice president.

Pennsylvania voted for the Republican nominee, New York Governor Thomas E. Dewey, over the Democratic nominee, President Harry S. Truman. Dewey won Pennsylvania by a margin of 4.01%. As of the 2024 presidential election, this is the last time that a Democrat won the national election without carrying Pennsylvania, although in 2016, Democrats won the national popular vote without the state.

This is the last time any candidate of either party won Pennsylvania without carrying Northampton County, and the last time a Republican won Pennsylvania without carrying neighboring Ohio. Pennsylvania weighed in for this election as 8.51% more Republican than the nation-at-large. This was the last time Pennsylvania voted to the right of the national environment until 2016.

== Results ==
1948 United States presidential election in Pennsylvania
Party	Candidate	Votes	Percentage	Electoral votes
Republican	Thomas E. Dewey	1,902,197	50.93%	35
Democratic	Harry S. Truman (incumbent)	1,752,426	46.92%	0
Progressive	Henry A. Wallace	55,161	1.48%	0
Socialist	Norman Thomas	11,325	0.30%	0
Prohibition	Claude Watson	10,338	0.28%	0
Militant Workers	Farrell Dobbs	2,133	0.06%	0
Industrial Government	Edward Teichert	1,461	0.04%	0
Write-ins	Write-ins	107	0.00%	0
Totals		3,735,348	100.00%	35

=== Results by county ===
County	Thomas E. Dewey Republican		Harry S. Truman Democratic		Henry A. Wallace Progressive		Various candidates Other parties		Margin		Total votes cast
County	#	%	#	%	#	%	#	%	#	%	Total votes cast
Adams	7,988	59.13%	5,409	40.04%	49	0.36%	63	0.47%	2,579	19.09%	13,509
Allegheny	253,272	42.60%	326,303	54.89%	11,164	1.88%	3,767	0.63%	-73,031	-12.28%	594,506
Armstrong	11,712	53.45%	9,900	45.18%	120	0.55%	180	0.82%	1,812	8.27%	21,912
Beaver	22,324	43.83%	26,629	52.28%	1,588	3.12%	395	0.78%	-4,305	-8.45%	50,936
Bedford	6,028	61.02%	3,851	38.98%	0	0.00%	0	0.00%	2,177	22.04%	9,879
Berks	35,608	43.57%	43,075	52.71%	665	0.81%	2,378	2.91%	-7,467	-9.14%	81,726
Blair	22,382	60.68%	14,050	38.09%	256	0.69%	198	0.54%	8,332	22.59%	36,886
Bradford	11,783	71.99%	4,421	27.01%	51	0.31%	112	0.68%	7,362	44.98%	16,367
Bucks	29,411	62.46%	16,655	35.37%	619	1.31%	399	0.85%	12,756	27.09%	47,084
Butler	17,449	62.94%	9,818	35.41%	196	0.71%	261	0.94%	7,631	27.52%	27,724
Cambria	27,725	39.37%	41,533	58.98%	959	1.36%	205	0.29%	-13,808	-19.61%	70,422
Cameron	1,596	64.75%	858	34.81%	6	0.24%	5	0.20%	738	29.94%	2,465
Carbon	9,744	49.77%	9,438	48.21%	226	1.15%	170	0.87%	306	1.56%	19,578
Centre	10,416	61.52%	6,515	38.48%	0	0.00%	0	0.00%	3,901	23.04%	16,931
Chester	29,258	65.78%	14,670	32.98%	243	0.55%	307	0.69%	14,588	32.80%	44,478
Clarion	6,866	57.94%	4,984	42.06%	0	0.00%	0	0.00%	1,882	15.88%	11,850
Clearfield	11,810	49.95%	11,347	47.99%	259	1.10%	228	0.96%	463	1.96%	23,644
Clinton	5,618	52.85%	5,013	47.15%	0	0.00%	0	0.00%	605	5.69%	10,631
Columbia	9,417	50.13%	9,367	49.87%	0	0.00%	0	0.00%	50	0.27%	18,784
Crawford	14,161	60.69%	9,174	39.31%	0	0.00%	0	0.00%	4,987	21.37%	23,335
Cumberland	18,028	60.71%	11,421	38.46%	84	0.28%	162	0.55%	6,607	22.25%	29,695
Dauphin	46,861	62.16%	27,729	36.78%	394	0.52%	402	0.53%	19,132	25.38%	75,386
Delaware	93,412	60.93%	57,156	37.28%	1,562	1.02%	1,185	0.77%	36,256	23.65%	153,315
Elk	5,148	48.98%	5,363	51.02%	0	0.00%	0	0.00%	-215	-2.05%	10,511
Erie	33,806	53.45%	28,159	44.52%	660	1.04%	620	0.98%	5,647	8.93%	63,245
Fayette	20,401	36.19%	34,971	62.04%	468	0.83%	527	0.93%	-14,570	-25.85%	56,367
Forest	1,209	62.29%	687	35.39%	16	0.82%	29	1.49%	522	26.89%	1,941
Franklin	12,151	61.79%	7,352	37.39%	67	0.34%	94	0.48%	4,799	24.41%	19,664
Fulton	1,760	50.65%	1,684	48.46%	15	0.43%	16	0.46%	76	2.19%	3,475
Greene	4,717	36.47%	8,015	61.97%	144	1.11%	58	0.45%	-3,298	-25.50%	12,934
Huntingdon	6,943	67.76%	3,304	32.24%	0	0.00%	0	0.00%	3,639	35.51%	10,247
Indiana	12,640	59.67%	8,543	40.33%	0	0.00%	0	0.00%	4,097	19.34%	21,183
Jefferson	9,395	61.43%	5,632	36.82%	86	0.56%	182	1.19%	3,763	24.60%	15,295
Juniata	3,121	57.17%	2,299	42.11%	14	0.26%	25	0.46%	822	15.06%	5,459
Lackawanna	46,283	41.42%	64,495	57.71%	738	0.66%	233	0.21%	-18,212	-16.30%	111,749
Lancaster	46,306	67.60%	21,308	31.11%	369	0.54%	516	0.75%	24,998	36.49%	68,499
Lawrence	17,186	52.72%	14,632	44.88%	421	1.29%	360	1.10%	2,554	7.83%	32,599
Lebanon	15,553	61.62%	9,418	37.31%	132	0.52%	138	0.55%	6,135	24.31%	25,241
Lehigh	32,202	53.65%	26,826	44.69%	594	0.99%	400	0.67%	5,376	8.96%	60,022
Luzerne	71,674	52.85%	61,869	45.62%	977	0.72%	1,091	0.80%	9,805	7.23%	135,611
Lycoming	19,118	57.18%	13,692	40.95%	254	0.76%	372	1.11%	5,426	16.23%	33,436
McKean	10,218	66.91%	4,785	31.33%	108	0.71%	161	1.05%	5,433	35.57%	15,272
Mercer	18,916	52.71%	16,108	44.89%	540	1.50%	322	0.90%	2,808	7.82%	35,886
Mifflin	5,666	53.84%	4,762	45.25%	37	0.35%	58	0.55%	904	8.59%	10,523
Monroe	6,674	53.02%	5,913	46.98%	0	0.00%	0	0.00%	761	6.05%	12,587
Montgomery	85,576	66.53%	41,112	31.96%	1,089	0.85%	849	0.66%	44,464	34.57%	128,626
Montour	2,690	57.60%	1,964	42.06%	11	0.24%	5	0.11%	726	15.55%	4,670
Northampton	27,030	43.95%	33,209	53.99%	721	1.17%	544	0.88%	-6,179	-10.05%	61,504
Northumberland	23,535	58.13%	16,478	40.70%	306	0.76%	166	0.41%	7,057	17.43%	40,485
Perry	5,444	67.71%	2,596	32.29%	0	0.00%	0	0.00%	2,848	35.42%	8,040
Philadelphia	425,962	48.12%	432,699	48.88%	20,745	2.34%	5,891	0.67%	-6,737	-0.76%	885,297
Pike	2,893	70.54%	1,208	29.46%	0	0.00%	0	0.00%	1,685	41.09%	4,101
Potter	3,672	67.99%	1,729	32.01%	0	0.00%	0	0.00%	1,943	35.97%	5,401
Schuylkill	44,176	60.11%	28,194	38.36%	842	1.15%	280	0.38%	15,982	21.75%	73,492
Snyder	5,181	77.66%	1,490	22.34%	0	0.00%	0	0.00%	3,691	55.33%	6,671
Somerset	13,910	60.54%	8,727	37.98%	252	1.10%	89	0.39%	5,183	22.56%	22,978
Sullivan	1,752	61.22%	1,084	37.88%	13	0.45%	13	0.45%	668	23.34%	2,862
Susquehanna	7,945	67.81%	3,621	30.91%	85	0.73%	65	0.55%	4,324	36.91%	11,716
Tioga	10,016	77.03%	2,986	22.97%	0	0.00%	0	0.00%	7,030	54.07%	13,002
Union	5,058	76.79%	1,442	21.89%	29	0.44%	58	0.88%	3,616	54.90%	6,587
Venango	11,920	67.97%	5,144	29.33%	44	0.25%	428	2.44%	6,776	38.64%	17,536
Warren	8,378	65.38%	4,103	32.02%	52	0.41%	281	2.19%	4,275	33.36%	12,814
Washington	26,860	35.73%	46,327	61.63%	1,688	2.25%	291	0.39%	-19,467	-25.90%	75,166
Wayne	7,708	77.14%	2,284	22.86%	0	0.00%	0	0.00%	5,424	54.28%	9,992
Westmoreland	41,709	39.05%	61,901	57.95%	2,585	2.42%	619	0.58%	-20,192	-18.90%	106,814
Wyoming	4,332	70.70%	1,674	27.32%	63	1.03%	58	0.95%	2,658	43.38%	6,127
York	32,494	47.31%	33,321	48.52%	2,555	3.72%	308	0.45%	-827	-1.20%	68,678
Totals	1,902,197	50.92%	1,752,426	46.91%	55,161	1.48%	25,564	0.68%	149,771	4.01%	3,735,348

==== Counties that flipped from Democratic to Republican ====
- Carbon
- Columbia
- Luzerne

== See also ==
- United States presidential elections in Pennsylvania
