= 2024 United States presidential election in Pennsylvania =

- November 5, 2024
- Turnout: 76.6% (▲0.1 pp)

Nominee	Donald Trump	Kamala Harris
Party	Republican	Democratic
Home state	Florida	California
Running mate	JD Vance	Tim Walz
Electoral vote	19	0
Popular vote	3,543,308	3,423,042
Percentage	50.37%	48.66%

Harris
40–50%
50–60%
60–70%
70–80%
80–90%
90–100%
Trump
40–50%
50–60%
60–70%
70–80%
80–90%
90–100%
Tie/No data
President before election
Joe Biden
Democratic
Elected President
Donald Trump
Republican

The 2024 United States presidential election in Pennsylvania took place on Tuesday, November 5, 2024, as part of the 2024 United States presidential election in which all 50 states plus the District of Columbia participated. Pennsylvania voters chose electors to represent them in the Electoral College via a popular vote. The state of Pennsylvania has 19 electoral votes in the Electoral College, following reapportionment due to the 2020 United States census.

Pennsylvania held the largest electoral prize of all major swing states in 2024, with 19 electoral votes. As such, it was generally forecasted that the winner of the state was highly likely to win the entire election. According to statistician Nate Silver, the state's winner was estimated to have a 90% chance of winning the presidency. Major news organizations marked it as a tossup in the lead-up to the election. Pennsylvania was the tipping-point state in the election, providing Trump the 270th electoral vote. Pennsylvania voted 0.23% more Republican than the nation, while Michigan voted the closest to the nation, voting 0.06% more Democratic than the nation at-large.

Trump won Pennsylvania with 50.4% of the vote to Kamala Harris's 48.7%, defeating her by a margin of roughly 1.71% and flipping the state. This was the largest margin of victory for a Republican candidate since 1988, as well as the first time since that election that a Republican won over 50% of the vote.

Trump's victory is seen to have contributed to down-ballot victories for Republicans who won the races for the US Senate, two US House swing districts, Attorney General, Treasurer, and Auditor General. Except for the Senate race, all 2024 Pennsylvania Republican statewide candidates won over 50% of the vote, while Pennsylvania was the only state where the Republicans flipped more than one US House seat. (Note: Three US House seats flipped in North Carolina in 2024, but these flips were the result of a partisan gerrymander instituted in 2023, and none of the districts were seen as competitive.) Trump received more than 3.5 million votes, the most cast for any candidate in Pennsylvania history.

== Primary elections ==
=== Democratic primary ===
Pennsylvania Democratic primary, April 23, 2024
Candidate	Votes	%	Delegates
Joe Biden (incumbent)	953,916	87.93	159
Dean Phillips (withdrawn)	69,765	6.43	0
Write-in votes	61,136	5.64	—
Total	1,084,817	100%	159

=== Republican primary ===
Pennsylvania Republican primary, April 23, 2024
Candidate	Votes	Percentage	Actual delegate count		
Candidate	Votes	Percentage	Bound	Unbound	Total
Donald Trump	794,048	83.35%	16	46	67
Nikki Haley (withdrawn)	158,672	16.65%			
Unprojected delegates:				5	
Total:	952,720	100.00%	16	51	67

== General election ==
=== Voting law changes ===
In 2022, no-excuse mail-in voting was upheld by the Pennsylvania Supreme Court. Automatic voter registration was enacted in 2023, helping to register citizens when getting a driver's license.

=== Trump assassination attempt ===
On July 13, 2024, Trump was shot and wounded in an assassination attempt while holding a campaign rally west of Butler, Pennsylvania. The former president was struck in the right ear while on stage and was surrounded by Secret Service agents until the shooter was killed by members of the Counter Assault Team. One rally-goer, Corey D. Comperatore of Sarver, PA, died and two others were critically injured.

=== Predictions ===
Source	Ranking	As of
The Cook Political Report	Tossup	November 4, 2024
Sabato's Crystal Ball	Lean D	November 4, 2024
Decision Desk HQ/The Hill	Tossup	November 4, 2024
CNN	Tossup	November 4, 2024
CNalysis	Lean D	November 4, 2024
The Economist	Tossup	November 4, 2024
538	Tossup	November 4, 2024
Inside Elections	Tossup	November 4, 2024
NBC News	Tossup	November 4, 2024

=== Polling ===
Kamala Harris vs. Donald Trump

Aggregate polls

Source of poll aggregation	Dates administered	Dates updated	Kamala Harris Democratic	Donald Trump Republican	Other / Undecided (Note: Calculated by taking the difference of 100% and all other candidates combined.)	Margin
270ToWin	October 23 – November 4, 2024	November 4, 2024	48.2%	48.2%	3.6%	Tie
538	through November 4, 2024	November 4, 2024	47.9%	47.7%	4.4%	Harris +0.2%
Silver Bulletin	through November 4, 2024	November 4, 2024	48.0%	48.1%	3.9%	Trump +0.1%
Real Clear Politics	through November 4, 2024	November 4, 2024	48.5%	48.9%	2.6%	Trump +0.4%
The Hill/DDHQ	through November 4, 2024	November 4, 2024	48.0%	48.8%	3.2%	Trump +0.8%
Average			48.12%	48.34%	3.8%	Trump +0.22%

Poll source	Date(s) administered	Sample size (Note: Key: A – all adults RV – registered voters LV – likely voters V – unclear)	Margin of error	Kamala Harris Democratic	Donald Trump Republican	Other / Undecided
HarrisX	November 3–5, 2024	2,333 (RV)	± 2.3%	49%	45%	6%
HarrisX	November 3–5, 2024	2,333 (RV)	± 2.3%	52% (Note: With voters who lean towards a given candidate)	48%	–
HarrisX	November 3–5, 2024	2,103 (LV)	± 2.3%	51%	46%	3%
HarrisX	November 3–5, 2024	2,103 (LV)	± 2.3%	52%	48%	–
AtlasIntel	November 3–4, 2024	1,840 (LV)	± 2.0%	49%	50%	1%
Research Co.	November 2–3, 2024	450 (LV)	± 4.6%	48%	47%	5%
Trafalgar Group (R)	November 1–3, 2024	1,089 (LV)	± 2.9%	47%	48%	5% (Note: "Other" with 3%)
Patriot Polling	November 1–3, 2024	903 (RV)	± 3.0%	49%	50%	1%
InsiderAdvantage (R)	November 1–2, 2024	800 (LV)	± 3.5%	48%	49%	3% (Note: "Other" with 2%)
AtlasIntel	November 1–2, 2024	2,049 (LV)	± 2.0%	48%	50%	2%
Emerson College	October 30 – November 2, 2024	1,000 (LV)	± 3.0%	48%	49%	3% (Note: "Someone else" with 1%)
Emerson College	October 30 – November 2, 2024	1,000 (LV)	± 3.0%	49%	50%	1%
The New York Times/Siena College/The Philadelphia Inquirer	October 29 – November 2, 2024	1,527 (RV)	± 3.5%	47%	47%	5%
The New York Times/Siena College/The Philadelphia Inquirer	October 29 – November 2, 2024	1,527 (LV)	± 3.5%	48%	48%	4%
Mainstreet Research/Florida Atlantic University	October 25 – November 2, 2024	798 (RV)	± 3.1%	48%	46%	6% (Note: "Another Candidate" with 2%)
Mainstreet Research/Florida Atlantic University	October 25 – November 2, 2024	699 (LV)	± 3.1%	49%	47%	4% (Note: "Another Candidate" with 1%)
ActiVote	October 10 – November 2, 2024	400 (LV)	± 4.9%	50.5%	49.5%	–
SoCal Strategies (R) (Note: Poll sponsored by On Point Politics & Red Eagle Politics)	October 30–31, 2024	850 (LV)	± 3.6%	50%	48%	2%
AtlasIntel	October 30–31, 2024	1,738 (LV)	± 2.0%	48%	49%	3%
OnMessage Inc. (R)	October 29–31, 2024	800 (LV)	–	47%	49%	4%
YouGov (Note: Poll conducted for The Times, Stanford University, Arizona State University, and Yale University)	October 25–31, 2024	982 (RV)	± 3.5%	50%	48%	2%
YouGov	October 25–31, 2024	956 (LV)	± 3.5%	51%	48%	1%
Morning Consult	October 22−31, 2024	1,395 (LV)	± 3.0%	48%	48%	4%
Muhlenberg College/Morning Call	October 27–30, 2024	460 (RV)	± 6.0%	49%	47%	4% (Note: "Neither/Other" with 2%)
Marist College	October 27–30, 2024	1,558 (RV)	± 3.2%	51%	47%	2% (Note: "Another Party's Candidate" with 1%)
Marist College	October 27–30, 2024	1,400 (LV)	± 3.4%	50%	48%	2%
Echelon Insights	October 27–30, 2024	600 (LV)	± 4.5%	46%	52%	2%
The Washington Post	October 26–30, 2024	1,204 (LV)	± 3.1%	48%	47%	5%
AtlasIntel	October 25–29, 2024	1,299 (LV)	± 3.0%	47%	50%	3%
Rasmussen Reports (R) (Note: Poll sponsored by American Thinker)	October 25–28, 2024	849 (LV)	± 3.0%	47%	49%	4%
Fox News	October 24–28, 2024	1,310 (RV)	± 2.5%	50%	48%	2%
Fox News	October 24–28, 2024	1,057 (LV)	± 3.0%	49%	50%	1%
Quinnipiac University	October 24–28, 2024	2,186 (LV)	± 2.1%	47%	49%	4%
CBS News/YouGov	October 22–28, 2024	1,273 (LV)	± 3.5%	49%	49%	1% (Note: "Someone else/third party" with 1%)
InsiderAdvantage (R)	October 26–27, 2024	800 (LV)	± 3.5%	47%	48%	5%
Redfield & Wilton Strategies	October 25–27, 2024	1,116 (LV)	± 2.8%	48%	48%	4%
North Star Opinion Research (R) (Note: Poll sponsored by American Greatness)	October 22–26, 2024	600 (LV)	± 4.0%	47%	47%	6%
CES/YouGov	October 1–25, 2024	3,708 (A)	–	50%	47%	3%
CES/YouGov	October 1–25, 2024	3,685 (LV)	–	49%	48%	3%
Emerson College (Note: Poll sponsored by RealClearPennsylvania)	October 21–22, 2024	860 (LV)	± 3.4%	48%	49%	3%
Emerson College	October 21–22, 2024	860 (LV)	± 3.4%	49%	51%	–
Redfield & Wilton Strategies	October 20–22, 2024	1,586 (LV)	± 2.3%	48%	47%	5%
Susquehanna Polling and Research (R) (Note: Poll sponsored by La Torre Live)	October 18−22, 2024	500 (LV)	± 4.4%	46%	46%	8%
Quantus Insights (R) (Note: Poll sponsored by TrendingPolitics)	October 17−20, 2024	840 (LV)	± 3.0%	48%	50%	2%
Bloomberg/Morning Consult	October 16–20, 2024	866 (RV)	± 3.0%	48%	48%	4%
Bloomberg/Morning Consult	October 16–20, 2024	812 (LV)	± 3.0%	50%	48%	2%
Franklin & Marshall College	October 9−20, 2024	890 (RV)	± 4.3%	48%	44%	8%
Franklin & Marshall College	October 9−20, 2024	583 (LV)	± 5.0%	49%	50%	1%
Trafalgar Group (R)	October 17−19, 2024	1,084 (LV)	± 2.9%	43%	46%	11% (Note: "Other" with 5%)
The Bullfinch Group	October 11−18, 2024	600 (LV)	± 4.0%	49%	49%	2%
The Bullfinch Group	October 11−18, 2024	600 (LV)	± 4.0%	49%	48%	3% (Note: "A third party / Independent candidate" with 2%)
AtlasIntel	October 12–17, 2024	2,048 (LV)	± 2.0%	47%	50%	3%
Rose Institute/YouGov	October 7–17, 2024	1,062 (RV)	± 3.4%	48%	46%	6% (Note: "Other" with 6%)
Rose Institute/YouGov	October 7–17, 2024	1,043 (LV)	± 3.4%	50%	48%	2%
Morning Consult	October 6−15, 2024	1,395 (LV)	± 3.0%	49%	48%	3%
The Washington Post/Schar School	September 30 – October 15, 2024	707 (RV)	± 4.6%	49%	46%	5%
The Washington Post/Schar School	September 30 – October 15, 2024	707 (LV)	± 4.6%	49%	47%	4%
Rasmussen Reports (R)	October 9–13, 2024	1,072 (LV)	± 3.0%	47%	50%	3% (Note: "Other" with 1%)
The New York Times/Siena College/The Philadelphia Inquirer	October 7–10, 2024	857 (RV)	± 4.0%	50%	47%	4%
The New York Times/Siena College/The Philadelphia Inquirer	October 7–10, 2024	857 (LV)	± 4.0%	50%	47%	3%
American Pulse Research & Polling	October 2–10, 2024	1,193 (LV)	± 2.8%	49.5%	50.5%	–
TIPP Insights	October 7–9, 2024	1,079 (RV)	± 3.5%	49%	45%	6%
TIPP Insights	October 7–9, 2024	803 (LV)	± 3.5%	48%	49%	3%
Fabrizio, Lee & Associates (R)/McLaughlin & Associates (R) (Note: Poll sponsored by Trump's campaign)	October 6–9, 2024	800 (LV)	± 3.5%	48%	49%	3%
InsiderAdvantage (R)	October 7–8, 2024	800 (LV)	± 3.5%	47%	49%	4%
Emerson College	October 5–8, 2024	1,000 (LV)	± 3.0%	48%	49%	3%
Emerson College	October 5–8, 2024	1,000 (LV)	± 3.0%	49%	50%	1%
The Wall Street Journal	September 28 – October 8, 2024	600 (RV)	± 5.0%	46%	47%	7%
Research Co.	October 5–7, 2024	450 (LV)	± 4.6%	48%	47%	5% (Note: "Some other candidate" with 1%)
Research Co.	October 5–7, 2024	450 (LV)	± 4.6%	50%	49%	1%
Quinnipiac University	October 3–7, 2024	1,412 (LV)	± 2.6%	49%	47%	4%
Hunt Research (Note: Poll conducted for the University of Austin)	October 2–7, 2024	1,037 (LV)	± 3.0%	47%	48%	5%
Center for Working Class Politics/YouGov (Note: Poll sponsored by Jacobin)	September 24 – October 2, 2024	1,000 (RV)	± 4.2%	47%	45%	8% (Note: "Another Candidate" with 3%)
OnMessage Inc. (R) (Note: Poll conducted for the Article III Project)	September 24 – October 2, 2024	500 (LV)	± 4.4%	46%	46%	8%
OnMessage Inc. (R) (Note: Poll conducted for the Sentinel Action Fund PAC)	September 28–29, 2024	800 (LV)	± 3.5%	47%	47%	6%
Patriot Polling	September 27–29, 2024	816 (RV)	–	49%	50%	1%
The Bullfinch Group (Note: Poll sponsored by Commonwealth Foundation)	September 26–29, 2024	800 (RV)	± 3.5%	50%	46%	4%
Trafalgar Group (R)	September 26–29, 2024	1,090 (LV)	± 2.9%	45%	48%	7%
Global Strategy Group (D)/North Star Opinion Research (R) (Note: Poll sponsored by the Peter G. Peterson Foundation)	September 23–29, 2024	408 (LV)	± 4.9%	48%	48%	4%
Emerson College	September 27–28, 2024	1,000 (LV)	± 3.0%	48%	48%	4% (Note: "Someone else" with 2%)
Emerson College	September 27–28, 2024	1,000 (LV)	± 3.0%	49%	49%	2%
AtlasIntel	September 20–25, 2024	1,775 (LV)	± 2.0%	48%	51%	1%
Cook Political Report/BSG (R)/GS Strategy Group (D)	September 19–25, 2024	474 (LV)	–	50%	49%	1%
Bloomberg/Morning Consult	September 19–25, 2024	993 (RV)	± 3.0%	49%	46%	5%
Bloomberg/Morning Consult	September 19–25, 2024	924 (LV)	± 3.0%	51%	46%	3%
ActiVote	September 1–25, 2024	400 (LV)	± 4.9%	52%	48%	–
Fox News	September 20−24, 2024	1,021 (RV)	± 3.0%	50%	48%	2%
Fox News	September 20−24, 2024	775 (LV)	± 3.5%	49%	49%	2%
Fabrizio Ward (R)/Impact Research (D) (Note: Poll commissioned by AARP)	September 17–24, 2024	600 (LV)	± 4.0%	50%	47%	3%
Rodriguez Gudelunas Strategies (Note: Poll sponsored by Focus on Rural America)	September 19–23, 2024	400 (LV)	–	48%	48%	4%
Rasmussen Reports (R)	September 19–22, 2024	1,202 (LV)	± 3.0%	48%	48%	4%
Rasmussen Reports (R)	September 19–22, 2024	1,202 (LV)	± 3.0%	50%	49%	1%
Susquehanna Polling and Research (R)	September 16–22, 2024	700 (LV)	± 3.7%	46%	46%	8%
RMG Research (Note: Poll sponsored by the Napolitan Institute)	September 18–20, 2024	783 (LV)	± 3.5%	48%	47%	5% (Note: "Some other candidate" with 3%)
RMG Research	September 18–20, 2024	783 (LV)	± 3.5%	49%	49%	3% (Note: "Would not vote" with 1%)
Muhlenberg College/Morning Call	September 16–19, 2024	450 (RV)	± 6.0%	48%	48%	4% (Note: "Neither/Other" with 4%)
Emerson College	September 15–18, 2024	880 (LV)	± 3.2%	47%	48%	5%
Emerson College	September 15–18, 2024	880 (LV)	± 3.2%	50%	49%	1%
MassINC Polling Group (Note: Poll sponsored by Spotlight PA)	September 12−18, 2024	800 (LV)	± 4.0%	52%	47%	1%
Morning Consult	September 9−18, 2024	1,756 (LV)	± 2.0%	49%	47%	4%
Marist College	September 12−17, 2024	1,663 (RV)	± 3.0%	49%	48%	3% (Note: "Another Party's Candidate" with 2%)
Marist College	September 12−17, 2024	1,476 (LV)	± 3.2%	49%	49%	2%
The Washington Post	September 12−16, 2024	1,003 (RV)	± 3.6%	48%	47%	5%
The Washington Post	September 12−16, 2024	1,003 (LV)	± 3.6%	48%	48%	4%
Quinnipiac University	September 12−16, 2024	1,331 (LV)	± 2.7%	51%	46%	2%
The New York Times/Siena College/The Philadelphia Inquirer	September 11−16, 2024	1,082 (RV)	± 3.8%	50%	46%	4%
The New York Times/Siena College/The Philadelphia Inquirer	September 11−16, 2024	1,082 (LV)	± 3.8%	50%	46%	4%
Suffolk University/USA Today	September 11−16, 2024	500 (LV)	± 4.4%	49%	46%	5%
InsiderAdvantage (R)	September 14−15, 2024	800 (LV)	± 3.5%	48%	50%	2%
	September 10, 2024	The presidential debate between Harris and Trump hosted by ABC				
Morning Consult	August 30 – September 8, 2024	1,910 (LV)	± 2.0%	49%	46%	5%
co/efficient (R)	September 4–6, 2024	889 (LV)	± 3.3%	46%	48%	6%
CBS News/YouGov	September 3–6, 2024	1,078 (LV)	± 3.5%	50%	50%	–
Patriot Polling	September 1–3, 2024	857 (RV)	–	48%	49%	3%
Trafalgar Group (R)	August 28–30, 2024	1,082 (LV)	± 2.9%	45%	47%	8%
Wick Insights (Note: Poll sponsored by 2WAY)	August 27–29, 2024	1,607 (LV)	–	49%	49%	2%
Emerson College	August 25–28, 2024	950 (LV)	± 3.1%	48%	48%	4%
Emerson College	August 25–28, 2024	950 (LV)	± 3.1%	49%	49%	1%
Bloomberg/Morning Consult	August 23–26, 2024	803 (LV)	± 4.0%	51%	47%	2%
Bloomberg/Morning Consult	August 23–26, 2024	758 (RV)	± 3.0%	51%	48%	1%
SoCal Strategies (R)	August 23, 2024	713 (LV)	–	47%	48%	5%
SoCal Strategies (R)	August 23, 2024	800 (RV)	–	47%	47%	6%
	August 23, 2024	Robert F. Kennedy Jr. suspends his presidential campaign and endorses Donald Trump.				
YouGov (Note: Poll conducted for the Cato Institute)	August 15–23, 2024	500 (A)	± 5.1%	43%	43%	14% (Note: "Will not vote" with 6%)
YouGov	August 15–23, 2024	– (LV)	± 6.0%	47%	47%	6% (Note: "Will not vote" with 1%)
	August 22, 2024	Democratic National Convention concludes				
Institute for Global Affairs/YouGov	August 15–22, 2024	350 (A)	± 6.0%	40%	44%	16% (Note: "I am eligible to vote but would not" with 8%; "Other" with 7%; "I am not eligible to vote" with 1%)
ActiVote	August 5–22, 2024	400 (LV)	± 4.9%	51%	49%	–
Fabrizio Ward (R) (Note: Poll conducted for the Pinpoint Policy Institute)	August 19–21, 2024	400 (LV)	± 4.9%	46%	47%	7%
Spry Strategies (R) (Note: Poll sponsored by the American Principles Project)	August 14–20, 2024	600 (LV)	± 4.0%	48%	47%	5%
InsiderAdvantage (R)	August 18–19, 2024	800 (LV)	± 3.5%	46%	47%	7%
Rasmussen Reports (R) (Note: Poll sponsored by NumbersUSA)	August 13–17, 2024	1,312 (LV)	± 3.0%	46%	47%	7%
Focaldata	August 6–16, 2024	719 (LV)	± 3.7%	50%	50%	–
Cygnal (R)	August 14–15, 2024	800 (LV)	± 3.4%	48%	47%	5%
Emerson College	August 13–14, 2024	1,000 (RV)	± 3.0%	48%	49%	3%
Emerson College	August 13–14, 2024	1,000 (RV)	± 3.0%	49%	51%	–
Quinnipiac University	August 8–12, 2024	1,738 (LV)	± 2.4%	50%	47%	3%
The Bullfinch Group (Note: Poll conducted for The Independent Center)	August 8–11, 2024	500 (RV)	± 4.4%	49%	45%	6%
The New York Times/Siena College	August 6–9, 2024	693 (RV)	± 4.2%	49%	46%	5%
The New York Times/Siena College	August 6–9, 2024	693 (LV)	± 4.2%	50%	46%	4%
Trafalgar Group (R)	August 6–8, 2024	1,078 (LV)	± 2.9%	44%	46%	10%
Navigator Research (D)	July 31 – August 8, 2024	600 (LV)	± 4.0%	46%	48%	6%
Cook Political Report/BSG (R)/GS Strategy Group (D)	July 26 – August 8, 2024	411 (LV)	–	49%	48%	3%
Fabrizio, Lee & Associates (R) (Note: Poll commissioned by Early Vote Action PAC)	July 29 – August 1, 2024	600 (LV)	–	48%	48%	4%
Public Policy Polling (D) (Note: Poll conducted for Progress Action Fund, which supports Democratic candidates)	July 29–30, 2024	627 (RV)	± 3.9%	47%	48%	5%
GQR Research (D)	July 26–30, 2024	500 (LV)	± 4.4%	50%	46%	4% (Note: Chase Oliver (L) with 2%)
Public Opinion Strategies (R) (Note: Poll conducted for Competitiveness Coalition)	July 23–29, 2024	400 (LV)	± 4.9%	48%	45%	7%
Quantus Insights (R)	July 27–28, 2024	500 (RV)	± 4.4%	46%	48%	6%
Bloomberg/Morning Consult	July 24–28, 2024	804 (RV)	± 4.0%	46%	50%	4%
The Bullfinch Group	July 23–25, 2024	800 (RV)	± 3.5%	48%	47%	5%
Fox News	July 22–24, 2024	1,034 (RV)	± 3.0%	49%	49%	2%
Emerson College	July 22–23, 2024	850 (RV)	± 3.3%	46%	48%	6%
Emerson College	July 22–23, 2024	850 (RV)	± 3.3%	49%	51%	–
	July 21, 2024	Joe Biden announces his withdrawal from the race; Kamala Harris declares her candidacy for president.				
North Star Opinion Research (R)	July 20–23, 2024	600 (LV)	± 4.0%	45%	47%	9%
SoCal Strategies (R) (Note: Poll sponsored by On Point Politics)	July 20–21, 2024	500 (LV)	± 4.4%	46%	50%	4%
	July 19, 2024	Republican National Convention concludes				
InsiderAdvantage (R)	July 15–16, 2024	800 (LV)	± 3.5%	40%	47%	13%
	July 15, 2024	Republican National Convention begins				
	July 13, 2024	Attempted assassination of Donald Trump				
Public Policy Polling (D)	July 11–12, 2024	537 (RV)	–	45%	51%	4%
The New York Times/Siena College	July 9–11, 2024	872 (RV)	± 3.7%	46%	48%	6%
The New York Times/Siena College	July 9–11, 2024	872 (LV)	± 3.7%	47%	48%	5%
Bloomberg/Morning Consult	May 7–13, 2024	812 (RV)	± 3.0%	43%	50%	7%
Emerson College	February 14–16, 2024	1,000 (RV)	± 3.0%	40%	49%	11%
The New York Times/Siena College	October 22 – November 3, 2023	600 (RV)	± 4.6%	44%	47%	9%
The New York Times/Siena College	October 22 – November 3, 2023	600 (LV)	± 4.6%	44%	48%	8%

Kamala Harris vs. Donald Trump vs. Cornel West vs. Jill Stein vs. Chase Oliver

Aggregate polls

Source of poll aggregation	Dates administered	Dates updated	Kamala Harris Democratic	Donald Trump Republican	Jill Stein Green	Cornel West Independent	Chase Oliver Libertarian	Others/ Undecided (Note: Calculated by taking the difference of 100% and all other candidates combined.)	Margin
Race to the WH	through October 28, 2024	November 2, 2024	48.0%	47.5%	1.0%	—N/a	0.6%	2.9%	Harris +0.5%
270toWin	October 17 – 28, 2024	November 2, 2024	47.9%	47.9%	0.8%	—N/a	0.7%	2.7%	Tie
Average			47.95%	47.7%	0.9%	—N/a	0.65%	2.8%	Harris +0.25%

Poll source	Date(s) administered	Sample size	Margin of error	Kamala Harris Democratic	Donald Trump Republican	Cornel West Independent	Jill Stein Green	Chase Oliver Libertarian	Other / Undecided
HarrisX	November 3–5, 2024	2,333 (RV)	± 2.3%	48%	45%	1%	1%	–	5%
HarrisX	November 3–5, 2024	2,333 (RV)	± 2.3%	50%	47%	2%	1%	–	–
HarrisX	November 3–5, 2024	2,103 (LV)	± 2.3%	50%	46%	1%	0%	–	3%
HarrisX	November 3–5, 2024	2,103 (LV)	± 2.3%	51.0%	47.5%	1.0%	0.5%	–	–
AtlasIntel	November 3–4, 2024	1,840 (LV)	± 2.0%	48%	49%	–	1%	0%	2%
Survation	November 1–4, 2024	941 (LV)	± 3.9%	49%	47%	–	1%	1%	2%
Survation	November 1–4, 2024	915 (LV)	± 3.9%	50.6%	47.8%	–	0.9%	0.7%	–
AtlasIntel	November 1–2, 2024	2,049 (LV)	± 2.0%	47%	49%	–	1%	1%	2%
The New York Times/Siena College/The Philadelphia Inquirer	October 29 – November 2, 2024	1,527 (RV)	± 3.5%	46%	47%	–	1%	1%	5%
The New York Times/Siena College/The Philadelphia Inquirer	October 29 – November 2, 2024	1,527 (LV)	± 3.5%	47%	47%	–	1%	0%	5%
Focaldata	October 3 – November 1, 2024	2,373 (LV)	–	50%	48%	–	1%	1%	–
Focaldata	October 3 – November 1, 2024	2,119 (RV)	± 2.0%	51%	47%	–	1%	1%	–
Focaldata	October 3 – November 1, 2024	2,373 (A)	–	49%	47%	–	1%	2%	1%
AtlasIntel	October 30–31, 2024	1,738 (LV)	± 2.0%	47%	49%	–	1%	1%	2%
Data for Progress (D)	October 25–31, 2024	908 (LV)	± 3.0%	50%	48%	–	1%	0%	2%
YouGov	October 25–31, 2024	982 (RV)	± 3.5%	48%	46%	0%	1%	–	5%
YouGov	October 25–31, 2024	956 (LV)	± 3.5%	49%	46%	0%	0%	–	5%
Redfield & Wilton Strategies	October 28–31, 2024	1,596 (LV)	–	48%	48%	–	0%	1%	3%
Suffolk University/USA Today	October 27–30, 2024	500 (LV)	± 4.4%	49%	49%	–	0%	1%	1%
Echelon Insights	October 27–30, 2024	600 (LV)	± 4.5%	46%	51%	–	1%	0%	2%
The Washington Post	October 26–30, 2024	1,204 (RV)	± 3.1%	48%	47%	–	1%	1%	3%
The Washington Post	October 26–30, 2024	1,204 (LV)	± 3.1%	48%	47%	–	1%	1%	3%
AtlasIntel	October 25–29, 2024	1,299 (LV)	± 3.0%	47%	49%	–	1%	1%	2%
Quinnipiac University	October 24–28, 2024	2,186 (LV)	± 2.1%	46%	47%	–	2%	1%	4%
CNN/SSRS	October 23–28, 2024	819 (LV)	± 4.7%	48%	48%	–	1%	1%	2%
Redfield & Wilton Strategies	October 25–27, 2024	1,116 (LV)	–	48%	48%	–	0%	1%	3%
North Star Opinion Research (R)	October 22–26, 2024	600 (LV)	± 4.0%	47%	47%	–	1%	1%	4%
University of Massachusetts Lowell/YouGov	October 16–23, 2024	800 (LV)	± 4.0%	48%	47%	–	1%	1%	3%
Redfield & Wilton Strategies	October 20–22, 2024	1,586 (LV)	–	48%	47%	–	0%	1%	4%
Bloomberg/Morning Consult	October 16–20, 2024	866 (RV)	± 3.0%	48%	48%	–	0%	2%	2%
Bloomberg/Morning Consult	October 16–20, 2024	812 (LV)	± 3.0%	50%	48%	–	0%	1%	1%
Franklin & Marshall College	October 9–20, 2024	890 (RV)	± 4.3%	49%	45%	–	2%	1%	3%
Redfield & Wilton Strategies	October 16–18, 2024	1,256 (LV)	–	48%	48%	–	0%	1%	3%
AtlasIntel	October 12–17, 2024	2,048 (LV)	± 2.0%	47%	50%	–	2%	0%	1%
Redfield & Wilton Strategies	October 12–14, 2024	1,649 (LV)	–	48%	48%	–	0%	1%	3%
The New York Times/Siena College/The Philadelphia Inquirer	October 7–10, 2024	857 (RV)	± 4.0%	49%	45%	–	2%	1%	3%
The New York Times/Siena College/The Philadelphia Inquirer	October 7–10, 2024	857 (LV)	± 4.0%	49%	45%	–	1%	0%	5%
American Pulse Research & Polling	October 2–10, 2024	1,193 (LV)	–	48%	49%	–	2%	0%	1%
Redfield & Wilton Strategies	October 8–9, 2024	707 (LV)	–	46%	48%	–	0%	1%	5%
TIPP Insights	October 7–9, 2024	1,079 (RV)	± 3.5%	49%	45%	1%	1%	–	4%
TIPP Insights	October 7–9, 2024	803 (LV)	± 3.5%	48%	49%	1%	0%	–	2%
University of Massachusetts Lowell/YouGov	October 2–9, 2024	800 (LV)	± 4.0%	46%	45%	–	1%	0%	8%
J.L. Partners (Note: Poll sponsored by The Daily Mail)	October 5–8, 2024	800 (LV)	± 3.5%	47%	47%	–	1%	1%	4%
Quinnipiac University	October 3–7, 2024	1,412 (LV)	± 2.6%	49%	46%	–	1%	1%	3%
Hunt Research	October 2–7, 2024	1,037 (LV)	± 3.0%	47%	47%	–	1%	1%	4%
Redfield & Wilton Strategies	September 27 – October 2, 2024	5,686 (LV)	–	48%	47%	–	0%	1%	4%
The Bullfinch Group	September 26–29, 2024	800 (RV)	± 3.5%	50%	46%	–	1%	0%	3%
AtlasIntel	September 20–25, 2024	1,775 (LV)	± 2.0%	48%	51%	–	0%	0%	1%
Bloomberg/Morning Consult	September 19–25, 2024	993 (RV)	± 3.0%	50%	44%	–	0%	4%	2%
Bloomberg/Morning Consult	September 19–25, 2024	924 (LV)	± 3.0%	51%	45%	–	0%	3%	1%
Fox News	September 20−24, 2024	1,021 (RV)	± 3.0%	48%	46%	–	1%	2%	3%
Fox News	September 20−24, 2024	775 (LV)	± 3.5%	47%	48%	–	2%	2%	1%
Fabrizio Ward (R)/Impact Research (D)	September 17–24, 2024	600 (LV)	± 4.0%	49%	47%	–	1%	0%	3%
Redfield & Wilton Strategies	September 16–19, 2024	1,086 (LV)	–	47%	47%	–	0%	1%	5%
University of Massachusetts Lowell/YouGov	September 11–19, 2024	800 (LV)	± 4.0%	48%	46%	–	1%	1%	4%
MassINC Polling Group	September 12−18, 2024	800 (LV)	± 4.0%	50%	46%	−	1%	0%	3%
Quinnipiac University	September 12−16, 2024	1,331 (LV)	± 2.7%	51%	45%	−	1%	0%	3%
Franklin & Marshall College	September 4–15, 2024	890 (RV)	± 4.1%	49%	46%	–	1%	1%	3%
Redfield & Wilton Strategies	September 6–9, 2024	801 (LV)	–	45%	45%	–	0%	1%	9%
YouGov	August 23 – September 3, 2024	1,000 (RV)	± 3.6%	46%	45%	0%	1%	–	8%
Wick Insights	August 27–29, 2024	1,607 (LV)	–	47%	48%	–	1%	1%	3%
CNN/SSRS	August 23–29, 2024	789 (LV)	± 4.7%	47%	47%	–	1%	1%	4%
Redfield & Wilton Strategies	August 25–28, 2024	1,071 (LV)	–	46%	45%	–	1%	0%	8%
Bloomberg/Morning Consult	August 23–26, 2024	803 (LV)	± 4.0%	51%	46%	–	1%	1%	1%
Bloomberg/Morning Consult	August 23–26, 2024	758 (RV)	± 3.0%	51%	45%	–	2%	1%	1%

Kamala Harris vs. Donald Trump vs. Jill Stein

Poll source	Date(s) administered	Sample size	Margin of error	Kamala Harris Democratic	Donald Trump Republican	Jill Stein Green	Other / Undecided
Cook Political Report/BSG (R)/GS Strategy Group (D)	September 19–25, 2024	474 (LV)	–	49%	47%	1%	3%
Remington Research Group (R) (Note: Poll sponsored by American Fuel & Petrochemical Manufacturers, a group that supports Republican candidates)	September 16–20, 2024	800 (LV)	± 3.5%	47%	48%	1%	4%
The Washington Post	September 12−16, 2024	1,003 (RV)	± 3.6%	48%	47%	1%	4%
The Washington Post	September 12−16, 2024	1,003 (LV)	± 3.6%	48%	47%	1%	4%

Hypothetical polling with Robert F. Kennedy Jr.

Kamala Harris vs. Donald Trump vs. Robert F. Kennedy Jr. vs. Cornel West vs. Jill Stein vs. Chase Oliver

Poll source	Date(s) administered	Sample size	Margin of error	Kamala Harris Democratic	Donald Trump Republican	Robert Kennedy Jr Independent	Cornel West Independent	Jill Stein Green	Chase Oliver Libertarian	Other / Undecided
Fox News	October 24–28, 2024	1,310 (RV)	± 2.5%	48%	46%	3%	0%	1%	1%	1%
Fox News	October 24–28, 2024	1,057 (LV)	± 3.0%	48%	48%	2%	0%	1%	0%	1%
The Wall Street Journal	September 28 – October 8, 2024	600 (RV)	± 5.0%	45%	46%	0%	0%	2%	1%	6%
Global Strategy Group (D)/North Star Opinion Research (R)	September 23–29, 2024	408 (LV)	± 4.9%	47%	47%	0%	0%	0%	1%	5%
The New York Times/Siena College/The Philadelphia Inquirer	September 11−16, 2024	1,082 (RV)	± 3.8%	48%	45%	0%	0%	1%	1%	5%
The New York Times/Siena College/The Philadelphia Inquirer	September 11−16, 2024	1,082 (LV)	± 3.8%	49%	45%	0%	0%	1%	1%	4%
YouGov	August 15–23, 2024	500 (A)	± 5.1%	43%	41%	3%	0%	1%	1%	11% (Note: "Will not vote" with 6%)
YouGov	August 15–23, 2024	– (LV)	± 5.9%	48%	46%	2%	0%	1%	1%	2%
Spry Strategies (R)	August 14–20, 2024	600 (LV)	± 4.0%	46%	45%	4%	–	1%	–	4%
Rasmussen Reports (R)	August 13–17, 2024	1,312 (LV)	± 3.0%	46%	45%	5%	0%	1%	–	3%
Focaldata	August 6–16, 2024	719 (LV)	± 3.7%	48%	47%	4%	–	0%	0%	1%
Focaldata	August 6–16, 2024	719 (RV)	± 3.7%	49%	46%	4%	–	0%	0%	1%
Focaldata	August 6–16, 2024	719 (A)	± 3.7%	47%	47%	4%	–	0%	0%	2%
Cygnal (R)	August 14–15, 2024	800 (LV)	± 3.4%	43%	44%	5%	2%	2%	0%	4%
Redfield & Wilton Strategies	August 12–15, 2024	825 (LV)	–	46%	44%	4%	–	0%	0%	6%
Emerson College	August 13–14, 2024	1,000 (RV)	± 3.0%	47%	47%	3%	0%	0%	0%	3%
Quinnipiac University	August 8–12, 2024	1,738 (LV)	± 2.4%	48%	45%	4%	–	0%	0%	3%
The Bullfinch Group	August 8–11, 2024	500 (RV)	± 4.4%	45%	41%	6%	2%	0%	–	6%
Franklin & Marshall College	July 31 – August 11, 2024	920 (RV)	± 3.8%	46%	43%	6%	–	1%	1%	3%
The New York Times/Siena College	August 6–9, 2024	693 (RV)	± 4.2%	45%	43%	5%	0%	2%	1%	5%
The New York Times/Siena College	August 6–9, 2024	693 (LV)	± 4.2%	46%	44%	4%	0%	1%	1%	3%
Navigator Research (D)	July 31 – August 8, 2024	600 (LV)	± 4.0%	44%	46%	5%	1%	1%	1%	2%
Cook Political Report/BSG (R)/GS Strategy Group (D)	July 26 – August 8, 2024	411 (LV)	–	48%	43%	5%	0%	0%	–	4%
Redfield & Wilton Strategies	July 31 – August 3, 2024	743 (LV)	–	44%	46%	3%	–	0%	0%	7%
Bloomberg/Morning Consult	July 24–28, 2024	804 (RV)	± 4.0%	44%	46%	3%	–	1%	4%	2%
The Bullfinch Group	July 23–25, 2024	800 (RV)	± 3.5%	44%	44%	6%	–	1%	1%	4%
Redfield & Wilton Strategies	July 22–24, 2024	851 (LV)	–	42%	46%	5%	–	0%	0%	7%
Fox News	July 22–24, 2024	1,034 (RV)	± 3.0%	45%	43%	7%	1%	1%	–	3%
Emerson College	July 22–23, 2024	850 (RV)	± 3.3%	44%	46%	3%	1%	1%	0%	5%
	July 21, 2024	Joe Biden announces his withdrawal from the race; Kamala Harris declares her candidacy for president.								
Public Policy Polling (D) (Note: Poll conducted for Clean and Prosperous America PAC)	July 17–18, 2024	624 (RV)	± 3.8%	43%	45%	4%	–	2%	–	6%
The New York Times/Siena College	July 9–11, 2024	872 (RV)	± 3.7%	40%	42%	7%	0%	3%	–	8%
The New York Times/Siena College	July 9–11, 2024	872 (LV)	± 3.7%	42%	43%	6%	0%	2%	–	7%

Kamala Harris vs. Donald Trump vs. Robert F. Kennedy Jr.

Poll source	Date(s) administered	Sample size	Margin of error	Kamala Harris Democratic	Donald Trump Republican	Robert Kennedy Jr Independent	Other / Undecided
Z to A Research (D) (Note: Poll conducted for Rust Belt Rising, which supports Democratic candidates)	August 23–26, 2024	613 (LV)	–	46%	46%	5%	3%
Fabrizio Ward (R)	August 19–21, 2024	400 (LV)	± 4.9%	43%	43%	3%	11%
Fabrizio, Lee & Associates (R)	July 29 – August 1, 2024	600 (LV)	–	45%	45%	4%	6%
Susquehanna Polling and Research (R)	July 22–28, 2024	600 (LV)	± 4.0%	47%	43%	3%	7%
	July 21, 2024	Joe Biden announces his withdrawal from the race; Kamala Harris declares her candidacy for president.					
Civiqs	July 13–16, 2024	536 (RV)	± 4.7%	44%	46%	5%	5%

Hypothetical polling with Joe Biden and Donald Trump

Joe Biden vs. Donald Trump

Poll source	Date(s) administered	Sample size	Margin of error	Joe Biden Democratic	Donald Trump Republican	Other / Undecided
SoCal Strategies (R)	August 23, 2024	713 (LV)	–	43%	47%	10%
SoCal Strategies (R)	August 23, 2024	800 (RV)	–	41%	46%	13%
SoCal Strategies (R)	July 20–21, 2024	500 (LV)	± 4.4%	46%	50%	4%
Public Policy Polling (D)	July 17–18, 2024	624 (RV)	± 3.8%	44%	49%	7%
InsiderAdvantage (R)	July 15–16, 2024	800 (LV)	± 3.5%	45%	49%	6%
Emerson College (Note: Poll sponsored by Democrats for the Next Generation PAC)	July 15–16, 2024	1,000 (RV)	± 3.0%	43%	48%	9%
Public Policy Polling (D)	July 11–12, 2024	537 (RV)	–	44%	47%	9%
Rasmussen Reports (R) (Note: Poll sponsored by The Heartland Institute)	July 5–12, 2024	1,041 (LV)	± 3.0%	44%	47%	9%
The New York Times/Siena College	July 9–11, 2024	872 (RV)	± 3.7%	44%	48%	8%
The New York Times/Siena College	July 9–11, 2024	872 (LV)	± 3.7%	45%	48%	7%
Echelon Insights (Note: Poll sponsored by NetChoice)	July 1–8, 2024	612 (LV)	± 4.9%	48%	47%	7%
Bloomberg/Morning Consult	July 1–5, 2024	794 (RV)	± 3.0%	44%	51%	5%
Emerson College	June 30 – July 2, 2024	1,000 (RV)	± 3.0%	43%	48%	9%
Cygnal (R)	June 27–28, 2024	800 (LV)	± 3.5%	44%	48%	8%
The Bullfinch Group	June 14–19, 2024	800 (RV)	± 3.46%	45%	44%	12%
Emerson College	June 13–18, 2024	1,000 (RV)	± 3.0%	45%	47%	8%
Emerson College	June 13–18, 2024	1,000 (RV)	± 3.0%	49%	51%	–
Mainstreet Research/Florida Atlantic University	May 30–31, 2024	1,012 (RV)	± 3.1%	43%	45%	12%
Mainstreet Research/Florida Atlantic University	May 30–31, 2024	923 (LV)	± 3.1%	45%	47%	8%
KAConsulting (R) (Note: Poll conducted for Vapor Technology Association)	May 15–19, 2024	600 (RV)	–	44%	44%	12%
Prime Group (Note: Poll sponsored by Citizens to Save Our Republic PAC, which opposes Trump and third party candidates)	May 9–16, 2024	487 (RV)	–	51%	49%	–
Bloomberg/Morning Consult	May 7–13, 2024	812 (RV)	± 3.0%	46%	48%	6%
Cook Political Report/BSG (R)/GS Strategy Group (D)	May 6–13, 2024	730 (LV)	± 3.6%	45%	48%	7%
The New York Times/Siena College/The Philadelphia Inquirer	April 28 – May 9, 2024	1,023 (RV)	± 3.6%	44%	47%	9%
The New York Times/Siena College/The Philadelphia Inquirer	April 28 – May 9, 2024	1,023 (LV)	± 3.6%	45%	48%	7%
Fabrizio Ward (R)/Impact Research (D)	April 24–30, 2024	1,398 (LV)	± 3.0%	45%	49%	6%
Emerson College	April 25–29, 2024	1,000 (RV)	± 3.0%	45%	47%	8%
Emerson College	April 25–29, 2024	1,000 (RV)	± 3.0%	49%	51%	–
CBS News/YouGov	April 19–25, 2024	1,288 (LV)	± 3.1%	49%	50%	1%
Muhlenberg College	April 15–25, 2024	417 (RV)	± 6.0%	41%	44%	15%
John Zogby Strategies (Note: Poll conducted for Kennedy's campaign)	April 13–21, 2024	628 (LV)	–	50%	45%	5%
Kaplan Strategies	April 20–21, 2024	802 (RV)	± 3.5%	41%	46%	13%
Fox News	April 11–16, 2024	1,141 (RV)	± 3.0%	48%	48%	4%
Bloomberg/Morning Consult	April 8–15, 2024	803 (RV)	± 3.0%	46%	47%	7%
The Bullfinch Group	March 29 – April 3, 2024	600 (RV)	± 4.0%	38%	44%	18% (Note: Independent/Third party candidate with 12%)
Franklin & Marshall College	March 20–31, 2024	870 (RV)	± 4.0%	48%	38%	14%
Big Data Poll (R)	March 26–30, 2024	1,305 (RV)	± 2.6%	40%	46%	14% (Note: "Someone else / third party" with 8%)
Big Data Poll (R)	March 26–30, 2024	1,305 (RV)	± 2.6%	42%	44%	14%
Big Data Poll (R)	March 26–30, 2024	1,305 (RV)	± 2.6%	49%	51%	−
The Wall Street Journal	March 17–24, 2024	600 (RV)	± 4.0%	44%	47%	9%
Echelon Insights (Note: Poll sponsored by The Heritage Foundation)	March 12–19, 2024	400 (LV)	± 5.5%	45%	49%	6%
CNN/SSRS	March 13–18, 2024	1,132 (RV)	± 3.8%	46%	46%	8%
Emerson College	March 10–13, 2024	1,000 (RV)	± 3.0%	43%	47%	10%
Emerson College	March 10–13, 2024	1,000 (RV)	± 3.0%	48%	52%	–
Bloomberg/Morning Consult	March 8–12, 2024	807 (RV)	± 3.0%	45%	45%	10%
Fox News	March 7–11, 2024	1,149 (RV)	± 3.0%	47%	49%	4%
Susquehanna Polling & Research	February 27 – March 7, 2024	450 (LV)	± 4.6%	50%	45%	5%
Bloomberg/Morning Consult	February 12–20, 2024	803 (RV)	± 3.0%	43%	49%	8%
Emerson College	February 14–16, 2024	1,000 (RV)	± 3.0%	43%	45%	12%
Chism Strategies	February 6–8, 2024	500 (RV)	± 5.0%	32%	40%	28%
Public Opinion Strategies (R)	January 22–25, 2024	800 (LV)	± 3.5%	42%	48%	10%
Franklin & Marshall College	January 17–28, 2024	507 (RV)	± 5.0%	43%	42%	15%
Focaldata	January 17–23, 2024	834 (A)	–	38%	46%	16% (Note: "Another candidate" with 10%)
Focaldata	January 17–23, 2024	– (LV)	–	42%	47%	11% (Note: "Another candidate" with 7%)
Focaldata	January 17–23, 2024	– (LV)	–	49%	51%	–
Bloomberg/Morning Consult	January 16–21, 2024	795 (RV)	± 3.0%	45%	48%	7%
Susquehanna Polling & Research	January 15–21, 2024	745 (RV)	± 3.7%	47%	39%	14%
Quinnipiac University	January 4–8, 2024	1,680 (RV)	± 2.4%	49%	46%	5% (Note: "Undecided" & "Wouldn't vote" with 2%; "Someone else" with 1%)
The Bullfinch Group	December 14–18, 2023	600 (RV)	± 4.0%	45%	45%	10%
Change Research/Future Majority (D)	December 3–7, 2023	(RVs)	–	40%	46%	14%
Muhlenberg College	November 20 – December 13, 2023	421 (RV)	± 6.0%	42%	41%	17%
Bloomberg/Morning Consult	November 27 – December 6, 2023	799 (RV)	± 3.0%	44%	46%	10%
Big Data Poll (R)	November 16–19, 2023	1,382 (RV)	± 2.6%	37%	41%	22% (Note: "Someone else / third party" with 11%; "Would not vote" with 3%)
Big Data Poll (R)	November 16–19, 2023	1,284 (LV)	± 2.6%	39%	41%	20% (Note: "Someone else / third party" with 11%; "Would not vote" with 1%)
Bloomberg/Morning Consult	October 30 – November 7, 2023	805 (RV)	± 3.0%	44%	47%	9%
Emerson College	October 30 – November 4, 2023	1,000 (RV)	± 3.0%	43%	46%	11%
Emerson College	October 30 – November 4, 2023	816 (LV)	–	45%	49%	6%
The New York Times/Siena College	October 22 – November 3, 2023	600 (RV)	± 4.6%	44%	48%	8%
The New York Times/Siena College	October 22 – November 3, 2023	(600 LV)	± 4.6%	44%	49%	7%
Franklin & Marshall College	October 11–22, 2023	873 (RV)	± 4.1%	44%	42%	14%
Bloomberg/Morning Consult	October 5–10, 2023	807 (RV)	± 3.0%	45%	46%	9%
Redfield & Wilton Strategies	October 7–9, 2023	900 (LV)	–	43%	42%	15%
Emerson College	October 1–4, 2023	430 (RV)	± 4.7%	36%	45%	19%
Quinnipiac University	September 28 – October 2, 2023	1,725 (RV)	± 2.4%	45%	47%	8%
Susquehanna Polling & Research (R)	September 19–28, 2023	700 (RV)	± 3.7%	47%	45%	8% (Note: "Other" with 4%)
Public Policy Polling (D) (Note: Poll commissioned by Save My Country Action Fund)	September 25–26, 2023	673 (RV)	± 3.8%	48%	45%	7%
National Public Affairs	September 14–17, 2023	622 (LV)	± 3.9%	47%	45%	8%
Franklin & Marshall College	August 9–20, 2023	723 (RV)	± 4.5%	42%	40%	18%
Prime Group	June 14–28, 2023	500 (RV)	–	50%	50%	–
Prime Group	June 14–28, 2023	500 (RV)	–	38%	43%	19% (Note: No Labels candidate)
Quinnipiac University	June 22–26, 2023	1,584 (RV)	± 2.5%	46%	47%	7%
Public Opinion Strategies (R) (Note: Poll conducted for the Citizen Awareness Project)	June 17–19, 2023	500 (RV)	± 4.4%	48%	45%	7%
Public Opinion Strategies (R)	April 11–13, 2023	500 (RV)	± 4.4%	46%	42%	12%
Franklin & Marshall College	March 27 – April 7, 2023	643 (RV)	± 4.9%	36%	35%	29%
Susquehanna Polling & Research	February 19–26, 2023	800 (RV)	± 3.2%	48%	41%	11%
Targoz Market Research	November 2–6, 2022	904 (RV)	–	48%	48%	4%
Targoz Market Research	November 2–6, 2022	631 (LV)	± 3.8%	46%	52%	2%
Emerson College	October 28–31, 2022	1,000 (LV)	± 3.0%	44%	44%	12%
Emerson College	September 23–26, 2022	1,000 (LV)	± 3.0%	45%	46%	9%
Echelon Insights	August 31 – September 7, 2022	828 (LV)	± 3.5%	48%	43%	9%
Emerson College	August 22–23, 2022	1,034 (LV)	± 3.0%	42%	47%	11%
PEM Management Corporation (R) (Note: Poll conducted for the John Bolton Super PAC)	July 22–24, 2022	300 (LV)	± 5.7%	42%	44%	14%
Blueprint Polling (D)	July 19–21, 2022	712 (LV)	± 3.7%	42%	41%	17%
Blueprint Polling (D)	February 15–16, 2022	635 (LV)	± 3.9%	45%	40%	15%
Fabrizio, Lee & Associates (R)	November 11–16, 2021	600 (LV)	± 4.0%	45%	51%	4%

Joe Biden vs. Donald Trump vs. Robert F. Kennedy Jr. vs. Cornel West vs. Jill Stein

Poll source	Date(s) administered	Sample size	Margin of error	Joe Biden Democratic	Donald Trump Republican	Robert Kennedy Jr Independent	Cornel West Independent	Jill Stein Green	Other / Undecided
Emerson College	July 15–16, 2024	1,000 (RV)	± 3.0%	40%	46%	4%	1%	1%	8%
Rasmussen Reports (R)	July 5–12, 2024	1,041 (LV)	± 3.0%	42%	46%	6%	1%	2%	3%
YouGov	July 4–12, 2024	1,000 (RV)	± 3.4%	40%	43%	3%	1%	1%	12%
The New York Times/Siena College	July 9–11, 2024	872 (RV)	± 3.7%	38%	41%	8%	0%	2%	11%
The New York Times/Siena College	July 9–11, 2024	872 (LV)	± 3.7%	40%	42%	7%	0%	2%	9%
Echelon Insights	July 1–8, 2024	612 (LV)	± 4.9%	44%	42%	6%	1%	2%	5% (Note: Chase Oliver (L) with 1%)
Bloomberg/Morning Consult	July 1–5, 2024	794 (RV)	± 3.0%	41%	44%	7%	1%	1%	6%
Cygnal (R)	June 27–28, 2024	800 (LV)	± 3.5%	38%	42%	9%	2%	2%	7%
Emerson College	June 13–18, 2024	1,000 (RV)	± 3.0%	42%	45%	5%	0%	1%	12%
Marist College	June 3–6, 2024	1,181 (RV)	± 3.6%	45%	47%	3%	1%	1%	3% (Note: Chase Oliver (L) with >1%)
KAConsulting (R)	May 15–19, 2024	600 (RV)	–	39%	41%	9%	1%	3%	7% (Note: Lars Mapstead with 1%)
Prime Group	May 9–16, 2024	487 (RV)	–	45%	42%	9%	2%	2%	–
Bloomberg/Morning Consult	May 7–13, 2024	812 (RV)	± 3.0%	42%	45%	7%	2%	1%	3%
Cook Political Report/BSG (R)/GS Strategy Group (D)	May 6–13, 2024	730 (LV)	± 3.6%	40%	43%	7%	2%	2%	6%
The New York Times/Siena College/The Philadelphia Inquirer	April 28 – May 9, 2024	1,023 (RV)	± 3.6%	36%	40%	10%	0%	1%	13% (Note: Lars Mapstead (L) with 0%)
The New York Times/Siena College/The Philadelphia Inquirer	April 28 – May 9, 2024	1,023 (LV)	± 3.6%	37%	41%	9%	0%	1%	12%
Emerson College	April 25–29, 2024	1,000 (RV)	± 3.0%	41%	45%	6%	1%	1%	7%
Fox News	April 11–16, 2024	1,141 (RV)	± 3.0%	42%	44%	8%	1%	2%	3%
Bloomberg/Morning Consult	April 8–15, 2024	803 (RV)	± 3.0%	42%	43%	8%	0%	1%	6%
The Wall Street Journal	March 17–24, 2024	600 (RV)	± 4.0%	38%	41%	7%	3%	1%	10%
Emerson College	March 10–13, 2024	1,000 (RV)	± 3.0%	40%	44%	5%	1%	1%	9%
Bloomberg/Morning Consult	March 8–12, 2024	807 (RV)	± 3.0%	38%	44%	7%	0%	1%	10%
Fox News	March 7–11, 2024	1,149 (RV)	± 3.0%	42%	42%	9%	2%	2%	3%
Axis Research (Note: Poll sponsored by the Pennsylvania Energy Infrastructure Alliance)	February 25–27, 2024	601 (RV)	± 4.1%	40%	39%	8%	1%	2%	20%
Bloomberg/Morning Consult	February 12–20, 2024	803 (RV)	± 3.0%	36%	45%	8%	1%	1%	9%
Emerson College	February 14–16, 2024	1,000 (RV)	± 3.0%	37%	42%	8%	2%	1%	10%
Bloomberg/Morning Consult	January 16–21, 2024	795 (RV)	± 3.0%	40%	43%	7%	1%	1%	8%
Quinnipiac University	January 4–8, 2023	1,680 (RV)	± 2.4%	41%	39%	11%	2%	4%	3% (Note: "Undecided" with 2%; "Someone else" with 1%)
Bloomberg/Morning Consult	November 27 – December 6, 2023	799 (RV)	± 3.0%	38%	39%	9%	1%	1%	12%
Big Data Poll (R)	November 16–19, 2023	1,382 (RV)	± 2.6%	35%	40%	9%	1%	1%	14% (Note: "Would not vote" with 3%)
Big Data Poll (R)	November 16–19, 2023	1,284 (LV)	± 2.6%	37%	41%	9%	1%	1%	11%

Joe Biden vs. Donald Trump vs. Robert F. Kennedy Jr. vs. Jill Stein

Poll source	Date(s) administered	Sample size	Margin of error	Joe Biden Democratic	Donald Trump Republican	Robert Kennedy Jr Independent	Jill Stein Green	Other / Undecided
Public Policy Polling (D)	July 17–18, 2024	624 (RV)	± 3.8%	42%	46%	4%	2%	6%
Redfield & Wilton Strategies	July 16–18, 2024	688 (LV)	–	41%	45%	4%	1%	9% (Note: Chase Oliver (L) with 0%)
Redfield & Wilton Strategies	July 8–10, 2024	719 (LV)	–	40%	45%	6%	1%	8%
Redfield & Wilton Strategies	June 8–11, 2024	456 (LV)	–	42%	44%	5%	1%	8%
Redfield & Wilton Strategies	May 2–4, 2024	635 (LV)	–	41%	43%	7%	0%	9%
Fabrizio Ward (R)/Impact Research (D)	April 24–30, 2024	1,398 (LV)	± 3.0%	41%	46%	–	5%	9%
Franklin & Marshall College	March 20–31, 2024	870 (RV)	± 4.0%	42%	40%	9%	3%	8%
Big Data Poll (R)	March 26–30, 2024	1,305 (RV)	± 2.6%	40%	44%	8%	2%	6%
Big Data Poll (R)	March 26–30, 2024	1,305 (RV)	± 2.6%	42%	46%	9%	3%	−
Redfield & Wilton Strategies	March 14–17, 2024	775 (LV)	–	41%	44%	7%	1%	7%
Franklin & Marshall College	January 17–28, 2024	494 (RV)	± 5.0%	42%	37%	8%	2%	11%

Joe Biden vs. Donald Trump vs. Robert F. Kennedy Jr.

Poll source	Date(s) administered	Sample size	Margin of error	Joe Biden Democratic	Donald Trump Republican	Robert Kennedy Jr Independent	Other / Undecided
Civiqs	July 13–16, 2024	536 (RV)	± 4.7%	42%	46%	6%	6%
1983 Labs	June 28–30, 2024	741 (LV)	± 3.6%	41%	46%	3%	10%
Mainstreet Research/Florida Atlantic University	May 30–31, 2024	1,012 (RV)	± 3.1%	41%	39%	8%	12%
Mainstreet Research/Florida Atlantic University	May 30–31, 2024	923 (LV)	± 3.1%	43%	42%	7%	8%
Muhlenberg College	April 15–25, 2024	417 (RV)	± 6.0%	35%	35%	18%	12%
Big Data Poll (R)	March 26–30, 2024	1,305 (RV)	± 2.6%	39%	45%	7%	6% (Note: "Someone else / third party" with 4%)
Big Data Poll (R)	March 26–30, 2024	1,305 (RV)	± 2.6%	40%	45%	8%	7% (Note: "Someone else / third party" with 7%)
The Bullfinch Group	March 22–26, 2024	800 (RV)	± 3.5%	44%	41%	7%	8%
Redfield & Wilton Strategies	December 28–30, 2023	1,069 (LV)	–	39%	40%	9%	12%
Redfield & Wilton Strategies	November 27–29, 2023	887 (LV)	–	37%	44%	7%	10%
Big Data Poll (R)	November 16–19, 2023	1,382 (RV)	± 2.6%	36%	40%	8%	16% (Note: "Another third party candidate" with 6%; "Would not vote" with 2%)
Big Data Poll (R)	November 16–19, 2023	1,284 (LV)	± 2.6%	38%	41%	8%	13% (Note: "Another third party candidate" with 6%; "Would not vote" with 1%)
The New York Times/Siena College	October 22 – November 3, 2023	600 (RV)	± 4.6	35%	35%	23%	7%
The New York Times/Siena College	October 22 – November 3, 2023	600 (LV)	± 4.6	36%	36%	21%	7%
Redfield & Wilton Strategies	October 7–9, 2023	900 (LV)	–	39%	39%	9%	13%

Joe Biden vs. Donald Trump vs. Robert F. Kennedy Jr. vs. Cornel West

Poll source	Date(s) administered	Sample size	Margin of error	Joe Biden Democratic	Donald Trump Republican	Robert Kennedy Jr Independent	Cornel West Independent	Other / Undecided
CNN/SSRS	March 13–18, 2024	1,132 (RV)	± 3.8%	38%	40%	16%	4%	4%
Bloomberg/Morning Consult	October 30 – November 7, 2023	805 (RV)	± 3.0%	38%	41%	8%	1%	12%

Hypothetical polling with other candidates

Joe Biden vs. Robert F. Kennedy Jr.

Poll source	Date(s) administered	Sample size	Margin of error	Joe Biden Democratic	Robert F. Kennedy Jr. Independent	Other / Undecided
John Zogby Strategies	April 13–21, 2024	628 (LV)	–	47%	42%	11%

Robert F. Kennedy Jr. vs. Donald Trump

Poll source	Date(s) administered	Sample size	Margin of error	Robert F. Kennedy Jr. Independent	Donald Trump Republican	Other / Undecided
John Zogby Strategies	April 13–21, 2024	628 (LV)	–	40%	41%	19%

Gavin Newsom vs. Donald Trump

Poll source	Date(s) administered	Sample size	Margin of error	Gavin Newsom Democratic	Donald Trump Republican	Other / Undecided
Public Policy Polling (D)	July 11–12, 2024	537 (RV)	–	42%	51%	7%
Emerson College	February 14–16, 2024	1,000 (RV)	± 3.0%	33%	48%	19%

Gretchen Whitmer vs. Donald Trump

Poll source	Date(s) administered	Sample size	Margin of error	Gretchen Whitmer Democratic	Donald Trump Republican	Other / Undecided
Fox News	July 22–24, 2024	1,034 (RV)	± 3.0%	48%	49%	3%
Public Policy Polling (D)	July 11–12, 2024	537 (RV)	–	42%	50%	8%

JB Pritzker vs. Donald Trump

Poll source	Date(s) administered	Sample size	Margin of error	JB Pritzker Democratic	Donald Trump Republican	Other / Undecided
Public Policy Polling (D)	July 11–12, 2024	537 (RV)	–	37%	50%	13%

Josh Shapiro vs. Donald Trump

Poll source	Date(s) administered	Sample size	Margin of error	Josh Shapiro Democratic	Donald Trump Republican	Other / Undecided
Fox News	July 22–24, 2024	1,034 (RV)	± 3.0%	54%	44%	2%
Public Policy Polling (D)	July 11–12, 2024	537 (RV)	–	47%	46%	7%
Muhlenberg College	November 20 – December 13, 2023	421 (RV)	± 6.0%	48%	37%	15%

Josh Shapiro vs. Donald Trump vs Robert F. Kennedy Jr. vs. Jill Stein

Poll source	Date(s) administered	Sample size	Margin of error	Josh Shapiro Democratic	Donald Trump Republican	Robert Kennedy Jr Independent	Jill Stein Green	Other / Undecided
Public Policy Polling (D)	July 17–18, 2024	624 (RV)	± 3.8%	47%	43%	3%	1%	6%

Pete Buttigieg vs. Donald Trump

Poll source	Date(s) administered	Sample size	Margin of error	Pete Buttigieg Democratic	Donald Trump Republican	Other / Undecided
Public Policy Polling (D)	July 11–12, 2024	537 (RV)	–	41%	50%	9%

Joe Biden vs. Nikki Haley

Poll source	Date(s) administered	Sample size	Margin of error	Joe Biden Democratic	Nikki Haley Republican	Other / Undecided
Muhlenberg College	November 20 – December 13, 2023	421 (RV)	± 6.0%	33%	38%	29%
The New York Times/Siena College	October 22 – November 3, 2023	600 (RV)	± 4.6%	38%	48%	14%
The New York Times/Siena College	October 22 – November 3, 2023	600 (LV)	± 4.6%	39%	49%	12%
Susquehanna Polling & Research (R)	September 19–28, 2023	700 (RV)	± 3.7%	44%	45%	11%

Joe Biden vs. Nikki Haley vs. Robert F. Kennedy Jr.

Poll source	Date(s) administered	Sample size	Margin of error	Joe Biden Democratic	Nikki Haley Republican	Robert Kennedy Jr Independent	Other / Undecided
Redfield & Wilton Strategies	November 27–29, 2023	887 (LV)	–	36%	26%	18%	20% (Note: "Other (Third Party/Write-In)" with 3%; "Won't vote" with 2%; "Other (L)" & "Other (G)" with 1% each)

Joe Biden vs. Nikki Haley vs. Robert F. Kennedy Jr. vs. Cornel West vs. Jill Stein

Poll source	Date(s) administered	Sample size	Margin of error	Joe Biden Democratic	Nikki Haley Republican	Robert Kennedy Jr Independent	Cornel West Independent	Jill Stein Green	Other / Undecided
Axis Research	February 25–27, 2024	601 (RV)	± 4.1%	39%	19%	13%	1%	1%	27%

Joe Biden vs. Ron DeSantis

Poll source	Date(s) administered	Sample size	Margin of error	Joe Biden Democratic	Ron DeSantis Republican	Other / Undecided
Muhlenberg College	November 20 – December 13, 2023	421 (RV)	± 6.0%	41%	39%	20%
The New York Times/Siena College	October 22 – November 3, 2023	600 (RV)	± 4.6%	43%	45%	12%
The New York Times/Siena College	October 22 – November 3, 2023	600 (LV)	± 4.6%	43%	47%	10%
Susquehanna Polling & Research (R)	May 2–8, 2023	700 (LV)	± 3.7%	48%	39%	12%
Public Opinion Strategies (R)	June 17–19, 2023	500 (RV)	± 4.4%	45%	48%	7%
Public Opinion Strategies (R)	April 11–13, 2023	500 (RV)	± 4.4%	42%	45%	13%
Echelon Insights	August 31 – September 7, 2022	828 (LV)	± 3.5%	46%	42%	12%

Joe Biden vs. Ron DeSantis vs. Robert F. Kennedy Jr.

Poll source	Date(s) administered	Sample size	Margin of error	Joe Biden Democratic	Ron DeSantis Republican	Robert Kennedy Jr Independent	Other / Undecided
Redfield & Wilton Strategies	November 27–29, 2023	887 (LV)	–	37%	34%	13%	12% (Note: "Other (Third Party/Write-In)", "Won't vote", & "Other (L)" with 1% each; "Other (G)" with 0%)

Robert F. Kennedy Jr. vs. Ron DeSantis

Poll source	Date(s) administered	Sample size	Margin of error	Robert F. Kennedy Jr. Democratic	Ron DeSantis Republican	Other / Undecided
Susquehanna Polling & Research (R)	May 2–8, 2023	700 (LV)	± 3.7%	42%	38%	20%

=== Results ===
State House district results: Trump 40–50% 50–60% 60–70% 70–80% 80–90% / Harris 50–60% 60–70% 70–80% 80–90% 90–100%

2024 United States presidential election in Pennsylvania
Party	Candidate	Votes	%	±%
Republican	Donald Trump; JD Vance	3,543,308	50.37	+1.53
Democratic	Kamala Harris; Tim Walz	3,423,042	48.66	−1.35
Green	Jill Stein; Butch Ware	34,538	0.49	+0.47
Libertarian	Chase Oliver; Mike ter Maat	33,318	0.47	−0.67
Total votes		7,034,206	100.00	N/A

==== By county ====
County	Donald Trump Republican		Kamala Harris Democratic		Various candidates Other parties		Margin		Total votes cast
County	#	%	#	%	#	%	#	%	Total votes cast
Adams	40,248	66.36%	19,842	32.72%	560	0.92%	20,406	33.64%	60,650
Allegheny	283,595	39.36%	429,916	59.67%	6,993	0.97%	-146,321	-20.31%	720,504
Armstrong	28,296	76.23%	8,553	23.04%	270	0.73%	19,743	53.19%	37,119
Beaver	56,837	59.93%	37,196	39.22%	810	0.85%	19,641	20.71%	94,843
Bedford	23,658	84.01%	4,336	15.40%	166	0.59%	19,322	68.61%	28,160
Berks	116,677	55.60%	91,125	43.43%	2,036	0.97%	25,552	12.17%	209,838
Blair	46,352	71.37%	18,127	27.91%	470	0.72%	28,225	43.46%	64,949
Bradford	22,937	73.53%	7,990	25.62%	265	0.85%	14,947	47.91%	31,192
Bucks	198,722	49.55%	198,431	49.48%	3,875	0.97%	291	0.07%	401,028
Butler	79,773	65.69%	40,661	33.48%	1,006	0.83%	39,112	32.21%	121,440
Cambria	49,408	69.46%	21,177	29.77%	551	0.77%	28,231	39.69%	71,136
Cameron	1,654	74.54%	538	24.25%	27	1.21%	1,116	50.29%	2,219
Carbon	23,708	66.98%	11,394	32.19%	293	0.83%	12,314	34.79%	35,395
Centre	38,829	48.06%	41,119	50.89%	844	1.05%	-2,290	-2.83%	80,792
Chester	137,299	42.25%	184,281	56.71%	3,384	1.04%	-46,982	-14.46%	324,964
Clarion	15,036	76.20%	4,562	23.12%	135	0.68%	10,474	53.08%	19,733
Clearfield	30,481	75.39%	9,647	23.86%	302	0.75%	20,834	51.53%	40,430
Clinton	12,965	70.00%	5,395	29.13%	162	0.87%	7,570	40.87%	18,522
Columbia	21,190	65.05%	11,083	34.02%	303	0.93%	10,107	31.03%	32,576
Crawford	29,685	69.24%	12,858	29.99%	329	0.77%	16,827	39.25%	42,872
Cumberland	80,267	54.09%	66,255	44.65%	1,874	1.26%	14,012	9.44%	148,396
Dauphin	69,474	46.46%	78,327	52.38%	1,725	1.16%	-8,853	-5.92%	149,526
Delaware	123,421	37.61%	201,324	61.35%	3,427	1.04%	-77,903	-23.74%	328,172
Elk	12,543	73.12%	4,483	26.14%	127	0.74%	8,060	46.98%	17,153
Erie	68,866	50.05%	67,456	49.03%	1,273	0.92%	1,410	1.02%	137,595
Fayette	43,633	68.74%	19,548	30.80%	291	0.46%	24,085	37.94%	63,472
Forest	1,902	71.77%	724	27.32%	24	0.91%	1,178	44.45%	2,650
Franklin	59,604	71.06%	23,543	28.07%	737	0.87%	36,061	42.99%	83,884
Fulton	7,039	86.08%	1,102	13.48%	36	0.44%	5,937	72.60%	8,177
Greene	12,319	71.47%	4,592	26.64%	325	1.89%	7,727	44.83%	17,236
Huntingdon	17,627	76.12%	5,368	23.18%	161	0.70%	12,259	52.94%	23,156
Indiana	29,215	69.18%	12,697	30.07%	317	0.75%	16,518	39.11%	42,229
Jefferson	18,235	78.84%	4,707	20.35%	187	0.81%	13,528	58.49%	23,129
Juniata	9,721	80.31%	2,290	18.92%	93	0.77%	7,431	61.39%	12,104
Lackawanna	56,261	48.26%	59,510	50.04%	819	0.70%	-3,249	-2.78%	116,590
Lancaster	166,261	57.48%	120,119	41.53%	2,877	0.99%	46,142	15.95%	289,257
Lawrence	31,347	66.54%	15,440	32.77%	323	0.69%	15,907	33.77%	47,110
Lebanon	48,282	65.52%	24,734	33.56%	676	0.92%	23,548	31.96%	73,692
Lehigh	91,207	48.05%	96,317	50.74%	2,286	1.21%	-5,110	-2.69%	189,810
Luzerne	92,444	59.20%	62,504	40.03%	1,202	0.77%	29,940	19.17%	156,150
Lycoming	41,961	70.30%	17,216	28.84%	508	0.85%	24,745	41.46%	59,685
McKean	14,401	73.17%	5,115	25.99%	166	0.84%	9,286	47.18%	19,682
Mercer	37,761	64.65%	20,145	34.49%	504	0.86%	17,616	30.16%	58,410
Mifflin	17,184	77.86%	4,735	21.45%	152	0.69%	12,449	56.41%	22,071
Monroe	42,676	49.90%	42,007	49.12%	842	0.98%	669	0.78%	85,525
Montgomery	198,311	38.07%	317,103	60.88%	5,492	1.05%	-118,792	-22.81%	520,906
Montour	5,944	59.99%	3,862	38.98%	102	1.03%	2,082	21.01%	9,908
Northampton	89,817	50.40%	86,655	48.62%	1,743	0.98%	3,162	1.78%	178,215
Northumberland	30,240	69.48%	12,863	29.56%	419	0.96%	17,377	39.92%	43,522
Perry	19,073	74.14%	6,385	24.82%	267	1.04%	12,688	49.32%	25,725
Philadelphia	144,311	20.00%	568,571	78.81%	8,559	1.19%	-424,260	-58.81%	721,441
Pike	21,537	61.62%	13,132	37.57%	281	0.81%	8,405	24.05%	34,950
Potter	7,334	80.73%	1,675	18.44%	76	0.83%	5,659	62.29%	9,085
Schuylkill	51,665	70.60%	20,882	28.53%	637	0.87%	30,783	41.97%	73,184
Snyder	14,664	73.18%	5,239	26.15%	135	0.67%	9,425	47.03%	20,038
Somerset	31,993	78.26%	8,596	21.03%	292	0.71%	23,397	57.23%	40,881
Sullivan	2,721	73.13%	976	26.23%	24	0.64%	1,745	46.90%	3,721
Susquehanna	16,114	71.92%	6,093	27.20%	197	0.88%	10,021	44.72%	22,404
Tioga	16,272	75.38%	5,100	23.63%	215	0.99%	11,172	51.75%	21,587
Union	12,969	61.21%	8,015	37.83%	204	0.96%	4,954	23.38%	21,188
Venango	18,883	70.64%	7,624	28.52%	225	0.84%	11,259	42.12%	26,732
Warren	14,345	69.22%	6,212	29.98%	166	0.80%	8,133	39.24%	20,723
Washington	75,929	62.43%	44,910	36.93%	778	0.64%	31,019	25.50%	121,617
Wayne	20,071	68.17%	9,150	31.08%	223	0.75%	10,921	37.09%	29,444
Westmoreland	135,008	63.85%	74,904	35.42%	1,538	0.73%	60,104	28.43%	211,450
Wyoming	10,222	67.91%	4,680	31.09%	150	1.00%	5,542	36.82%	15,052
York	154,884	62.15%	91,926	36.89%	2,400	0.96%	62,958	25.26%	249,210
Totals	3,543,308	50.37%	3,423,042	48.66%	68,485	0.97%	120,266	1.71%	7,034,835

==== Counties that flipped from Democratic to Republican ====
- Bucks (largest city: Bensalem)
- Erie (largest city: Erie)
- Monroe (largest city: East Stroudsburg)
- Northampton (largest city: Bethlehem)

==== By congressional district ====
Trump won nine of 17 congressional districts, with the remaining eight going to Harris, including one that elected a Republican.

District	Harris	Trump	Representative
1st	49.68%	49.35%	Brian Fitzpatrick
2nd	67.28%	31.54%	Brendan Boyle
3rd	88.06%	10.74%	Dwight Evans
4th	57.39%	41.57%	Madeleine Dean
5th	63.79%	35.16%	Mary Gay Scanlon
6th	55.19%	43.79%	Chrissy Houlahan
7th	47.87%	51.07%	Susan Wild (118th Congress)
7th	47.87%	51.07%	Ryan Mackenzie (119th Congress)
8th	45.35%	53.85%	Matt Cartwright (118th Congress)
8th	45.35%	53.85%	Rob Bresnahan (119th Congress)
9th	30.59%	68.51%	Dan Meuser
10th	46.81%	52.04%	Scott Perry
11th	38.83%	60.19%	Lloyd Smucker
12th	59.13%	39.95%	Summer Lee
13th	26.83%	72.37%	John Joyce
14th	32.97%	66.32%	Guy Reschenthaler
15th	30.58%	68.57%	Glenn Thompson
16th	38.19%	60.97%	Mike Kelly
17th	52.28%	46.77%	Chris Deluzio

== Analysis ==
A Northeastern swing state within the Rust Belt, Pennsylvania was seen as a pure toss-up this cycle. In 2016, Trump narrowly carried the state by 0.7% in his upset sweep of the Rust Belt and the first Republican presidential victory in Pennsylvania since 1988, but four years later lost the state to Democratic nominee Joe Biden by 1.2% as the latter defeated the former nationwide.

Compared to 2020, Trump gained in nearly every county except for a few scattered around the interior of the state. His strongest gains were concentrated in Northeastern Pennsylvania, which, prior to his first run in 2016, was Democratic and historically had an economy focused around coal mining. He also made notable gains in the Philadelphia area, even in the suburban counties that had shifted against him in both of his past runs.

Trump placed first in 58 counties, four more than he did in 2020. He won Erie and Northampton counties, which voted for him in 2016 and Biden in 2020. He was the first Republican to win Bucks since George H. W. Bush in 1988, and to win Monroe since George W. Bush in 2004. Trump's victory in the state made him the first Republican candidate to carry Pennsylvania twice since Ronald Reagan did so in 1980 and 1984.

=== Exit poll data ===
2024 presidential election in Pennsylvania voter demographics
Demographic subgroup	Trump	Harris	% of total vote
Ideology
Liberals	6	93	25
Moderates	43	56	41
Conservatives	91	8	34
Party
Democrats	5	95	36
Republicans	91	9	40
Independents	52	45	23
Gender
Men	58	41	48
Women	44	56	52
Race/ethnicity
White	56	44	83
Black	10	89	8
Latino	41	59	6
Asian	n/a	n/a	1
All other races	n/a	n/a	2
Gender by race/ethnicity
White men	60	39	41
White women	51	48	42
Black men	24	72	3
Black women	3	97	6
Latino men	n/a	n/a	2
Latina women	n/a	n/a	4
All other races	n/a	n/a	3
Age
18–29 years old	44	55	12
30–44 years old	47	52	26
45–64 years old	54	45	36
65 and older	52	48	25
First time voter
Yes	n/a	n/a	7
No	51	48	93
2020 presidential vote
Biden	5	94	44
Trump	97	3	44
Another candidate	n/a	n/a	2
Did not vote	54	45	8
Education
No college degree	58	41	59
College graduate	39	60	41
Education by race
White college graduates	42	58	35
White no college degree	65	34	47
Non-white college graduates	24	74	6
Non-white no college degree	26	73	11
Education by gender among White voters
White college graduate women	38	62	18
White women no degree	60	39	24
White college graduate men	46	53	17
White men no degree	71	28	23
Voters of color	26	73	17
Area type
Urban	30	69	21
Suburban	51	47	58
Rural	67	32	22
Biden job approval
Strongly disapprove	96	3	44
Somewhat disapprove	40	57	12
Somewhat approve	5	95	25
Strongly approve	3	97	17
Feeling about the way things are going in U.S.
Angry	74	25	31
Dissatisfied	55	44	40
Satisfied	15	84	20
Enthusiastic	n/a	n/a	6
Quality of candidate that mattered most
Has ability to lead	72	28	35
Can bring needed change	64	35	23
Has good judgment	20	79	20
Cares about people like me	19	79	17
Vote for president mainly
For your candidate	53	46	78
Against their opponent	36	62	19
Issue regarded as most important
Democracy	23	77	31
Economy	75	24	31
Abortion	23	77	15
Immigration	82	16	13
Foreign policy	n/a	n/a	3
Democracy threatened in the United States
Democracy in the U.S. very threatened	60	39	39
Democracy in the U.S. somewhat threatened	46	54	34
Democracy in the U.S. somewhat secure	40	59	19
Democracy in the U.S. very secure	n/a	n/a	6
Confident election being conducted fairly and accurately
Very confident	17	82	41
Somewhat confident	64	34	33
Not very confident	93	6	16
Not at all confident	n/a	n/a	5
Condition of the nation's economy
Poor	92	7	31
Not so good	50	49	36
Good	7	92	27
Excellent	n/a	n/a	4
Family's financial situation today
Worse than four years ago	83	16	48
About the same	22	78	29
Better than four years ago	8	92	22
Abortion should be
Legal in all cases	17	82	32
Legal in most cases	44	56	32
Illegal in most cases	93	5	24
Illegal in all cases	n/a	n/a	6
Union Household
Yes	44	56	20
No	50	49	80
View of fracking in your state
Favor	69	30	54
Oppose	18	81	37

== See also ==
- United States presidential elections in Pennsylvania
- 2024 Democratic Party presidential primaries
- 2024 Republican Party presidential primaries
- 2024 Pennsylvania elections
- 2024 United States elections

== Notes ==
Partisan clients
