= 1888 United States presidential election in Pennsylvania =

- November 6, 1888
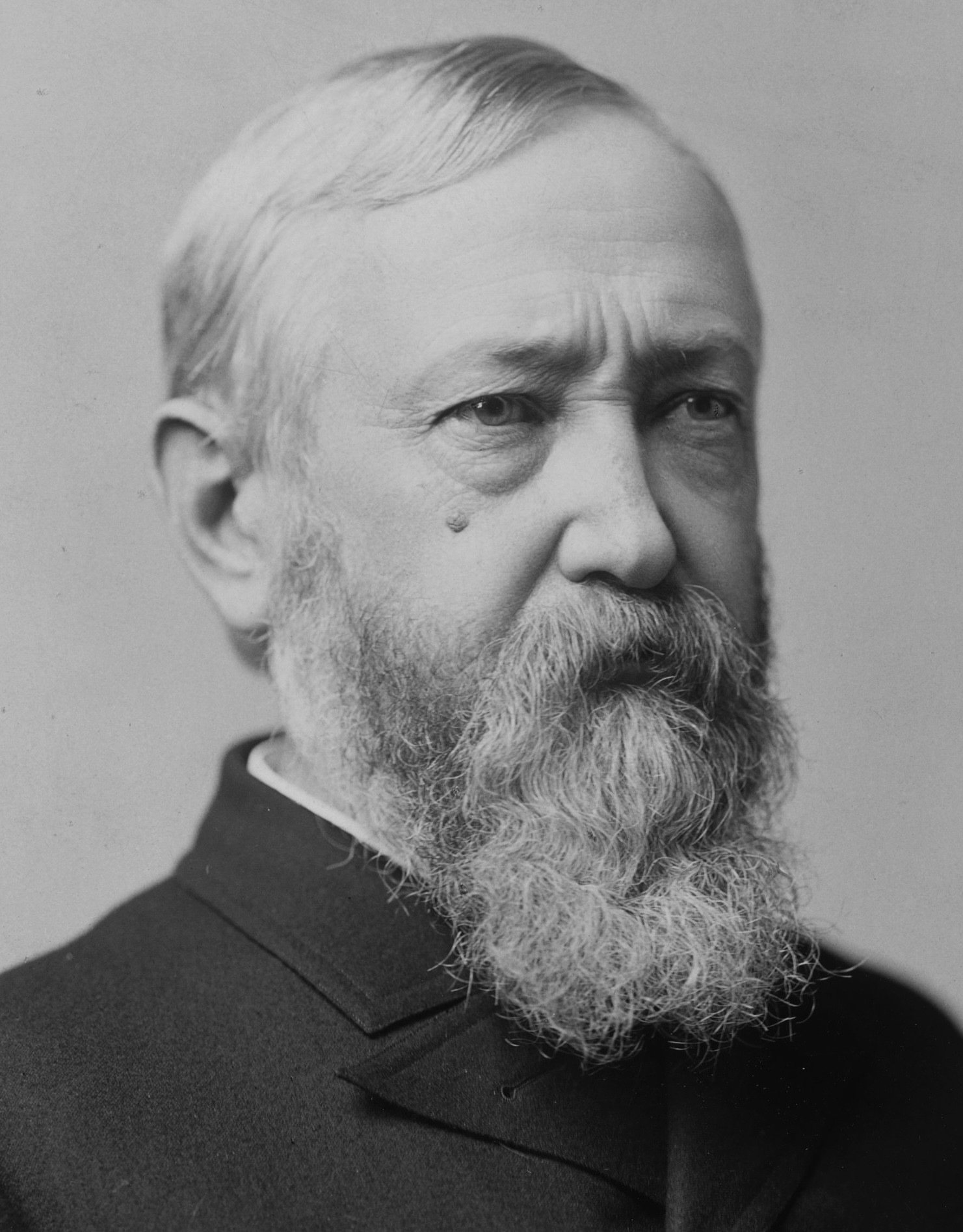

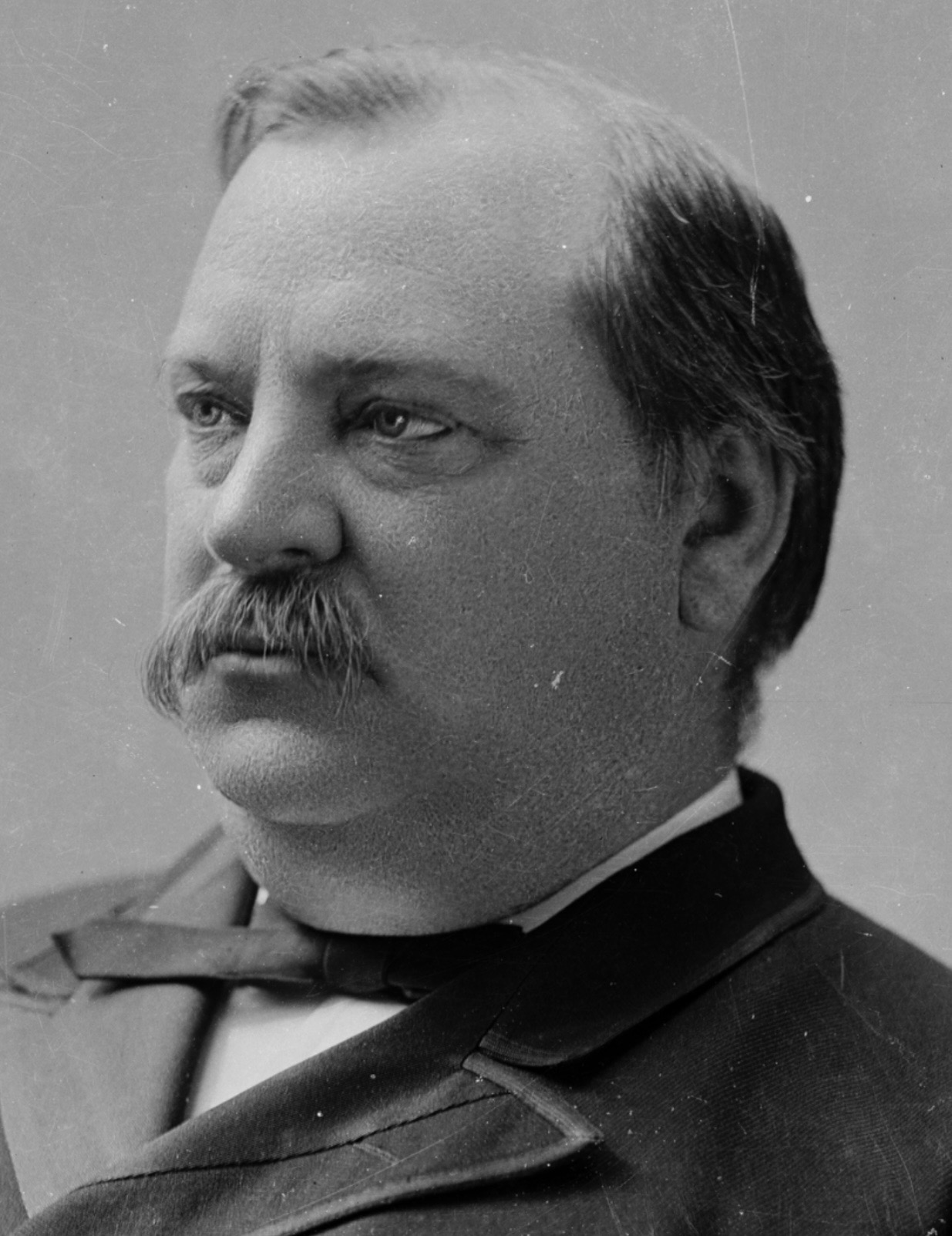
Nominee	Benjamin Harrison	Grover Cleveland
Party	Republican	Democratic
Home state	Indiana	New York
Running mate	Levi P. Morton	Allen G. Thurman
Electoral vote	30	0
Popular vote	526,091	446,633
Percentage	52.74%	44.77%
County results
Harrison
40–50%
50–60%
60–70%
Cleveland
40–50%
50–60%
60–70%
70–80%
President before election
Grover Cleveland
Democratic
Elected President
Benjamin Harrison
Republican

A presidential election was held in Pennsylvania on November 6, 1888, as part of the 1888 United States presidential election. Voters chose 30 representatives, or electors to the Electoral College, who voted for president and vice president.

Pennsylvania voted for the Republican nominee, Benjamin Harrison, over the Democratic nominee, incumbent President Grover Cleveland. Harrison won Pennsylvania by a margin of 7.97%.

== Results ==
1888 United States presidential election in Pennsylvania
Party	Candidate	Votes	Percentage	Electoral votes
Republican	Benjamin Harrison	526,091	52.74%	30
Democratic	Grover Cleveland (incumbent)	446,633	44.77%	0
Prohibition	Clinton B. Fisk	20,947	2.10%	0
Union Labor	Alson Streeter	3,873	0.39%	0
American	James Curtis	24	0.00%	0
Totals		997,568	100.0%	30

=== Results by county ===
County	Benjamin Harrison Republican		Grover Cleveland Democratic		Clinton B. Fisk Prohibition		Alson Streeter Union Labor		James Curtis American		Margin		Total votes cast
County	#	%	#	%	#	%	#	%	#	%	#	%	Total votes cast
Adams	3,371	46.54%	3,794	52.38%	76	1.05%	2	0.03%	0	0.00%	-423	-5.84%	7,243
Allegheny	45,118	63.58%	24,710	34.82%	1,117	1.57%	5	0.01%	16	0.02%	20,408	28.76%	70,966
Armstrong	5,030	55.89%	3,763	41.81%	193	2.14%	14	0.16%	0	0.00%	1,267	14.08%	9,000
Beaver	5,552	58.23%	3,706	38.87%	242	2.54%	34	0.36%	0	0.00%	1,846	19.36%	9,534
Bedford	4,287	52.19%	3,822	46.52%	82	1.00%	24	0.29%	0	0.00%	465	5.66%	8,215
Berks	10,626	36.65%	18,105	62.45%	252	0.87%	9	0.03%	0	0.00%	-7,479	-25.80%	28,992
Blair	7,311	56.95%	5,175	40.31%	316	2.46%	35	0.27%	0	0.00%	2,136	16.64%	12,837
Bradford	8,762	63.00%	4,552	32.73%	536	3.85%	58	0.42%	0	0.00%	4,210	30.27%	13,908
Bucks	8,584	49.11%	8,642	49.44%	253	1.45%	0	0.00%	0	0.00%	-58	-0.33%	17,479
Butler	5,358	53.84%	3,986	40.06%	434	4.36%	169	1.70%	4	0.04%	1,372	13.79%	9,951
Cambria	5,517	47.11%	5,948	50.79%	237	2.02%	9	0.08%	0	0.00%	-431	-3.68%	11,711
Cameron	782	58.14%	551	40.97%	12	0.89%	0	0.00%	0	0.00%	231	17.17%	1,345
Carbon	3,279	45.69%	3,665	51.07%	180	2.51%	53	0.74%	0	0.00%	-386	-5.38%	7,177
Centre	4,574	48.29%	4,712	49.75%	173	1.83%	12	0.13%	0	0.00%	-138	-1.46%	9,471
Chester	11,578	58.51%	7,541	38.11%	666	3.37%	3	0.02%	0	0.00%	4,037	20.40%	19,788
Clarion	2,950	41.71%	3,880	54.86%	117	1.65%	126	1.78%	0	0.00%	-930	-13.15%	7,073
Clearfield	5,297	44.51%	6,266	52.66%	337	2.83%	0	0.00%	0	0.00%	-969	-8.14%	11,900
Clinton	2,756	45.38%	3,204	52.76%	80	1.32%	33	0.54%	0	0.00%	-448	-7.38%	6,073
Columbia	2,484	33.38%	4,676	62.84%	258	3.47%	23	0.31%	0	0.00%	-2,192	-29.46%	7,441
Crawford	8,040	53.59%	5,964	39.75%	747	4.98%	252	1.68%	0	0.00%	2,076	13.84%	15,003
Cumberland	4,693	45.36%	5,386	52.05%	256	2.47%	12	0.12%	0	0.00%	-693	-6.70%	10,347
Dauphin	10,852	57.66%	7,684	40.82%	286	1.52%	0	0.00%	0	0.00%	3,168	16.83%	18,822
Delaware	8,791	62.04%	5,028	35.48%	346	2.44%	5	0.04%	0	0.00%	3,763	26.56%	14,170
Elk	1,321	41.09%	1,824	56.73%	52	1.62%	18	0.56%	0	0.00%	-503	-15.65%	3,215
Erie	9,372	54.23%	7,111	41.15%	710	4.11%	88	0.51%	0	0.00%	2,261	13.08%	17,281
Fayette	7,034	49.17%	6,951	48.59%	278	1.94%	43	0.30%	0	0.00%	83	0.58%	14,306
Forest	917	57.24%	612	38.20%	72	4.49%	1	0.06%	0	0.00%	305	19.04%	1,602
Franklin	5,772	52.27%	5,082	46.02%	174	1.58%	14	0.13%	0	0.00%	690	6.25%	11,042
Fulton	951	42.93%	1,230	55.53%	34	1.53%	0	0.00%	0	0.00%	-279	-12.60%	2,215
Greene	2,373	35.79%	4,116	62.08%	141	2.13%	0	0.00%	0	0.00%	-1,743	-26.29%	6,630
Huntingdon	4,217	58.56%	2,789	38.73%	117	1.62%	78	1.08%	0	0.00%	1,428	19.83%	7,201
Indiana	5,084	62.83%	2,231	27.57%	294	3.63%	483	5.97%	0	0.00%	2,853	35.26%	8,092
Jefferson	4,090	53.48%	3,257	42.59%	178	2.33%	123	1.61%	0	0.00%	833	10.89%	7,648
Juniata	1,760	47.58%	1,842	49.80%	96	2.60%	1	0.03%	0	0.00%	-82	-2.22%	3,699
Lackawanna	10,279	48.50%	9,858	46.51%	1,058	4.99%	0	0.00%	0	0.00%	421	1.99%	21,195
Lancaster	21,976	66.56%	10,495	31.79%	525	1.59%	16	0.05%	4	0.01%	11,481	34.77%	33,016
Lawrence	4,342	62.56%	2,113	30.44%	437	6.30%	49	0.71%	0	0.00%	2,229	32.11%	6,941
Lebanon	6,096	61.61%	3,670	37.09%	119	1.20%	10	0.10%	0	0.00%	2,426	24.52%	9,895
Lehigh	6,977	43.35%	8,927	55.47%	167	1.04%	23	0.14%	0	0.00%	-1,950	-12.12%	16,094
Luzerne	15,543	49.25%	15,218	48.22%	790	2.50%	7	0.02%	0	0.00%	325	1.03%	31,558
Lycoming	6,591	45.34%	7,467	51.37%	303	2.08%	175	1.20%	0	0.00%	-876	-6.03%	14,536
McKean	4,066	52.74%	2,922	37.90%	426	5.53%	295	3.83%	0	0.00%	1,144	14.84%	7,709
Mercer	6,428	53.91%	4,806	40.31%	556	4.66%	133	1.12%	0	0.00%	1,622	13.60%	11,923
Mifflin	2,321	51.46%	2,084	46.21%	105	2.33%	0	0.00%	0	0.00%	237	5.25%	4,510
Monroe	1,107	24.95%	3,274	73.79%	56	1.26%	0	0.00%	0	0.00%	-2,167	-48.84%	4,437
Montgomery	13,445	50.90%	12,582	47.63%	379	1.43%	11	0.04%	0	0.00%	863	3.27%	26,417
Montour	1,289	39.91%	1,865	57.74%	41	1.27%	35	1.08%	0	0.00%	-576	-17.83%	3,230
Northampton	6,785	39.67%	10,027	58.63%	192	1.12%	99	0.58%	0	0.00%	-3,242	-18.96%	17,103
Northumberland	6,288	48.96%	6,257	48.72%	231	1.80%	66	0.51%	0	0.00%	31	0.24%	12,842
Perry	3,168	53.04%	2,738	45.84%	66	1.10%	1	0.02%	0	0.00%	430	7.20%	5,973
Philadelphia	111,358	54.20%	92,786	45.16%	1,225	0.60%	75	0.04%	0	0.00%	18,572	9.04%	205,444
Pike	559	30.38%	1,265	68.75%	16	0.87%	0	0.00%	0	0.00%	-706	-38.37%	1,840
Potter	2,570	55.68%	1,692	36.66%	172	3.73%	182	3.94%	0	0.00%	878	19.02%	4,616
Schuylkill	12,522	48.20%	13,054	50.25%	211	0.81%	193	0.74%	0	0.00%	-532	-2.05%	25,980
Snyder	2,360	60.36%	1,493	38.18%	57	1.46%	0	0.00%	0	0.00%	867	22.17%	3,910
Somerset	4,825	65.36%	2,319	31.41%	238	3.22%	0	0.00%	0	0.00%	2,506	33.95%	7,382
Sullivan	946	40.95%	1,260	54.55%	48	2.08%	56	2.42%	0	0.00%	-314	-13.59%	2,310
Susquehanna	5,019	55.30%	3,328	36.67%	717	7.90%	12	0.13%	0	0.00%	1,691	18.63%	9,076
Tioga	7,808	69.23%	2,972	26.35%	254	2.25%	245	2.17%	0	0.00%	4,836	42.88%	11,279
Union	2,448	59.85%	1,582	38.68%	50	1.22%	10	0.24%	0	0.00%	866	21.17%	4,090
Venango	4,424	50.49%	3,475	39.66%	688	7.85%	175	2.00%	0	0.00%	949	10.83%	8,762
Warren	4,329	55.76%	2,640	34.00%	676	8.71%	119	1.53%	0	0.00%	1,689	21.75%	7,764
Washington	7,801	54.83%	5,847	41.10%	571	4.01%	8	0.06%	0	0.00%	1,954	13.73%	14,227
Wayne	2,939	46.47%	3,010	47.60%	375	5.93%	0	0.00%	0	0.00%	-71	-1.12%	6,324
Westmoreland	9,926	49.37%	9,602	47.76%	430	2.14%	147	0.73%	0	0.00%	324	1.61%	20,105
Wyoming	2,086	51.43%	1,841	45.39%	125	3.08%	4	0.10%	0	0.00%	245	6.04%	4,056
York	9,047	41.68%	12,359	56.94%	301	1.39%	0	0.00%	0	0.00%	-3,312	-15.26%	21,707
Totals	526,151	52.74%	446,633	44.77%	20,947	2.10%	3,873	0.39%	24	0.00%	79,518	7.97%	997,628

== See also ==
- United States presidential elections in Pennsylvania
