= 1856 United States presidential election in Pennsylvania =

- November 4, 1856
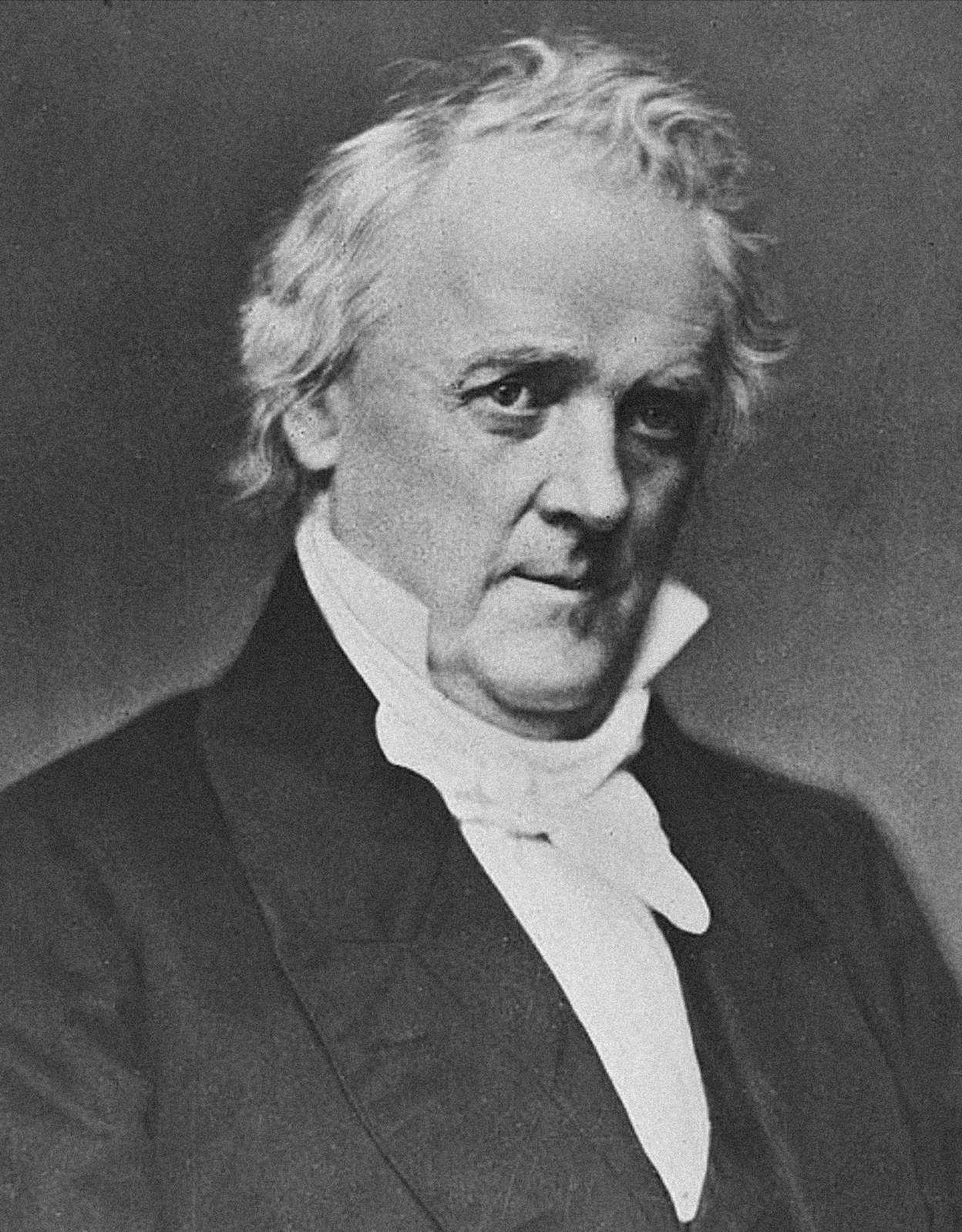

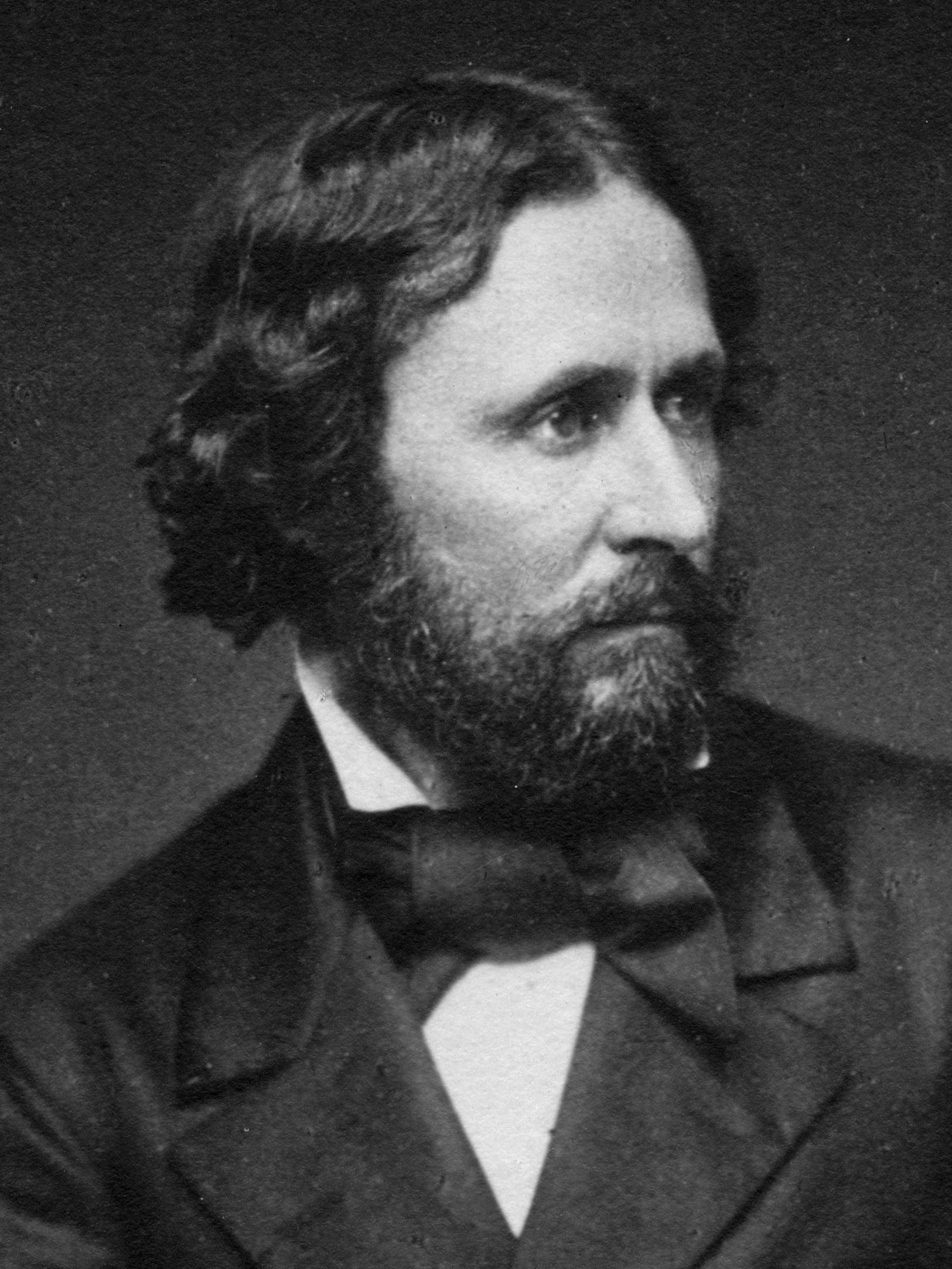

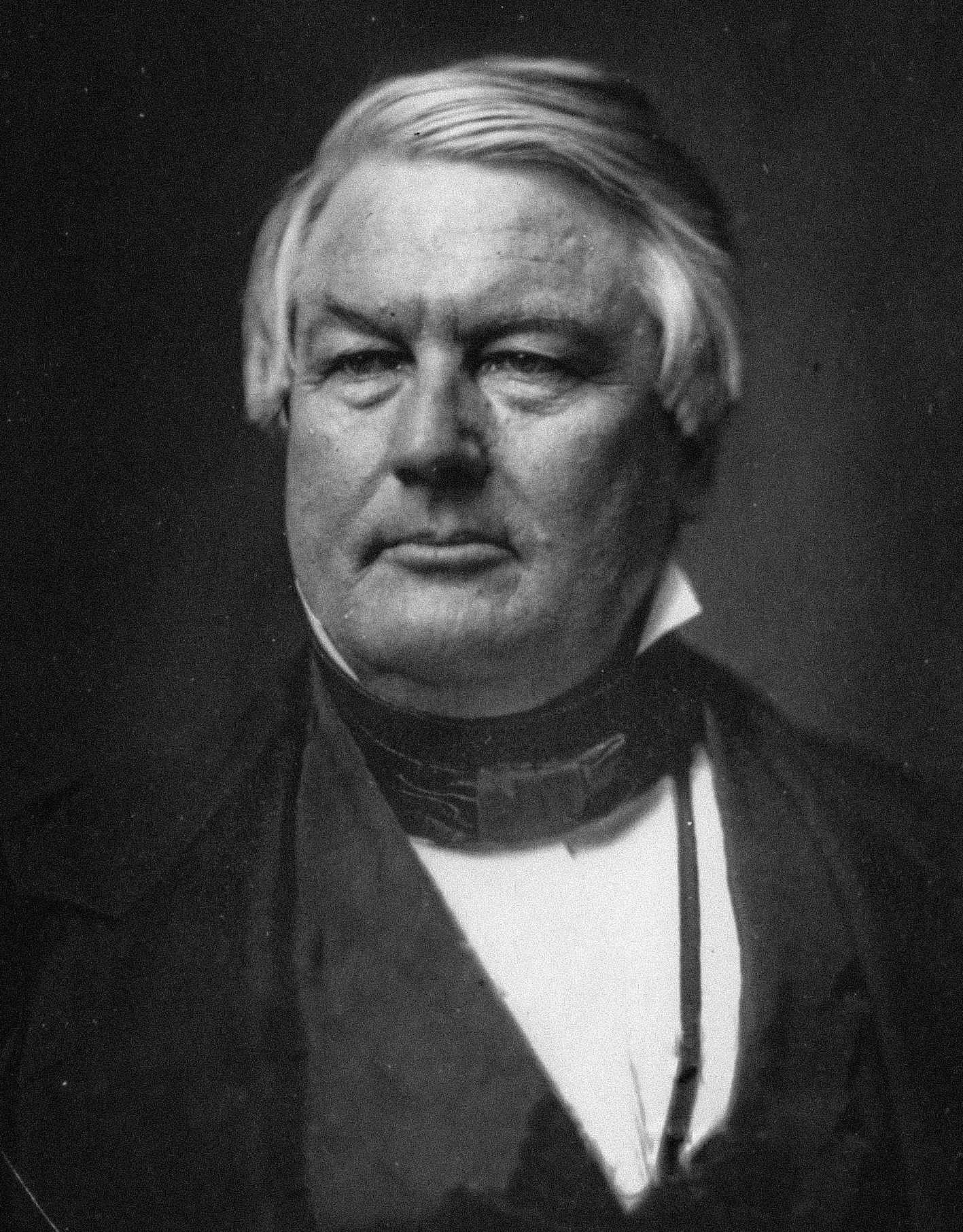
Nominee	James Buchanan	John C. Frémont	Millard Fillmore
Party	Democratic	Republican	Know Nothing
Home state	Pennsylvania	California	New York
Running mate	John C. Breckinridge	William L. Dayton	Andrew Jackson Donelson
Electoral vote	27	0	0
Popular vote	230,686	147,286	82,189
Percentage	50.13%	32.01%	17.86%
County results
Buchanan
30–40%
40–50%
50–60%
60–70%
70–80%
Fremont
50–60%
60–70%
70–80%
Fillmore
40–50%
President before election
Franklin Pierce
Democratic
Elected President
James Buchanan
Democratic

A presidential election was held in Pennsylvania on November 4, 1856, as part of the 1856 United States presidential election. Voters chose 27 representatives, or electors to the Electoral College, who voted for president and vice president.

Pennsylvania voted for the Democratic candidate, James Buchanan, over the Republican candidate, John C. Frémont, and the Know Nothing candidate, Millard Fillmore. Buchanan, a lifelong Pennsylvanian, won his home state by a margin of 18.12%.

Despite the margin of victory, this was the last time a Democrat won Pennsylvania until Franklin D. Roosevelt in 1936.

== Results ==
1856 United States presidential election in Pennsylvania
Party	Candidate	Votes	Percentage	Electoral votes
Democratic	James Buchanan	230,686	50.13%	27
Republican	John C. Frémont	147,286	32.01%	0
Know Nothing	Millard Fillmore	82,189	17.86%	0
Totals		460,161	100.0%	27

=== Results by county ===
1856 United States Presidential Election in Pennsylvania (by county)
County	James Buchanan Democratic		John C. Frémont Republican		Millard Fillmore Know Nothing		Total votes cast
County	#	%	#	%	#	%	Total votes cast
Adams	2,637	52.68%	1,120	22.37%	1,249	24.95%	5,006
Allegheny	9,062	37.41%	13,671	56.44%	1,488	6.14%	24,221
Armstrong	2,680	45.96%	2,963	50.81%	188	3.22%	5,831
Beaver	1,905	39.70%	2,658	55.39%	236	4.92%	4,799
Bedford	2,458	52.30%	306	6.51%	1,936	41.19%	4,700
Berks	11,272	70.92%	1,037	6.52%	3,586	22.56%	15,895
Blair	2,069	41.68%	445	8.96%	2,450	49.36%	4,964
Bradford	2,314	24.74%	6,938	74.18%	101	1.08%	9,353
Bucks	6,517	54.61%	4,682	39.23%	735	6.16%	11,934
Butler	2,648	43.30%	3,401	55.61%	67	1.10%	6,116
Cambria	2,987	62.77%	804	16.89%	968	20.34%	4,759
Carbon	1,866	61.73%	692	22.89%	465	15.38%	3,023
Centre	2,895	55.28%	390	7.45%	1,952	37.27%	5,237
Chester	6,333	48.38%	5,308	40.55%	1,448	11.06%	13,089
Clarion	2,760	61.36%	788	17.52%	950	21.12%	4,498
Clearfield	1,978	59.94%	718	21.76%	604	18.30%	3,300
Clinton	1,485	53.32%	618	22.19%	682	24.49%	2,785
Columbia	2,889	66.46%	1,239	28.50%	219	5.04%	4,347
Crawford	3,391	38.55%	5,360	60.94%	45	0.51%	8,796
Cumberland	3,427	52.90%	1,472	22.72%	1,579	24.37%	6,478
Dauphin	3,094	43.28%	1,615	22.59%	2,439	34.12%	7,148
Delaware	2,005	43.54%	1,590	34.53%	1,010	21.93%	4,605
Elk	575	63.75%	275	30.49%	52	5.76%	902
Erie	2,584	32.18%	5,156	64.22%	289	3.60%	8,029
Fayette	3,554	52.13%	2,089	30.64%	1,174	17.22%	6,817
Franklin	3,469	48.53%	2,446	34.22%	1,233	17.25%	7,148
Fulton	970	57.81%	142	8.46%	566	33.73%	1,678
Greene	2,747	63.09%	1,321	30.34%	286	6.57%	4,354
Huntingdon	2,164	45.70%	926	19.56%	1,645	34.74%	4,735
Indiana	1,762	31.26%	3,612	64.08%	263	4.67%	5,637
Jefferson	1,463	46.58%	1,063	33.84%	615	19.58%	3,141
Juniata	1,365	52.66%	480	18.52%	747	28.82%	2,592
Lancaster	8,731	43.81%	6,608	33.15%	4,592	23.04%	19,931
Lawrence	1,220	27.85%	3,065	69.96%	96	2.19%	4,381
Lebanon	2,511	46.83%	2,414	45.02%	437	8.15%	5,362
Lehigh	4,426	56.85%	3,237	41.58%	122	1.57%	7,785
Luzerne	6,791	54.29%	4,850	38.77%	868	6.94%	12,509
Lycoming	3,324	55.14%	934	29.36%	1,770	15.49%	6,028
McKean	526	37.98%	812	58.63%	47	3.39%	1,385
Mercer	2,699	41.50%	3,686	56.68%	118	1.81%	6,503
Mifflin	1,491	54.08%	216	7.83%	1,050	38.08%	2,757
Monroe	2,275	78.34%	560	19.28%	69	2.38%	2,904
Montgomery	7,134	58.27%	2,845	23.24%	2,265	18.50%	12,244
Montour	1,271	60.93%	666	31.93%	149	7.14%	2,086
Northampton	5,260	63.63%	1,168	14.13%	1,838	22.24%	8,266
Northumberland	3,059	61.61%	566	11.40%	1,340	26.99%	4,965
Perry	2,135	52.55%	521	12.82%	1,407	34.63%	4,063
Philadelphia	38,222	54.37%	7,993	11.37%	24,084	34.26%	70,299
Pike	862	75.15%	270	23.54%	15	1.31%	1,147
Potter	667	34.43%	1,264	65.26%	6	0.31%	1,937
Schuylkill	7,035	59.09%	2,188	18.38%	2,682	22.53%	11,905
Snyder	1,255	45.44%	443	16.04%	1,064	38.52%	2,762
Somerset	1,763	38.11%	1,458	31.52%	1,405	30.37%	4,626
Sullivan	538	60.11%	309	34.53%	48	5.36%	895
Susquehanna	2,548	39.44%	3,861	59.77%	51	0.79%	6,460
Tioga	1,386	23.28%	4,541	76.27%	27	0.45%	5,954
Union	1,092	40.34%	1,429	52.79%	186	6.87%	2,707
Venango	2,157	50.52%	2,041	47.80%	72	1.69%	4,270
Warren	1,231	36.52%	2,091	62.03%	49	1.45%	3,371
Washington	4,288	48.78%	4,237	48.20%	265	3.01%	8,790
Wayne	2,259	49.71%	2,172	47.80%	113	2.49%	4,544
Westmoreland	5,172	54.09%	4,091	42.78%	299	3.13%	9,562
Wyoming	1,171	49.14%	1,138	47.75%	74	3.11%	2,383
York	6,876	58.83%	511	4.37%	4,301	36.80%	11,688
Totals	230,700	50.11%	147,510	32.04%	82,176	17.85%	460,386

== Analysis ==
Following the election, Pennsylvania would establish itself as a Republican stronghold. This would be the final time that Pennsylvania would vote for a Democratic candidate until Franklin D. Roosevelt won the state in 1936, as well as the last time that the state voted for a non-Republican candidate until Theodore Roosevelt’s third-party bid in 1912. Along with this being the last time that a non-incumbent Democrat won the state until John F. Kennedy in 1960.

As of the 2024 presidential election, this is the only time Snyder County voted for a Democratic presidential candidate. Lebanon County has voted for the Democratic presidential candidate once since, in 1936. Blair, Dauphin, and Philadelphia counties would not vote Democratic again until 1936, and Delaware County until 1964. Lancaster, Huntingdon, and Somerset counties have voted for a Democrat once since, in 1964.

This is the first time Adams County voted for a Democratic party candidate, though it did vote for Andrew Jackson in 1824, who would be the party's first two nominees in 1828 and 1832.

This remains the only presidential election in history in which New York voted Republican while its neighboring state, Pennsylvania, voted Democratic. This is also one of only four occasions where Pennsylvania and Michigan voted for different presidential candidates ever since the Democrats and Republicans became the two major parties in U.S. politics. (Note: The other times were in 1932, 1940, and 1976.)

== See also ==
- United States presidential elections in Pennsylvania
