= 1864 United States presidential election in Pennsylvania =

- November 8, 1864

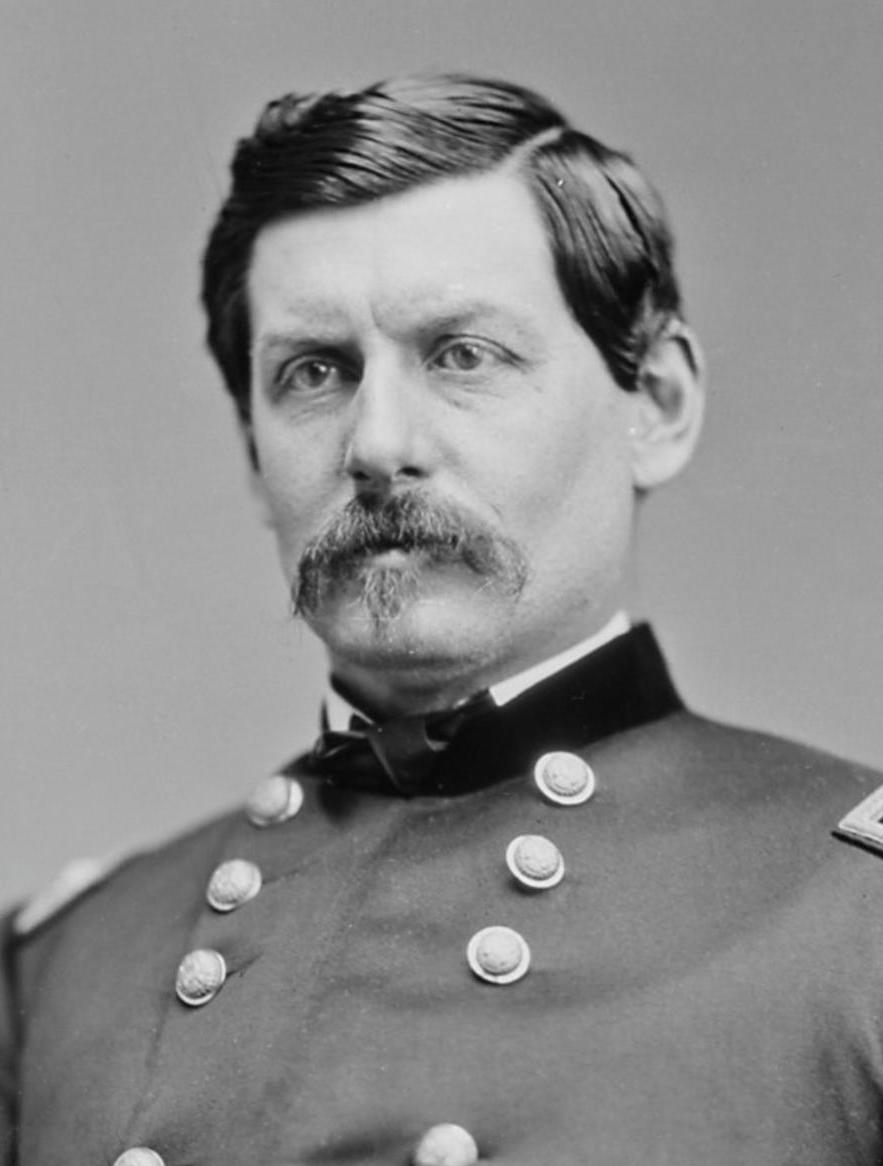
Nominee	Abraham Lincoln	George B. McClellan
Party	National Union	Democratic
Home state	Illinois	New Jersey
Running mate	Andrew Johnson	George H. Pendleton
Electoral vote	26	0
Popular vote	296,391	276,316
Percentage	51.75%	48.25%
County results
Lincoln
50–60%
60–70%
70–80%
McClellan
50–60%
60–70%
70–80%
80–90%
President before election
Abraham Lincoln
Republican
Elected President
Abraham Lincoln
National Union

A presidential election was held in Pennsylvania on November 8, 1864, as part of the 1864 United States presidential election. Voters chose 26 representatives, or electors to the Electoral College, who voted for president and vice president.

Pennsylvania voted for the National Union candidate, incumbent Republican President Abraham Lincoln and his running mate Andrew Johnson. They defeated the Democratic candidate, George B. McClellan and his running mate George H. Pendleton. Lincoln won the state by a narrow margin of 3.5%.

== Results ==
1864 United States presidential election in Pennsylvania
Party	Candidate	Votes	Percentage	Electoral votes
National Union	Abraham Lincoln (incumbent)	296,391	51.75%	26
Democratic	George B. McClellan	276,316	48.25%	0
Totals		572,707	100.0%	26

== See also ==
- United States presidential elections in Pennsylvania
