= 1872 United States presidential election in Pennsylvania =

- November 5, 1872
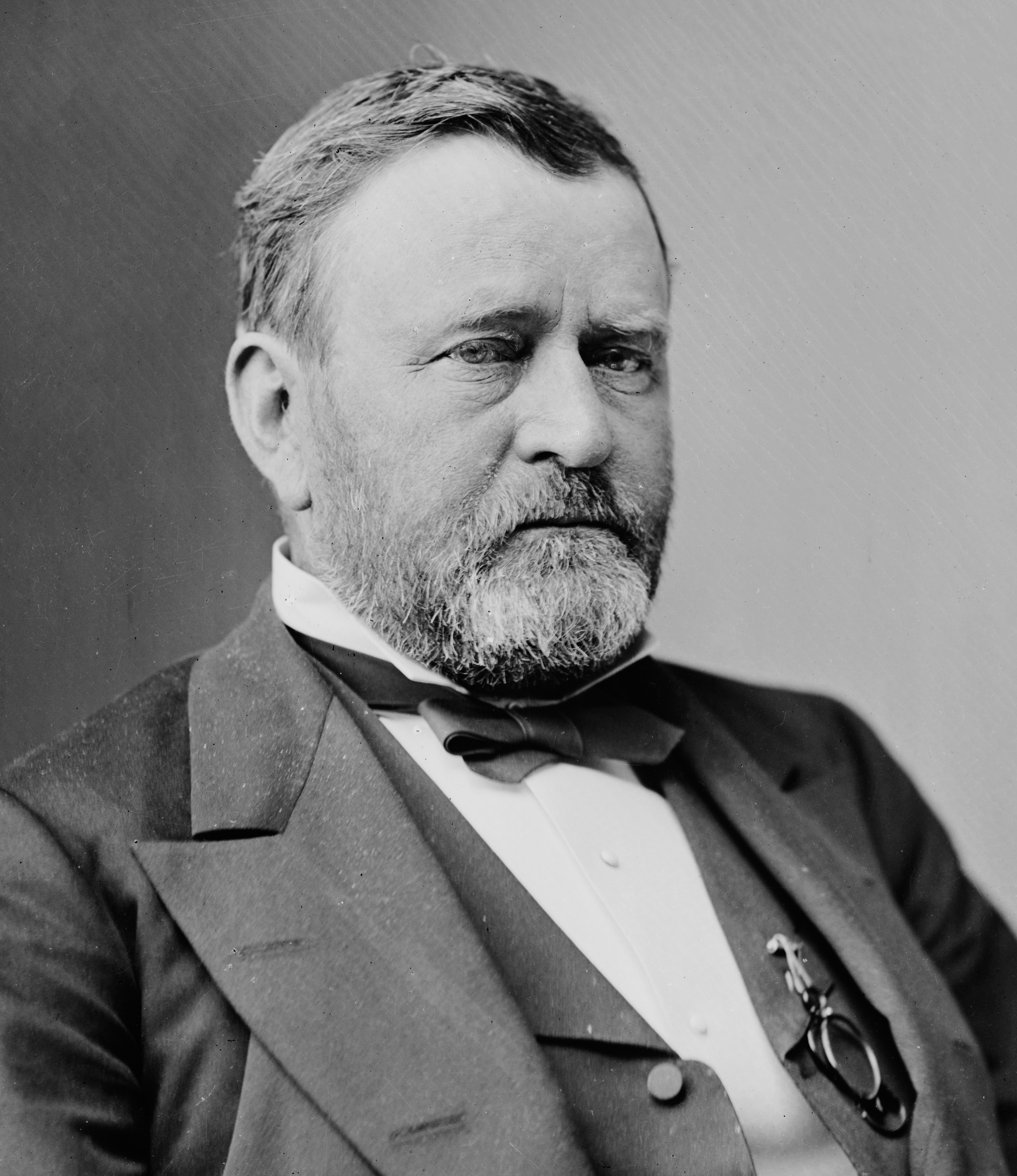

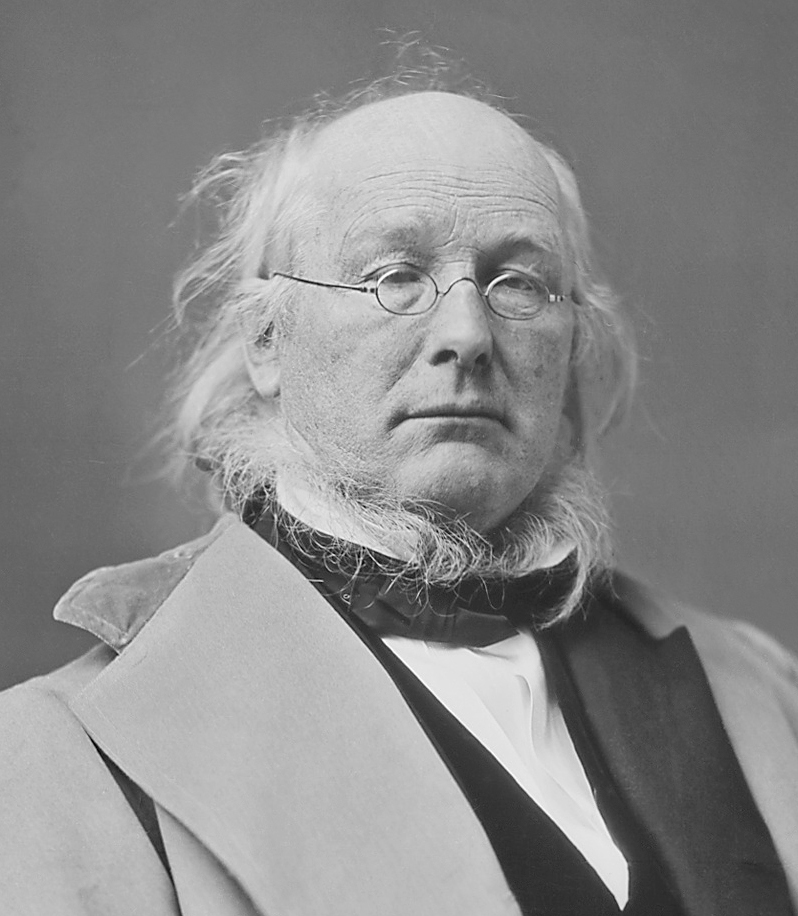
Nominee	Ulysses S. Grant	Horace Greeley
Party	Republican	Liberal Republican
Home state	Illinois	New York
Running mate	Henry Wilson	Benjamin Gratz Brown
Electoral vote	29	0
Popular vote	349,589	212,041
Percentage	62.07%	37.65%
County results
Grant
50–60%
60–70%
70–80%
Greeley
50–60%
60–70%
70–80%
President before election
Ulysses S. Grant
Republican
Elected President
Ulysses S. Grant
Republican

A presidential election was held in Pennsylvania on November 5, 1872, as part of the 1872 United States presidential election. Voters chose 29 representatives, or electors to the Electoral College, who voted for president and vice president.

Pennsylvania voted for the Republican candidate, Ulysses S. Grant, over the Liberal Republican candidate, Horace Greeley. Grant won Pennsylvania by a margin of 24.42%.

== Results ==
1872 United States presidential election in Pennsylvania
Party	Candidate	Votes	Percentage	Electoral votes
Republican	Ulysses S. Grant (incumbent)	349,589	62.07%	29
Liberal Republican	Horace Greeley	212,041	37.65%	0
Prohibition	James Black	1,632	0.29%	0
Totals		563,262	100.0%	29

== See also ==
- United States presidential elections in Pennsylvania
