= 1944 United States presidential election in Pennsylvania =

- November 7, 1944

Nominee	Franklin D. Roosevelt	Thomas E. Dewey
Party	Democratic	Republican
Home state	New York	New York
Running mate	Harry S. Truman	John W. Bricker
Electoral vote	35	0
Popular vote	1,940,479	1,835,054
Percentage	51.14%	48.36%
County results
Roosevelt
50–60%
60–70%
Dewey
50–60%
60–70%
70–80%
President before election
Franklin D. Roosevelt
Democratic
Elected President
Franklin D. Roosevelt
Democratic

The 1944 United States presidential election in Pennsylvania took place on November 7, 1944, as part of the 1944 United States presidential election. Voters chose 35 representatives, or electors to the Electoral College, who voted for president and vice president.

Pennsylvania voted to give Democratic nominee, President Franklin D. Roosevelt a record fourth term, over the Republican nominee, New York Governor Thomas E. Dewey. Roosevelt won Pennsylvania by a slim margin of 2.78%.

== Results ==
1944 United States presidential election in Pennsylvania
Party	Candidate	Votes	Percentage	Electoral votes
Democratic	Franklin D. Roosevelt (incumbent)	1,940,479	51.14%	35
Republican	Thomas E. Dewey	1,835,054	48.36%	0
Socialist	Norman Thomas	11,721	0.31%	0
Prohibition	Claude Watson	5,750	0.15%	0
Industrial Government	Edward Teichert	1,789	0.05%	0
Totals		3,794,793	100.00%	35

=== Results by county ===
County	Franklin Delano Roosevelt Democratic		Thomas Edmund Dewey Republican		Various candidates Other parties		Margin		Total votes cast
County	#	%	#	%	#	%	#	%	Total votes cast
Adams	5,881	39.91%	8,787	59.63%	67	0.45%	-2,906	-19.72%	14,735
Allegheny	350,690	57.09%	261,218	42.52%	2,393	0.39%	89,472	14.56%	614,301
Armstrong	10,202	42.54%	13,656	56.94%	126	0.53%	-3,454	-14.40%	23,984
Beaver	32,743	57.79%	23,555	41.57%	360	0.64%	9,188	16.22%	56,658
Bedford	5,175	37.11%	8,703	62.40%	68	0.49%	-3,528	-25.30%	13,946
Berks	43,889	53.91%	35,274	43.33%	2,247	2.76%	8,615	10.58%	81,410
Blair	18,003	41.76%	24,925	57.82%	178	0.41%	-6,922	-16.06%	43,106
Bradford	5,523	28.86%	13,472	70.40%	142	0.74%	-7,949	-41.54%	19,137
Bucks	17,823	40.76%	25,634	58.62%	270	0.62%	-7,811	-17.86%	43,727
Butler	12,377	38.75%	19,341	60.55%	226	0.71%	-6,964	-21.80%	31,944
Cambria	39,676	58.22%	28,203	41.39%	264	0.39%	11,473	16.84%	68,143
Cameron	1,115	39.08%	1,729	60.60%	9	0.32%	-614	-21.52%	2,853
Carbon	11,060	52.74%	9,837	46.91%	73	0.35%	1,223	5.83%	20,970
Centre	8,064	44.21%	10,048	55.08%	130	0.71%	-1,984	-10.88%	18,242
Chester	18,548	40.84%	26,655	58.70%	208	0.46%	-8,107	-17.85%	45,411
Clarion	5,263	39.10%	8,098	60.16%	99	0.74%	-2,835	-21.06%	13,460
Clearfield	13,617	48.92%	13,986	50.24%	233	0.84%	-369	-1.33%	27,836
Clinton	5,703	48.85%	5,915	50.66%	57	0.49%	-212	-1.82%	11,675
Columbia	9,647	50.63%	9,336	49.00%	70	0.37%	311	1.63%	19,053
Crawford	9,216	37.48%	15,205	61.83%	170	0.69%	-5,989	-24.35%	24,591
Cumberland	12,068	40.25%	17,782	59.30%	134	0.45%	-5,714	-19.06%	29,984
Dauphin	30,684	40.51%	44,725	59.05%	333	0.44%	-14,041	-18.54%	75,742
Delaware	64,021	44.67%	78,533	54.80%	755	0.53%	-14,512	-10.13%	143,309
Elk	6,097	51.63%	5,645	47.80%	67	0.57%	452	3.83%	11,809
Erie	32,912	47.99%	35,247	51.40%	419	0.61%	-2,335	-3.40%	68,578
Fayette	35,093	61.04%	21,945	38.17%	451	0.78%	13,148	22.87%	57,489
Forest	673	33.02%	1,344	65.95%	21	1.03%	-671	-32.92%	2,038
Franklin	8,807	39.58%	13,380	60.13%	63	0.28%	-4,573	-20.55%	22,250
Fulton	1,758	45.58%	2,084	54.03%	15	0.39%	-326	-8.45%	3,857
Greene	8,392	59.13%	5,747	40.49%	53	0.37%	2,645	18.64%	14,192
Huntingdon	4,131	33.53%	8,106	65.80%	83	0.67%	-3,975	-32.26%	12,320
Indiana	8,863	37.83%	14,388	61.42%	175	0.75%	-5,525	-23.58%	23,426
Jefferson	6,425	36.62%	10,970	62.52%	152	0.87%	-4,545	-25.90%	17,547
Juniata	2,666	43.05%	3,512	56.71%	15	0.24%	-846	-13.66%	6,193
Lackawanna	59,190	55.54%	47,261	44.34%	127	0.12%	11,929	11.19%	106,578
Lancaster	27,353	37.64%	44,888	61.77%	432	0.59%	-17,535	-24.13%	72,673
Lawrence	17,331	47.33%	18,886	51.57%	403	1.10%	-1,555	-4.25%	36,620
Lebanon	11,818	43.52%	15,206	56.00%	129	0.48%	-3,388	-12.48%	27,153
Lehigh	29,134	47.73%	31,584	51.75%	315	0.52%	-2,450	-4.01%	61,033
Luzerne	73,674	51.81%	67,984	47.81%	541	0.38%	5,690	4.00%	142,199
Lycoming	15,658	43.81%	19,886	55.64%	197	0.55%	-4,228	-11.83%	35,741
McKean	6,492	34.90%	11,988	64.45%	121	0.65%	-5,496	-29.55%	18,601
Mercer	16,589	45.57%	19,606	53.85%	212	0.58%	-3,017	-8.29%	36,407
Mifflin	5,693	47.63%	6,205	51.92%	54	0.45%	-512	-4.28%	11,952
Monroe	5,490	46.81%	6,202	52.88%	37	0.32%	-712	-6.07%	11,729
Montgomery	47,815	37.70%	78,260	61.71%	752	0.59%	-30,445	-24.01%	126,827
Montour	2,212	44.71%	2,727	55.12%	8	0.16%	-515	-10.41%	4,947
Northampton	32,584	54.75%	26,643	44.76%	292	0.49%	5,941	9.98%	59,519
Northumberland	20,333	47.90%	21,995	51.81%	122	0.29%	-1,662	-3.92%	42,450
Perry	3,265	36.16%	5,722	63.37%	43	0.48%	-2,457	-27.21%	9,030
Philadelphia	496,367	58.70%	346,380	40.96%	2,883	0.34%	149,987	17.74%	845,630
Pike	1,408	34.33%	2,674	65.20%	19	0.46%	-1,266	-30.87%	4,101
Potter	1,894	29.58%	4,474	69.86%	36	0.56%	-2,580	-40.29%	6,404
Schuylkill	35,852	46.72%	40,671	53.00%	221	0.29%	-4,819	-6.28%	76,744
Snyder	1,795	23.89%	5,696	75.81%	23	0.31%	-3,901	-51.92%	7,514
Somerset	10,287	38.96%	16,039	60.74%	79	0.30%	-5,752	-21.78%	26,405
Sullivan	1,329	41.60%	1,858	58.15%	8	0.25%	-529	-16.56%	3,195
Susquehanna	4,212	32.20%	8,819	67.42%	49	0.37%	-4,607	-35.22%	13,080
Tioga	3,248	23.69%	10,381	75.73%	79	0.58%	-7,133	-52.04%	13,708
Union	1,704	23.25%	5,585	76.19%	41	0.56%	-3,881	-52.95%	7,330
Venango	6,426	29.69%	14,916	68.91%	304	1.40%	-8,490	-39.22%	21,646
Warren	4,440	32.05%	9,276	66.96%	137	0.99%	-4,836	-34.91%	13,853
Washington	46,023	62.17%	27,615	37.30%	392	0.53%	18,408	24.87%	74,030
Wayne	2,793	25.22%	8,242	74.43%	39	0.35%	-5,449	-49.21%	11,074
Westmoreland	61,057	58.17%	43,202	41.16%	705	0.67%	17,855	17.01%	104,964
Wyoming	1,982	30.11%	4,581	69.60%	19	0.29%	-2,599	-39.49%	6,582
York	38,226	53.72%	32,617	45.84%	315	0.44%	5,609	7.88%	71,158
Totals	1,940,479	51.14%	1,835,054	48.36%	19,260	0.51%	105,425	2.78%	3,794,793

==== Counties that flipped from Democratic to Republican ====
- Clearfield
- Clinton
- Cumberland
- Juniata
- Lehigh
- Mifflin
- Monroe
- Montour
- Northumberland
- Schuylkill

==== Counties that flipped from Republican to Democratic ====
- Elk

== See also ==
- United States presidential elections in Pennsylvania
