= 1848 United States presidential election in Pennsylvania =

- November 7, 1848
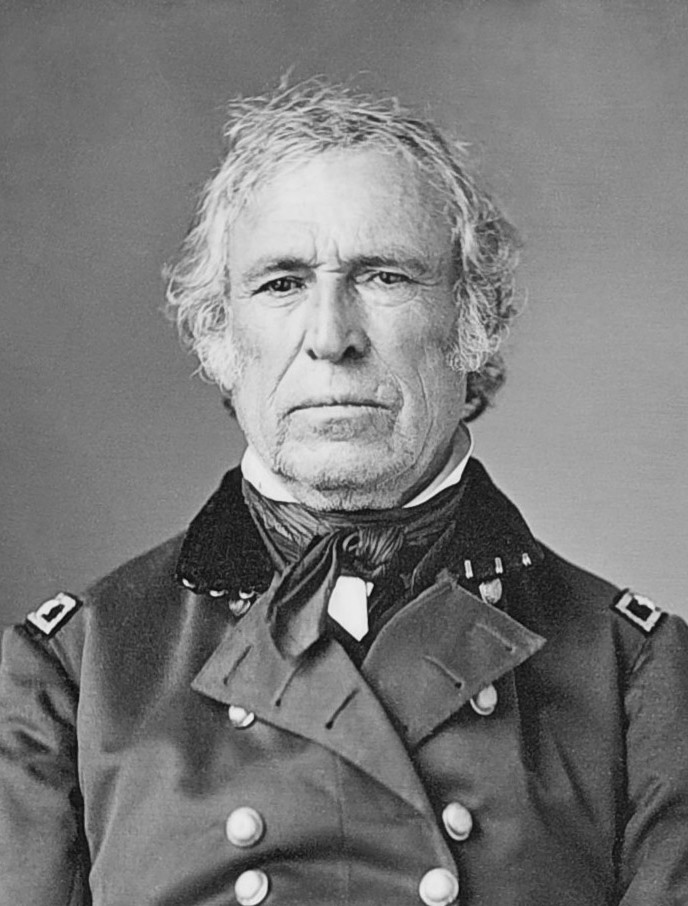

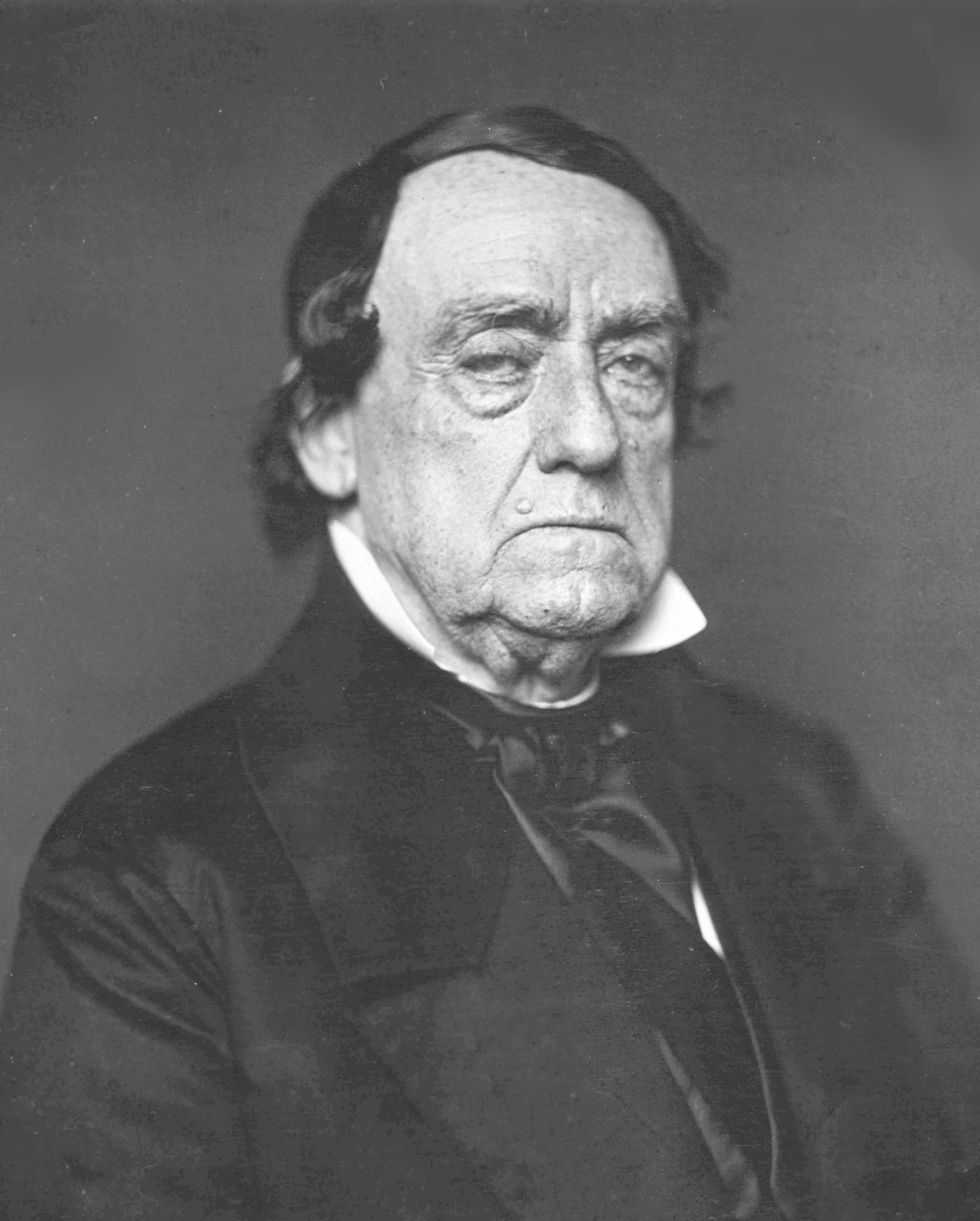
| Nominee | Zachary Taylor | Lewis Cass |
| Party | Whig | Democratic |
| Home state | Louisiana | Michigan |
| Running mate | Millard Fillmore | William O. Butler |
| Electoral vote | 26 | 0 |
| Popular vote | 185,313 | 171,976 |
| Percentage | 50.28% | 46.66% |
County results
Taylor
30–40%
40–50%
50–60%
60–70%
70–80%
Cass
40–50%
50–60%
60–70%
70–80%
President before election
James K. Polk
Democratic
Elected President
Zachary Taylor
Whig

A presidential election was held in Pennsylvania on November 7, 1848, as part of the 1848 United States presidential election. Voters chose 26 representatives, or electors to the Electoral College, who voted for President and Vice President.

Pennsylvania voted for the Whig candidate, Zachary Taylor, over the Democratic candidate, Lewis Cass. Taylor won Pennsylvania by a margin of 3.62%. Pennsylvania proved to be decisive as Cass would have won the Electoral College if he had carried the state.

== Results ==
1848 United States presidential election in Pennsylvania
| Party | Candidate | Votes | Percentage | Electoral votes |
|---|---|---|---|---|
| Whig | Zachary Taylor | 185,313 | 50.28% | 26 |
| Democratic | Lewis Cass | 171,976 | 46.66% | 0 |
| Free Soil | Martin Van Buren | 11,263 | 3.06% | 0 |
| Totals | | 368,552 | 100.0% | 26 |

=== Results by county ===
| County | Zachary Taylor Whig | | Lewis Cass Democratic | | Martin Van Buren Free Soil | | Margin | | Total votes cast |
| County | # | % | # | % | # | % | # | % | Total votes cast |
|---|---|---|---|---|---|---|---|---|---|
| Adams | 2,576 | 59.04% | 1,762 | 40.39% | 25 | 0.57% | 814 | 18.65% | 4,363 |
| Allegheny | 10,112 | 57.84% | 6,591 | 37.70% | 779 | 4.46% | 3,521 | 20.14% | 17,482 |
| Armstrong | 2,030 | 47.24% | 2,126 | 49.48% | 141 | 3.28% | -96 | -2.24% | 4,297 |
| Beaver | 2,655 | 48.38% | 2,303 | 41.96% | 530 | 9.66% | 352 | 6.42% | 5,488 |
| Bedford | 2,836 | 50.17% | 2,816 | 49.81% | 1 | 0.02% | 20 | 0.36% | 5,653 |
| Berks | 5,082 | 34.77% | 9,484 | 64.88% | 51 | 0.35% | -4,402 | -30.11% | 14,617 |
| Blair | 2,476 | 63.24% | 1,435 | 36.65% | 4 | 0.10% | 1,041 | 26.59% | 3,915 |
| Bradford | 3,272 | 47.15% | 1,889 | 27.22% | 1,779 | 25.63% | 1,383 | 19.93% | 6,940 |
| Bucks | 5,140 | 48.19% | 5,364 | 50.29% | 163 | 1.53% | -224 | -2.10% | 10,667 |
| Butler | 2,505 | 50.86% | 2,247 | 45.62% | 173 | 3.51% | 258 | 5.24% | 4,925 |
| Cambria | 1,233 | 46.86% | 1,386 | 52.68% | 12 | 0.46% | -153 | -5.82% | 2,631 |
| Carbon | 839 | 41.51% | 1,181 | 58.44% | 1 | 0.05% | -342 | -16.93% | 2,021 |
| Centre | 1,856 | 41.51% | 2,611 | 58.40% | 4 | 0.09% | -755 | -16.89% | 4,471 |
| Chester | 5,949 | 50.30% | 5,370 | 45.41% | 507 | 4.29% | 579 | 4.89% | 11,826 |
| Clarion | 1,372 | 36.95% | 2,306 | 62.11% | 35 | 0.94% | -934 | -25.16% | 3,713 |
| Clearfield | 761 | 38.99% | 1,168 | 59.84% | 23 | 1.18% | -407 | -20.85% | 1,952 |
| Clinton | 911 | 48.48% | 967 | 51.46% | 1 | 0.05% | -56 | -2.98% | 1,879 |
| Columbia | 2,263 | 39.79% | 3,396 | 59.70% | 29 | 0.51% | -1,133 | -19.91% | 5,688 |
| Crawford | 2,204 | 39.53% | 2,748 | 49.28% | 624 | 11.19% | -544 | -9.75% | 5,576 |
| Cumberland | 3,242 | 50.30% | 3,178 | 49.31% | 25 | 0.39% | 64 | 0.99% | 6,445 |
| Dauphin | 3,705 | 61.85% | 2,251 | 37.58% | 34 | 0.57% | 1,454 | 24.27% | 5,990 |
| Delaware | 2,194 | 57.36% | 1,547 | 40.44% | 84 | 2.20% | 647 | 16.92% | 3,825 |
| Elk | 134 | 34.18% | 242 | 61.73% | 16 | 4.08% | -108 | -27.55% | 392 |
| Erie | 3,418 | 58.97% | 2,022 | 34.89% | 356 | 6.14% | 1,396 | 24.08% | 5,796 |
| Fayette | 3,045 | 46.42% | 3,441 | 52.46% | 73 | 1.11% | -396 | -6.04% | 6,559 |
| Franklin | 4,006 | 55.57% | 3,199 | 44.38% | 4 | 0.06% | 807 | 11.17% | 7,209 |
| Greene | 1,476 | 37.78% | 2,379 | 60.89% | 52 | 1.33% | -903 | -23.11% | 3,907 |
| Huntingdon | 2,590 | 57.09% | 1,922 | 42.36% | 25 | 0.55% | 668 | 14.73% | 4,537 |
| Indiana | 2,410 | 57.96% | 1,544 | 37.13% | 204 | 4.91% | 866 | 20.83% | 4,158 |
| Jefferson | 887 | 47.23% | 972 | 51.76% | 19 | 1.01% | -85 | -4.52% | 1,878 |
| Juniata | 850 | 49.79% | 856 | 50.15% | 1 | 0.06% | -6 | -0.36% | 1,707 |
| Lancaster | 11,390 | 64.59% | 6,080 | 34.48% | 163 | 0.92% | 5,310 | 30.11% | 17,633 |
| Lebanon | 2,996 | 61.65% | 1,862 | 38.31% | 2 | 0.04% | 1,134 | 23.34 | 4,860 |
| Lehigh | 2,978 | 48.19% | 3,199 | 51.76% | 3 | 0.05% | -221 | -3.57% | 6,180 |
| Luzerne | 3,516 | 45.76% | 3,991 | 51.95% | 176 | 2.29% | -475 | -5.19% | 7,683 |
| Lycoming | 2,036 | 47.47% | 2,244 | 52.32% | 9 | 0.21% | -208 | -4.85% | 4,289 |
| McKean | 367 | 45.48% | 418 | 51.80% | 22 | 2.73% | -51 | -6.32% | 807 |
| Mercer | 2,977 | 41.63% | 3,094 | 43.27% | 1,080 | 15.10% | -117 | -1.64% | 7,151 |
| Mifflin | 1,548 | 48.99% | 1,586 | 50.19% | 26 | 0.82% | -38 | -1.20% | 3,160 |
| Monroe | 518 | 22.03% | 1,830 | 77.84% | 3 | 0.13% | -1,312 | -55.81% | 2,351 |
| Montgomery | 5,040 | 46.16% | 5,627 | 51.54% | 3 | 0.13% | -587 | -5.38% | 10,918 |
| Northampton | 3,191 | 42.94% | 4,203 | 56.55% | 38 | 0.51% | -1,012 | -13.61% | 7,432 |
| Northumberland | 1,765 | 43.79% | 2,258 | 56.02% | 8 | 0.20% | -493 | -12.23% | 4,031 |
| Perry | 1,562 | 40.45% | 2,295 | 59.43% | 5 | 0.13% | -733 | -6.94% | 3,862 |
| Philadelphia (City) | 10,656 | 65.65% | 5,266 | 32.44% | 309 | 1.90% | 5,390 | 33.21% | 16,231 |
| Philadelphia (County) | 20,574 | 55.03% | 16,242 | 43.45% | 568 | 1.52% | 4,332 | 11.58% | 37,384 |
| Pike | 216 | 21.22% | 799 | 78.49% | 3 | 0.29% | -583 | -57.27% | 1,018 |
| Potter | 226 | 23.99% | 468 | 49.68% | 248 | 26.33% | -220 (Note: Margin in votes is between Cass and Van Buren) | -23.35% (Note: Margin in percentage is between Cass and Van Buren) | 942 |
| Schuylkill | 4,939 | 56.94% | 3,700 | 42.66% | 35 | 0.40% | 1,239 | 14.28% | 8,674 |
| Somerset | 3,018 | 72.44% | 1,127 | 27.05% | 21 | 0.50% | 1,891 | 45.39% | 4,166 |
| Sullivan | 129 | 28.60% | 303 | 67.18% | 19 | 4.21% | -174 | -38.58% | 451 |
| Susquehanna | 1,853 | 39.28% | 2,563 | 54.34% | 301 | 6.38% | -710 | -15.06% | 4,717 |
| Tioga | 1,350 | 37.02% | 1,344 | 36.85% | 953 | 26.13% | 6 | 0.17% | 3,647 |
| Union | 3,129 | 65.05% | 1,656 | 34.43% | 25 | 0.52% | 1,473 | 30.62% | 4,810 |
| Venango | 1,061 | 38.40% | 1,538 | 55.66% | 164 | 5.94% | -477 | -17.26% | 2,763 |
| Warren | 948 | 43.65% | 1,088 | 50.09% | 136 | 6.26% | -140 | -6.44% | 2,172 |
| Washington | 3,898 | 47.62% | 3,820 | 46.67% | 468 | 5.72% | 78 | 0.95% | 8,186 |
| Wayne | 997 | 35.09% | 1,642 | 57.80% | 202 | 7.11% | -645 | -22.71% | 2,841 |
| Westmoreland | 3,124 | 37.00% | 5,197 | 61.55% | 122 | 1.44% | -2,073 | -24.55% | 8,443 |
| Wyoming | 861 | 48.10% | 892 | 49.83% | 37 | 2.07% | -31 | -1.73% | 1,790 |
| York | 4,838 | 48.41% | 5,151 | 51.55% | 4 | 0.04% | -313 | -3.14% | 9,993 |
| Totals | 185,730 | 50.32% | 172,186 | 46.65% | 11,176 | 3.03% | 13,544 | 3.67% | 369,092 |

== See also ==
- United States presidential elections in Pennsylvania
