= 1828 United States presidential election in Pennsylvania =

- October 31 – December 2, 1828

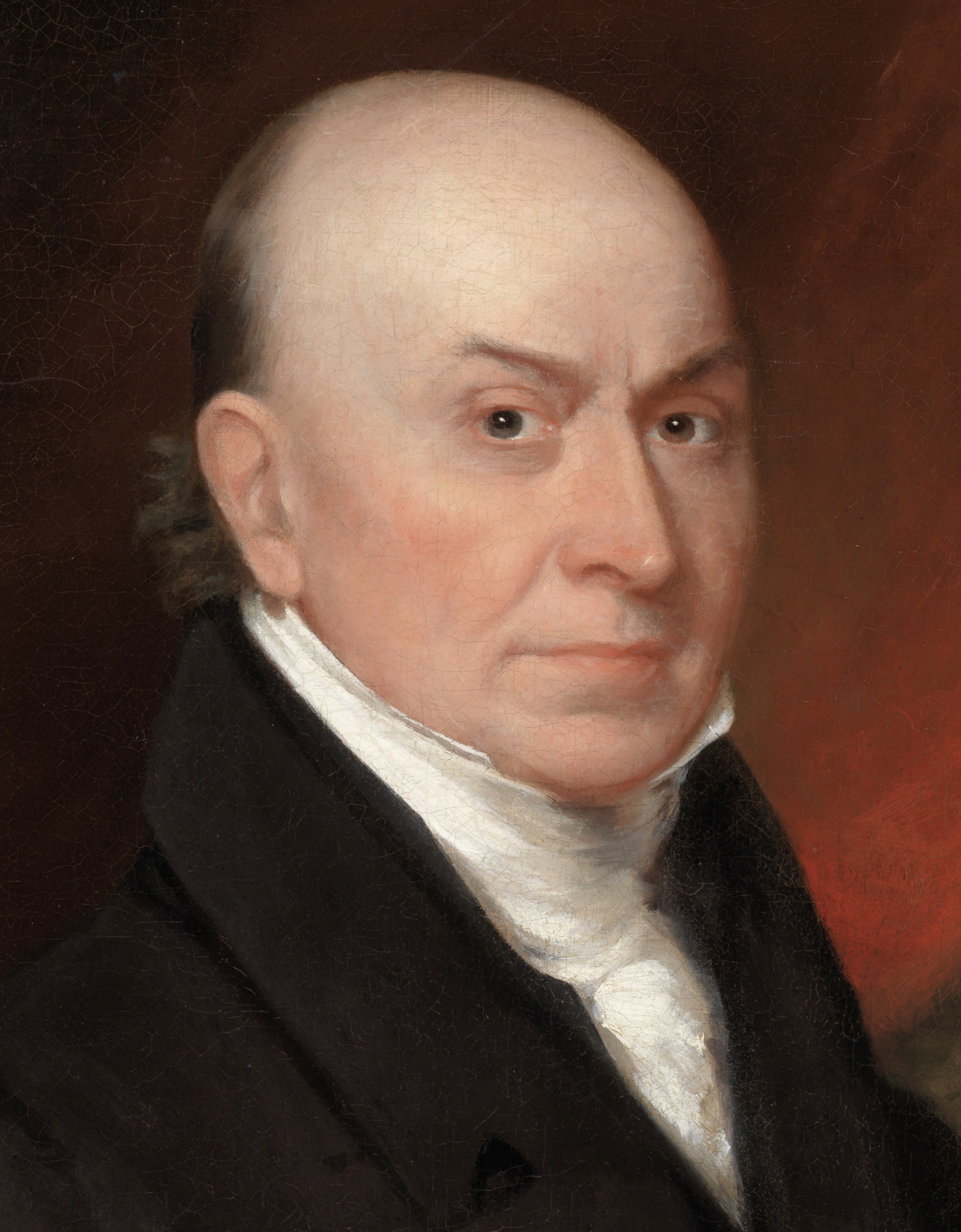
Nominee	Andrew Jackson	John Quincy Adams
Party	Democratic	National Republican
Home state	Tennessee	Massachusetts
Running mate	John C. Calhoun	Richard Rush
Electoral vote	28	0
Popular vote	101,652	50,848
Percentage	66.66%	33.34%
County results
Jackson
50–60%
60–70%
70–80%
80–90%
Adams
50–60%
President before election
John Quincy Adams
Democratic-Republican
Elected President
Andrew Jackson
Democratic

A presidential election was held in Pennsylvania between October 31 and December 2, 1828, as part of the 1828 United States presidential election. Voters chose 28 representatives, or electors to the Electoral College, who voted for President and Vice President.

Pennsylvania voted for the Democratic candidate, Andrew Jackson, over the National Republican candidate, John Quincy Adams. Jackson won Pennsylvania by a margin of 33.32%.

To date, this is still the best Democratic Party performance in Pennsylvania in any federal election.

== Results ==
1828 United States presidential election in Pennsylvania
Party	Candidate	Votes	Percentage	Electoral votes
Democratic	Andrew Jackson	101,652	66.66%	28
National Republican	John Quincy Adams (incumbent)	50,848	33.34%	0
Totals		152,500	100.0%	28

== See also ==
- United States presidential elections in Pennsylvania
