= 1804 United States presidential election in Pennsylvania =

- November 2, 1804
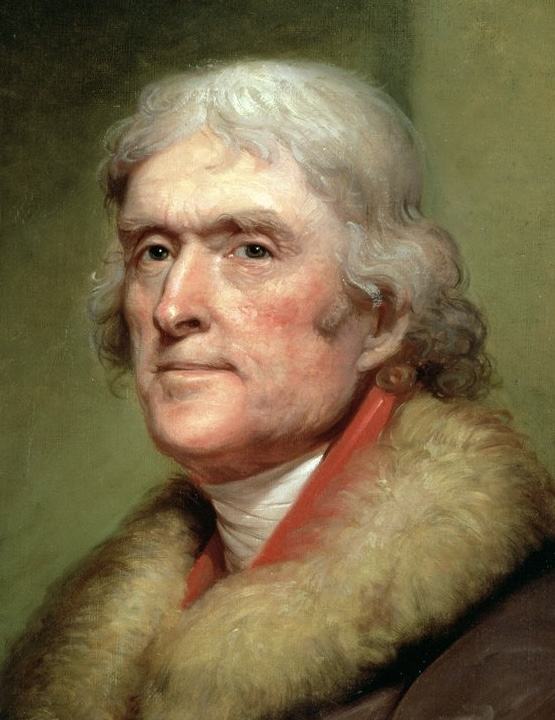

Nominee	Thomas Jefferson	Unpledged electors
Party	Democratic-Republican	Federalist
Home state	Virginia	N/A
Running mate	George Clinton	N/A
Electoral vote	20	0
Popular vote	22,081	1,239
Percentage	94.7%	5.3%
County results
Jefferson
70–80%
80–90%
90–100%
Federalist electors
50–60%
President before election
Thomas Jefferson
Democratic-Republican
Elected President
Thomas Jefferson
Democratic-Republican

A presidential election was held in Pennsylvania on November 2, 1804, as part of the 1804 United States presidential election. The Democratic-Republican Party's ticket of incumbent president Thomas Jefferson and former New York governor George Clinton defeated the Federalist Party's ticket.

The Democratic-Republican members of the Pennsylvania General Assembly held a caucus on March 22 and nominated electors pledged to Jefferson and Clinton. The Federalists were disorganized and pessimistic about their ability to carry the state. A gathering of Federalists met in Gettysburg, Pennsylvania, on October 25 and belatedly nominated electors; although a clandestine meeting of Congressional Federalists had nominated Charles Cotesworth Pinckney for president in February, the Federalist ticket was formally unpledged. Predictions that the Federalists would seek to exploit factionalism within the Pennsylvania Democratic-Republican Party proved unfounded, for Jefferson carried all but one of the state's 32 counties with nearly 95 percent of the votes.

== General election ==
=== Summary ===
Pennsylvania chose 20 electors on a statewide general ticket. Nineteenth-century election laws required voters to elect the members of the Electoral College individually, rather than as a block. This sometimes resulted in small differences in the number of votes cast for electors pledged to the same presidential nominee, if some voters did not vote for all the electors nominated by a party. The following table compares the votes for the leading Democratic-Republican and Federalist electors to give an approximate sense of the statewide popular vote.

1804 United States presidential election in Pennsylvania
Party	Candidate	Votes	%
Democratic-Republican	Thomas Jefferson George Clinton	22,081	94.69
Federalist	Unpledged electors	1,239	5.31
Total votes		23,320	100.00

=== Electors ===
Complete returns from all but a few counties have been lost. The results published in the Lancaster Intelligencer and the Philadelphia Aurora compare the votes for the leading electors in each county. Twenty electors were named on each ticket, in addition to write-in candidates who received scattering votes in a few counties; two Federalist tickets received votes in Northampton County, Pennsylvania, including the ticket nominated by the Federalist convention and an alternate ticket with only 15 electors. All 20 electors on the Democratic-Republican ticket were elected.

Thomas Jefferson and George Clinton Democratic-Republican Party	Unpledged electors Federalist Party	Unpledged electors Federalist Party (Northampton County)
Charles Thomson; William Montgomery; Matthew Lawler; Robert MacMullin; William Brooke; Thomas Long; Francis Swaine; Henry Speering; James Boyd; Peter Frailey; Casper Shaffner, Jr.; John Bowman; William Brown; George Smith; Jacob Hostetter; Jacob Bonnet; James Montgomery; John Minor; John Hamilton; Nathaniel Irish	George Latimer; Francis Johnston; Jonas Preston; Cadwalader Evans; John Franklin; Isaac Wayne; John Miller; Marks John Biddle; Alexander Graydon; John Chapman; David Watts; John Blair; Charles Hall; Jacob Hay; William MacPherson; John King; William Guthrie; Ephraim Douglas; John Hoge; Alexander Addison	George Latimer; Cadwalader Evans; John Franklin; Marks John Biddle; Alexander Addison; J. Arndt; Thomas B. Dick; Andrew Ellicott; Joseph Erwin; Joseph Hopkinson; Benjamin R. Morgan; Samuel Preston; James Ross; Samuel Sitgreaves; Jacob Slough

=== Results by county ===
1804 United States presidential election in Pennsylvania by county
County	Thomas Jefferson Democratic-Republican		Unpledged electors Federalist		Margin		Total
County	Votes	%	Votes	%	Votes	%	Total
Adams	208	45.41	250	54.59	-42	-9.17	458
Allegheny	526	100.00	—		526	100.00	526
Beaver	202	100.00	—		202	100.00	202
Bedford	174	90.62	18	9.38	156	81.25	192
Berks	2,779	97.20	80	2.80	2,699	94.40	2,859
Bucks	1,129	96.41	42	3.59	1,087	92.83	1,171
Butler	86	100.00	—		86	100.00	86
Centre	378	93.10	28	6.90	350	86.21	406
Chester	1,402	94.73	78	5.27	1,324	89.46	1,480
Crawford	208	100.00	—		208	100.00	208
Cumberland	668	88.71	85	11.29	583	77.42	753
Dauphin	569	95.95	24	4.05	545	91.90	593
Delaware	244	85.31	42	14.69	202	70.63	286
Erie	112	100.00	—		112	100.00	112
Fayette	173	100.00	—		173	100.00	173
Franklin	509	72.10	197	27.90	312	44.19	706
Greene	105	84.00	20	16.00	85	68.00	125
Huntingdon	409	71.75	161	28.25	248	43.51	570
Lancaster	1,262	97.53	32	2.47	1,230	95.05	1,294
Luzerne	276	97.18	8	2.82	268	94.37	284
Lycoming	259	100.00	—		259	100.00	259
Mercer	74	100.00	—		74	100.00	74
Mifflin	429	92.06	37	7.94	392	84.12	466
Montgomery	1,197	100.00	—		1,197	100.00	1,197
Northampton	1,670	98.18	31	1.82	1,639	96.36	1,701
Northumberland	1,138	99.56	5	0.44	1,133	99.12	1,143
Philadelphia	3,333	99.97	1	0.03	3,332	99.94	3,334
Somerset	247	88.21	33	11.79	214	76.43	280
Washington	881	100.00	—		881	100.00	881
Wayne	18	100.00	—		18	100.00	18
Westmoreland	474	98.54	7	1.46	467	97.09	481
York	942	94.01	60	5.99	882	88.02	1,002
TOTAL	22,081	94.69	1,239	5.31	20,842	89.37	23,320

== See also ==
- United States presidential elections in Pennsylvania

== Bibliography ==
- Higginbotham, Sanford W. (1952). The Keystone in the Democratic Arch: Pennsylvania Politics, 1800–1816. Harrisburg: Pennsylvania Historical and Museum Commission.
- Lampi, Philip J. (n.d.). "Electoral College". A New Nation Votes. American Antiquarian Society.
- Lampi, Philip J. (2012). "Pennsylvania 1804 Electoral College". A New Nation Votes. American Antiquarian Society.
