= 1876 United States presidential election in Pennsylvania =

- November 7, 1876
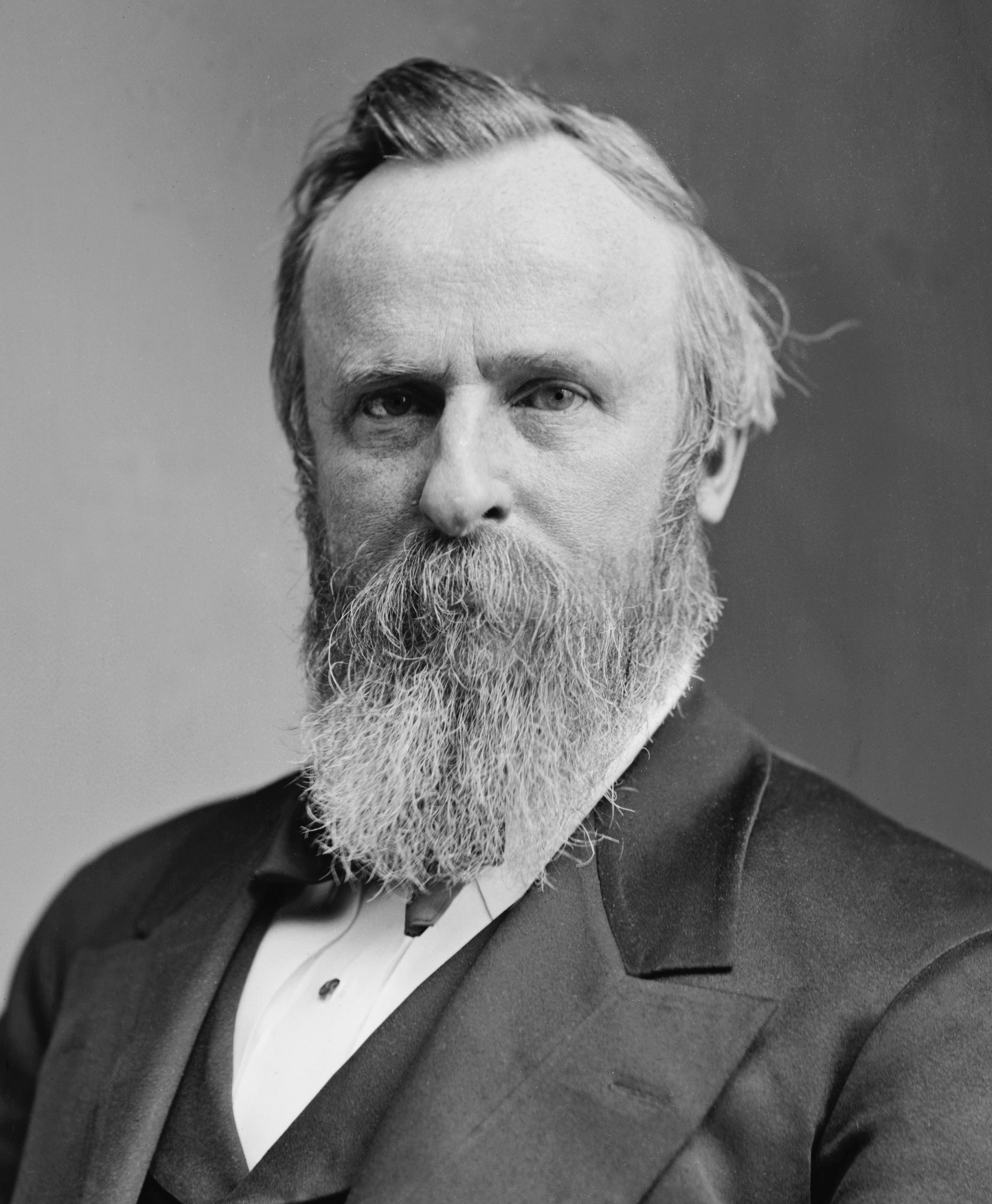

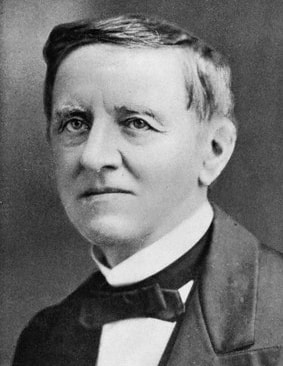
Nominee	Rutherford B. Hayes	Samuel J. Tilden
Party	Republican	Democratic
Home state	Ohio	New York
Running mate	William A. Wheeler	Thomas A. Hendricks
Electoral vote	29	0
Popular vote	384,184	366,204
Percentage	50.62%	48.25%
County results
Hayes
50–60%
60–70%
Tilden
50–60%
60–70%
70–80%
80–90%
President before election
Ulysses S. Grant
Republican
Elected President
Rutherford B. Hayes
Republican

A presidential election was held in Pennsylvania on November 7, 1876, as part of the 1876 United States presidential election. Voters chose 29 representatives, or electors to the Electoral College, who voted for president and vice president.

Pennsylvania voted for the Republican nominee, Rutherford B. Hayes, over the Democratic nominee, Samuel J. Tilden. Hayes won Pennsylvania by a narrow margin of 2.37%. Jefferson County has voted Democratic only once since, in 1964.

== Results ==
1876 United States presidential election in Pennsylvania
Party	Candidate	Votes	Percentage	Electoral votes
Republican	Rutherford B. Hayes	384,184	50.62%	29
Democratic	Samuel J. Tilden	366,204	48.25%	0
Greenback	Peter Cooper	7,204	0.95%	0
Temperance	Green Clay Smith	1,318	0.17%	0
Anti-Masonic	James Walker	83	0.01%	0
Totals		758,993	100.0%	29

== See also ==
- United States presidential elections in Pennsylvania
