= 1840 United States presidential election in Pennsylvania =

- October 30, 1840
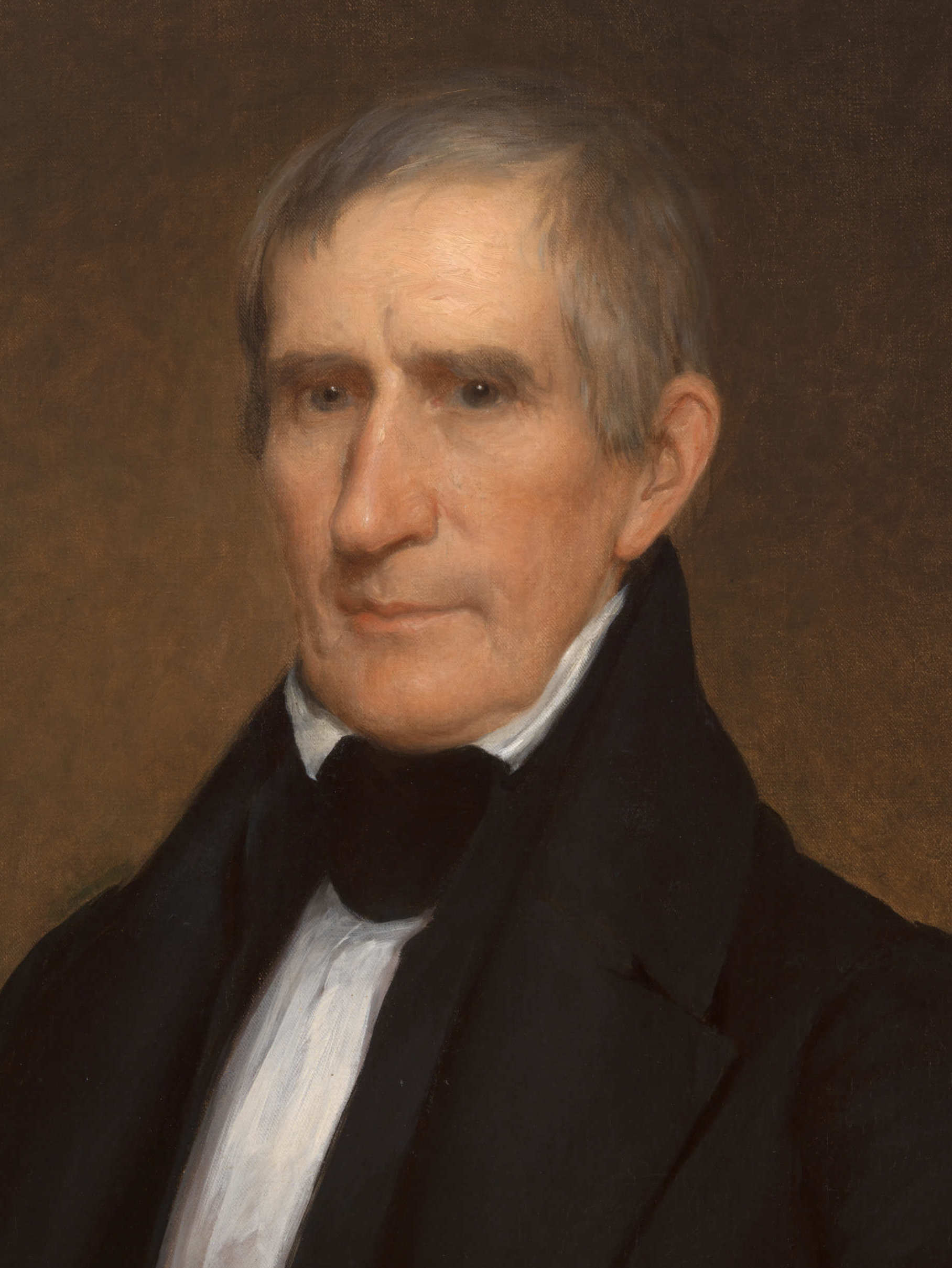

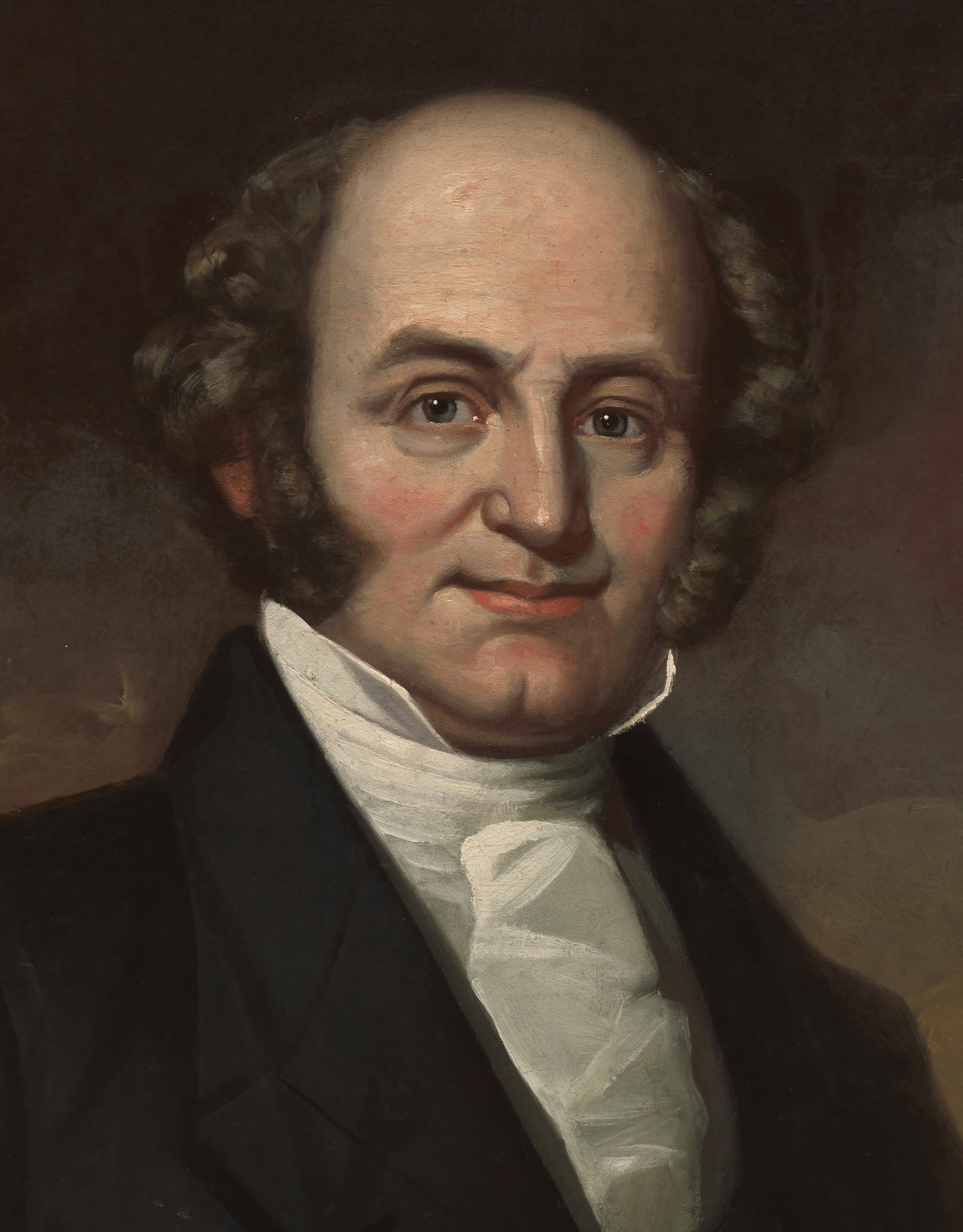
Nominee	William Henry Harrison	Martin Van Buren
Party	Whig	Democratic
Home state	Ohio	New York
Running mate	John Tyler	none
Electoral vote	30	0
Popular vote	144,010	143,676
Percentage	49.99%	49.88%
County results
Harrison
50–60%
60–70%
70–80%
Van Buren
50–60%
60–70%
70–80%
80–90%
President before election
Martin Van Buren
Democratic
Elected President
William Henry Harrison
Whig

A presidential election was held in Pennsylvania on October 30, 1840 as part of the 1840 United States presidential election. Voters chose 30 representatives, or electors to the Electoral College, who voted for President and Vice President.

Pennsylvania voted for Whig challenger William Henry Harrison over Democratic incumbent Martin Van Buren by just 334 votes, a margin of 0.12%. It is the narrowest margin of victory in a presidential election in Pennsylvania history, with Donald Trump's 2016 win following close behind at 0.72%.

== Results ==
1840 United States presidential election in Pennsylvania
Party	Candidate	Votes	Percentage	Electoral votes
Whig	William Henry Harrison	144,010	49.99%	30
Democratic	Martin Van Buren (incumbent)	143,676	49.89%	0
Liberty	James G. Birney	340	0.12%	0
Totals		288,026	100.0%	30

== See also ==
- United States presidential elections in Pennsylvania
