= 1868 United States presidential election in Pennsylvania =

- November 3, 1868
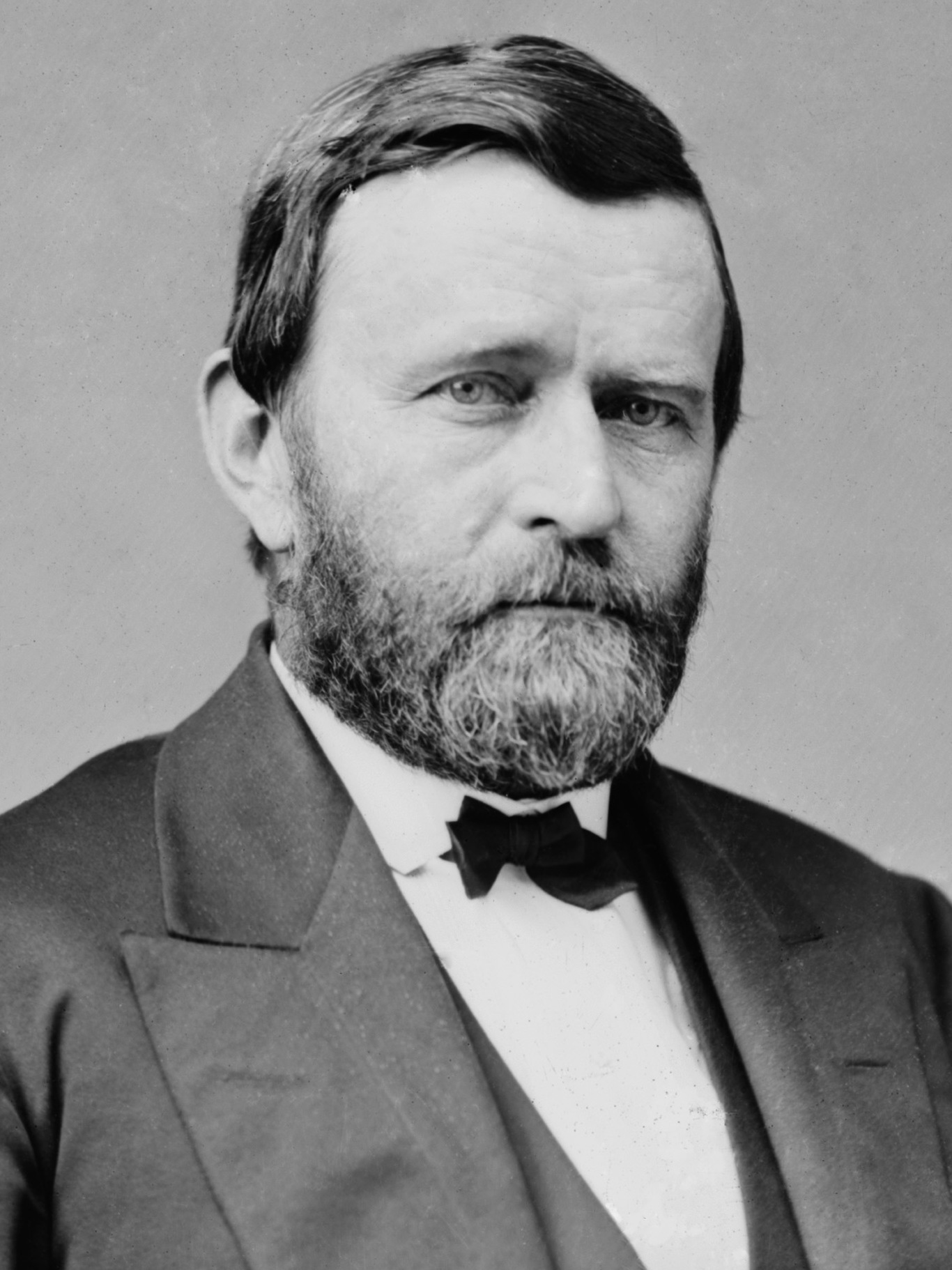

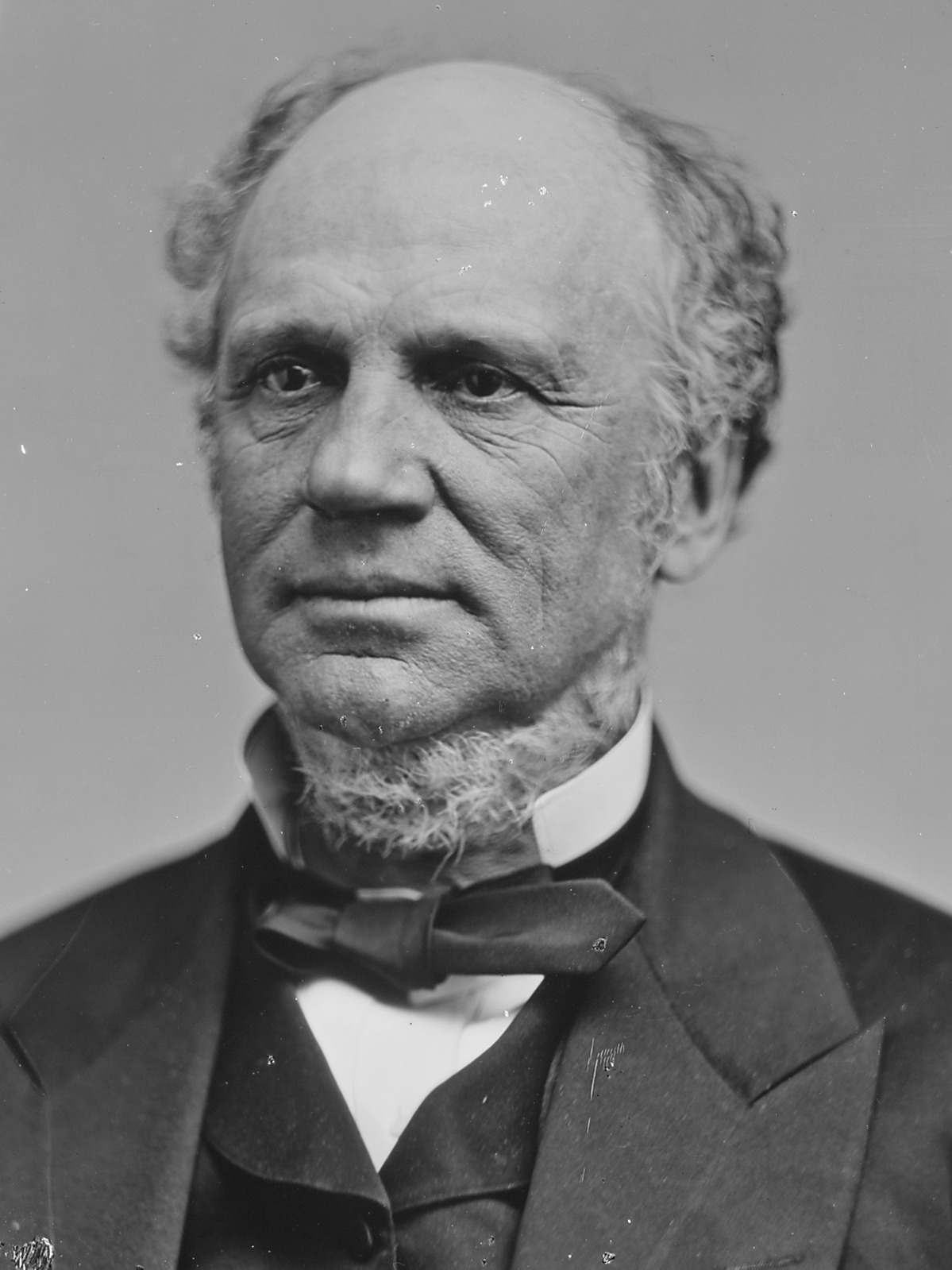
Nominee	Ulysses S. Grant	Horatio Seymour
Party	Republican	Democratic
Home state	Illinois	New York
Running mate	Schuyler Colfax	Francis Preston Blair Jr.
Electoral vote	26	0
Popular vote	342,280	313,382
Percentage	52.20%	47.80%
County results
Grant
50–60%
60–70%
70–80%
Seymour
50–60%
60–70%
70–80%
President before election
Andrew Johnson
Democratic
Elected President
Ulysses S. Grant
Republican

A presidential election was held in Pennsylvania on November 3, 1868, as part of the 1868 United States presidential election. Voters chose 26 representatives, or electors to the Electoral College, who voted for president and vice president.

Pennsylvania voted for the Republican nominee, Ulysses S. Grant, over the Democratic nominee, Horatio Seymour. Grant won Pennsylvania by a margin of 4.4%.

== Results ==
1868 United States presidential election in Pennsylvania
Party	Candidate	Votes	Percentage	Electoral votes
Republican	Ulysses S. Grant	342,280	52.20%	26
Democratic	Horatio Seymour	313,382	47.80%	0
Totals		655,662	100.0%	26

== See also ==
- United States presidential elections in Pennsylvania
