= 1852 United States presidential election in Pennsylvania =

- November 2, 1852

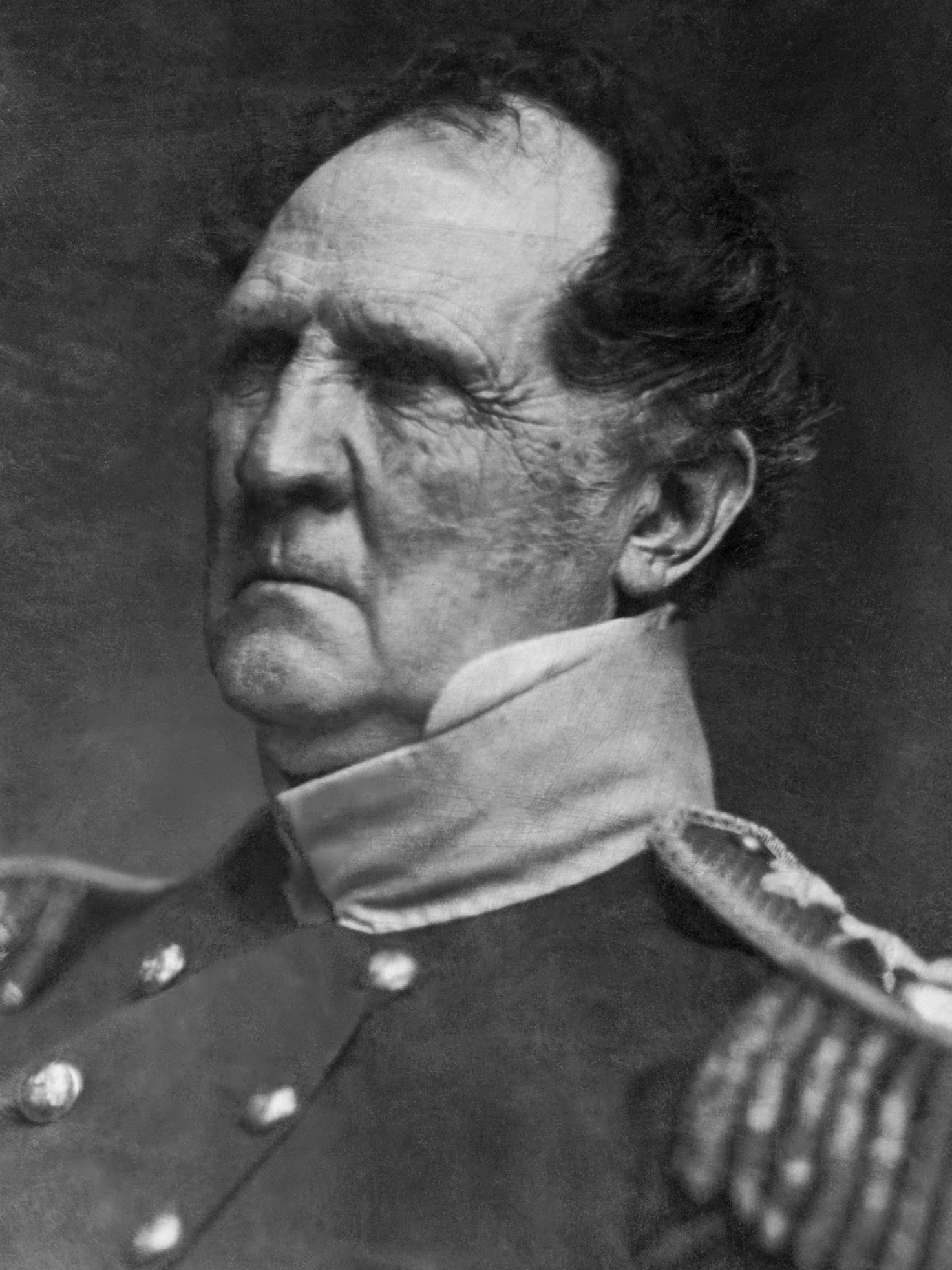
Nominee	Franklin Pierce	Winfield Scott
Party	Democratic	Whig
Home state	New Hampshire	New Jersey
Running mate	William R. King	William Alexander Graham
Electoral vote	27	0
Popular vote	198,562	179,104
Percentage	51.20%	46.18%

Pierce
40–50%
50–60%
60–70%
70–80%
80–90%
Scott
40–50%
50–60%
60–70%
70–80%
Tie/No Votes
President before election
Millard Fillmore
Whig
Elected President
Franklin Pierce
Democratic

A presidential election was held in Pennsylvania on November 2, 1852, as part of the 1852 United States presidential election. Voters chose 27 representatives, or electors to the Electoral College, who voted for President and Vice President.

Pennsylvania voted for the Democratic candidate, Franklin Pierce, over the Whig candidate, Winfield Scott. Pierce won the state by a margin of 5.02%.

Bradford, McKean, Potter and Tioga counties have only voted Democratic once since this election, in 1964.

== Results ==
1852 United States presidential election in Pennsylvania
Party	Candidate	Votes	Percentage	Electoral votes
Democratic	Franklin Pierce	198,562	51.20%	27
Whig	Winfield Scott	179,104	46.18%	0
Free Soil	John P. Hale	8,495	2.19%	0
Native American	Jacob Broom	1,678	0.43%	0
Totals		387,839	100.0%	27

=== Results by county ===
County	Franklin Pierce Democratic		Winfield Scott Whig		John P. Hale Free Soil		Various candidates Other parties		Margin		Total votes cast
County	#	%	#	%	#	%	#	%	#	%	Total votes cast
Adams	2,018	42.54%	2,725	57.44%	31	0.65%	0	0.00%	-707	-14.90%	4,744
Allegheny	7,226	41.07%	9,165	52.09%	966	5.49%	239	1.36%	-1,939	-11.02%	17,596
Armstrong	2,430	51.99%	2,093	44.78%	142	3.04%	9	0.19%	337	7.21%	4,674
Beaver	1,943	46.04%	1,805	42.77%	361	8.55%	111	2.63%	138	3.27%	4,220
Bedford	2,319	50.50%	2,273	49.50%	0	0.00%	0	0.00%	46	1.00%	4,592
Berks	9,503	65.91%	4,913	34.08%	2	0.01%	0	0.00%	4,590	31.84%	14,418
Blair	1,931	42.66%	2,590	57.22%	5	0.11%	0	0.00%	-659	-14.56%	4,526
Bradford	3,930	50.79%	3,526	45.57%	281	3.63%	0	0.00%	404	5.22%	7,737
Bucks	5,766	53.52%	4,928	45.74%	58	0.54%	22	0.20%	838	7.78%	10,774
Butler	2,533	45.79%	2,833	51.21%	165	2.98%	1	0.02%	-300	-5.42%	5,532
Cambria	2,035	57.96%	1,461	41.61%	15	0.43%	0	0.00%	574	16.35%	3,511
Carbon	1,311	63.64%	749	36.36%	0	0.00%	0	0.00%	562	27.28%	2,060
Centre	2,993	60.97%	1,916	39.03%	0	0.00%	0	0.00%	1,077	21.94%	4,909
Chester	5,520	47.76%	5,700	49.32%	338	2.92%	0	0.00%	-180	-1.56%	11,558
Clarion	2,642	67.95%	1,218	31.33%	28	0.72%	0	0.00%	1,424	36.63%	3,888
Clearfield	1,733	62.93%	997	36.20%	24	0.87%	0	0.00%	736	26.72%	2,754
Clinton	1,318	56.91%	996	43.00%	2	0.09%	0	0.00%	322	13.90%	2,316
Columbia	2,102	64.34%	1,165	35.66%	0	0.00%	0	0.00%	937	28.68%	3,267
Crawford	3,427	48.21%	2,775	39.04%	906	12.75%	0	0.00%	652	9.17%	7,108
Cumberland	3,188	52.56%	2,878	47.44%	0	0.00%	0	0.00%	310	5.11%	6,066
Dauphin	2,675	41.92%	3,673	57.56%	29	0.45%	4	0.06%	-998	-15.64%	6,381
Delaware	1,737	44.34%	2,073	52.92%	107	2.73%	0	0.00%	-336	-8.58%	3,917
Elk	423	70.62%	163	27.21%	13	2.17%	0	0.00%	260	43.41%	599
Erie	2,738	37.18%	4,015	54.52%	611	8.30%	0	0.00%	-1,277	-17.34%	7,364
Fayette	3,867	55.47%	3,032	43.49%	72	1.03%	0	0.00%	835	11.98%	6,971
Franklin	3,358	46.03%	3,904	53.51%	3	0.04%	0	0.00%	-546	-7.48%	7,265
Fulton	831	53.24%	729	46.70%	1	0.06%	0	0.00%	102	6.54%	1,561
Greene	2,602	62.10%	1,559	37.21%	29	0.69%	0	0.00%	1,043	24.89%	4,190
Huntingdon	2,041	44.82%	2,511	55.13%	2	0.04%	0	0.00%	-470	-10.32%	4,554
Indiana	1,827	40.66%	2,387	53.13%	279	6.21%	0	0.00%	-560	-12.46%	4,493
Jefferson	1,484	56.62%	1,115	42.54%	22	0.84%	0	0.00%	369	14.08%	2,621
Juniata	1,368	56.30%	1,062	43.70%	0	0.00%	0	0.00%	306	12.60%	2,430
Lancaster	6,578	36.00%	11,637	63.69%	53	0.29%	3	0.02%	-5,059	-27.69%	18,271
Lawrence	1,064	29.87%	1,984	55.70%	514	14.43%	0	0.00%	-920	-25.83%	3,562
Lebanon	2,118	40.54%	3,105	59.44%	1	0.02%	0	0.00%	-987	-18.90%	5,224
Lehigh	3,493	53.84%	2,993	46.13%	2	0.03%	0	0.00%	500	7.71%	6,488
Luzerne	5,340	61.53%	3,339	38.47%	0	0.00%	0	0.00%	2,001	23.06%	8,679
Lycoming	2,790	57.16%	2,085	42.72%	5	0.10%	1	0.02%	705	14.44%	4,881
McKean	597	55.28%	405	37.50%	78	7.22%	0	0.00%	192	17.78%	1,080
Mercer	2,693	47.48%	2,210	38.97%	768	13.54%	0	0.00%	483	8.51%	5,671
Mifflin	1,620	53.78%	1,392	46.22%	0	0.00%	0	0.00%	228	7.56%	3,012
Monroe	2,098	83.39%	418	16.61%	0	0.00%	0	0.00%	1,680	66.78%	2,516
Montgomery	5,767	53.79%	4,791	44.68%	160	1.49%	4	0.04%	976	9.11%	10,722
Montour	1,455	62.69%	866	37.31%	0	0.00%	0	0.00%	589	25.38%	2,321
Northampton	4,403	59.65%	2,978	40.35%	0	0.00%	0	0.00%	1,425	19.30%	7,381
Northumberland	2,451	60.22%	1,619	39.77%	0	0.00%	0	0.00%	832	20.45%	4,070
Perry	2,159	60.44%	1,413	39.56%	0	0.00%	0	0.00%	746	20.88%	3,572
Philadelphia	26,022	49.69%	24,573	46.92%	626	1.20%	1,148	2.19%	1,449	2.77%	52,369
Pike	834	80.50%	202	19.50%	0	0.00%	0	0.00%	632	61.00%	1,036
Potter	661	52.92%	263	21.06%	325	26.02%	0	0.00%	336 (Note: In this county where Hale ran second ahead of Scott, margin given is Pierce vote minus Hale vote and percentage margin is Pierce percentage minus Hale percentage.)	26.90%	1,249
Schuylkill	4,758	52.87%	4,128	45.87%	10	0.11%	104	1.16%	630	7.00%	9,000
Somerset	1,203	28.72%	2,986	71.28%	0	0.00%	0	0.00%	-1,783	-42.56%	4,189
Sullivan	426	64.35%	177	26.74%	59	8.91%	0	0.00%	249	37.61%	662
Susquehanna	3,046	57.52%	2,035	38.43%	215	4.06%	0	0.00%	1,011	19.09%	5,296
Tioga	2,614	61.40%	1,564	36.74%	79	1.86%	0	0.00%	1,050	24.66%	4,257
Union	1,994	39.29%	3,081	60.71%	0	0.00%	0	0.00%	-1,087	-21.42%	5,075
Venango	1,899	58.09%	1,164	35.61%	204	6.24%	2	0.06%	735	22.48%	3,269
Warren	1,629	58.79%	1,082	39.05%	60	2.16%	0	0.00%	547	19.74%	2,771
Washington	4,063	49.17%	3,810	46.11%	370	4.48%	20	0.24%	253	3.06%	8,263
Wayne	2,362	65.34%	1,232	34.08%	21	0.58%	0	0.00%	1,130	31.26%	3,615
Westmoreland	5,509	62.37%	3,203	36.27%	120	1.36%	0	0.00%	2,306	26.10%	8,832
Wyoming	1,258	60.36%	807	38.72%	19	0.92%	0	0.00%	451	21.64%	2,084
York	5,585	54.24%	4,700	45.65%	11	0.11%	0	0.00%	885	8.59%	10,296
Totals	198,562	51.20%	179,104	46.18%	8,495	2.19%	1,678	0.43%	19,458	5.02%	387,839

== See also ==
- United States presidential elections in Pennsylvania
