= United States presidential elections in Pennsylvania =

Presidential elections in Pennsylvania
- Number of elections: 60
- Voted Democratic: 20
- Voted Republican: 27
- Voted other: 14
- Voted for winning candidate: 49
- Voted for losing candidate: 11

United States presidential elections in Pennsylvania occur when voters in the U.S. Commonwealth of Pennsylvania cast ballots for electors to the Electoral College as part of a national election to elect the President and Vice President of the United States. Regularly scheduled general elections occur on Election Day, coinciding with elections in the other 49 states and the District of Columbia.

As in other states in the U.S., presidential elections are indirect elections. Voters do not cast ballots directly for a presidential candidate, but rather a slate of electors pledged to support that candidate, with the victorious slate of electors casting their ballots directly for President and Vice President of the United States as part of the Electoral College. During the first presidential election in 1789, Pennsylvania was allotted 15 electoral votes. In 2024, the most recent election, the state was allotted 19. This number, proportional to the state's population and decided every 10 years after a census, peaked at 38 from the 1912 election through the 1928 election. The next presidential election in Pennsylvania, coinciding with the national election, is scheduled for November 7, 2028.

The list below contains election returns from all 60 quadrennial presidential elections in Pennsylvania, beginning with the first in 1789 and ending with the most recent in 2024. Incumbent Presidents are listed as well as presidential candidates who carried Pennsylvania and runner(s)-up in the state, including major third-party candidates (garnering 5% or more of the popular vote). Bold indicates the candidate who won the election nationally. Parties are color-coded to the left of a President's or candidate's name according to the key below. The popular vote and percentage margins listed in the "Margin" column are the differences between the total votes received and percentage of the popular vote received by the top two finishers in the corresponding election (i.e. the margin-of-victory of a candidate who carried Pennsylvania over the nearest competitor). The "E.V." section denotes the number of electoral votes cast in favor of the candidate who carried the state, which has been unanimous except for two occasions—1796 and 1800—in which the number in parentheses represents the number of votes cast for the runner-up.

In all, the Republican Party has carried Pennsylvania in 27 presidential elections, the Democratic Party in 20, the Democratic-Republican Party in 8, the Whig Party in 2, and the Progressive Party in 1 (1912). A nonpartisan candidate, George Washington, carried the state twice (in 1789 and 1792). Pennsylvania has voted for the overall victor in 49 of 60 elections (81.7% of the time) and is tied with Michigan and Wisconsin for the longest active streak of voting for the winning candidate since 2008, last voting for a losing candidate in 2004 when they backed John Kerry.

== List of elections ==
View source data.

Parties

Independent Federalist Democratic-Republican Democratic Whig Republican National Republican Anti-Masonic Know Nothing/American Southern Democratic National Union (1864) Liberal Republican Progressive (1912) Socialist Progressive (1924) American Independent Reform

Election	Incumbent president	Pennsylvania winner	Votes	E.V.	PA runner(s)-up	Votes	Margin	Turnout (Note: Percentage of voting age population (VAP) unless otherwise noted.)	Notes
**1789**	Office established	**George Washington**	7,383 (100.00%)	15	None	—	—		
**1792**	George Washington	**George Washington**	4,576 (100.00%)	15	None	—	—		
**1796**	George Washington	Thomas Jefferson	12,516 (50.58%)	14 (1)	**John Adams**	12,229 (49.42%)	289 (1.16%)		(Note: One electoral vote was cast for John Adams.)
**1800**	John Adams	**Thomas Jefferson**	60 (64.52%)	8 (7)	John Adams	33 (35.48%)	27 (29.04%)	—	(Note: Electors in 1800 were chosen by the state legislature. In addition to eight electoral votes for Jefferson, Pennsylvania cast seven for Adams.)
**1804**	Thomas Jefferson	**Thomas Jefferson**	22,081 (94.69%)	20	Charles Pinckney	1,239 (5.31%)	20,842 (89.38%)		
**1808**	Thomas Jefferson	**James Madison**	42,508 (78.37%)	20	Charles Pinckney	11,735 (21.63%)	30,733 (56.74%)		
**1812**	James Madison	**James Madison**	48,816 (62.60%)	25	DeWitt Clinton	29,162 (37.40%)	19,654 (25.20%)		
**1816**	James Madison	**James Monroe**	25,653 (59.33%)	25	Rufus King	17,588 (40.67%)	8,065 (18.66%)		
**1820**	James Monroe	**James Monroe**	30,313 (94.12%)	24	DeWitt Clinton	1,893 (5.88%)	28,420 (88.24%)		
1824	James Monroe	Andrew Jackson	35,929 (76.04%)	28	**John Q. Adams**	5,436 (11.50%)	30,493 (64.54%)		
1824	James Monroe	Andrew Jackson	35,929 (76.04%)	28	William H. Crawford	4,182 (8.85%)	30,493 (64.54%)		
**1828**	John Q. Adams	**Andrew Jackson**	101,652 (66.66%)	28	John Q. Adams	50,848 (33.34%)	50,804 (33.32%)		
**1832**	Andrew Jackson	**Andrew Jackson**	91,949 (57.96%)	30	William Wirt	66,689 (42.04%)	25,260 (15.92%)		
**1836**	Andrew Jackson	**Martin Van Buren**	91,457 (51.18%)	30	William H. Harrison	87,235 (48.82%)	4,222 (2.36%)		
**1840**	Martin Van Buren	**William H. Harrison**	144,010 (50.00%)	30	Martin Van Buren	143,676 (49.88%)	334 (0.12%)		
**1844**	John Tyler	**James K. Polk**	167,447 (50.50%)	26	Henry Clay	161,125 (48.59%)	6,322 (1.91%)		
**1848**	James K. Polk	**Zachary Taylor**	185,313 (50.28%)	26	Lewis Cass	171,976 (46.66%)	13,337 (1.91%)		
**1852**	Millard Fillmore	**Franklin Pierce**	198,562 (51.20%)	27	Winfield Scott	179,104 (46.18%)	19,458 (5.02%)		(Note: Zachary Taylor died in July 1850. Millard Fillmore served the remainder of the unexpired term and did not seek election to a full term.)
1856	Franklin Pierce	**James Buchanan**	230,686 (50.13%)	27	John C. Frémont	147,286 (32.01%)	83,400 (18.12%)		
1856	Franklin Pierce	**James Buchanan**	230,686 (50.13%)	27	Millard Fillmore	82,189 (17.86%)	83,400 (18.12%)		
**1860**	James Buchanan	**Abraham Lincoln**	268,030 (56.26%)	27	John C. Breckinridge	178,871 (37.54%)	89,159 (18.72%)		
**1864**	Abraham Lincoln	**Abraham Lincoln**	296,391 (51.75%)	26	George B. McClellan	276,316 (48.25%)	20,075 (3.50%)		(Note: Abraham Lincoln sought re-election on the National Union ticket in 1864.)
**1868**	Andrew Johnson	**Ulysses S. Grant**	342,280 (52.20%)	26	Horatio Seymour	313,382 (47.80%)	28,898 (4.40%)		(Note: Abraham Lincoln was assassinated in April 1865. Andrew Johnson served the remainder of the unexpired term and did not seek election to a full term.)
**1872**	Ulysses S. Grant	**Ulysses S. Grant**	349,589 (62.07%)	29	Horace Greeley	212,041 (37.65%)	137,548 (24.42%)		
**1876**	Ulysses S. Grant	**Rutherford B. Hayes**	384,184 (50.62%)	29	Samuel J. Tilden	366,204 (48.25%)	17,980 (2.37%)		
**1880**	Rutherford B. Hayes	**James A. Garfield**	444,704 (50.84%)	29	Winfield Scott Hancock	407,428 (46.57%)	37,276 (4.27%)		
**1884**	Chester A. Arthur	James G. Blaine	478,804 (52.97%)	30	**Grover Cleveland**	392,785 (43.46%)	86,019 (9.51%)		(Note: James Garfield was assassinated in 1881. Chester Arthur served the remainder of the unexpired term and did not seek election to a full term.)
**1888**	Grover Cleveland	**Benjamin Harrison**	526,091 (52.74%)	30	Grover Cleveland	446,633 (44.77%)	79,458 (7.97%)		
**1892**	Benjamin Harrison	Benjamin Harrison	516,011 (51.45%)	32	**Grover Cleveland**	452,264 (45.09%)	63,747 (6.36%)		
**1896**	Grover Cleveland	**William McKinley**	728,300 (60.98%)	32	William Jennings Bryan	433,228 (36.27%)	295,072 (24.71%)		
**1900**	William McKinley	**William McKinley**	712,665 (60.74%)	32	William Jennings Bryan	424,232 (36.16%)	288,433 (24.58%)		
**1904**	Theodore Roosevelt	**Theodore Roosevelt**	840,949 (68.00%)	34	Alton B. Parker	337,998 (27.33%)	502,951 (40.67%)		(Note: William McKinley was assassinated in September 1901. Theodore Roosevelt served the remainder of the unexpired term and sought and won election to a full term.)
**1908**	Theodore Roosevelt	**William Howard Taft**	745,779 (58.84%)	34	William Jennings Bryan	448,782 (35.41%)	296,997 (23.43%)		
1912	William Howard Taft	Theodore Roosevelt	444,894 (36.53%)	38	**Woodrow Wilson**	395,637 (32.49%)	49,257 (4.04%)		
1912	William Howard Taft	Theodore Roosevelt	444,894 (36.53%)	38	William Howard Taft	273,360 (22.45%)	49,257 (4.04%)		
1912	William Howard Taft	Theodore Roosevelt	444,894 (36.53%)	38	Eugene V. Debs	83,614 (6.87%)	49,257 (4.04%)		
**1916**	Woodrow Wilson	Charles Evans Hughes	703,823 (54.26%)	38	**Woodrow Wilson**	521,784 (40.22%)	406,826 (14.04%)		
**1920**	Woodrow Wilson	**Warren G. Harding**	1,218,216 (65.76%)	38	James M. Cox	503,843 (27.20%)	714,373 (38.56%)		
1924	Calvin Coolidge	**Calvin Coolidge**	1,401,481 (65.34%)	38	John W. Davis	409,192 (19.08%)	992,289 (46.26%)		(Note: Warren Harding died in August 1923. Calvin Coolidge served the remainder of the unexpired term and sought and won election to a full term.)
1924	Calvin Coolidge	**Calvin Coolidge**	1,401,481 (65.34%)	38	Robert M. La Follette	307,567 (14.34%)	992,289 (46.26%)		(Note: Warren Harding died in August 1923. Calvin Coolidge served the remainder of the unexpired term and sought and won election to a full term.)
**1928**	Calvin Coolidge	**Herbert Hoover**	2,055,382 (65.24%)	38	Al Smith	1,067,586 (33.89%)	987,796 (31.35%)		
**1932**	Herbert Hoover	Herbert Hoover	1,453,540 (50.84%)	36	**Franklin D. Roosevelt**	1,295,948 (45.33%)	157,592 (5.51%)		
**1936**	Franklin D. Roosevelt	**Franklin D. Roosevelt**	2,353,987 (56.88%)	36	Alf Landon	1,690,200 (40.84%)	663,787 (16.04%)		
**1940**	Franklin D. Roosevelt	**Franklin D. Roosevelt**	2,171,035 (53.23%)	36	Wendell Willkie	1,889,848 (46.33%)	281,187 (6.90%)		
**1944**	Franklin D. Roosevelt	**Franklin D. Roosevelt**	1,940,479 (51.14%)	35	Thomas E. Dewey	1,835,054 (48.36%)	105,425 (2.78%)		
**1948**	Harry S. Truman	Thomas E. Dewey	1,902,197 (50.93%)	35	**Harry S. Truman**	1,752,426 (46.92%)	149,771 (4.01%)		(Note: Franklin D. Roosevelt died in April 1945. Harry S. Truman served the remainder of the unexpired term and sought and won election to a full term.)
**1952**	Harry S. Truman	**Dwight D. Eisenhower**	2,415,789 (52.74%)	32	Adlai Stevenson II	2,146,269 (46.85%)	269,520 (5.89%)		
**1956**	Dwight D. Eisenhower	**Dwight D. Eisenhower**	2,585,252 (56.49%)	32	Adlai Stevenson II	1,981,769 (43.30%)	603,483 (5.89%)		
**1960**	Dwight D. Eisenhower	**John F. Kennedy**	2,556,282 (51.06%)	32	Richard Nixon	2,439,956 (48.74%)	116,326 (2.32%)	70.3%	
**1964**	Lyndon B. Johnson	**Lyndon B. Johnson**	3,130,954 (64.92%)	29	Barry Goldwater	1,673,657 (34.70%)	1,457,297 (30.22%)	67.9%	(Note: John F. Kennedy was assassinated in November 1963. Lyndon B. Johnson served the remainder of the unexpired term and sought and won election to a full term.)
1968	Lyndon B. Johnson	Hubert Humphrey	2,259,405 (47.59%)	29	**Richard Nixon**	2,090,017 (44.02%)	169,388 (3.57%)	65.3%	
1968	Lyndon B. Johnson	Hubert Humphrey	2,259,405 (47.59%)	29	George Wallace	378,582 (7.97%)	169,388 (3.57%)	65.3%	
**1972**	Richard Nixon	**Richard Nixon**	2,714,521 (59.11%)	27	George McGovern	1,796,951 (39.13%)	917,570 (19.98%)	56.0%	
**1976**	Gerald Ford	**Jimmy Carter**	2,328,677 (50.40%)	27	Gerald Ford	2,205,604 (47.73%)	123,073 (2.67%)	54.2%	(Note: Richard Nixon resigned in August 1974. Gerald Ford served the remainder of the unexpired term and sought election to a full term.)
1980	Jimmy Carter	**Ronald Reagan**	2,261,872 (49.59%)	27	Jimmy Carter	1,937,540 (42.48%)	324,332 (7.11%)	51.9%	
1980	Jimmy Carter	**Ronald Reagan**	2,261,872 (49.59%)	27	John B. Anderson	292,921 (6.42%)	324,332 (7.11%)	51.9%	
**1984**	Ronald Reagan	**Ronald Reagan**	2,584,323 (53.34%)	25	Walter Mondale	2,228,131 (45.99%)	356,202 (7.35%)	54.0%	
**1988**	Ronald Reagan	**George H. W. Bush**	2,300,087 (50.70%)	25	Michael Dukakis	2,194,944 (48.39%)	105,143 (2.31%)	50.1%	
1992	George H. W. Bush	**Bill Clinton**	2,239,164 (45.15%)	23	George H. W. Bush	1,791,841 (36.12%)	447,323 (9.03%)	54.3%	
1992	George H. W. Bush	**Bill Clinton**	2,239,164 (45.15%)	23	Ross Perot	902,667 (18.20%)	447,323 (9.03%)	54.3%	
1996	Bill Clinton	**Bill Clinton**	2,215,819 (49.17%)	23	Bob Dole	1,801,169 (39.97%)	414,650 (9.20%)	48.9%	
1996	Bill Clinton	**Bill Clinton**	2,215,819 (49.17%)	23	Ross Perot	430,984 (9.56%)	414,650 (9.20%)	48.9%	
**2000**	Bill Clinton	Al Gore	2,485,967 (50.61%)	23	**George W. Bush**	2,281,127 (46.44%)	204,840 (4.17%)	52.4%	
**2004**	George W. Bush	John Kerry	2,938,095 (50.96%)	21	**George W. Bush**	2,793,847 (48.46%)	144,248 (2.50%)	60.0%	
**2008**	George W. Bush	**Barack Obama**	3,276,363 (54.65%)	21	John McCain	2,655,885 (44.30%)	620,478 (10.35%)	62.1%	
**2012**	Barack Obama	**Barack Obama**	2,990,274 (52.08%)	20	Mitt Romney	2,680,434 (46.68%)	309,840 (5.40%)	58.1%	
**2016**	Barack Obama	**Donald Trump**	2,970,733 (48.17%)	20	Hillary Clinton	2,926,441 (47.46%)	44,292 (0.72%)	60.27%	
**2020**	Donald Trump	**Joe Biden**	3,458,229 (49.85%)	20	Donald Trump	3,377,674 (48.84%)	80,555 (1.16%)	70.93%	
**2024**	Joe Biden	**Donald Trump**	3,543,308 (50.37%)	19	Kamala Harris	3,423,042 (48.66%)	120,266 (1.71%)	76.60%	

Note: Bold candidate indicates president elected nationally.

== See also ==
- Elections in Pennsylvania
- List of United States Senate elections in Pennsylvania
- List of Pennsylvania gubernatorial elections
