= 1844 United States presidential election in Pennsylvania =

- November 1, 1844

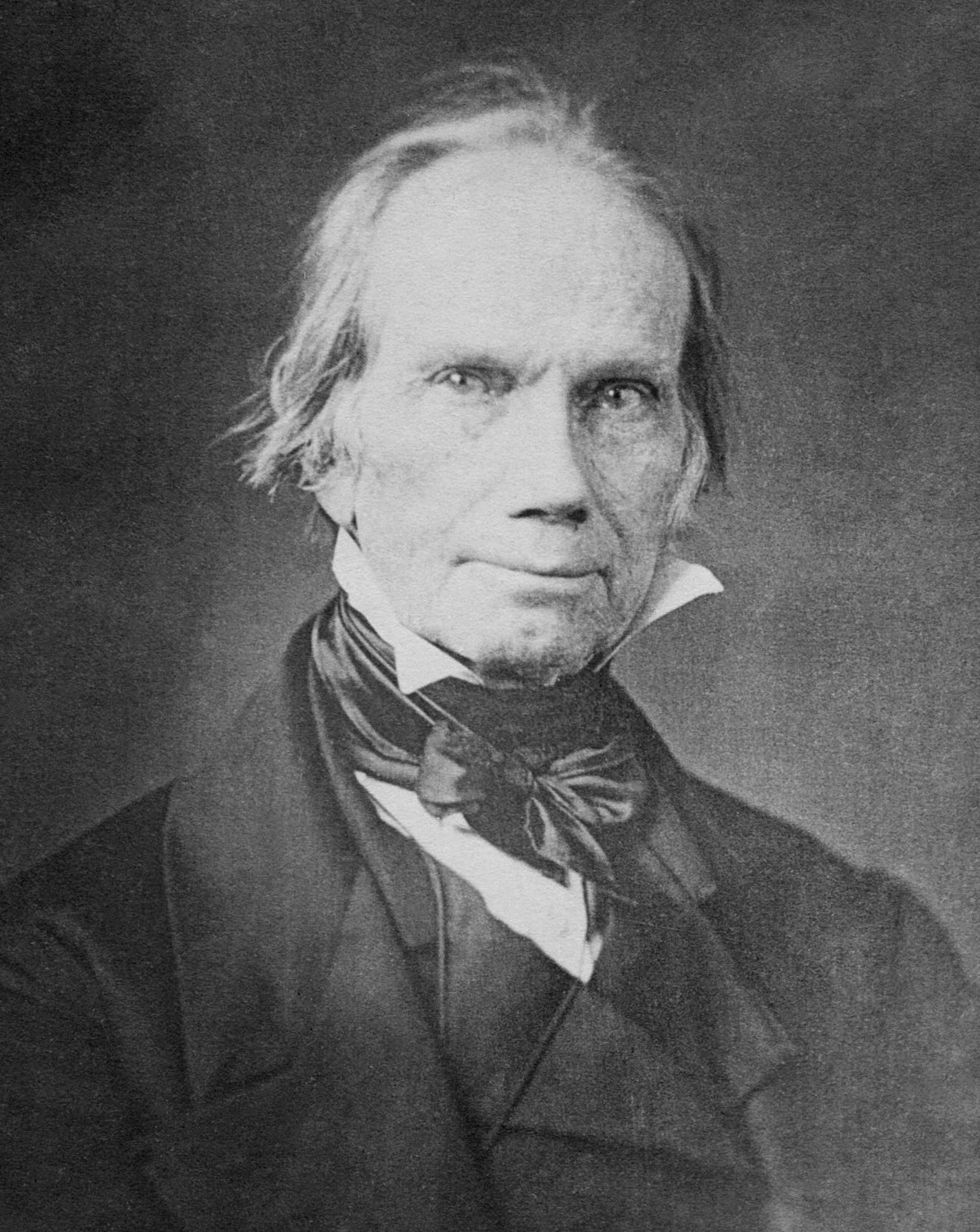
| Nominee | James K. Polk | Henry Clay |
| Party | Democratic | Whig |
| Home state | Tennessee | Kentucky |
| Running mate | George M. Dallas | Theodore Frelinghuysen |
| Electoral vote | 26 | 0 |
| Popular vote | 167,447 | 161,125 |
| Percentage | 50.50% | 48.59% |
County results
Polk
40–50%
50–60%
60–70%
80–90%
Clay
50–60%
60–70%
70–80%
President before election
John Tyler
Independent
Elected President
James K. Polk
Democratic

A presidential election was held in Pennsylvania on November 1, 1844, as part of the 1844 United States presidential election. Voters chose 26 representatives, or electors to the Electoral College, who voted for President and Vice President.

Pennsylvania voted for the Democratic candidate, James K. Polk, over the Whig candidate, Henry Clay. Polk won Pennsylvania by a narrow margin of 1.91%.

== Results ==
1844 United States presidential election in Pennsylvania
| Party | Candidate | Votes | Percentage | Electoral votes |
|---|---|---|---|---|
| Democratic | James K. Polk | 167,447 | 50.50% | 26 |
| Whig | Henry Clay | 161,125 | 48.59% | 0 |
| Liberty | James G. Birney | 3,000 | 0.90% | 0 |
| Totals | | 331,572 | 100.0% | 26 |

== See also ==
- United States presidential elections in Pennsylvania
