= 1824 United States presidential election in Pennsylvania =

- October 26 – December 2, 1824
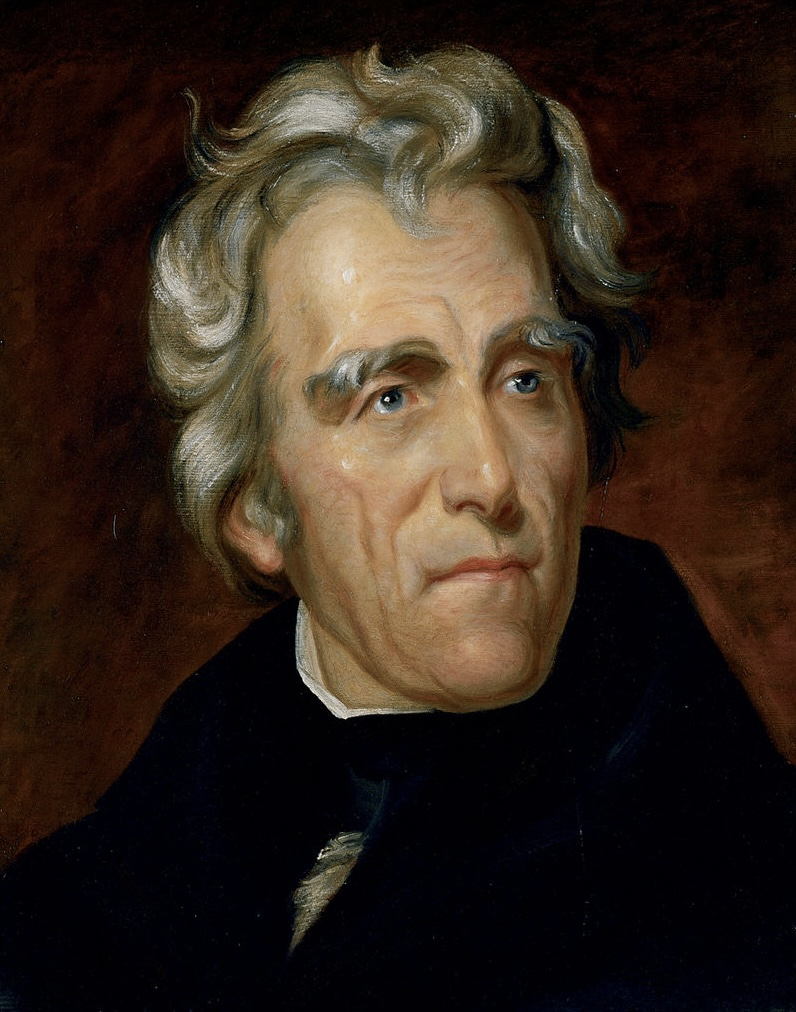

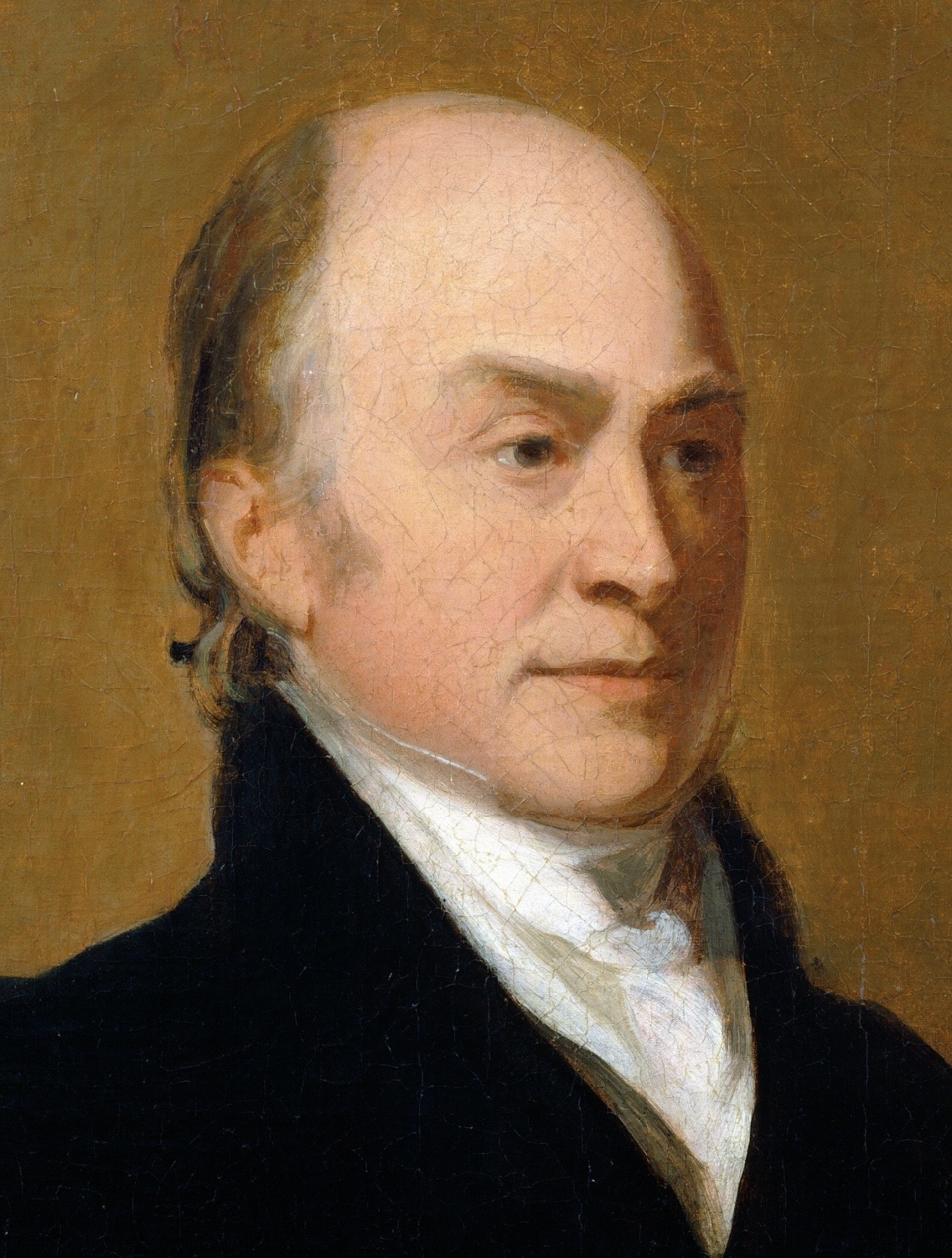

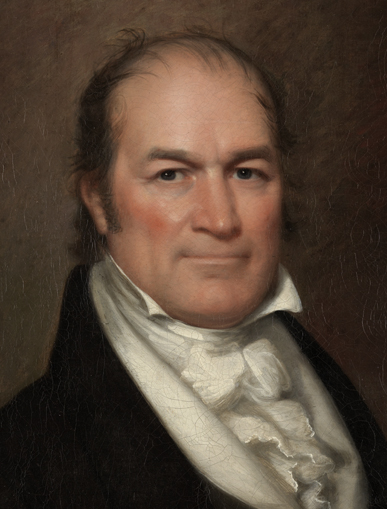
| Nominee | Andrew Jackson | John Quincy Adams | William H. Crawford |
| Party | Democratic-Republican | Democratic-Republican | Democratic-Republican |
| Home state | Tennessee | Massachusetts | Georgia |
| Running mate | John C. Calhoun | John C. Calhoun | Nathaniel Macon |
| Electoral vote | 28 | 0 | 0 |
| Popular vote | 35,929 | 5,436 | 4,182 |
| Percentage | 76.04% | 11.50% | 8.85% |
County results
Jackson
50–60%
60–70%
70–80%
80–90%
90–100%
President before election
James Monroe
Democratic-Republican
Elected President
John Quincy Adams
Democratic-Republican

A presidential election was held in Pennsylvania between October 26 and December 2, 1824, as part of the 1824 United States presidential election. Voters chose 28 representatives, or electors to the Electoral College, who voted for President and Vice President.

During this election, the Democratic-Republican Party was the only major national party, and 4 different candidates from this party sought the Presidency. Pennsylvania voted for Andrew Jackson over John Quincy Adams, William H. Crawford, and Henry Clay. Jackson won Pennsylvania by a wide margin of 64.54%.

This is the only time any presidential candidate has swept every Pennsylvania county.

== Results ==
1824 United States presidential election in Pennsylvania
| Party | Candidate | Votes | Percentage | Electoral votes |
|---|---|---|---|---|
| Democratic-Republican | Andrew Jackson | 35,929 | 76.04% | 28 |
| Democratic-Republican | John Quincy Adams | 5,436 | 11.50% | 0 |
| Democratic-Republican | William H. Crawford | 4,182 | 8.85% | 0 |
| Democratic-Republican | Henry Clay | 1,705 | 3.61% | 0 |
| Totals | | 47,252 | 100.0% | 28 |

== See also ==
- United States presidential elections in Pennsylvania
