= Sullivan County, Pennsylvania =

County in Pennsylvania, United States

- County
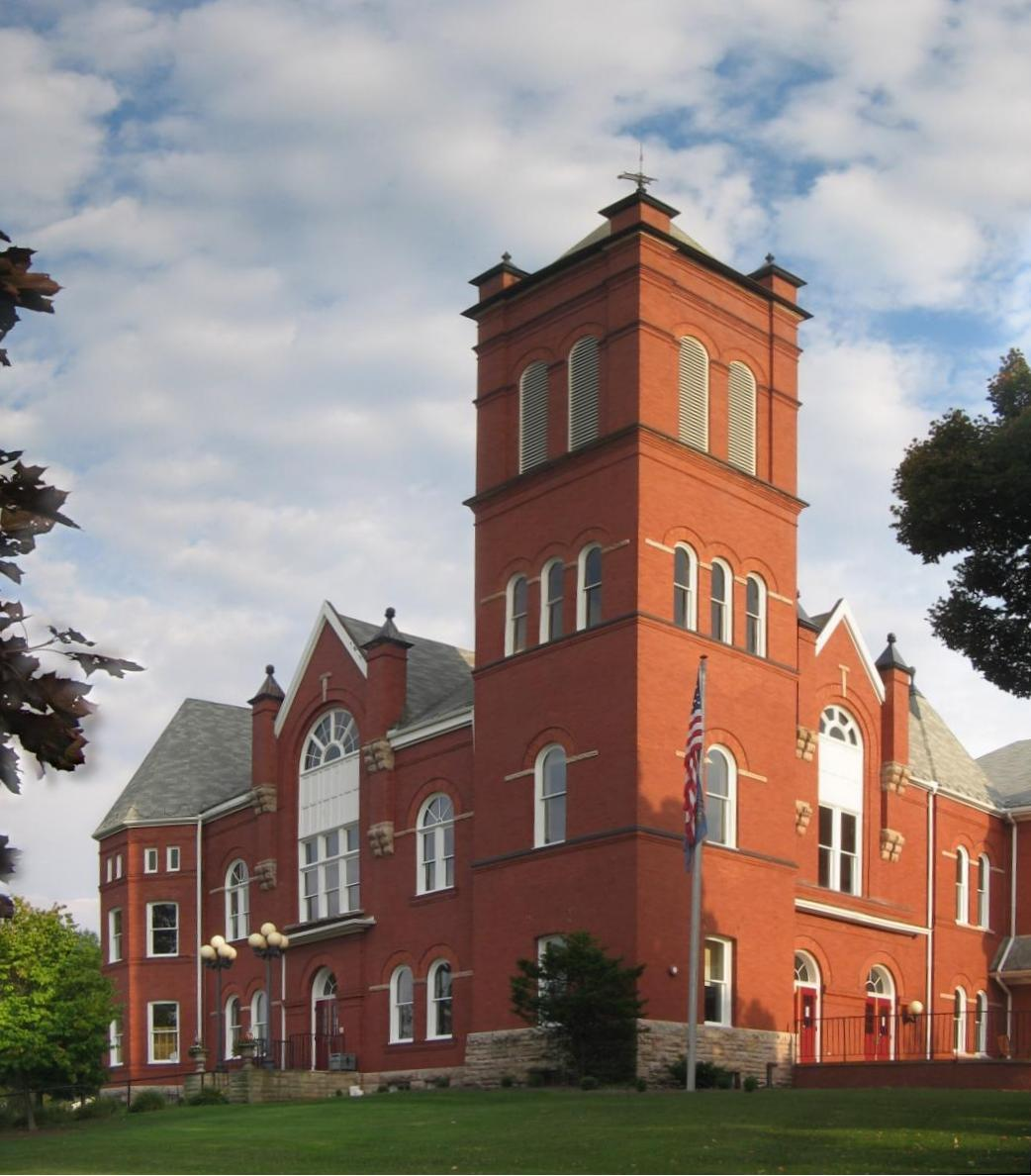
- Sullivan County Courthouse in Sullivan County, September 2006

- Location within the U.S. state of Pennsylvania
- Coordinates: 41°27′N 76°31′W
- Country: United States
- State: Pennsylvania
- Founded: March 15, 1847
- Named for: Charles C. Sullivan
- Seat: Laporte
- Largest borough: Dushore

Area
  - Total: 452 sq mi (1,170 km^{2})
  - Land: 450 sq mi (1,200 km^{2})
  - Water: 2.6 sq mi (6.7 km^{2}) 0.6%

Population (2020)
  - Total: 5,840
  - Estimate (2025): 5,856 ▲
  - Density: 13/sq mi (5.0/km^{2})
- Time zone: UTC−5 (Eastern)
  - Summer (DST): UTC−4 (EDT)
- Congressional district: 9th
- Website: www.sullivancountypa.gov

Sullivan County is a county in the Commonwealth of Pennsylvania. As of the 2020 census, the population was 5,840, making it the second-least populous county in Pennsylvania. Its county seat is Laporte. The county was created on March 15, 1847, from part of Lycoming County and named for Major General John Sullivan. The county is part of the Northeast Pennsylvania region of the state. (Note: Includes Luzerne, Lackawanna, Monroe, Schuylkill, Carbon, Pike, Bradford, Wayne, Susquehanna, Wyoming and Sullivan Counties)

== History ==
The land which became Sullivan County was originally purchased from the Iroquois by the Province of Pennsylvania in 1768, as part of the first Treaty of Fort Stanwix. It was then part of Northumberland County, then became part of Lycoming County when it was formed in 1795. Sullivan County itself was formed from the northeastern part of Lycoming County on March 15, 1847. It was the thirteenth and last county formed at least partly from Lycoming County (and the fifth entirely formed from it).

Sullivan County was named for Pennsylvania state senator Charles C. Sullivan, who "took an active part in procuring passage of the bill" establishing the county. However, according to Frederic A. Godcharles (1933), the county is named for General John Sullivan, who led the Sullivan Expedition against the Iroquois in 1779.

== Geography ==
According to the U.S. Census Bureau, the county has a total area of 452 square miles (1,170 km^{2}), of which 450 square miles (1,200 km^{2}) is land and 2.6 square miles (6.7 km^{2}) (0.6%) is water.

Elevation ranges from 2593 ft at North Mountain in Davidson Township to 779 ft on Loyalsock Creek at the Lycoming County line. The county is served by Pennsylvania Route 42, Pennsylvania Route 87, Pennsylvania Route 154, Pennsylvania Route 487, and U.S. Route 220. The major rivers in the county are Loyalsock Creek, Little Loyalsock Creek, Muncy Creek, and Fishing Creek. The majority of the land in Sullivan County is forest, but there is some farmland, especially in the northern part of the county. There are numerous river valleys in the southern and western parts of Sullivan County.

Sullivan has a warm-summer humid continental climate (Dfb) and average monthly temperatures in Laporte range from 21.8 °F in January to 67.9 °F in July.

=== Adjacent counties ===
- Bradford County (north)
- Wyoming County (east)
- Luzerne County (southeast)
- Columbia County (south)
- Lycoming County (west)

== Geology ==
Sullivan County lies predominantly within the Appalachian Plateau physiographic province, which is characterized by gently folded and faulted sedimentary rocks of middle to late Paleozoic age. The southern border of the county is approximately at the Allegheny Front, a geological boundary between the Ridge and Valley province and the plateau. (PA Geologic Survey Map 13). The mountains within the county are part of the Endless Mountains.

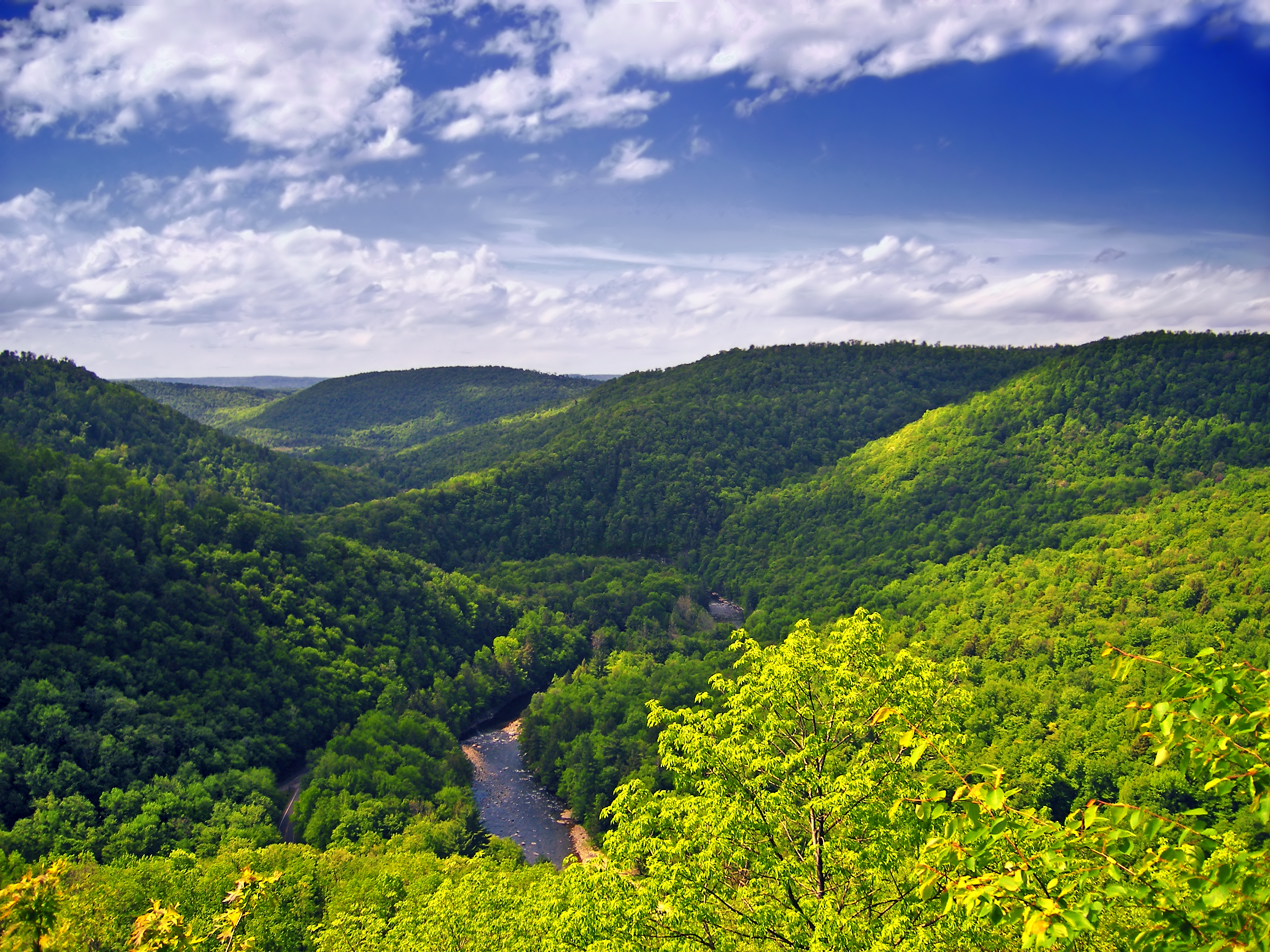
Worlds End State Park

The stratigraphic record of sedimentary rocks within the county spans from the Devonian Lock Haven Formation (exposed only in Lick Creek valley) to the coal-bearing Pennsylvanian Allegheny Formation. Generally, the Catskill Formation underlies most of the lowlands, and sandstones of the Huntley Mountain, Burgoon, Mauch Chunk, or Pottsville Formations cap the mountains. No igneous or metamorphic rocks exist within the county, other than possible glacial erratics.

Structurally, the bedrock of Sullivan County is gently folded, with the axes of two major anticlines (including the Wilmot Anticline) and two major synclines (Bernice-Mehoopany Syncline and Noxen Syncline) each trending roughly east–west. There are three mapped faults in the Allegheny Formation between the towns of Murray and Ringdale.

Nearly all of Sullivan County was glaciated several times in the past, during the Pleistocene epoch, or "Ice Age." (PA Geologic Survey Map 59). Most of the county is covered by glacial till of Late Wisconsinan age. Late Illinoian Stage deposits may underlie the Late Wisconsinan deposits, and these are exposed in the south central part of the county (roughly western Davidson Township).

The major rivers in Sullivan County are Loyalsock Creek and Muncy Creek. Both flow into the West Branch of the Susquehanna River. Some streams along the eastern border of the county flow into the North Branch of the Susquehanna River. All of Sullivan county is thus within the Chesapeake Bay Watershed.

Several small coal fields exist within Sullivan County. The fields contain either bituminous or semi-anthracite coal, and all occur within Pennsylvanian strata.

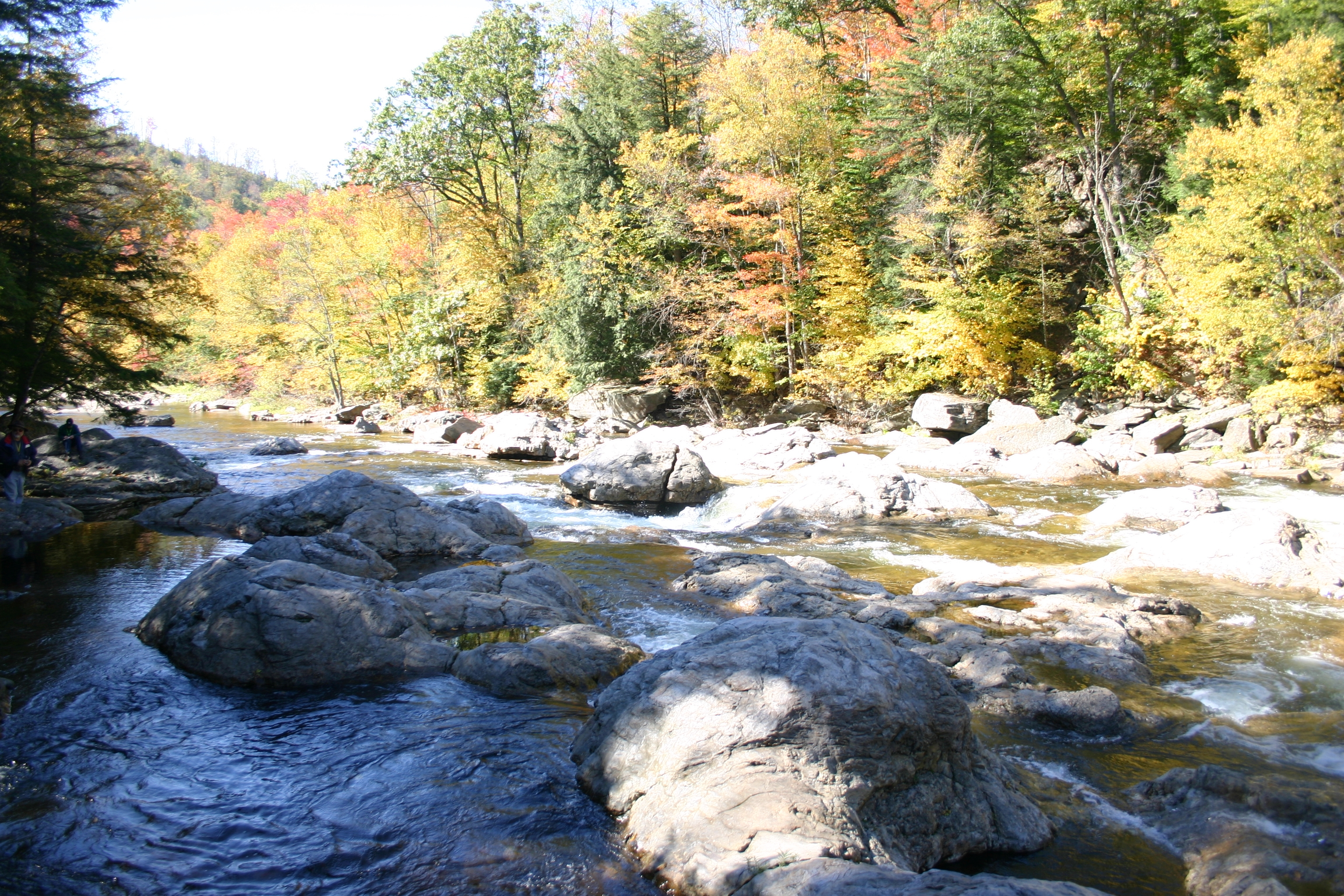
The Haystacks in Loyalsock Creek

Notable geologic features within Sullivan County include some of the following:

- The Haystacks (Huntley Mountain Formation), exposed along Loyalsock Creek south of Dushore, are sandstone mounds of unknown origin
- Ganoga Lake is the state's highest lake at 2265 ft above sea level
- Ricketts Glen State Park, with its many waterfalls
- Worlds End State Park, including an exposure of the Huntley Mountain Formation, and a "rock city" where cross-bedding is visible in the sandstone of the Pottsville Formation
- The Leberfinger Quarry (on Millview Mountain Rd northeast of Forksville), in the Lock Haven Formation where brachiopod fossils, trace fossils, and plant fossils can be observed
- Grand View, located at the southeast corner of the county on a knob of Red Rock Mountain, provides scenic views of the Allegheny Front

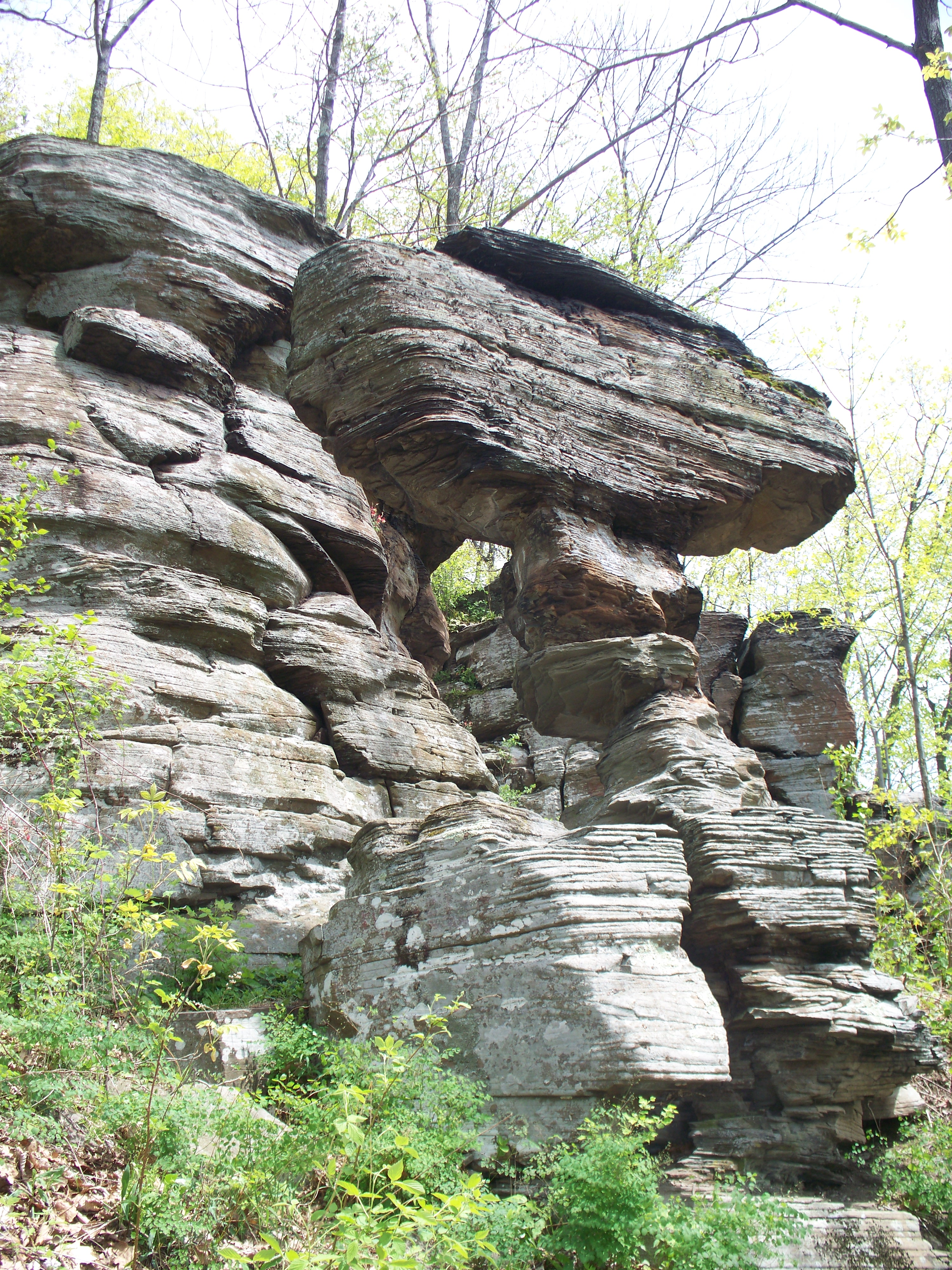
Ticklish Rock, at ground level

- Ticklish Rock, located near Glen Mawr up Rock Run Road, features a rock formation of the Devonian Catskill Formation.

=== Mountains ===
| Name | Height |
|---|---|
| North Mountain | 2,584 ft (788 meters) |
| Huckleberry Mountain | 2,496 ft (761 meters) |
| Roundtop | 2,484 ft (757 meters) |
| Prospect Hill | 2,140 ft (650 meters) |
| Tomkins Corners Vista | 2,110 ft (640 meters) |
| High Knob | 2,025 ft (617 meters) |
| Bear Mountain | 1,995 ft (608 meters) |
| Lovers Rock | 1,995 ft (608 meters) |
| Gooseberry Hill | 1,940 ft (590 meters) |
| Middle Hill | 1,927 ft (587 meters) |
| Camp Mountain | 1,920 ft (590 meters) |
| Hogback Hill | 1,923 ft (586 meters) |
| Pole Hill | 1,917 ft (584 meters) |
| Big Hill | 1,897 ft (578 meters) |
| Browns Vista | 1,819 ft (554 meters) |
| Lambert Hill | 1,743 (532 meters) |
| Warburton Hill | 1,743 ft (531 meters) |
| Molyneux Hill | 1,740 ft (530 meters) |
| Wright Hill | 1,717 ft (523 meters) |
| Shrimp Hill | 1,661 ft (506 meters) |

== Demographics ==
Historical population
| Census | Pop. | Note | %± |
|---|---|---|---|
| 1850 | 3,694 | | — |
| 1860 | 5,637 | | 52.6% |
| 1870 | 6,191 | | 9.8% |
| 1880 | 8,073 | | 30.4% |
| 1890 | 11,620 | | 43.9% |
| 1900 | 12,134 | | 4.4% |
| 1910 | 11,293 | | −6.9% |
| 1920 | 9,520 | | −15.7% |
| 1930 | 7,499 | | −21.2% |
| 1940 | 7,504 | | 0.1% |
| 1950 | 6,745 | | −10.1% |
| 1960 | 6,251 | | −7.3% |
| 1970 | 5,961 | | −4.6% |
| 1980 | 6,349 | | 6.5% |
| 1990 | 6,104 | | −3.9% |
| 2000 | 6,556 | | 7.4% |
| 2010 | 6,428 | | −2.0% |
| 2020 | 5,840 | | −9.1% |
| 2025 (est.) | 5,856 | ▲ | 0.3% |
U.S. Decennial Census; 1790-1960 1900-1990; 1990-2000 2010-2017 2010-2020

=== Racial and ethnic composition ===
Sullivan County, Pennsylvania – Racial and ethnic composition Note: the US Census treats Hispanic/Latino as an ethnic category. This table excludes Latinos from the racial categories and assigns them to a separate category. Hispanics/Latinos may be of any race.
| Race / Ethnicity (NH = Non-Hispanic) | Pop 1980 | Pop 1990 | Pop 2000 | Pop 2010 | Pop 2020 | % 1980 | % 1990 | % 2000 | % 2010 | % 2020 |
|---|---|---|---|---|---|---|---|---|---|---|
| White alone (NH) | 6,261 | 5,985 | 6,239 | 6,089 | 5,406 | 98.61% | 98.05% | 95.16% | 94.73% | 92.57% |
| Black or African American alone (NH) | 40 | 56 | 140 | 163 | 77 | 0.63% | 0.92% | 2.14% | 2.54% | 1.32% |
| Native American or Alaska Native alone (NH) | 6 | 29 | 48 | 26 | 9 | 0.09% | 0.48% | 0.73% | 0.40% | 0.15% |
| Asian alone (NH) | 3 | 9 | 9 | 19 | 17 | 0.05% | 0.15% | 0.14% | 0.30% | 0.29% |
| Native Hawaiian or Pacific Islander alone (NH) | x | x | 0 | 0 | 0 | x | x | 0.00% | 0.00% | 0.00% |
| Other race alone (NH) | 4 | 0 | 1 | 0 | 29 | 0.06% | 0.00% | 0.02% | 0.00% | 0.50% |
| Mixed race or Multiracial (NH) | x | x | 47 | 39 | 197 | x | x | 0.72% | 0.61% | 3.37% |
| Hispanic or Latino (any race) | 35 | 25 | 72 | 92 | 105 | 0.55% | 0.41% | 1.10% | 1.43% | 1.80% |
| Total | 6,349 | 6,104 | 6,556 | 6,428 | 5,840 | 100.00% | 100.00% | 100.00% | 100.00% | 100.00% |

=== 2020 census ===
As of the 2020 census, the county had a population of 5,840. The median age was 53.2 years. 16.8% of residents were under the age of 18 and 29.0% of residents were 65 years of age or older. For every 100 females there were 106.2 males, and for every 100 females age 18 and over there were 103.9 males age 18 and over.

The racial makeup of the county was 93.1% White, 1.5% Black or African American, 0.2% American Indian and Alaska Native, 0.3% Asian, <0.1% Native Hawaiian and Pacific Islander, 0.9% from some other race, and 4.0% from two or more races. Hispanic or Latino residents of any race comprised 1.8% of the population.

<0.1% of residents lived in urban areas, while 100.0% lived in rural areas.

There were 2,552 households in the county, of which 20.6% had children under the age of 18 living in them. Of all households, 49.9% were married-couple households, 21.3% were households with a male householder and no spouse or partner present, and 22.5% were households with a female householder and no spouse or partner present. About 32.8% of all households were made up of individuals and 17.7% had someone living alone who was 65 years of age or older.

There were 5,574 housing units, of which 54.2% were vacant. Among occupied housing units, 82.1% were owner-occupied and 17.9% were renter-occupied. The homeowner vacancy rate was 2.4% and the rental vacancy rate was 10.0%.

=== 2000 census ===
As of the 2000 census, there were 6,556 people, 2,660 households, and 1,752 families residing in the county. The population density was 15 people per square mile (5.8 people/km^{2}). There were 6,017 housing units at an average density of 13 units per square mile (5.0/km^{2}). The racial makeup of the county was 95.58% White, 2.20% Black or African American, 0.76% Native American, 0.15% Asian, 0.46% from other races, and 0.85% from two or more races. 1.10% of the population were Hispanic or Latino of any race. 33.8% were of German, 14.7% Irish, 9.5% English, 7.5% American, 5.9% Polish and 5.6% Italian ancestry.

There were 2,660 households, out of which 24.20% had children under the age of 18 living with them, 54.70% were married couples living together, 6.80% had a female householder with no husband present, and 34.10% were non-families. 29.30% of all households were made up of individuals, and 15.20% had someone living alone who was 65 years of age or older. The average household size was 2.30 and the average family size was 2.81.

In the county, the population was spread out, with 20.80% under the age of 18, 7.90% from 18 to 24, 24.10% from 25 to 44, 25.30% from 45 to 64, and 21.90% who were 65 years of age or older. The median age was 43 years. For every 100 females there were 102.10 males. For every 100 females age 18 and over, there were 100.40 males.

== Politics and government ==
United States presidential election results for Sullivan County, Pennsylvania
| Year | Republican | | Democratic | | Third party(ies) | |
| Year | No. | % | No. | % | No. | % |
|---|---|---|---|---|---|---|
| 1888 | 946 | 40.95% | 1,260 | 54.55% | 104 | 4.50% |
| 1892 | 873 | 39.08% | 1,266 | 56.67% | 95 | 4.25% |
| 1896 | 1,215 | 46.02% | 1,300 | 49.24% | 125 | 4.73% |
| 1900 | 1,266 | 45.46% | 1,376 | 49.41% | 143 | 5.13% |
| 1904 | 1,429 | 52.04% | 1,188 | 43.26% | 129 | 4.70% |
| 1908 | 1,119 | 47.24% | 1,076 | 45.42% | 174 | 7.34% |
| 1912 | 547 | 26.46% | 912 | 44.12% | 608 | 29.41% |
| 1916 | 888 | 43.96% | 1,037 | 51.34% | 95 | 4.70% |
| 1920 | 1,620 | 57.57% | 1,061 | 37.70% | 133 | 4.73% |
| 1924 | 1,668 | 59.76% | 913 | 32.71% | 210 | 7.52% |
| 1928 | 2,044 | 64.64% | 1,101 | 34.82% | 17 | 0.54% |
| 1932 | 1,457 | 46.77% | 1,602 | 51.43% | 56 | 1.80% |
| 1936 | 2,121 | 54.08% | 1,740 | 44.37% | 61 | 1.56% |
| 1940 | 2,059 | 55.77% | 1,626 | 44.04% | 7 | 0.19% |
| 1944 | 1,858 | 58.15% | 1,329 | 41.60% | 8 | 0.25% |
| 1948 | 1,752 | 61.22% | 1,084 | 37.88% | 26 | 0.91% |
| 1952 | 2,011 | 61.82% | 1,239 | 38.09% | 3 | 0.09% |
| 1956 | 2,007 | 60.87% | 1,286 | 39.01% | 4 | 0.12% |
| 1960 | 1,808 | 55.05% | 1,471 | 44.79% | 5 | 0.15% |
| 1964 | 1,344 | 44.24% | 1,690 | 55.63% | 4 | 0.13% |
| 1968 | 1,629 | 56.76% | 1,035 | 36.06% | 206 | 7.18% |
| 1972 | 1,886 | 67.17% | 885 | 31.52% | 37 | 1.32% |
| 1976 | 1,584 | 53.68% | 1,347 | 45.65% | 20 | 0.68% |
| 1980 | 1,676 | 57.75% | 1,074 | 37.01% | 152 | 5.24% |
| 1984 | 1,926 | 66.67% | 952 | 32.95% | 11 | 0.38% |
| 1988 | 1,808 | 61.88% | 1,091 | 37.34% | 23 | 0.79% |
| 1992 | 1,340 | 43.05% | 1,030 | 33.09% | 743 | 23.87% |
| 1996 | 1,352 | 47.31% | 1,071 | 37.47% | 435 | 15.22% |
| 2000 | 1,928 | 62.09% | 1,066 | 34.33% | 111 | 3.57% |
| 2004 | 2,056 | 62.59% | 1,213 | 36.93% | 16 | 0.49% |
| 2008 | 1,841 | 58.89% | 1,233 | 39.44% | 52 | 1.66% |
| 2012 | 1,868 | 63.34% | 1,034 | 35.06% | 47 | 1.59% |
| 2016 | 2,291 | 72.68% | 750 | 23.79% | 111 | 3.52% |
| 2020 | 2,619 | 72.79% | 921 | 25.60% | 58 | 1.61% |
| 2024 | 2,721 | 72.95% | 976 | 26.17% | 33 | 0.88% |

United States Senate election results for Sullivan County, Pennsylvania1
| Year | Republican | | Democratic | | Third party(ies) | |
| Year | No. | % | No. | % | No. | % |
|---|---|---|---|---|---|---|
| 1994 | 1,363 | 55.93% | 977 | 40.09% | 97 | 3.98% |
| 2000 | 2,046 | 67.86% | 897 | 29.75% | 72 | 2.39% |
| 2006 | 1,351 | 53.36% | 1,181 | 46.64% | 0 | 0.00% |
| 2012 | 1,803 | 61.64% | 1,050 | 35.90% | 72 | 2.46% |
| 2018 | 1,720 | 63.00% | 962 | 35.24% | 48 | 1.76% |
| 2024 | 2,612 | 70.31% | 1,021 | 27.48% | 82 | 2.21% |

United States Senate election results for Sullivan County, Pennsylvania3
| Year | Republican | | Democratic | | Third party(ies) | |
| Year | No. | % | No. | % | No. | % |
|---|---|---|---|---|---|---|
| 1992 | 1,585 | 51.43% | 1,334 | 43.28% | 163 | 5.29% |
| 1998 | 1,583 | 69.16% | 651 | 28.44% | 55 | 2.40% |
| 2004 | 2,022 | 65.56% | 907 | 29.41% | 155 | 5.03% |
| 2010 | 1,561 | 67.43% | 754 | 32.57% | 0 | 0.00% |
| 2016 | 2,020 | 65.31% | 867 | 28.03% | 206 | 6.66% |
| 2022 | 2,023 | 67.08% | 869 | 28.81% | 124 | 4.11% |

Pennsylvania Gubernatorial election results for Sullivan County
| Year | Republican | | Democratic | | Third party(ies) | |
| Year | No. | % | No. | % | No. | % |
|---|---|---|---|---|---|---|
| 1970 | 1,466 | 57.67% | 1,009 | 39.69% | 67 | 2.64% |
| 1974 | 1,546 | 58.54% | 1,085 | 41.08% | 10 | 0.38% |
| 1978 | 1,482 | 61.06% | 936 | 38.57% | 9 | 0.37% |
| 1982 | 1,332 | 52.77% | 1,187 | 47.03% | 5 | 0.20% |
| 1986 | 1,263 | 51.13% | 1,194 | 48.34% | 13 | 0.53% |
| 1990 | 835 | 40.89% | 1,207 | 59.11% | 0 | 0.00% |
| 1994 | 1,480 | 60.11% | 787 | 31.97% | 195 | 7.92% |
| 1998 | 1,609 | 69.62% | 524 | 22.67% | 178 | 7.70% |
| 2002 | 1,441 | 61.06% | 856 | 36.27% | 63 | 2.67% |
| 2006 | 1,275 | 50.22% | 1,264 | 49.78% | 0 | 0.00% |
| 2010 | 1,654 | 70.80% | 682 | 29.20% | 0 | 0.00% |
| 2014 | 1,325 | 63.01% | 778 | 36.99% | 0 | 0.00% |
| 2018 | 1,661 | 61.54% | 977 | 36.20% | 61 | 2.26% |
| 2022 | 1,923 | 63.61% | 1,024 | 33.87% | 76 | 2.51% |

As of August 8, 2022, there are 4,369 registered voters in Sullivan County.

- Republican: 2,659 (60.86%)
- Democratic: 1,222 (27.97%)
- Independent: 322 (7.37%)
- Third Party: 166 (3.80%)

=== Law enforcement ===
As of 2016 all areas in the county use the Pennsylvania State Police (PSP) in a law enforcement capacity, either with part-time police departments or with no other police departments.

=== County commissioners ===
- Brian Hoffman, Chair, Republican
- Darlene Fenton, Vice-chair Republican
- Scott Myers, Democrat

=== Other county offices ===
- District Attorney, Julie Gavitt-Shaffer, Republican
- Prothonotary, Register of Wills & Recorder of Deeds, Kellie Carpenter, Democrat
- Sheriff, Nicholas Wingate, Republican
- Treasurer, Katrina Wilkins, Republican
- Coroner, Wendy Hastings, Republican

=== State Representative ===
- Joseph Hamm, Republican, 84th district

=== State Senator ===
- Gene Yaw, Republican, 23rd district

=== United States House of Representatives ===
- Dan Meuser, Republican, Pennsylvania's 9th congressional district

=== United States Senator ===
- Dave McCormick, Republican
- John Fetterman, Democrat

== Education ==
There is one school district in the county: Sullivan County School District. Sullivan County School District has one high school, grades 7–12, and one elementary school, grades K-6. Sullivan County High School is located in Laporte. Sullivan County Elementary School is located just behind the high school.

== Transportation ==
Public transportation is provided by BeST Transit.

Sullivan County is one of only two counties in Pennsylvania with no known active railroad lines of any kind, the other being Fulton County. However, several narrow-gauge logging railroads once served Sullivan County.

=== Major roads ===
- US 220
- PA 42
- PA 87
- PA 154
- PA 487

== Recreation ==
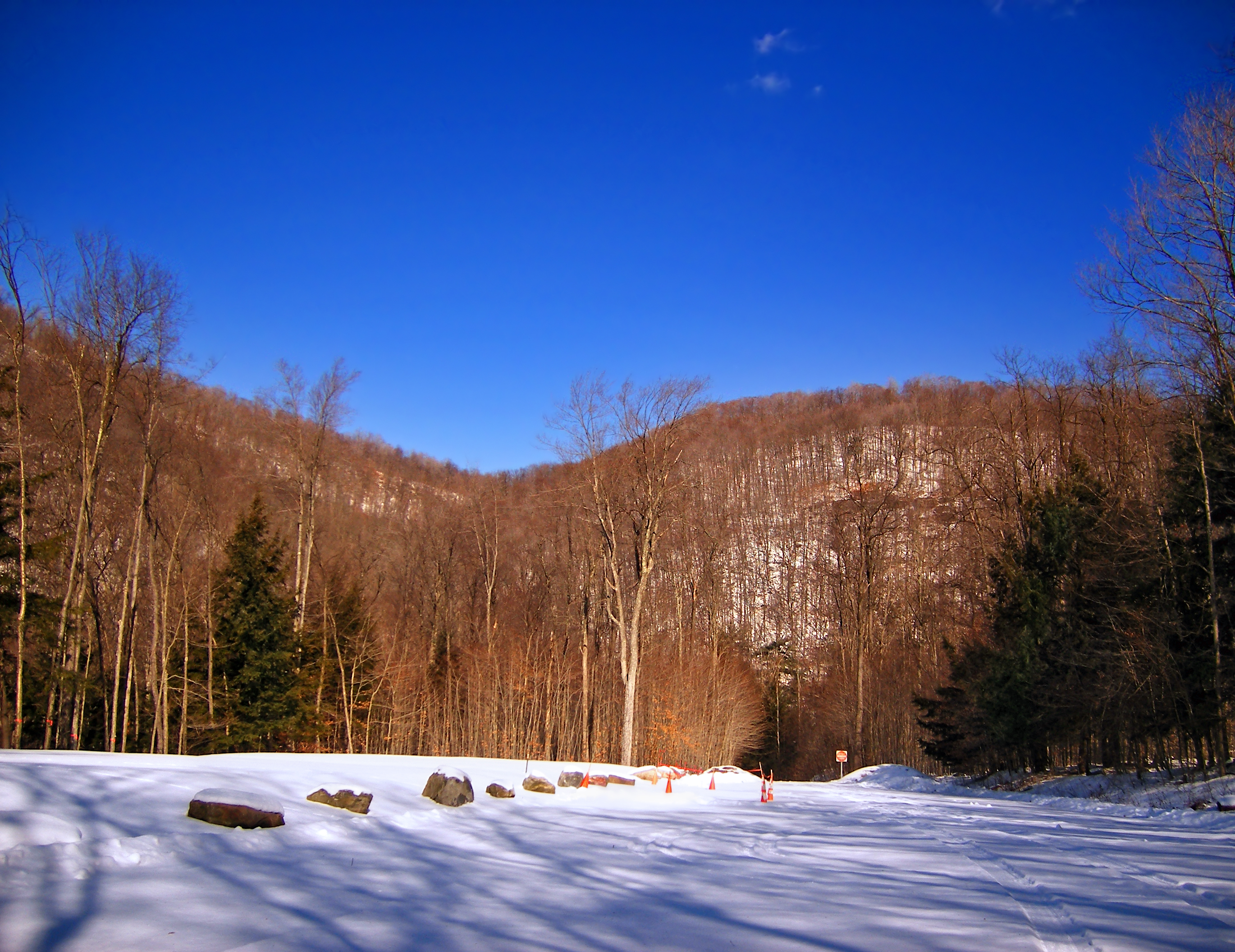
Loyalsock State Forest in Hillsgrove Township

There are two Pennsylvania state parks in Sullivan County.

- Part of Ricketts Glen State Park is in the eastern portion of the county.
- Worlds End State Park is near Forksville on Loyalsock Creek.

Sullivan County is also home to a large, private hunting club, Painter Den, Inc. This vast property is situated in Davidson, Laporte and Colley townships. Painter Den Pond is also on the property and is stocked with perch and pike.

=== Annual events ===
There are several festivities held in the county each year:

- Dushore Dairy Parade, held in mid-June, features cow milking.
- Dushore Founder's Day, held in August, features activities such as Outhouse Races, Roll-a-Keg Races, Arts and Crafts, and vendors.
- Laporte Fireman's Carnival, held in July, features carnival rides and games.
- Sullivan County Fair, held in late August and early September, features carnival rides and games, exhibitions, competitions, a demolition derby, and vendors.
- Endless Mountains Grand Depart, held each September, invites cyclists to ride or race one of three bikepacking routes through the Endless Mountains region. Cyclists can choose to ride either the 115-, 250-, or 430-mile route alone or in a pair.
- Sullivan County Bowfest, held in mid to late September

== Communities ==
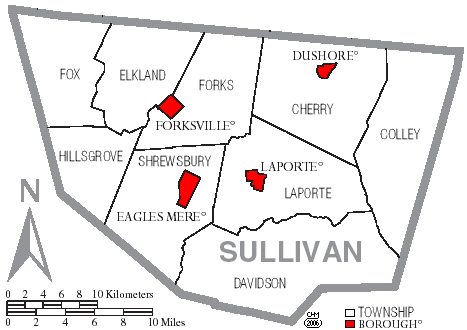
Map of Sullivan County, Pennsylvania with Municipal Labels showing Boroughs (red) and Townships (white).

Under Pennsylvania law, there are four types of incorporated municipalities: cities, boroughs, townships, and, in at most two cases, towns. The following boroughs and townships are located in Sullivan County:

=== Boroughs ===
- Dushore
- Eagles Mere
- Forksville
- Laporte (county seat)

=== Townships ===
- Cherry
- Colley
- Davidson
- Elkland
- Forks
- Fox
- Hillsgrove
- Laporte
- Shrewsbury

=== Unincorporated communities ===
- Bedford Corners
- Beech Glen
- Bernice
- Bethel
- Campbellville
- Cherry Mills
- Colley
- Coveytown
- Eagles Mere Park
- Eldredsville
- Elk Grove (partly in Columbia County)
- Elkland Meeting House
- Emmons
- Estella
- Foley Corner
- Hemlock Grove
- Hillsgrove
- Hugos Corner
- Kinsley Corners
- Lincoln Falls
- Long Brook
- Lopez
- Maple Summit
- McCaroll Corner
- Mildred
- Millview
- Muncy Valley
- Murray
- Nordmont
- Ogdonia
- Ricketts
- Ringdale
- Satterfield
- Shinerville
- Shunk
- Sonestown
- Summit
- Tompkins Corners
- Wheelerville
- Wissingers

=== Population ranking ===
The population ranking of the following table is based on the 2010 census of Sullivan County.

† county seat

| Rank | City/Town/etc. | Municipal type | Population (2010 Census) |
|---|---|---|---|
| 1 | Dushore | Borough | 608 |
| 2 | Laporte † | Borough | 316 |
| 3 | Forksville | Borough | 145 |
| 4 | Eagles Mere | Borough | 120 |

== See also ==
- National Register of Historic Places listings in Sullivan County, Pennsylvania
