= 1900 United States presidential election in Pennsylvania =

- November 6, 1900
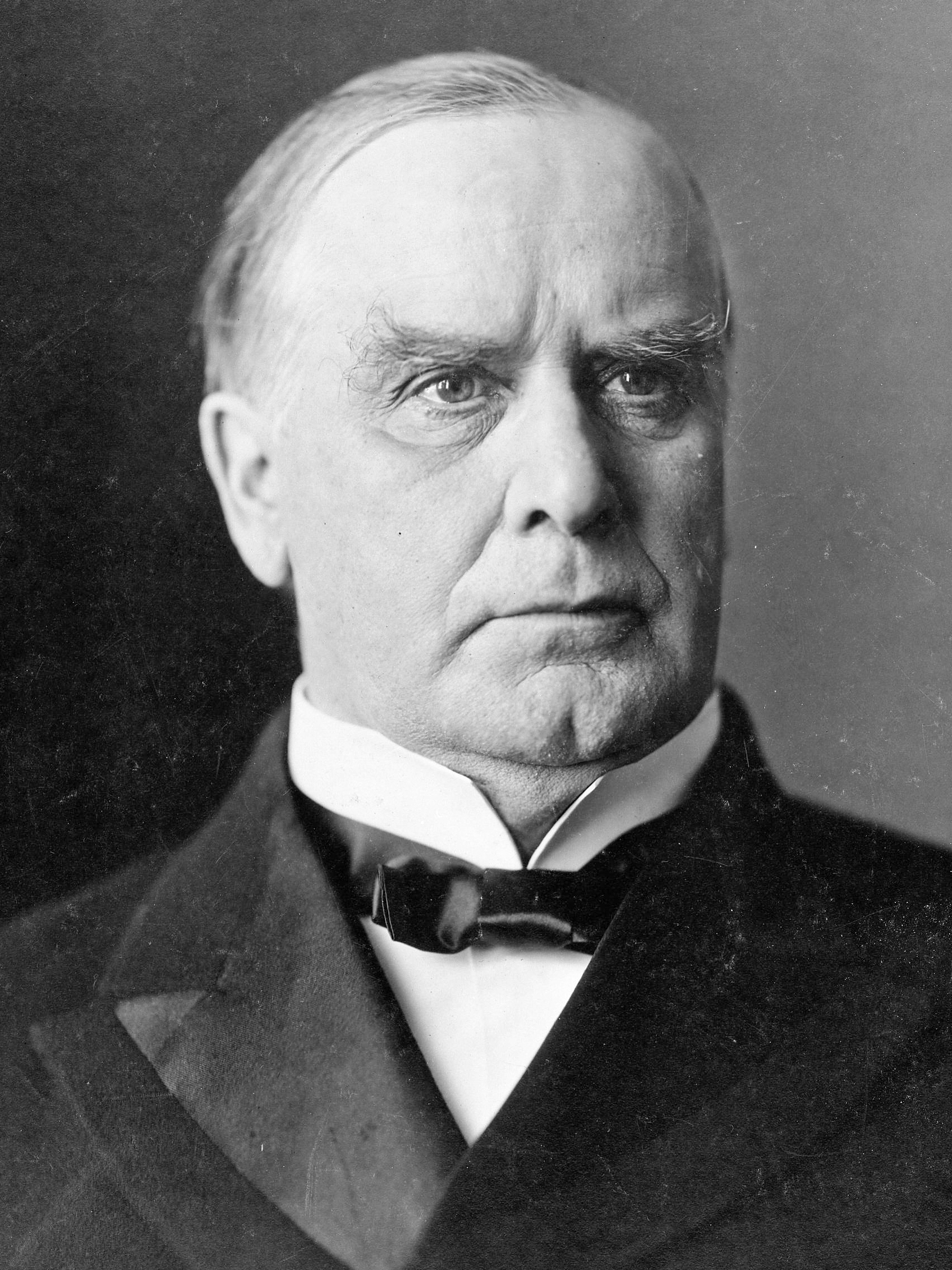

Nominee	William McKinley	William Jennings Bryan
Party	Republican	Democratic
Home state	Ohio	Nebraska
Running mate	Theodore Roosevelt	Adlai Stevenson I
Electoral vote	32	0
Popular vote	712,665	424,232
Percentage	60.74%	36.16%
County results
McKinley
40–50%
50–60%
60–70%
70–80%
Bryan
40–50%
50–60%
60–70%
President before election
William McKinley
Republican
Elected President
William McKinley
Republican

A presidential election was held in Pennsylvania on November 6, 1900, as part of the 1900 United States presidential election. Voters selected 32 representatives, or electors to the Electoral College, who voted for president and vice president.

Pennsylvania voted for the Republican nominee, President William McKinley, over the Democratic nominee, former U.S. Representative and 1896 Democratic presidential nominee William Jennings Bryan. McKinley won Pennsylvania by a landslide margin of 24.31% in this rematch of the 1896 United States presidential election. The return of economic prosperity and recent victory in the Spanish–American War helped McKinley to score a decisive victory.

With 60.74% of the popular vote, Pennsylvania was McKinley's fourth-strongest victory in terms of percentage in the popular vote following Vermont, North Dakota and Maine.

Bryan previously lost Pennsylvania to McKinley four years earlier and would later lose the state again in 1908 to William Howard Taft.

== Results ==
1900 United States presidential election in Pennsylvania
Party	Candidate	Votes	Percentage	Electoral votes
Republican	William McKinley (incumbent)	712,665	60.74%	32
Democratic	William Jennings Bryan	424,232	36.16%	0
Prohibition	John G. Woolley	27,908	2.38%	0
Socialist	Eugene V. Debs	4,831	0.41%	0
Socialist Labor	Joseph F. Maloney	2,936	0.25%	0
People's	Wharton Barker	638	0.05%	0
Totals		1,173,210	100.00%	35

=== Results by county ===
County	William McKinley Republican		William Jennings Bryan Democratic		Various candidates Other parties		Margin		Total votes cast
County	#	%	#	%	#	%	#	%	Total votes cast
Adams	3,718	47.47%	3,967	50.65%	147	1.88%	-249	-3.18%	7,832
Allegheny	71,780	69.94%	27,311	26.61%	3,533	3.44%	44,469	43.33%	102,624
Armstrong	6,443	63.58%	3,438	33.93%	252	2.49%	3,005	29.66%	10,133
Beaver	6,759	60.11%	4,076	36.25%	409	3.64%	2,683	23.86%	11,244
Bedford	4,790	57.24%	3,445	41.17%	133	1.59%	1,345	16.07%	8,368
Berks	13,952	41.53%	19,013	56.60%	628	1.87%	-5,061	-15.07%	33,593
Blair	9,749	65.81%	4,528	30.57%	537	3.62%	5,221	35.24%	14,814
Bradford	8,625	64.05%	4,211	31.27%	631	4.69%	4,414	32.78%	13,467
Bucks	9,263	55.13%	7,287	43.37%	253	1.51%	1,976	11.76%	16,803
Butler	6,303	55.85%	4,465	39.57%	517	4.58%	1,838	16.29%	11,285
Cambria	10,476	57.99%	7,168	39.68%	420	2.33%	3,308	18.31%	18,064
Cameron	971	63.59%	514	33.66%	42	2.75%	457	29.93%	1,527
Carbon	4,222	48.81%	4,149	47.97%	278	3.21%	73	0.84%	8,649
Centre	4,684	50.64%	4,339	46.91%	226	2.44%	345	3.73%	9,249
Chester	13,809	66.20%	6,214	29.79%	835	4.00%	7,595	36.41%	20,858
Clarion	3,002	44.69%	3,472	51.68%	244	3.63%	-470	-7.00%	6,718
Clearfield	7,955	53.55%	6,066	40.84%	833	5.61%	1,889	12.72%	14,854
Clinton	3,157	50.58%	2,879	46.13%	205	3.28%	278	4.45%	6,241
Columbia	2,954	35.21%	4,982	59.38%	454	5.41%	-2,028	-24.17%	8,390
Crawford	7,705	49.97%	7,000	45.40%	713	4.62%	705	4.57%	15,418
Cumberland	5,587	49.06%	5,428	47.66%	374	3.28%	159	1.40%	11,389
Dauphin	14,673	64.23%	7,390	32.35%	783	3.43%	7,283	31.88%	22,846
Delaware	13,794	74.96%	4,249	23.09%	358	1.95%	9,545	51.87%	18,401
Elk	3,254	50.06%	3,105	47.77%	141	2.17%	149	2.29%	6,500
Erie	11,816	58.47%	7,281	36.03%	1,110	5.49%	4,535	22.44%	20,207
Fayette	9,637	53.54%	7,650	42.50%	712	3.96%	1,987	11.04%	17,999
Forest	1,309	61.25%	714	33.41%	114	5.33%	595	27.84%	2,137
Franklin	6,483	57.98%	4,500	40.24%	199	1.78%	1,983	17.73%	11,182
Fulton	1,039	45.27%	1,224	53.33%	32	1.39%	-185	-8.06%	2,295
Greene	2,427	39.02%	3,674	59.07%	119	1.91%	-1,247	-20.05%	6,220
Huntingdon	4,645	67.91%	1,989	29.08%	206	3.01%	2,656	38.83%	6,840
Indiana	5,687	72.25%	1,767	22.45%	417	5.30%	3,920	49.80%	7,871
Jefferson	5,950	62.38%	3,063	32.11%	525	5.50%	2,887	30.27%	9,538
Juniata	1,805	51.50%	1,621	46.25%	79	2.25%	184	5.25%	3,505
Lackawanna	16,763	51.56%	14,728	45.30%	1,019	3.13%	2,035	6.26%	32,510
Lancaster	23,230	71.77%	8,437	26.07%	701	2.17%	14,793	45.70%	32,368
Lawrence	6,343	61.39%	2,754	26.66%	1,235	11.95%	3,589	34.74%	10,332
Lebanon	7,089	66.76%	3,050	28.72%	479	4.51%	4,039	38.04%	10,618
Lehigh	9,775	47.64%	10,438	50.87%	304	1.48%	-663	-3.23%	20,517
Luzerne	21,793	54.87%	16,470	41.47%	1,454	3.66%	5,323	13.40%	39,717
Lycoming	7,750	47.53%	7,427	45.55%	1,127	6.91%	323	1.98%	16,304
McKean	6,319	61.39%	3,427	33.29%	547	5.31%	2,892	28.10%	10,293
Mercer	6,950	55.94%	4,916	39.57%	559	4.50%	2,034	16.37%	12,425
Mifflin	2,594	56.48%	1,842	40.10%	157	3.42%	752	16.37%	4,593
Monroe	1,264	27.99%	3,054	67.63%	198	4.38%	-1,790	-39.64%	4,516
Montgomery	17,051	59.10%	11,208	38.85%	590	2.05%	5,843	20.25%	28,849
Montour	1,292	39.89%	1,875	57.89%	72	2.22%	-583	-18.00%	3,239
Northampton	9,849	45.14%	11,412	52.31%	556	2.55%	-1,563	-7.16%	21,817
Northumberland	8,366	49.35%	7,989	47.13%	596	3.52%	377	2.22%	16,951
Perry	3,400	57.41%	2,440	41.20%	82	1.38%	960	16.21%	5,922
Philadelphia	173,657	73.93%	58,179	24.77%	3,053	1.30%	115,478	49.16%	234,889
Pike	694	35.30%	1,236	62.87%	36	1.83%	-542	-27.57%	1,966
Potter	3,224	56.29%	2,147	37.49%	356	6.22%	1,077	18.81%	5,727
Schuylkill	15,327	50.73%	14,496	47.98%	392	1.30%	831	2.75%	30,215
Snyder	2,517	64.85%	1,319	33.99%	45	1.16%	1,198	30.87%	3,881
Somerset	6,677	73.30%	2,151	23.61%	281	3.08%	4,526	49.69%	9,109
Sullivan	1,266	45.46%	1,376	49.41%	143	5.13%	-110	-3.95%	2,785
Susquehanna	5,019	55.24%	3,527	38.82%	539	5.93%	1,492	16.42%	9,085
Tioga	7,458	71.02%	2,638	25.12%	406	3.87%	4,820	45.90%	10,502
Union	2,810	65.82%	1,359	31.83%	100	2.34%	1,451	33.99%	4,269
Venango	5,931	52.75%	4,014	35.70%	1,299	11.55%	1,917	17.05%	11,244
Warren	5,609	64.88%	2,500	28.92%	536	6.20%	3,109	35.96%	8,645
Washington	10,408	59.40%	6,380	36.41%	733	4.18%	4,028	22.99%	17,521
Wayne	3,229	50.91%	2,647	41.74%	466	7.35%	582	9.18%	6,342
Westmoreland	16,014	57.00%	11,010	39.19%	1,072	3.82%	5,004	17.81%	28,096
Wyoming	2,247	52.61%	1,875	43.90%	149	3.49%	372	8.71%	4,271
York	12,327	46.29%	13,732	51.56%	572	2.15%	-1,405	-5.28%	26,631
Totals	712,665	60.74%	424,232	36.16%	36,313	3.10%	288,433	24.58%	1,173,210

== See also ==
- United States presidential elections in Pennsylvania
