= 1896 United States presidential election in Pennsylvania =

- November 3, 1896

Nominee	William McKinley	William Jennings Bryan
Party	Republican	Democratic
Alliance		Populist; Silver
Home state	Ohio	Nebraska
Running mate	Garret Hobart	Arthur Sewall
Electoral vote	32	0
Popular vote	728,300	433,228
Percentage	60.98%	36.27%
County results
McKinley
40–50%
50–60%
60–70%
70–80%
Bryan
40–50%
50–60%
60–70%
President before election
Grover Cleveland
Democratic
Elected President
William McKinley
Republican

A presidential election was held in Pennsylvania on November 3, 1896, as part of the 1896 United States presidential election. Voters chose 32 representatives, or electors to the Electoral College, who voted for president and vice president.

Pennsylvania overwhelmingly voted for the Republican nominee, former Governor of Ohio William McKinley, over the Democratic nominee, former U.S. Representative from Nebraska William Jennings Bryan. McKinley won Pennsylvania by a landslide margin of 24.71%.

Bryan would lose Pennsylvania to McKinley again four years later and would later lose the state again in 1908 to William Howard Taft.

== Results ==
1896 United States presidential election in Pennsylvania
Party	Candidate	Votes	Percentage	Electoral votes
Republican	William McKinley	728,300	60.98%	32
Democratic	William Jennings Bryan	422,054	35.34%	0
Populist	William Jennings Bryan	6,103	0.51%	0
Silver	William Jennings Bryan	5,071	0.42%	0
Total	William Jennings Bryan	433,228	36.27%	0
Prohibition	Joshua Levering	19,274	1.61%	0
National Democratic	John M. Palmer	11,000	0.92%	0
Socialist Labor	Charles H. Matchett	1,683	0.14%	0
National Prohibition	Charles Eugene Bentley	870	0.07%	0
Totals		1,172,355	100.00%	32

=== Results by county ===
County	William McKinley Republican		William Jennings Bryan Democratic		Joshua Levering Prohibition		John M. Palmer National Democratic		Various candidates Other parties		Margin		Total votes cast
County	#	%	#	%	#	%	#	%	#	%	#	%	Total votes cast
Adams	4,170	50.95%	3,794	46.35%	101	1.23%	98	1.20%	2	0.02%	376	4.59%	8,185
Allegheny	76,691	70.90%	28,782	26.61%	930	0.86%	452	0.42%	292	0.27%	47,909	44.29%	108,174
Armstrong	6,325	61.12%	3,796	36.68%	168	1.62%	22	0.21%	9	0.09%	2,529	24.44%	10,349
Beaver	6,842	59.95%	4,040	35.40%	202	1.77%	37	0.32%	9	0.08%	2,802	24.55%	11,412
Bedford	4,983	57.17%	3,582	41.10%	73	0.84%	47	0.54%	8	0.09%	1,401	16.07%	8,716
Berks	14,318	43.28%	18,099	54.71%	233	0.70%	416	1.26%	16	0.05%	-3,781	-11.43%	33,082
Blair	10,382	65.50%	4,775	30.12%	385	2.43%	167	1.05%	77	0.49%	5,607	35.37%	15,851
Bradford	9,422	66.04%	4,388	30.76%	381	2.67%	58	0.41%	18	0.13%	5,034	35.28%	14,267
Bucks	9,798	57.61%	6,685	39.31%	197	1.16%	312	1.83%	15	0.09%	3,113	18.30%	17,007
Butler	6,821	55.42%	5,048	41.01%	285	2.32%	26	0.21%	49	0.40%	1,773	14.41%	12,308
Cambria	8,865	55.33%	6,665	41.60%	211	1.32%	81	0.51%	22	0.14%	2,200	13.73%	16,022
Cameron	925	59.60%	566	36.47%	41	2.64%	9	0.58%	2	0.13%	359	23.13%	1,552
Carbon	4,534	53.93%	3,584	42.63%	127	1.51%	130	1.55%	7	0.08%	950	11.30%	8,407
Centre	4,880	49.93%	4,531	46.36%	251	2.57%	93	0.95%	4	0.04%	349	3.57%	9,774
Chester	14,232	67.80%	6,041	28.78%	368	1.75%	246	1.17%	86	0.41%	8,191	39.02%	20,990
Clarion	3,338	43.57%	4,061	53.00%	204	2.66%	20	0.26%	3	0.04%	-723	-9.44%	7,662
Clearfield	7,395	50.97%	6,370	43.91%	555	3.83%	91	0.63%	7	0.05%	1,025	7.07%	14,508
Clinton	3,486	51.23%	3,051	44.84%	158	2.32%	104	1.53%	3	0.04%	435	6.39%	6,804
Columbia	3,280	37.77%	4,888	56.29%	418	4.81%	77	0.89%	5	0.06%	-1,608	-18.52%	8,684
Crawford	7,851	47.26%	8,383	50.47%	285	1.72%	50	0.30%	42	0.25%	-532	-3.20%	16,611
Cumberland	6,178	52.30%	5,187	43.91%	324	2.74%	102	0.86%	6	0.05%	991	8.39%	11,812
Dauphin	14,752	66.84%	6,510	29.50%	466	2.11%	263	1.19%	4	0.02%	8,242	37.35%	22,069
Delaware	13,979	75.27%	4,161	22.40%	184	0.99%	184	0.99%	56	0.30%	9,818	52.86%	18,572
Elk	2,807	49.57%	2,707	47.80%	87	1.54%	44	0.78%	8	0.14%	100	1.77%	5,663
Erie	11,819	54.74%	8,695	40.27%	336	1.56%	193	0.89%	34	0.16%	3,124	14.47%	21,592
Fayette	9,268	51.33%	8,301	45.98%	355	1.97%	60	0.33%	23	0.13%	967	5.36%	18,055
Forest	1,224	57.74%	805	37.97%	85	4.01%	6	0.28%	0	0.00%	419	19.76%	2,120
Franklin	6,747	58.81%	4,414	38.48%	158	1.38%	139	1.21%	3	0.03%	2,333	20.34%	11,472
Fulton	1,083	45.83%	1,240	52.48%	24	1.02%	8	0.34%	2	0.08%	-157	-6.64%	2,363
Greene	2,453	36.41%	4,144	61.51%	61	0.91%	20	0.30%	5	0.07%	-1,691	-25.10%	6,737
Huntingdon	4,969	66.06%	2,203	29.29%	150	1.99%	97	1.29%	1	0.01%	2,766	36.77%	7,522
Indiana	5,818	66.11%	2,201	25.01%	186	2.11%	27	0.31%	18	0.20%	3,617	41.10%	8,801
Jefferson	5,500	57.18%	3,545	36.85%	407	4.23%	35	0.36%	6	0.06%	1,955	20.32%	9,619
Juniata	2,059	52.03%	1,810	45.74%	44	1.11%	35	0.88%	0	0.00%	249	6.29%	3,957
Lackawanna	18,737	59.28%	11,826	37.42%	808	2.56%	112	0.35%	75	0.24%	6,911	21.87%	31,605
Lancaster	24,337	72.67%	8,145	24.32%	479	1.43%	498	1.49%	31	0.09%	16,192	48.35%	33,490
Lawrence	6,228	65.13%	2,836	29.66%	285	2.98%	13	0.14%	23	0.24%	3,392	35.47%	9,562
Lebanon	7,288	70.60%	2,796	27.09%	213	2.06%	0	0.00%	7	0.07%	4,492	43.51%	10,323
Lehigh	9,507	48.90%	9,359	48.14%	206	1.06%	325	1.67%	36	0.19%	148	0.76%	19,443
Luzerne	22,718	55.08%	17,163	41.61%	810	1.96%	304	0.74%	111	0.27%	5,555	13.47%	41,248
Lycoming	8,097	48.58%	7,256	43.53%	1,031	6.19%	167	1.00%	33	0.20%	841	5.05%	16,668
McKean	5,077	59.59%	2,921	34.28%	308	3.62%	55	0.65%	6	0.07%	2,156	25.31%	8,520
Mercer	7,262	55.53%	5,500	42.06%	270	2.06%	31	0.24%	14	0.11%	1,762	13.47%	13,077
Mifflin	2,662	54.22%	2,048	41.71%	118	2.40%	76	1.55%	2	0.04%	614	12.51%	4,910
Monroe	1,447	31.80%	2,881	63.30%	133	2.92%	79	1.74%	5	0.11%	-1,434	-31.51%	4,551
Montgomery	17,329	61.25%	9,985	35.29%	333	1.18%	606	2.14%	41	0.14%	7,344	25.96%	28,294
Montour	1,384	42.65%	1,733	53.41%	58	1.79%	56	1.73%	0	0.00%	-349	-10.76%	3,245
Northampton	9,762	47.59%	10,032	48.91%	326	1.59%	360	1.76%	31	0.15%	-270	-1.32%	20,511
Northumberland	8,659	51.68%	7,332	43.76%	574	3.43%	120	0.72%	36	0.21%	1,327	7.92%	16,756
Perry	3,537	57.23%	2,464	39.87%	106	1.72%	54	0.87%	6	0.10%	1,073	17.36%	6,180
Philadelphia	176,462	72.06%	63,323	25.86%	993	0.41%	3,115	1.27%	994	0.41%	113,139	46.20%	244,887
Pike	778	40.10%	1,120	57.73%	11	0.57%	25	1.29%	3	0.15%	-342	-17.63%	1,940
Potter	3,281	55.83%	2,079	35.38%	118	2.01%	28	0.48%	4	0.07%	1,202	20.45%	5,877
Schuylkill	17,045	52.60%	14,671	45.27%	244	0.75%	359	1.11%	14	0.04%	2,374	7.33%	32,407
Snyder	2,572	64.66%	1,330	33.43%	32	0.80%	23	0.58%	0	0.00%	1,242	31.22%	3,978
Somerset	5,861	70.45%	2,277	27.37%	147	1.77%	14	0.17%	2	0.02%	3,584	43.08%	8,319
Sullivan	1,215	46.02%	1,282	48.56%	92	3.48%	29	1.10%	4	0.15%	-67	-2.54%	2,640
Susquehanna	5,310	56.73%	3,421	36.55%	386	4.12%	36	0.38%	10	0.11%	1,889	20.18%	9,360
Tioga	7,922	71.42%	2,360	21.28%	258	2.33%	72	0.65%	12	0.11%	5,562	50.14%	11,092
Union	2,585	65.63%	1,134	28.79%	114	2.89%	54	1.37%	0	0.00%	1,451	36.84%	3,939
Venango	5,133	49.82%	4,380	42.51%	531	5.15%	32	0.31%	9	0.09%	753	7.31%	10,304
Warren	4,846	58.70%	3,048	36.92%	312	3.78%	32	0.39%	17	0.21%	1,798	21.78%	8,255
Washington	10,798	57.93%	7,245	38.87%	348	1.87%	83	0.45%	27	0.14%	3,553	19.06%	18,640
Wayne	3,708	56.59%	2,459	37.53%	345	5.27%	21	0.32%	5	0.08%	1,249	19.06%	6,552
Westmoreland	14,928	56.23%	10,723	40.39%	357	1.34%	90	0.34%	142	0.53%	4,205	15.84%	26,546
Wyoming	2,373	53.24%	1,916	42.99%	113	2.54%	17	0.38%	3	0.07%	457	10.25%	4,457
York	12,258	47.04%	13,028	49.99%	375	1.44%	365	1.40%	8	0.03%	-770	-2.95%	26,060
Totals	728,300	60.98%	427,125	35.76%	19,274	1.61%	11,000	0.92%	2,553	0.21%	301,175	25.22%	1,194,355

== See also ==
- United States presidential elections in Pennsylvania
