= Ticklish Rock =

Rock formation in Pennsylvania, United States

Coordinates: 41°21′02″N 76°38′53″W

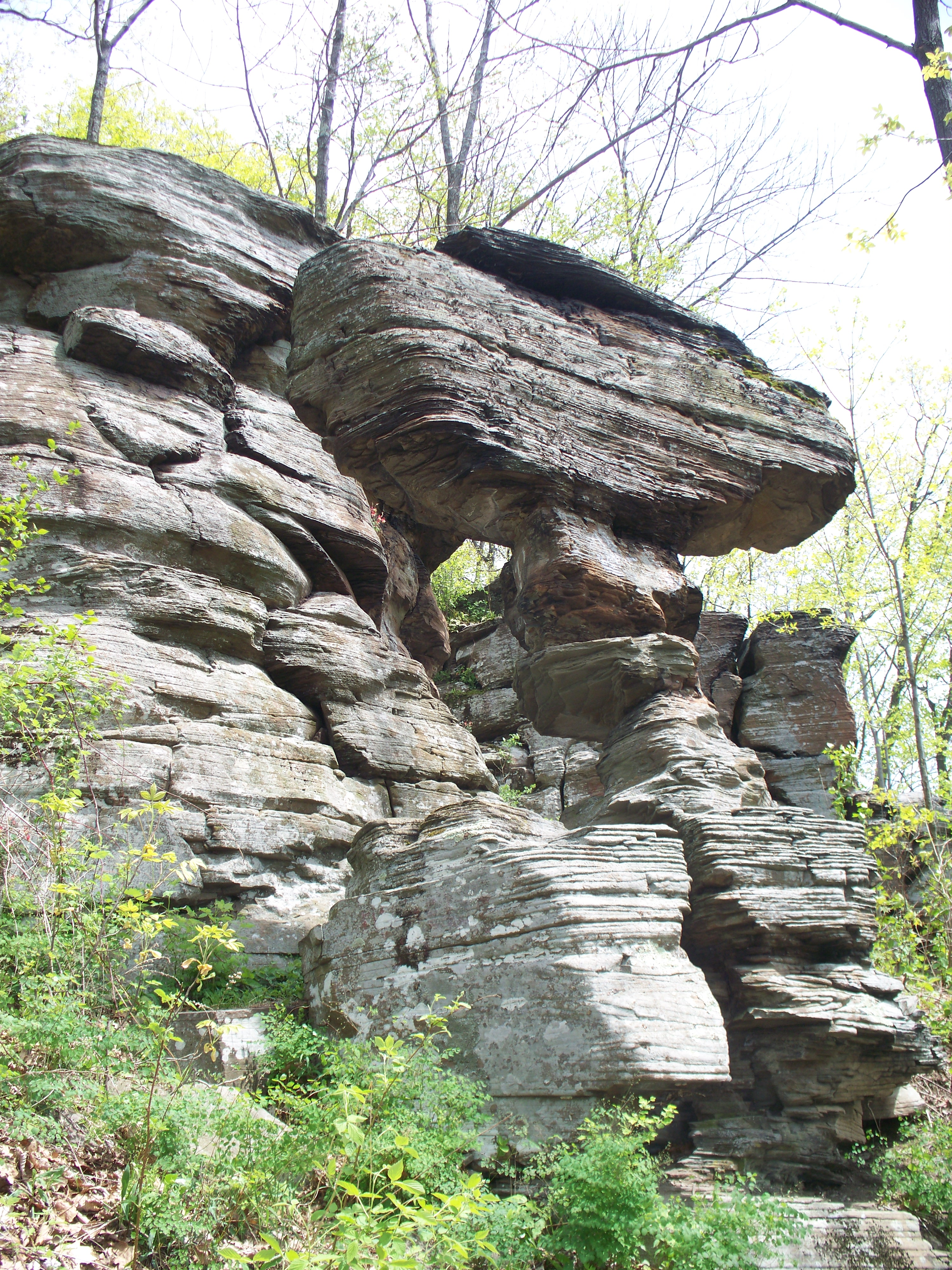
Ticklish Rock, at ground level

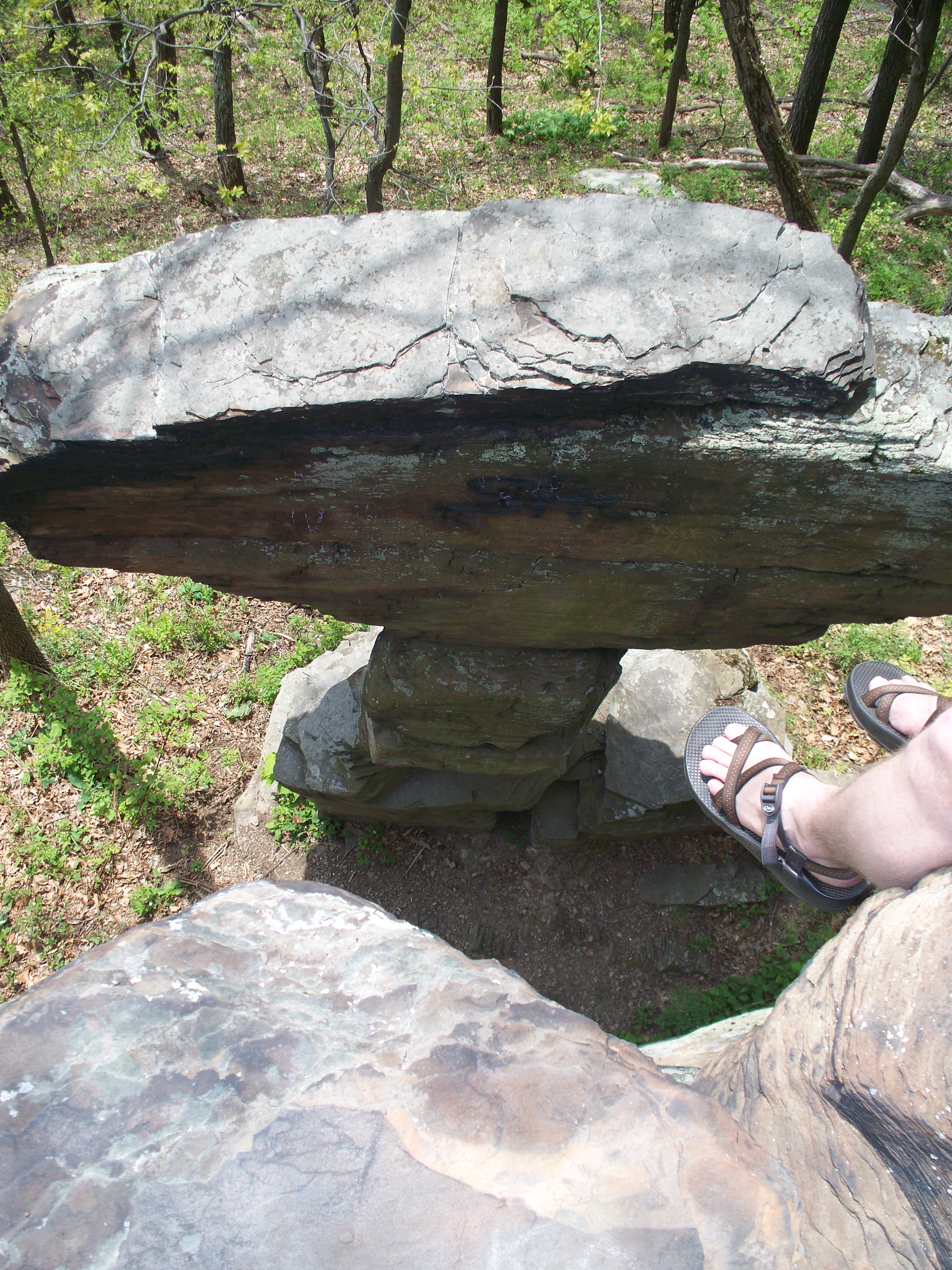
Ticklish Rock, from above

Ticklish Rock is an unusual sandstone rock formation, located in Shrewsbury Township, Sullivan County, Pennsylvania. The brown and green sandstone formation, which stands at the edge of a steep cliff and resembles an upright hammer. It consists of a large horizontal block, 3 feet high, 8 feet long, and 6 feet wide (0.9 x 2.4 x 1.8 m), balanced upon a thin, 18 in × 30 in (46 cm × 76 cm) pedestal.

Ticklish Rock is part of Pennsylvania's Catskill Formation, which was formed during the Devonian period. The outcrop itself is the result of more recent uneven weathering, which removed all but the pedestal from under the block.

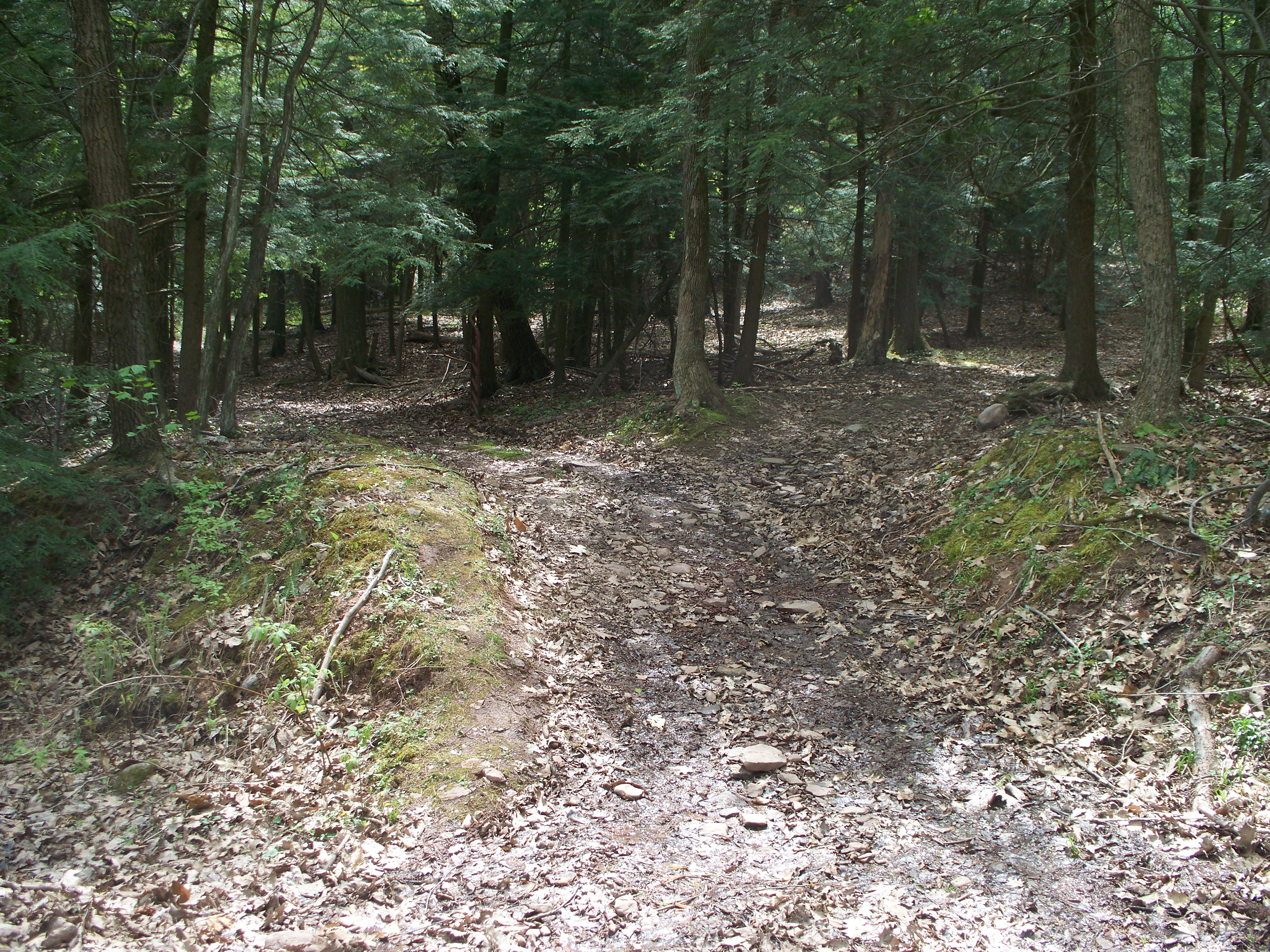
Trailhead

== Remarks ==
A block of flat-lying, brown and green sandstone (Catskill Formation, Devonian age), 3 by 8 feet in cross section, 6 feet thick, resting on a pedestal that is 18 by 30 inches. The outcrop is on the rim of the Allegheny Ridge; an excellent example of differential weathering.
