= 1904 United States presidential election in Pennsylvania =

- November 8, 1904
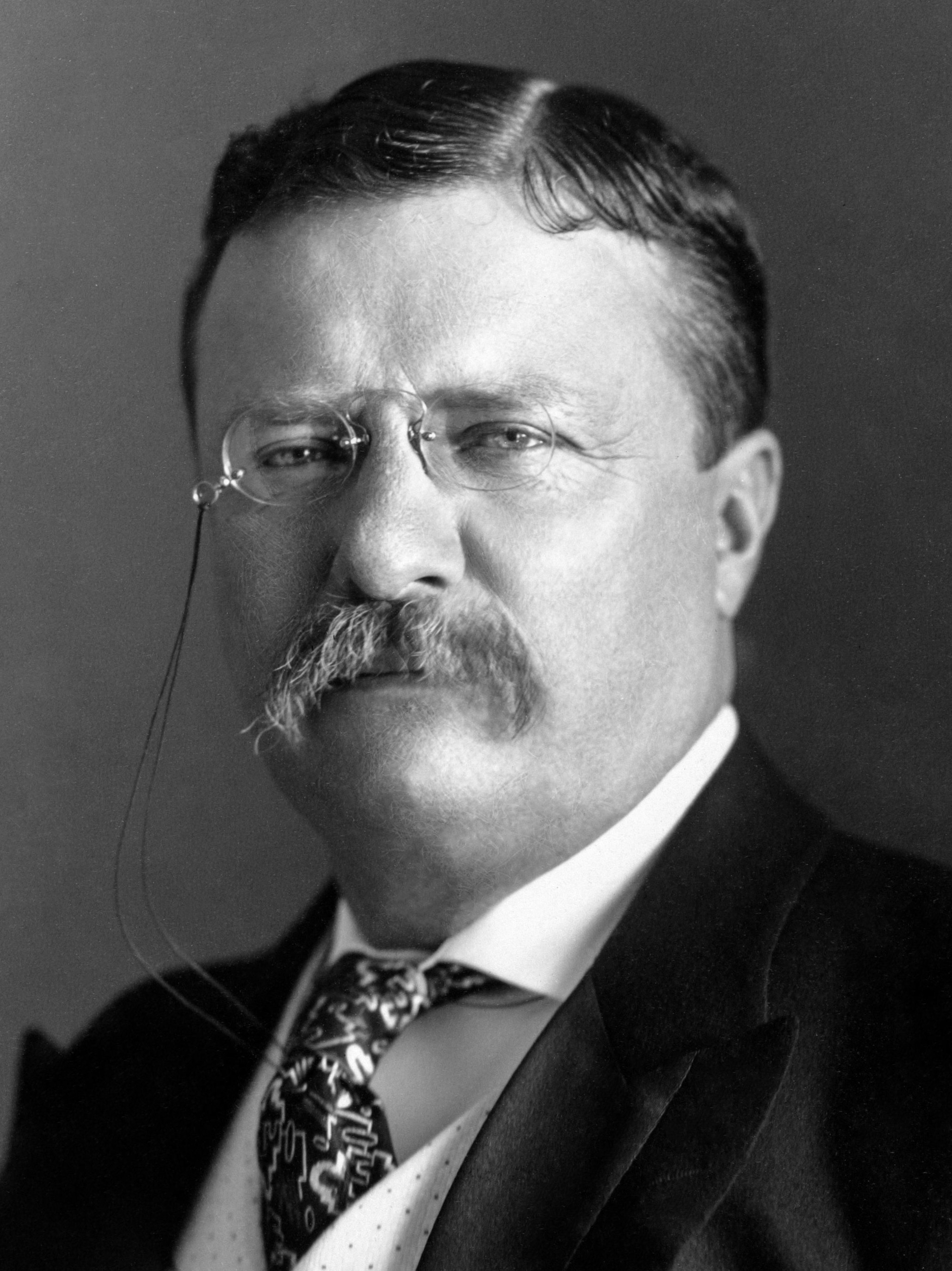

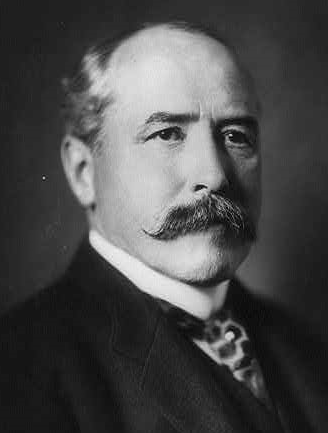
Nominee	Theodore Roosevelt	Alton B. Parker
Party	Republican	Democratic
Alliance	-	Independence
Home state	New York	New York
Running mate	Charles W. Fairbanks	Henry G. Davis
Electoral vote	34	0
Popular vote	840,949	337,998
Percentage	68.00%	27.33%
County results
Roosevelt
50–60%
60–70%
70–80%
80–90%
Parker
40–50%
50–60%
60–70%
President before election
Theodore Roosevelt
Republican
Elected President
Theodore Roosevelt
Republican

A presidential election was held in Pennsylvania on November 8, 1904, as part of the 1904 United States presidential election. Voters chose 34 representatives, or electors to the Electoral College, who voted for president and vice president.

Pennsylvania overwhelmingly voted for the Republican nominee, President Theodore Roosevelt, over the Democratic nominee, former Chief Judge of New York Court of Appeals Alton B. Parker. Roosevelt won Pennsylvania by a landslide margin of 40.67%. His record is the best presidential performance in Pennsylvania since the Era of Good Feelings, when nearly unopposed Democratic-Republicans often carried the state by landslide margins. and Parker carried just 6 rural counties largely populated either by Pennsylvania German voters historically opposed to the Civil War and to the pietism of the Republican Party, or by Appalachian mountaineers sympathetic to the South in that war. Roosevelt was the first ever Republican victor in the historically Democratic counties of Northampton and Sullivan in the anti-Yankee northeast and German Lutheran York in the Appalachian south.

== Results ==
1904 United States presidential election in Pennsylvania
Party	Candidate	Votes	Percentage	Electoral votes
Republican	Theodore Roosevelt (incumbent)	840,949	68.00%	34
Democratic/Independence Party (Note: The Parker vote in Pennsylvania was the fusion of Democratic and Independence votes.)	Alton B. Parker	337,998	27.33%	0
Prohibition	Silas C. Swallow	33,717	2.73%	0
Socialist	Eugene V. Debs	21,863	1.77%	0
Socialist Labor	Charles Hunter Corregan	2,211	0.18%	0
Totals		1,236,738	100.00%	34

=== Results by county ===
County	Theodore Roosevelt Republican		Alton B. Parker Democratic		Silas C. Swallow Prohibition		Eugene V. Debs Socialist		Charles H. Corregan Socialist Labor		Margin		Total votes cast
County	#	%	#	%	#	%	#	%	#	%	#	%	Total votes cast
Adams	4,017	50.65%	3,812	48.06%	79	1.00%	16	0.20%	7	0.09%	205	2.58%	7,931
Allegheny	90,594	76.51%	21,541	18.19%	2,216	1.87%	3,438	2.90%	616	0.52%	69,053	58.32%	118,405
Armstrong	5,798	67.94%	2,270	26.60%	346	4.05%	112	1.31%	8	0.09%	3,528	41.34%	8,534
Beaver	7,122	68.88%	2,342	22.65%	407	3.94%	438	4.24%	31	0.30%	4,780	46.23%	10,340
Bedford	5,364	61.16%	3,042	34.68%	191	2.18%	173	1.97%	1	0.01%	2,322	26.47%	8,771
Berks	15,539	46.28%	16,357	48.71%	336	1.00%	1,313	3.91%	34	0.10%	-818	-2.44%	33,579
Blair	12,482	73.46%	3,675	21.63%	681	4.01%	130	0.77%	24	0.14%	8,807	51.83%	16,992
Bradford	8,303	69.23%	2,862	23.86%	741	6.18%	79	0.66%	8	0.07%	5,441	45.37%	11,993
Bucks	9,572	57.73%	6,719	40.52%	175	1.06%	89	0.54%	26	0.16%	2,853	17.21%	16,581
Butler	6,596	63.43%	3,187	30.65%	511	4.91%	87	0.84%	18	0.17%	3,409	32.78%	10,399
Cambria	13,109	61.78%	7,232	34.08%	646	3.04%	180	0.85%	53	0.25%	5,877	27.70%	21,220
Cameron	1,228	73.75%	404	24.26%	27	1.62%	3	0.18%	3	0.18%	824	49.49%	1,665
Carbon	4,505	53.93%	2,998	35.89%	148	1.77%	691	8.27%	11	0.13%	1,507	18.04%	8,353
Centre	5,291	55.18%	4,015	41.87%	272	2.84%	6	0.06%	5	0.05%	1,276	13.31%	9,589
Chester	14,200	73.90%	4,342	22.60%	528	2.75%	138	0.72%	7	0.04%	9,858	51.30%	19,215
Clarion	2,978	50.95%	2,466	42.19%	374	6.40%	22	0.38%	5	0.09%	512	8.76%	5,845
Clearfield	9,541	64.12%	4,291	28.84%	821	5.52%	188	1.26%	38	0.26%	5,250	35.28%	14,879
Clinton	3,535	61.36%	1,941	33.69%	177	3.07%	102	1.77%	6	0.10%	1,594	27.67%	5,761
Columbia	3,635	44.08%	4,196	50.89%	348	4.22%	56	0.68%	11	0.13%	-561	-6.80%	8,246
Crawford	7,450	59.03%	3,645	28.88%	995	7.88%	504	3.99%	26	0.21%	3,805	30.15%	12,620
Cumberland	7,138	56.74%	5,038	40.05%	367	2.92%	31	0.25%	6	0.05%	2,100	16.69%	12,580
Dauphin	16,508	72.61%	5,040	22.17%	910	4.00%	266	1.17%	10	0.04%	11,468	50.44%	22,734
Delaware	15,032	78.15%	3,586	18.64%	391	2.03%	207	1.08%	20	0.10%	11,446	59.50%	19,236
Elk	3,820	55.25%	2,857	41.32%	183	2.65%	50	0.72%	4	0.06%	963	13.93%	6,914
Erie	11,951	62.84%	5,119	26.92%	1,152	6.06%	729	3.83%	67	0.35%	6,832	35.92%	19,018
Fayette	11,486	57.23%	6,792	33.84%	1,556	7.75%	214	1.07%	23	0.11%	4,694	23.39%	20,071
Forest	1,328	68.14%	411	21.09%	195	10.01%	14	0.72%	1	0.05%	917	47.05%	1,949
Franklin	7,062	61.76%	4,114	35.98%	233	2.04%	22	0.19%	4	0.03%	2,948	25.78%	11,435
Fulton	1,100	48.48%	1,137	50.11%	30	1.32%	1	0.04%	1	0.04%	-37	-1.63%	2,269
Greene	2,442	41.32%	3,198	54.11%	232	3.93%	34	0.58%	4	0.07%	-756	-12.79%	5,910
Huntingdon	4,587	73.11%	1,324	21.10%	335	5.34%	24	0.38%	4	0.06%	3,263	52.01%	6,274
Indiana	6,878	77.25%	1,558	17.50%	354	3.98%	109	1.22%	5	0.06%	5,320	59.75%	8,904
Jefferson	5,860	69.09%	2,095	24.70%	463	5.46%	51	0.60%	13	0.15%	3,765	44.39%	8,482
Juniata	1,985	60.28%	1,202	36.50%	99	3.01%	5	0.15%	2	0.06%	783	23.78%	3,293
Lackawanna	19,923	64.54%	10,068	32.62%	529	1.71%	272	0.88%	75	0.24%	9,855	31.93%	30,867
Lancaster	26,083	76.54%	7,092	20.81%	570	1.67%	313	0.92%	19	0.06%	18,991	55.73%	34,077
Lawrence	7,634	66.35%	1,894	16.46%	862	7.49%	1,090	9.47%	26	0.23%	5,740	49.89%	11,506
Lebanon	6,938	70.19%	2,449	24.78%	439	4.44%	54	0.55%	4	0.04%	4,489	45.42%	9,884
Lehigh	11,826	52.89%	10,138	45.34%	188	0.84%	177	0.79%	29	0.13%	1,688	7.55%	22,358
Luzerne	27,809	64.83%	13,518	31.51%	485	1.13%	983	2.29%	100	0.23%	14,291	33.32%	42,895
Lycoming	8,928	52.89%	6,424	38.06%	865	5.12%	647	3.83%	15	0.09%	2,504	14.84%	16,879
McKean	5,719	67.48%	1,636	19.30%	763	9.00%	329	3.88%	28	0.33%	4,083	48.18%	8,475
Mercer	8,574	60.67%	3,845	27.21%	958	6.78%	736	5.21%	20	0.14%	4,729	33.46%	14,133
Mifflin	3,054	66.10%	1,378	29.83%	170	3.68%	11	0.24%	7	0.15%	1,676	36.28%	4,620
Monroe	1,446	34.46%	2,587	61.65%	150	3.57%	10	0.24%	3	0.07%	-1,141	-27.19%	4,196
Montgomery	18,833	62.58%	10,420	34.62%	346	1.15%	455	1.51%	42	0.14%	8,413	27.95%	30,096
Montour	1,518	51.37%	1,358	45.96%	74	2.50%	4	0.14%	1	0.03%	160	5.41%	2,955
Northampton	11,039	51.21%	9,914	45.99%	412	1.91%	173	0.80%	19	0.09%	1,125	5.22%	21,557
Northumberland	11,219	62.41%	5,936	33.02%	388	2.16%	404	2.25%	30	0.17%	5,283	29.39%	17,977
Perry	3,433	60.72%	2,094	37.04%	118	2.09%	6	0.11%	3	0.05%	1,339	23.68%	5,654
Philadelphia	227,709	80.85%	48,784	17.32%	1,521	0.54%	3,254	1.16%	386	0.14%	178,925	63.53%	281,654
Pike	592	37.59%	942	59.81%	24	1.52%	11	0.70%	6	0.38%	-350	-22.22%	1,575
Potter	3,976	70.15%	1,074	18.95%	384	6.77%	226	3.99%	8	0.14%	2,902	51.20%	5,668
Schuylkill	21,046	65.10%	10,115	31.29%	310	0.96%	805	2.49%	52	0.16%	10,931	33.81%	32,328
Snyder	2,538	71.55%	972	27.40%	34	0.96%	3	0.08%	0	0.00%	1,566	44.15%	3,547
Somerset	6,772	72.37%	1,686	18.02%	448	4.79%	420	4.49%	32	0.34%	5,086	54.35%	9,358
Sullivan	1,429	52.04%	1,188	43.26%	117	4.26%	12	0.44%	0	0.00%	241	8.78%	2,746
Susquehanna	4,988	61.20%	2,573	31.57%	481	5.90%	91	1.12%	17	0.21%	2,415	29.63%	8,150
Tioga	7,410	79.32%	1,541	16.50%	329	3.52%	57	0.61%	5	0.05%	5,869	62.82%	9,342
Union	2,548	69.26%	1,034	28.11%	92	2.50%	3	0.08%	2	0.05%	1,514	41.15%	3,679
Venango	5,892	57.33%	1,747	17.00%	2,105	20.48%	509	4.95%	25	0.24%	3,787 (Note: In this county where Swallow ran second ahead of Parker, margin given is Roosevelt vote minus Swallow vote and percentage margin Roosevelt percentage minus Swallow percentage.)	36.85%	10,278
Warren	4,737	68.57%	1,222	17.69%	830	12.02%	97	1.40%	22	0.32%	3,515	50.88%	6,908
Washington	11,530	66.01%	4,886	27.97%	728	4.17%	289	1.65%	34	0.19%	6,644	38.04%	17,467
Wayne	3,386	56.85%	2,097	35.21%	426	7.15%	40	0.67%	7	0.12%	1,289	21.64%	5,956
Westmoreland	17,239	63.16%	8,007	29.33%	1,408	5.16%	557	2.04%	85	0.31%	9,232	33.82%	27,296
Wyoming	2,308	56.90%	1,575	38.83%	169	4.17%	3	0.07%	1	0.02%	733	18.07%	4,056
York	14,837	51.85%	12,996	45.42%	475	1.66%	300	1.05%	6	0.02%	1,841	6.43%	28,614
Totals	840,949	68.00%	337,998	27.33%	33,717	2.73%	21,863	1.77%	2,211	0.18%	502,951	40.67%	1,236,738

== See also ==
- United States presidential elections in Pennsylvania
