= 1908 United States presidential election in Pennsylvania =

- November 3, 1908

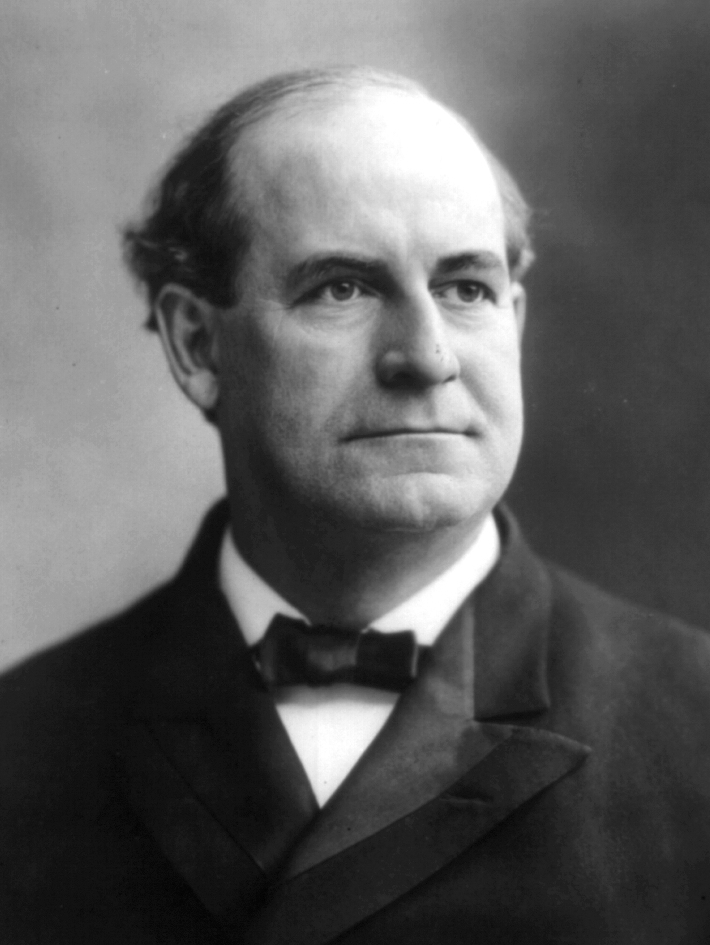
Nominee	William Howard Taft	William Jennings Bryan
Party	Republican	Democratic
Home state	Ohio	Nebraska
Running mate	James S. Sherman	John W. Kern
Electoral vote	34	0
Popular vote	745,779	448,782
Percentage	58.84%	35.41%
County results
Taft
40–50%
50–60%
60–70%
70–80%
Bryan
40–50%
50–60%
60–70%
President before election
Theodore Roosevelt
Republican
Elected President
William Howard Taft
Republican

A presidential election was held in Pennsylvania on November 3, 1908, as part of the 1908 United States presidential election, throughout 46 states (Arizona and New Mexico were still territories that would participate in the next election). This was the first presidential election in which Oklahoma participated. Voters chose 34 representatives, or electors to the Electoral College, who voted for president and vice president.

Pennsylvania overwhelmingly voted for the Republican nominees, Secretary of War William Howard Taft of Ohio and his running mate James S. Sherman of New York. They defeated the Democratic nominees, former U.S. Representative William Jennings Bryan of Nebraska and his running mate John W. Kern of Indiana. Taft won the state by a landslide margin of 23.43%.

Bryan had previously lost Pennsylvania to William McKinley in both 1896 and 1900.

== Results ==
1908 United States presidential election in Pennsylvania
Party	Candidate	Votes	Percentage	Electoral votes
Republican	William Howard Taft	745,779	58.84%	34
Democratic	William Jennings Bryan	448,782	35.41%	0
Prohibition	Eugene W. Chafin	36,694	2.90%	0
Socialist	Eugene V. Debs	33,914	2.68%	0
Socialist Labor	August Gillhaus	1,224	0.10%	0
Independence	Thomas L. Hisgen	1,057	0.08%	0
Totals		1,270,250	100.00%	34

=== Results by county ===
County	William Howard Taft Republican		William Jennings Bryan Democratic		Various candidates Other parties		Margin		Total votes cast
County	#	%	#	%	#	%	#	%	Total votes cast
Adams	4,034	51.40%	3,685	46.95%	130	1.66%	349	4.45%	7,849
Allegheny	74,080	60.77%	35,655	29.25%	12,170	9.98%	38,425	31.52%	121,905
Armstrong	6,110	59.67%	3,212	31.37%	917	8.96%	2,898	28.30%	10,239
Beaver	7,008	55.95%	4,200	33.53%	1,318	10.52%	2,808	22.42%	12,526
Bedford	4,784	57.03%	3,196	38.10%	408	4.86%	1,588	18.93%	8,388
Berks	13,642	41.01%	17,381	52.25%	2,245	6.75%	-3,739	-11.24%	33,268
Blair	10,583	67.00%	3,981	25.20%	1,232	7.80%	6,602	41.80%	15,796
Bradford	7,997	63.43%	3,758	29.81%	853	6.77%	4,239	33.62%	12,608
Bucks	9,409	55.33%	7,233	42.54%	362	2.13%	2,176	12.80%	17,004
Butler	6,584	54.15%	4,698	38.64%	877	7.21%	1,886	15.51%	12,159
Cambria	12,325	57.87%	7,979	37.47%	992	4.66%	4,346	20.41%	21,296
Cameron	1,110	65.72%	533	31.56%	46	2.72%	577	34.16%	1,689
Carbon	4,486	49.23%	3,890	42.69%	737	8.09%	596	6.54%	9,113
Centre	4,927	53.12%	3,998	43.10%	351	3.78%	929	10.02%	9,276
Chester	13,118	64.07%	6,555	32.01%	803	3.92%	6,563	32.05%	20,476
Clarion	2,915	42.92%	3,291	48.46%	585	8.61%	-376	-5.54%	6,791
Clearfield	7,726	55.38%	4,954	35.51%	1,271	9.11%	2,772	19.87%	13,951
Clinton	3,477	54.54%	2,547	39.95%	351	5.51%	930	14.59%	6,375
Columbia	3,718	39.17%	5,373	56.60%	402	4.23%	-1,655	-17.43%	9,493
Crawford	7,679	52.58%	5,668	38.81%	1,258	8.61%	2,011	13.77%	14,605
Cumberland	6,261	51.35%	5,403	44.32%	528	4.33%	858	7.04%	12,192
Dauphin	15,637	63.38%	7,546	30.59%	1,488	6.03%	8,091	32.80%	24,671
Delaware	15,184	70.75%	5,727	26.69%	550	2.56%	9,457	44.07%	21,461
Elk	2,991	51.52%	2,531	43.60%	283	4.88%	460	7.92%	5,805
Erie	10,828	55.76%	6,173	31.79%	2,418	12.45%	4,655	23.97%	19,419
Fayette	10,012	50.26%	8,220	41.26%	1,689	8.48%	1,792	9.00%	19,921
Forest	1,119	60.91%	512	27.87%	206	11.21%	607	33.04%	1,837
Franklin	6,938	58.05%	4,682	39.17%	332	2.78%	2,256	18.88%	11,952
Fulton	974	45.45%	1,098	51.24%	71	3.31%	-124	-5.79%	2,143
Greene	2,438	37.22%	3,793	57.91%	319	4.87%	-1,355	-20.69%	6,550
Huntingdon	4,503	66.34%	1,917	28.24%	368	5.42%	2,586	38.10%	6,788
Indiana	6,416	67.44%	1,965	20.65%	1,133	11.91%	4,451	46.78%	9,514
Jefferson	5,652	60.20%	2,982	31.76%	755	8.04%	2,670	28.44%	9,389
Juniata	1,765	54.09%	1,414	43.33%	84	2.57%	351	10.76%	3,263
Lackawanna	18,590	53.44%	15,451	44.41%	747	2.15%	3,139	9.02%	34,788
Lancaster	23,523	71.43%	8,109	24.62%	1,299	3.94%	15,414	46.81%	32,931
Lawrence	5,350	54.06%	2,656	26.84%	1,890	19.10%	2,694	27.22%	9,896
Lebanon	6,874	67.08%	2,858	27.89%	515	5.03%	4,016	39.19%	10,247
Lehigh	11,593	48.80%	11,285	47.50%	879	3.70%	308	1.30%	23,757
Luzerne	24,594	56.24%	17,379	39.74%	1,760	4.02%	7,215	16.50%	43,733
Lycoming	8,708	50.78%	7,144	41.66%	1,298	7.57%	1,564	9.12%	17,150
McKean	5,073	58.01%	2,867	32.78%	805	9.21%	2,206	25.23%	8,745
Mercer	6,497	47.27%	5,473	39.82%	1,774	12.91%	1,024	7.45%	13,744
Mifflin	2,902	59.39%	1,799	36.82%	185	3.79%	1,103	22.57%	4,886
Monroe	1,454	31.62%	3,004	65.32%	141	3.07%	-1,550	-33.70%	4,599
Montgomery	19,088	59.82%	11,899	37.29%	922	2.89%	7,189	22.53%	31,909
Montour	1,164	42.34%	1,490	54.20%	95	3.46%	-326	-11.86%	2,749
Northampton	10,857	46.91%	11,365	49.10%	923	3.99%	-508	-2.19%	23,145
Northumberland	10,439	51.97%	8,590	42.76%	1,058	5.27%	1,849	9.20%	20,087
Perry	3,269	58.82%	2,184	39.29%	105	1.89%	1,085	19.52%	5,558
Philadelphia	185,263	69.09%	75,310	28.09%	7,568	2.82%	109,953	41.01%	268,141
Pike	715	39.24%	1,069	58.67%	38	2.09%	-354	-19.43%	1,822
Potter	3,603	60.47%	1,932	32.43%	423	7.10%	1,671	28.05%	5,958
Schuylkill	18,758	52.57%	15,481	43.39%	1,440	4.04%	3,277	9.18%	35,679
Snyder	2,401	67.41%	1,081	30.35%	80	2.25%	1,320	37.06%	3,562
Somerset	6,478	68.15%	2,246	23.63%	781	8.22%	4,232	44.52%	9,505
Sullivan	1,119	47.24%	1,076	45.42%	174	7.34%	43	1.82%	2,369
Susquehanna	4,999	57.30%	3,230	37.02%	496	5.68%	1,769	20.28%	8,725
Tioga	6,947	71.28%	2,321	23.81%	478	4.90%	4,626	47.47%	9,746
Union	2,547	66.89%	1,154	30.30%	107	2.81%	1,393	36.58%	3,808
Venango	4,868	49.73%	2,815	28.76%	2,105	21.51%	2,053	20.97%	9,788
Warren	4,672	62.03%	2,054	27.27%	806	10.70%	2,618	34.76%	7,532
Washington	11,430	65.81%	4,886	28.13%	1,051	6.05%	6,544	37.68%	17,367
Wayne	3,650	56.67%	2,438	37.85%	353	5.48%	1,212	18.82%	6,441
Westmoreland	15,429	52.00%	11,101	37.41%	3,141	10.59%	4,328	14.59%	29,671
Wyoming	2,234	55.79%	1,629	40.68%	141	3.52%	605	15.11%	4,004
York	14,610	47.48%	15,171	49.30%	990	3.22%	-561	-1.82%	30,771
Totals	746,128	59.10%	444,297	35.19%	72,100	5.71%	301,831	23.91%	1,262,525

== See also ==
- United States presidential elections in Pennsylvania
