= 2021 United States House of Representatives elections =

Special elections to the 117th United States Congress

- March 20 – November 2, 2021

6 of the 435 seats in the United States House of Representatives 218 seats needed for a majority
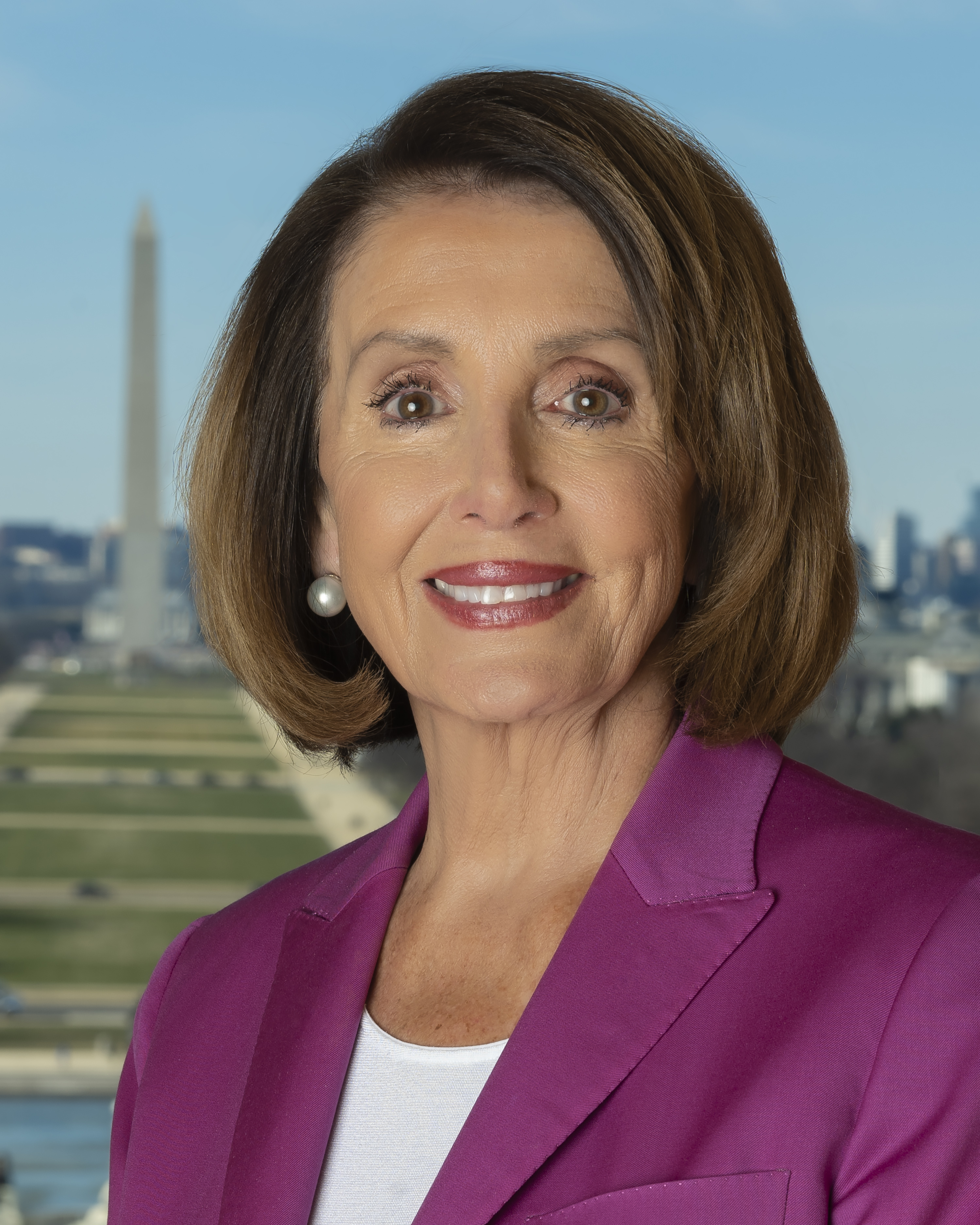

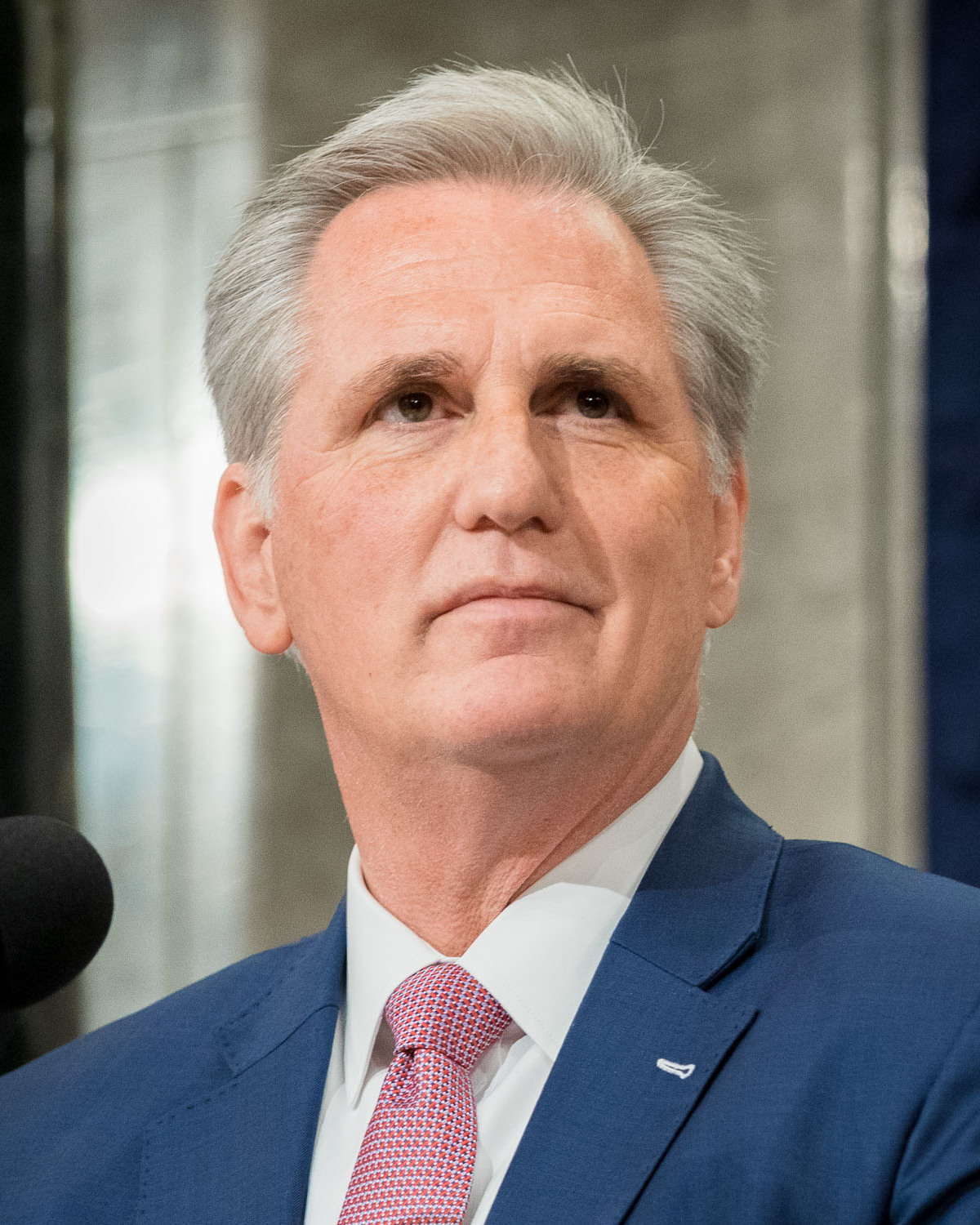
	Majority party	Minority party
Leader	Nancy Pelosi	Kevin McCarthy
Party	Democratic	Republican
Leader since	January 3, 2003	January 3, 2019
Leader's seat	California 12th	California 23rd
Last election	222 seats, 50.8%	213 seats, 47.7%
Seats before	218	210
Seat change	Steady	Steady
Seats up	3	3
Races won	3	3
- Democratic hold Republican hold No election

There were six special elections to the United States House of Representatives in 2021 during the 117th United States Congress.

All of the elections were won by the party previously holding the seat. Therefore, there were no net changes in party.

== Summary ==
Elections are listed by date and district.

District	Incumbent			This race	
District	Member	Party	First elected	Results	Candidates
Louisiana 5	Vacant			Representative-elect Luke Letlow (R) died December 29, 2020, of COVID-19. New member elected March 20, 2021. Republican hold.	▌ ✓ Julia Letlow (Republican) 64.9%; ▌Sandra Christophe (Democratic) 27.3%; ▌Chad Conerly (Republican) 5.3%
Louisiana 2	Cedric Richmond	Democratic	2010	Incumbent resigned January 15, 2021, to serve as the director of the Office of Public Liaison and as a Senior Advisor to Joe Biden. New member elected April 24, 2021, after no candidate received a majority vote in the March 20 jungle primary. Democratic hold.	▌ ✓ Troy Carter (Democratic) 55.2%; ▌Karen Carter Peterson (Democratic) 44.8%
New Mexico 1	Deb Haaland	Democratic	2018	Incumbent resigned March 16, 2021, to become U.S. Secretary of the Interior. New member elected June 1, 2021. Democratic hold.	▌ ✓ Melanie Stansbury (Democratic) 60.3%; ▌Mark Moores (Republican) 35.7%; ▌Aubrey Dunn Jr. (Independent) 2.7%; ▌Chris Manning (Libertarian) 1.3%
Texas 6	Ron Wright	Republican	2018	Incumbent died February 7, 2021, of COVID-19. New member elected July 27, 2021, after no candidate received a majority vote in the May 1 jungle primary. Republican hold.	▌ ✓ Jake Ellzey (Republican) 53.3%; ▌Susan Wright (Republican) 46.7%
Ohio 11	Marcia Fudge	Democratic	2008 (special)	Incumbent resigned March 10, 2021, to become U.S. Secretary of Housing and Urban Development. New member elected November 2, 2021. Democratic hold.	▌ ✓ Shontel Brown (Democratic) 78.9%; ▌Laverne Gore (Republican) 21.1%
Ohio 15	Steve Stivers	Republican	2010	Incumbent resigned May 16, 2021, to become the president and CEO of the Ohio Chamber of Commerce. New member elected November 2, 2021. Republican hold.	▌ ✓ Mike Carey (Republican) 58.3%; ▌Allison Russo (Democratic) 41.7%

== Louisiana's 5th congressional district ==
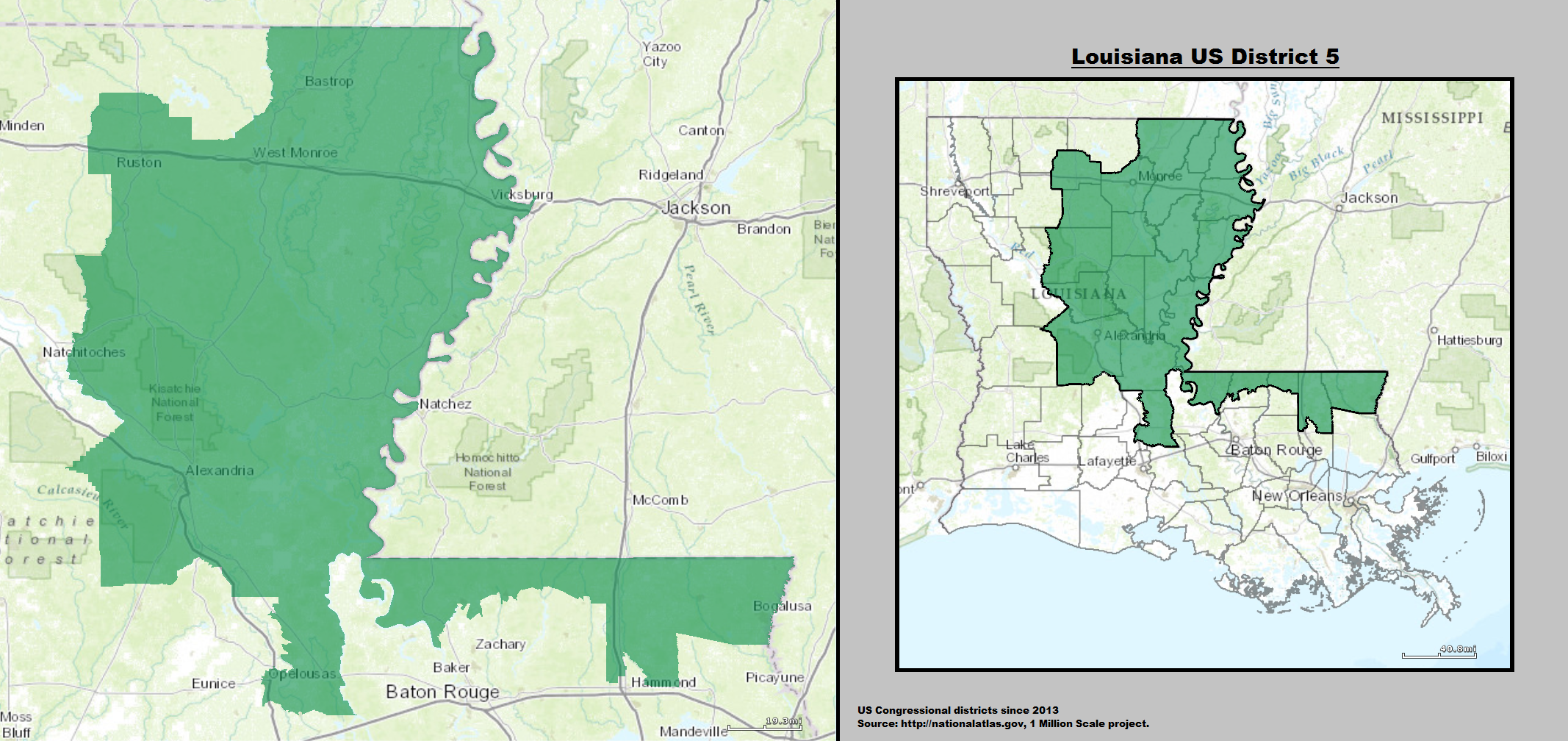
Louisiana's 5th congressional district

Republican representative-elect Luke Letlow died on December 29, 2020, before taking office. His seat was left vacant at the start of the next session of Congress. A special nonpartisan election was called by Governor John Bel Edwards for March 20, 2021. Despite a large field of Republican candidates, the election was won by Letlow's widow, Julia Letlow, who won a majority of the vote outright, eliminating the need for a runoff.

2021 Louisiana's 5th congressional district special election
Party	Candidate	Votes	%
Republican	Julia Letlow	67,203	64.86
Democratic	Sandra Christophe	28,255	27.27
Republican	Chad Conerly	5,497	5.31
Republican	Robert Lansden	929	0.90
Republican	Allen Guillory	464	0.45
Independent	Jim Davis	402	0.39
Republican	Sancha Smith	334	0.32
Republican	M.V. Mendoza	236	0.23
Independent	Jaycee Magnuson	131	0.13
Republican	Richard H. Pannell	67	0.06
Republican	Horace Melton III	62	0.06
Republican	Errol Victor Sr.	36	0.03
Total votes		103,616	100.00
Republican hold			

== Louisiana's 2nd congressional district ==
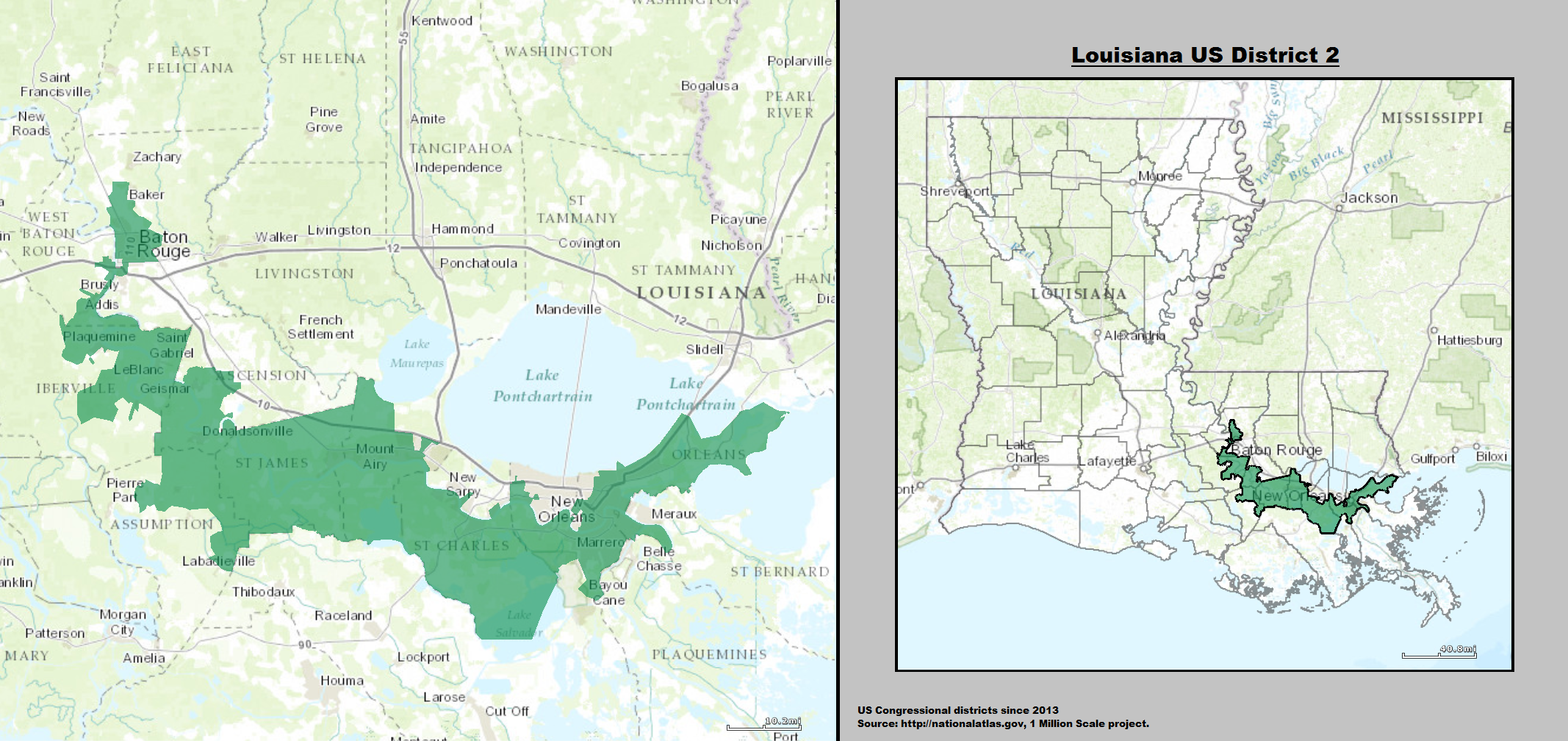
Louisiana's 2nd congressional district

Incumbent Democrat Cedric Richmond resigned on January 15, 2021, to join the Biden administration, becoming the director of the White House Office of Public Liaison and a Senior Advisor to the President. A special nonpartisan election was called by Governor John Bel Edwards for March 20, with a runoff scheduled for April 24.

No candidate reached the 50% threshold needed to win the first round on March 20. Troy Carter and Karen Carter Peterson both qualified for the April 24 runoff. Carter defeated Carter Peterson in the runoff 55% to 45%.

2021 Louisiana's 2nd congressional district special election
Party	Candidate	Votes	%
Democratic	Troy Carter	34,402	36.38
Democratic	Karen Carter Peterson	21,673	22.92
Democratic	Gary Chambers Jr.	20,163	21.31
Republican	Claston Bernard	9,237	9.77
Republican	Chelsea Ardoin	3,218	3.40
Republican	Greg Lirette	2,349	2.48
Republican	Sheldon C. Vincent Sr.	754	0.80
Democratic	Desiree Ontiveros	699	0.74
Independent	Belden Batiste	598	0.63
Democratic	Harold John	403	0.43
Libertarian	Mindy McConnell	323	0.34
Democratic	J. Christopher Johnson	288	0.30
Democratic	Jenette M. Porter	244	0.26
Democratic	Lloyd M. Kelly	122	0.13
Independent	Brandon Jolicoeur	94	0.10
Total votes		94,567	100.00

2021 Louisiana's 2nd congressional district special election runoff
Party	Candidate	Votes	%
Democratic	Troy Carter	48,513	55.25
Democratic	Karen Carter Peterson	39,297	44.75
Total votes		87,810	100.00
Democratic hold			

== New Mexico's 1st congressional district ==
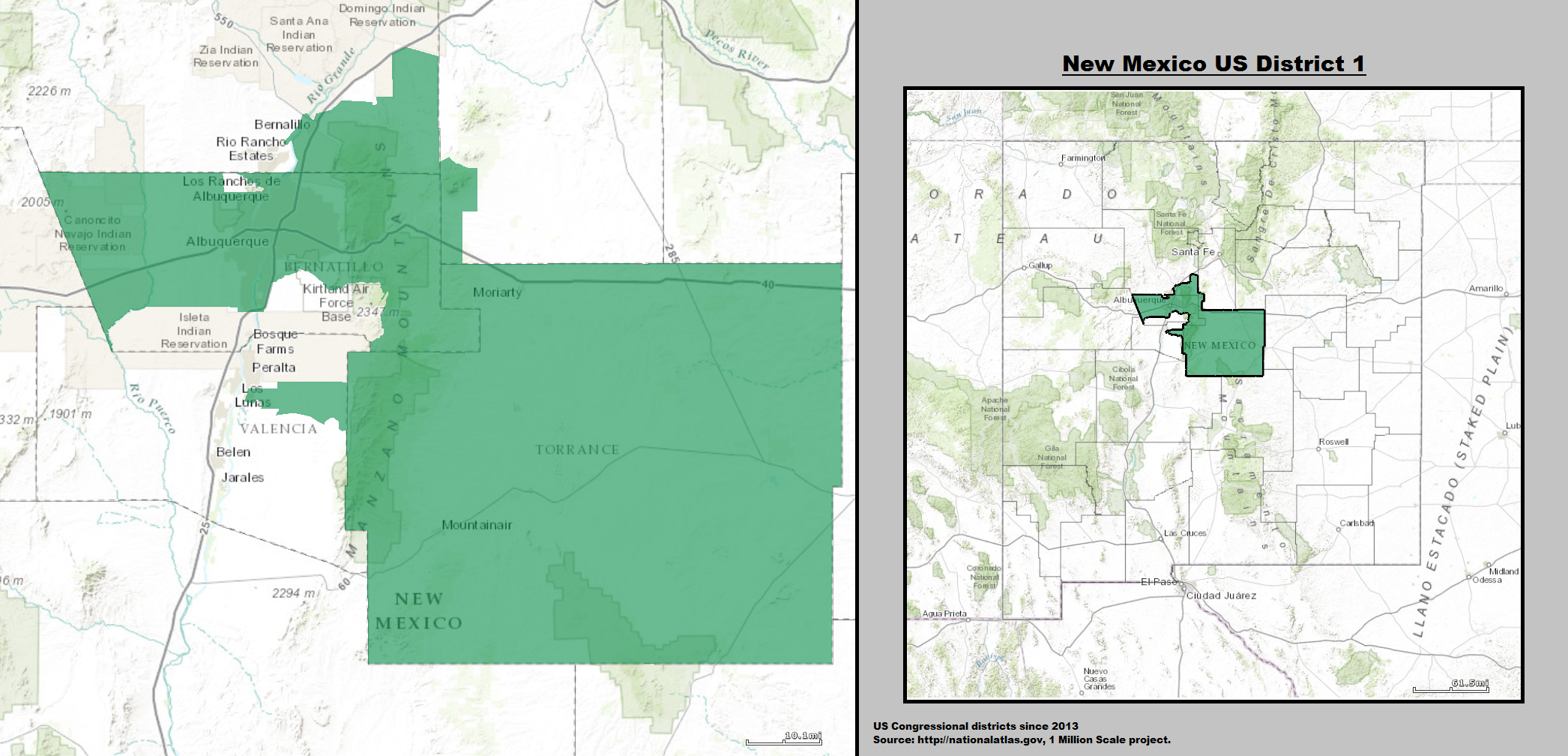
New Mexico's 1st congressional district

Incumbent Democrat Deb Haaland was nominated to become the U.S. Secretary of the Interior for the Biden administration and has been confirmed by the Senate. She resigned from her seat on March 16, 2021. Governor Michelle Lujan Grisham called a special election to be held on June 1.

Nominees for the general election were chosen by each state party's central committee. Among a number of candidates, state legislators Melanie Stansbury and Antoinette Sedillo Lopez advanced to the second round of voting, in which Stansbury narrowly prevailed. She would then defeat Republican nominee Mark Moores, as well as Aubrey Dunn Jr., the former state land commissioner who ran as an independent.

2021 New Mexico's 1st congressional district special election
Party	Candidate	Votes	%
Democratic	Melanie Stansbury	79,837	60.36
Republican	Mark Moores	47,111	35.62
Independent	Aubrey Dunn Jr.	3,534	2.67
Libertarian	Chris Manning	1,734	1.31
Write-in		46	0.03
Total votes		132,262	100.00
Democratic hold			

== Texas's 6th congressional district ==
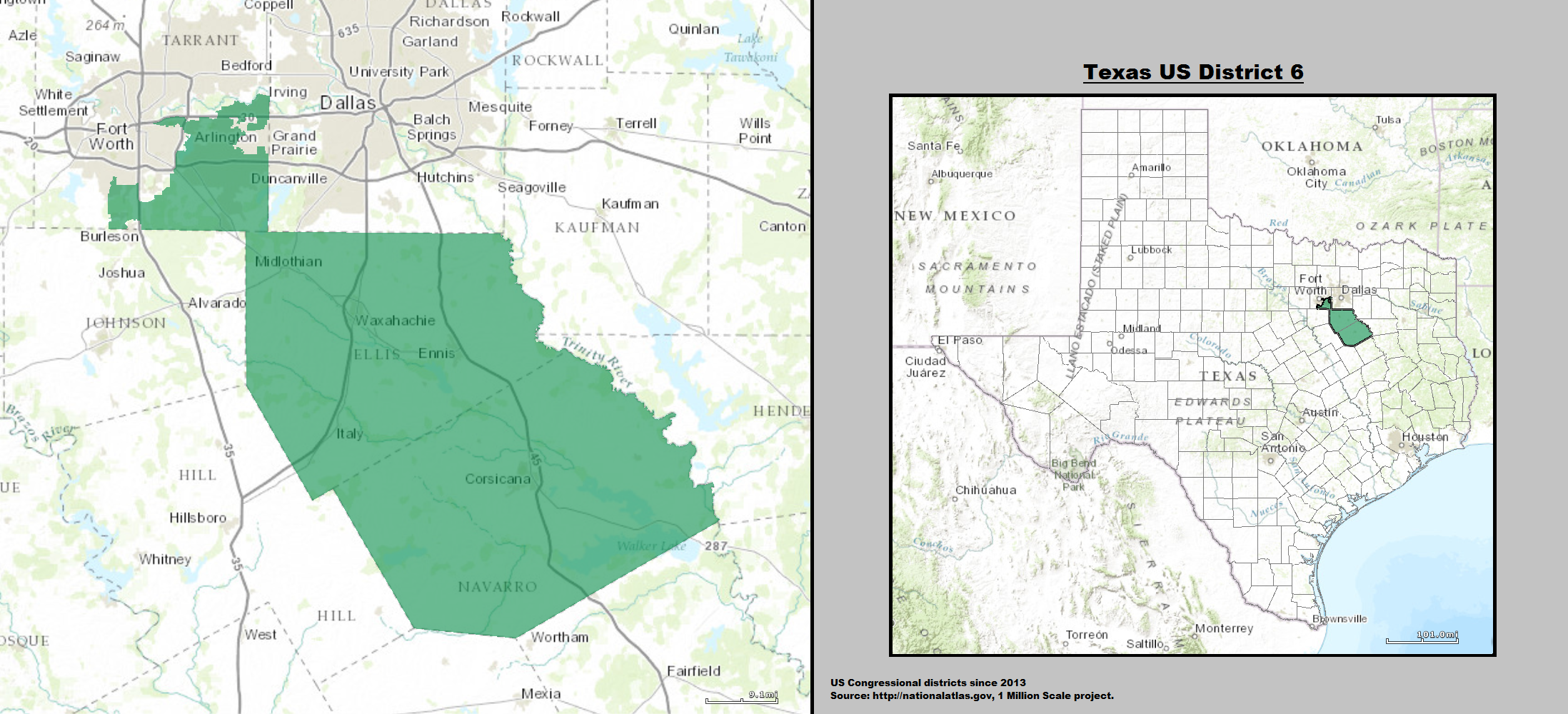
Texas's 6th congressional district

Incumbent Republican Ron Wright died on February 7, 2021. A special nonpartisan election to fill the seat was called by Governor Greg Abbott for May 1, with a runoff on July 27.

No candidate reached the 50% threshold necessary to win the first round on May 1. Susan Wright and Jake Ellzey qualified for the runoff. Elizey defeated Wright 53%-46% in the runoff election on July 28, 2021.

2021 Texas's 6th congressional district special election
Party	Candidate	Votes	%
Republican	Susan Wright	15,852	19.21
Republican	Jake Ellzey	10,851	13.85
Democratic	Jana Sanchez	10,497	13.39
Republican	Brian Harrison	8,476	10.81
Democratic	Shawn Lassiter	6,964	8.89
Republican	John Anthony Castro	4,321	5.51
Democratic	Tammy Allison Holloway	4,238	5.41
Democratic	Lydia Bean	2,920	3.73
Republican	Michael Wood	2,503	3.19
Republican	Michael Ballantine	2,224	2.84
Republican	Dan Rodimer	2,086	2.66
Democratic	Daryl J. Eddings Sr.	1,652	2.11
Republican	Mike Egan	1,543	1.97
Democratic	Patrick Moses	1,189	1.52
Democratic	Manuel R. Salazar III	1,119	1.43
Republican	Sery Kim	888	1.13
Republican	Travis Rodermund	460	0.59
Independent	Adrian Mizher	351	0.45
Democratic	Brian K. Stephenson	271	0.35
Libertarian	Phil Gray	265	0.34
Democratic	Matthew Hinterlong	252	0.32
Republican	Jennifer Garcia Sharon	150	0.19
Democratic	Chris Suprun	102	0.13
Total votes		78,374	100.00

2021 Texas's 6th congressional district special election runoff
Party	Candidate	Votes	%
Republican	Jake Ellzey	20,837	53.27
Republican	Susan Wright	18,279	46.73
Total votes		39,116	100.00
Republican hold			

== Ohio's 11th congressional district ==
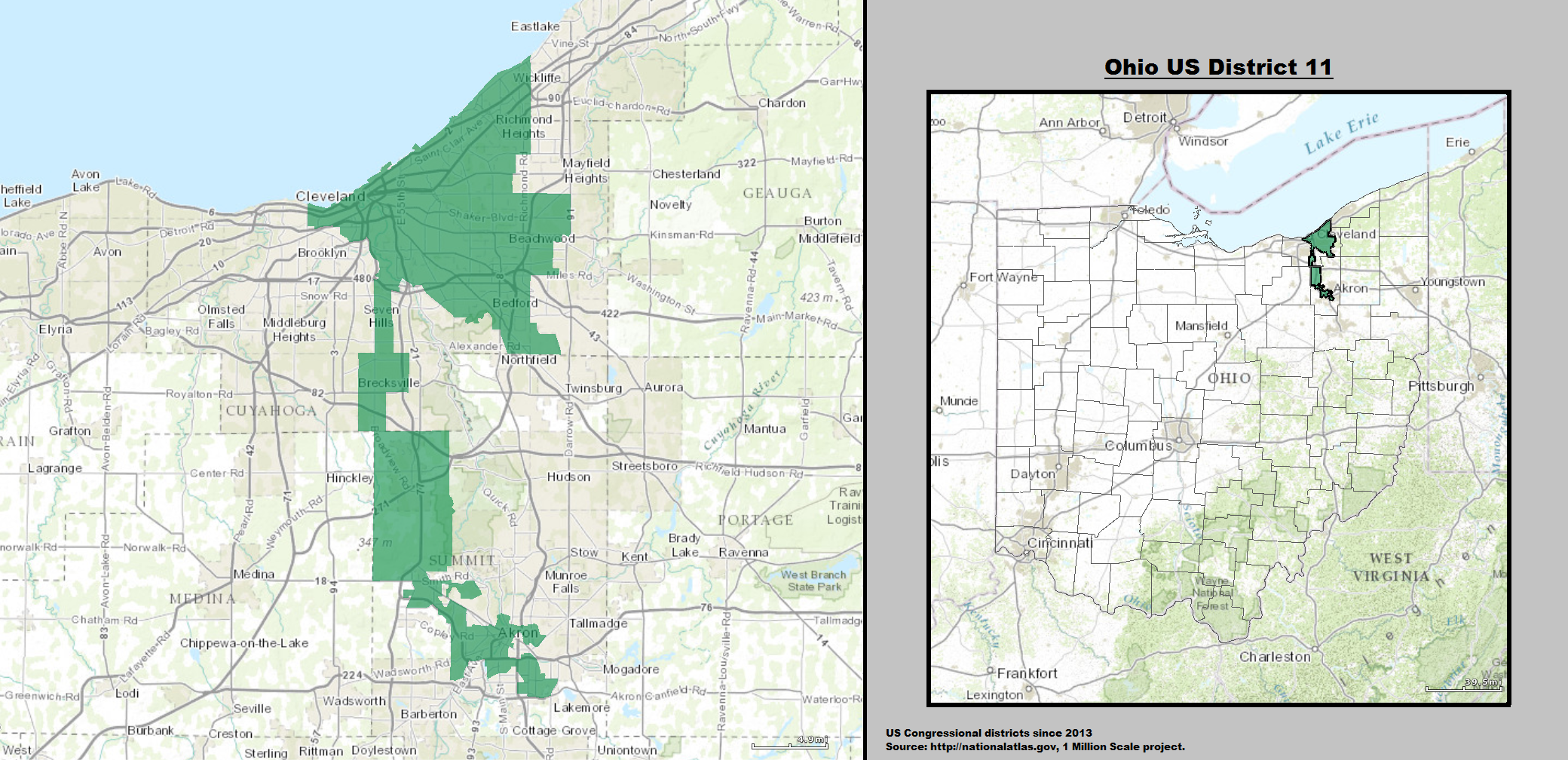
Ohio's 11th congressional district

Incumbent Democrat Marcia Fudge was nominated to become the U.S. Secretary of Housing and Urban Development for the Biden administration and was confirmed by the Senate. She resigned from her seat on March 10, 2021. Governor Mike DeWine called a special election to fill the remainder of Fudge's eighth term for November 2, with the primary being held on August 3, concurrently with the election for the 15th district.

County councilor Shontel Brown won a competitive primary against Our Revolution president Nina Turner. She would then handily win the general election, defeating Laverne Gore by a 58-point margin.

2021 Ohio's 11th congressional district special election
Party	Candidate	Votes	%
Democratic	Shontel Brown	82,913	78.88
Republican	Laverne Gore	22,198	21.12
Total votes		105,111	100.00
Democratic hold			

== Ohio's 15th congressional district ==
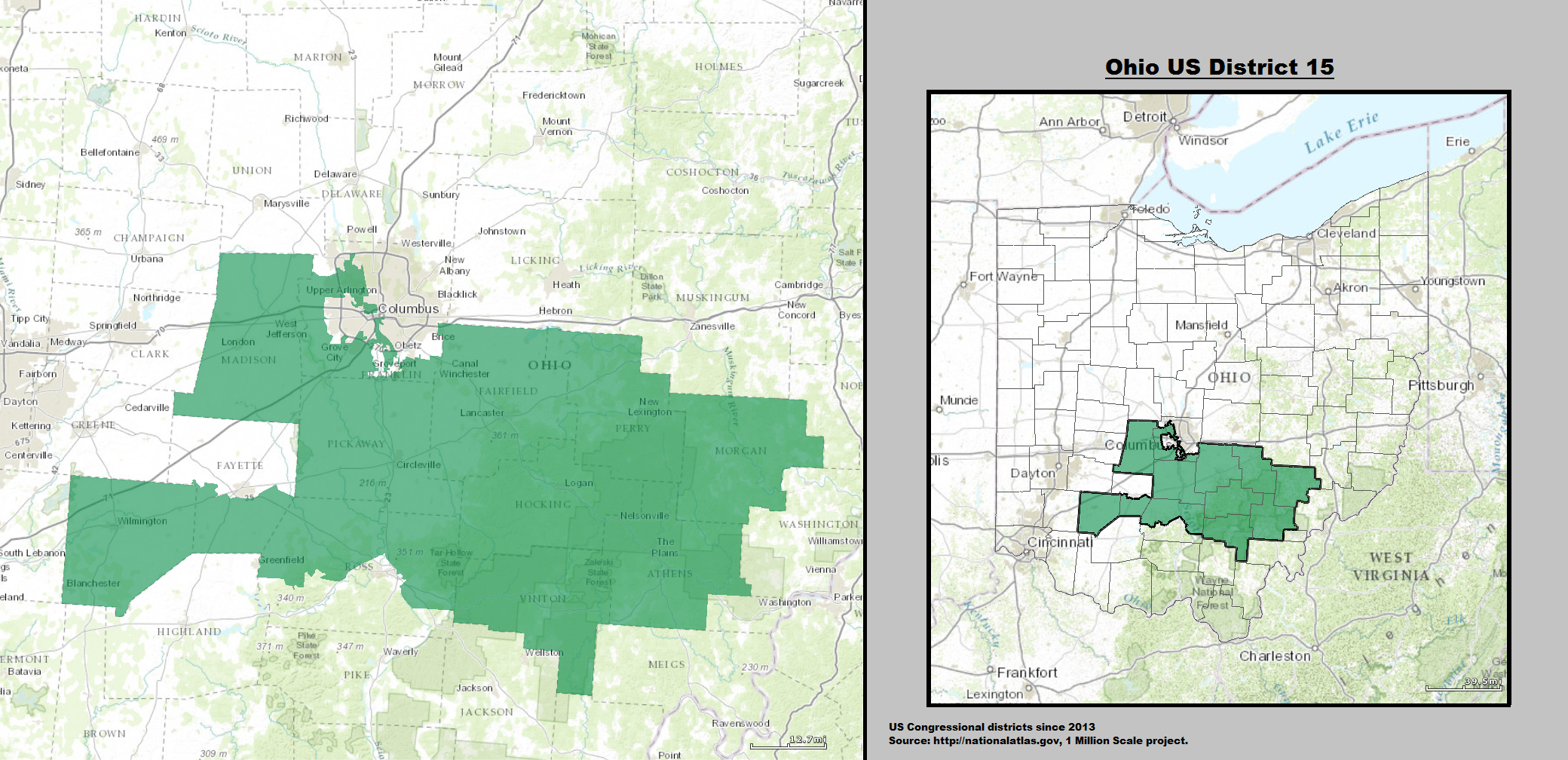
Ohio's 15th congressional district

Incumbent Republican Steve Stivers resigned on May 16, 2021, to accept the position as president and CEO of the Ohio Chamber of Commerce. Governor Mike DeWine called a special election to fill the remainder of Stivers's sixth term for November 2, with the primary being held on August 3, concurrently with the election for the 11th district.

The crowded Republican primary was won by coal mining lobbyist Mike Carey, defeating state legislators Ron Hood, Jeff LaRe, and Bob Peterson, among others. He defeated Democratic nominee Allison Russo by a comfortable margin.

2021 Ohio's 15th congressional district special election
Party	Candidate	Votes	%
Republican	Mike Carey	94,501	58.30
Democratic	Allison Russo	67,588	41.70
Total votes		162,089	100.00
Republican hold			
