= 2026 Tarrant County elections =

Local elections in Texas

- November 3, 2026

A general election was held in Tarrant County, Texas, on November 3, 2026, to elect various county-level positions. Primary elections were held on March 3, 2026, and primary runoff elections will be held on May 26 in races where no candidate received a majority of the vote.

== County Judge ==
2026 Tarrant County Judge election
- November 3, 2026

Candidate	Alisa Simmons	Tim O'Hare
Party	Democratic	Republican
Popular vote	402,291	311,040
Percentage	56.4%	43.6%
- Results by precinct Simmons: 50–60% 60–70% 70–80% 80–90% >90% O'Hare: 50–60% 60–70% 70–80% 80–90% >90% Tie: 50% No votes
County judge before election
Tim O'Hare
Republican
Elected County judge
Alisa Simmons
Democratic

The 2026 Tarrant County Judge election was held on November 3, 2026, to elect the county judge of Tarrant County, Texas. Primary elections were held on March 3. Incumbent Republican judge Tim O'Hare ran for re-election to a second consecutive term. Democrat Alisa Simmons won the general election by a decisive margin of 12.8%, marking the first time a Democrat had held the position since 1996.

=== Republican primary ===
==== Candidates ====
- Tim O'Hare, incumbent judge
- Robert Buker, candidate in 2022

==== Results ====
Republican primary
Party	Candidate	Votes	%
Republican	Tim O'Hare (incumbent)	116,746	87.60
Republican	Robert Trevor Buker	16,527	12.40
Total votes		133,273	100.00

=== Democratic primary ===
==== Candidates ====
- Alisa Simmons, county commissioner from Precinct 2 (2022–present)
- Millennium Anton C. Woods, candidate for mayor of Fort Worth in 2025

==== Withdrawn ====
- Marc Veasey, U.S. representative from TX-33 (remained on ballot)

==== Results ====
Democratic primary
Party	Candidate	Votes	%
Democratic	Alisa Simmons	105,177	61.35
Democratic	Marc Veasey (withdrawn)	44,809	26.14
Democratic	Millennium Anton C. Woods Jr.	21,453	12.51
Total votes		171,439	100.00

=== General election ===
Alisa Simmons

Organizations

- EMILYs List

2026 Tarrant County Judge election
Party	Candidate	Votes	%
Democratic	Alisa Simmons	402,291	56.40
Republican	Tim O'Hare (incumbent)	311,040	43.60
Total votes		713,331	100.00

== District Attorney ==
=== Republican primary ===
==== Candidates ====
- Phil Sorrels, incumbent district attorney

==== Results ====
Republican primary
Party	Candidate	Votes	%
Republican	Phil Sorrels (incumbent)	115,924	100.00
Total votes		115,924	100.00

=== Democratic primary ===
==== Candidates ====
- Tiffany Burks, attorney and nominee in 2022

==== Results ====
Democratic primary
Party	Candidate	Votes	%
Democratic	Tiffany Burks	157,366	100.00
Total votes		157,366	100.00

=== General election ===
2026 Tarrant County District Attorney election
Party	Candidate	Votes	%
Democratic	Tiffany Burks	397,188	55.96
Republican	Phil Sorrels (incumbent)	312,556	44.04
Total votes		709,744	100.00

== District Clerk ==
=== Republican primary ===
==== Candidates ====
- Tom Wilder, incumbent district clerk

==== Results ====
Republican primary
Party	Candidate	Votes	%
Republican	Tom Wilder (incumbent)	113,707	100.00
Total votes		113,707	100.00

=== Democratic primary ===
==== Candidates ====
- Nathan Smith, public affairs officer

==== Results ====
Democratic primary
Party	Candidate	Votes	%
Democratic	Nathan Smith	153,427	100.00
Total votes		153,427	100.00

=== General election ===
2026 Tarrant County District Clerk election
Party	Candidate	Votes	%
Democratic	Nathan Smith	398,044	56.22
Republican	Tom Wilder (incumbent)	310,020	43.78
Total votes		708,064	100.00

== County Clerk ==
=== Republican primary ===
==== Candidates ====
- Mary Louise Nicholson, incumbent county clerk

==== Results ====
Republican primary
Party	Candidate	Votes	%
Republican	Mary Louise Nicholson (incumbent)	113,347	100.00
Total votes		113,347	100.00

=== Democratic primary ===
==== Candidates ====
- Lydia Bean, small business owner, professor, and author (The Politics of Evangelical Identity)
- Gregoire Lewis, insurance agent

==== Results ====
Democratic primary
Party	Candidate	Votes	%
Democratic	Lydia Bean	129,233	79.35
Democratic	Gregoire Lewis	33,639	20.65
Total votes		162,872	100.00

=== General election ===
2026 Tarrant County Clerk election
Party	Candidate	Votes	%
Democratic	Lydia Bean	394,717	55.80
Republican	Mary Louise Nicholson (incumbent)	312,614	44.20
Total votes		707,331	100.00

== Commissioners Court ==
=== Precinct 2 ===
Incumbent commissioner Alisa Simmons ran for county judge

==== Democratic primary ====
===== Candidates =====
- Jared Williams, former member of the Fort Worth City Council
- Amanda Arizola, consultant
- Gabe Rivas, organizer

===== Results =====
Democratic primary
Party	Candidate	Votes	%
Democratic	Amanda Arizola	18,700	43.58
Democratic	Jared Williams	15,628	36.42
Democratic	Gabe Rivas	8,577	19.99
Total votes		42,905	100.00

===== Runoff =====
Democratic primary runoff
Party	Candidate	Votes	%
Democratic	Jared Williams	5,982	59.83
Democratic	Amanda Arizola	4,017	40.17
Total votes		9,999	100.00

==== Republican primary ====
===== Candidates =====
- Tony Tinderholt, member of the Texas House of Representatives from the 94th district (2015–present)
- Lucila Seri, contractor

===== Results =====
Republican primary
Party	Candidate	Votes	%
Republican	Tony Tinderholt	27,807	80.29
Republican	Lucila Seri	6,825	19.71
Total votes		34,232	100.00

==== General election ====
2026 Tarrant County Commissioners election, district 2
Party	Candidate	Votes	%
Democratic	Jared Williams	100,575	55.40
Republican	Tony Tinderholt	80,955	44.60
Total votes		181,530	100.00

=== Precinct 4 ===
==== Republican primary ====
===== Candidates =====
- Manny Ramirez, incumbent commissioner

==== Results ====
Republican primary
Party	Candidate	Votes	%
Republican	Manny Ramirez (incumbent)	29,055	100.00
Total votes		29,055	100.00

==== Democratic primary ====
===== Candidates =====
- Nydia Cardenas, business owner
- Perla Bojorquez, candidate for Texas House of Representatives in 2024
- Cedric Kanyinda, nominee for this seat in 2022

===== Results =====
Democratic primary
Party	Candidate	Votes	%
Democratic	Nydia Cardenas	19,854	58.56
Democratic	Cedric Kanyinda	7,988	23.56
Democratic	Perla Bojorquez	6,061	17.88
Total votes		33,903	100.00

==== General election ====
2026 Tarrant County Commissioners election, district 4
Party	Candidate	Votes	%
Democratic	Nydia Cardenas	89,039	51.80
Republican	Manny Ramirez (incumbent)	82,839	48.20
Total votes		171,878	100.00

== County Court at Law ==
=== No. 1 ===
Incumbent Republican judge Don Pierson is running unopposed.

2026 Tarrant County Court at Law election, No. 1
Party	Candidate	Votes	%
Republican	Don Pierson (incumbent)	388,831	100.00
Total votes		388,831	100.00

=== No. 2 ===
Incumbent Republican judge Jennifer Rymell is running unopposed.

2026 Tarrant County Court at Law election, No. 2
Party	Candidate	Votes	%
Republican	Jennifer Rymell (incumbent)	386,833	100.00
Total votes		386,833	100.00

=== No. 3 ===
Incumbent Republican judge Mike Hrabal is running unopposed.

2026 Tarrant County Court at Law election, No. 3
Party	Candidate	Votes	%
Republican	Mike Hrabal (incumbent)	384,584	100.00
Total votes		384,584	100.00

== County Criminal Court ==
=== No. 1 ===
Incumbent Republican judge David Cook is running unopposed.

2026 Tarrant County Criminal Court election, No. 1
Party	Candidate	Votes	%
Republican	David Cook (incumbent)	386,427	100.00
Total votes		386,427	100.00

=== No. 2 ===
Incumbent Republican judge Carey Walker is running unopposed.

2026 Tarrant County Criminal Court election, No. 2
Party	Candidate	Votes	%
Republican	Carey Walker (incumbent)	384,124	100.00
Total votes		384,124	100.00

=== No. 3 ===
Incumbent Republican judge Bob McCoy is running unopposed.

2026 Tarrant County Criminal Court election, No. 3
Party	Candidate	Votes	%
Republican	Bob McCoy (incumbent)	383,078	100.00
Total votes		383,078	100.00

=== No. 4 ===
Incumbent Republican judge Deborah Nekhom is running unopposed.

2026 Tarrant County Criminal Court election, No. 4
Party	Candidate	Votes	%
Republican	Deborah Nekhom (incumbent)	382,947	100.00
Total votes		382,947	100.00

=== No. 5 ===
==== Nominees ====
- Brad Clark, incumbent judge (Republican)
- Julya Billhymer, criminal attorney (Democratic)

==== General election ====
2026 Tarrant County Criminal Court election, No. 5
Party	Candidate	Votes	%
Democratic	Julya Billhymer	385,607	54.81
Republican	Brad Clark (incumbent)	317,929	45.19
Total votes		703,536	100.00

=== No. 6 ===
Incumbent Republican judge Randi Hartin is running unopposed.

2026 Tarrant County Criminal Court election, No. 6
Party	Candidate	Votes	%
Republican	Randi Hartin (incumbent)	382,754	100.00
Total votes		382,754	100.00

=== No. 7 ===
Incumbent Republican judge Eric Starnes is running unopposed.

2026 Tarrant County Criminal Court election, No. 7
Party	Candidate	Votes	%
Republican	Eric Starnes (incumbent)	381,729	100.00
Total votes		381,729	100.00

=== No. 8 ===
Incumbent Republican judge Charles Vanover is running unopposed.

2026 Tarrant County Criminal Court election, No. 8
Party	Candidate	Votes	%
Republican	Charles Vanover (incumbent)	380,950	100.00
Total votes		380,950	100.00

=== No. 9 ===
==== Nominees ====
- Brian Bolton, incumbent judge (Republican)
- Lesa Pamplin, attorney (Democratic)

==== General election ====
2026 Tarrant County Criminal Court election, No. 9
Party	Candidate	Votes	%
Democratic	Lesa Pamplin	391,855	55.59
Republican	Brian Bolton (incumbent)	313,064	44.41
Total votes		704,919	100.00

=== No. 10 ===
Incumbent Republican judge Trent Loftin is running unopposed.

2026 Tarrant County Criminal Court election, No. 10
Party	Candidate	Votes	%
Republican	Trent Loftin (incumbent)	382,202	100.00
Total votes		382,202	100.00
