= John Castro =

John Castro may refer to:

- John Anthony Castro, American tax consultant and political candidate
- John de Castro, American psychologist
- John Castro, Senior Property Manager
