= Alisa Simmons =

American politician (born 1963 or 1964)

Member of the Tarrant County Commissioners Court from Precinct 2
- Incumbent
- Assumed office January 1, 2023
- Preceded by: Devan Allen

Personal details
- Born: 1963 or 1964 (age 62–63)
- Party: Democratic
- Spouse: Don (m. 1987)
- Children: 2
- Education: Texas Woman's University (BA)

Alisa L. Simmons (born 1963 or 1964) is an American politician serving as a member of the Tarrant County Commissioners Court in Texas, representing Precinct 2. A member of the Democratic Party, she was first elected in 2022. She won the Democratic nomination for Tarrant County Judge for the 2026 election and then won the general election, defeating Republican incumbent Tim O'Hare.

== Early life and career ==
Simmons originally grew up in Austin, Texas. Simmons earned a degree in broadcast journalism from Texas Woman's University. She held several positions in communications and media relations, including at several Dallas-Fort Worth radio stations, including KHVN, and for NBC 5 Dallas as a TV news copywriter. Simmons later worked the night shift as a 911 operator in Arlington, Texas, and then later served as an administrator for Tarrant County's 911 district. She served as president of the Arlington branch of the NAACP for about a decade.

== Political career ==
=== 2010 Arlington School Board election ===
In 2010, she ran for the Arlington School Board, saying that she decided to run after years of volunteering in the district. The Fort Worth Star-Telegram endorsed her in the election, arguing that she would be especially strong at addressing the needs of African American students, who were underrepresented on the board. She placed in second in a three-way race, losing 41.7% to 32.2%.

=== 2020 State House campaign ===
Simmons was the Democratic nominee for the competitive 94th district in the 2020 Texas House of Representatives elections. She had long considered a campaign in the seat but had considered it too conservative, until in 2018, the Democratic challenger received 44% of the vote. She decided to run, but noted in an interview that "it was not going to be easy." The Democratic Legislative Campaign Committee noted to The Dallas Morning News that it was targeting her race as a priority target in Texas to flip the state House. During the campaign, she received the endorsement of the Fort Worth Star-Telegram which argued that she brought a "commendable record of service to the district" and that she would be a step up from the incumbent, Rep. Tony Tinderholt. She lost 51% to 45.9%.

== Tarrant County Commissioners Court ==
=== 2022 election ===
Precinct 2 became an open seat in 2022 after Democratic incumbent Devan Allen chose not to seek re-election. In the November 8, 2022 general election, Simmons defeated Republican Andy Nguyen with 51.45 percent of the vote, a margin of 4,067 votes, despite being substantially outspent. She took office on January 1, 2023, as one of two Democrats on the five-member court.

=== Tenure ===
Simmons has frequently been in conflict with County Judge Tim O'Hare and the court's Republican majority. She has advocated increased oversight of the Tarrant County Jail and repeatedly sought public briefings from the county Sheriff concerning deaths in custody. Following the April 2024 death of Anthony Johnson Jr., which the county medical examiner ruled a homicide by asphyxiation, Simmons questioned why the jail did not maintain a specialized response team similar to those used in some other large Texas counties.

In 2025, Simmons opposed the court's majority's reduction of the number of voting locations used for that November's election. After the court voted to eliminate more than 100 Election Day locations, Simmons proposed restoring 37 of them and adding seven early-voting sites. Her proposals were rejected by the court in two separate 3-2 party-line votes.

She opposed a mid-decade redistricting in 2025 of the county's four commissioner precincts. On June 3, 2025, the court voted 3-2 along party lines to adopt a map that was viewed as more favorable to Republicans, with Simmons and fellow Democrat Roderick Miles Jr. opposed. Simmons, who released several alternative maps, called the effort "a calculated attempt to strip representation" and described it as racial gerrymandering targeting Black and Latino voters. On the county's $250,000 contract with the Public Interest Legal Foundation to run the redistricting process, she argued that hiring the firm was "essentially hiring the arsonist to put out the fire." Two lawsuits challenging the new map as racial gerrymandering were dismissed in early December 2025, allowing it to take effect.

=== 2026 Tarrant County Judge campaign ===
Simmons announced her candidacy for Tarrant County Judge on December 6, 2025, in Arlington, citing what she called inefficiencies in county government. She won the March 3, 2026 Democratic primary with 61.35%, defeating Marc Veasey, who had remained on the ballot despite dropping out of the race, and Millennium Anton C. Woods Jr. She faced O'Hare, who won the Republican primary, in the November 3, 2026 general election. She won the election, making it the first time a Democrat has held the position since 1996.

== Personal life ==
According to a 1994 profile, Alisa married Don Simmons in 1987 and they have two sons, Donnie and Asa. She is a member of Alpha Kappa Alpha.
