= 2022 Tarrant County judicial election =

Texas county election

- November 8, 2022

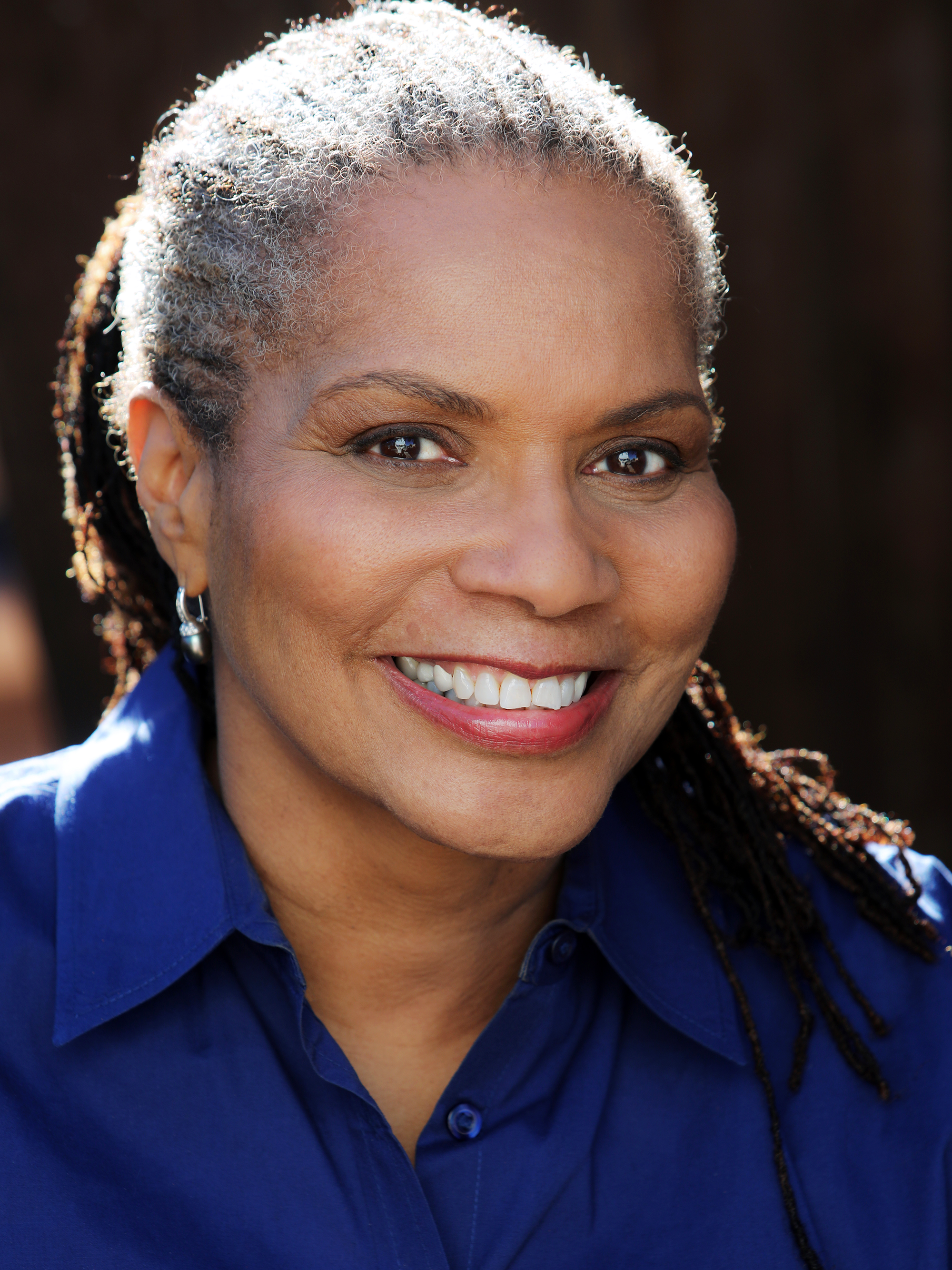
Candidate	Tim O'Hare	Deborah Peoples
Party	Republican	Democratic
Popular vote	309,176	274,326
Percentage	52.99%	47.01%
- Precinct results O'Hare: 50–60% 60–70% 70–80% 80–90% >90% Peoples: 50–60% 60–70% 70–80% 80–90% >90% Tie: 50% No data
County Judge before election
Glen Whitley
Republican
Elected County Judge
Tim O'Hare
Republican

The 2022 Tarrant County Judge election was held on November 8, 2022, to elect the County Judge of Tarrant County, Texas. Tim O'Hare, former chairman of the Tarrant County Republican Party was elected to succeed retiring County Judge B. Glen Whitley. He defeated Deborah Peoples, former chairwoman of the Tarrant County Democratic Party.

== Republican Primary ==
Incumbent Republican Glen Whitley, who was first elected in 2006, announced in June 2021 that he would not seek election to a fifth term. Two days after Whitley announced his retirement, outgoing Fort Worth mayor Betsy Price declared her candidacy and was immediately endorsed by Whitley.

As the longest-serving mayor of the largest city in the county, Price was seen as an early favorite. However, controversial former Farmers Branch mayor Tim O'Hare was endorsed by former President Donald Trump, which helped propel him to a decisive primary win with 56.9% of the vote.

=== Candidates ===
==== Nominee ====
- Tim O'Hare, former mayor of Farmers Branch

==== Eliminated in primary ====
- Betsy Price, former mayor of Fort Worth
- Byron Bradford
- Robert Trevor Buker
- Kristen Collins

=== Endorsements ===
Tim O'Hare

Executive branch officials

- Donald Trump, 45th president of the United States (2017–2021)

U.S. Representatives

- Beth Van Duyne, TX-24 (2021–present)
- Michael C. Burgess, TX-26 (2003–2025)

Local officials

- Bill Waybourn, Tarrant County Sheriff

Party officials

- Rick Barnes, Tarrant County Republican Party chairman
Betsy Price

Local officials

- Glen Whitley, incumbent county judge
- Jeff Williams, Arlington mayor (2015–2021)
- Oscar Trevino, North Richland Hills mayor

=== Results ===
Primary results by precinct: O'Hare: 40–50%; 50–60%; 60–70%; 70–80%; 80–90%; >90%; Price: 30–40%; 40–50%; 50–60%; 60–70%; 70–80%; 80–90%; >90%; Bradford: >90%; Buker: 60–70%; Tie: 20–30%; 30–40%; 40–50%; 50%; No votes

Republican primary results
Party	Candidate	Votes	%
Republican	Tim O'Hare	72,402	56.93%
Republican	Betsy Price	43,651	34.32%
Republican	Byron Bradford	4,308	3.39%
Republican	Kristen Collins	3,531	2.78%
Republican	Robert Buker	3,296	2.59%
Total votes		127,188	100.00%

== Democratic Primary ==
=== Nominee ===
- Deborah Peoples, former chairwoman of the Tarrant County Democratic Party

=== Eliminated in primary ===
- Marvin Sutton, former Arlington city councilman and candidate in the 2021 Arlington Mayoral Election

=== Results ===
Democratic primary results
Party	Candidate	Votes	%
Democratic	Deborah Peoples	59,383	82.65%
Democratic	Marvin Sutton	12,464	17.35%
Total votes		71,847	100.00%

== General election ==
=== Results ===
2022 Tarrant County Judge Election
Party	Candidate	Votes	%
Republican	Tim O'Hare	309,176	52.99%
Democratic	Deborah Peoples	274,326	47.01%
Total votes		583,502	100.00%
