= 2021 Texas's 6th congressional district special election =

Texas's 6th congressional district special election
- May 1, 2021 (first round); July 27, 2021 (runoff)

Texas's 6th congressional district
- Turnout: 16.05% (first round); 7.93% (runoff)
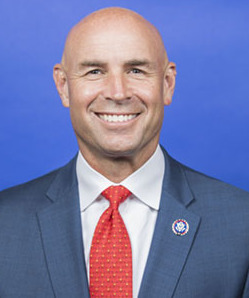

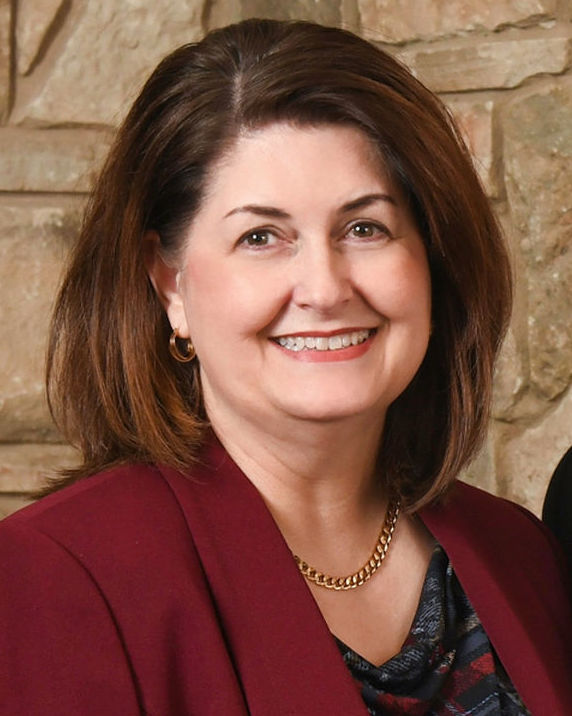

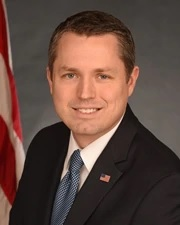

Candidate	Jake Ellzey	Susan Wright	Jana Sanchez
Party	Republican	Republican	Democratic
First round	10,865; 13.85%	15,077; 19.21%	10,518; 13.40%
Runoff	20,837; 53.27%	18,279; 46.73%	Eliminated
Candidate	Brian Harrison	Shawn Lassiter	John Anthony Castro
Party	Republican	Democratic	Republican
First round	8,485; 10.81%	6,973; 8.89%	4,321; 5.51%
Runoff	Eliminated	Eliminated	Eliminated
Candidate	Tammy Allison Holloway
Party	Democratic
First round	4,240; 5.40%
Runoff	Eliminated
- Ellzey: 20–30% 50–60% Wright: 10–20% 20–30% 50–60%
U.S. Representative before election
Ron Wright
Republican
Elected U.S. Representative
Jake Ellzey
Republican

The 2021 Texas's 6th congressional district special election was held on May 1, 2021. The seat became vacant after incumbent Republican Ron Wright died on February 7 of COVID-19.

Ron Wright's widow, Susan Wright from Arlington, who was endorsed by former president Donald Trump, and Jake Ellzey (who lost the Republican primary for this seat to Ron Wright in 2018) of Waxahachie, who served as a member of the Texas House of Representatives starting on January 12, advanced to the runoff. Ellzey finished ahead of Democrat Jana Lynne Sanchez of Fort Worth for the second place by just 354 votes. Sanchez conceded defeat to Ellzey the day after the election. The district was a Republican hold due to two Republicans advancing to the runoff.

The special election was expected to be competitive, due to the district trending Democratic in recent years and its suburban nature. A nonpartisan blanket primary took place, in which all candidates were listed on the same ballot. Since no candidate had received over 50 percent of the vote, the race proceeded to a runoff between the top two candidates in the first round, resulting in two Republicans advancing to the runoff. The runoff took place on July 27. Ellzey won the runoff election, earning 53.3% to Wright's 46.7%.

== Candidates ==
=== Republican Party ===
==== Declared ====
- Michael Ballantine, business and English lecturer
- John Anthony Castro, attorney and candidate for U.S. Senate in 2020
- Mike Egan, former U.S. Army Special Forces Officer (Green Beret) and businessman
- Jake Ellzey, state representative (2021) and candidate for Texas's 6th district in 2018
- Brian Harrison, former chief of staff of Department of Health and Human Services (2019–2021)
- Sery Kim, former SBA official
- Travis Rodermund, police officer
- Daniel Rodimer, former WWE professional wrestler and nominee for Nevada's 3rd congressional district in 2020
- Jennifer Garcia Sharon, volunteer caregiver and nominee for Texas's 35th congressional district in 2020
- Michael Wood, major in the U.S. Marine Corps Reserve
- Susan Wright, widow of former U.S. Representative Ron Wright and a committeewoman for the Texas State Republican Executive Committee (SREC) for District 10.

==== Filed paperwork ====
- Monty Markland, writer and producer
- Asa Palagi, former candidate for Governor of Washington in 2020

==== Declined ====
- Joe Barton, former U.S. Representative for Texas's 6th district
- David Cook, state representative (2021–present)
- David Hill, Mayor of Waxahachie
- Cary Moon, Fort Worth city councillor
- Andy Nguyen, deputy chief of staff for Ron Wright
- Adrian Mizher, banker (ran as an Independent)
- Katrina Pierson, former national spokesperson for Donald Trump's 2016 presidential campaign and senior advisor to Donald Trump's 2020 presidential campaign
- Manny Ramirez, President of the Fort Worth Police Officers Association
- Tony Tinderholt, state representative (2015–present)
- Bill Waybourn, Tarrant County sheriff
- Jeff Williams, Mayor of Arlington (2015–2021) (endorsed Wright)

=== Democratic Party ===
==== Declared ====
- Lydia Bean, small business owner, former state House candidate
- Daryl J. Eddings, business owner
- Matthew Hinterlong, developer
- Tammy Allison Holloway, attorney
- Shawn Lassiter, Leadership ISD Chief of Equity and Inclusion
- Patrick Moses, former assistant director for Field Operations, Department of Homeland Security and Minister
- Jana Sanchez, commentator, activist, and nominee for Texas's 6th district in 2018
- Manuel R. Salazar, realtor
- Brian K. Stephenson, systems engineer
- Chris Suprun, paramedic and Republican faithless elector in 2016

==== Declined ====
- Stephen Daniel, attorney and nominee for Texas's 6th district in 2020
- Kim Olson, former candidate for Texas's 24th district in 2020
- Chris Turner, Minority Leader of the Texas House of Representatives

=== Libertarian Party ===
==== Declared ====
- Phil Gray, property manager

=== Independent ===
==== Declared ====
- Adrian Mizher, banker

=== Endorsements ===
Lydia Bean (D)

Organizations

- Tarrant County AFL–CIO
Jake Ellzey (R)

Federal Officials

- Rick Perry, 47th governor of Texas (2000–2015) and 14th United States Secretary of Energy (2017–2019)
Sery Kim (R)

Federal Officials

- ~~Young Kim, U.S. Representative from California (2021–present)~~ (revoked)
- ~~Michelle Steel, U.S. Representative from California (2021–2025)~~ (revoked)
- John Sweeney, U.S. Representative from New York (1999–2007)

Individuals

- Tony Pham, Former ICE Acting Director
Shawn Lassiter (D)

Organizations

- 314 Action
Dan Rodimer (R)

Federal Officials

- Paul Gosar, U.S. Representative from Arizona (2011–present)
Jana Sanchez (D)

Organizations

- CHC Bold PAC
Michael Wood (R)

Federal Officials

- Adam Kinzinger, U.S. Representative from Illinois (2013–2023)

Newspapers

- The Dallas Morning News

Organizations

- Republican Accountability Project
Susan Wright (R)

Executive Branch Officials

- Donald Trump, 45th President of the United States (2017–2021)

Federal Officials

- Jodey Arrington, U.S. Representative (TX-19) (2017–present)
- Andy Biggs, U.S. Representative (AZ-5) (2017–present)
- Lance Gooden, U.S. Representative (TX-5) (2019–present)
- Kay Granger, U.S. Representative (TX-12) (1997–2025)
- Troy Nehls, U.S. Representative (TX-22) (2021–present)
- Chip Roy, U.S. Representative (TX-21) (2019–present)
- Elise Stefanik, U.S. Representative (NY-21) (2015–present)

State Legislators

- Stephanie Klick, state representative (2013–2025)
- Matt Krause, state representative (2013–2023)
- Tony Tinderholt, state representative (2015–present)

Other Individuals

- Betsy Price, Mayor of Fort Worth, Texas (2011–2021)

Organizations

- New York Young Republican Club

== Primary ==
=== Polling ===
==== Graphical summary ====
Poll source	Date(s) administered	Sample size (Note: Key: A – all adults RV – registered voters LV – likely voters V – unclear)	Margin of error	(D) Tammy Allison	(R) Michael Ballantine	(D) Lydia Bean	(R) John Castro	(D) Daryl Eddings	(R) Mike Egan	(R) Jake Ellzey	(L) Phil Gray	(R) Brian Harrison	(D) Matt Hinterlong	(R) Sery Kim	(D) Shawn Lassiter	(I) Adrian Mizher	(D) Patrick Moses	(R) Travis Rodermund	(R) Dan Rodimer	(D) Manuel Salazar	(D) Jana Sanchez	(R) Jennifer Sharon	(D) Brian Stephenson	(D) Chris Suprun	(R) Michael Wood	(R) Susan Wright	Other	Undecided
Data for Progress (D) (Note: Poll sponsored by Way to Lead, Way To Win, and Boot Texas Republicans)	April 5–12, 2021	344 (LV)	± 5.0%	–	–	9%	–	–	–	13%	–	10%	–	–	10%	2%	–	–	–	–	16%	–	–	–	–	22%	2%	14%
Global Strategy Group (D) (Note: Poll sponsored by Lydia Bean's campaign)	March 11–16, 2021	500 (LV)	± 4.4%	–	–	6%	–	–	–	8%	–	6%	–	–	4%	–	2%	–	1%	–	9%	–	–	–	–	18%	–	45%
Victoria Research (D) (Note: Poll sponsored by Jana Sanchez's campaign)	March 9–12, 2021	450 (LV)	± 4.6%	–	–	5%	–	–	–	8%	–	–	–	1%	3%	3%	2%	–	–	–	17%	–	–	–	–	21%	3%	39%

=== Predictions ===
Source	Ranking	As of
The Cook Political Report	Lean R	March 19, 2021
Inside Elections	Lean R	April 23, 2021
Sabato's Crystal Ball	Likely R	April 15, 2021

=== Results ===
Susan Wright came in first in the primary with 15,077 (19.2%) votes to Ellzey's 10,865 (13.8%) and Sanchez's 10,518 (13.4%). On Sunday, May 2, 2021, Sanchez conceded the race to Ellzey. Since no candidate received a majority, the top two candidates, Wright and Ellzey, proceeded to a runoff.

2021 Texas's 6th congressional district special election
Party	Candidate	Votes	%
Republican	Susan Wright	15,077	19.21
Republican	Jake Ellzey	10,865	13.85
Democratic	Jana Sanchez	10,518	13.40
Republican	Brian Harrison	8,485	10.81
Democratic	Shawn Lassiter	6,973	8.89
Republican	John Anthony Castro	4,321	5.51
Democratic	Tammy Allison Holloway	4,240	5.40
Democratic	Lydia Bean	2,923	3.72
Republican	Michael Wood	2,509	3.20
Republican	Michael Ballantine	2,225	2.84
Republican	Dan Rodimer	2,088	2.66
Democratic	Daryl J. Eddings Sr.	1,654	2.11
Republican	Mike Egan	1,544	1.97
Democratic	Patrick Moses	1,189	1.52
Democratic	Manuel R. Salazar III	1,120	1.43
Republican	Sery Kim	889	1.13
Republican	Travis Rodermund	460	0.59
Independent	Adrian Mizher	351	0.45
Democratic	Brian K. Stephenson	271	0.35
Libertarian	Phil Gray	265	0.34
Democratic	Matthew Hinterlong	252	0.32
Republican	Jennifer Garcia Sharon	150	0.19
Democratic	Chris Suprun	102	0.13
Total votes		78,471	100.00

== Runoff ==
A runoff was held on July 27 between Susan Wright and Jake Ellzey. In the campaign prior to the runoff, Wright relied heavily on Trump's endorsement in order to further her candidacy, but was considered to have run a poor campaign. The Club for Growth spent heavily in the runoff, buying US$1.2 million in advertisements that supported Wright and attacked Ellzey. The heavily negative tone taken by the Club for Growth ads towards Ellzey frustrated many Republican officials, some of whom backed Ellzey in protest. Ellzey's campaign also engaged in strategies that were suspected as being designed to appeal to Democrats, with him declaring himself a "champion of public education" in text messages to Democratic-leaning potential voters, as well as noting that Wright was endorsed by former president Donald Trump. Defending Main Street, a Super PAC that was supporting Ellzey, targeted Democrats with advertisements, but Ellzey himself denied that he was specifically targeting Democrats, instead claiming that his statements were designed to be bipartisan.

=== Predictions ===
Source	Ranking	As of
The Cook Political Report	Solid R	July 9, 2021
Inside Elections	Solid R	June 18, 2021
Sabato's Crystal Ball	Safe R	July 21, 2021

=== Endorsements ===
Jake Ellzey (R)

Executive Branch Officials

- Rick Perry, 47th governor of Texas (2000–2015) and 14th United States Secretary of Energy (2017–2019)

U.S. Representatives

- Joe Barton, U.S. Representative (TX-06) (1985–2019)
- Dan Crenshaw, U.S. Representative (TX-02) (2019–present)

Newspapers

- The Dallas Morning News
- Fort Worth Star-Telegram
Susan Wright (R)

Executive Branch Officials

- Donald Trump, 45th President of the United States (2017–2021)

U.S. Senators

- Ted Cruz, United States Senator from Texas (2013–present)

U.S. Representatives

- Jodey Arrington, U.S. Representative (TX-19) (2017–present)
- Andy Biggs, U.S. Representative (AZ-5) (2017–present)
- Lance Gooden, U.S. Representative (TX-5) (2019–present)
- Kay Granger, U.S. Representative (TX-12) (1997–2025)
- Troy Nehls, U.S. Representative (TX-22) (2021–present)
- Chip Roy, U.S. Representative (TX-21) (2019–present)
- Elise Stefanik, U.S. Representative (NY-21) (2015–present)

State Legislators

- Stephanie Klick, state representative (2013–2025)
- Matt Krause, state representative (2013–2023)
- Tony Tinderholt, state representative (2015–present)

Other Individuals

- Betsy Price, Mayor of Fort Worth, Texas (2011–2021)

Organizations

- Club for Growth Action
- Elevate PAC
- New York Young Republican Club
- Republican Party of Texas
- Susan B. Anthony List
- Texas Federation of College Republicans
- VIEW PAC

=== Polling ===
Poll source	Date(s) administered	Sample size	Margin of error	Susan Wright (R)	Jake Ellzey (R)	Undecided
American Viewpoint (R) (Note: Poll sponsored by Wright's campaign)	July 19–21, 2021	400 (LV)	± 4.9%	44%	34%	12%
American Viewpoint (R)	June 1–3, 2021	400 (LV)	± 4.9%	49%	34%	11%

Hypothetical polling

Susan Wright vs. Jana Sanchez

Poll source	Date(s) administered	Sample size	Margin of error	Susan Wright (R)	Jana Sanchez (D)	Undecided
Data for Progress (D)	April 5–12, 2021	344 (LV)	± 5.0%	53%	43%	5%

=== Results ===
2021 Texas' 6th congressional district special election runoff
Party	Candidate	Votes	%
Republican	Jake Ellzey	20,837	53.27
Republican	Susan Wright	18,279	46.73
Total votes		39,116	100.00
Republican hold			

==== By county ====
County	Jake Ellzey Republican		Susan Wright Republican		Margin		Total votes
County	#	%	#	%	#	%	Total votes
Ellis	6,784	56.68%	5,185	43.32%	1,599	13.36%	11,969
Navarro	1,398	43.87%	1,789	56.13%	-391	-12.27%	3,187
Tarrant (part)	12,655	52.82%	11,305	47.18%	1,350	5.63%	23,960
Totals	20,837	53.27%	18,279	46.73%	2,558	6.54%	39,116

== Notes ==
Partisan clients
