= Jake Ellzey =

American politician (born 1970)

- Official portrait, 2021

Member of the U.S. House of Representatives from Texas's 6th district
- Incumbent
- Assumed office July 27, 2021 (Note: Ellzey's official service begins on the date of the special election, while he was not sworn in until July 30, 2021.)
- Preceded by: Ron Wright

Member of the Texas House of Representatives from the 10th district
- In office January 12, 2021 – July 30, 2021
- Preceded by: John Wray
- Succeeded by: Brian Harrison

Personal details
- Born: John Kevin Ellzey; January 24, 1970 (age 56) Amarillo, Texas, U.S.
- Party: Republican
- Spouse: Shelby Hoebeke
- Children: 2
- Education: United States Naval Academy (BS)
- Website: House website Campaign website

Military service
- Allegiance: United States
- Branch/service: United States Navy
- Years of service: 1992–2012
- Rank: Commander
- Battles/wars: Iraq War; War in Afghanistan
- Ellzey's voice Ellzey commemorating the 150th anniversary of Ennis, Texas. Recorded June 8, 2022

John Kevin "Jake" Ellzey Sr. (born January 24, 1970) is an American politician and former military officer serving as the U.S. representative for Texas's 6th congressional district since 2021. A member of the Republican Party, he previously served as a commissioner for the Texas Veterans Commission and later as a member of the Texas House of Representatives for the 10th district from January to July 2021. He served in the United States Navy as a fighter pilot, completing tours in Afghanistan and Iraq.

== Early life and education ==
Ellzey was born in Amarillo, Texas, and raised in Perryton. He earned a Bachelor of Science degree in political science from the United States Naval Academy in 1992. Ellzey was deployed nine times in his 20 years in the Navy before becoming a commercial airline pilot.

== Career ==
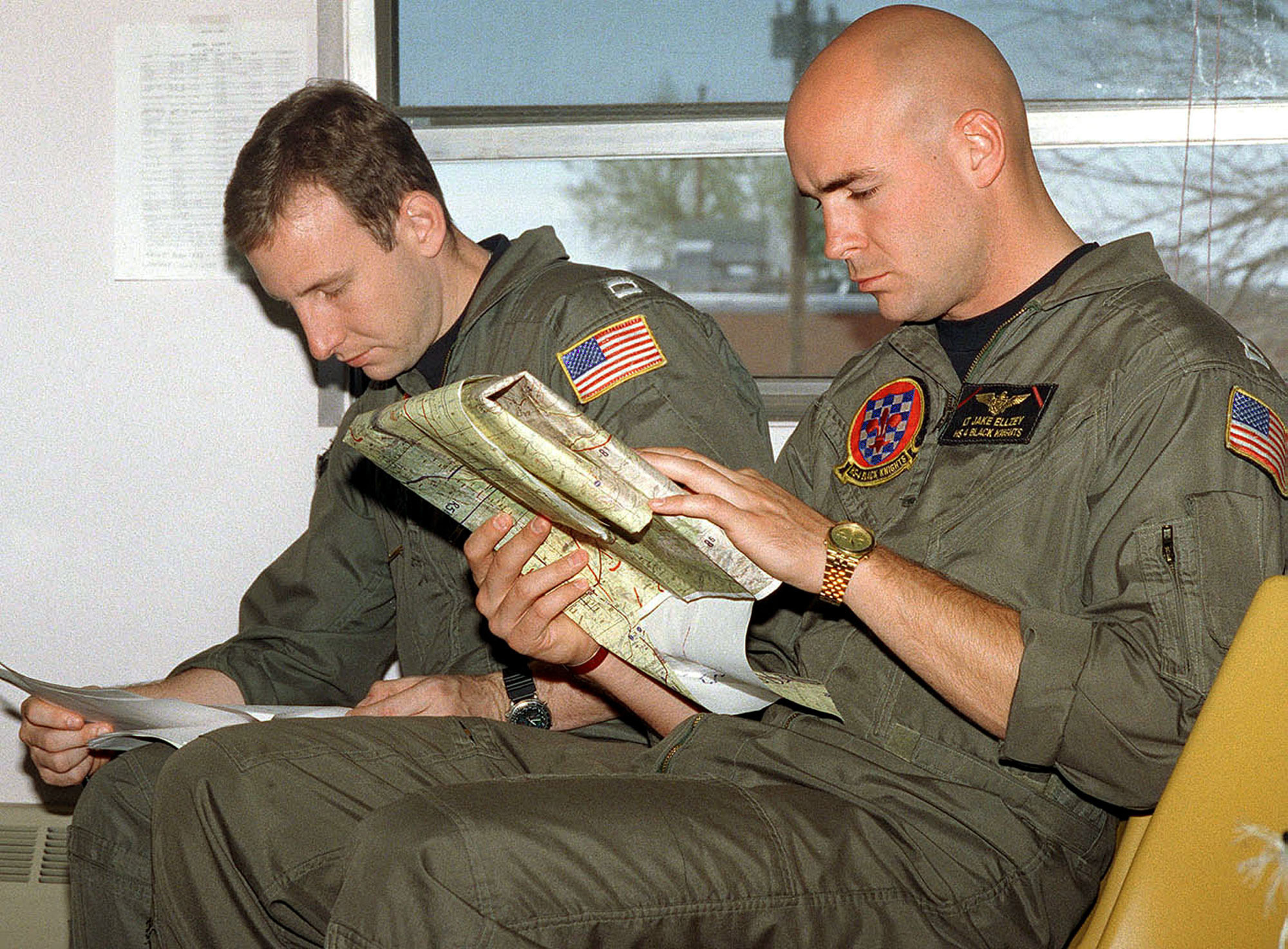
Lieutenant Ellzey studies a map during a mission in 1997.

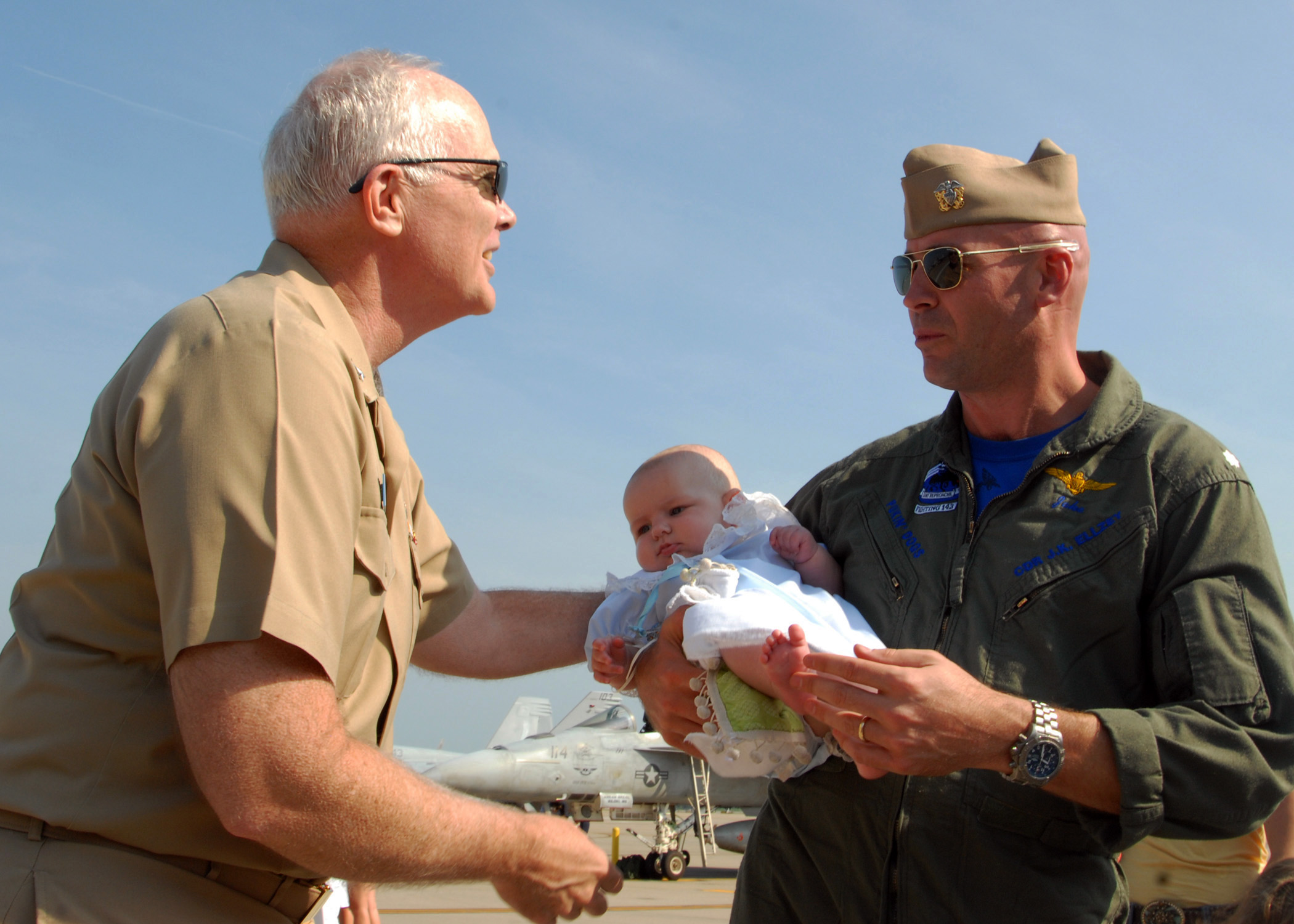
Ellzey meeting with Rear Admiral Richard O'Hanlon in 2009

Since retiring from the Navy, Ellzey has worked as a pilot for Southwest Airlines and as a consultant. He was also a social aide in the White House Office during the Bush administration. From 2012 to 2018, he was one of five commissioners of the Texas Veterans Commission.

In 2018, Ellzey was an unsuccessful candidate for Texas's 6th congressional district. During his campaign, he was endorsed by The Dallas Morning News. He placed second in the Republican primary, behind Ron Wright, who won the general election.

Ellzey was elected to the Texas House of Representatives in 2020. He took office on January 12, 2021. He resigned in July 2021 to take his seat in Congress. Governor Greg Abbott set August 31, 2021, as the special election date for the Texas State House of Representatives District 10 seat that Ellzey vacated. Republican Brian Harrison won the seat, defeating John Wray.

== U.S. House of Representatives ==
=== Elections ===
==== 2021 special ====
On February 26, 2021, Ellzey announced his candidacy in Texas's 6th congressional district special election to replace Ron Wright, who died in office on February 7. In the 23-candidate nonpartisan blanket primary, Ellzey finished second to Wright's widow Susan, who had been endorsed by former President Donald Trump, and 354 votes ahead of Democrat Jana Sanchez. On May 2, Sanchez conceded to Ellzey. Governor Greg Abbott set July 27 as the special election runoff date. Ellzey defeated Wright in the runoff, 53% to 47%. He was sworn in on July 30, 2021.

==== 2022 ====
Ellzey defeated James Buford and Bill Payne in the Republican primary election, and was re-elected unopposed in the general election.

==== 2024 ====
Ellzey received support from AIPAC and Pro-Israel America in his re-election campaign. He defeated Democrat John Love III, a former member of the Midland city council, in the general election with 66.4% of the vote.

=== Tenure ===
At the start of the 118th Congress, Ellzey supported Rep. Kevin McCarthy in his bid for the House speakership, voting for him in all 15 rounds.

Ellzey later opposed the October 2023 vote to remove McCarthy as speaker, which ultimately succeeded 216–210. In the succeeding election for the next speaker, Ellzey was one of 18 Republicans who voted against Jim Jordan's nomination for Speaker of the House all three times. He would ultimately support the new nominee, Mike Johnson, in the fourth and final ballot.

Ellzey was part of a bipartisan congressional delegation that visited Tel Aviv in June 2024, meeting with Israeli prime minister Benjamin Netanyahu and defense minister Yoav Gallant.

=== Committee assignments ===
For the 119th Congress:

- Committee on Appropriations
  - Subcommittee on Defense (vice chair)
  - Subcommittee on Interior, Environment, and Related Agencies
  - Subcommittee on Labor, Health and Human Services, Education, and Related Agencies
- Committee on Small Business
  - Subcommittee on Contracting and Infrastructure
  - Subcommittee on Rural Development, Energy, and Supply Chains (chairman)

=== Caucus memberships ===
- Republican Main Street Partnership
- Congressional Caucus on Turkey and Turkish Americans
- Congressional Western Caucus

== Political positions ==
=== Texas Central Railway ===
Ellzey described the Texas Central Railway bullet train project as "all one big grift" and applauded the Trump administration’s decision to pull their 64 million dollar grant from the project.

=== Israel ===
Ellzey voted to provide Israel with support following 2023 Hamas attack on Israel.

=== Veterans ===
The PACT ACT, which expanded Veterans Affairs benefits to veterans exposed to toxic chemicals during their military service, received a "nay" from Ellzey.

=== Abortion ===
In January 2025, Ellzey co-sponsored fellow GOP House member Eric Burlison's bill recognizing personhood as starting at conception.

== Electoral history ==
=== 2018 ===
Republican primary results, 2018
Party	Candidate	Votes	%
Republican	Ron Wright	20,659	45.1
Republican	Jake Ellzey	9,956	21.7
Republican	Ken Cope	3,527	7.7
Republican	Shannon Dubberly	2,880	6.3
Republican	Mark Mitchell	2,141	4.7
Republican	Troy Ratterree	1,854	4.0
Republican	Kevin Harrison	1,768	3.9
Republican	Deborah Gagliardi	1,674	3.7
Republican	Thomas Dillingham	543	1.2
Republican	Shawn Dandridge	517	1.1
Republican	Mel Hassell	266	0.6
Total votes		45,785	100.0

Republican primary runoff results, 2018
Party	Candidate	Votes	%
Republican	Ron Wright	12,747	52.2
Republican	Jake Ellzey	11,686	47.8
Total votes		24,433	100

=== 2020 ===
Election results:

District	Democratic		Republican		Libertarian		Total		Result		
District	District 10	-	-	65,062	75.83%	20,733	24.17%	85,795	Result	100.00%	Republican hold

=== 2021 ===
Texas's 6th congressional district special election, 2021
Party	Candidate	Votes	%
Republican	Susan Wright	15,052	19.21
Republican	Jake Ellzey	10,851	13.85
Democratic	Jana Sanchez	10,497	13.39
Republican	Brian Harrison	8,476	10.81
Democratic	Shawn Lassiter	6,964	8.89
Republican	John Anthony Castro	4,321	5.51
Democratic	Tammy Allison Holloway	4,238	5.41
Democratic	Lydia Bean	2,920	3.73
Republican	Michael Wood	2,503	3.19
Republican	Michael Ballantine	2,224	2.84
Republican	Dan Rodimer	2,086	2.66
Democratic	Daryl J. Eddings Sr.	1,652	2.11
Republican	Mike Egan	1,543	1.97
Democratic	Patrick Moses	1,189	1.52
Democratic	Manuel R. Salazar III	1,119	1.43
Republican	Sery Kim	888	1.13
Republican	Travis Rodermund	460	0.59
Independent	Adrian Mizher	351	0.45
Democratic	Brian K. Stephenson	271	0.35
Libertarian	Phil Gray	265	0.34
Democratic	Matthew Hinterlong	252	0.32
Republican	Jennifer Garcia Sharon	150	0.19
Democratic	Chris Suprun	102	0.13
Total votes		78,374	100

=== 2021 (runoff) ===
2021 Texas' 6th congressional district special election runoff
Party	Candidate	Votes	%
Republican	Jake Ellzey	20,837	53.27
Republican	Susan Wright	18,279	46.73
Total votes		39,116	100.00
Republican hold			

=== 2022 ===
2022 Texas' 6th congressional district election
Party	Candidate	Votes	%
Republican	Jake Ellzey (incumbent)	149,321	100.00
Total votes		149,321	100.00
Republican hold			

=== 2024 ===
2024 Texas's 6th congressional district election
Party	Candidate	Votes	%
Republican	Jake Ellzey (incumbent)	188,119	65.7
Democratic	John Love III	98,319	34.3
Total votes		286,438	100.0
Republican hold			

== Personal life ==
Ellzey and his wife Shelby have two children. They live near Midlothian, Texas.

U.S. House of Representatives
Preceded by Ron Wright	Member of the U.S. House of Representatives from Texas's 6th congressional district 2021–present	Incumbent
U.S. order of precedence (ceremonial)
Preceded by Melanie Stansbury	United States representatives by seniority 283rd	Succeeded by Shontel Brown
