= John de Castro =

American psychologist

- Born: John Manuel de Castro
- Education: Northeastern University; University of Massachusetts
- Known for: Research on human eating behavior
- Awards: 11th John M. Kinney Award for Nutrition and Metabolism (2007)
- Scientific career
- Fields: Psychology
- Institutions: Georgia State University; University of Texas at El Paso; Sam Houston State University
- Thesis: Meal patterns: some ontogenetic, endocrinological, and neurological considerations (1974)
- Doctoral advisor: Saul Balagura

John M. de Castro is an American psychologist who served as founding Dean of the College of Humanities and Social Sciences at Sam Houston State University from 2006 to 2013. Previously, he had served as professor and chair of the Department of Psychology at the University of Texas at El Paso, where he had begun teaching in August 2003. Prior to that, from 1974 to August 2003, he taught at Georgia State University. Much of his research is focused on eating behavior in humans. He received the 11th John M. Kinney Award for Nutrition and Metabolism in recognition of his research.
