= John Anthony Castro =

American tax return preparer

- Education: Texas A&M International University (BA); University of New Mexico (JD); Georgetown University (LLM); Harvard Business School (Certificate)
- Occupation: Tax advisor
- Known for: Disqualification clause advocacy in the 2024 U.S. presidential election; Alan Dixon v Commissioner of Internal Revenue and its related cases
- Political party: Republican (2020–present)
- Other political affiliations: Democratic (before 2020)
- Board member of: Harvard Business School Club of Washington, D.C. (former)

John Anthony Castro (born 1983) is an American tax advisor from Texas. He is known as the most prolific advocate for disqualifying Donald Trump from the 2024 U.S. presidential election under the Fourteenth Amendment to the United States Constitution, and for his involvement in Dixon v Commissioner and its cases. In 2024, Castro was convicted of 33 counts of tax fraud as a result of filing fraudulent returns through his tax preparation service, Castro & Co.

== Early life and education ==
Castro earned a bachelor's degree from Texas A&M International University in Laredo, Texas, before receiving a J.D. from the University of New Mexico and LLM from Georgetown University. He later graduated from the Owner/President Management Program at Harvard Business School.

He was banned from participating in Georgetown University Law Center's job fair as a student and then later on as an employer over what the university claimed were "deliberate misrepresentations on his resume". Castro disputed the allegations and sued Georgetown over them, though the lawsuit was dismissed on a jurisdictional issue.

== Career ==
Though he has described himself, and has been described, as an attorney, Castro has never been licensed to practice law.

In 2013, shortly after completing his LLM, Castro briefly worked for Gudorf Law Group of Dayton, Ohio, before suing the firm for allegedly defaming him. The lawsuit was dismissed.

=== Castro & Co. ===
In about 2016, Castro established his tax preparation service, Castro & Co., in Orlando, Florida, later relocating it to Texas. He did contingency fee refund work, a practice in which a tax preparer retains, as payment, a portion of the tax refund he is able to secure on behalf of a client.

Castro successfully marketed his home-based tax consultancy to clients around the world and, in one two-year period, filed nearly 2,000 tax returns on behalf of taxpayers in multiple countries.

==== The Dixon cases ====
At Castro & Co., Castro issued "legal opinions" to United States expatriates living in Australia — some of whom were employees of investment firm Dixon Advisory — on ways they could exclude certain earnings from being reported on their U.S. tax returns. The company's CEO Alan C. Dixon, an Australian citizen who had taken up residence in the United States to invest in the New Jersey real estate market, replaced his own tax accountancy, PwC, with Castro & Co.

Castro amended the tax returns PwC filed for Dixon to claim foreign tax credit on Dixon's franking credits, allowing Dixon to transform his tax liability into a $3,268,930 refund due to him from the U.S. Government. Upon receiving the revised returns Castro prepared, the IRS initiated an audit of Dixon, assessed penalties against him, and seized his refund. Dixon's lawsuit against the U.S. Government to recover his refund was the subject of the United States Tax Court case Alan Dixon v Commissioner of Internal Revenue, described by Tax Notes Federal as "a cautionary tale of cross-border tax compliance complexities". According to Justia's summary of the case:

During the litigation, it became clear that Dixon had not personally signed his name on the 2017 amended returns—the tax preparer [Castro] had signed Dixon’s name—and no authorizing power-of-attorney documentation accompanied the amended returns.

Because federal law prevents a taxpayer from suing for a refund without having previously submitted a “duly filed” claim to the IRS, and the 2017 amended returns were not “duly filed” due to the lack of a proper signature, Dixon's case against the U.S. Government was dismissed leaving him, according to the Australian Financial Review, with "nought, aside from penalties and legal fees". The Dixon case was one of a "long-line" of cases adjudicated that involved Castro signing his name in place or on behalf of his Australia-resident clients. Carlton Smith, writing in Tax Notes Federal, noted that "in all Castro cases" courts held that "the signature requirement mandating that the taxpayer sign is statutory and not subject to waiver".

==== Tax fraud conviction ====
In January 2024, the United States Department of Justice unsealed a 33-count grand jury indictment against Castro, culminating a years-long investigation into Castro & Co. related to the filing of fraudulent tax returns. Castro was arrested by special agents of IRS Criminal Investigations on January 9, 2024.

United States Attorney Leigha Simonton said that Castro's crimes were "stunning" for their "brazenness" and involved him promising higher tax refunds to clients than they could legitimately receive, padding their tax returns with bogus deductions, and then keeping half of the amount refunded to the client by the government for himself. According to prosecutors, "for one client, who made approximately $103,000 in income, Mr. Castro claimed over $90,000 in deductions related to unreimbursed employee expenses" while, with another client he "deducted over $26,000 in expenses that he claimed related to a nascent cupcake business that had generated only $250 in revenue". Prosecutors went on to allege that Castro "often acted in a highly vindictive manner when questioned or challenged by clients or others, often berating individuals in emails, threatening legal actions, or by filing amended tax returns, without clients’ permission or knowledge, that removed all deductions, causing the taxpayer-victim to then owe the IRS tens of thousands of dollars". It is alleged that Castro's enterprise resulted in more than $15.5 million worth of tax losses to the United States.

Castro denied any wrongdoing and explained that he had already taken responsibility for what he said were past instances in which he'd misinterpreted the tax code and had thus far paid back $700,000 to the United States. At trial, Castro's attorneys argued that his application of the tax code involved "aggressive" and "unconventional" legal positions but did not rise to the level of "willful violations of the law".

In May 2024, Castro was convicted of all 33 charges and was remanded into custody pending sentencing. The following October, he was sentenced to more than 15 years in prison.

=== Euclid University ===
In 2016, Castro was awarded a teaching appointment at Euclid University, becoming the supervising faculty member for the university's Master of Laws program in taxation.

== Politics ==
=== Campaigns ===
Between 2004 and 2021, Castro unsuccessfully stood for election to Webb County Court of Commissioners, U.S. Senate, and U.S. House of Representatives.

In 2022, Castro launched an unsuccessful run for President of the United States as a Republican in the 2024 United States presidential election. According to Castro, he ran to attempt to achieve legal standing to disqualify Donald Trump from seeking reelection under the 14th Amendment. He began filing pro se lawsuits to block Trump in early 2023.

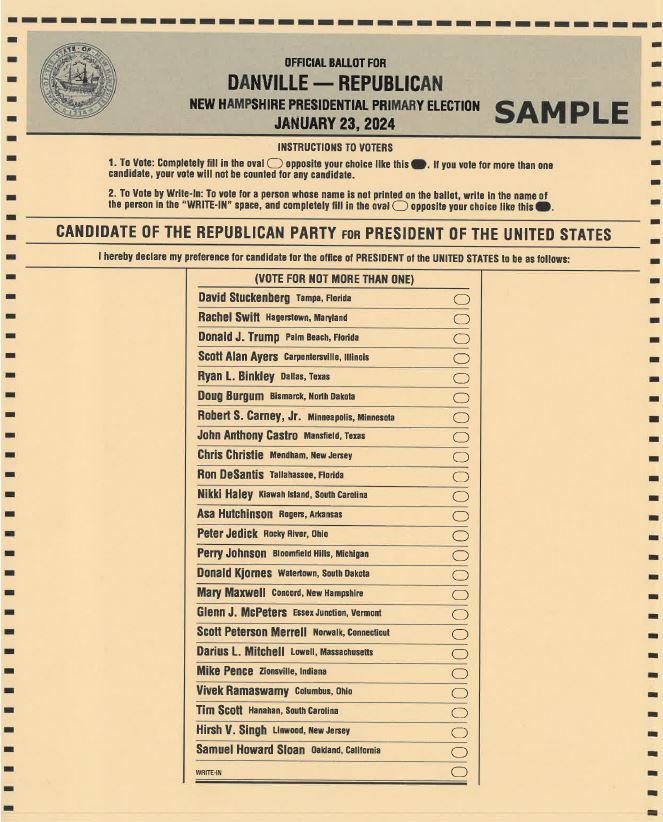
Castro was a ballot-listed candidate in the 2024 New Hampshire Republican primary.

Castro ultimately filed dozens of unsuccessful federal lawsuits in courts across the country seeking to have Trump disqualified and became, according to the New York Times and NPR, the "most prolific" advocate for disqualification. By the end of the year, more than a dozen of his cases had either been dismissed or non-suited, with additional dismissals that followed in 2024. Appellate panels in the United States Court of Appeals for the First Circuit and the United States Court of Appeals for the District of Columbia Circuit both rejected his appeals, while the U.S. Supreme Court refused to consider his petition for a writ of certiorari.

=== Claims of harassment by Donald Trump ===
In 2022, according to the New Hampshire Union Leader, Castro claimed that the Central Intelligence Agency (CIA) attempted to plant listening devices in his automobile on orders of Donald Trump. The following year, Castro sued Trump for $180 million, alleging that the former president was engaged in a conspiracy with the IRS and CIA to “monitor, surveil, and harass” him. He added several others to the lawsuit, including IRS criminal investigators, attorneys, a senior CIA official, staff of the Pine Gap satellite surveillance base, and a John Doe defendant, all of whom he alleged conspired with Donald Trump to harass him. Castro's lawsuit was dismissed.

=== Views ===
In 2008, Castro denounced the "corruption, lies, theft and war" of the George W. Bush administration in an opinion piece for the Houston Chronicle. In 2021, according to Politico, Castro said he wanted to "return to the compassionate conservatism of the Bush era".

== Personal life ==
Castro is a resident of Mansfield, Texas. He has served on the board of directors of the Harvard Business School Club of Washington, D.C.

== Works ==
=== Books ===
- Castro, John (2005). My Plan for Laredo. Cafe Press.
- Castro, John & Hunt, Tiffany (2018). International Taxation In Plain English. CreateSpace.

=== Journal articles ===
- Castro, John (2018). "U.S. Tax Treatment of Australian Superannuation". Nevada Law Journal.

=== Patents ===
- US patent 11397995, John Anthony Castro, "Tax planning using video-based graphical user interface and artificial intelligence", issued July 2, 2022
- US patent 11847707, John Anthony Castro, "Tax planning using video-based graphical user interface and artificial intelligence", issued November 29, 2023

== Electoral history ==
Webb County (Texas) Commissioners Court Position 3, Democratic primary (2004)
| Party | Candidate | Votes | % |
|---|---|---|---|
| Democratic | Jerry Garza | 3,038 | 30.4 |
| Democratic | Felix Velasquez | 2,611 | 26.1 |
| Democratic | Roque Vela | 2,420 | 24.2 |
| Democratic | J. "Cuate" Mendoza | 1,498 | 15.0 |
| Democratic | John Anthony Castro | 437 | 4.4 |
| Total votes | | 10,004 | 100 |

United States Senator from Texas, Republican primary (2020)
| Party | Candidate | Votes | % |
|---|---|---|---|
| Republican | John Cornyn (incumbent) | 1,470,669 | 76.04 |
| Republican | Dwayne Stovall | 231,104 | 11.95 |
| Republican | Mark Yancey | 124,864 | 6.46 |
| Republican | John Anthony Castro | 86,916 | 4.49 |
| Republican | Virgil Bierschwale | 20,494 | 1.06 |
| Total votes | | 1,934,047 | 100.0 |

Texas' 6th congressional district, special primary election (2021)
| Party | Candidate | Votes | % |
|---|---|---|---|
| Republican | Susan Wright | 15,052 | 19.2 |
| Republican | Jake Ellzey | 10,851 | 13.8 |
| Democratic | Jana Lynne Sanchez | 10,497 | 13.4 |
| Republican | Brian Harrison | 8,476 | 10.8 |
| Democratic | Shawn Lassiter | 6,964 | 8.9 |
| Republican | John Anthony Castro | 4,321 | 5.5 |
| Democratic | Tammy Allison | 4,238 | 5.4 |
| Democratic | Lydia Bean | 2,920 | 3.7 |
| | All others | 15,055 | 19.0 |
| Total votes | | 78,374 | 100 |

United States President, Republican primary (2024) (Note: Includes vote totals from Alaska, Alabama, Arkansas, California, Colorado, Connecticut, D.C., Georgia, Hawaii, Iowa, Idaho, Illinois, Indiana, Kentucky, Massachusetts, Maine, Michigan, Minnesota, Mississippi, North Carolina, North Dakota, New Hampshire, Nevada, New York, Oklahoma, Pennsylvania, Puerto Rico, Rhode Island, South Carolina, Tennessee, Texas, Utah, Virginia, Vermont, Washington, and Wisconsin. Excludes Montana, New Mexico, and South Dakota. No vote totals reported for Guam or Wyoming.)
| Party | Candidate | Votes | % |
|---|---|---|---|
| Republican | Donald Trump | 16,172,484 | 75.83 |
| Republican | Nikki Haley | 4,356,256 | 20.42 |
| Republican | Ron DeSantis | 352,488 | 1.65 |
| Republican | Chris Christie | 136,867 | 0.64 |
| Republican | Vivek Ramaswamy | 95,581 | 0.45 |
| Republican | Ryan Binkley | 28,147 | 0.13 |
| Republican | Asa Hutchinson | 21,943 | 0.10 |
| Republican | Perry Johnson | 4,051 | 0.02 |
| Republican | Tim Scott | 1,598 | 0.01 |
| Republican | Doug Burgum | 502 | 0.00 |
| Republican | John Anthony Castro | 501 | 0.00 |
| Republican | Joe Biden (write-in) | 497 | 0.00 |
| Republican | Mike Pence | 404 | 0.00 |
| Republican | Robert F. Kennedy, Jr. (write-in) | 205 | 0.00 |
| Republican | Vermin Supreme (write-in) | 3 | 0.00 |
| Republican | All others | 156,805 | 0.74 |
| Total votes | | 21,328,332 | 100.0 |
