= The Politics of Evangelical Identity =

2014 book

- Author: Lydia Bean
- Language: English
- Genre: Ethnography
- Publisher: Princeton University Press
- Publication date: August 24, 2014
- Publication place: United States
- ISBN: 9780691161303
- OCLC: 891815400

The Politics of Evangelical Identity: Local Churches and Partisan Divides in the United States and Canada is a book by Lydia Bean first published by Princeton University Press in 2014. A work of ethnography, the book draws on Bean's research in Evangelical communities in Canada and the United States. Bean found that the American Evangelicals she interviewed identified as highly patriotic, while Canadian congregants were more hesitant about engaging in political campaigning.

In a 2016 article in The New Republic about Ted Cruz, Donald Trump, and the evangelical vote, Bean stated, "Evangelicals who don’t go to church very much but identify as Christian, with Christian nationalistic rhetoric, but aren’t very well formed or advised by Christian community leaders—they’re going for Trump. I think Ted Cruz is picking up the older, more observant people who are theologically and politically conservative, the people who actually go to church every week."
