= Ron Wright (politician) =

American politician (1953–2021)

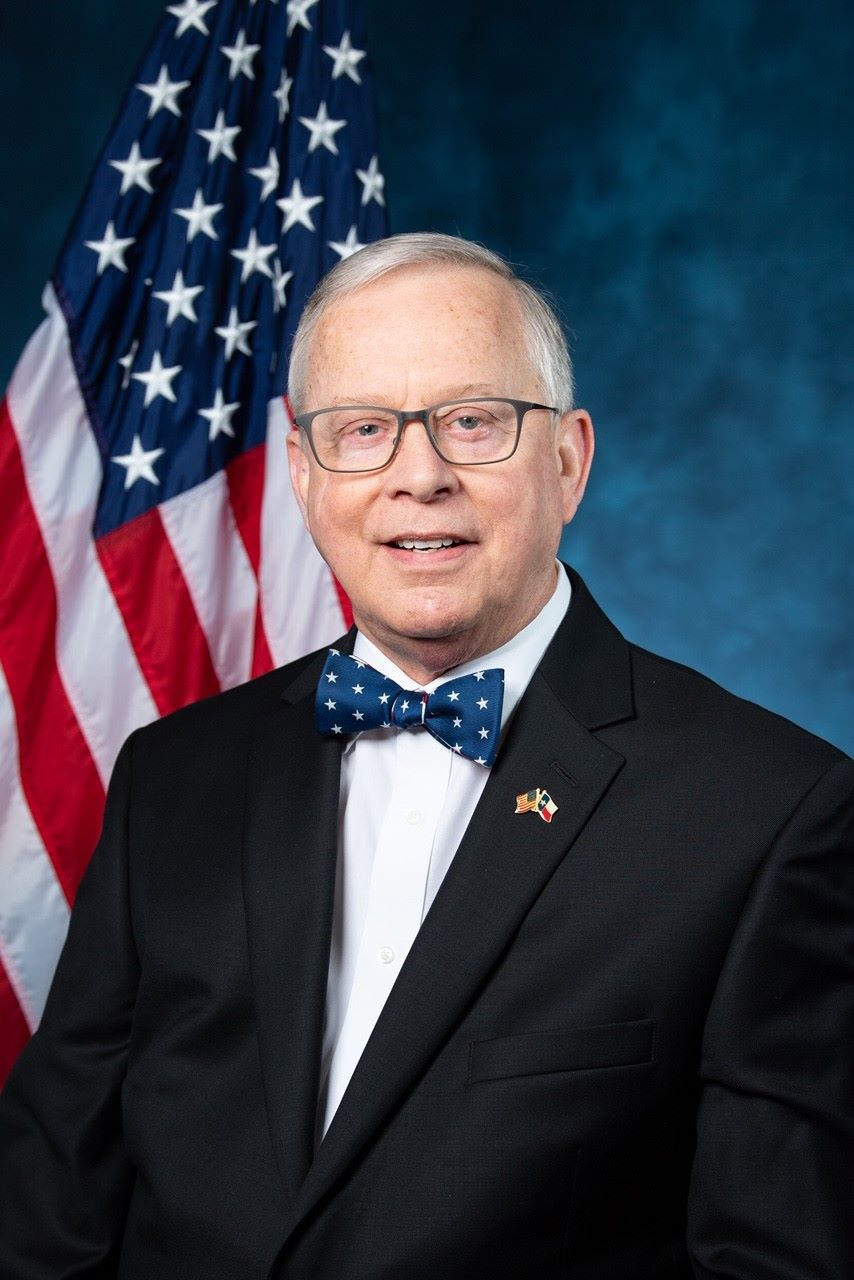
- Official portrait, 2019

Member of the U.S. House of Representatives from Texas's 6th district
- In office January 3, 2019 – February 7, 2021
- Preceded by: Joe Barton
- Succeeded by: Jake Ellzey

Personal details
- Born: Ronald Jack Wright; April 8, 1953 Jacksonville, Texas, U.S.
- Died: February 7, 2021 (aged 67) Dallas, Texas, U.S.
- Cause of death: COVID-19
- Party: Republican
- Spouse: Susan Wright
- Children: 3
- Education: University of Texas at Arlington

Ronald Jack Wright (April 8, 1953 – February 7, 2021) was an American politician who served as the U.S. representative for Texas's 6th congressional district from 2019 until his death in 2021. He was a member of the Republican Party.

After serving on Arlington's city council and as tax assessor-collector for Tarrant County, Wright was elected to the House of Representatives in 2018 and reelected in 2020. Before his death from COVID-19 on February 7, 2021, Wright had been diagnosed with lung cancer in June 2019.

== Early life and education ==
Ronald Jack Wright was born on April 8, 1953, in Jacksonville, Texas, the son of Peggy Darlene (Powar) and George Willis Wright. He grew up in Azle, Texas, graduating from Azle High School in 1971. He then attended the University of Texas at Arlington for two years, studying history, psychology, and political science.

== Career ==
Before entering politics Wright worked at Ceramic Cooling Tower, Inc. He wrote several op-eds for the Fort Worth Star-Telegram in the 1990s, recommending public executions and display of corpses as a deterrent to crimes.

Wright served on the Arlington City Council from 2000 to 2008 and as Mayor Pro-Tem of Arlington from 2004 to 2008. He then served as district director for Congressman Joe Barton from 2000 to 2009. From 2009 to 2011, Wright was Barton's Chief of Staff. Wright was appointed Tarrant County Tax Assessor-Collector in 2011, serving until 2018.

In 2014, Wright's office added the motto "In God We Trust" to its stationery, including tax assessment envelopes and tax statements.

== U.S. House of Representatives ==
=== Elections ===
==== 2018 ====
In 2018, Wright ran for the United States House of Representatives in Texas's 6th congressional district to succeed Barton, who had announced that he would not seek reelection after coming to national attention again when sexually explicit photos that he had shared with women surfaced online. Wright finished in first place in the primary election, but did not achieve the 50% majority required to avoid a runoff. He faced Jake Ellzey in the runoff election, and won with 52% of the vote. In the general election, Wright defeated Democrat Jana Lynne Sanchez.

==== 2020 ====
Wright was reelected in 2020, defeating attorney Stephen Daniel. His death triggered a special election in 2021.

=== Tenure ===
In June 2019, Reproaction, an abortion rights advocacy group, released a video that showed Wright stating women should "absolutely" be punished for performing self-managed abortions, as "they committed murder".

In December 2020, Wright was one of 126 Republican members of the House of Representatives to sign an amicus brief in support of Texas v. Pennsylvania, a lawsuit filed at the United States Supreme Court contesting the results of the 2020 presidential election, in which Joe Biden defeated incumbent Donald Trump. The Supreme Court declined to hear the case on the basis that Texas lacked standing under Article III of the Constitution to challenge the results of an election held by another state. Wright later voted against certifying Arizona's and Pennsylvania's electoral votes in an effort to deny the final mechanism that would legally certify Biden's victory. Both votes occurred after the storming of the United States Capitol.

=== Committee assignments ===
- Committee on Foreign Affairs
  - Subcommittee on Africa, Global Health, Global Human Rights and International Organizations
  - Subcommittee on Europe, Eurasia, Energy, and the Environment
- Committee on Education and Labor
  - Subcommittee on Health, Employment, Labor, and Pensions
  - Subcommittee on Workforce Protections

=== Caucus memberships ===
- Freedom Caucus

== Health issues and death ==
In July 2019, Wright announced he had been diagnosed with lung cancer. The next year, a series of complications with his radiation treatment led to his hospitalization.

On January 21, 2021, Wright announced he had tested positive for COVID-19. After he and his wife were hospitalized in Dallas for two weeks, Wright died from the virus on February 7. As a result, he became the first sitting member of Congress to die from the disease.

Lawmakers from both parties eulogized Wright after his death. Sanchez, his Democratic opponent in 2018, said that while she had her differences with Wright, "we both ran for Congress for the same reason: to fight for the people of North Texas. He served with passion while battling cancer and a deadly virus that has claimed far too many lives far too soon."

== Personal life ==
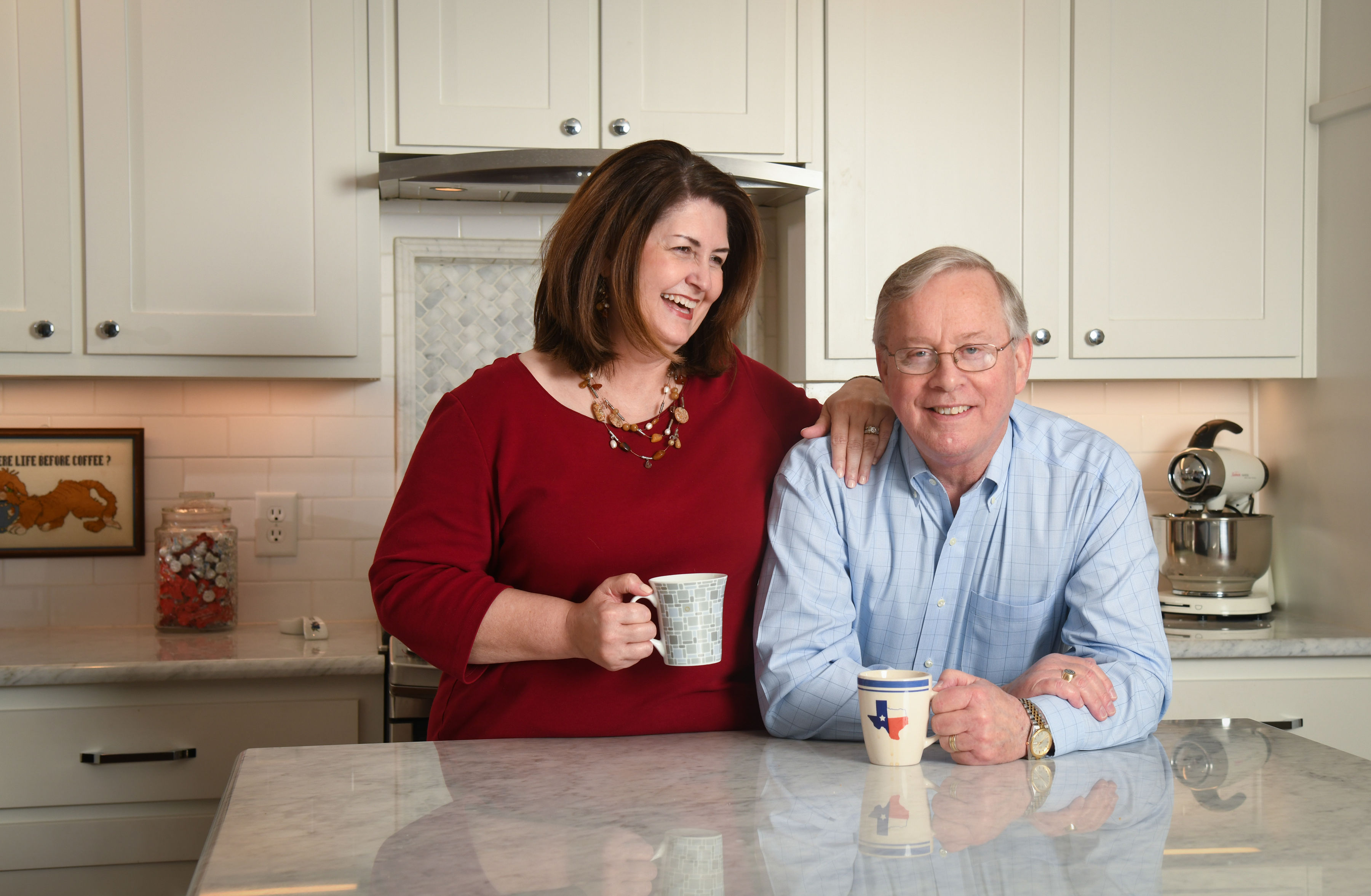
Wright with his wife Susan in 2018

Wright was married to Susan Wright, whom he met in June 2000 at the Texas GOP convention in Houston. She was a committeewoman for the Texas State Republican Executive Committee (SREC) for District 10. On February 24, 2021, she announced her candidacy in the special election to fill her husband's congressional seat. She was endorsed by former President Donald Trump and placed first in the May 1, 2021, primary, but did not receive 50% of the vote. Consequently, under Texas law, she advanced to a runoff against the second-place finisher, Republican State Representative Jake Ellzey of Waxahachie. On June 27, 2021, she lost the runoff to Ellzey. Wright was a Roman Catholic.

== Electoral history ==
=== 2018 ===
Republican primary results, 2018
Party	Candidate	Votes	%
Republican	Ron Wright	20,659	45.1
Republican	Jake Ellzey	9,956	21.7
Republican	Ken Cope	3,527	7.7
Republican	Shannon Dubberly	2,880	6.3
Republican	Mark Mitchell	2,141	4.7
Republican	Troy Ratterree	1,854	4.0
Republican	Kevin Harrison	1,768	3.9
Republican	Deborah Gagliardi	1,674	3.7
Republican	Thomas Dillingham	543	1.2
Republican	Shawn Dandridge	517	1.1
Republican	Mel Hassell	266	0.6
Total votes		45,785	100.0

Republican primary runoff results, 2018
Party	Candidate	Votes	%
Republican	Ron Wright	12,747	52.2
Republican	Jake Ellzey	11,686	47.8
Total votes		24,433	100

Texas's 6th congressional district, 2018
Party	Candidate	Votes	%
Republican	Ron Wright	135,961	53.1
Democratic	Jana Lynne Sanchez	116,350	44.4
Libertarian	Jason Harber	3,731	1.5
Total votes		256,042	100.0
Republican hold			

=== 2020 ===
Republican primary results, 2020
Party	Candidate	Votes	%
Republican	Ron Wright (incumbent)	55,759	100.0
Total votes		55,759	100.0

Texas's 6th congressional district, 2020
Party	Candidate	Votes	%
Republican	Ron Wright (incumbent)	179,507	52.8
Democratic	Stephen Daniel	149,530	44.0
Libertarian	Melanie Black	10,955	3.2
Total votes		339,992	100.0
Republican hold			

== See also ==
- List of members of the United States Congress who died in office (2000–present)#2020s
- Luke Letlow, U.S. Representative–elect from Louisiana who died from COVID-19

U.S. House of Representatives
Preceded by Joe Barton	Member of the U.S. House of Representatives from Texas's 6th congressional district 2019–2021	Succeeded by Jake Ellzey
