= Diane Patrick (Texas politician) =

Texas educator and state legislator

Diane Patrick (born January 9, 1946) is a politician from Texas. She currently serves as the District 3 representative on the Tarrant County College District Board of Trustees. Prior to that, she served as a Republican in the Texas House of Representatives for District 94 from 2007 to 2015, and on the Texas State Board of Education from 1992 to 1996.

== Personal life ==
Patrick earned a bachelor's degree from Baylor University with a major in elementary education. She then went on to the University of North Texas where she earned a master's of education and then a Ph.D. in philosophy/educational administration.

With her husband, Ned, she has two children, Craig and Claire. She lives in Arlington, Texas and is a member of the Junior League.

== Career ==
Patrick taught at Texas Christian University and at the College of Education at the University of Texas at Arlington. She was also a teacher in the Birdville, Richardson, and Waco Independent School Districts.

Patrick was formerly director of adult program services at CPC Millwood Hospital in Arlington, and the director of education, in-patient, and adolescent services at Bedford Meadows Hospital.

== Charitable works ==
Patrick has served on a number of boards, including the Texas Center for Educational Research, the Arlington Museum of Art, the Children's Advocacy Network, and the Texas Education Reform Foundation. She was the president of the Center for Professional Development and Technology's executive committee and a county co-chair for March of Dimes.

== Public service ==
From 1981 to 1992, Patrick served on the Arlington Independent School District Board of Trustees. From 1992 until 1996, she was on the Texas State Board of Education, and on May 6, 2017, she was elected to the Tarrant County College Board of Trustees. She beat the incumbent, Sean Hayward, in a special election for the District 3 seat with 68% of the vote. She had been appointed to a seat on the board in 2016.

From 2007 until 2015, Patrick was a Republican member of the Texas House of Representatives from District 94. To win the seat, she defeated 19 year incumbent Kent Grusendorf, who disparaged her as an "educrat." She opposed school vouchers, while Grusendorf supported them. While in the legislature, Patrick served on the Appropriations, Higher Education, and Rules & Resolutions Committees.
