= Tim O'Hare =

American politician (born 1969)

Tarrant County Judge
- Incumbent
- Assumed office January 1, 2023
- Preceded by: Glen Whitley
- Succeeded by: Alisa Simmons (elect)

Personal details
- Born: Timothy John O'Hare; 1969 (age 56–57) Dallas, Texas, U.S.
- Party: Republican
- Spouse: Christen (m. 2008)
- Education: University of Texas, Austin (BBA); Southern Methodist University (JD)

Timothy John O'Hare (born 1969) is an American lawyer and politician serving as the county judge of Tarrant County, elected in 2022. He previously served as chair of the county's Republican Party from 2016 to 2018 and as mayor of Farmers Branch from 2008 to 2011.

== Early life and education ==
O'Hare was born in Dallas in 1969 and raised in Farmers Branch by a single mother. He graduated from R. L. Turner High School in 1987 then earned a BBA in finance from University of Texas at Austin in 1991 and a Juris Doctor from Southern Methodist University's Dedman School of Law in 1995.

== Career ==
O'Hare previously owned a personal injury law firm.

In 2021, O'Hare and Leigh Wambsganss earned national acclaim among conservatives for their work co-founding the Southlake Families PAC, a group that promotes itself as "unapologetically rooted in Judeo-Christian values" and fought against the Carroll Independent School District's Cultural Competence Action Plan. The group raised hundreds of thousands of dollars to support a slate of school board candidates who promised to kill the plan and 70% of its endorsed candidates won their races.

=== Mayor of Farmers Branch ===
He was elected unopposed to the city council of Farmers Branch in 2005, then succeeded Bob Phelps as the city's mayor from 2008 until his resignation in 2011, when Bill Glancy became mayor.

In 2011, O'Hare proposed a referendum to make a new municipal Farmers Branch school district by merging the city's portion in the Carrolton-Farmers Branch and Dallas Independent School District. At the time, the city did not have the 8,000 children required under Texas law as a requirement for forming a new district, so KTVT stated, "Even if the proposal had passed, there would have been little, if anything, the city could have done to move forward." About 66% of voters decided against the referendum.

In 2006, O'Hare introduced numerous ordinances targeting the city's growing undocumented immigrant and Latino community, including: requiring proof of citizenship to rent, establish English as the city's official language, and to enable local police to check immigration status as well as enforce immigration law. By 2012, the city had engaged in a protracted legal fight in courts defending the constitutionality of the ordinances, spending over $5 million on legal fees and retained Kris Kobach as counsel. Writing for International Migration, Brettell and Nibbs contextualized O'Hare's ordinances as part of a growing "Latino threat narrative" stating that he had scapegoated the city's lagging home appreciation on undocumented, largely Latino immigrants. In 2014, the U.S. Supreme Court declined to review a lower-court ruling that declared the ordinance unconstitutional.

=== Tarrant County Judge ===
In 2022, O'Hare ran for County Judge of Tarrant County. He defeated former Fort Worth mayor Betsy Price, who was supported by incumbent judge B. Glen Whitley and Mattie Parker, in the Republican primary with the support of Donald Trump. He was elected in the general election, defeating Democratic nominee Deborah Peoples with 53% of the vote. Writing for the Fort Worth Star-Telegram, Abby Church said "O’Hare’s induction onto the commissioners court marks a transition in Tarrant County politics. The county has largely been governed by middle-right leadership from Whitley, a Republican, and Tom Vandergriff, who was county judge for 16 years before Whitley. With O’Hare, the county takes a sharper turn to the right."

In 2024, O'Hare was a speculated candidate for retiring U.S. Representative Kay Granger's 12th district seat, but opted to remain in his position.

In May 2025, when there were two Democrats and two Republicans on the Tarrant County Commissioners Court, O'Hare declared that the ongoing process of redistricting Tarrant County precincts was "purely 100% about partisan politics", as he detailed that "my plan and what I campaigned on openly and publicly, dating as far back as May 2021", is to "pass a map that guarantees, or comes as close as you can to guarantee, three Republican commissioners" in Tarrant County out of four, as O'Hare thought that "Tarrant County would be better served if we have strong Republican leadership".

In O'Hare's three years as County Judge, the Tarrant County Commissioners Court added a property homestead exemption and passed property tax rates for Tarrant County and the Tarrant County Hospital District below each entity's No-New-Revenue Rate. The Tarrant County Operating Budget has decreased by $81 million over those three years as well.

== Personal life ==
O'Hare and his wife, Christen, met and got married in 2008. They have four daughters and live in Southlake, Texas.
