= Tony Tinderholt =

Texas businessman, educator and legislator

Member of the Texas House of Representatives from the 94th district
- Incumbent
- Assumed office January 13, 2015
- Preceded by: Diane Patrick

Personal details
- Born: August 31, 1970 (age 56) Chippewa County, Minnesota, U.S.
- Party: Republican
- Spouses: Kimberly Greaves (m. 1990; div. 1994) (m. 1995; div. 1996) Tammy J. Land (m. 1996; div. 1997) Tamara Dawn Levan (m. 2002; div. 2007) Bethany Tyler (m. 2009)
- Children: 3
- Occupation: Businessman
- Website: Campaign website

Military service
- Branch/service: United States Air Force; United States Army
- Years of service: (1991–1997)(Air Force) (2003–2005)(Army)
- Battles/wars: Iraq War

Tony Dale Tinderholt (born August 13, 1970) is an American politician who is Republican member of the Texas House of Representatives from Arlington, Texas currently representing District 94. On January 13, 2015, Tinderholt succeeded Diane Patrick, a four-term representative whom he unseated in the Republican primary election on March 4, 2014. During Sine Die, the final day of the 89th legislative session on June 2, 2025, Tinderholt announced that he would not be running for reelection, instead seeking office in the Tarrant County Commissioners Court.

== Political career ==
=== Elections ===
Tinderholt won the 2014 Republican nomination over four-term incumbent Diane Patrick, 7,489 votes (55.44 percent) to 6,018 (44.55 percent). Tinderholt was endorsed in his primary challenge by the right-wing group Empower Texans, which targeted Patrick for comparatively moderate positions. Texas Observer described Tinderholt as possibly the most far-right political candidate in Texas in that year.

In the November 2014 general election, Tinderholt, with 23,034 votes (56.64 percent), defeated Democrat Cole Ballweg and Libertarian Robert Harris, who received 16,461 (40.47 percent) and 1,172 (2.88 percent), respectively.

In the general election held on November 6, 2018, Tinderholt won his third legislative term. With 32,448 votes (52.49 percent), he defeated Democrat Finnigan Jones, who received 27,145 votes (43.91 percent). Another 2,230 votes (3.61 percent) went to Libertarian candidate Jessica Pallett.

=== Tenure ===
In 2015, Tinderholt filed a handwritten complaint with the Texas Commission on Judicial Conduct, criticizing judicial rulings regarding same-sex marriage. The complaint was riddled with errors, naming the wrong judge (Tinderholt named Judge David Wahlberg, rather than against Judge Guy Herman, the judge who had made the ruling about which Tinderholt complained) and incorrectly asserting that the judge "deliberately violated" a state law requiring a notification to the state attorney general's office prior to striking down a law as unconstitutional (Judge Herman did in fact make the notification to the state attorney general).

In January 2017, Tinderholt introduced House Bill 948, the "Abolition of Abortion in Texas Act." The bill seeks to criminalize abortions that take place after the "moment of fertilization." The abortion ban would make it legal to charge both the woman and her doctor with murder. In an interview with the Texas Observer, Tinderholt explained why he introduced the bill:

"I don't think that there should be any exceptions to murder, no matter what. So, if this child was out of the womb and it was a child that was born out of rape or incest, no one would be OK with killing a child. I look at it like that child is a child in the womb, just like it's out. [...] Right now, it's real easy. Right now, they don't make it important to be personally responsible because they know that they have a backup of 'oh, I can just go get an abortion.' Now, we both know that consenting adults don't always think smartly sometimes. But consenting adults need to also consider the repercussions of the sexual relationship that they're gonna have, which is a child."

The bill would also criminalize abortions resulting from rape and incest.

On March 21, 2017, Tinderholt criticized then Representative Byron Cook of Corsicana for Cook's refusal to hold a hearing before the House State Affairs Committee on Tinderholt's proposed ban on abortion in Texas. Cook said that the office of Attorney General Ken Paxton has called the measure "unconstitutional" and therefore no hearing will be set. Tinderholt accused Cook of "hiding behind the office of attorney general" so as to block a vote on the legislation.

In 2017, Tinderholt supported a "bathroom bill" proposed by two fellow Republican state lawmakers, Representative Ron Simmons and Senator Lois Kolkhorst; the legislation would have nullified anti-discrimination ordinances adopted by Texas cities and counties protecting transgender Texans' access to public restrooms that matched their gender identity.

Tinderholt supports a ban on Democrats being given committee chairmanships as long as the Republicans hold the majority of seats in the Texas House.

An analysis of votes from the 2023 regular session of the Texas Legislature, conducted by Rice University's James A. Baker III Institute for Public Policy, ranked Patterson as the sixth-most conservative member of the state House, based on votes cast.

In May 2023, Tinderholt voted against the impeachment of Texas Attorney General Ken Paxton.

In 2025, Tinderholt sponsored a bill to ban gender affirming care for transgender individuals of all ages.

== Personal life ==
Tinderholt has been married five times. His current wife, Bethany Tyler, is a former Dallas Cowboys cheerleader. He married Kimberly Greaves in 1990; they divorced in 1994, re-married in 1995, and divorced again in 1996. Other marriages lasted from 1996 to 1997, and 2002 to 2007.

Tinderholt has two children from a previous marriage and a daughter with Bethany Tyler.

Tinderholt has a titanium aortic valve replacement. In 2020, he was hospitalized with COVID-19.

Texas House of Representatives
Preceded by Diane Patrick	Member of the Texas House of Representatives from the 94th district 2015–present	Incumbent
