= Daniel Rodimer =

American professional wrestler (born 1978)

Dan Rodimer
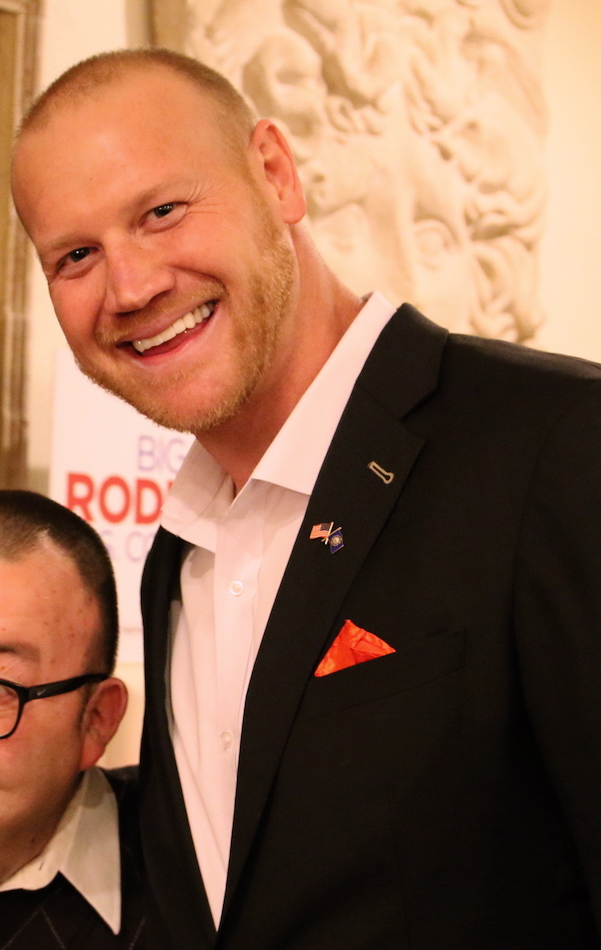
- Rodimer in 2019

Personal details
- Born: Daniel Stephen Rodimer; May 22, 1978 (age 48) Denville Township, New Jersey, U.S.
- Party: Republican
- Spouse: Sarah Rodimer
- Children: 6
- Education: University of South Florida (BA); Ave Maria School of Law (JD)
- Professional wrestling career
- Ring name(s): Dan Rodimer; Dan Rodman; Daniel Rodimer
- Billed height: 6 ft 7 in (201 cm)
- Billed weight: 300 lb (136 kg)
- Billed from: Clearwater, Florida
- Trained by: Deep South Wrestling
- Debut: 2004
- Retired: 2007

Daniel Stephen Rodimer (born May 22, 1978), also known by his ring name Dan Rodman, is an American retired professional wrestler, former football player, and former political candidate. In 2006, he signed a one-year developmental contract with WWE.

Rodimer won the Republican primary for Nevada's 3rd congressional district in 2020. He lost narrowly to Democratic incumbent Susie Lee in the November 2020 general election. He has garnered endorsements from President Donald Trump, Ted Cruz, the National Rifle Association (NRA), and the National Right to Life Committee (NRLC). Just minutes before the March 5, 2021, filing deadline, he announced his candidacy for Texas's 6th congressional district special election.

On March 6, 2024, an arrest warrant was issued for Rodimer in Las Vegas on a charge of open murder. Rodimer surrendered to police the following day.

== Early life and education ==
Rodimer grew up in Rockaway, New Jersey, and attended Seton Hall Preparatory High School in West Orange. He attended the University of South Florida and played college football for the South Florida Bulls. He was a member of Lambda Chi Alpha fraternity. Rodimer attended the Ave Maria School of Law in Vineyards, Florida, where he graduated in 2013.

== Career ==
Rodimer played semi-pro football for the Tampa Bay Barracudas and in the Arena Football League. He also worked as a personal trainer.

=== World Wrestling Entertainment (2006–2007) ===
Rodimer got into wrestling by becoming a contestant in the 2004 Tough Enough competition.

On July 12, 2006, Rodimer was signed to a developmental contract with World Wrestling Entertainment and was assigned to Deep South Wrestling. His first match came on September 7, when he defeated Heath Miller. On September 24, he had his first televised match in DSW as Dan Rodimer, defeating Tommy Suede.

Rodimer spent the first half of 2007 wrestling primarily in Ohio Valley Wrestling, WWE's other developmental territory. He feuded with Atlas DaBone throughout February and March.

Rodimer made his debut on Heat, beating Eugene. He then returned to OVW. Daniel appeared on Heat twice more that year. Rodimer was then transferred to the new Florida Championship Wrestling territory. However, he was released from his contract on August 22, 2007.

== Campaigns for public office ==
In 2018, Rodimer ran for Nevada State Senate. He lost to Valerie Weber in the primary election by 142 votes, despite outspending her nearly two-to-one.

In 2019, Rodimer announced his bid for Nevada's 3rd congressional district. He narrowly lost to incumbent Susie Lee in the general election.

In March 2021, Rodimer announced his candidacy for Texas's 6th congressional district special election. He was noted for dramatically changing his accent and persona in his campaign ad compared to his run in Nevada the previous year. He placed eleventh in the crowded jungle primary, attaining 2.6 percent of the vote share.

During his campaign, Rodimer cast doubt on the integrity of the 2020 presidential election, saying "I think that we had some serious issues with this election and we've got to make sure that doesn't happen again," in response to whether he believed the election was "stolen". Rodimer also said of the storming of the Capitol by a mob of Trump supporters, "On January 6, people come to me all the time, they say, 'Big Dan Rodimer, what would you have done differently?' Well, you know what? I wouldn't have been hiding under my desk like all the other folks. I would have been out there, walking to the very, very front, top of the stairs saying, 'hey, the fact is we are all Americans. We want fair and free elections."

== Personal life ==
Rodimer and his wife Sarah reside in Mansfield, Texas, where he moved with his family in 2021. Prior to this, the family lived in Las Vegas, where Rodimer was a member of the Clark County School District Safety Advisory Committee in 2018. They have six children.

== Legal issues ==
=== Assault accusations ===
Rodimer has been accused three times of assault but has no convictions. After an arrest on charges of battery in 2010, Rodimer entered a deferred prosecution agreement. In that agreement he admitted to committing the offense, and upon completion of a six-week anger management training course the charge was dropped. He was also accused of assault in 2011 and 2013, according to records from the Collier County (Florida) Sheriff's Office; however, in both cases no charges were filed.

=== Murder allegation ===
On March 6, 2024, an arrest warrant was issued for Rodimer on an open murder charge in Las Vegas in connection with the death of Chris Tapp in Las Vegas the previous October. Tapp was himself convicted of murder but later exonerated after serving two decades in prison. Rodimer surrendered to police the following day. Rodimer has pleaded not guilty to the charge. Rodimer's motion to dismiss the murder charge was denied by a Nevada appeals court in April 2025. In November 2025, Rodimer's murder trial was scheduled for June 2026.
