= Texas's 94th House of Representatives district =

Electoral district of Texas

Texas's 94th State House of Representatives district
Representative
| Tony Tinderholt; R–Arlington |

District 94 is a district in the Texas House of Representatives. It has been represented by Republican Tony Tinderholt since 2015.

== Geography ==
The district contains parts of the Tarrant County.

== Members ==
- Diane Patrick (2007–2015)
- Tony Tinderholt (since 2015)
