= Lydia Bean =

American academic and politician

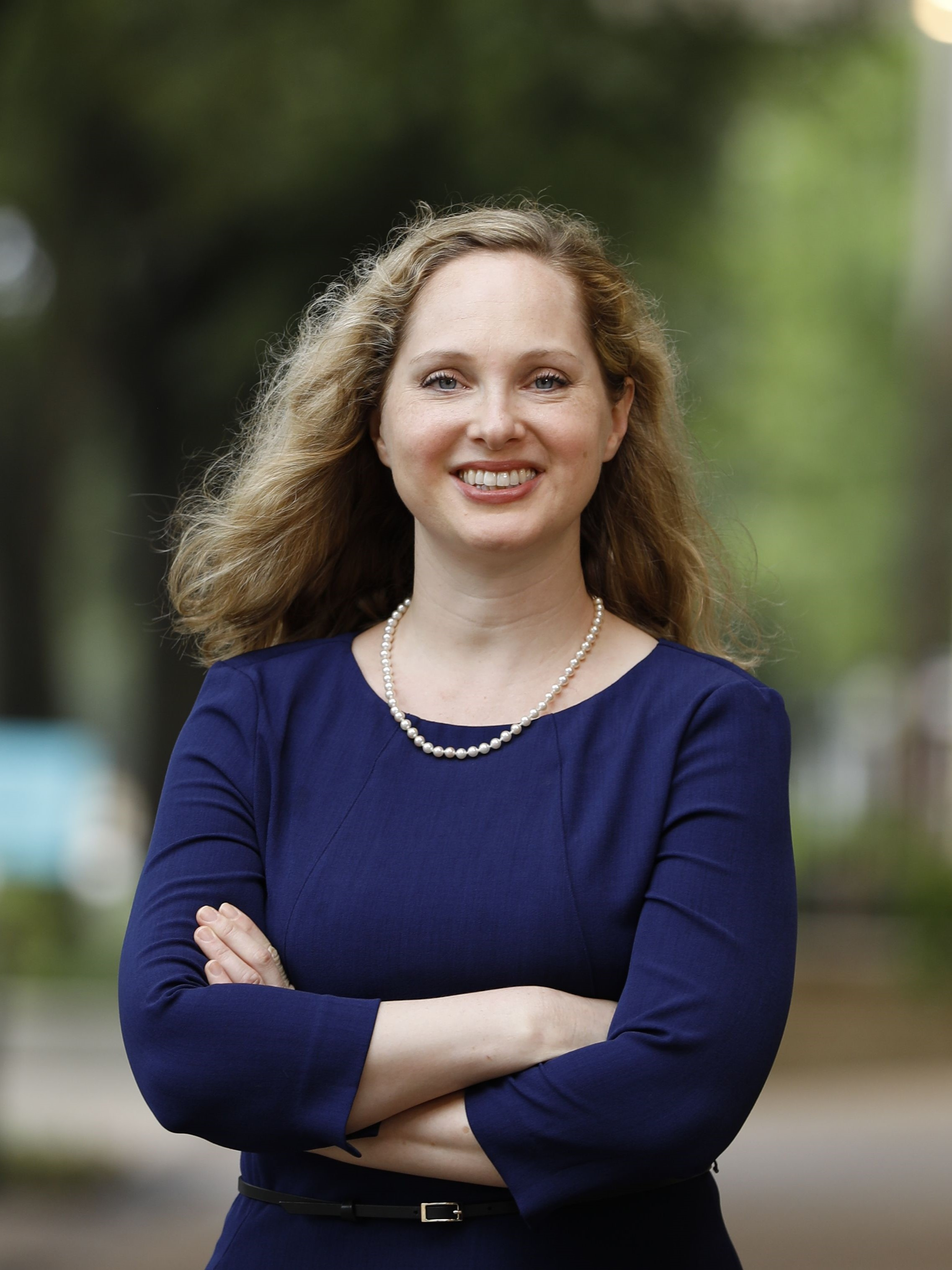
- Occupation: Management Consultant

Academic background
- Education: Austin College (BA); Harvard University (MA, PhD)
- Doctoral advisor: Robert J. Sampson

Academic work
- Discipline: Sociology
- Institutions: Baylor University; University of Texas at Arlington
- Notable works: The Politics of Evangelical Identity
- Website: Official website

Lydia N. Bean is an American social scientist and management consultant. She owns Equipa, a consulting firm that works with nonprofits, foundations, and social enterprises. She authored an ethnographic book, The Politics of Evangelical Identity (2014), about Evangelical communities on the Canada–United States border. Bean is a fellow at New America and a faculty research associate at the University of Texas at Arlington. She was an assistant professor of sociology at Baylor University.

Bean is the Democratic nominee for Tarrant County clerk in the 2026 election. She was previously a Democratic candidate for the Texas House of Representatives in 2020 and ran in the 2021 special election for Texas's 6th congressional district.

== Local Leadership ==
Bean has advocated for fiscal responsibility in the Tarrant County Commissioner’s Court. In 2023, she advised the Commissioner’s Court that they were misusing federal funds by redirecting money budgeted for healthcare, housing and childcare toward a private prison contract. She has written about the importance of local democracy and advocated for local, state, and federal governments to work together. In addition, she led a committee at Broadway Baptist Church dealing with justice issues, such as the unusually high number of deaths in the Tarrant County Jail.

== Education ==
Bean completed a bachelor's degree in Spanish and music at Austin College in 2002. She earned a Ph.D. in sociology from Harvard University in June 2009. Bean's dissertation on the politics of evangelical identity in the United States and Canada became the basis of her 2014 book, The Politics of Evangelical Identity. The book incorporates ethnographic research from her time in Evangelical communities on both sides of the Canada–United States border. Her doctoral advisor was social scientist Robert J. Sampson.

== Career ==
Bean was an assistant professor of sociology at Baylor University. She later became a fellow at New America and a faculty research associate at the University of Texas at Arlington. She owns Equipa, a management consulting firm.

=== 2020 Texas House of Representatives election ===
Bean was a Democratic candidate campaigning against incumbent Republican Matt Krause for District 93 in the 2020 Texas House of Representatives election. Priorities of her campaign included Medicaid expansion and fully funding public schools. Bean has been endorsed by pro-LGBT rights group Equality Texas. She has also been endorsed by the advocacy group, the National Democratic Redistricting Committee.

A coalition that includes the National Democratic Redistricting Committee, the Texas House Democratic Campaign Committee, the Future Now Fund, The People PAC, and The Creative Resistance included Bean, along with 10 other Democratic candidates, in a $1.1 million digital advertising campaign. Two years prior, Bean's mother ran for the statehouse seat, spending $30,000 and receiving 46 percent of the vote.

=== 2021 U.S. House special election ===
Bean was a Democratic candidate in the 2021 Texas's 6th congressional district special election. In the first round of voting, Bean finished in eighth place out of 23 candidates.

== Personal ==
Bean is married to public artist Norman Lee, and they have two children. In 2018, Bean was awarded the Woodrow B. Seals Laity Award by Perkins School of Theology in recognition of her interfaith work bringing people together for change across the lines of race and religion. She is a member of Broadway Baptist Church in Fort Worth, Texas.
