= 2021 United States state legislative elections =

- November 2, 2021

3 legislative chambers 2 states
	Majority party	Minority party	Third party
Party	Republican	Democratic	Coalition
Chambers before	61	37	1 (Note: The Alaska House of Representatives is controlled by a coalition of Democrats, Republicans, and independents. The minority caucus consists of Republicans who are not part of the majority coalition.)
Chambers after	62	36	1
Overall change	▲1	▼1	Steady
- Map of upper house elections: Democrats retained control Special elections held

- Map of lower house elections: Democrats retained control Republicans gained control Special elections held

The 2021 United States state legislative elections were held on November 2, 2021. Three legislative chambers in two states, New Jersey and Virginia, held regularly scheduled elections. These off-year elections coincided with other state and local elections, including gubernatorial elections in both states.

As a result of the elections, New Jersey retained its Democratic trifecta, while a divided government was established in Virginia, as Republicans won back the lower house of the Virginia legislature, which they lost two years earlier.

== Summary table ==
Regularly scheduled elections were held in 3 of the 99 state legislative chambers in the United States. Nationwide, regularly scheduled elections were held for 220 of the 7,383 legislative seats. This table only covers regularly scheduled elections; additional special elections took place concurrently with these regularly scheduled elections.

State	Upper House				Lower House			
State	Seats up	Total	% up	Term	Seats up	Total	% up	Term
New Jersey	40	40	100	2	80	80	100	2
Virginia	0	40	0	4	100	100	100	2

== Electoral predictions ==
Most election predictors use:

- "Tossup": No advantage
- "Tilt": Advantage that is not quite as strong as "lean"
- "Lean": Slight advantage
- "Likely": Significant, but surmountable, advantage
- "Safe" or "Solid": Near-certain chance of victory

State	PVI	Chamber	Last election	Sabato Oct. 18, 2021	Elections Daily Nov. 1, 2021	Result
New Jersey	D+6	Senate	D 25–15	Safe D	Safe D	D 24–16
New Jersey	D+6	General Assembly	D 52–28	Safe D	Safe D	D 46–34
Virginia	D+2	House of Delegates	D 55–45	Tilt D	Tossup	R 52–48

== State summaries ==
=== New Jersey ===
Senate results

General Assembly results

All seats of the New Jersey Senate and the New Jersey General Assembly were up for election. One Senator and two Assembly members were elected to two-year terms in each district. Democrats retained majority control in both chambers, but they lost seats in each as well, despite their candidates generally outrunning governor Phil Murphy in the concurrent gubernatorial election. Most stunningly, Senate president Stephen Sweeney lost re-election to a political newcomer who spent less than $2,500 on his campaign.

Senate
Party	Leader	Before	After	Change
Democratic	Stephen Sweeney (defeated)	25	24	▼1
Republican	Thomas Kean Jr. (retired)	15	16	▲1
Total		40	40	

General Assembly
Party	Leader	Before	After	Change
Democratic	Craig Coughlin	52	46	▼6
Republican	Jon Bramnick (retired)	28	34	▲6
Total		80	80	

=== Virginia ===
House of Delegates results

All seats of the Virginia House of Delegates are up for election; the Virginia Senate did not hold regularly-scheduled elections in 2021. Delegates are elected to two-year terms in single-member districts. Democrats had recently gained control of the House in 2019; however, they lost their majority to the Republicans in this election.

House of Delegates
Party	Leader	Before	After	Change
Republican	Todd Gilbert	45	52	▲7
Democratic	Eileen Filler-Corn	55	48	▼7
Total		100	100	

== Special elections ==
Various states held special elections for legislative districts throughout the year. Neither party made net gains, with Democrats picking up 3 seats in the Massachusetts House of Representatives, New Hampshire House of Representatives, and Maine House of Representatives, while Republicans picked up 3 seats in the Connecticut State Senate, Iowa House of Representatives, and Texas House of Representatives.

=== Alabama ===
District		Incumbent			This race	
Chamber	No.	Representative	Party	First elected	Results	Candidates
House	33	Ronald Johnson	Republican	1978	Incumbent died July 14, 2020, of liver cancer. New member elected January 19, 2021. Republican hold.	▌ ✓ Ben Robbins (Republican) 68.2%; ▌ Fred Crum (Democratic) 31.7%
Senate	26	David Burkette	Democratic	2018 (special)	Incumbent resigned September 1, 2020, for private reasons. New member elected March 2, 2021. Democratic hold.	▌ ✓ Kirk Hatcher (Democratic) 78.3%; ▌ William Green (Republican) 21.5%
Senate	14	Cam Ward	Republican	2010	Incumbent resigned December 7, 2020, to become the Director of the Alabama Board of Pardons and Paroles. New member elected July 13, 2021. Republican hold.	▌ ✓ April Weaver (Republican) 89.6%; ▌ Virginia Applebaum (Democratic) 10.4%
House	73	Matt Fridy	Republican	2014	Incumbent resigned January 18, 2021, to join the Alabama Court of Civil Appeals. New member elected July 13, 2021. Republican hold.	▌ ✓ Kenneth Paschal (Republican) 74.9%; ▌ Sheridan Black (Democratic) 25.1%
House	78	Kirk Hatcher	Democratic	2018	Incumbent resigned March 3, 2021, to join the Alabama Senate. New member elected September 7, 2021. Democratic hold.	▌ ✓ Kenyatté Hassell (Democratic) 80.1%; ▌ Loretta G. Grant (Republican) 19.8%

=== California ===
District		Incumbent			This race	
Chamber	No.	Representative	Party	First elected	Results	Candidates
Senate	30	Holly Mitchell	Democratic	2013 (special)	Incumbent resigned December 6, 2020, to join the Los Angeles County Board of Supervisors. New member elected March 2, 2021. Democratic hold.	▌ ✓ Sydney Kamlager (Democratic) 68.7%; ▌ Daniel Lee (Democratic) 13.4%; ▌ Joe Lisuzzo (Republican) 6.3%; ▌ Cheryl C. Turner (Democratic) 5.4%; ▌ Tiffani Jones (Republican) 2.3%; ▌ Ernesto Huerta (Peace and Freedom) 2.2%; ▌ Renita Duncan (Independent) 1.8%
Assembly	79	Shirley Weber	Democratic	2012	Incumbent resigned January 29, 2021, to become Secretary of State of California. New member elected April 6, 2021. Democratic hold.	▌ ✓ Akilah Weber (Democratic) 52.0%; ▌ Marco Contreras (Republican) 33.4%; ▌ Leticia Munguia (Democratic) 8.2%; ▌ Shane Suzanne Parmely (Democratic) 5.1%; ▌ Aeiramique Glass Blake (Democratic) 1.3%
Assembly	54	Sydney Kamlager	Democratic	2018 (special)	Incumbent resigned March 11, 2021, to join the State Senate. New member elected May 18, 2021. Democratic hold.	▌ ✓ Isaac Bryan (Democratic) 50.8%; ▌ Heather Hutt (Democratic) 24.9%; ▌ Cheryl C. Turner (Democratic) 9.6%; ▌ Dallas Fowler (Democratic) 7.7%; ▌ Bernard Senter (No party preference) 4.0%; ▌ Samuel Robert Morales (Democratic) 3.1%
Assembly	18	Rob Bonta	Democratic	2012	Incumbent resigned April 22, 2021, to become Attorney General of California. General election held June 29. New member elected in runoff August 31, 2021. Democratic hold.	▌ ✓ Mia Bonta (Democratic) 56.8%; ▌ Janani Ramachandran (Democratic) 43.2%

=== Connecticut ===
District		Incumbent			This race	
Chamber	No.	Representative	Party	First elected	Results	Candidates
Senate	27	Carlo Leone	Democratic	2011 (special)	Incumbent resigned January 5, 2021, to become Senior ConnDOT advisor. New member elected March 2, 2021. Democratic hold.	▌ ✓ Patricia Miller (Democratic) 59.5%; ▌ Joshua Esses (Republican) 39.4%; ▌ Brian Merlen (Independent) 1.1%
House	112	J.P. Sredzinski	Republican	2014	Incumbent resigned February 17, 2021, for private reasons. New member elected April 13, 2021. Republican hold.	▌ ✓ Tony Scott (Republican) 53.2%; ▌ Nicholas Kapoor (Democratic) 46.1%; ▌ William Furrier (Independent) 0.7%
House	145	Patricia Miller	Democratic	2008	Incumbent resigned March 8, 2021, to join the State Senate. New member elected April 27, 2021. Democratic hold.	▌ ✓ Corey Paris (Democratic) 76.4%; ▌ J. D. Ospina (Republican) 23.6%
Senate	36	Alexandra Kasser	Democratic	2018	Incumbent resigned June 22, 2021, due to divorce proceedings. New member elected August 17, 2021. Republican gain.	▌ ✓ Ryan Fazio (Republican) 50.1%; ▌ Alexis Gevanter (Democratic) 47.6%; ▌ John Blankey (Independent) 2.3%
House	116	Michael DiMassa	Democratic	2016	Incumbent resigned October 25, 2021, after being arrested for wire fraud. New member elected December 14, 2021. Democratic hold.	▌ ✓ Treneé McGee (Democratic) 52.6%; ▌ Richard DePalma (Republican) 43.3%; ▌ Portia Bias (Independent) 4.1%

=== Georgia ===
District		Incumbent			This race	
Chamber	No.	Representative	Party	First elected	Results	Candidates
House	90	Pam Stephenson	Democratic	2004	Incumbent resigned September 10, 2020, due to dementia. New member elected March 9, 2021. Democratic hold.	▌ ✓ Angela Moore (Democratic) 59.0%; ▌ Stan Watson (Democratic) 41.0%
House	34	Bert Reeves	Republican	2014	Incumbent resigned April 30, 2021, to become vice-president of university relations at Georgia Institute of Technology. General election held June 15. New member elected in runoff July 13, 2021. Republican hold.	▌ ✓ Devan Seabaugh (Republican) 63.0%; ▌ Priscilla Smith (Democratic) 37.0%
House	156	Greg Morris	Republican	1998	Incumbent resigned April 13, 2021, to join the Georgia Department of Transportation. General election held June 15. New member elected in runoff July 13, 2021. Republican hold.	▌ ✓ Leesa Hagan (Republican) 51.7%; ▌ Wally Sapp (Republican) 48.3%
House	165	Mickey Stephens	Democratic	2008	Incumbent died August 14, 2021, of illness. New member elected November 2, 2021. Democratic hold.	▌ ✓ Edna Jackson (Democratic) 53.2%; ▌ Antwan Lang (Democratic) 18.7%; ▌ Clinton Cowart (Libertarian) 15.6%; ▌ Clinton Young (Democratic) 8.6%; ▌ Sabrina Kent (Democratic) 3.9%

=== Iowa ===
District		Incumbent			This race	
Chamber	No.	Representative	Party	First elected	Results	Candidates
Senate	41	Mariannette Miller-Meeks	Republican	2018	Incumbent resigned January 2, 2021, to become a U.S. Representative. New member elected January 26, 2021. Republican hold.	▌ ✓ Adrian Dickey (Republican) 55.3%; ▌ Mary Stewart (Democratic) 44.7%
House	37	John Landon	Republican	2012	Incumbent died July 29, 2021, of cancer. New member elected September 14, 2021. Republican hold.	▌ ✓ Mike Bousselot (Republican) 51.6%; ▌ Andrea Phillips (Democratic) 48.3%
House	29	Wes Breckenridge	Democratic	2016	Incumbent resigned September 10, 2021, to take a job with the Iowa Law Enforcement Academy. New member elected October 12, 2021. Republican gain.	▌ ✓ Jon Dunwell (Republican) 59.8%; ▌ Steve Mullan (Democratic) 40.1%
Senate	1	Zach Whiting	Republican	2018	Incumbent resigned October 30, 2021, to take a job with the Texas Public Policy Foundation. New member elected December 14, 2021. Republican hold.	▌ ✓ Dave Rowley (Republican) 75.7%; ▌ Mark Lemke (Democratic) 24.3%

=== Kentucky ===
District		Incumbent			This race	
Chamber	No.	Representative	Party	First elected	Results	Candidates
Senate	22	Tom Buford	Republican	1990	Incumbent died July 6, 2021, of cancer. New member elected November 2, 2021. Republican hold.	▌ ✓ Donald Douglas (Republican) 74.8%; ▌ Helen Bukulmez (Democratic) 24.9%; ▌ Sindicat "Sid" Dunn (Independent) 0.3%
House	51	John "Bam" Carney	Republican	2008	Incumbent died July 17, 2021, of pancreatitis. New member elected November 2, 2021. Republican hold.	▌ ✓ Michael Pollock (Republican) 80.0%; ▌ Edwin Rogers (Democratic) 16.9%; ▌ Timothy Shafer (Independent) 3.1%
House	89	Robert Goforth	Republican	2018 (special)	Incumbent resigned August 24, 2021, due to domestic assault proceedings. New member elected November 2, 2021. Republican hold.	▌ ✓ Timmy Truett (Republican) 94.0%; ▌ Maetinee Suramek (Democratic) 6.0%

=== Louisiana ===
District		Incumbent			This race	
Chamber	No.	Representative	Party	First elected	Results	Candidates
House	82	Charles Henry	Republican	2019	Incumbent resigned January 12, 2021, for private reasons. New member elected April 24, 2021. Republican hold.	▌ ✓ Laurie Schlegel (Republican) 51.9%; ▌ Edwin Connick (Republican) 48.1%
Senate	7	Troy Carter	Democratic	2015	Incumbent resigned May 10, 2021, to become a U.S. Representative. New member elected June 12, 2021. Democratic hold.	▌ ✓ Gary Carter Jr. (Democratic) 60.2%; ▌ Patricia "Patty" McCarty (Republican) 17.2%; ▌ Joanna Cappiello-Leopold (Democratic) 13.8%; ▌ Mack Cormier (Democratic) 8.8%
House	102	Gary Carter Jr.	Democratic	2015	Incumbent resigned July 2, 2021, to join the State Senate. New member elected November 13, 2021. Democratic hold.	▌ ✓ Delisha Boyd (Democratic) 61.7%; ▌ Jordan Bridges (Democratic) 38.3%
House	16	Frederick D. Jones	Democratic	2019	Incumbent resigned July 16, 2021, to become a Fourth Judicial District Court judge. New member elected November 13, 2021. Democratic hold.	▌ ✓ Adrian Fisher (Democratic) 69.3%; ▌ Alicia Calvin (Democratic) 19.8%; ▌ Charles Bradford (Democratic) 10.9%
Senate	27	Ronnie Johns	Republican	2011	Incumbent resigned July 23, 2021, to become chairman of the Louisiana State Gaming Control Board. New member elected November 13, 2021. Republican hold.	▌ ✓ Jeremy Stine (Republican) 59.2%; ▌ Dustin Granger (Democratic) 38.6%; ▌ Jake Shaheen (Republican) 2.3%

=== Maine ===
District		Incumbent			This race	
Chamber	No.	Representative	Party	First elected	Results	Candidates
Senate	14	Shenna Bellows	Democratic	2016	Incumbent resigned December 2, 2020, to become Secretary of State of Maine. New member elected March 9, 2021. Democratic hold.	▌ ✓ Craig Hickman (Democratic) 62.6%; ▌ William Guerrette (Republican) 37.4%
House	86	Justin Fecteau	Republican	2018	Incumbent resigned July 4, 2021, to take a teaching job outside his district. New member elected November 2, 2021. Democratic gain.	▌ ✓ Raegan LaRochelle (Democratic) 56.2%; ▌ James Orr (Republican) 43.8%

=== Massachusetts ===
District		Incumbent			This race	
Chamber	No.	Representative	Party	First elected	Results	Candidates
House	Suffolk 19	Robert DeLeo	Democratic	1990	Incumbent resigned December 29, 2020, to work at Northeastern University. New member elected March 30, 2021. Democratic hold.	▌ ✓ Jeffrey Turco (Democratic) 66.5%; ▌ Richard Fucillo (Independent) 16.9%; ▌ Paul Caruccio (Republican) 16.6%
House	Essex 4	Bradford Hill	Republican	1998	Incumbent resigned September 15, 2021, to become a commissioner with the Massachusetts Gaming Commission. New member elected November 30, 2021. Democratic gain.	▌ ✓ Jamie Belsito (Democratic) 55.4%; ▌ Robert Snow (Republican) 44.6%

=== Michigan ===
District		Incumbent			This race	
Chamber	No.	Representative	Party	First elected	Results	Candidates
Senate	8	Peter Lucido	Republican	2018	Incumbent resigned December 31, 2020, to become Macomb County Prosecutor. New member elected November 2, 2021. Republican hold.	▌ ✓ Douglas Wozniak (Republican) 61.9%; ▌ Martin Genter (Democratic) 38.1%
Senate	28	Peter MacGregor	Republican	2014	Incumbent resigned December 31, 2020, to become Kent County Treasurer. New member elected November 2, 2021. Republican hold.	▌ ✓ Mark Huizenga (Republican) 60.6%; ▌ Keith Courtade (Democratic) 37.0%; ▌ Alexander Avery (Libertarian) 1.4%; ▌ Theodore Gerrard (Constitution) 1.0%

=== Mississippi ===
District		Incumbent			This race	
Chamber	No.	Representative	Party	First elected	Results	Candidates
Senate	32	Sampson Jackson	Democratic	1991	Incumbent resigned June 30, 2021, for private reasons. General election held November 2, 2021; New member elected in runoff November 23. Democratic hold.	▌ ✓ Rod Hickman (Democratic) 59.8%; Minh Duong 40.2%
Senate	38	Tammy Witherspoon	Democratic	2015	Incumbent resigned June 30, 2021, to become mayor of Magnolia. New member elected November 2, 2021. Democratic hold.	▌ ✓ Kelvin Butler (Democratic) 52.3%; ▌ Gary Brumfield (Democratic) 47.7%
House	29	Abe Marshall Hudson Jr.	Democratic	2016 (special)	Incumbent resigned August 30, 2021, for private reasons. New member elected outright after the November 2, 2021, general election was cancelled. Democratic hold.	▌ ✓ Robert L. Sanders (Democratic)

=== Missouri ===
District		Incumbent			This race	
Chamber	No.	Representative	Party	First elected	Results	Candidates
House	45	Kip Kendrick	Democratic	2014	Incumbent resigned January 6, 2021, to become Senator Greg Razer's chief of staff. New member elected April 6, 2021. Democratic hold.	▌ ✓ David Tyson Smith (Democratic) 75.2%; ▌ Glenn Nielsen (Libertarian) 24.8%

=== New Hampshire ===
District		Incumbent			This race	
Chamber	No.	Representative	Party	First elected	Results	Candidates
House	Hillsborough 21	Dick Hinch	Republican	2008	Incumbent died December 9, 2020, of COVID-19. New member elected April 13, 2021. Republican hold.	▌ ✓ William Boyd III (Republican) 53.0%; ▌ Wendy E.N. Thomas (Democratic) 44.9%; ▌ Stephen Hollenberg (Independent) 2.2%
House	Merrimack 23	Samantha Fox	Democratic	2018	Incumbent resigned January 12, 2021, to take a job outside her district. New member elected June 8, 2021. Democratic hold.	▌ ✓ Muriel Hall (Democratic) 57.9%; ▌ Christopher Lins (Republican) 42.1%
House	Hillsborough 7	David Danielson	Republican	2012	Incumbent died May 22, 2021, of cancer. New member elected September 7, 2021. Democratic gain.	▌ ✓ Catherine Rombeau (Democratic) 50.4%; ▌ Linda Camarota (Republican) 49.6%
House	Cheshire 9	Douglas Ley	Democratic	2012	Incumbent died June 10, 2021, of cancer. New member elected October 26, 2021. Democratic hold.	▌ ✓ Andrew Maneval (Democratic) 64.9%; ▌ Rita Mattson (Republican) 35.1%
House	Rockingham 6	Anne Copp	Republican	2020	Incumbent resigned August 5, 2021, after moving out of her district. New member elected December 7, 2021. Republican hold.	▌ ✓ Jodi Nelson (Republican) 58.8%; ▌ Mary Eisner (Democratic) 41.2%

=== New York ===
District		Incumbent			This race	
Chamber	No.	Representative	Party	First elected	Results	Candidates
Senate	30	Brian Benjamin	Democratic	2017 (special)	Incumbent resigned September 7, 2021, to become Lieutenant Governor of New York. New member elected November 2, 2021. Democratic hold.	▌ ✓ Cordell Cleare (Democratic) 88.4%; ▌ Oz Sultan (Republican) 6.0%; ▌ Shana Harmongoff (Democratic/Other) 5.4%
Assembly	86	Victor M. Pichardo	Democratic	2013 (special)	Incumbent resigned September 10, 2021, for private reasons. New member elected November 2, 2021. Democratic hold.	▌ ✓ Yudelka Tapia (Democratic)

=== Oklahoma ===
District		Incumbent			This race	
Chamber	No.	Representative	Party	First elected	Results	Candidates
Senate	22	Stephanie Bice	Republican	2014	Incumbent resigned December 31, 2020, to become a U.S. Representative. New member elected April 6, 2021. Republican hold.	▌ ✓ Jake Merrick (Republican) 65.4%; ▌ Molly Ooten (Democratic) 34.6%

=== Pennsylvania ===
District		Incumbent			This race	
Chamber	No.	Representative	Party	First elected	Results	Candidates
House	59	Mike Reese	Republican	2008	Incumbent died January 2, 2021, of a brain aneurysm. New member elected May 18, 2021. Republican hold.	▌ ✓ Leslie Rossi (Republican) 65.0%; ▌ Mariah Fisher (Democratic) 32.5%; ▌ Robb Luther (Libertarian) 2.5%
Senate	48	Dave Arnold	Republican	2020 (special)	Incumbent died January 17, 2021, of brain cancer. New member elected May 18, 2021. Republican hold.	▌ ✓ Chris Gebhard (Republican) 62.0%; ▌ Gavin Clements (Democratic) 30.2%; ▌ Ed Krebs (Independent) 4.8%; ▌ Timothy McMaster (Libertarian) 3.0%
Senate	22	John Blake	Democratic	2010	Incumbent resigned February 15, 2021, to take a position under U.S. Rep. Matt Cartwright. New member elected May 18, 2021. Democratic hold.	▌ ✓ Martin Flynn (Democratic) 51.2%; ▌ Chris Chermak (Republican) 38.5%; ▌ Marlene Sebastianelli (Green) 9.2%; ▌ Nathan Covington (Libertarian) 1.2%
House	60	Jeff Pyle	Republican	2004	Incumbent resigned March 16, 2021, for health reasons. New member elected May 18, 2021. Republican hold.	▌ ✓ Abby Major (Republican) 72.6%; ▌ Frank Prazenica (Democratic) 23.3%; ▌ Andrew Hreha (Libertarian) 4.1%
House	113	Martin Flynn	Democratic	2012	Incumbent resigned June 9, 2021, to join the State Senate. New member elected November 2, 2021. Democratic hold.	▌ ✓ Thom Welby (Democratic) 68.8%; ▌ Dominick Manetti (Republican) 27.7%; ▌ Bonnie Flaherty (Libertarian) 3.5%
House	164	Margo L. Davidson	Democratic	2010	Incumbent resigned July 22, 2021, after being arrested for campaign finance violations. New member elected November 2, 2021. Democratic hold.	▌ ✓ Gina Curry (Democratic) 84.5%; ▌ Brian Sharif Taylor (Republican) 13.4%; ▌ Aniket Josan (Libertarian) 2.1%

=== Rhode Island ===
District		Incumbent			This race	
Chamber	No.	Senator	Party	First elected	Results	Candidates
Senate	3	Gayle Goldin	Democratic	2012	Incumbent resigned August 17, 2021, to join the United States Department of Labor under the Biden administration. New member elected November 2, 2021. Democratic hold.	▌ ✓ Sam Zurier (Democratic) 90.1%; ▌ Alex Cannon (Republican) 9.3%

=== Tennessee ===
District		Incumbent			This race	
Chamber	No.	Representative	Party	First elected	Results	Candidates
House	29	Mike Carter	Republican	2012	Incumbent died May 15, 2021, of pancreatic cancer. New member elected September 14, 2021. Republican hold.	▌ ✓ Greg Vital (Republican) 80.0%; ▌ DeAngelo Jelks (Democratic) 19.8%

=== Texas ===
District		Incumbent			This race	
Chamber	No.	Representative	Party	First elected	Results	Candidates
House	68	Drew Springer	Republican	2012	Incumbent resigned January 6, 2021, to join the Texas Senate. New member elected February 23, 2021. Republican hold.	▌ ✓ David Spiller (Republican) 62.9%; ▌ Craig Carter (Republican) 37.1%
House	10	Jake Ellzey	Republican	2020	Incumbent resigned July 30, 2021, to become a U.S. Representative. General election held August 31. New member elected in runoff September 28, 2021. Republican hold.	▌ ✓ Brian Harrison (Republican) 55.4%; ▌ John Wray (Republican) 44.6%
House	118	Leo Pacheco	Democratic	2018	Incumbent resigned August 19, 2021, to teach public administration at San Antonio College. General election held September 28. New member elected in runoff November 2, 2021. Republican gain	▌ ✓ John Lujan (Republican) 51.2%; ▌ Frank Ramirez (Democratic) 48.8%

=== Virginia ===
District		Incumbent			This race	
Chamber	No.	Representative	Party	First elected	Results	Candidates
House	90	Joseph Lindsey	Democratic	2014 (special)	Incumbent resigned November 15, 2020, to become a Fourth Judicial District judge. New member elected January 5, 2021. Democratic hold.	▌ ✓ Angelia Williams Graves (Democratic) 63.5%; ▌ Sylvia Bryant (Republican) 36.4%
House	2	Jennifer Carroll Foy	Democratic	2017	Incumbent resigned December 12, 2020, to focus on her campaign for governor of Virginia. New member elected January 5, 2021. Democratic hold.	▌ ✓ Candi King (Democratic) 51.7%; ▌ Heather Mitchell (Republican) 48.2%
Senate	38	Ben Chafin	Republican	2014 (special)	Incumbent died January 1, 2021, of COVID-19. New member elected March 23, 2021. Republican hold.	▌ ✓ Travis Hackworth (Republican) 75.7%; ▌ Laurie Buchwald (Democratic) 24.1%

=== Wisconsin ===
District		Incumbent			This race	
Chamber	No.	Representative	Party	First elected	Results	Candidates
Senate	13	Scott L. Fitzgerald	Republican	1994	Incumbent resigned January 1, 2021, to become a U.S. Representative. New member elected April 6, 2021. Republican hold.	▌ ✓ John Jagler (Republican) 51.0%; ▌ Melissa Winker (Democratic) 43.6%; ▌ Spencer Zimmerman (Independent) 4.5%; ▌ Ben Schmitz (American Solidarity) 0.5%
Assembly	89	John Nygren	Republican	2006	Incumbent resigned December 2, 2020, to become executive director of the Wisconsin Association of Health Plans. New member elected April 6, 2021. Republican hold.	▌ ✓ Elijah Behnke (Republican) 63.2%; ▌ Karl Jaeger (Democratic) 36.8%
Assembly	37	John Jagler	Republican	2012	Incumbent resigned April 23, 2021, to join the State Senate. New member elected July 13, 2021. Republican hold.	▌ ✓ William Penterman (Republican) 54.1%; ▌ Pete Adams (Democratic) 44.3%; ▌ Stephen Ratzlaff Jr. (Independent) 1.6%
