= 2021 Georgia state elections =

2021 Georgia elections
- November 2, 2021

Several elections took place in the U.S. state of Georgia in 2021. The municipal general election was held on November 2, 2021.

== United States Senate runoffs ==
Two runoffs for both United States Senate seats in Georgia were held on January 5, 2021.

=== General ===
Incumbent Republican David Perdue, first elected in 2014, lost his reelection bid to challenger Jon Ossoff. Perdue won the first round with 49.73% of the vote, but in the runoff election lost to Ossoff's 50.61% vote share.

=== Special ===
Following the resignation of Senator Johny Isakson in 2019, Governor Brian Kemp appointed Kelly Loeffler to serve out the term. Republican senator Loeffler then went on to come second in the first round with 25.9% of the vote while Democratic pastor Raphael Warnock won with 32.9%. Warnock went on to win in the runoff with 51.04% of the vote, becoming the first black senator to represent Georgia.

== State legislative special elections ==
=== House District 90 special election ===
A special election was called for March 9 for House District 90 following the resignation of Pam Stephenson. Six Democrats qualified for the special election. Stan Winston and Angela Moore advanced to the March 9 runoff, when Moore defeated Winston.

=== House District 34 special election ===
A special election was called for June 15 for House District 34 following Bert Reeves's (R) resignation to become Georgia Institute of Technology's vice president of university relations. Two Democrats, two Republicans and a Libertarian qualified for the special election. Republican Devan Seabaugh and Democrat Priscilla Smith advanced to the July 13 runoff, when Seabaugh defeated Smith.

=== House District 156 special election ===
A special election was called for June 15 after Greg Morris (R) resigned to join the Georgia Department of Transportation's State Transportation Board. Two Republicans and one Democrat qualified for the special election. Republicans Leesa Hagan and Wally Sapp advanced to the July 13 runoff, when Hagan defeated Sapp.

=== House District 165 special election ===
A special election was called for November 2 after the death of Mickey Stephens (D). Four Democrats and one Libertarian qualified for the special election, which was won outright by Edna Jackson.

== Local elections ==
=== Atlanta ===
Elections were held in Atlanta for mayor and city council:

- Andre Dickens defeated Felicia Moore in a runoff.
- All sixteen City Council seats were up for election.

=== Other cities ===
- Warner Robins: LaRhonda Patrick defeated incumbent mayor Randy Toms in a November 30 runoff, becoming the first Black and first woman mayor
