= Sherman Packard =

American politician

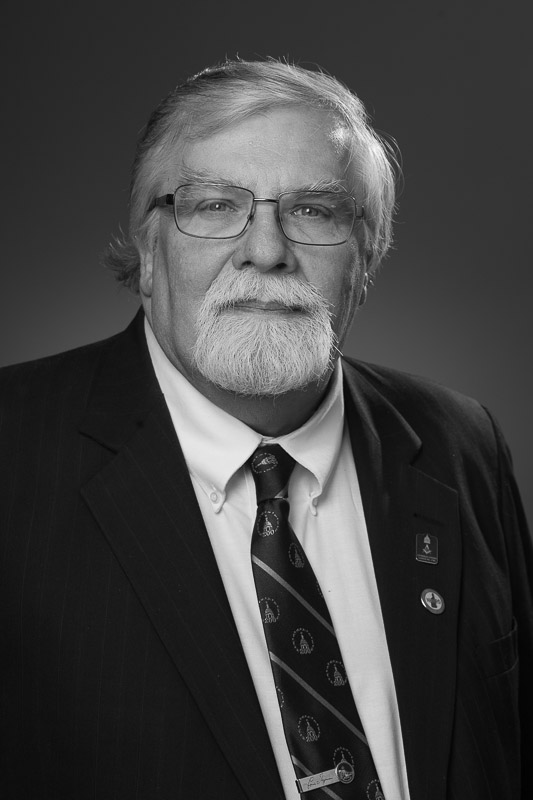

Speaker of the New Hampshire House of Representatives
- Incumbent
- Assumed office December 9, 2020; Acting: December 9, 2020 – January 6, 2021
- Deputy: Steven Smith
- Preceded by: Dick Hinch

Deputy Speaker of the New Hampshire House of Representatives
- In office December 2, 2020 – January 6, 2021
- Leader: Dick Hinch
- Preceded by: Karen Ebel
- Succeeded by: Steven Smith
- In office December 2017 – December 5, 2018
- Leader: Gene Chandler
- Preceded by: Gene Chandler
- Succeeded by: Karen Ebel

Deputy Minority Leader of the New Hampshire House of Representatives
- In office December 5, 2018 – December 2, 2020
- Leader: Dick Hinch
- Preceded by: Cindy Rosenwald
- Succeeded by: David Cote

Speaker pro tempore of the New Hampshire House of Representatives
- In office December 2014 – December 2017
- Leader: Shawn Jasper
- Preceded by: Position established
- Succeeded by: Barbara Griffin

Minority Leader of the New Hampshire House of Representatives
- In office December 2008 – December 2010
- Preceded by: David Hess (acting)
- Succeeded by: Terie Norelli

Member of the New Hampshire House of Representatives from the Rockingham 5th district
- Incumbent
- Assumed office December 5, 1990
- Preceded by: Matthew Sochalski; Vicki Stachowske; David B. Wright

Personal details
- Born: Sherman Adams Packard; February 25, 1949 (age 77) Manchester, New Hampshire, U.S.
- Party: Republican

Sherman Adams Packard (born February 25, 1949) is an American politician in the state of New Hampshire. He is the speaker of the New Hampshire House of Representatives, sitting as a Republican from the Rockingham 5 district, having been first elected in 1990.

== Career ==
Packard was born in Manchester, New Hampshire. He was named after former New Hampshire governor Sherman Adams. His father was Norman A. Packard, a former President of the New Hampshire Senate. He is an automobile upholsterer by trade.

Packard was elected by the New Hampshire House of Representatives Republican caucus to serve as minority leader for the 2008–2010 legislative session. In 2010, after Republicans flipped the chamber, Packard declined to be a candidate for the Republican nomination for the speakership. Conservative Tea Party supporter Bill O’Brien was elected speaker, having defeated the more moderate representative Gene Chandler, an ally of Packard, for the nomination in an upset. O’Brien appointed Packard chair of the transportation committee for the 2010–2012 legislative session.

In December 2014, for the 2014–2016 session, Packard was appointed speaker pro tempore, the house’s third-ranking presiding officer, by speaker Shawn Jasper. He was also appointed vice chair of the legislative administration committee. In November 2017, after the resignation of Speaker Shawn Jasper to serve as New Hampshire Commissioner of Agriculture, Packard was appointed deputy speaker, the house’s second-ranking presiding officer, by newly elected speaker Gene Chandler, the previous deputy speaker. He lost his post as deputy speaker when Democrats flipped the house in the 2018 elections.

For the 2018–2020 legislative session, Packard served as deputy minority leader under minority leader Dick Hinch as well as on the Transportation and Rules Committees.

After the death of newly-elected speaker Dick Hinch on December 9, 2020, Packard, who had again been appointed deputy speaker, told news sources that Hinch had cold-like symptoms that were not COVID-19-related. It was later found that Hinch had indeed died of COVID-19.

Following Hinch's death, Packard became acting speaker of the house, responsible for all chamber administration, committee assignments, floor operations, scheduling and staffing. He was selected by the house Republican caucus as the Republican nominee for speaker after opponents Al Baldasaro and Timothy Lang Sr. withdrew, and was formally elected speaker at the legislature's drive-in session held on January 6, 2021, defeating the Democratic nominee, minority leader Renny Cushing. He then appointed fellow Republican representative Steven Smith as his successor as deputy speaker, retaining the rest of Hinch’s leadership team. Packard also succeeded Hinch as chair of the rules committee.

In 2025, Governor Kelly Ayotte appointed Packard to the Commission on Government Efficiency or "COGE", a commission tasked with cutting spending by the New Hampshire government. COGE is modeled on the Department of Government Efficiency, which does similar work at the federal level.

In June 2026, Packard announced that he would not seek another term as Speaker of the New Hampshire House of Representatives following the 2026 elections. He said he would instead seek reelection to the House as the representative for Rockingham County District 25. Packard stated that after serving as speaker since 2020, he believed it was an appropriate time to allow a new generation of Republican leaders to seek the position.Graham, Michael (June 15, 2026). "Packard: I'll Be Back, But Not As New Hampshire House Speaker". Patch.

== Controversies ==
On April 9, 2021, Packard was heard on a hot mic referring to fellow Republican representative Anne Copp of Derry as a "bitch" when she refused the clerk of the house’s order to wear a mask while walking around the Bedford Sportsplex stadium serving as the house chamber. He formally apologized to Copp and other representatives later in session the same day.

In 2022, Packard introduced a bill to ban motorcycle profiling. In his testimony he claimed he was profiled by the Rye Police Department while riding a motorcycle.

New Hampshire House of Representatives
Preceded by David Hess (acting)	Minority Leader of the New Hampshire House of Representatives; 2008–2010	Succeeded by Terie Norelli
Preceded by Position reestablished	Speaker pro tempore of the New Hampshire House of Representatives; 2016–2017	Succeeded by Barbara Griffin
Political offices
Preceded by Dick Hinch	Speaker of the New Hampshire House of Representatives; 2020–present Acting: 2020–2021	Incumbent
