= Kevin Verville =

American politician from New Hampshire

Member of the New Hampshire House of Representatives from the Rockingham 2nd district
- Incumbent
- Assumed office 2016
- Succeeded by: Will Huebner (elect)

Personal details
- Party: Republican

Kevin Verville is an American Republican politician. He serves in the New Hampshire House of Representatives in Rockingham County alongside Jason Osborne and James Spillane.

== Political career ==
In 2023 he introduced legislation that would legalise psychedelic drugs like LSD and psilocybin mushrooms.

In 2025, the effort to legalize was reduced to decriminalization with HB-528.
