= Catherine Rombeau =

American politician

Member of the New Hampshire House of Representatives from the Hillsborough 7th district
- Incumbent
- Assumed office October 13, 2021
- Preceded by: David Danielson

Personal details
- Party: Democratic
- Education: Amherst College (BA); New York University (JD)

Catherine A. Rombeau is an American politician of the Democratic Party, who is a State Representative for Hillsborough County's 7th district in the New Hampshire House of Representatives. Her 37-vote victory in a special election marked the first flip for Democrats in the 2021 United States state legislative elections, and made her only the second Democrat to be elected to the state house from the town of Bedford, a historically Republican town.

Before being elected to the state legislature, Rombeau was a member of the Bedford City Council.

== Electoral history ==
2020 New Hampshire House of Representatives Hillsborough County 7th district election
| Party | Candidate | Votes | % |
|---|---|---|---|
| Republican | Linda Gould (incumbent) | 7,241 | 9.7 |
| Republican | Niki Kelsey | 7,079 | 9.5 |
| Republican | John Graham (incumbent) | 6,907 | 9.3 |
| Democratic | Sue Mullen (incumbent) | 6,896 | 9.3 |
| Republican | David Danielson (incumbent) | 6,890 | 9.3 |
| Republican | Ted Gorski | 6,747 | 9.1 |
| Republican | Stephen Kenda | 6,370 | 8.6 |
| Democratic | Daniel Dong | 5,717 | 7.7 |
| Democratic | Catherine Rombeau | 5,488 | 7.4 |
| Democratic | Shana Potvin | 5,207 | 7.0 |
| Democratic | Emma Paradis | 5,188 | 7.0 |
| Democratic | Cheri Schmitt | 4,771 | 6.4 |
| Total votes | | 74,501 | 100.0 |
| Republican hold | | | |
| Republican hold | | | |
| Republican hold | | | |
| Democratic hold | | | |
| Republican hold | | | |
| Republican hold | | | |

2021 New Hampshire House of Representatives Hillsborough County 7th district special election
| Party | Candidate | Votes | % |
|---|---|---|---|
| Democratic | Catherine Rombeau | 2,325 | 50.4% |
| Republican | Linda Camarota | 2,288 | 49.6% |
| Total votes | | 4,613 | 100% |
| Democratic gain from Republican | | | |
