= Jason Osborne =

Jason Osborne may refer to:

- Jason Osborne (sportsman)
- Jason Osborne (politician)
