= James Spillane =

American politician from New Hampshire

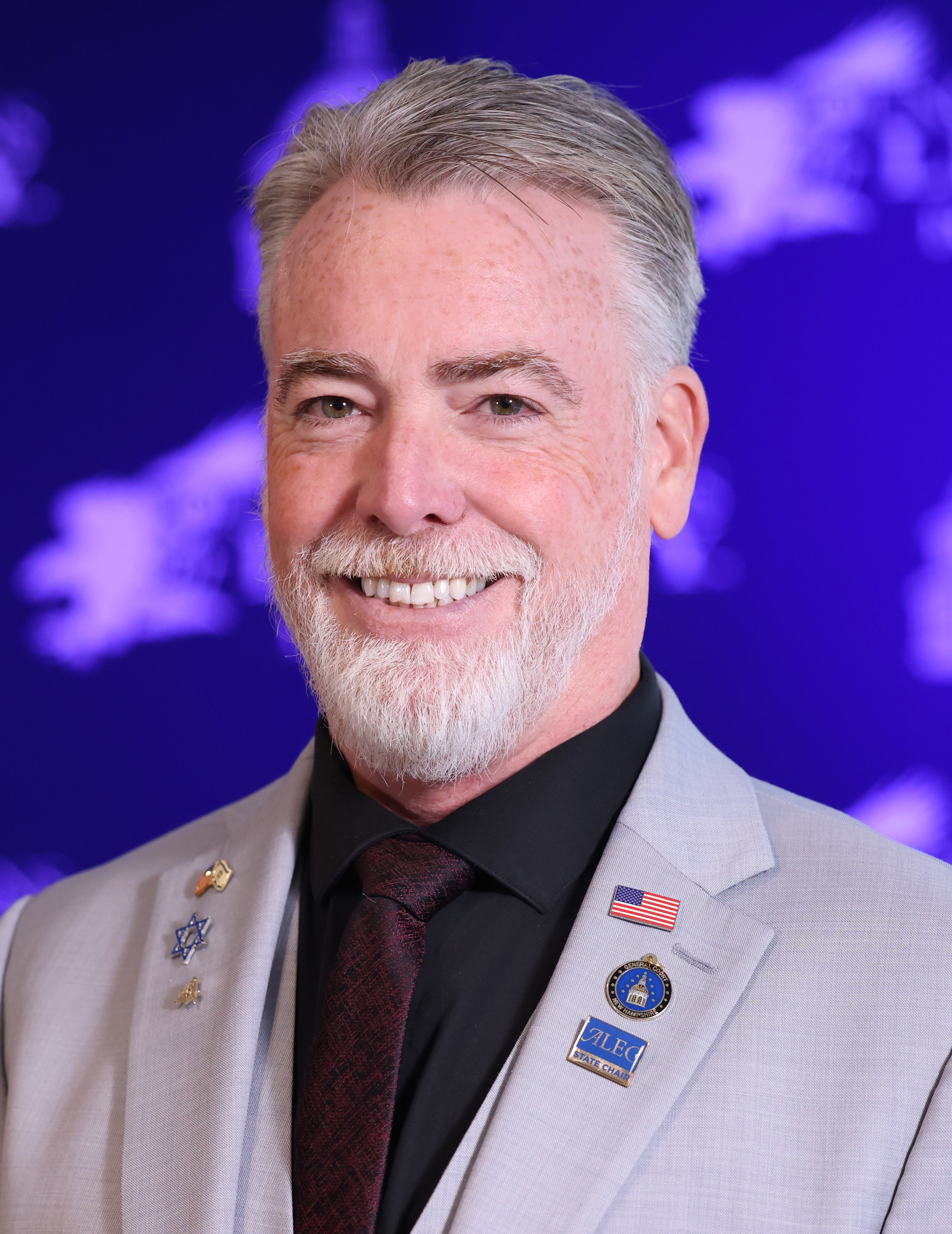
Spillane at the 2024 Hazlitt Summit hosted by Young Americans for Liberty Foundation

James Spillane is an American Republican politician. He serves in the New Hampshire House of Representatives in Rockingham County alongside Jason Osborne and Kevin Verville.

== Political career ==
In June 2023, he switched his endorsement to Ron DeSantis from Donald Trump in the 2024 Republican Party presidential primaries after Trump's criticism of Kayleigh McEnany.

== Controversy ==
In October 2016, during a campaign for the New Hampshire House of Representatives, reporting by the Union Leader detailed previously unreported 2010 convictions involving Spillane. According to court records cited in the report, Spillane pleaded guilty in December 2010 to driving while intoxicated and reckless conduct. As a result, his driver’s license was suspended for nine months, he was fined $500, and he received a one-year suspended jail sentence contingent on good behavior.

The original police complaints referenced in the article alleged that the incident involved a domestic dispute while Spillane’s wife was driving; Spillane denied harming his wife and said he deeply regretted the incident. In a statement to the newspaper, he said he had worked to move on from the episode and emphasized his advocacy against domestic violence since being elected to office.

In May 2017, Spillane was arrested in Pembroke, New Hampshire and charged with driving under the influence (DUI), a yellow line violation, and other related offenses after a police stop on May 4, 2017. He was released on $2,000 personal recognizance bail and scheduled to appear in court on May 19. According to court documents, Spillane had a previous DUI conviction, and he told WMUR that he was contesting the charges, suggesting that someone had called in his license plates as part of ongoing harassment. House Speaker Shawn Jasper commented that due process should take its course and noted legislators are held to a high standard.

In September 2020, Spillane came under investigation by the New Hampshire Department of Justice after posting a comment on Facebook in which he wrote that homes displaying Black Lives Matter signs were "free to loot and burn that house." The post was deleted, and the Attorney General’s Civil Rights Unit received multiple public complaints that it could incite violence and potentially violate the New Hampshire Civil Rights Act. House Speaker Steve Shurtleff called for Spillane’s resignation over the post, while other Republican leaders characterized the remarks as inappropriate but not malicious. The investigation was intended to determine whether his conduct violated state civil rights laws.

In October 2021, a complaint brought before the New Hampshire Legislative Ethics Committee resulted in Spillane being formally admonished for sharing an anti-Semitic image on the social media platform Parler. The committee found that posting the image, which was perceived as offensive and discriminatory, violated the legislature's Principles of Public Service and policies against discrimination. Spillane apologized in writing, stating that he had failed to verify the origins of the image and that it had caused offense. The complaint was raised by several Democratic lawmakers, some of whom described the image as harmful to members of the Jewish faith.

In May 2025, local news reporting described a leaked private chat among Republican state representatives in which a username attributed to Spillane appeared to suggest forms of intimidation or harm toward fellow Republican lawmakers who voted against party leadership’s position. The leaked screenshots, dated April 13, 2025, reportedly included text that referenced revoking committee assignments, attacking property, or other punitive measures against dissenting lawmakers. The screenshots were shared publicly but were not authenticated by Spillane, who did not respond to requests for confirmation. Some peers criticized the rhetoric, noting that threats of violence or property harm against legislators are unlawful under state law, while others interpreted the remarks as hyperbolic. There was no indication that Spillane faced disciplinary action related to these chats at the time of reporting.
