= Steven D. Smith =

American politician

Steve Smith
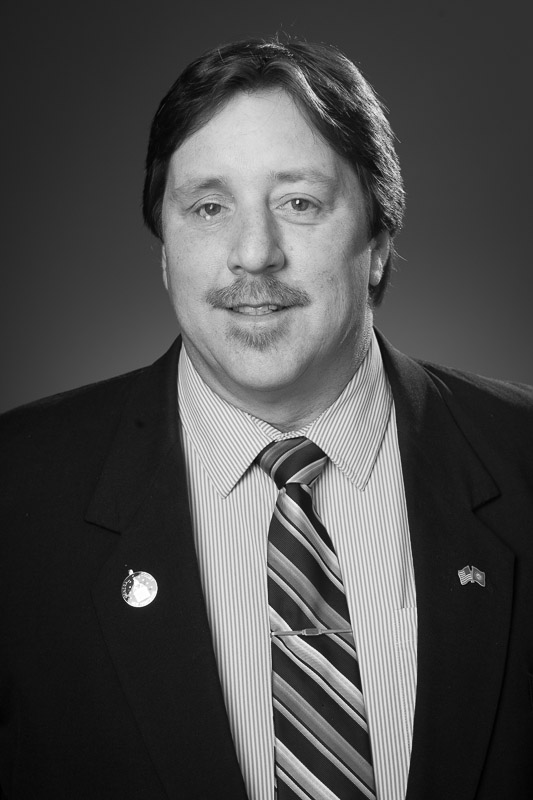

Deputy Speaker of the New Hampshire House of Representatives
- Incumbent
- Assumed office January 6, 2021
- Leader: Sherman Packard
- Preceded by: Sherman Packard

Member of the New Hampshire House of Representatives from the Sullivan 11th district
- Incumbent
- Assumed office December 2010
- Preceded by: James McClammer

Personal details
- Born: June 23, 1964 (age 62) Kew Gardens, New York
- Party: Republican
- Spouse: Adele
- Children: 7
- Education: Hofstra University
- Profession: Real estate broker, Legislator

Steven D. Smith (born June 23, 1964) is an American politician of the Republican party. He is a member of the New Hampshire House of Representatives representing Sullivan County District 11.

== Political career ==
Smith was first elected to the New Hampshire House in 2010 in Sullivan County District 5, and then Sullivan County District 11 (after redistricting) which includes the towns of Acworth, Charlestown, Goshen, Langdon, Lempster, and Washington.

In 2012, Smith introduced legislation that would have created a committee to study the feasibility of Personal Rapid Transit in the state.

In 2014, Smith was appointed Chairman of the House Transportation Committee, and previously served on the Labor, Industrial, and Rehabilitative Services Committee. In 2015, he was appointed by then-Governor Maggie Hassan to the Governor's Interagency Council on Homelessness.

In 2016, Smith was one of ten Legislators from across the country chosen to participate in the Council of State Governments Transportation Policy Academy. In 2018, Smith was appointed Chair of the commission to Study Autonomous Vehicles, elected Chair of the Sullivan County NH Delegation and was appointed as a member of the Electric Vehicle Charging Stations Infrastructure Commission.

In 2021, after the death of house speaker Dick Hinch, Smith was appointed deputy speaker by newly elected speaker Sherman Packard, the previous deputy speaker. As deputy speaker, Smith holds the second highest ranking leadership role of the chamber and would assume the speakership if the incumbent speaker became unable to occupy it.

In June 2026, Smith announced that he would seek election as Speaker of the New Hampshire House of Representatives for the legislative term beginning after the 2026 elections. His candidacy followed Speaker Sherman Packard’s decision not to seek another term as speaker. In announcing his campaign, Smith said he would focus on protecting personal liberty, reducing government spending, expanding educational opportunities for families, and maintaining government accountability. He is one of several Republican candidates seeking the speakership."Deputy Speaker Steven Smith announces run for speaker of the NH House". New Hampshire Public Radio. July 6, 2026.

== Personal life ==
Smith is an enthusiast of classic car , and participant in the slot car hobby.

New Hampshire House of Representatives
Preceded by Sherm Packard	Deputy Speaker of the New Hampshire House of Representatives; 2020-present	Incumbent
