= Wendy Thomas (politician) =

New Hampshire politician

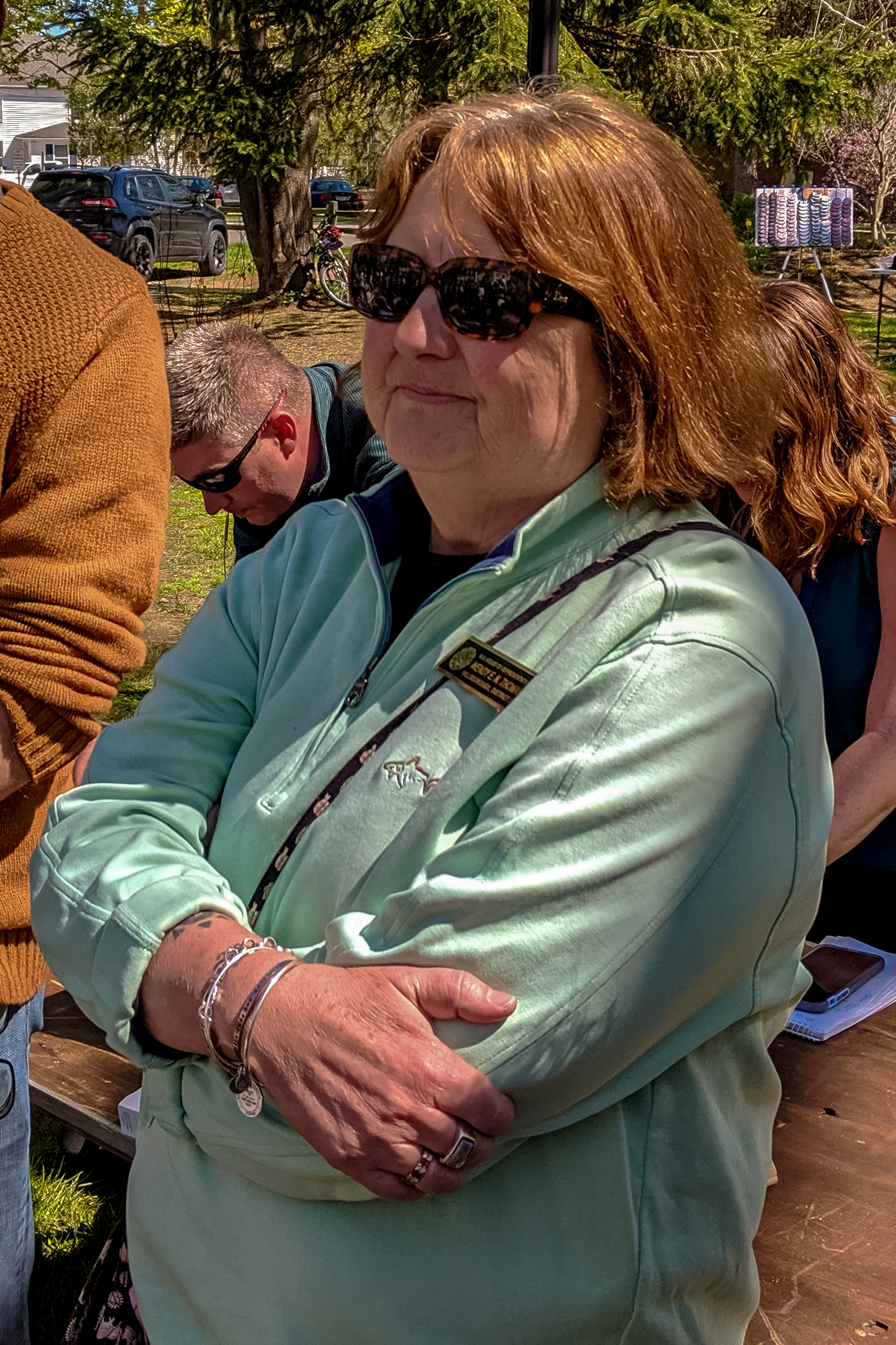
- Thomas in 2019

Member of the New Hampshire House of Representatives from the Hillsborough 21st district
- Incumbent
- Assumed office December 7, 2022
- In office December 5, 2018 – December 1, 2020

Personal details
- Born: 1958 or 1959 (age 67–68)
- Party: Democratic
- Spouse: Marc Nozell
- Children: 6
- Education: University of Connecticut (BA); Sacred Heart University (BS)

Wendy Thomas is an American politician who serves as a member of the New Hampshire House of Representatives, representing Hillsborough District 12, which contains Merrimack, New Hampshire. She assumed office on December 7, 2022 and her term runs through December, 2026. She previously served from 2018-2020. Thomas, a local activist and member of the Democratic Party, successfully ran for the New Hampshire House of Representatives, receiving 6.5% of the vote in the multi-member constituency, placing 7th out of the 8 winning candidates. In 2020, Thomas ran for re-election in the 21st district; however, she was defeated in the general election, receiving 6.2% of the vote and placing 10th.

Following the death of incumbent Dick Hinch, Thomas ran in the April 2021 special election for the 21st district. Thomas was narrowly defeated in the general election by Merrimack town councilor William Boyd III, receiving 2,144 votes to Boyd's 2,531. In June 2022, Thomas declared her intent to run again for the 21st district in the 2022 New Hampshire House of Representatives election. Thomas was elected with 6.41% of the vote, placing 5th out of 8.

In February 2026, Thomas help push a public protest movement against the building of an ICE detention center in Merrimack with an appearance on the Rachel Maddow Show and other news media, focussing on the ineptitude of both federal and state Republican officials. The Trump administration subsequently dropped all plans for the center in Merrimack.

Thomas suffers from long COVID and has publicly advocated for more awareness for the condition.
