= Connecticut's 116th House of Representatives district =

American legislative district

Connecticut's 116th State House of Representatives district
Representative
Treneé McGee; D

Connecticut's 116th House of Representatives district elects one member of the Connecticut House of Representatives. It encompasses parts of New Haven and West Haven and has been represented by Democrat Treneé McGee since 2021.

== List of representatives ==
List of Representatives from Connecticut's 116th State House District
Representative	Party	Years	District home	Note
William T. Blake	Democratic	1967–1971	West Haven	Seat created
Louis S. Votto	Democratic	1971–1973	West Haven	
Richard P. Antonetti	Republican	1973–1975	West Haven	
Russell J. Reynolds	Democratic	1975–1981	West Haven	
Borden P. Steeves	Republican	1981–1983	West Haven	
Joseph A. Adamo	Democratic	1983–1993	West Haven	
Louis Esposito	Democratic	1993–2017	West Haven	
Michael DiMassa	Democratic	2017–2021	West Haven	Resigned following arrest; charged for stealing COVID relief funds
Treneé McGee	Democratic	2021–	Hartford	Elected in special election

== Recent elections ==
=== 2021 special ===
2021 Connecticut House of Representatives special elections, District 116
Party	Candidate	Votes	%
Democratic	Treneé McGee	572	52.6
Republican	Richard DePalma	471	43.3
Independent Party	Portia Bias	45	4.1
Total votes		1,088	100.00
Democratic hold			

=== 2020 ===
2020 Connecticut State House of Representatives election, District 116
Party	Candidate	Votes	%
Democratic	Michael DiMassa (incumbent)	5,178	92.10
Working Families	Michael DiMassa (incumbent)	444	7.90
Total votes		5,622	100.00
Democratic hold			

=== 2018 ===
2018 Connecticut House of Representatives election, District 116
Party	Candidate	Votes	%
Democratic	Michael DiMassa (Incumbent)	3,789	74.5
Republican	Richard DePalma	1,299	25.5
Total votes		5,088	100.00
Democratic hold			

=== 2016 ===
2016 Connecticut House of Representatives election, District 116
Party	Candidate	Votes	%
Democratic	Michael DiMassa	4,699	73.39
Republican	Richard DePalma	1,704	26.61
Total votes		6,403	100.00
Democratic hold			

=== 2014 ===
2014 Connecticut House of Representatives election, District 116
Party	Candidate	Votes	%
Democratic	Louis Esposito (Incumbent)	2,617	64.3
Republican	Steven R. Mullins	954	23.4
Independent Party	Steven R. Mullins	327	8.0
Working Families	Louis Esposito (Incumbent)	145	3.6
Nonpartisan	Aaron M. Haley	27	0.7
Total votes		4,070	100.00
Democratic hold			

=== 2012 ===
2012 Connecticut House of Representatives election, District 116
Party	Candidate	Votes	%
Democratic	Michael DiMassa	5,333	100.00
Total votes		5,333	100.00
Democratic hold			
