= Mary Beth Raven =

American politician

Member-elect of the New Hampshire House of Representatives from the Hillsborough 12th district
- Assuming office December 2026
- Succeeding: Bill Boyd

Personal details
- Party: Democratic

Mary Beth Raven is an American politician. A member of the Democratic Party, she is the member-elect for the Hillsborough 12th district of the New Hampshire House of Representatives.
