= Alexis Simpson =

American politician

Minority Leader of the New Hampshire House of Representatives
- Incumbent
- Assumed office December 4, 2024
- Preceded by: Matthew Wilhelm

Member of the New Hampshire House of Representatives from the Rockingham 33rd district
- Incumbent
- Assumed office December 7, 2022

Personal details
- Party: Democratic
- Education: University of Virginia (BA); Harvard University (MTS); Emory University (MDiv)

Alexis Simpson is an American politician. She serves the minority leader of the New Hampshire House of Representatives as House Democratic Leader. She is the Democratic representative for the Rockingham 33rd district .

== Political career ==
Simpson was first elected to the New Hampshire House of Representatives in 2014. She ran for State Senate in 2016 and lost. Simpson ran for the state house again and won in 2020, 2022, and 2024. Simspon held the role of Deputy House Democratic Leader under leader Matthew Wilhelm during the 2023-2024 session. After being re-elected in 2024, Simpson was elected to become House Democratic Leader and as such became Minority Leader of the House.

New Hampshire House of Representatives
Preceded by Matthew Wilhelm	Minority Leader of the New Hampshire House of Representatives; 2024–present	Incumbent
