= Douglas Ley =

American politician (1958–2021)

Doug Ley

Majority Leader of the New Hampshire House of Representatives
- In office December 5, 2018 – December 2, 2020
- Preceded by: Dick Hinch
- Succeeded by: Jason Osborne

Member of the New Hampshire House of Representatives from the Cheshire 9th district
- In office December 2012 – June 10, 2021 Serving with Richard Ames (2013–2021)
- Preceded by: Multi-member district
- Succeeded by: Andrew Maneval

Personal details
- Born: July 3, 1958 Long Island, New York, U.S.
- Died: June 10, 2021 (aged 62) Jaffrey, New Hampshire, U.S.
- Party: Democratic
- Spouse: Mary
- Children: 2
- Education: Gettysburg College (BA); University of Wisconsin, Madison (MA, PhD)

Douglas A. Ley (July 3, 1958 – June 10, 2021) was an American educator and politician who served in the New Hampshire House of Representatives from Cheshire District 9 from 2013 to 2021, as a member of the Democratic Party. He served as majority leader from 2018 to 2020.

== Early life and education ==
Douglas Ley was born in Long Island, New York and grew up in Valley Stream, New York, and Newtown, Connecticut. Ley graduated from Newtown High School. He graduated from Gettysburg College in 1980, with a bachelor's degree in history. He graduated from with a master's degree in history from the University of Wisconsin–Madison in 1983, and with a Ph.D. in history in 1990. He became a history professor at Franklin Pierce University in 1991. He served as president of his local American Federation of Teachers union from 2013 to 2021, and as president of the state American Federation of Teachers. He married Mary, with whom he had two children.

== New Hampshire House of Representatives ==
=== Elections ===
In 2012, Ley ran for a seat in the New Hampshire House of Representatives from Cheshire District 9 with the Democratic nomination and won in the general election alongside Richard Ames out of four candidates. Ley and Ames won reelection in the 2014 election out of four candidates in the general election. They won reelection in the 2016 election out of four candidates in the general election. They won reelection in the 2018 election out of three candidates. Ley and Ames won reelection in the 2020 election out of four candidates in the general election.

=== Tenure ===
During Ley's tenure he served on the Labor committee from 2013 to 2018. He defeated Representative Dick Hinch in the vote to become Majority Leader of the state house by a vote of 237 to 152 in 2018. He served as Majority Leader from 2018 to 2020.

== Death ==
Ley was hospitalized in May 2021, after cancer spread to his liver. Ley died on June 10, 2021, at the age of 62 at his home in Jaffrey, and was the third member of the state house to have died in the 2021-2022 session of the state house after Speaker Hinch and Representative David Danielson.

== Electoral history ==
Douglas Ley electoral history

2012 New Hampshire House of Representatives Cheshire District 9 election
Primary election
Party	Candidate	Votes	%
Democratic	Richard Ames	685	54.06%
Democratic	Douglas Ley	582	45.94%
Total votes		1,267	100.00%
General election
Democratic	Richard Ames	2,507	30.65%
Democratic	Douglas Ley	2,364	28.90%
Republican	Charlie Moore	1,758	21.49%
Republican	Raymond J. Desmarais	1,542	18.85%
Write-in		8	0.10%
Total votes		8,179	100.00%

2014 New Hampshire House of Representatives Cheshire District 9 Democratic primary
Party	Candidate	Votes	%	±%
Democratic	Richard Ames (incumbent)	340	53.88%	−0.18%
Democratic	Douglas Ley (incumbent)	287	45.48%	−0.46%
Democratic	Roger Creekmore	3	0.48%	N/A
Write-in		1	0.16%	N/A
Total votes		631	100.00%	

2014 New Hampshire House of Representatives Cheshire District 9 election
Party	Candidate	Votes	%	±%
Democratic	Richard Ames (incumbent)	1,806	29.73%	−0.92%
Democratic	Douglas Ley (incumbent)	1,713	28.20%	−0.70%
Republican	Robert Bussiere	1,293	21.29%	N/A
Republican	Roger Creekmore	1,262	20.78%	N/A
Total votes		6,074	100.00%	

2016 New Hampshire House of Representatives Cheshire District 9 Democratic primary
Party	Candidate	Votes	%	±%
Democratic	Richard Ames (incumbent)	610	54.46%	+0.58%
Democratic	Douglas Ley (incumbent)	507	45.27%	−0.21%
Write-in		3	0.27%	+0.11%
Total votes		1,120	100.00%	

2016 New Hampshire House of Representatives Cheshire District 9 election
Party	Candidate	Votes	%	±%
Democratic	Richard Ames (incumbent)	2,424	30.22%	+0.49%
Democratic	Douglas Ley (incumbent)	2,199	27.41%	−0.79%
Republican	Roger Creekmore	1,699	21.18%	+0.40%
Republican	Christopher Mazerall	1,699	21.18%	N/A
Write-in		1	0.01%	N/A
Total votes		8,022	100.00%	

2018 New Hampshire House of Representatives Cheshire District 9 Democratic primary
Party	Candidate	Votes	%	
Democratic	Richard Ames (incumbent)	948	54.89%	+0.43%
Democratic	Douglas Ley (incumbent)	771	44.64%	−0.63%
Write-in		6	0.35%	+0.08%
Democratic	Christopher Mazerall	2	0.12%	N/A
Total votes		1,727	100.00%	

2018 New Hampshire House of Representatives Cheshire District 9 election
Party	Candidate	Votes	%	±%
Democratic	Richard Ames (incumbent)	2,255	38.53%	+8.31%
Democratic	Douglas Ley (incumbent)	2,096	35.81%	+8.40%
Republican	Christopher Mazerall	1,498	25.59%	+4.41%
Write-in		4	0.07%	+0.06%
Total votes		5,853	100.00%	

2020 New Hampshire House of Representatives Cheshire District 9 Democratic primary
Party	Candidate	Votes	%	±%
Democratic	Richard Ames (incumbent)	1,122	50.13%	−4.76%
Democratic	Douglas Ley (incumbent)	1,111	49.64%	+5.00%
Democratic	Rita Mattson	2	0.09%	N/A
Write-in		2	0.09%	-0.26%
Democratic	Leo Plante	1	0.04%	N/A
Total votes		2,238	100.00%	

2020 New Hampshire House of Representatives Cheshire District 9 election
Party	Candidate	Votes	%	±%
Democratic	Richard Ames (incumbent)	2,651	29.50%	−9.03%
Democratic	Douglas Ley (incumbent)	2,475	27.55%	−8.26%
Republican	Rita Mattson	1,964	21.86%	N/A
Republican	Leo Plante	1,894	21.08%	N/A
Write-in		1	0.01%	-0.06%
Total votes		8,985	100.00%	

New Hampshire House of Representatives
Preceded by Dick Hinch	Majority Leader of the New Hampshire House of Representatives; 2018–2020	Succeeded by Jason Osborne
