= Jim Pitts =

American politician (1947–2024)

Texas State Representative for District 10 (Ellis County and part of Henderson County)
- In office January 1993 – January 2015
- Preceded by: Jerry Kenneth Johnson of Nacogdoches
- Succeeded by: John Wray

Personal details
- Born: January 1, 1947 Dallas, Texas, U.S.
- Died: July 20, 2024 (aged 77) Dallas, Texas, U.S.
- Party: Republican
- Spouse: Frances Evelyn Eastham Pitts (m. 1971; d. 2004)
- Children: Duffy P. Bloemendal; Ashley Pitts; Ryan Pitts
- Education: Southern Methodist University; SMU Dedman Law School
- Occupation: Attorney

James R. Pitts (January 1, 1947 – July 20, 2024) was an American politician and lawyer who served in the Texas House of Representatives from 1993 to 2015. He was the chairman of the powerful House Appropriations Committee for four legislative sessions. He was a Republican from Waxahachie in Ellis County, south of his native Dallas, Texas.

== Early life and education ==
Pitts attended Southern Methodist University where he received a Bachelor of Business Administration, a Master of Business Administration, and a Juris Doctor. He practiced law for past thirty-four years in Waxahachie, with a specialty in general and real estate law. He also owned the Ellis County Abstract and Title Company.

== Community involvement ==
Pitts served as a director of Citizens National Bank, based in Waxahachie. He also served as a director of Waxahachie's Sims Library, and served as a past president of the Waxahachie Chamber of Commerce and past president and treasurer of the board of trustees of Presbyterian Children's Services. He also served on the Community Advisory Council for the Scottish Rite Learning Center; was chosen as Waxahachie's "Outstanding Citizen of the Year" in 1999; served on the Board of Trustees at ZACH Theatre in Austin, TX for nearly twenty years; and was named one of Texas' "Ten Best Legislators" in 2005 by the magazine Texas Monthly.

Pitts served for fourteen years as a member of the board of trustees for the Waxahachie Independent School District. He was serving as president of the school board when he was first elected to the Texas House of Representatives in 1992.

== Legislative career ==
Pitts was elected on November 3, 1992, as the state representative for District 10, which comprises Hill and Ellis counties. The district was created from the 1991 redistricting of the state.

During the 1993 session of the Texas Legislature, Pitts served on the House Committees on Economic Development and Transportation. He was appointed to the committees on Criminal Jurisprudence and Corrections for the 74th Legislative Session in 1995. During the 75th Legislative Session, Pitts served as a member of the Appropriations Committee and the State, Federal and International Relations Committee.

=== Introduction of juvenile death penalty legislation ===
In April 1998, Pitts introduced legislation which would have permitted capital punishment for offenders as young as eleven years old, though he stated that the legislation was not crafted with the intent of such sentences becoming commonplace. The legislation did not pass, and was rejected by then-Governor George W. Bush, who stated that he favored the then-present minimum age of seventeen (the minimum age, per the U.S. Supreme Court's ruling in Stanford v. Kentucky (1988) was then sixteen years of age, though Roper v. Simmons (2005) raised this to eighteen).

=== 1999–2009 ===
In 1999, during the 76th Legislative Session, Pitts was appointed to serve on the House Committees for Appropriations, Financial Institutions, and Redistricting; he retained these positions in the 77th Session. Pitts also chaired the Appropriations subcommittees for Regulatory Agencies and Major Information Systems.

He also retained his posts as chairman of the Subcommittee on Regulatory Agencies and as a member of the Select Committee on Teacher Health Insurance.

During 78th Legislative Session in 2003, Pitts served his third term on the House Appropriations Committee, and was appointed to the Ways and Means Committee, and the Redistricting Committee. Pitts was also appointed to serve on the Select Committee on Public School Finance and as chairman of the Subcommittee on High Schools.

Prior to the 79th Legislative Session in 2005, Pitts was chosen to serve as the chairman of the House Appropriations Committee. He was subsequently reappointed chairman at the beginning of the 79th Legislative Session.

During the 81st Legislative Session in 2009, Pitts served as the chairman of the House Appropriations Committee. He also served on the Redistricting Committee, Federal Economic Stabilization Funding Committee, and the Fiscal Stability Committee.

== Target: Tom Craddick ==
In December 2006, just before the commencement of the 80th legislative session, Pitts announced his candidacy for the position of Speaker, held since 2003 by fellow Republican Tom Craddick of Midland. Pitts and colleagues Brian McCall and Senfronia Thompson actively challenged Craddick. In early January 2007, the two Republicans, Pitts and McCall, joined forces with the agreement that Pitts would be put forth as a consensus candidate for Speaker. However, a "test vote" based on a secret ballot failed to show that Pitts could unseat Craddick.

Pitts and fellow Republicans Charlie Geren, Brian McCall, and Robert Talton continued to fight what they called "arm twisting and intimidation," and late in the legislative session, other Republicans such as chairmen Byron Cook of Corsicana, Jim Keffer of Eastland, and Fred Hill, joined the fight to oust Craddick. The attempts to remove the Speaker were then unsuccessful because Craddick asserted that he held the absolute power as Speaker to acknowledge or deny motions, making it implausible, if not impossible, for one of his opponents to be recognized in order to begin the proper parliamentary proceedings necessary to remove the Speaker.

Early in 2009, Pitts joined a small group of Republicans, including Byron Cook, Jim Keffer, and Burt Solomons of North Carrollton, who voted with the Democrats to topple Speaker Craddick and replace him with Joe Straus.

== 2013 budget challenge ==
In 2013, Appropriations chairman Pitts and Speaker Straus faced the task of reconciling an expected $4.7 billion shortfall in the state budget. Since 2003, annual spending by Texas state government has been kept in the lower single digits and below the rates of inflation and population growth. Pitts awaited a report from the retiring Texas Comptroller Susan Combs regarding the expected receipts for the 2013–2014 biennium.

== Admissions controversy at University of Texas-Austin ==
Pitts became ensnared in an admissions "clout" scandal at the University of Texas at Austin in 2013. Publicly available documents revealed that Pitts and two other members of the House sent more letters to the president of the University of Texas on behalf of applicants than anyone else whose correspondence was included in a recent inquiry into admissions favoritism.

The University of Texas System retained Kroll, Inc. to investigate admissions practices at the University of Texas-Austin. The investigation was expanded in December 2014 by former UT System Chancellor Francisco G. Cigarroa.

== Personal life ==
Pitts was born in Dallas, Texas on January 1, 1947. He was the twin son (with John R. Pitts) of Roy Eugene Pitts and Agnes Theresa Maloney, who currently live in Henderson County. His sister, Rosemary Burns, lives in Henderson County where Pitts resided before he died.

In 1971, he married the former Frances Evelyn Eastham; she died in an automobile accident in June 2004. They had three children: daughters Duffy and Ashley and son Ryan. All three of his children are graduates of Southern Methodist University. Duffy is married to Dr. Scott Bloemendal and the mother of three children (Jackson, Will and Owen). Ashley is the Director of Development for the Cox School of Business at Southern Methodist University and is the mother of one child (Margaret). Ryan is a graduate of the University of Texas School of Law and is currently the chief executive officer at Ellis County Title Company. Ryan is married to Faith Anne Pustmueller and they have two children (Evelyn and Reagan).

=== Retirement and death ===
Pitts did not seek reelection to the state House in 2014. He was succeeded in the position by another Waxahachie Republican, John Wray, who won a runoff contest on May 27 with T. J. Fabby, 6,031 votes (52.9 percent) to 5,363 (47.1 percent). He died in Dallas on July 20, 2024, at the age of 77.

Texas House of Representatives
Preceded by Jerry Kenneth Johnson (then Jasper, Nacogdoches, Sabine, and Shelby counties)	Texas State Representative for District 10 (Ellis and Henderson counties); 1993–2015	Succeeded by John Wray
