= Will Huebner =

American politician

Member-elect of the New Hampshire House of Representatives from the Rockingham 2nd district
- Assuming office December 2026
- Succeeding: Kevin Verville

Personal details
- Party: Republican

Will Huebner is an American politician. A member of the Republican Party, he is the member-elect for the Rockingham 2nd district of the New Hampshire House of Representatives.
