= 2021 Texas elections =

- November 2, 2021

Elections were held in Texas on November 2, 2021, including a special election to congress, multiple special elections to the Texas House of Representatives, eight legislatively referred ballot measures on the November 2 ballot, and many regularly scheduled local elections.

== Federal ==
=== Congress ===
==== Texas's 6th congressional district special election ====
The 2021 Texas's 6th congressional district special election was caused by the death of incumbent Republican Ron Wright on February 7. A nonpartisan blanket primary was held on May 5. No candidate won over 50% of the vote, leading to a run-off between Jake Ellzey, a member of the Texas House of Representatives from the 10th district, and Susan Wright, the widow of Ron Wright—both of whom were Republicans. The run-off was held on July 27 and won by Jake Ellzey with 53.27% of the vote.

2021 Texas's 6th congressional district special election
Party	Candidate	Votes	%
Republican	Susan Wright	15,077	19.21
Republican	Jake Ellzey	10,865	13.85
Democratic	Jana Sanchez	10,518	13.40
Republican	Brian Harrison	8,485	10.81
Democratic	Shawn Lassiter	6,973	8.89
Republican	John Anthony Castro	4,321	5.51
Democratic	Tammy Allison Holloway	4,240	5.40
Democratic	Lydia Bean	2,923	3.72
Republican	Michael Wood	2,509	3.20
Republican	Michael Ballantine	2,225	2.84
Republican	Dan Rodimer	2,088	2.66
Democratic	Daryl J. Eddings Sr.	1,654	2.11
Republican	Mike Egan	1,544	1.97
Democratic	Patrick Moses	1,189	1.52
Democratic	Manuel R. Salazar III	1,120	1.43
Republican	Sery Kim	889	1.13
Republican	Travis Rodermund	460	0.59
Independent	Adrian Mizher	351	0.45
Democratic	Brian K. Stephenson	271	0.35
Libertarian	Phil Gray	265	0.34
Democratic	Matthew Hinterlong	252	0.32
Republican	Jennifer Garcia Sharon	150	0.19
Democratic	Chris Suprun	102	0.13
Total votes		78,471	100.00

2021 Texas's 6th congressional district special runoff election
Party	Candidate	Votes	%
Republican	Jake Ellzey	20,837	53.27
Republican	Susan Wright	18,279	46.73
Total votes		39,116	100.00
Republican hold			

== State ==
=== Legislative ===
==== House of Representatives 68th district special election ====
The 2021 Texas's 68th House of Representatives district special election was caused by the resignation of incumbent Republican Drew Springer on January 6 to join the Texas Senate. The special election took place on February 23. A nonpartisan blanket primary was held on January 23. No candidate won over 50% of the vote, leading to a run-off between David Spiller and Craig Carter, both Republicans. The run-off was held on February 23, 2021, and won by Spiller with 62.9% of the vote.

2021 Texas House of Representatives 68th district special election
Party	Candidate	Votes	%
Republican	David Spiller	4,015	43.89%
Republican	Craig Carter	1,652	18.06%
Republican	John Berry	1,594	17.43%
Republican	Jason Brinkley	1,491	16.30%
Democratic	Charles D. Gregory	395	4.32%
Total votes		9,147	100%

2021 Texas House of Representatives 68th district special runoff election
Party	Candidate	Votes	%
Republican	David Spiller	4,192	62.90%
Republican	Craig Carter	2,473	37.10%
Total votes		6,665	100%
Republican hold			

==== House of Representatives 10th district special election ====
The 2021 Texas's 10th House of Representatives district special election was caused by the resignation of incumbent Republican Jake Ellzey on July 30 to become a U.S. Representative after winning the 2021 Texas's 6th congressional district special election. A nonpartisan blanket primary was held on August 31. No candidate won over 50% of the vote, leading to a run-off between Brian Harrison, a former Trump administration official, and John Wray, who previously held the 10th seat—both Republicans. The run-off was held on September 28 and won by Harrison with 55.38% of the vote.

2021 Texas House of Representatives 10th district special election
Party	Candidate	Votes	%
Republican	Brian Harrison	4,613	40.70
Republican	John Wray	4,031	35.57
Democratic	Pierina Otiniano	1,281	11.30
Republican	Kevin Griffin	883	7.79
Republican	Clark Wickliffe	351	3.10
Independent	Scott Goodwin	107	0.94
Republican	Susan Mellina Hayslip	37	0.33
Libertarian	Matt Savino	31	0.27
Total votes		11,334	100.0%

2021 Texas House of Representatives 10th district special runoff election
Party	Candidate	Votes	%
Republican	Brian Harrison	6,717	55.38
Republican	John Wray	5,412	44.62
Total votes		11,334	100.0%
Republican hold			

==== House of Representatives 118th district special election ====
The 2021 Texas's 118th House of Representatives district special election was caused by the resignation of incumbent Democrat Leo Pacheco on August 19 to teach public administration at San Antonio College. A nonpartisan blanket primary was held on September 28. No candidate won over 50% of the vote, leading to a run-off between Republican John Lujan, who previously represented the district, and Democrat Frank Ramirez. The run-off was held on November 2 and the seat was flipped by Lujan with about 51% of the vote.

2021 Texas House of Representatives 118th district special election
Party	Candidate	Votes	%
Republican	John Lujan	2,938	41.53%
Democratic	Frank Ramirez	1,416	20.01%
Democratic	Desi Martinez	1,244	17.58%
Democratic	Katie Farias	854	12.07%
Republican	Charles D. Gregory	623	8.81%
Total votes		7,075	100%

2021 Texas House of Representatives 118th district special runoff election
Party	Candidate	Votes	%
Republican	John Lujan	5,924	51.24%
Democratic	Frank Ramirez	5,638	48.76%
Total votes		11,562	100%
Republican gain from Democratic			

=== Ballot measures ===
Eight ballot measures appeared on the November 2, 2021 general election ballot in Texas. All eight propositions were passed.

==== Proposition 1 ====
Proposition 1, the Authorize Charitable Raffles at Rodeo Venues Amendment, amended the state constitution to allow raffles to be conducted at rodeo venues.

==== Proposition 2 ====
Proposition 2, the Authorize Counties to Issue Infrastructure Bonds in Blighted Areas Amendment, amended the state constitution to allow counties to issue bond to fund transportation projects in blighted areas, within certain restrictions.

==== Proposition 3 ====
Proposition 3, the Prohibition on Limiting Religious Services or Organizations Amendment, amended the state constitution to "prohibit the state or any political subdivision from enacting a law, rule, order, or proclamation that limits religious services or organizations".

==== Proposition 4 ====
Proposition 4, the Changes to Eligibility for Certain Judicial Offices Amendment, amended the state constitution to change eligibility requirements for various judicial offices in the state of Texas.

==== Proposition 5 ====
Proposition 5, the State Commission on Judicial Conduct Authority Over Candidates for Judicial Office Amendment, amended the state constitution to allow the State Commission on Judicial Conduct to investigate and discipline candidates seeking judicial office in the same manner as they can investigate and discipline current officeholders.

==== Proposition 6 ====
Proposition 6, the Right to Designated Essential Caregiver Amendment, amended the state constitution to "establish a right for residents of nursing or assisted living facilities to designate an essential caregiver, who cannot be prohibited from in-person visitation".

==== Proposition 7 ====
Proposition 7, the Homestead Tax Limit for Surviving Spouses of Disabled Individuals Amendment, amended the state constitution to "allow the surviving spouse of a disabled individual to maintain a homestead property tax limit if the spouse is 55 years of age or older at the time of the death and remains at the homestead".

==== Proposition 8 ====
Proposition 8, the Homestead Tax Exemption for Surviving Spouses of Military Fatally Injured in the Line of Duty Amendment, amended the state constitution to "allow the legislature to provide a homestead property tax exemption for the surviving spouse of a military member 'killed or fatally injured in the line of duty'", as opposed to the status quo which only allows an exemption for spouses of those designated killed in action.

== See also ==
- 2021 United States state legislative elections
