= Jude Saves the World =

2023 children's book by Ronnie Riley

- Author: Ronnie Riley
- Language: English
- Genre: Children's book; Middle grade fiction
- Publisher: Scholastic
- Publication date: April 18, 2023
- Publication place: United States
- Pages: 272
- ISBN: 978-1-338-85587-6

Jude Saves the World is a children’s book written by the Canadian writer Ronnie Riley which was published in 2023 by Scholastic Press. The first-person narrative relates the experiences of a 12-year-old non-binary person who calls themself Jude. Over the course of the school year, together with their best friend, Dallas, and help from the local librarian, Jude fulfils their wish to establish a safe space in the library where people of all ages can meet and talk about their own experiences at school, at work, with friends and family. A discussion of the LGBTQ themes in this book during a college course on Children’s Literature in the summer of 2025 within the College of Arts and Sciences at Texas A&M University led a few weeks later to the dismissal of the course instructor, the demotion of two college administrators, the resignation of the president of the university, and resulted in nation-wide media attention.

== Plot ==
Twelve-year-old non-binary Jude, whose deadname is never given in the story, lives with their single-mother in a small town and attends a middle-school. Jude uses the pronouns they/them/theirs at school and at home, after coming out to their mother and closest friend, Dallas, who is openly gay. Jude also struggles with ADHD and occasionally receives special support from a specialist at school.

Dallas and Jude have been best friends for a long time and spend most of their days together at school, where they are outsiders among their classmates, and after school on the playground or at the home of Dallas and his five sisters. When they befriend a girl named Stevie after she has been ostracized at school by a clique of girls led by Tessa, she gladly joins in their activities for a time. However, their friendship with Stevie is abruptly broken off when she rekindles her friendship with the leader of the clique.

Meanwhile, Jude proposes to the school administrators that a club for LGBTQ pupils be organized, but the principal rejects the idea as “too early” for their conservative community. At first disappointed, Jude later decides to approach the local town librarian and finds welcoming adult supporters. After posting announcements of the inaugural meeting around town, there is a large turnout of people with many different backgrounds and they continue to meet twice a month at the “RSS”, the safe space in the library.

Each week Jude must accompany their mother to her parents' home for dinner. Their mother warns them that their grandparents are too conservative to understand their identity as a non-binary person and forbids Jude from bringing up the subject with them. Jude has a warm relationship with their grandmother, but perceives their grandfather as cold, uncommunicative and stuck in his patriarchal habits. One evening Jude gives way to their emotional stress and bursts out with their desire to be called Jude and be addressed with the proper pronouns, causing a weeks-long rupture in their relationship with their grandparents (“grand-ghosts”).

At the end of the book, after a series of turbulent developments in the lives of Jude and Dallas, the two friends are able to reconcile with Stevie, as does Jude with their grandparents. In jest, Dallas suggests that Jude write an autobiography which could be titled “Jude Saves the World”. When they enter the classroom of their English teacher, Mrs. Bayley, they learn that the next project will be “To write a creative story with yourself as the main character going on a life-changing journey.”

The story is written in the first-person from Jude’s perspective and deals intensively with the feelings of a young teenager learning to navigate their identity, their social interactions in different contexts, the demands of school assignments, and the need to cope with the at times dramatic effects of adults’ behaviour and attitudes.

The book includes an author’s note and six-page appendix titled “Queer Glossary”.

== Reception ==
In a review in Kirkus Reviews Riley’s debut novel Jude Saves the World was considered to be “well intentioned but forgettable” and it was pointed out that the main characters sounded middle-aged and engaged in “treacly dialogue”. The reviewer at Publishers Weekly found the book a “positive read” and noted that Jude is “an endearingly earnest narrator, and their supportive bond with Dallas…models healthy, consensual, enthusiastic camaraderie”.

=== Controversy ===
On September 10, 2025, The Texas Tribune, a non-profit digital news outlet based in Austin, Texas, was the first to carry a report that Dr. Melissa McCoul, a literature course instructor, had been fired the previous day from Texas A&M University. Since earning a doctorate in English from the University of Notre Dame in 2017, where she specialized in children’s literature and gender studies, she was now a senior lecturer in the English Department and had reportedly conducted the course on children’s literature 12 times. In describing the course, McCoul wrote in the syllabus,

Some of the material in this class might be controversial, and it is likely differing opinions will emerge. You are certainly not required to agree with me (or your peers), or to adhere to any particular viewpoints…

On July 29, 2025, during the course “ENGL 360 – Children’s Literature”, she was discussing the middle-school novel Jude Saves the World and providing additional context to the topics of gender and sexual identity. One of the students in the class interrupted the instructor and captured their interaction on video. The student is heard stating:

"I'm not entirely sure this is legal to be teaching because according to our president, there's only two genders and he said he would be freezing agencies' funding programs that promote gender ideology. And this also very much goes against, not only myself but a lot of people's religious beliefs."

The instructor stated her disagreement with this position and after further discussions, asked the student to leave the classroom.

Subsequently the student met with the president of the university, Mark A. Welsh III, who initially defended McCoul and her academic freedom. The original classroom recording and the recording of the conversation with President Welsh were published on social media around September 8 or 9th, by Texas state Rep. Brian Harrison, setting off the series of actions within the university as well as nationwide coverage of the controversy over the following ten days.

In addition to the firing of McCoul, the dean of the College of Arts and Sciences and the head of the English department were demoted. Soon thereafter President Welsh also resigned from his university post. According to a report by Fox News on September 10:

"The Texas A&M University System Board of Regents released a statement Wednesday calling for an audit of all of its courses after a student was allegedly removed from a class for questioning transgender-related course content."

A report of the firing of McCoul was released on the news service Associated Press on September 11, and further detailed reporting about the matter and the issues involved following upon the resignation of President Welsh, were featured in newspapers such as The New York Times, The Washington Post, The New Republic, USA Today, The Wall Street Journal, in papers focussing on education such as The Chronicle of Higher Education and The College Fix, and on broadcasting networks such as NBCNews, CBS News, and Fox News.

In September 2025, Texas A&M's Academic Freedom Council, a faculty committee, found that McCoul's firing violated her academic freedom, that it was based on the content of her course, and that former president Welsh did not follow university rules for dismissal. The school administration rejected the report, saying that the matter was not about academic freedom and that it did not have jurisdiction, since McCoul already appealed to the Committee on Academic Freedom Responsibility and Tenure, a faculty body that did formal reviews of dismissals. In November, the Committee on Academic Freedom Responsibility and Tenure ruled that McCoul was wrongly fired, none of the reasons for her dismissal applied, and that the university did not investigate or follow its own processes. It also found that the student ought to have been investigated.

== Awards and Honours ==
- An ALA Rainbow Book (2024)
- Shortlisted, Hackmatack Children's Choice Award (Atlantic Canada) 2024
- Shortlisted, OLA Silver Birch Award, Fiction 2024
- Commended, OLA Best Bets 2024
