= Bill Boyd (New Hampshire politician) =

New Hampshire politician

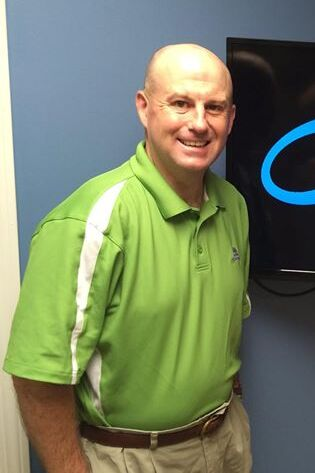
- Boyd in 2015

Member of the New Hampshire House of Representatives
- Incumbent
- Assumed office April 13, 2021
- Preceded by: Dick Hinch
- Succeeded by: Mary Beth Raven (elect)
- Constituency: Hillsborough 21st district (2021–2022); Hillsborough 12th district (2022–present)

Personal details
- Born: William Warman Boyd III; 1968 or 1969 (age 57–58)
- Party: Republican
- Spouse: Michele Belushko
- Children: 1
- Education: Boston College (BA)

William Warman Boyd III (born 1968 or 1969) is an American politician and real estate title examiner who is a member of the New Hampshire House of Representatives. Originally elected in an April 2021 special election to succeed Dick Hinch, the former speaker of the New Hampshire House of Representatives who died of COVID-19 in December 2020, to represent the Hillsborough 21st district, he has represented the Hillsborough 12th district since 2022. A member of the Republican Party, he is originally from Medford, Massachusetts.

Boyd graduated from Medford High School in 1987. He graduated from Boston College with a Bachelor of Arts in political science in 1991. In April 2021, Boyd defeated former state representative Wendy E. N. Thomas, the Democratic nominee in the special election to succeed Dick Hinch, by a margin of 2,531 votes to 2,144. Boyd's campaign was supported by Mike Pompeo, a former United States secretary of state, and Tom Cotton, a United States senator from Arkansas.

Boyd has previously served on the Merrimack Town Council, the Merrimack Planning Board, the Nashua Regional Planning Board, and the New Hampshire Drinking and Groundwater Advisory Commission. His wife Michele is a certified registered nurse anesthetist and they are both owners of the Midnight Run Racing Kennel.
