= Georgia's 34th House of Representatives district =

State district in Georgia, USA

Georgia's 34th State House of Representatives district
Representative
Devan Seabaugh; R–Marietta
- Demographics: 63.5% White; 20.6% Black; 8.7% Hispanic; 4.5% Asian
- Population: 57,796

District 34 elects one member of the Georgia House of Representatives. It contains parts of Cobb County.

== Members ==
- Bert Reeves (2015–2021)
- Devan Seabaugh (since 2021)
