= Matthew Wilhelm =

American politician

Matt Wilhelm

Minority Leader of the New Hampshire House of Representatives
- In office December 7, 2022 – December 4, 2024
- Preceded by: David Cote
- Succeeded by: Alexis Simpson

Member of the New Hampshire House of Representatives from the Hillsborough 42nd district
- Incumbent
- Assumed office December 5, 2018

Personal details
- Party: Democratic
- Education: Plymouth State University (BA); University of New Hampshire (MPA)

Matthew Wilhelm is a New Hampshire politician.

== Education ==
Wilhelm earned an Masters in Public Administration (M.P.A.) from the Carsey School of Public Policy at the University of New Hampshire.

== Career ==
On November 6, 2018, Wilhelm was elected to the New Hampshire House of Representatives where he represents the Hillsborough 42 district. Wilhelm assumed office on December 5, 2018. Wilhelm is a Democrat.

== Personal life ==
Wilhelm resides in Manchester, New Hampshire. Wilhelm is married and has two children.

New Hampshire House of Representatives
Preceded by David Cote	Minority Leader of the New Hampshire House of Representatives; 2022–2024	Succeeded by Alexis Simpson
