= John Wray (politician) =

American politician (born 1970)

Member of the Texas House of Representatives from the 10th district
- In office January 13, 2015 – January 12, 2021
- Preceded by: Jim Pitts
- Succeeded by: Jake Ellzey

Personal details
- Born: November 20, 1970 (age 55) Hillsboro, Texas, U.S.
- Party: Republican
- Spouse: Michele
- Children: 2
- Education: Texas A&M University (BS); University of Texas (JD)

John Christian Wray (born November 20, 1970) is an American lawyer, businessman, and politician. He is the current County Judge of Ellis County, Texas. He served as a member of the Texas House of Representatives for the 10th district from 2015 to 2021. Wray is a member of Republican Party. He lost the special election race for District 10 on September 28, 2021.

== Early life and education ==
Wray graduated from Waxahachie High School in 1989. He earned a Bachelor of Science degree in political science from Texas A&M University and a Juris Doctor from the University of Texas School of Law.

== Career ==
He is a former mayor of Waxahachie and past member of the Waxahachie City Council. He practiced law for six years in Houston, Texas, prior to returning to Waxahachie. He is the co-owner of Town Square Title, a title company. Wray was first elected in 2014 to represent Texas House District 10. In July 2019, Wray publicized that he would not run for re-election for District 10, of the Texas State House of Representatives. In a news release he stated that, "these elected jobs are not meant to be lifetime positions". Two years later on July 29, 2021, Wray announced his candidacy for District 10 in a special election to replace Jake Ellzey, who vacated the district seat after winning he 2021 Texas's 6th congressional district special election two days prior.

=== Waxahachie City Council (2008–2014) ===
Wray served on the Waxahachie City Council from 2008 to 2014. During his tenure, he served as Mayor Pro Tem from 2010 to 2013. In 2013, the City Council selected Wray to serve as Mayor of Waxahachie, a position he held until May of 2014.

While serving as Mayor of Waxahachie, in September 2013, Wray announced his candidacy for the Texas House of Representatives in District 10. He was subsequently elected to the Texas House in 2014 and assumed office in January 2015.

=== Texas House of Representatives (2015–2021) ===
Wray was elected to the Texas House of Representatives in November 2014, representing District 10, which included Ellis County and part of Henderson County. He took office in January 2015 and was reelected in 2016 and 2018, serving three consecutive terms through January 2021.

During his legislative tenure, Wray served on several House committees, including Ways and Means, Homeland Security and Public Safety, Transportation, Calendars, and Public Health. During the 85th Legislature (2017–2019), he served as co-chair of the Joint Committee on State Judicial Salaries. In the 86th Legislature (2019–2021), he served as vice chair of the House Committee on Public Health and was a member of the Calendars and Ways and Means committees.

=== Ellis County Judge (2025–present) ===
On May 7, 2025, the Ellis County Commissioners Court voted to appoint Wray as county judge. Wray was selected from eight applicants interviewed for the position. Wray was sworn into office on May 15, 2025. He was appointed to serve the remainder of an unexpired term, scheduled to expire on December 31, 2026.

== Elections ==
Wray won a runoff election on May 27, 2014, against T. J. Fabby with 6,031 votes (52.9 percent) to 5,363 (47.1 percent), for the right to succeed the retiring Republican representative Jim Pitts, who had held the seat since 1993.

In the general election held on November 6, 2018, Wray retained his House seat for a third term. With 44,601 votes (70.3 percent), he defeated Democrat Kimberly Emery, who polled 17,405 votes (27.4 percent). A Libertarian, Matt Savino, polled another 1,453 ballots (2.3 percent).

In 2021, Wray announced his candidacy for the Texas House of Representatives District 10 special election to replace Jake Ellzey, who vacated the district seat after winning Texas's 6th congressional district special election. Wray was endorsed by Texans for Lawsuit Reform. The special election was held on August 31, 2021, and Wray placed second with 36 percent of the vote with 4,031 votes and Brian Harrison placed first with 41 percent of the vote with 4,613 votes. He and Harrison faced each other in a runoff election which he lost against Harrison 55.38% to 44.62%.

== Personal life ==
Wray and his wife, Michele, have two children.

Texas House of Representatives
Preceded by Jim Pitts	Member of the Texas House of Representatives from the 10th district 2015–2021	Succeeded by Jake Ellzey
