= Niki Kelsey =

American politician

Member of New Hampshire House of Representatives for Hillsborough 7
- In office December 2, 2020 – December 7, 2022
- Preceded by: Linda Camarota
- Succeeded by: Sherry Dutzy

Personal details
- Party: Republican

Niki Kelsey is an American politician. She was elected a member of the New Hampshire House of Representatives in the 2020 election.
