= Abe M. Hudson Jr. =

American politician

Member of the Mississippi House of Representatives from the 29th district
- In office July 25, 2016 – November 3, 2021
- Succeeded by: Robert L. Sanders

Personal details
- Born: September 30, 1976 (age 49) Hollandale, Mississippi, U.S.
- Party: Democratic
- Education: University of Southern Mississippi (BBA); Mississippi State University (MBA, MS); Jackson State University (PhD)

Abe M. Hudson Jr. (born September 30, 1976) is an American politician who served as a member of the Mississippi House of Representatives for the 29th district from July 25, 2016 to 2021.

== Early life and education ==
Hudson was born in Hollandale, Mississippi and graduated from T.L. Weston High School. He earned a Bachelor of Business Administration in marketing from the University of Southern Mississippi, a Master of Business Administration and Master of Science from Mississippi State University, and a PhD in city, urban, and regional planning from Jackson State University.

== Career ==
Hudson worked as a visiting professor of business at Delta State University. Since 2002, he has owned a private consulting company. He was elected to the Mississippi House of Representatives in a special election and assumed office on July 25, 2016. In the 2020–2021 legislative session, Hudson served as vice chair of the House Ports, Harbors and Airports Committee.

Hudson announced his candidacy for the Mississippi State Senate District 11 seat, representing Desoto, Tate, Tunica, Quitman, and Coahoma counties, in June 2025.
