= Renny Cushing =

American politician (1952–2022)

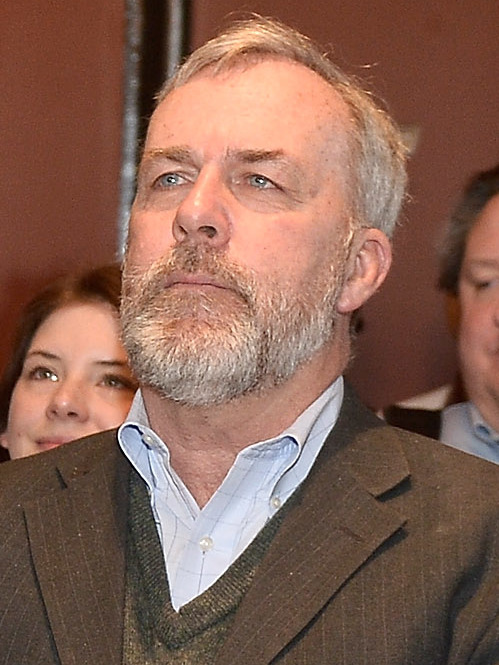

Minority Leader of the New Hampshire House of Representatives
- In office December 2, 2020 – March 7, 2022; On leave: March 2, 2022 – March 7, 2022
- Preceded by: Dick Hinch
- Succeeded by: David Cote

Member of the New Hampshire House of Representatives
- In office December 2012 – March 7, 2022
- Constituency: Rockingham 21st
- In office December 2008 – December 2010
- Constituency: Rockingham 15th
- In office December 1996 – December 1998
- Constituency: Rockingham 22nd
- In office December 1986 – December 1988
- Constituency: Rockingham 14th

Personal details
- Born: Robert Reynolds Cushing Jr. July 20, 1952 Portsmouth, New Hampshire, U.S.
- Died: March 7, 2022 (aged 69) Hampton, New Hampshire, U.S.
- Party: Democratic
- Education: Granite State College

Robert Reynolds Cushing Jr. (July 20, 1952 – March 7, 2022) was an American politician who was a member of the New Hampshire House of Representatives as a Democrat from the town of Hampton. First elected in 1996, Cushing represented Rockingham District 21. He served nine non-consecutive terms (previously representing Rockingham Districts 14, 15 and 22).

== Early life and education ==
Cushing was born in Portsmouth, New Hampshire, to Robert R. Cushing Sr and Marie (Mulcahy) Cushing. At the age of 15, he spoke at the State House and argued in favor of lowering the voting age from 21 to 18.

He was raised in Hampton, New Hampshire with his six younger siblings and graduated from Winnacunnet High School in Hampton. He also later served as the elected moderator of the Winnacunnet School District from 1993.

He briefly attended Granite State College, before dropping out and working a number of miscellaneous jobs across the US as well as Canada, including as a sanitation worker, a miner, and a farmworker. He then settled back in New Hampshire and took up welding and carpentry.

== Political career ==
Cushing's first foray into civic engagement was in the 1970s, when he was involved with the Clamshell Alliance, an anti-nuclear coalition that opposed construction of the Seabrook Station Nuclear Power Plant in nearby Seabrook, New Hampshire. In June 1988, Cushing's father was murdered by a disgruntled off-duty policeman in his own house. He became involved with the trial of his father’s murderer and began advocating to abolish capital punishment. In 1998, he became executive director of Murder Victims’ Families for Reconciliation.

During the 2019–20 legislative session, Cushing led the effort in the New Hampshire General Court to approve legislation abolishing the death penalty, including successful votes in the House and Senate to override Governor Chris Sununu's veto.

On November 19, 2020, the New Hampshire House Democrats chose Cushing to lead them during the 2021–22 legislative session of the General Court.

== Health and death ==
Cushing was diagnosed with stage four prostate cancer in 2020. He took a leave of absence as Democratic leader for health reasons on March 2, 2022, and died from the disease and complications of COVID-19 at his home in Hampton, New Hampshire, five days later, on March 7, at the age of 69. He was survived by his wife Kristie Conrad, whom he married in 1989, as well as his three daughters: Marie Ellen, Elizabeth Agnes and Grace Bridget Cushing.

New Hampshire House of Representatives
Preceded by Dick Hinch	Minority Leader of the New Hampshire House of Representatives; 2020–2022	Succeeded by David Cote
