= Robert L. Sanders =

American politician

Robert Sanders

Member of the Mississippi House of Representatives from the 29th district
- Incumbent
- Assumed office November 3, 2021
- Preceded by: Abe M. Hudson Jr.

Personal details
- Born: December 20, 1961 (age 64) Shaw, Mississippi, U.S.
- Party: Democratic
- Education: Mississippi Valley State University (BS)

Robert L. Sanders (December 20, 1961) is an American politician serving as a member of the Mississippi House of Representatives from the 29th district. He assumed office on November 3, 2021.

== Early life and education ==
Sanders was born in Shaw, Mississippi, in 1961. He earned a Bachelor of Science degree in physical education from Mississippi Valley State University.

== Career ==
Sanders served as chief of police for the Mississippi Valley State University Police Department and was an officer with the Shaw Police Department. He was also an internal affairs investigator for the Mississippi Department of Corrections. He later served as sergeant-at-arms for the Mississippi State Senate from 2000 to 2004. He was elected to the Mississippi House of Representatives in a November 2021 special election, succeeding Abe M. Hudson Jr.
