= Brian Harrison (Texas politician) =

American health official (born 1982)

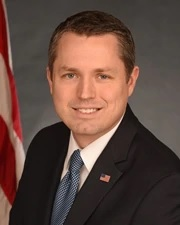

Member of the Texas House of Representatives from the 10th district
- Incumbent
- Assumed office October 12, 2021
- Preceded by: Jake Ellzey

Personal details
- Born: Brian Edward Harrison; May 19, 1982 (age 44) Midlothian, Texas, U.S.
- Party: Republican
- Spouse: Tara Napier (m. 2011)
- Children: 4
- Education: Texas A&M University (BA)

Brian Edward Harrison (born May 19, 1982) is an American government official who has represented the 10th district in the Texas House of Representatives since winning a special election for the seat in 2021. He previously served as chief of staff of the United States Department of Health and Human Services and ran for the United States House of Representatives in the 2021 special election for Texas's 6th congressional district, gaining 10.8% of the vote and placing fourth in a field of 23 candidates. The election was won by state representative Jake Ellzey. Harrison ran in and won the ensuing special election for Ellzey's state house seat on September 28, 2021.

== Education ==
A graduate of Ovilla Christian School, Harrison earned a Bachelor of Arts degree in economics from Texas A&M University.

== Career ==
From 2005 to 2009, Harrison held positions at the Department of Health and Human Services, Social Security Administration, United States Department of Defense, and Office of the Vice President of the United States during the Presidency of George W. Bush.

After leaving government service in 2009, he was the director of healthcare practice at the DCI Group, a public affairs consulting group. In 2011, he was a delegate at the annual American-German Young Leaders Conference organized by the American Council on Germany. Harrison then worked at his father's homebuilding business, Harrison Homes. From 2012 to 2018 he owned and operated a Dallas, Texas, dog-breeding business called Dallas Labradoodles.

During the Presidency of Donald Trump, Harrison was appointed deputy chief of staff in the Department of Health and Human Services (HHS) and promoted to chief of staff when his predecessor departed in June 2019. Harrison coordinated the HHS early response to the COVID-19 pandemic before those responsibilities were transferred to Robert Kadlec in February 2020. According to Harrison, he worked "closely" with Dr. Anthony Fauci and was "an integral leader of the development of Operation Warp Speed."

In February 2021, Harrison was reported to be exploring running for the special election in Texas's 6th congressional district after the death of incumbent Ron Wright. On March 1, 2021, Harrison officially declared his candidacy. Harrison came in fourth place in the special election with 10.81% of the vote.

Two months later on August 9, 2021, Harrison announced his candidacy for the Texas House of Representatives District 10 special election to replace Jake Ellzey, who vacated the district seat after winning the Texas's 6th congressional district special election, the one Harrison ran for in May. The special election was held on August 31, 2021, and Harrison placed first with 41 percent of the vote with 4,613 votes and John Wray placed second with 36 percent of the vote with 4,031 votes. Harrison and Wray would later face each other in a runoff election. The runoff was held on September 28, 2021, and Harrison defeated Wray 55.38% to 44.62%.

== Texas House of Representatives ==
On May 27, 2023, Harrison voted against impeaching Attorney General Ken Paxton. Paxton was ultimately acquitted of all charges following the trial in the state senate.

After the 88th legislative session, Harrison, in addition to others such as Texas Governor Greg Abbott, was one of the most vocal supporters of the campaign to replace ideologically opposed Republicans using the votes in the Paxton impeachment and the issue of private school vouchers as litmus tests for whether certain members were truly conservative. Ultimately 15 Republican incumbents were ousted in 2024 primary with new ideologically aligned Republicans.

During the race for Texas Speaker of the House in the lead up to the 89th legislative session Harrison supported candidate David Cook who ran on the issue of banning members of the minority party, in this case Democrats, from receiving committee chairmanships in the Texas House. Cook lost the speaker's race in the second round to Dustin Burrows.

On April 1, 2025, Harrison attempted to remove Speaker Burrows from his post by making a motion to vacate the chair. He cited the changes of House rules regarding Democrat vice-chairs on committee and an alleged prioritization of Democratic legislative policies as the reason for his motion. Burrows refused to recognize Harrison for the motion stating that the motion "must be raised by resolution". On April 8, Harrison filed the resolution and it was put before the House the next day. The subsequent debate was swiftly shut down on a vote of 141-2. Only Harrison and Rep. David Lowe voted to continue debate.

In September 2025, Harrison shared a series of videos and audio recordings online which showed discussions between a student and faculty at Texas A&M University. In one of the videos a student confronts the instructor, Dr. Melissa McCoul, about her teaching of issues related to gender identity featured in the children's book Jude Saves the World. The video sparked a pressure campaign which eventually resulted in McCoul being fired for teaching content "that did not align with any reasonable expectation of the standard curriculum". As Harrison released more recordings and other state officials like Governor Greg Abbott became involved more faculty were removed from their positions and ultimately Texas A&M University President Mark Welsh resigned.

== Electoral history ==
Texas's 6th congressional district special election, 2021
Party	Candidate	Votes	%
Republican	Susan Wright	15,021	19.21
Republican	Jake Ellzey	10,851	13.85
Democratic	Jana Sanchez	10,497	13.39
Republican	Brian Harrison	8,476	10.81
Democratic	Shawn Lassiter	6,964	8.89
Republican	John Anthony Castro	4,321	5.51
Democratic	Tammy Allison Holloway	4,238	5.41
Democratic	Lydia Bean	2,920	3.73
Republican	Michael Wood	2,503	3.19
Republican	Michael Ballantine	2,224	2.84
Republican	Dan Rodimer	2,086	2.66
Democratic	Daryl J. Eddings Sr.	1,652	2.11
Republican	Mike Egan	1,543	1.97
Democratic	Patrick Moses	1,189	1.52
Democratic	Manuel R. Salazar III	1,119	1.43
Republican	Sery Kim	888	1.13
Republican	Travis Rodermund	460	0.59
Independent	Adrian Mizher	351	0.45
Democratic	Brian K. Stephenson	271	0.35
Libertarian	Phil Gray	265	0.34
Democratic	Matthew Hinterlong	252	0.32
Republican	Jennifer Garcia Sharon	150	0.19
Democratic	Chris Suprun	102	0.13
Total votes		78,374	100.0

Texas House of Representatives 10th District special election, 2021
Party	Candidate	Votes	%
Republican	Brian Harrison	4,613	40.70
Republican	John Wray	4,031	35.57
Democratic	Pierina Otiniano	1,281	11.30
Republican	Kevin Griffin	883	7.79
Republican	Clark Wickliffe	351	3.10
Independent	Scott Goodwin	107	0.94
Republican	Susan Mellina Hayslip	37	0.33
Libertarian	Matt Savino	31	0.27
Total votes		11,426	100.0

2021 Texas House of Representatives 10th district special runoff election
Party	Candidate	Votes	%
Republican	Brian Harrison	6,717	55.38
Republican	John Wray	5,412	44.62
Total votes		11,334	100.0
Republican hold			

2022 Texas House of Representatives 10th district election (Note: In September 2022, the Texas Secretary of State declared multiple candidates who were running unopposed "elected" and as such they did not appear on the ballot.)
Primary election
Party	Candidate	Votes	%
Republican	Brian Harrison (incumbent)	13,325	100.0
Total votes		13,325	100.0
General election
Republican	Brian Harrison (incumbent)	Unopposed	
Republican hold			

2024 Texas House of Representatives 10th district election
Primary election
Party	Candidate	Votes	%
Republican	Brian Harrison (incumbent)	16,282	100.0
Total votes		16,282	100.0
General election
Republican	Brian Harrison (incumbent)	68,706	98.67
Write-in		928	1.34
Total votes		69,634	100.0
Republican hold			

== Personal life ==
Harrison was married to Tara Napier in 2011. She worked at the White House during the Bush administration in 2007 and at the Office of the Secretary of Defense from 2005 to 2011 before being hired by BP as communications manager in December 2011. She became head of corporate affairs in 2019. Harrison and Napier have four children.

Harrison's father, Ed Harrison, ran for U.S. Congress in Texas's 24th congressional district in 1994 and 1996 against Democrat Martin Frost and for state Senate against Republican Kip Averitt in 2002, losing all three. He would finally win a race in the 2020s, gaining a seat on the Midlothian Independent School District Board of Trustees.

== See also ==
- Alex Azar
