= Ronald Johnson (Alabama politician) =

American politician (1943–2020)

Ron Johnson

Member of the Alabama House of Representatives from the 33rd district
- In office January 3, 1984 – July 14, 2020
- Preceded by: Jim Bennett
- Succeeded by: Ben Robbins

Member of the Alabama House of Representatives from the 54th district
- In office November 8, 1978 – January 3, 1984
- Preceded by: Murray McClusky
- Succeeded by: George Perdue

Personal details
- Born: September 21, 1943 Bonifay, Florida, US
- Died: July 14, 2020 (aged 76) Birmingham, Alabama, US
- Party: Republican
- Profession: Pharmacist

Ronald G. Johnson (September 21, 1943 – July 14, 2020) was an American pharmacist and politician.

Johnson was born in Bonifay, Florida. Johnson received his degrees in chemistry and biology from Florida State University and in pharmacy from Auburn University. He lived in Sylacauga, Alabama and was a pharmacist. He was a member of the Alabama House of Representatives from the 33rd District, serving since 1978, which made him the chamber's most senior member. Johnson was a member of the Democratic Party until 1998, when he switched to the Republican Party. He died of liver cancer on July 14, 2020, while still in office.
