= Treneé McGee =

American politician (born 1994)

Member of the Connecticut House of Representatives from the 116th district
- Incumbent
- Assumed office December 22, 2021
- Preceded by: Michael DiMassa

Personal details
- Born: July 5, 1994 (age 32)
- Party: Democratic
- Education: Marymount Manhattan College (BFA)

Treneé McGee (born July 5, 1994) is an American Democratic politician who has served as a member of the Connecticut House of Representatives for the 116th district, which includes parts of the cities of New Haven and West Haven, since 2021. She is the youngest female member of the Connecticut House.

== Career ==
In December 2021, McGee was elected at the age of 27 in a special election following the arrest and subsequent resignation of Michael DiMassa. She is the youngest black woman ever elected to serve in the Connecticut General Assembly, and the youngest woman currently serving in the Connecticut House of Representatives.

Treneé McGee is a graduate of Marymount Manhattan College. Before being elected to the Connecticut House, she served on the West Haven City Council.

== Political views ==
McGee is an advocate of a consistent life ethic, opposing abortion, capital punishment, and euthanasia. She was one of two signatories of a letter circulated by Democrats for Life advocating for the return of the 2000 Democratic Party platform's acknowledgment of a diversity of opinion on abortion.

In 2022, McGee raised objections to House Bill 5414, signed by Governor Ned Lamont and aimed at expanding access to abortions. She opposed the bill, asserting that black people had been disproportionately targeted by an "abortion industry." In regards to abortion, McGee said that her main priority would be to implement policies to lessen the demand for abortions.

McGee says she supports "quality health care for everyone," and she believes that "students should be able to go to college and not be in debt for the rest of their lives."
