= Linda Camarota =

American politician

Member of New Hampshire House of Representatives for Hillsborough 7
- In office December 5, 2018 – December 1, 2020
- Succeeded by: Niki Kelsey

Personal details
- Party: Republican

Linda Rea Camarota is an American politician. She was elected a member of the New Hampshire House of Representatives in the 2018 election.

In 2021, she was a candidate in the District 7 special election but was narrowly defeated by Catherine Rombeau.
