= Ben Robbins (politician) =

American politician

Member of the Alabama House of Representatives from the 33rd district
- Incumbent
- Assumed office January 26, 2021
- Preceded by: Ronald Johnson

Personal details
- Born: Benjamin W. Robbins
- Party: Republican
- Spouse: Melanie Robbins
- Children: 1

Benjamin W. Robbins is an American politician from the state of Alabama. He currently serves as a Republican member of the Alabama House of Representatives, representing District 33, including parts of Coosa, Talladega, and Clay County.

== Education ==
Robbins is a seventh-generation Alabama native and a grandson of former Childersburg Mayor Robert Limbaugh. Robbins began his secondary education at Talladega High School in 1997, graduating in 2001. Robbins earned a Bachelor of Arts degree in history from Samford University in 2005, followed by a Master of Arts in Modern American History from Mississippi State University in 2009. He then obtained a Juris Doctor degree from St. Thomas University Law School in 2012.

== Career ==
Robbins was a legislative correspondent for Republican US Senator from Alabama Richard Shelby from 2007 to 2008. In 2014, he started his own law firm in Sylacauga, Robbins & Robbins, Attorneys At Law. He served in many community leadership roles within Sylacauga, including co-president of Leadership Sylacauga and Talladega Rotary Club past-president. Robbins took on his first electoral challenge when, on September 25, 2017, he announced his candidacy for the Republican nomination for Alabama House District 33 against incumbent Representative Ronald Johnson. Robbins lost the primary election on June 5, 2018, earning 48.3% of the vote to Johnson's 51.7%. After Johnson's death on July 14, 2020, a special election to fill the vacant seat was scheduled for January 19, 2021. Robbins passed through the Republican primary unopposed and faced Democrat Fred Crum. On January 19, 2021, Robbins defeated his Crum, 68.2% to 31.7%. Robbins took office on January 26, 2021, as State Representative for Alabama House District 33.

=== Committee positions ===
Robbins is a member of the Judiciary Committee and a member of the Boards, Agencies, and Commissions Committee.

== Elections ==
=== Alabama House of Representatives District 33 ===
==== 2018 Republican Primary ====
2018 Republican Primary
Party	Candidate	Votes	%
Republican	Ronald Johnson	3,256	51.7%
Republican	Ben Robbins	3,045	48.3%
Total votes		6,301	100.0%

==== 2021 Special Election ====
2021 Special Election
Party	Candidate	Votes	%
Republican	Ben Robbins	2,232	68.2%
Democratic	Fred Crum	1,037	31.7%
Write-in		4	0.1%
Total votes		3,273	100.0%
