= David Cote (politician) =

American politician

Minority Leader of the New Hampshire House of Representatives
- In office March 2, 2022 – December 7, 2022; Acting: March 2, 2022 – March 25, 2022
- Preceded by: Renny Cushing
- Succeeded by: Matthew Wilhelm

Member of the New Hampshire House of Representatives
- In office December 1, 1990 – July 5, 2023
- Constituency: Hillsborough 3rd (2022–2023); 31st (2012–2022); 23rd (2004–2012); 62nd (2002–2004); 29th (1992–2002); 25th (1990–1992)
- In office December 1, 1982 – December 1, 1988
- Constituency: Hillsborough 25th (1984–1988); 27th (1982–1984)

Personal details
- Born: October 28, 1960 (age 65) Nashua, New Hampshire, U.S.
- Party: Democratic

David E. Cote (born October 28, 1960) is an American politician from New Hampshire. He is a former member of the New Hampshire House of Representatives, a Democrat, he represented the Hillsborough 3 district, having been first elected in 1982 and serving until his resignation in 2023. Cote served as House Democratic Leader, and had served as chair and ranking member on the Election Law and Judiciary committees, as well as ranking member of the Redistricting Committee in 2021-2022. As of early 2022, he had not cast a floor vote or attended an in-person House session since March 11, 2020 due to COVID health concerns. On July 5, 2023, Cote resigned after the New Hampshire House refused to allow remote participation.

New Hampshire House of Representatives
Preceded by Renny Cushing	Minority Leader of the New Hampshire House of Representatives; 2022	Succeeded by Matthew Wilhelm
