= Michael DiMassa =

American politician (born 1990)

Member of the Connecticut House of Representatives from the 116th district
- In office January 4, 2017 – October 25, 2021
- Preceded by: Louis Esposito
- Succeeded by: Treneé McGee

Personal details
- Born: September 17, 1990 (age 35)
- Party: Democratic

Michael DiMassa (born September 17, 1990) is an American politician who served in the Connecticut House of Representatives from the 116th district from 2017 to 2021.

On October 20, 2021, he was arrested and charged with stealing $600,000 in COVID relief funds. He resigned from the Connecticut House of Representatives on October 25, 2021. At trial he was accused of stealing $636,000 of COVID funds from the city, which he used for gambling and personal expenses. He was found guilty, resigned his state seat and was sentenced to two years in jail with five years supervision and ordered to repay the money.
