= David Danielson =

American politician (1947–2021)

Dave Danielson

Member of the New Hampshire House of Representatives from the Hillsborough 7th district
- In office December 2012 – May 22, 2021
- Preceded by: multi-member district
- Succeeded by: Catherine Rombeau

Personal details
- Born: March 17, 1947 Manchester, New Hampshire, U.S.
- Died: May 22, 2021 (aged 74) Bedford, New Hampshire, U.S.
- Party: Republican
- Education: Saint Anselm College, Rivier University

David J. Danielson (March 17, 1947 – May 22, 2021) was an American politician. First elected in 2012, he was a Republican member of the New Hampshire House of Representatives, representing the town of Bedford. In 2017, he was designated the assistant majority leader.

Danielson was born in Manchester, New Hampshire on March 17, 1947. He graduated from Bishop Bradley High School in 1965. Danielson earned his bachelor's degree in political science from Saint Anselm College, and a Master of Business Administration from Rivier University.

Danielson served in the New Hampshire Army National Guard, and as an adjunct faculty member at Southern New Hampshire University.

Danielson and his wife Mary had one son. He died on May 22, 2021, of cancer at his home in Bedford, New Hampshire.
