= Bert Reeves =

American politician

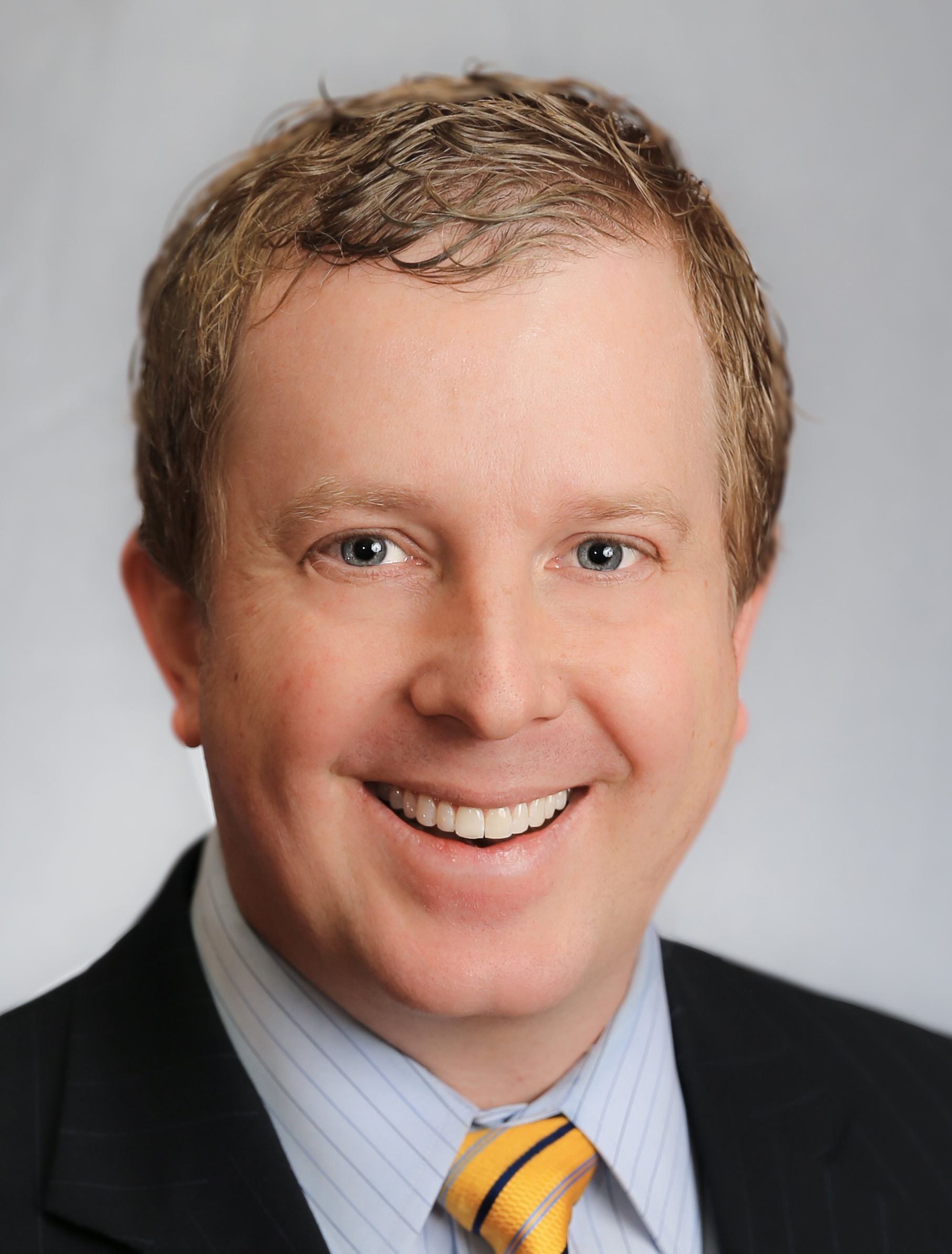

Member of the Georgia House of Representatives from the 34th district
- In office January 12, 2015 – April 30, 2021
- Preceded by: Charles Gregory
- Succeeded by: Devan Seabaugh

Personal details
- Born: December 9, 1976 (age 49) Kennesaw, Georgia, U.S.
- Party: Republican

Albert Thomas Reeves Jr. (born December 9, 1976) is an American politician who has served in the Georgia House of Representatives from the 34th district since 2015. He resigned from office at the end of April 2021 to become Georgia Tech's Vice President for Institute Relations, with Devan Seabaugh winning the special election to replace him.
