= Devan Seabaugh =

American politician

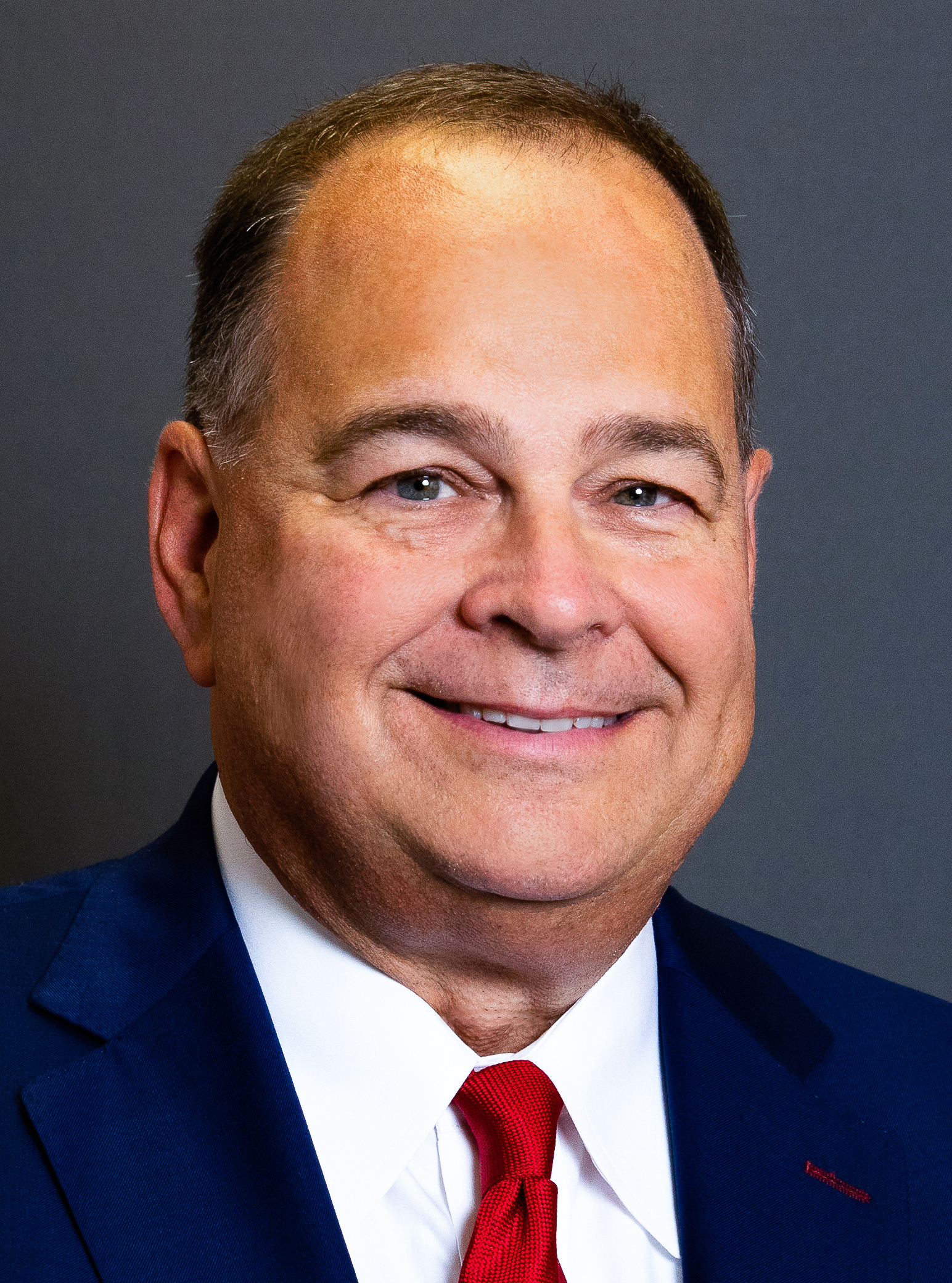

Member of the Georgia House of Representatives from the 34th district
- Incumbent
- Assumed office July 21, 2021
- Preceded by: Bert Reeves

Personal details
- Born: Devan Lee Seabaugh; June 27, 1965 (age 61)
- Party: Republican

Devan Lee Seabaugh (born June 27, 1965) is an ambulance company executive who has been serving in the Georgia House of Representatives since 2021, representing the 34th district. He is a member of the Republican Party.

== Political career ==
Seabaugh was elected in a special election to represent the 34th district following the resignation of incumbent Bert Reeves on April 30, 2021, to work for Georgia Tech.

Seabaugh ran for reelection in the 2022 Georgia House of Representatives election. He was uncontested in the Republican primary, and won the general election against Democratic candidate Dorothy Coker. Seabaugh was again uncontested in the primary in 2024, and won the general election against Democrat Karl Gallegos.

Seabaugh is running for reelection in 2026. He won renomination uncontested, and will face Democrat Titus Nichols in the general election.

== Electoral history ==
2021 Georgia House of Representatives 34th district special election
Party	Candidate	Votes	%
Republican	Devan Seabaugh	3,337	47.1%
Democratic	Priscilla Smith	1,740	24.6%
Democratic	Sam Hensley Jr.	1,116	15.7%
Republican	David Blinkhorn	839	11.8%
Libertarian	Chris Neill	54	0.8%
Total votes		7,086	100%

2021 Georgia House of Representatives 34th district special runoff election
Party	Candidate	Votes	%
Republican	Devan Seabaugh	5,604	63.0%
Democratic	Priscilla Smith	3,296	37.0%
Total votes		8,900	100%
Republican hold			

2022 Georgia House of Representatives 34th district Republican primary election
Party	Candidate	Votes	%
Republican	Devan Seabaugh (incumbent)	11,143	100.0%
Total votes		11,143	100.0%

2022 Georgia House of Representatives 34th district election
Party	Candidate	Votes	%
Republican	Devan Seabaugh (incumbent)	19,155	62.19%
Democratic	Dorothy Coker	11,645	37.81%
Total votes		30,800	100.0%
Republican hold			

2024 Georgia House of Representatives 34th district Republican primary election
Party	Candidate	Votes	%
Republican	Devan Seabaugh (incumbent)	4,252	100.0%
Total votes		4,252	100.0%

2024 Georgia House of Representatives 34th district election
Party	Candidate	Votes	%
Republican	Devan Seabaugh (incumbent)	21,849	57.65%
Democratic	Karl Gallegos	16,053	42.35%
Total votes		37,902	100.0%
Republican hold			

2026 Georgia House of Representatives 34th district Republican primary election
Party	Candidate	Votes	%
Republican	Devan Seabaugh (incumbent)	7,738	100.0%
Total votes		7,738	100.0%
