= Jason Osborne (politician) =

American politician (born 1977)

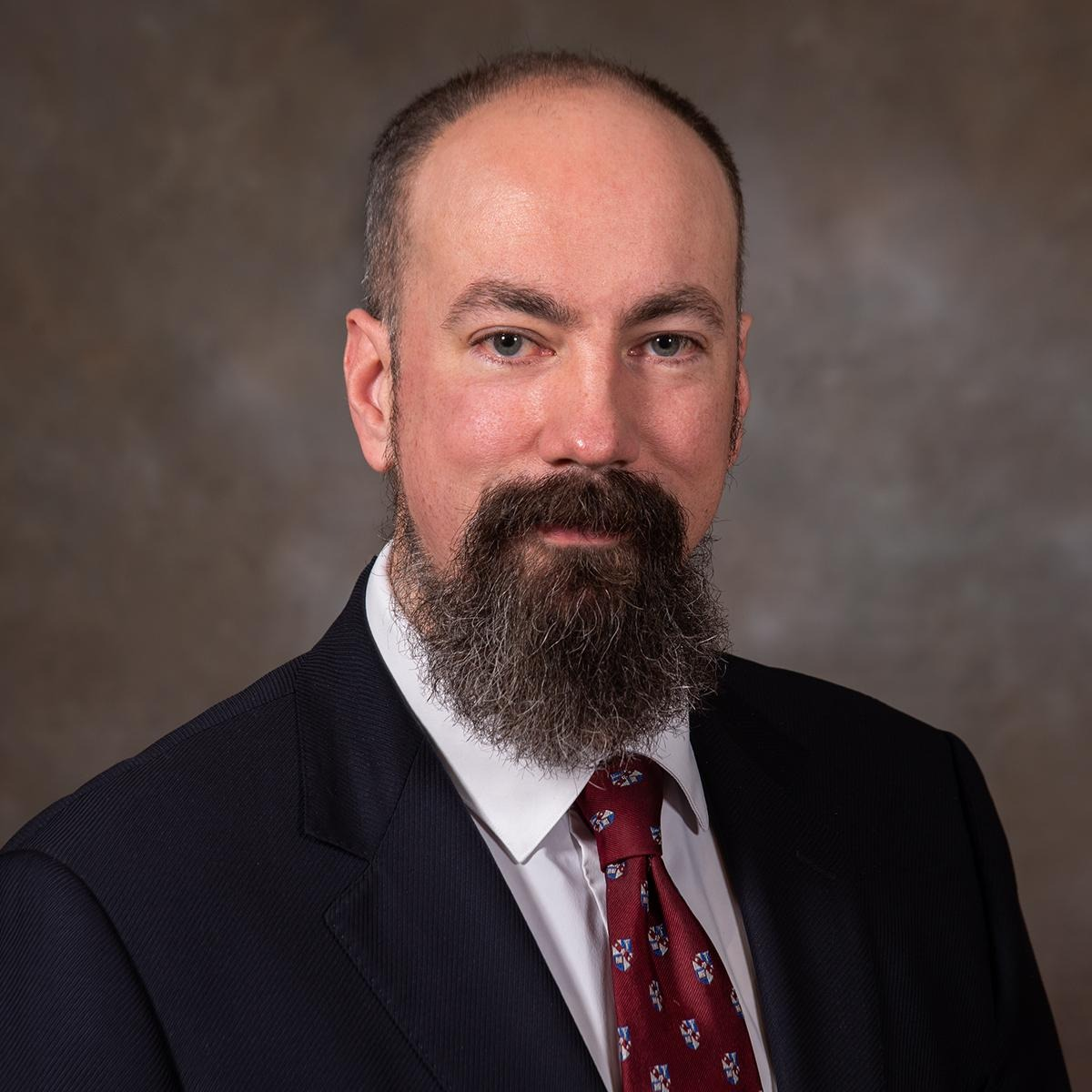
- Osborne in 2023

Majority Leader of the New Hampshire House of Representatives
- Incumbent
- Assumed office December 2, 2020
- Preceded by: Douglas Ley

Member of the New Hampshire House of Representatives from the Rockingham 2nd district
- Incumbent
- Assumed office December 3, 2014
- Preceded by: Gene Charron; Stella Tremblay; Dan Dumaine

Personal details
- Born: June 15, 1977 (age 49)
- Party: Republican
- Education: Hillsdale College (BA)

Jason M. Osborne (born June 15, 1977) is an American politician serving as Majority Leader of the New Hampshire House of Representatives. A Republican, he has represented Rockingham 2, comprising Auburn, Candia, and Deerfield, since 2014.

Osborne moved to New Hampshire from Ohio in 2010 as part of the Free State Project and was first elected to the House in 2014. He served as House Republican Policy Leader from 2018 to 2020, and in November 2020 the Republican caucus chose him as Majority Leader. During the 2025 and 2026 sessions he co-sponsored 31 bills enacted into law, among them HB 302, which made New Hampshire the first state to establish a strategic bitcoin reserve.

Osborne's family debt collection business, later renamed Mammoth Tech Inc., closed in 2022 and was the subject of litigation over its handling of layoffs. In June 2026 he announced a candidacy for Speaker of the New Hampshire House for the term beginning after the 2026 elections.

== Biography ==
Osborne moved to New Hampshire from Defiance, Ohio, where his family founded Credit Adjustments, Inc. (CAI), a debt collections company, in 1964. Osborne joined the family firm in 1995 and worked as the CIO, and later CEO. Osborne graduated from Hillsdale College in Michigan with degrees in economics and mathematics. He subsequently studied for a doctorate in economics before leaving academia for business.

Osborne's 2010 move to New Hampshire was made as part of the Free State Project. He has said he signed the Free State Project pledge while in college.

== Business and legal issues ==
In 2022, reporting by New Hampshire Public Radio and the New Hampshire Business Review detailed the decline of Mammoth Tech Inc., a company with which Osborne was associated as a director. The company, formerly known as Credit Adjustments Inc., had received more than $4 million in Paycheck Protection Program (PPP) loans during the COVID-19 pandemic. In March 2022, Mammoth Tech closed its operations, laying off all remaining employees in New Hampshire and additional employees in Ohio. The closures occurred without advance notice to employees, even as the company had received federal funding intended to retain staff.

Following the layoffs, Mammoth Tech faced multiple legal and financial challenges, including a class-action lawsuit alleging failure to provide required notice to employees, a lawsuit from its landlord over unpaid rent, financial judgments related to contractual disputes, and disability discrimination claims from former employees. Some former employees reported long hours and disputed pay and benefits following the closures. Former pregnant employees have reportedly filed two disability discrimination suits, one settled and one ongoing.

In October 2025, the New Hampshire Attorney General’s Office issued several cease-and-desist orders and civil penalties related to campaign finance reporting requirements. As part of the enforcement actions, Jason Osborne, then House Majority Leader, and the political committee he chairs, Friends of Jason Osborne, were cited for failing to file required campaign finance reports in a timely manner for both the 2022 and 2024 election cycles. Osborne was ordered to pay $2,000 in civil penalties for the late filings, and instructed to comply with state campaign finance laws. The actions stemmed from notices sent by the Attorney General’s Election Law Unit, which found Osborne’s committee’s reports were significantly overdue and that required itemized receipts and expenditures had not been filed on schedule.

== Political career ==
Osborne is a Republican. He served as House Republican Policy Leader from 2018 to 2020 before the caucus elected him Majority Leader in November 2020. As New Hampshire House Majority Leader, Osborne has been credited with achieving conservative legislative victories despite the Republican caucus's slim majority.

Osborne serves on the House Commerce and Consumer Affairs Committee and the House Rules Committee.

During the 2025 and 2026 sessions, Osborne was a co-sponsor of 31 bills that were enacted into law. These included HB 302 (2025), which authorized the state treasury to invest in precious metals and digital assets; HB 10 (2025), which established a parental bill of rights; and HB 1268 (2026), which modified the structure and administration of home education programs.

In June 2026, Osborne announced that he would seek election as Speaker of the New Hampshire House of Representatives for the legislative term beginning after the 2026 elections. His candidacy followed Speaker Sherman Packard’s announcement that he would not seek another term as speaker. Osborne said his campaign would focus on expanding the Republican majority and advancing priorities including tax reductions, school choice, parental rights, and Second Amendment protections. He is one of several Republican candidates seeking the speakership.

== Political positions ==
=== Abortion ===
In 2017, Osborne voted for SB 66, which authorizes murder charges for an individual who causes the death of a fetus. In 2021, he voted for HB 625, which prohibits abortions after 24 weeks. He has also voted to repeal New Hampshire buffer zone law and against requiring insurance plans that cover maternity benefits to include coverage for emergency or elective abortion services.

=== Firearms ===
In June 2022, Osborne proposed that firearms training be taught at every grade level in public schools. He also described efforts to pass gun safety measures at the federal level as "fruity ideas."

=== Taxation ===
Osborne opposes the adoption of a broad-based income or sales tax in New Hampshire, a position he frames in terms of what he calls the "New Hampshire Advantage". In 2026 he backed a constitutional amendment that would have barred the legislature from enacting an income tax, which he called the "New Hampshire Advantage Amendment". The measure failed on the House floor in March 2026 by a vote of 194–158, short of the three-fifths majority required to advance a constitutional amendment.

=== Digital assets ===
Osborne supported HB 302 (2025), which authorized the state treasurer to invest up to 5 percent of certain public funds in precious metals and in digital assets with a market capitalization above $500 billion, a threshold met at the time only by bitcoin. Governor Kelly Ayotte signed the bill on May 6, 2025, making New Hampshire the first state to establish a strategic bitcoin reserve. The bill's prime sponsor was Representative Keith Ammon; Osborne, as Majority Leader, helped move it through the House.

=== Education ===
Osborne is a supporter of New Hampshire's Education Freedom Accounts, a publicly funded program that allows families to spend state education money on private school tuition, homeschooling materials, tutoring, and other expenses, and has been described as one of the program's leading legislative advocates. He has said the program "reinforces parents' rights" and has pushed to broaden eligibility for it.

=== Housing ===
Osborne has supported changes to municipal land use regulation intended to increase housing supply. He co-sponsored HB 399 (2025), which established a commission to study the state's zoning enabling act, and voted for measures limiting municipal parking requirements and restricting planning boards from regulating residential development on the basis of bedroom count.

=== Marijuana legalization ===
Osborne argued for the legalization of cannabis in New Hampshire in a 2023 op-ed titled "Conservative case for cannabis reform".

== Personal life ==
Osborne lives in Auburn with his wife, Sharon, who founded Latitude Learning Resources, a nonprofit homeschool resource center in Derry offering cross-curricular classes for homeschoolers and other students, and serves as its chair and director. As of 2022, the couple's children did not attend public school.

== 2022 online forum posts ==
In 2022, archived online forum posts from Osborne dating between 2007 and 2011 resurfaced. In the posts, Osborne used a racial slur and made remarks that were widely criticized as sexist, including comments about women breastfeeding. Some of the posts also included language suggesting he opposed age-of-consent laws. The resurfacing of these posts drew public criticism and coverage in local media. Osborne later expressed regret for the language in some of the resurfaced posts.

== Electoral history ==
Osborne represented Rockingham District 4 from 2014 until the 2022 redistricting, after which his towns were renumbered as Rockingham District 2.

2024 Rockingham District 2 General Election
| Party | Candidate | Votes | % |
|---|---|---|---|
| Republican | Jason Osborne (incumbent) | 5,792 | 21.4 |
| Republican | James Spillane (incumbent) | 5,435 | 20.0 |
| Republican | Kevin Verville (incumbent) | 5,399 | 19.9 |
| Democratic | Kendra Cohen | 3,594 | 13.3 |
| Democratic | Judith Lindsey | 3,569 | 13.2 |
| Democratic | Nick Karakoudas | 3,326 | 12.3 |
| Total votes | | 27,115 | 100 |
| Republican hold | | | |
| Republican hold | | | |
| Republican hold | | | |

2022 Rockingham District 2 General Election
| Party | Candidate | Votes | % |
|---|---|---|---|
| Republican | Jason Osborne (incumbent) | 4,425 | 20.5 |
| Republican | Kevin Verville (incumbent) | 4,251 | 19.7 |
| Republican | James Spillane (incumbent) | 4,193 | 19.4 |
| Democratic | Messier | 3,064 | 14.2 |
| Democratic | Wood | 2,924 | 13.5 |
| Democratic | Power | 2,732 | 12.7 |
| Total votes | | 21,589 | 100 |
| Republican hold | | | |
| Republican hold | | | |
| Republican hold | | | |

2020 Rockingham District 4 General Election
| Party | Candidate | Votes | % |
|---|---|---|---|
| Republican | Jess Edwards (incumbent) | 6,686 | 14 |
| Republican | Chris True (incumbent) | 6,330 | 13.3 |
| Republican | Jason Osborne (incumbent) | 6,235 | 13.1 |
| Republican | Tony Piemonte (incumbent) | 5,982 | 12.5 |
| Republican | Oliver Ford | 5,966 | 12.5 |
| Democratic | Michael D'Angelo | 3,533 | 7.4 |
| Democratic | Jane Van Zandt | 3,441 | 7.4 |
| Democratic | Matthew Krohn | 3,178 | 6.7 |
| Democratic | Ben Geiger | 3,162 | 6.6 |
| Democratic | Russell Normal | 3,158 | 6.6 |
| Total votes | | 47,676 | 100 |
| Republican hold | | | |
| Republican hold | | | |
| Republican hold | | | |
| Republican hold | | | |
| Republican hold | | | |

2018 Rockingham District 4 General Election
| Party | Candidate | Votes | % |
|---|---|---|---|
| Republican | Chris True (incumbent) | 4,416 | 12.6 |
| Republican | Jess Edwards (incumbent) | 4,371 | 12.5 |
| Republican | Becky Owens | 4,236 | 12.1 |
| Republican | Jason Osborne (incumbent) | 4,093 | 11.7 |
| Republican | Tony Piemonte | 3,948 | 11.3 |
| Democratic | Cynthia Herman | 2,934 | 8.4 |
| Democratic | Todd Bedard | 2,834 | 8.1 |
| Democratic | Patrick McLaughlin | 2,784 | 8.0 |
| Democratic | Stephen D'Angelo | 2,698 | 7.7 |
| Democratic | Benjamin Geiger | 2,622 | 7.5 |
| Total votes | | 34,940 | 100 |
| Republican hold | | | |
| Republican hold | | | |
| Republican hold | | | |
| Republican hold | | | |
| Republican hold | | | |

New Hampshire House of Representatives
| Preceded by Douglas Ley | Majority Leader of the New Hampshire House of Representatives; 2020–present | Incumbent |
