= Dick Hinch =

American politician (1949–2020)

Speaker of the New Hampshire House of Representatives
- In office December 2, 2020 – December 9, 2020
- Deputy: Sherman Packard
- Preceded by: Steve Shurtleff
- Succeeded by: Sherman Packard

Minority Leader of the New Hampshire House of Representatives
- In office December 5, 2018 – December 2, 2020
- Deputy: Sherman Packard
- Preceded by: Steve Shurtleff
- Succeeded by: Renny Cushing

Majority Leader of the New Hampshire House of Representatives
- In office November 5, 2015 – December 5, 2018
- Preceded by: Jack Flanagan
- Succeeded by: Douglas Ley

Member of the New Hampshire House of Representatives from the Hillsborough 21st district
- In office December 2008 – December 9, 2020
- Preceded by: Richard Barry; Maureen Mooney
- Succeeded by: William Boyd III

Personal details
- Born: May 1, 1949 Marblehead, Massachusetts, U.S.
- Died: December 9, 2020 (aged 71) Merrimack, New Hampshire, U.S.
- Party: Republican
- Children: 2
- Education: Salem State University (BA)

Military service
- Allegiance: United States
- Branch/service: United States Navy
- Years of service: 1968–1972

Richard W. Hinch (May 1, 1949 – December 9, 2020) was an American politician. A Republican, he was a member of the New Hampshire House of Representatives from 2008 until his death in 2020. He was speaker of the New Hampshire House of Representatives for a single week before he died from COVID-19.

== Early life and education ==
Hinch was born in Marblehead, Massachusetts, and served in the United States Navy from 1968 to 1972. He graduated from Marblehead High School and Salem State University.

== Career ==
Hinch was involved in the real estate business in Merrimack, New Hampshire. He was elected to the New Hampshire House of Representatives, in 2008, representing the Hillsborough 21 district. From 2015 to 2018, he served as the majority leader of the House, and from 2018 to 2020, he served as minority leader.

Hinch opposed paid family leave legislation in 2019. He supported school choice legislation that would give parents $3,000 for either private school tuition or homeschooling.

During the 2020 COVID-19 pandemic, Hinch supported Republican representatives who refused to wear face coverings on the House floor, referring to this faction as the "patriot section" and "freedom group." On November 20, 2020, Republican House members gathered at McIntyre Ski Area, where they nominated Hinch to become the next House speaker. (In the 2020 election, Hinch won election to a seventh two-year term, and Republicans regained control of the state legislature, taking majorities in both chambers from the Democrats.) The indoor meeting was followed by an outbreak of COVID-19 among Republican lawmakers. Several of them tested positive for the COVID-19 virus after the conference and before the opening session of New Hampshire's legislature. The outbreak caused a controversy, as Democratic state lawmakers said that they were not informed of the outbreak, while Republicans were informed. Hinch publicly downplayed the outbreak, saying that only a "small number" were infected.

On December 2, 2020, Hinch was formally elected and sworn in as speaker at an outside gathering on the University of New Hampshire campus.

== Death ==
Hinch died from COVID-19 at his home on December 9, 2020, during the COVID-19 pandemic in New Hampshire. He was 71.

It was unclear how Hinch acquired the virus, but Republican state Representative William M. Marsh blamed the death of his colleague on "peer pressure" from a group of Republican legislators in New Hampshire who refused to follow public health guidelines to prevent the virus's spread, such as social distancing and wearing face coverings. Hinch was succeeded as speaker by his deputy, Sherman Packard.

New Hampshire House of Representatives
Preceded by Jack Flanagan	Majority Leader of the New Hampshire House of Representatives; 2015–2018	Succeeded by Douglas Ley
Preceded by Steve Shurtleff	Minority Leader of the New Hampshire House of Representatives; 2018–2020	Succeeded by Renny Cushing
Political offices
Preceded by Steve Shurtleff	Speaker of the New Hampshire House of Representatives; 2020	Succeeded by Sherman Packard
