= 2021 United States elections =

- ← 2019 2020 2021 2022 2023 → Off-year elections
- Election day: November 2

House elections
- Seats contested: 6 early-term vacancies
- Net seat change: 0
- Democratic hold Republican hold No election

Gubernatorial elections
- Seats contested: 3 (including a recall election in California)
- Net seat change: Republican +1
- Democratic hold Republican gain No election

Elections were held in the United States in large part on November 2, 2021. This off-year election included the regular gubernatorial elections in New Jersey and Virginia. In addition, state legislative elections were held for the New Jersey Legislature and Virginia House of Delegates (the lower house of the Virginia General Assembly), along with numerous state legislative special elections, citizen initiatives, mayoral races, and a variety of other local elections. Six special elections to the United States House of Representatives also took place on November 2 or earlier as a result of either deaths or vacancies. The first of these was held on March 20.

Republican candidates made significant gains up and down the ballot. Glenn Youngkin, the Republican nominee in the Virginia gubernatorial election, prevailed against Democratic nominee Terry McAuliffe in an upset. Youngkin promised to ban the teaching of critical race theory within public schools on day one of his administration, push back against certain COVID-19 mandates and restrictions, and advocate for a low tax and small government agenda within the state of Virginia. Within the factions in the Democratic Party, moderate nominees generally prevailed against left-wing candidates, and progressive policies by and large saw rejection; a proposal to defund and replace the Minneapolis Police Department was defeated. The 2021 election results were largely speculated as a prelude to an incoming red wave in the 2022 midterms, but large Republican gains ultimately failed to manifest in that election.

The results were interpreted by some political commentators as a backlash against the policies of the Biden administration, or cultural liberalism and wokeism within the party. Others saw Democrats' perceived failure to enact their legislative agenda in the United States Congress as the main impetus behind Republican victories, interpreting Democratic losses as public frustration at the Biden administration not following through on its promises to implement transformative policy.

== Federal elections ==
=== Senate ===
As part of the 2020 United States Senate elections, Georgia held run-off elections for both of its Senate seats on January 5, 2021. The run-off elections were triggered because of a Georgia law requiring a second round when no individual wins a majority of the vote in most federal, state, and local elections. (Note: Georgia's run-off law applies to all races except for presidential elections.) Democrats Jon Ossoff and Raphael Warnock were the victors in those special elections, which gave the Democrats a total of 48 seats to the Republicans' 50. However, the victories resulted in a shift of power to the Democrats; the other two senators, Bernie Sanders of Vermont and Angus King of Maine, are both independents who belong to the Democrats' caucus, and since any tied vote is broken by the President of the Senate—in this case Vice President Kamala Harris, also a Democrat—the Democrats technically hold a one-seat majority.

=== House of Representatives ===
Six special elections were held throughout 2021 to fill vacancies during the 117th U.S. Congress.

- Louisiana's 5th congressional district: Republican Julia Letlow defeated Democrat Sandra Christophe and fellow Republican Chad Conerly to succeed her husband Luke Letlow after his death from COVID-19 on December 29, 2020, five days before he would have taken office for the next session of Congress. The district has a partisan index of R+17.
- Louisiana's 2nd congressional district: Democrat Troy Carter defeated fellow Democrat Karen Carter Peterson to succeed Cedric Richmond, who resigned on January 15, 2021, to become the director of the Office of Public Liaison and a Senior Advisor to Joe Biden. The district has a partisan index of D+25.
- New Mexico's 1st congressional district: Democrat Melanie Stansbury defeated Republican Mark Moores to succeed Deb Haaland, who resigned on March 16, 2021, to serve as the United States Secretary of the Interior. The district has a partisan index of D+9.
- Texas's 6th congressional district: Republican Jake Ellzey defeated fellow Republican Susan Wright to succeed Ron Wright, who died on February 7, 2021, from COVID-19 during the pandemic in Texas. The district has a partisan index of R+6.
- Ohio's 11th congressional district: Democrat Shontel Brown defeated Republican Laverne Gore to succeed Marcia Fudge, who resigned on March 10, 2021, to serve as United States Secretary of Housing and Urban Development. The district has a partisan index of D+30.
- Ohio's 15th congressional district: Republican Mike Carey defeated Democrat Allison Russo to succeed Steve Stivers, who resigned on May 16, 2021, to become the president and CEO of the Ohio Chamber of Commerce. The district has a partisan index of R+9.

=== Puerto Rican shadow delegation ===
In May, Puerto Rico held a shadow congressional delegation election to elect two senators and four representatives to replace the shadow delegation first appointed in 2017. The shadow senators and representatives are not seated in Congress, but are charged with advancing Puerto Rico's statehood efforts. In the preliminary results from election night, former at-large senator Melinda Romero and lawyer Zoraida Buxo earned the most votes for senator, and conservative commentator Elizabeth Torres, municipal lawmaker Roberto Lefranc Fortuño, former Ponce Mayor María Meléndez, and Juventud PNP director Adriel Vélez earned the most votes for the House delegation. However, former governor Ricardo Rosselló earned enough write-in votes to gain a seat in the House delegation over Vélez. Voter turnout was at a record low level — 3.92% — in the election.

== State elections ==
=== Gubernatorial ===
Two states held regularly scheduled gubernatorial elections in 2021, and one more state held a recall election:

- California: A recall petition was launched against first-term Governor Gavin Newsom, a Democrat, mainly for his handling of the COVID-19 pandemic. Lieutenant Governor Eleni Kounalakis scheduled the recall election for September 14, 2021; voters began receiving their mail ballots in August. The election featured two questions: whether to recall Newsom, and who would replace him if he were recalled. A large number of candidates were listed on the replacement ballot, with major candidates including talk show host Larry Elder, financial analyst Kevin Paffrath, businessman John H. Cox, former mayor of San Diego Kevin Faulconer, state assemblyman Kevin Kiley, media personality Caitlyn Jenner, and former U.S. Representative Doug Ose, among others. The recall was unsuccessful and Newsom stayed in office.
- New Jersey: One-term Democratic governor Phil Murphy was eligible for re-election, and sought a second term. Former state assemblyman Jack Ciattarelli won the Republican primary. The Libertarian Party nominated Gregg Mele, the Green Party Madelyn Hoffman, and the Socialist Workers Party Joanne Kuniansky. Major media sources, including the Associated Press projected that Murphy has won re-election.
- Virginia: Virginia's term limit laws do not allow sitting governors to serve consecutive terms, so incumbent Democratic governor Ralph Northam is precluded from running again for the office until the next gubernatorial election in 2025. Former governor Terry McAuliffe won the Democratic primary and former co-CEO of The Carlyle Group Glenn Youngkin was nominated at the Republican convention. Liberation Party candidate Princess Blanding ran unsuccessfully in the race as well. Major media sources, including DDHQ projected the Republican nominee Glenn Youngkin to have won the election.

=== Lieutenant gubernatorial ===
One state held a lieutenant gubernatorial election in 2021:

- Virginia: One-term Democratic lieutenant governor Justin Fairfax was eligible to run for a second term, but instead ran unsuccessfully for governor. State delegate Hala Ayala won the Democratic primary and former state delegate Winsome Sears was nominated at the Republican convention. On November 2, 2021, Republican candidate Sears prevailed and was elected lieutenant governor of Virginia.

=== Attorney general ===
One state held an attorney general election in 2021:

- Virginia: Two-term Democratic attorney general Mark Herring initially ran for governor but withdrew to run for a third term. He defeated state delegate Jay Jones in the Democratic primary. State delegate Jason Miyares was nominated at the Republican convention. On November 3, Miyares defeated Herring, and became the next attorney general of Virginia.

=== Legislative ===
Legislative elections were held for both houses of the New Jersey Legislature and the lower house of the Virginia General Assembly. Democrats maintained majority control of the New Jersey Senate and the General Assembly. Republicans regained control of the Virginia House of Delegates, which had been held by Democrats since 2019.

=== Judicial ===
- Pennsylvania: Republican Kevin Brobson held an open-seat for Republicans.

=== Ballot measures ===
39 ballot measures were voted on across 9 states.

== Local elections ==
=== Mayoral elections ===
Since the beginning of 2021, various major cities have seen incumbent mayors re-elected, including Birmingham (Randall Woodfin) and Mobile, Alabama (Sandy Stimpson); Miami (Francis Suarez) and North Miami, Florida (Philippe Bien-Aime); New Orleans, Louisiana (LaToya Cantrell); Detroit (Mike Duggan) and Lansing, Michigan (Andy Schor); Minneapolis (Jacob Frey) and St. Paul, Minnesota (Melvin Carter); Jackson, Mississippi (Chokwe Antar Lumumba); Springfield, Missouri (Ken McClure); Omaha, Nebraska (Jean Stothert); Manchester, New Hampshire (Joyce Craig); Jersey City, New Jersey (Steven Fulop); Albuquerque, New Mexico (Tim Keller); Buffalo (Byron Brown) and Syracuse, New York (Ben Walsh); Toledo, Ohio (Wade Kapszukiewicz); Lancaster, Pennsylvania (Danene Sorace); San Antonio, Texas (Ron Nirenberg); Burlington, Vermont (Miro Weinberger); and Alexandria, Virginia (Justin Wilson).

Open mayoral seats were won in Anchorage, Alaska (Dave Bronson); St. Petersburg, Florida (Ken Welch); Atlanta, Georgia (Andre Dickens); St. Louis, Missouri (Tishaura Jones); New York City (Eric Adams); Durham, North Carolina (Elaine O'Neal); Cincinnati (Aftab Pureval) and Cleveland, Ohio (Justin Bibb); Chattanooga, Tennessee (Tim Kelly); Arlington (Jim Ross), Fort Worth (Mattie Parker) and Plano, Texas (John Muns); and Seattle, Washington (Bruce Harrell).

In Kansas City, Kansas, former KCKPD deputy chief Tyrone Garner narrowly defeated incumbent David Alvey in a runoff election. In Boston, Massachusetts, city councilwoman Michelle Wu was elected to succeed acting mayor Kim Janey, who came in fourth in the blanket primary. Janey was appointed to replace Marty Walsh, who resigned on March 22, 2021, to become the United States Secretary of Labor. In Rochester, New York, city councilman Malik Evans ran unopposed after defeating incumbent two-term Lovely Warren in the primary election. In Allentown, Pennsylvania, businessman Matthew Tuerk was elected to replace incumbent Ray O'Connell, who lost renomination in the Democratic primary. In Harrisburg, Pennsylvania, two-term incumbent Eric Papenfuse ran a write-in campaign after losing nomination to city council president Wanda Williams, who ultimately won the general election. In Pittsburgh, Pennsylvania, state representative Ed Gainey was elected to replace two-term incumbent Bill Peduto, who lost renomination in the Democratic primary. In Cedar Rapids, Iowa, Republican Tiffany O'Donnell was elected after incumbent Republican Brad Hart failed to advance to the runoff.

=== Other municipal elections ===
- Boston, Massachusetts: City Council
- Cleveland, Ohio: City Council
- Dallas, Texas: City Council
- Minneapolis, Minnesota: City Council
- New York, New York: Comptroller, Public Advocate, City Council, borough presidents
- Seattle, Washington: City Attorney, City Council
- Worcester, Massachusetts: Mayor, City Council, and School Committee

== Tribal elections ==
Several notable Native American tribes held elections in 2021 for tribal executives, including the Aroostook Band of Micmacs, Citizen Potawatomi Nation, Confederated Tribes of Siletz Indians, Mashpee Wampanoag Tribe, and the Nisqually Indian Tribe. Tim Nuvangyaoma was reelected as chairman of the Hopi Tribe.

The Lumbee Tribe of North Carolina elected John Lowery as chairman. In the Rosebud Sioux Tribe's elections, Vice President Scott Herman unseated Tribal President Rodney M. Bordeaux. Edward Peter-Paul won reelection as tribal chief of the Mi’kmaq Nation in Maine.

In July 2021, St. Regis Mohawk Tribe voters elected Ronald LaFrance Jr. chief in a special election, ousting incumbent chief Eric Thompson. Thompson had narrowly beaten LaFrance, who ran as a write-in candidate in the regular June election, but appeals called that election into question, resulting in the special election.

The Cherokee Nation held elections to its Tribal Council on June 5.

== Table of state, territorial, and federal results ==
This table shows the partisan results of president, congressional, gubernatorial, and state legislative races held in each state and territory in 2021. Note that not all states and territories hold gubernatorial, state legislative, and Senate elections in 2021. The five territories and Washington, D. C., do not elect members of the Senate, and the territories do not take part in presidential elections; instead, they each elect one non-voting member of the House. Nebraska's unicameral legislature and the governorship and legislature of American Samoa are elected on a non-partisan basis, and, therefore, political party affiliation is not listed.

State/terr. and PVI		Before 2021 elections				After 2021 elections			
State or territory	2021 PVI	Governor	State leg.	U.S. Senate	U.S. House	Governor	State leg.	U.S. Senate	U.S. House
Alabama	R+15	Rep	Rep	Rep	Rep 6–1	Rep	Rep	Rep	Rep 6–1
Alaska	R+9	Rep	Split (Note: Republicans won a majority of seats in the state house, but Democrats formed a majority coalition with independents and some Republicans.)	Rep	Rep 1–0	Rep	Split (Note: Republicans won a majority of seats in the state house, but Democrats formed a majority coalition with independents and some Republicans.)	Rep	Rep 1–0
Arizona	R+3	Rep	Rep	Dem	Dem 5–4	Rep	Rep	Dem	Dem 5–4
Arkansas	R+16	Rep	Rep	Rep	Rep 4–0	Rep	Rep	Rep	Rep 4–0
California	D+14	Dem	Dem	Dem	Dem 42–11	Dem	Dem	Dem	Dem 42–11
Colorado	D+3	Dem	Dem	Dem	Dem 4–3	Dem	Dem	Dem	Dem 4–3
Connecticut	D+7	Dem	Dem	Dem	Dem 5–0	Dem	Dem	Dem	Dem 5–0
Delaware	D+6	Dem	Dem	Dem	Dem 1–0	Dem	Dem	Dem	Dem 1–0
Florida	R+3	Rep	Rep	Rep	Rep 16–11	Rep	Rep	Rep	Rep 16–11
Georgia	R+3	Rep	Rep	Dem	Rep 8–6	Rep	Rep	Dem	Rep 8–6
Hawaii	D+15	Dem	Dem	Dem	Dem 2–0	Dem	Dem	Dem	Dem 2–0
Idaho	R+19	Rep	Rep	Rep	Rep 2–0	Rep	Rep	Rep	Rep 2–0
Illinois	D+7	Dem	Dem	Dem	Dem 13–5	Dem	Dem	Dem	Dem 13–5
Indiana	R+11	Rep	Rep	Rep	Rep 7–2	Rep	Rep	Rep	Rep 7–2
Iowa	R+6	Rep	Rep	Rep	Rep 3–1	Rep	Rep	Rep	Rep 3–1
Kansas	R+11	Dem	Rep	Rep	Rep 3–1	Dem	Rep	Rep	Rep 3–1
Kentucky	R+16	Dem	Rep	Rep	Rep 5–1	Dem	Rep	Rep	Rep 5–1
Louisiana	R+12	Dem	Rep	Rep	Rep 5–1	Dem	Rep	Rep	Rep 5–1
Maine	D+1	Dem	Dem	Split R/I (Note: One of Maine's senators, Susan Collins, is a Republican. The other senator from Maine, Angus King, is an independent who has caucused with the Democrats since taking office in 2013.)	Dem 2–0	Dem	Dem	Split R/I	Dem 2–0
Maryland	D+14	Rep	Dem	Dem	Dem 7–1	Rep	Dem	Dem	Dem 7–1
Massachusetts	D+14	Rep	Dem	Dem	Dem 9–0	Rep	Dem	Dem	Dem 9–0
Michigan	R+1	Dem	Rep	Dem	Split 7–7	Dem	Rep	Dem	Split 7–7
Minnesota	D+1	Dem	Split	Dem	Split 4–4	Dem	Split	Dem	Split 4–4
Mississippi	R+10	Rep	Rep	Rep	Rep 3–1	Rep	Rep	Rep	Rep 3–1
Missouri	R+11	Rep	Rep	Rep	Rep 6–2	Rep	Rep	Rep	Rep 6–2
Montana	R+11	Rep	Rep	Split	Rep 1–0	Rep	Rep	Split	Rep 1–0
Nebraska	R+13	Rep	NP	Rep	Rep 3–0	Rep	NP	Rep	Rep 3–0
Nevada	Even	Dem	Dem	Dem	Dem 3–1	Dem	Dem	Dem	Dem 3–1
New Hampshire	Even	Rep	Rep	Dem	Dem 2–0	Rep	Rep	Dem	Dem 2–0
New Jersey	D+6	Dem	Dem	Dem	Dem 10–2	Dem	Dem	Dem	Dem 10–2
New Mexico	D+3	Dem	Dem	Dem	Dem 2–1	Dem	Dem	Dem	Dem 2–1
New York	D+10	Dem	Dem	Dem	Dem 19–8	Dem	Dem	Dem	Dem 19–8
North Carolina	R+3	Dem	Rep	Rep	Rep 8–5	Dem	Rep	Rep	Rep 8–5
North Dakota	R+20	Rep	Rep	Rep	Rep 1–0	Rep	Rep	Rep	Rep 1–0
Ohio	R+6	Rep	Rep	Split	Rep 12–4	Rep	Rep	Split	Rep 12–4
Oklahoma	R+20	Rep	Rep	Rep	Rep 5–0	Rep	Rep	Rep	Rep 5–0
Oregon	D+6	Dem	Dem	Dem	Dem 4–1	Dem	Dem	Dem	Dem 4–1
Pennsylvania	R+2	Dem	Rep	Split	Split 9–9	Dem	Rep	Split	Split 9–9
Rhode Island	D+8	Dem	Dem	Dem	Dem 2–0	Dem	Dem	Dem	Dem 2–0
South Carolina	R+8	Rep	Rep	Rep	Rep 6–1	Rep	Rep	Rep	Rep 6–1
South Dakota	R+16	Rep	Rep	Rep	Rep 1–0	Rep	Rep	Rep	Rep 1–0
Tennessee	R+14	Rep	Rep	Rep	Rep 7–2	Rep	Rep	Rep	Rep 7–2
Texas	R+5	Rep	Rep	Rep	Rep 23–13	Rep	Rep	Rep	Rep 23–13
Utah	R+13	Rep	Rep	Rep	Rep 4–0	Rep	Rep	Rep	Rep 4–0
Vermont	D+15	Rep	Dem	Split D/I (Note: One of Vermont's senators, Patrick Leahy, is a Democrat. The other senator from Vermont, Bernie Sanders, was elected as an independent and has caucused with the Democrats since taking office in 2007.)	Dem 1–0	Rep	Dem	Split D/I	Dem 1–0
Virginia	D+2	Dem	Dem	Dem	Dem 7–4	Rep	Split	Dem	Dem 7–4
Washington	D+8	Dem	Dem	Dem	Dem 7–3	Dem	Dem	Dem	Dem 7–3
West Virginia	R+23	Rep	Rep	Split	Rep 3–0	Rep	Rep	Split	Rep 3–0
Wisconsin	R+2	Dem	Rep	Split	Rep 5–3	Dem	Rep	Split	Rep 5–3
Wyoming	R+26	Rep	Rep	Rep	Rep 1–0	Rep	Rep	Rep	Rep 1–0
United States	Even	Rep 27–23	Rep 29–18–2	Dem 50–50	Dem 222–213	Rep 28–22	Rep 29–17–3	Dem 50–50	Dem 222–213
Washington, D. C.	D+43	Dem (Note: Washington, D.C., does not elect a governor or state legislature, but it does elect a mayor and a city council. If the city attains statehood, the mayoral and council elections will be repurposed as those for the governor and House of Delegates respectively.)	Dem	—N/a	Dem	Dem	Dem	—N/a	Dem
American Samoa	—N/a	NP/D (Note: Although elections for governor of American Samoa are non-partisan, Governor Lemanu Peleti Mauga affiliates with the Democratic Party.)	NP	—N/a	Rep	NP/D	NP	—N/a	
Guam	—N/a	Dem	Dem	—N/a	Dem			—N/a	
N. Mariana Islands	—N/a	Rep	Split (Note: Republicans control the Northern Mariana Islands Senate, but no party holds a majority in the Northern Mariana Islands House of Representatives.)	—N/a	Ind (Note: The Northern Mariana Islands' delegate to Congress, Gregorio Sablan, was elected as an Independent and has caucused with the Democrats since taking office in 2009.)			—N/a	
Puerto Rico	—N/a	PNP/D (Note: Puerto Rican Governor Pedro Pierluisi is a member of the Puerto Rican New Progressive Party, but affiliates with the Democratic Party at the national level.)	PDP	—N/a	PNP/R (Note: Puerto Rico's Resident Commissioner, Jenniffer González, was elected as a member of the New Progressive Party and has caucused with the Republicans since taking office in 2017.)	PNP/D		—N/a	PNP/R
U.S. Virgin Islands	—N/a	Dem	Dem	—N/a	Dem			—N/a	
State or territory	PVI	Governor	State leg.	U.S. Senate	U.S. House	Governor	State leg.	U.S. Senate	U.S. House
State/terr. and PVI		Before 2021 elections				After 2021 elections			
