= Paffrath =

Paffrath is a surname. Notable people with the name include:

- Amy Paffrath (born 1963), American television presenter and actress
- Bob Paffrath (1918–2015), American football player
- Kevin Paffrath (born 1992), American YouTuber and real estate broker
