= 2022 United States elections =

- ← 2020 2021 2022 2023 2024 → Midterm elections
- Election day: November 8
- Incumbent president: ▌Joe Biden (D)
- Next Congress: 118th

Senate elections
- Overall control: Democratic hold
- Seats contested: 35 of 100 seats (34 seats of Class III + 1 special election) (Note: Including a concurrent special and regular elections in California)
- Net seat change: Democratic +1
- Map of the 2022 Senate races Democratic gain Democratic hold Republican hold No election Rectangular inset (Oklahoma): both seats were up for election

House elections
- Overall control: Republican gain
- Seats contested: All 435 voting seats 5 of 6 non-voting seats
- Popular vote margin: Republican +2.7%
- Net seat change: Republican +9
- Map of the 2022 House races Democratic gain Republican gain Democratic hold Republican hold

Gubernatorial elections
- Seats contested: 39 (36 states, 3 territories)
- Net seat change: Democratic +2
- Map of the 2022 gubernatorial elections Democratic gain Republican gain Democratic hold Republican hold Independent gain No election

Elections were held in the United States on November 8, 2022. In these midterm elections, which occurred during incumbent Democratic president Joe Biden's term, all 435 seats in the U.S. House of Representatives and 35 of the 100 seats in the U.S. Senate were contested to determine the 118th United States Congress. Thirty-nine state and territorial U.S. gubernatorial elections, as well as numerous state and local elections, were also contested. This was the first election affected by the 2022 redistricting that followed the 2020 census. Despite a Democratic administration, the Republican Party underperformed expectations, failing to secure control of the Senate and winning a bare majority in the House of Representatives.

Midterm elections typically see the incumbent president's party lose a substantial number of seats, but Democrats outperformed the historical trend and a widely anticipated red wave did not materialize. Republicans narrowly won the House due to their overperformance in the nation's four largest states: Texas, Florida, New York and California. Democrats increased their seats in the Senate by one, as they won races in critical battleground states, where voters rejected Donald Trump-aligned Republican candidates. This was the fifth election cycle in history in which the president's party gained Senate seats and simultaneously lost House seats in a midterm, along with 1914, 1962, 1970, and 2018.

The Democratic Party's strength in state-level and senatorial elections was unexpected, as well as historic. They won a net gain of two seats in the gubernatorial elections, flipping the governorships in Arizona, Maryland, and Massachusetts; conversely, Republicans flipped Nevada's governorship. In the state legislative elections, Democrats flipped both chambers of the Michigan Legislature, the Minnesota Senate, and the Pennsylvania House, and achieved a coalition government in the Alaska Senate. As a result of these legislative and gubernatorial results, Democrats gained government trifectas in Michigan for the first time since 1985, and in Massachusetts, Maryland, and Minnesota for the first time since 2015. 2022 is the first midterm since 1934 in which the president's party did not lose any state legislative chambers or incumbent senators. It was also the first midterm since 1986 in which either party achieved a net gain of governorships while holding the presidency, and the first since 1934 in which the Democrats did so under a Democratic president. Governor Ron DeSantis of Florida, previously considered one of the nation's most contested swing states, won reelection in a landslide, as did Senator Marco Rubio. More generally, Florida was one of the only states where the predicted 'red wave' materialized.

Six referendums to preserve or expand abortion access uniformly won, including in the states of Kansas, (Note: The 2022 Kansas Value Them Both Amendment referendum took place on August 2.) Kentucky, Michigan, and Montana, as did those increasing the minimum wage (Nebraska, Nevada, and Washington, D.C.) and expanding Medicaid coverage (South Dakota), while Maryland and Missouri became the latest states to legalize recreational cannabis. Voters in Nevada also approved ranked voting over first-past-the-post, while those in Illinois and Tennessee approved a state constitutional right to collectively bargain and a right-to-work law, respectively.

Issues that favored Democrats included significant concern over perceived extremism and threats to democracy among many Trump-endorsed Republican candidates, the unpopularity of the Supreme Court's Dobbs decision on abortion that reversed Roe v. Wade, the weariness of a potential Trump 2024 campaign, and backlash over the January 6 United States Capitol attack. Candidate quality played a major role, particularly in the Senate, as many Republican candidates became embroiled in scandals during the campaign that led to underperformances in key races. On the other hand, Democrats' political prospects were weighed down by the 2021–2022 inflation spike, which Republicans blamed on President Biden and the Democratic-controlled Congress. General turnout and turnout among voters aged 18–29, who are a strongly Democratic constituency, were the second-highest (after 2018) of any midterm since the 1970 U.S. elections. The elections maintained demographic trends that began in 2012, in which Republicans made gains among the working class, especially White people. Republicans continued their trend since 2016 of making gains among minorities, including Latinos. Democrats continued their trend of improved performance among White college-educated voters.

== Background ==
After the 2020 elections, Democrats had a federal trifecta for the first time since the 111th United States Congress in 2011. This gave them a relatively straightforward path to enacting legislation, but the presence of more centrist or conservative Democrats, namely Joe Manchin and Kyrsten Sinema, meant that most of the more expansive and often more progressive legislation was blocked. In the White House, Joe Biden started his term out with positive approval ratings, particularly for his response to the COVID-19 pandemic in the United States, although at about 54 percent it was the lowest approval rating (other than Donald Trump) of a president's first 100 days since 1953, reflecting the country's growing partisanship.

By mid-2021, as the year progressed with the SARS-CoV-2 Delta variant and the Fall of Kabul, and as key legislation stalled, Biden and Democrats lost popularity and suffered electoral losses, including an upset loss in the 2021 Virginia gubernatorial election, which were widely characterized as a red wave election and as a prelude to the 2022 midterms. In addition, the incumbent president almost always loses seats in Congress and often at least one chamber or overall control, in particular since the post-war period.

Going into 2022, Republicans capitalized on high inflation, crime, and gas prices, and gained a substantial lead in the election climate towards 2022 results similar to the red wave of 2010. The overturning of Roe v. Wade by the Supreme Court of the United States in the June 2022 Dobbs v. Jackson Women's Health Organization decision led to a spike in Democratic voters' fervor, which narrowed the gap despite Biden's underwater approval ratings, amid better-than-expected election results during this period; this led some observers to wonder whether the 2022 midterms could break the incumbent president's losses and reflect the 1998 United States elections, as well as the 2002 United States elections, both of which showed increased support for the incumbent president, amid the impeachment of Bill Clinton (1998) and the aftermath of the September 11 attacks (2002). By October, Republicans regained a substantial margin in pre-election polls, which led to widespread predictions for a red wave election in favor of Republicans, including the possibility of flipping some blue seats in Southern California under those circumstances, though polls remained within the margin of error.

== Campaign ==
=== Primaries ===
After suffering losses in 2021, progressives within the Democratic Party saw improved but mixed results in 2022, with both progressives and moderates winning important races. In 2022, Democratic campaign arms aided radical-right candidates in Republican primary elections, believing they would be easier opponents in the general election. Republican primary candidates who had been endorsed by Trump tended to win, with his support being crucial for many, though his percentage was lower than in previous years, largely due to him taking riskier endorsements. Generally, candidates that received Trump's endorsements were on the far right and those who supported his false claims that there was widespread fraud in the 2020 U.S. presidential election. Trump issued primary endorsements to 37 candidates who ran in the general elections in November that were rated as competitive by The Cook Political Report with Amy Walter.

=== Issues ===
==== Economy ====
Voters suffered from historically high consumer prices, gas prices, and interest rates, which Republicans blamed on Biden's and Democratic policies, as well as government spending; Democrats argued that it was linked to the global surge of inflation, the COVID-19 pandemic-related supply chain issues, and the Russian invasion of Ukraine.

The economy, inflation in particular, remained the top issue for voters throughout 2022. According to an October 2022 Monmouth University poll, 82 percent of Americans considered inflation to be an "extremely or very essential issue" for the government to handle, and seven in ten Americans disapproved of Biden's handling of the cost of living rise. It is not clear whether there is a correlation between rise of inflation, particularly the rise of gas prices, and lower presidential approval ratings, which can cause negative election results; some studies suggest that historically it can hurt the incumbent president in terms of election results, but that this got weaker in recent years.

==== Abortion ====
Following the ruling of the U.S. Supreme Court in Dobbs v. Jackson Women's Health Organization that overturned Roe v. Wade in June 2022, Democrats outperformed Biden's results in the 2020 U.S. presidential election in several House special elections, with abortion cited as a major contributor to their victories, as many Republican-controlled states passed restrictive abortion laws, including a total or near-total ban on the procedure. Democrats tried to pass a federal law to protect the right to abortion but did not have enough support in the Senate, and abortion was prioritized as an issue for the general elections. Some Democrats, including party strategists and pollsters, were divided on whether this could help them or if focusing on the economy and inflation, as the latter seemed to grow a bigger concern among voters in the fall, was a better strategy. This led some observers, as well as several major news outlets, including among others ABC News, CNN, and NBC News, to question whether their focus on abortion was the best strategy to avoid losses in the midterms and if it had lost significance since spring.

The Dobbs ruling made abortion more important for voters, with a rise in support among voters, particularly young women, for Democrats coming after the decision; at least six states had an abortion-related ballot initiative, the most ever in a single year. After Dobbs, Republicans attempted to pass several anti-abortion laws at the state level where they were not fully banned, including removal of incest and rape exceptions, but suffered from internal division on the issue. Lindsey Graham, who was not up for reelection in 2022, introduced a federal bill to ban abortions after 15 weeks; most Republicans argued that abortion regulations should be left to the states, and Graham's proposal received a mixed response among Republicans. In several states, such as Indiana, South Carolina, and West Virginia, they struggled to pass new state-level bans and restrictions on abortion despite controlling the state legislatures because they could not agree on their restrictions.

==== Crime and gun violence ====
Mass shootings made gun violence and crime more important issues for voters, in particular after the Robb Elementary School shooting in May 2022, which is common in the aftermath of school shootings. The Bipartisan Safer Communities Act, which passed in June 2022, provided extended gun-safety laws and was touted by Biden and Democrats. Despite this, Republicans maintained a lead among voters who cited crime as a major issue.

Republicans blamed the increase in violent crime and homicides in 2020 and 2021 on progressives and liberals, as well as attempts to "defund the police", a slogan supported by racial justice protesters but eventually rejected by Biden. In a June 2022 Supreme Court decision, the Roberts Court further expanded the right to keep and bear arms in the United States. Democrats pushed for stricter gun laws, including a ban on assault weapons, while Republicans sought to protect legal access to guns and the Second Amendment to the U.S. Constitution.

==== Democracy ====
Democrats campaigned on strengthening democratic institutions, having said that Trumpist supporters grew increasingly authoritarian or "semi-fascist", as Biden had called them in August and September 2022, since Trump and many Republicans continue to contest the results of the 2020 presidential election; as recently as September 2022, Trump said he should be reinstated as president. Democrats also argued that Republicans regaining power would harm U.S. governance, citing the many Republican Trump-endorsed candidates who denied the results of the 2020 U.S. presidential election, which news outlets tracked. As of July 2022, at least 120 Republican candidates endorsed by Trump were 2020 election deniers, a majority of whom ran for the House.

During the party primaries, Republican candidates alleged fraud irrespective of the results; among those who did so and later won the party nomination, Kari Lake said: "We out-voted the fraud." During the general election campaign, Lake refused to say that she would accept the result if she does not win the election, stating that she was "going to win the election, and I will accept that result." Additionally, Republican-controlled states passed laws restricting voting rights or making it harder to vote, as a consequence of Trump's big lie about 2020, which particularly affects minority voters and critics say also reflects a legacy of racial disenfranchisement. In November 2022, Biden said that democracy was on the ballot and cited the attack on Paul Pelosi, husband of the Democratic House leader Nancy Pelosi, stating that Trump's false claims about a stolen election in 2020 had "fuelled the dangerous rise of political violence and voter intimidation over the past two years".

The Democratic Party filed lawsuits to remove Green Party candidates from the ballot, most notably the North Carolina Green Party candidate Matthew Hoh in the 2022 United States Senate election in North Carolina, citing an ongoing investigation into the party for fraudulant signatures. Their warning that Greens could divide progressive voters and give Republicans wins in tight races nonetheless received widespread criticism, and Hoh appeared on the ballot.

==== Education ====
Republicans argued for parents having more control over what their children are taught in schools, being concerned in particular by discussions on topics such as race, gender identity, and sexuality. Democrats dismissed these concerns as a push for censorship, saying that it would especially harm LGBT students. This came amid increased efforts among Republicans to ban books that discuss those topics, particularly in Republican-controlled states like Florida.

Twenty Republican candidates promulgated the litter boxes in schools hoax, which emerged largely as backlash against recognition of gender variance in schools. House minority leader Kevin McCarthy vowed to "recover lost learning from school closures" during the COVID-19 pandemic in the United States.

==== Climate change ====
In this election, climate change was a significant issue. 71% of voters considered climate change as a serious problem, even though there were differences in the level of concern. One poll showed that for 51% of voters climate change was one of the more important issues. According to another poll, 64% of people of color were more likely to vote for a candidate that is addressing climate change as one of the three most important points in their agenda. A third poll showed that 9% of voters considered climate change as the most important issue.

Progressive Democrats pushed for legislation to combat the negative effects of climate change, including incentives towards the adoption of renewable energy and electric cars. In August 2022, Biden signed into law the Inflation Reduction Act, which also included climate change-related policies to address it, and has been described as the first major or significant climate change law, as well as the largest investment to fight climate change in U.S. history.

==== Immigration ====
Immigration is among the issues where the United States is divided the most. Biden revoked some of Trump's anti-immigration policies but not others, and Republicans pledged to continue Trump's hardline policies. An increase of over 385% in border encounters from 2020 to 2022 gave Republicans an edge over Democrats, as Republicans blamed it on Biden and Democrats, and polling showed that voters moderately preferred Republicans over Democrats for solving immigration problems.

In a September 2022 political stunt, Florida governor Ron DeSantis had migrants sent to Martha's Vineyard. This was also done by Republican governors in Arizona and Texas who sent migrants to northerner, more liberal states, which was criticized by Biden, Democrats, and migrant rights groups as a "cruel political theatre".

==== Student loan forgiveness ====
Since Biden revealed a plan for student loan forgiveness in August 2022 through an executive order based upon the Higher Education Relief Opportunities For Students Act of 2003, both parties sought electoral gains from the decision, with Democrats potentially attracting young voters who would benefit from the program, and Republicans targeting blue-collar workers who likely did not go to college and would be unwilling to help subsidize the education debts of others. A majority of voters were found to support student loan forgiveness in the run-up to the election.

During the election campaign, conservatives and Republicans attempted to find plaintiffs, as part of an effort to sue the Biden administration over the proposal, and take the case to the Supreme Court; this temporarily blocked the plan, which included cancelling up to $10,000 of student debt for those making less than $125,000 a year and up to $20,000 for Pell Grant recipients, as the courts will have to consider legal challenges. In November 2022, a federal judge in Texas struck down Biden's student loan plan. In response, Biden extended a moratorium on the plan from January 2023 to June 2023.

==== Presidency of Joe Biden ====
Republicans were benefiting from Biden's low U.S. presidential approval ratings, hovering from 30–40% for much of the year. His ratings briefly increased after several legislative victories in August and September 2022; by October, they again plateaued when voters focused back on the state of the economy. Biden avoided intervention in several key Senate races, among them Arizona, Georgia, and New Hampshire, where his ratings were further below his presidential approval nationally.

==== Russian invasion of Ukraine ====
The Russian invasion of Ukraine was the major foreign policy issue, shifting support for Biden and highlighting the Republican Party's perceived support for Russia and Vladimir Putin. One day before election day, Russian entrepreneur Yevgeny Prigozhin, who was in the center of accusations of hidden propaganda activities by the Russian government, in regard to Russian interference in U.S. elections, wrote on Vkontakte: "We have interfered, we are interfering and we will continue to interfere."

=== Campaign spending ===
With a total of almost 17 billion U.S. dollars in expenditure, the election campaigns for the 2022 midterm elections were the most expensive in the history of the United States.

== Federal elections ==
=== Senate elections ===
Control of Senate seats by class after the 2022 elections
| Class | Democratic | Independent | Republican | Next elections |
|---|---|---|---|---|
| 1 | 20 | 3 | 10 | 2024 |
| 2 | 13 | 0 | 20 | 2026 |
| 3 | 15 | 0 | 19 | 2028 |
| Total | 48 | 3 (Note: Bernie Sanders and Angus King are Independents but caucus with the Senate Democrats and are counted with them. Kyrsten Sinema switched from Democrat to Independent in December 2022.) | 49 | —N/a |

Thirty-five of the 100 seats in the U.S. Senate were up for election, including all 34 Class 3 senator seats. Concurrent with the regularly scheduled Class 3 elections, a special election was held to fill a Class 2 vacancy in Oklahoma. As senators serve six-year terms, the last regularly scheduled elections for Class 3 senators were held in 2016. The winners of the Senate elections were sworn in on January 3, 2023, for the 118th U.S. Congress. Going into the election, Democrats and Republicans both held 50 seats, but Democrats had a majority due to their control of the vice presidency, which has the power to break ties in the Senate. In the Senate elections, Republicans defended 21 seats, including six seats left open by retirements. Democrats defended fourteen seats, one of which was an open seat.

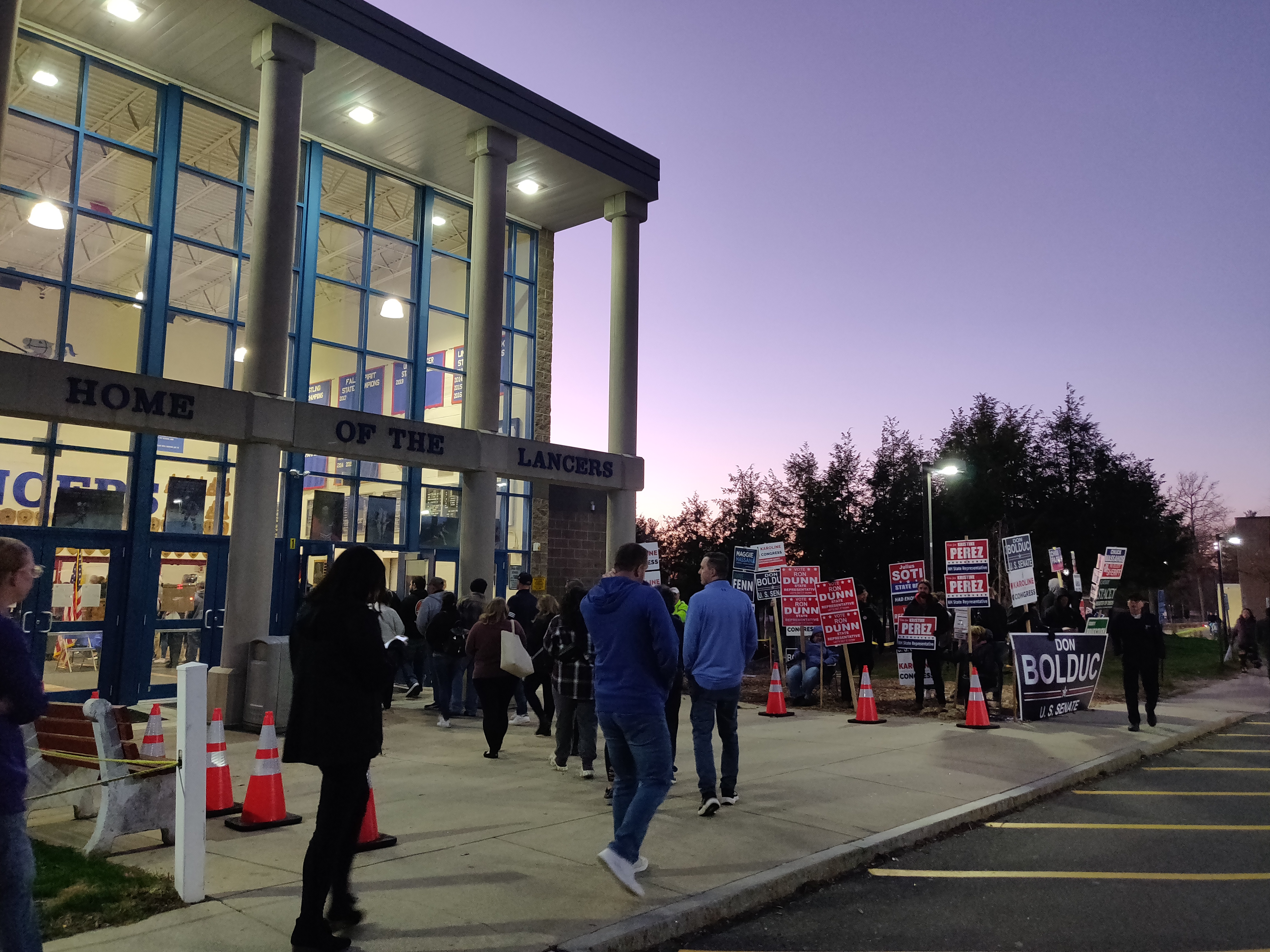
Voters at a polling location in Londonderry, New Hampshire

This was the third consecutive midterm election in the incumbent president's first term in which the party not occupying the White House was able to win control of the House but was unable to win the Senate. Democrats performed better than expected in New Hampshire, Pennsylvania (where they gained a seat – the sole flipping seat), and Nevada, which allowed them to retain control of the Senate, and with an increased majority after winning the runoff election in Georgia.

==== Special elections ====
Two special elections took place in 2022 to replace senators who resigned during the 117th U.S. Congress:

- California Class 3: Incumbent Kamala Harris was elected as Vice President of the United States and resigned from the Senate on January 18, 2021, to take office also as the ex officio President of the Senate. Governor Gavin Newsom used his power to appoint the secretary of state of California, Alex Padilla, to succeed her. A special election to fill the remaining weeks of Harris's tenure was held on November 8, 2022, the same day as the regular election for a six-year term, as a writ proclaimed by Newsom. Padilla won both the special election and the regularly scheduled election.
- Oklahoma Class 2: Incumbent Jim Inhofe announced in February 2022 that he would resign from the Senate at the end of the 117th Congress on January 3, 2023. A special election to fill the remaining four years of his term was held on November 8, 2022, concurrently with the regular election for the Class 3 seat, held by James Lankford. Republican Congressman Markwayne Mullin won the special election to fill the remainder of Inhofe's term.

==== Post-election party switches ====
In early December 2022, Kyrsten Sinema of Arizona announced she would leave the Democratic Party and register as an independent. She justified her decision in an op-ed for The Arizona Republic on December 9, saying: "Like a lot of Arizonans, I have never fit perfectly in either national party." While she did not say if she would caucus with the Senate Democrats, as the Senate's two other independent senators do, she ruled out caucusing with Republicans.

=== House of Representatives elections ===
All 435 voting seats in the U.S. House of Representatives were up for election. Forty-nine representatives and one non-voting delegate (30 Democrats, 20 Republicans) did not seek re-election, and three seats were vacant at the time of the election. The incumbents in the 2022 elections were determined in the 2020 U.S. House of Representatives elections and subsequent special elections. These elections were the first conducted after the 2020 U.S. redistricting cycle, causing several districts to lack an incumbent or have multiple incumbents. Democrats held a 220–212 majority at the time of the election. The race was competitive and closer than expected, with Republicans gaining control of the chamber with a slim 222–213 majority.

==== Special elections ====
Nine special elections were held in 2022:

- Florida's 20th congressional district: Democrat Sheila Cherfilus-McCormick defeated Republican Jason Mariner to succeed Democrat Alcee Hastings, who died on April 6, 2021, from pancreatic cancer. The district has a partisan index of D+28.
- California's 22nd congressional district: Republican Connie Conway defeated Democrat Lourin Hubbard in a runoff to succeed Republican Devin Nunes, who resigned on January 1, 2022, to become CEO of the Trump Media & Technology Group. The district has a partisan index of R+6.
- Texas's 34th congressional district: Republican Mayra Flores defeated Democrat Dan Sanchez to succeed Democrat Filemon Vela Jr., who resigned on March 31, 2022, to work for Akin Gump Strauss Hauer & Feld. The district has a partisan index of D+5.
- Nebraska's 1st congressional district: Republican Mike Flood defeated Democrat Patty Pansing Brooks to succeed Republican Jeff Fortenberry, who resigned on March 31, 2022, after he was indicted and arrested for lying to the FBI about campaign contributions. The district has a partisan index of R+11.
- Minnesota's 1st congressional district: Republican Brad Finstad defeated Democrat Jeff Ettinger to succeed Republican Jim Hagedorn, who died on February 17, 2022, from kidney cancer. The district has a partisan index of R+8.
- Alaska's at-large congressional district: Democrat Mary Peltola defeated Republicans Sarah Palin and Nick Begich III to succeed Republican Don Young, who died on March 18, 2022. The district has a partisan index of R+9.
- New York's 19th congressional district: Democrat Pat Ryan defeated Republican Marc Molinaro to succeed Democrat Antonio Delgado, who resigned on May 25, 2022, to become Lieutenant Governor of New York. The district has a partisan index of R+3.
- New York's 23rd congressional district: Republican Joe Sempolinski defeated Democrat Max Della Pia to succeed Republican Tom Reed, who resigned on May 10, 2022, amid sexual assault allegations. The district has a partisan index of R+9.
- Indiana's 2nd congressional district: Republican Rudy Yakym defeated Democrat Paul Steury to succeed Republican Jackie Walorski, who died on August 3, 2022, in a traffic collision. The district has a partisan index of R+13.

== State elections ==
Partisan control of state governments following the 2022 elections: Democratic trifecta maintained Republican trifecta maintained Democratic trifecta established Divided government established Divided government maintained Officially non-partisan, unicameral legislature

=== Gubernatorial elections ===
Elections were held for the governorships of 36 U.S. states and three insular areas. As most governors serve four-year terms, the last regularly scheduled elections for most seats up for election in 2022 were held in 2018. The governors of New Hampshire and Vermont each serve two-year terms, so incumbents in these two states were determined in 2020. Prior to the election, Republicans held a total of 28 seats, 20 of which were up for election in 2022, and Democrats held 22 seats, 16 of which were up for election. Democrats picked up the seats of retiring and term-limited Republican incumbents in Arizona, Maryland, and Massachusetts, while Republicans held onto Arkansas.

Democratic incumbents won high-profile contests in Michigan and Wisconsin, while Democrat Josh Shapiro's defeat of Republican Doug Mastriano allowed Democrats to retain control of Pennsylvania's gubernatorial office. A Democratic incumbent also prevailed in a closely contested race in Kansas, while the party held onto Oregon in another closely contested race. Tina Kotek of Oregon is set to be one of the first lesbian governors in the United States, along with Maura Healey in Massachusetts. Meanwhile, Republican incumbents won reelection in major races in Florida, Georgia, and Texas, and Mike Dunleavy won reelection to a second term, becoming the first Republican governor of Alaska to be reelected to a second term since Jay Hammond in 1978 and the first governor, regardless of political affiliation, to be reelected to a second term since Tony Knowles in 1998. Democrats made a further gain in Arizona, which set the record for most female governors in U.S. history. The sole gain for Republicans was in Nevada, where Joe Lombardo narrowly defeated the incumbent Democratic governor Steve Sisolak.

=== Other state executive elections ===
Results from 2022 U.S. attorney general elections Democratic gain Republican gain Democratic hold Republican hold Nonpartisan No election

Various state-wide executive positions across several states held elections in 2022. State attorneys general were elected in thirty U.S. states, three territories, and one federal district. The previous elections for this group of states took place in 2018. The attorney general of Vermont serves two-year terms and was last elected in 2020. While Democrats flipped Vermont and Charity Clark became the state's first female attorney general, one notable Republican upset was Brenna Bird's narrow win over Tom Miller, the incumbent Democratic attorney general of Iowa and the longest-serving state attorney general in U.S. history.

Secretaries of state were elected in twenty-seven U.S. states. The previous elections for this group of states took place in 2018. The secretary of state of Vermont serves two-year terms and was last elected in 2020. State treasurers and equivalents were elected in twenty-seven U.S. states, plus a special election in Utah. The previous elections for this group of states took place in 2018. The treasurer of Vermont serves two-year terms and was last elected in 2020.

=== State judicial elections ===
Numerous states held judicial elections in 2022. Republicans gained a majority on the North Carolina Supreme Court by picking up two seats, raising the possibility of mid-decade redistricting. In another election with major redistricting implications, Republicans retained a majority on the Supreme Court of Ohio.

=== Legislative elections ===
In 2022, 46 states held regularly scheduled elections in 88 legislative chambers, although not all seats were up in the legislatures holding elections, as some states use staggered terms. Louisiana, Mississippi, New Jersey, and Virginia did not hold regularly scheduled state legislative elections, as those states all hold such elections in odd-numbered years. The District of Columbia and the U.S. territories of American Samoa, Guam, and the U.S. Virgin Islands also held legislative elections in 2022. As in the U.S. House of Representatives, these elections were the first conducted after the 2020 U.S. census and the 2022 U.S. redistricting. Prior to the election, Republicans controlled 60 legislative chambers, Democrats controlled 37 chambers, and a cross-party coalition controlled the Alaska House of Representatives. (Note: Republicans also held de facto control of Nebraska's officially non-partisan unicameral legislature.)

Democrats successfully defended every legislative chamber they had held prior to the election, the first time the president's party accomplished this feat in a midterm since the 1934 U.S. elections. However, Republicans established a cross-party coalition in the Alaska House of Representatives, shifting the majority from a predominantly Democratic caucus to a predominantly Republican caucus. Democrats picked up the Pennsylvania House of Representatives, the Minnesota Senate, both state legislative chambers in Michigan, and also established a cross-party coalition in the Alaska Senate. Democrats had not controlled the Michigan Senate since 1984, one reason being that although Democrats won the popular vote several times (2012, 2018, and 2020), Republicans continued to win more seats due to a more favorable map. This map was redrawn by an independent commission in 2021, which was established by a 2018 ballot initiative. As a result of victories in state legislative and gubernatorial elections, Democrats gained government trifectas in Maryland, Massachusetts, Michigan, and Minnesota. In addition, Republicans lost a trifecta in Arizona, which they held since 2009, while Democrats lost a trifecta in Nevada. Following the election, although Republicans held trifectas in more states, more people lived in Democratic-controlled states than in Republican-controlled states.

Though Republican governor Phil Scott won reelection, Democrats gained a veto-proof supermajority in both chambers of the Vermont General Assembly. Republicans gained supermajorities in the Wisconsin Senate, the North Carolina Senate, the South Carolina House of Representatives, and both chambers of the Florida Legislature. At the same time, the Republican Party fell short of attaining a supermajority in the Wisconsin State Assembly and the North Carolina House of Representatives, meaning that Democratic governors in both states will retain the ability to veto legislation that is passed without Democratic support.

=== Referendums ===
Of the many proposed for 2022, 132 ballot measures were certified in 37 states. In response to the U.S. Supreme Court's ruling in Dobbs v. Jackson Women's Health Organization that held there was no constitutional right to abortion in the United States and gave individual states the full power to regulate any aspect of abortion, six states had an abortion‑related ballot measure: California, Kansas, Kentucky, Michigan, Montana, and Vermont. During the August primaries, 59% of Kansas voters rejected their state's Value Them Both Amendment, which would have removed the right to an abortion from the Kansas Constitution. California voters considered Proposition 1 during the general election, which was approved, and amended the Constitution of California to explicitly grant the right to an abortion and contraceptives. All other abortion-related ballot measures also passed.

In Nebraska, Nevada, and Washington, D.C., voters approved to increase the minimum wage, which was in line with most such measures being approved regardless of state partisanship; Republicans had pushed for ballot measures to be made harder to be certified or approved, and one such attempt (requiring 60 percent for any ballot measure to pass) failed in Arkansas. Among electoral reform ballot measures, voters in Nevada also approved to replace the traditional primary system and first-past-the-post voting with top-five ranked-choice voting statewide, though they will need to confirm the measure in 2024 for it to take effect by 2026, as it would change the state constitution; unlike the other ballot measures, this was opposed by both Democrats and Republicans. In Arizona, voters approved a ballot measure that limited medical debt interest rates. In South Dakota, voters approved to expand Medicaid coverage as part of the Affordable Care Act. In Tennessee, voters voted on Amendment 1, which would amend the Constitution of Tennessee to make it illegal for workplaces to require employees to be members of labor unions as a condition for employment; voters in Tennessee approved for the state to have a right-to-work law, while those in Illinois approved for a state constitutional right to collective bargaining.

In five states, voters were asked to make the possession and use of marijuana legal for people 21 and older. In Maryland and Missouri, the measures were approved, while voters in Arkansas, as well as in North and South Dakota, rejected legalization. In Colorado, voters approved the decriminalization and regulation of certain psychedelic plants and fungi. Also on the ballot in five states were measures to abolish slavery in prisons. Alabama, Tennessee, Oregon, and Vermont abolished slavery in prisons; the measure did not pass in Louisiana.

== Local elections ==
Since the beginning of 2022, elections were held for the office of mayor, as well as several other municipal and county-level positions. Major U.S. cities saw incumbent mayors re-elected, including Fort Smith, Arkansas (George McGill); Little Rock, Arkansas (Frank Scott Jr.); Tallahassee, Florida (John E. Dailey); Lexington, Kentucky (Linda Gorton); Flint, Michigan (Sheldon Neeley); Reno, Nevada (Hillary Schieve); Newark, New Jersey (Ras Baraka); Charlotte, North Carolina (Vi Lyles), and Raleigh, North Carolina (Mary-Ann Baldwin); Oklahoma City, Oklahoma (David Holt); Clarksville, Tennessee (Joe Pitts); Murfreesboro, Tennessee (Shane McFarland); Denton, Texas (Gerard Hudspeth); and Washington, D.C. (Muriel Bowser).

Open mayoral seats were won in Anaheim, California (Ashleigh Aitken); Chula Vista, California (John McCann); Long Beach, California (Rex Richardson); Los Angeles, California (Karen Bass); Oakland, California (Sheng Thao); and San Jose, California (Matt Mahan); Augusta, Georgia (Garnett Johnson); Louisville, Kentucky (Craig Greenberg); Henderson, Nevada (Michelle Romero), and North Las Vegas, Nevada (Pamela Goynes-Brown); Columbia, Missouri (Barbara Buffaloe); Providence, Rhode Island (Brett Smiley); Austin, Texas (Kirk Watson); Laredo, Texas (Victor Trevino); Lubbock, Texas; (Tray Payne); and Newport News, Virginia (Phillip Jones). Bass succeeded two-term incumbent Eric Garcetti, (Note: Garcetti has been nominated to the post of U.S. Ambassador to India and it is unknown if he will end his term early. Should this occur, the Los Angeles City Council will appoint an interim mayor to finish the remainder of his term.) and in doing so became the first woman and the second Black person (after Tom Bradley) to be elected mayor of Los Angeles.

In San Bernardino, California, city worker Helen Tran was elected to replace incumbent John Valdivia, who was defeated in the blanket primary. In Shreveport, Louisiana, incumbent Adrian Perkins lost re-election in the Louisiana primary, and was succeeded by the winner of the runoff on December 10, former city councilor Tom Arceneaux, who became the first Republican elected to the position in 28 years. In Norman, Oklahoma, Larry Heikkila defeated one-term incumbent mayor Breea Clark. In Milwaukee, Wisconsin, acting mayor Cavalier Johnson defeated Bob Donovan in a special election to complete the term of Tom Barrett, who resigned in December 2021 to become the U.S. Ambassador to Luxembourg. He is the first African-American and first millennial to be elected mayor of Milwaukee.

== Tribal elections ==
Several notable Native American tribes held elections for tribal executive positions during 2022. The Central Council of the Tlingit and Haida Tribes of Alaska reelected tribal president Chalyee Éesh Richard Peterson to a fifth term; Lynn "Nay" Valbuena was also elected to serve a fifth term as chair of the San Manuel Band of Mission Indians. Terry Rambler won election to a fourth consecutive term as chair of the San Carlos Apache Tribe. Osage Nation principal chief Geoffrey Standing Bear, tribal council chief Beverly Kiohawiton Cook of the St. Regis Mohawk Tribe, Mark Fox of the Three Affiliated Tribes, Jamie Azure of the Turtle Mountain Band of Chippewa Indians, Seneca Nation President Rickey Armstrong Sr., and Wampanoag Tribe of Gay Head Chairperson Cheryl Andrews-Maltais, were all reelected to third terms. Chairman Marshalle Pierite of the Tunica-Biloxi Tribe, the Peoria Tribe of Indians of Oklahoma chief Craig Harper, as well as Prairie Band Potawatomi Nation tribal chairman Joseph Rupnik, were all reelected to a second term. Also reelected were Salt River Pima–Maricopa Indian Community president Martin Harvier and Quapaw Nation chairman Joseph Byrd. Bill Sterud was reelected as chair of the Puyallup Tribe; he first joined the Puyallup Tribal Council in 1978.

Brad KillsCrow was elected to his first full term as chief of the Delaware Tribe of Indians. Reid D. Milanovich was elected chairman of the Agua Caliente Band of Cahuilla Indians, replacing the retiring Jeff Grubbe. Clayton Dumont Jr. won an open seat to become chairman of the Klamath Tribes, Arden L. Kucate was elected governor of the Pueblo of Zuni, Kimberly Jenkins was elected chair of the Kaw Nation, and the Sisseton Wahpeton Oyate in the Dakotas elected J. Garret Renville as their new tribal chair. Lawrence Spottedbird won a contentious race to become chairman of the Kiowa Indian Tribe of Oklahoma. In the Wabanaki Confederacy, the Passamaquoddy Tribe at Motahkmikuk reelected William Nicholas to a fourth term as chief, chief Kirk Francis was elected to serve a sixth term as head of the Penobscot Nation, and tribal representative Rena Newell was elected chief of the Passamaquoddy Tribe at Sipayik, ousting chief Maggie Dana.

Several tribal leaders were defeated when seeking reelection. Buu Nygren defeated Jonathan Nez to become president of the Navajo Nation; Nygren's running mate, Richelle Montoya, is the first woman elected as Navajo Nation vice president. Lora Ann Chaisson defeated August "Cocoa" Creppel in the election for principal chief of the United Houma Nation. Kasey Velasquez defeated chairwoman Gwendena Lee-Gatwood to become the second woman elected to lead the White Mountain Apache Tribe. RoseMary LaClair defeated incumbent Nooksack Indian Tribe chairman Roswell Cline Sr. Former Red Lake Band of Chippewa chairman Floyd "Buck" Jourdain defeated incumbent chairman Darrell Seki Sr. Ryman LeBeau defeated incumbent Harold Fraizer to become chairman-at-large of the Cheyenne River Sioux.

The Yukon-Kuskokwim Delta Regional Tribal Government, formed in 2021 to unite 56 Yup'ik, Cup'ik, and Athabascan tribal governments in the Yukon–Kuskokwim Delta region, held its first elections in November 2022. James Akerelrea was elected tribal president.

Several native groups weighed referendums regarding how tribal membership is determined. The Minnesota Chippewa Tribe, in two advisory referendums, approved removing blood quantum provisions from the tribe's constitution and allowing individual bands or reservations to determine membership requirements. Shareholders of Sealaska Corporation, an Alaska Native corporation, similarly voted to drop blood quantum requirements. The Confederated Tribes of the Grand Ronde Community of Oregon approved a measure to limit tribal disenrollment.

== Table of state, territorial, and federal results ==
This table shows the partisan results of president, congressional, gubernatorial, and state legislative races held in each state and territory in 2022. Note that not all states and territories hold gubernatorial, state legislative, and Senate elections in 2022. The five U.S. territories and Washington, D.C., do not elect members of the Senate, and the territories do not take part in presidential elections; instead, they each elect one of the six non-voting members of the U.S. House of Representatives. The unicameral Nebraska Legislature and the governorship and legislature of American Samoa are elected on a non-partisan basis, and political party affiliation is not listed.

| State/Territory | 2022 PVI | Before 2022 elections | | | | After 2022 elections | | | |
| State/Territory | 2022 PVI | Governor | State leg. | U.S. Senate | U.S. House | Governor | State leg. | U.S. Senate | U.S. House |
|---|---|---|---|---|---|---|---|---|---|
| Alabama | R+15 | Rep | Rep | Rep | Rep 6–1 | Rep | Rep | Rep | Rep 6–1 |
| Alaska | R+8 | Rep | Split (Note: Republicans won a majority of seats in the Alaska House of Representatives, but a majority caucus coalition was formed by a coalition of Democrats, independents, and moderate Republicans. In the Alaska Senate, Republicans held the majority.) | Rep | Dem 1–0 | Rep | Coalition (Note: Republicans won a majority of seats in both the Alaska House of Representatives and Alaska Senate. A new Republican-led coalition of 19 Republicans, 2 Democrats, and 2 independents replaced the prior coalition of Democrats, independents, and moderate Republicans in the House, and a grand coalition caucus was formed by all Democrats and all but 3 Republicans in the Senate.) | Rep | Dem 1–0 |
| Arizona | R+2 | Rep | Rep | Dem | Dem 5–4 | Dem | Rep | Split D/I (Note: One of Arizona's senators, Mark Kelly, is a Democrat. In December 2022, Kyrsten Sinema left the Democratic Party and become an independent politician.) | Rep 6–3 |
| Arkansas | R+16 | Rep | Rep | Rep | Rep 4–0 | Rep | Rep | Rep | Rep 4–0 |
| California | D+13 | Dem | Dem | Dem | Dem 42–11 | Dem | Dem | Dem | Dem 40–12 |
| Colorado | D+4 | Dem | Dem | Dem | Dem 4–3 | Dem | Dem | Dem | Dem 5–3 |
| Connecticut | D+7 | Dem | Dem | Dem | Dem 5–0 | Dem | Dem | Dem | Dem 5–0 |
| Delaware | D+7 | Dem | Dem | Dem | Dem 1–0 | Dem | Dem | Dem | Dem 1–0 |
| Florida | R+3 | Rep | Rep | Rep | Rep 16–11 | Rep | Rep | Rep | Rep 20–8 |
| Georgia | R+3 | Rep | Rep | Dem | Rep 8–6 | Rep | Rep | Dem | Rep 9–5 |
| Hawaii | D+14 | Dem | Dem | Dem | Dem 2–0 | Dem | Dem | Dem | Dem 2–0 |
| Idaho | R+18 | Rep | Rep | Rep | Rep 2–0 | Rep | Rep | Rep | Rep 2–0 |
| Illinois | D+7 | Dem | Dem | Dem | Dem 13–5 | Dem | Dem | Dem | Dem 14–3 |
| Indiana | R+11 | Rep | Rep | Rep | Rep 7–2 | Rep | Rep | Rep | Rep 7–2 |
| Iowa | R+6 | Rep | Rep | Rep | Rep 3–1 | Rep | Rep | Rep | Rep 4–0 |
| Kansas | R+10 | Dem | Rep | Rep | Rep 3–1 | Dem | Rep | Rep | Rep 3–1 |
| Kentucky | R+16 | Dem | Rep | Rep | Rep 5–1 | Dem | Rep | Rep | Rep 5–1 |
| Louisiana | R+12 | Dem | Rep | Rep | Rep 5–1 | Dem | Rep | Rep | Rep 5–1 |
| Maine | D+2 | Dem | Dem | Split R/I (Note: One of Maine's senators, Susan Collins, is a Republican. The other senator from Maine, Angus King, is an independent who has caucused with Democrats since taking office in 2013.) | Dem 2–0 | Dem | Dem | Split R/I | Dem 2–0 |
| Maryland | D+14 | Rep | Dem | Dem | Dem 7–1 | Dem | Dem | Dem | Dem 7–1 |
| Massachusetts | D+15 | Rep | Dem | Dem | Dem 9–0 | Dem | Dem | Dem | Dem 9–0 |
| Michigan | R+1 | Dem | Rep | Dem | Split 7–7 | Dem | Dem | Dem | Dem 7–6 |
| Minnesota | D+1 | Dem | Split | Dem | Split 4–4 | Dem | Dem | Dem | Split 4–4 |
| Mississippi | R+11 | Rep | Rep | Rep | Rep 3–1 | Rep | Rep | Rep | Rep 3–1 |
| Missouri | R+10 | Rep | Rep | Rep | Rep 6–2 | Rep | Rep | Rep | Rep 6–2 |
| Montana | R+11 | Rep | Rep | Split | Rep 1–0 | Rep | Rep | Split | Rep 2–0 |
| Nebraska | R+13 | Rep | NP (Note: The unicameral Nebraska Legislature is officially nonpartisan, but a majority of its members identify as Republicans.) | Rep | Rep 3–0 | Rep | NP | Rep | Rep 3–0 |
| Nevada | R+1 | Dem | Dem | Dem | Dem 3–1 | Rep | Dem | Dem | Dem 3–1 |
| New Hampshire | D+1 | Rep | Rep | Dem | Dem 2–0 | Rep | Rep | Dem | Dem 2–0 |
| New Jersey | D+6 | Dem | Dem | Dem | Dem 10–2 | Dem | Dem | Dem | Dem 9–3 |
| New Mexico | D+3 | Dem | Dem | Dem | Dem 2–1 | Dem | Dem | Dem | Dem 3–0 |
| New York | D+10 | Dem | Dem | Dem | Dem 19–8 | Dem | Dem | Dem | Dem 15–11 |
| North Carolina | R+3 | Dem | Rep | Rep | Rep 8–5 | Dem | Rep | Rep | Split 7–7 |
| North Dakota | R+20 | Rep | Rep | Rep | Rep 1–0 | Rep | Rep | Rep | Rep 1–0 |
| Ohio | R+6 | Rep | Rep | Split | Rep 12–4 | Rep | Rep | Split | Rep 10–5 |
| Oklahoma | R+20 | Rep | Rep | Rep | Rep 5–0 | Rep | Rep | Rep | Rep 5–0 |
| Oregon | D+6 | Dem | Dem | Dem | Dem 4–1 | Dem | Dem | Dem | Dem 4–2 |
| Pennsylvania | R+2 | Dem | Rep | Split | Split 9–9 | Dem | Split | Dem | Dem 9–8 |
| Rhode Island | D+8 | Dem | Dem | Dem | Dem 2–0 | Dem | Dem | Dem | Dem 2–0 |
| South Carolina | R+8 | Rep | Rep | Rep | Rep 6–1 | Rep | Rep | Rep | Rep 6–1 |
| South Dakota | R+16 | Rep | Rep | Rep | Rep 1–0 | Rep | Rep | Rep | Rep 1–0 |
| Tennessee | R+14 | Rep | Rep | Rep | Rep 7–2 | Rep | Rep | Rep | Rep 8–1 |
| Texas | R+5 | Rep | Rep | Rep | Rep 24–12 | Rep | Rep | Rep | Rep 25–13 |
| Utah | R+13 | Rep | Rep | Rep | Rep 4–0 | Rep | Rep | Rep | Rep 4–0 |
| Vermont | D+16 | Rep | Dem | Split D/I (Note: One of Vermont's senators, Patrick Leahy, is a Democrat. The other senator from Vermont, Bernie Sanders, was elected as an independent and has caucused with Democrats since taking office in 2007.) | Dem 1–0 | Rep | Dem | Split D/I | Dem 1–0 |
| Virginia | D+3 | Rep | Split | Dem | Dem 7–4 | Rep | Split | Dem | Dem 6–5 |
| Washington | D+8 | Dem | Dem | Dem | Dem 7–3 | Dem | Dem | Dem | Dem 8–2 |
| West Virginia | R+22 | Rep | Rep | Split | Rep 3–0 | Rep | Rep | Split | Rep 2–0 |
| Wisconsin | R+2 | Dem | Rep | Split | Rep 5–3 | Dem | Rep | Split | Rep 6–2 |
| Wyoming | R+25 | Rep | Rep | Rep | Rep 1–0 | Rep | Rep | Rep | Rep 1–0 |
| United States | Even | Rep 28–22 | Rep 29–17–3 | Dem 50–50 | Dem 220–212 | Rep 26–24 | Rep 27–19–3 | Dem 51–49 | Rep 222–213 |
| Washington, D.C. | D+43 | Dem (Note: The federal district does not have a governor or state legislature but elects the mayor of Washington, D.C., as well as the Council of the District of Columbia.) | Dem | —N/a | Dem | Dem | Dem | —N/a | Dem |
| American Samoa | —N/a | NP/D (Note: Although elections for governor of American Samoa are non-partisan, Governor Lemanu Peleti Mauga affiliates with the Democratic Party.) | NP | —N/a | Rep | NP/D | NP | —N/a | Rep |
| Guam | —N/a | Dem | Dem | —N/a | Dem | Dem | Dem | —N/a | Rep |
| N. Mariana Islands | —N/a | Rep | Split (Note: Republicans control the Northern Mariana Islands Senate, but no party holds a majority in the Northern Mariana Islands House of Representatives.) | —N/a | Dem (Note: The Northern Mariana Islands' delegate to Congress, Gregorio Sablan, was elected as an independent and has caucused with Democrats since taking office in 2009. In 2021, he rejoined the local Democratic Party and ran as a Democrat in 2022.) | Ind | Coalition (Note: A coalition of independents and Democrats maintained control of the Northern Mariana Islands House of Representatives and gained control of the Northern Mariana Islands Senate during the 2022 elections.) | —N/a | Dem |
| Puerto Rico | —N/a | PNP/D (Note: Puerto Rican Governor Pedro Pierluisi is a member of the Puerto Rican New Progressive Party, but affiliates with the Democratic Party at the national level.) | PDP | —N/a | PNP/R (Note: Puerto Rico's Resident Commissioner, Jenniffer González, was elected as a member of the New Progressive Party and has caucused with Republicans since taking office in 2017.) | PNP/D | PDP | —N/a | PNP/R |
| U.S. Virgin Islands | —N/a | Dem | Dem | —N/a | Dem | Dem | Dem | —N/a | Dem |
| State/Territory | PVI | Governor | State leg. | U.S. Senate | U.S. House | Governor | State leg. | U.S. Senate | U.S. House |
| State/Territory | PVI | Before 2022 elections | | | | After 2022 elections | | | |

== Aftermath ==
=== Results ===
The race for Congress was much closer than expected; control of Congress remained uncertain for several days, and the House remained too close to call for over a week, which was not thought to be likely in a national environment favorable to the Republican Party. Organizations that make election calls projected on November 12 that the Democratic Party retained control of the Senate, while later projecting on November 15–16 that Republicans gained control over the House with a slim majority. Abortion and the economy were major issues, and young and independent voters, which Democrats narrowly won while keeping enough of their key voting blocs and could explain their key wins, turned out in record numbers particularly in some key swing states, which were won by Democrats; it is not agreed among experts as to what extent and by how much the youth vote helped Democrats. 2022 is the first midterm since the 1934 U.S. elections in which the president's party did not lose any state legislative chambers or incumbent senators. It was also the first midterm since the 1986 U.S. elections in which either party achieved a net gain of governorships while holding the presidency, which last happened for Republicans in the 1986 U.S. gubernatorial elections, and the first since 1934 in which the Democrats did so under a Democratic president. This also marked the first time since the 1962 U.S. elections that Democrats made a net gain in the Senate while losing House seats.

View source data.
View source data.

Democrats lost just 9 seats in the House, which is below the average losses for the president's party since the 1950s, and gained in the Senate, even though the president's party usually lose many seats in the midterm elections; it was the best performance for the president's party in a midterm election in two decades in terms of seat losses, and historically good when considering Biden's underwater approval ratings. In addition, Democrats gained a Senate seat in Pennsylvania where John Fetterman defeated Mehmet Oz, winning the seat of retiring Republican senator Pat Toomey, while they held their seat in Georgia in a runoff election, after no candidate won a majority of the vote.

Many factors have been attributed to the lack of a red wave and better-than-expected performance for Democrats, including the quality of candidates, youth turnout, and some vote splitting in key races. Incumbent president Joe Biden, a Democrat, and incumbent Florida governor Ron DeSantis of the Republican Party, as well as reproductive rights, have been widely considered as the biggest winners, while former president Donald Trump was considered to be the biggest loser by the election results. Sean Patrick Maloney, the chair of the Democratic House coalition's fundraising arm, lost his reelection bid after ten years in Congress.

Democrats made gains at the gubernatiorial level. In the 2022 Maryland gubernatorial election, Wes Moore, a Democrat, became the state's first African-American governor, while the 2022 Massachusetts gubernatorial election and 2022 Oregon gubernatorial election resulted in Maura Healey and Tina Kotek, both Democrats, becoming the first open lesbian governors in U.S. history. Gretchen Whitmer, the incumbent Democrat, won the 2022 Michigan gubernatorial election. On the Republican side, incumbent governors performed well. Greg Abbott won the 2022 Texas gubernatorial election, while Brian Kemp won the 2022 Georgia gubernatorial election; in both cases, they defeated the Democratic opponents, Beto O'Rourke and Stacey Abrams, respectively, who had lost by narrower margins in 2018. In the 2022 Florida gubernatorial election, DeSantis won in a landslide, challenging the state's battleground status; results showed that he performed better than other Republicans among Hispanics, who got mixed results. Both parties elected female governors, resulting in the most female governors in U.S. history. Incumbent Laura Kelly of the Democratic Party narrowly won the 2022 Kansas gubernatorial election, while Sarah Huckabee Sanders of the Republican Party won the 2022 Arkansas gubernatorial election. Democrats also won the 2022 Arizona gubernatorial election, an office that was previously held by a term-limited Republican, as Katie Hobbs won over Kari Lake. Despite losses, Republicans flipped a governorship from Democrats by winning the 2022 Nevada gubernatorial election, in which Joe Lombardo defeated the incumbent Steve Sisolak, and in the 2022 Alaska gubernatorial election a Republican governor was reelected to a second term for the first time since 1998.

In state legislative elections, Democrats gained full control of government in Minnesota and made gains in Pennsylvania, where a more neutral, independent redrawn map (like in Michigan) gave them a shot to regain control of the state legislature. In one of the most historic results of the night, Democrats gained a trifecta in Michigan for the first time since 1983. For over a week, control of the state legislatures of Alaska, Arizona, New Hampshire, and Pennsylvania was not determined. In Alaska, where for six years Democrats had a cross-coalition majority in the House with independents and moderate Republicans, a similar majority was established in the Senate. In New Hampshire, where Democrats made gains, the race for the House was so close that a series of recounts and legal challenges have followed, leaving the state of the race uncertain. In Pennsylvania, Republicans retained control of the Senate but the House was too close; by November 16, Democrats regained control of the House for the first time since 2010. Referendums to preserve or expand abortion access won in all six states where they were on the ballot (California, Kansas, Kentucky, Michigan, Montana, and Vermont). Those related to increasing the minimum wage (Nebraska, Nevada, and Washington, D.C.) and expanding Medicaid coverage (South Dakota) also passed, while those related to cannabis legalization, some of which for medical uses and some for recreational usage, achieved mixed results. Nevada also approved state ranked-choice voting election reform. Those related to the abolition of penal labor in the United States also generally passed at the state level (Alabama, Tennessee, Oregon, and Vermont), with the exception of Louisiana.

=== January 2023 speaker election ===
Biden described the results as a "strong night" for Democrats, and he urged for cooperation in Congress. Senator Lindsey Graham commented: "It's certainly not a red wave, that's for darn sure. But it is clear that we will take back the House." On November 9, when the results for the House were still uncertain, the Republican House leader Kevin McCarthy launched his bid to succeed long-time House Democrats leader Nancy Pelosi as Speaker of the U.S. House of Representatives. In a letter asking for support among Republicans, he wrote: "I trust you know that earning the majority is only the beginning. Now, we will be measured by what we do with our majority. Now the real work begins." On November 17, after Republicans were projected to win back the House, Pelosi announced that she would not seek reelection as speaker. On November 30, Hakeem Jeffries was selected by acclamation as the Democratic nominee for the House speakership.

Earlier on November 15, McCarthy won an internal Republican caucus poll as their speaker nominee. As several members of the Republican caucus did not vote for him and have expressed opposition to his speakership, it cast doubt on how the U.S. speaker election on January 3 would unfold. McCarthy would ultimately be elected speaker, but on the 15th ballot, due to internal divisions within the House Republican Conference. This resulted in the first speaker election since 1923 in which the speaker was not elected on the first ballot.

=== Analysis ===
Polls both prior to and after the elections found that the status of the economy and inflation was the most important issue for voters, with concern about abortion being relatively low compared to them, and it was widely expected that this would benefit Republicans and potentially produce a red wave election in their favor, which did not happen; Florida and New York were the exception to this national trend. The lack of a red wave election was attributed to, among others, issues that in part favored Democrats, including significant concern over extremism among Republicans and the democratic backsliding in the United States that worsened since Trump won in 2016, abortion rights and the status of abortion in the United States since June 2022 after Dobbs v. Jackson Women's Health Organization overturned the long-held precedent since 1973 of Roe v. Wade that gave a constitutional right to abortion, and the role of Trump and his imminent announcement of a campaign for the 2024 U.S. presidential election. Increasing concerns over climate change and the higher approval of the Inflation Reduction Act of 2022 compared to the previous climate policy also played a role in it, as did turnout. Whether youth turnout in particular helped to explain the results was also debated.

Democrats performed better than expected in states like New Hampshire, North Carolina, Ohio, and Pennsylvania, where Fetterman improved on Biden's 2020 results from white voters without a college degree. Democrats also performed well in Colorado and New England, while Republicans made gains in Florida and New York. Redistricting and gerrymandering affected results. Gerrymanders in Florida, Georgia, Texas, and Ohio, gave Republicans an advantage in the House, while Democrats won 24 of 30 seats, or 80 percent, in Illinois, Nevada, New Mexico, and Oregon, with 54% of the popular vote across these four states. In New York, where Democrats suffered major losses, a gerrymander had been rejected by the courts, while gerrymanders in Florida and Tennessee gave Republicans more seats by virtue of the redistricted map being much more Republican-leaning. Defensive gerrymanders helped both parties hold competitive seats in various states; Republican gains in New York and Democratic gains in North Carolina and Ohio were made possible because state supreme courts overturned gerrymanders passed by their state legislatures.

==== Close results ====
While it is normal to take several days to know the results, including blue shifts and red mirages as Democrats vote by mail more often than Republicans, the fact the race for Congress was competitive, and also closer than expected, resulted in control of the House being uncalled for over a week, with the outcome of several races in western states uncertain; the Senate also remained too close to call. By November 11, control of the Senate remained too close to call but with Democrats slightly favored, as they made a gain in Pennsylvania's open race, where John Fetterman defeated Mehmet Oz in an upset, while three races remained uncalled, all of which are Democratic-held; races had not yet been called in Arizona and Nevada. Democrats had to win two of these three races to maintain control of the Senate, and had to defend their net gain in the Georgia runoff election in December 2022, a competitive election where polls gave Warnock a small edge but remained within the margin of error and both candidates could win, as some polls came from pollsters without established records. Republican attempts to stop early voting, such as the Saturday after Thanksgiving, were blocked by a state court. There was also some concern that Georgia's new state law, which shortened the runoff campaign period, would have negative effects on turnout; research shows that this particularly affects turnout among voters of color.

By November 12, Democrats had retained the Senate, as the Democratic incumbents in Arizona and Nevada (Mark Kelly and Catherine Cortez Masto, respectively) were projected to have retained their seat. The winner of the Senate race in Alaska, one of the few states to use ranked-choice voting in the United States, which saw Republican incumbent Lisa Murkowski and Republican challenger and Trump-endorsed Kelly Tshibaka as the two remaining potential victors of the race, was not determined until November 24, when Murkowski was projected to have won; Warnock, the Democratic incumbent, won the runoff in Georgia on December 6, allowing Democrats to maintain their narrow but newly increased majority; 2022 became the first time since the passage of the Seventeenth Amendment to the U.S. Constitution and the 1914 U.S. Senate elections in which no Senate incumbents lost reelection. Some gubernatorial races, such as in Arizona and Nevada, were not projected for several days, as they were too close call. Kari Lake, the Republican candidate in Arizona who denied Trump's loss in 2020, refused to concede.

Over two weeks later, results in many races were still unknown. Several tossup or key races were won by Democrats, including upsets in Colorado's 8th, North Carolina's 13th, and Washington's 3rd congressional districts, and narrowly missed by 550 votes a further upset for the Colorado's 3rd congressional district seat held by Lauren Boebert. On November 10–12, Republicans were favored to regain control of the House with a narrow majority of 3 seats (221–214) according to NBC News, with 218 seats needed for a majority. On November 13, Republicans and Democrats were projected to win 210–200 seats in the House according to Decision Desk HQ, 211–203 according to the Associated Press, and 211–206 according to ABC News. By November 14, Republicans were projected to possibly have a narrow majority in the House by as little as a single seat. On November 15, the projected seats in favor of Republicans were 217–203 per Decision Desk HQ, 217–205 per the Associated Press, and 215–207 per ABC News. Later on the same day, Decision Desk HQ projected a Republican majority of the House, which was followed on November 16 by NBC News, and by the Associated Press on November 17.

While Republicans won the popular vote by about 3 percent, the larger-than-reflected popular vote margin compared to seats was in part due to the fact Democrats did not contest several seats, which may have cost them about 1–2 percent in the final popular vote margin. Although Republicans would have still won the popular vote, it underscored how close the race for the House was both in terms of the popular vote between each party and the number of seats they won. Harry Enten of CNN observed that Republicans won the House and Senate popular votes by about 3 and 0.1 points, respectively, while Democrats won the gubernatorial popular vote by less than 0.3; this made the overall 2022 elections a historically close election cycle. Enten attributed the overall close results to political polarization, which resulted in a shrinking of the pool of swing voters in the country.

==== Demographic trends ====
Starting in 2012, Democrats suffered losses among the American working class, particularly whites. Since 2016, Republicans made gains among minorities who are working class or Hispanic and Latino Americans; at the same time, Democrats continued to improve among college-educated whites, which helped them win in 2020. In 2022, Republicans made further gains among working-class peoples of color, and also among Hispanic voters, though not to the extent they expected, as Democrats continued to win a majority of their vote. The education divide remained polarized.

According to exit polls, such as from Edison Research, Democrats won a majority of voters under $30,000 and $30,000–49,999, while Republicans won a majority of voters in the $50,000–99,999 and $100,000–199,999 income brackets, with the bigger gap between the two parties being that of those over $200,000, whom Republicans also won. Compared to 2018, which was a blue wave election and saw higher turnout among Democrats, Republicans made gains among women, older people, suburban voters, and whites without college degrees. Most American voters supported abortion rights; in the House, Republicans also won about a quarter of voters who said they support legal abortion.

==== Polling and predictions by pundits ====
Many pundits in the media failed to predict the Democratic resilient performance; Simon Rosenberg was one exception. Republican pollsters such as the Trafalgar Group had a notable polling miss, with errors well outside the margin of error in races such as the 2022 U.S. Senate election in Washington. Since 2016 and 2020, the latter of which was at the height of the COVID-19 pandemic, polling companies attempted to understand the misses in recent years and how to get better. There were also fewer polls in general, and a larger share came from partisan sources. On election eve, an unweighted average of 17 polls indicated that Republicans were expected to defeat Democrats by 2.5% in the generic congressional vote.

Polls were relatively good, especially when compared to 2020, though not as good as what FiveThirtyEight, a polling aggregator website, defines as the Gold Standard (2006–2012). Prior to the elections, it discussed the bias of polls in previous election cycles, which overstated or underestimated both parties, and whether there was now a systematic bias in favor of Democrats since 2016, which was also reflected in 2020, but did not exclude that 2022 could be akin 1998 or 2002 (after Dobbs) or have a bias in favor of Republicans, as it happened. Their own forecasting model, which gave Republicans 59 and 84 percent of winning the Senate (slight favored) and the House (favored), respectively, assumed the possibility that polls underestimated Republicans; its polls-only version saw the Senate as a tossup. Many pollsters had their own worries, and many feared they would miss Republican overperformances as it happened in 2016 and 2020 in particular.

==== Potential green wave ====
Some environmental organizations and media described the result as a green wave, saying candidates addressing climate change did better compared to those considered who did not. Among Republicans who won, they did not campaign against climate measures in the Inflation Reduction Act of 2022. Biden specifically thanked young climate voters. This was also reflected at the state and local level, where voters approved several climate-related initiatives.

==== Speculation about 2024 elections ====
Democrats performed well in states that could be key to the 2024 U.S. elections, and their better-than-expected performance may have avoided a damaging primary for the incumbent president; their net gain in the Senate could also help them as they face a harder map in the 2024 U.S. Senate elections, with many more seats to defend than Republicans. As some moderate Republicans admitted that the party had an extremist problem and had a moment of reckoning, including criticism of Trump among conservatives on social media and cable news, as well as infighting, many analysts believed that the results set up a potential contest between DeSantis and Trump for the 2024 Republican Party presidential primaries. Despite losses, Trump called the results a "great evening", though those close to him reported him "livid" and "furious with everyone" for the losses, in particular the Senate open seat in Pennsylvania. About DeSantis, Trump stated that he was ready to reveal what he described as "bad things" about him, claiming to know him "more than anyone else, perhaps more than [his wife]."

On November 15, the beginning of the Trump 2024 presidential campaign was officially announced. On November 18, attorney general Merrick Garland announced that he appointed Jack Smith as a special counsel to run part of the Department of Justice's probe into the January 6 Capitol attack, which could affect his eligibility under the 14th Amendment to the U.S. Constitution as argued by some legal experts, as well as the FBI investigation into Trump's handling of government documents. Trump's 2024 campaign announcement received wide media coverage and a mixed response from both Democrats and Republicans. Some Democrats warily welcomed the campaign, viewing Trump as beatable, while other Democrats, along with many observers and some Republicans, opposed it, citing the negative effects it could have on U.S. democracy. Some Republicans, consisting mostly of Trump loyalists, welcomed the campaign, while others opposed it, viewing him as a weak candidate who had lost Republicans the past several election cycles including the 2022 midterms and engaged in conspiracy theories, and also cited his legal troubles.

==== Turnout ====
Voter turnout was relatively high by midterm standards, with an estimated 46.6% of the voting-eligible population (Note: "Voting-eligible population" includes all people eligible to register and cast a ballot based upon their age, but excluding foreign nationals and those ineligible to vote under state rules due to current or prior incarceration status.) casting a ballot, or about 114 million people. After the blue wave of 2018, it was the second highest since the 1970 U.S. elections. The trend was further confirmed by turnout among young voters (18–29), which was also the highest (after 2018) since the 1970s, and helped Democrats, even as Republicans turned out in greater numbers; for example, youth and Latino voters turnout in a battleground state like Arizona was historically high. According to the Edison Research National Election Pool, the youth vote for the House was 63–35 in favor of Democrats. Pollster Antonio Arellano commented that young voters were the only age group in which more than 50 percent of voters supported Democrats.

== Milestones ==
Arkansas, Massachusetts, and New York elected female governors for the first time, and Arkansas and Massachusetts became the first states in which women concurrently served as governor and lieutenant governor. Alabama elected its first female senator, California elected a Latino senator for the first time, and Maryland elected its first African-American governor. Markwayne Mullin became the first Native American to represent Oklahoma in the Senate since Robert Latham Owen retired in 1925. In Florida, Maxwell Frost became the first member of Generation Z elected to the House. Marcy Kaptur's reelection made her the longest-serving woman in Congress following the completion of her term. Becca Balint became the first female member of Congress from Vermont—the last of the 50 states to elect a woman to Congress—and Summer Lee became the first black woman from Pennsylvania elected to Congress.

The 2022 election was the first time that LGBTQ candidates appeared on the general election ballot in all 50 states and Washington, D.C. With their respective victories, Tina Kotek of Oregon and Maura Healey of Massachusetts became the first openly lesbian state governors. James Roesener, elected to the New Hampshire House of Representatives, became the first transgender man to win a state legislative seat.

== Election night television viewership ==
Legend

Cable news network
Broadcast network

Total television viewers
8:00 to 11:00 p.m. Eastern

| Network | Viewers |
|---|---|
| Fox News Channel | 7,422,000 |
| ABC | 3,307,000 |
| MSNBC | 3,210,001 |
| NBC | 3,107,000 |
| CNN | 2,608,000 |
| CBS | 2,561,000 |
| Fox Business | 629,000 |
| Newsmax | 572,000 |
| CNBC | 103,000 |
| NewsNation | 93,000 |

== See also ==
- Party divisions of United States Congresses
- Political polarization in the United States
- Red states and blue states
