= 2021 United States gubernatorial elections =

- November 2, 2021; September 14 (California recall)

3 governorships (Note: including a recall election in California.)
	Majority party	Minority party
Party	Republican	Democratic
Seats before	27	23
Seats after	28	22
Seat change	▲1	▼1
Popular vote	2,918,691 (Note: This excludes the result of the 2021 California gubernatorial recall election, where voters were asked whether to keep or recall Gavin Newsom instead of voting for him or a different candidate.)	2,939,475
Percentage	49.43%	49.79%
Seats up	0	3
Seats won	1	2
- Map of the results Democratic hold Republican gain No election

United States gubernatorial elections were held on November 2, 2021, in two states, New Jersey and Virginia, and a recall election was held in California on September 14. These elections form part of the 2021 United States elections. The last gubernatorial elections for New Jersey and Virginia were in 2017, and the last regular gubernatorial election for California was in 2018. Going into the elections, all three seats were held by Democrats.

In Virginia, term-limited incumbent Ralph Northam was succeeded by Republican businessman Glenn Youngkin. In New Jersey, incumbent Phil Murphy won re-election. In California, an unsuccessful special election to recall incumbent Gavin Newsom was held on September 14, 2021. This was the first time since 1981 that every regular gubernatorial election in this cycle was won by single digits, and the first time since 1977 that Democrats won in New Jersey and Republicans won in Virginia at the same time.

As of 2026, this is the last time that Republicans won the governorship in Virginia.

== Election predictions ==
Several sites and individuals published predictions of competitive seats. These predictions looked at factors such as the strength of the incumbent (if the incumbent is running for re-election), the strength of the candidates, and the partisan leanings of the state (reflected in part by the state's Cook Partisan Voting Index rating). The predictions assigned ratings to each seat, with the rating indicating a party's predicted advantage in winning that seat.

Most election predictors use:

- "tossup": no advantage
- "tilt" (used by some predictors): advantage that is not quite as strong as "lean"
- "lean": slight advantage
- "likely": significant, but surmountable, advantage
- "safe" or "solid": near-certain chance of victory

State	PVI	Incumbent	Last race	Cook October 5, 2021	IE November 1, 2021	Sabato November 1 2021	Result
California	D+14	Gavin Newsom (recall)	61.95% D	Likely D	Likely D	Likely D	Newsom; 61.88% D
New Jersey	D+6	Phil Murphy	56.03% D	Solid D	Solid D	Likely D	Murphy; 51.22% D
Virginia	D+2	Ralph Northam (term-limited)	53.90% D	Tossup	Tossup	Lean R (flip)	Youngkin; 50.58% R (flip)

== Race summary ==
State	Incumbent	Party	First elected	Result	Candidates
California (recall)	Gavin Newsom	Democratic	2018	Recall failed.	✗ No 61.9%; Yes 38.1%
New Jersey	Phil Murphy	Democratic	2017	Incumbent re-elected.	▌ ✓ Phil Murphy (Democratic) 51.2%; ▌Jack Ciattarelli (Republican) 48.0%
Virginia	Ralph Northam	Democratic	2017	Incumbent term-limited. Republican gain.	▌ ✓ Glenn Youngkin (Republican) 50.6%; ▌Terry McAuliffe (Democratic) 48.6%

== Closest races ==
States where the margin of victory was under 5%:

1. Virginia, 1.94%
2. New Jersey, 3.22%

Blue denotes states won by Democrats. Red denotes states won by Republicans.

== California (recall) ==
2021 California gubernatorial recall election
- September 14, 2021
- Turnout: 58.45% (▼4.83 pp)
- Vote on recall
- Shall Gavin Newsom be recalled (removed) from the office of Governor?

Results
Choice	Votes	%
Yes	4,894,474	38.12%
No	7,944,092	61.88%
Valid votes	12,838,566	100.00%
Invalid or blank votes	0	0.00%
Total votes	12,838,566	100.00%
Registered voters/turnout	22,057,154	58.45%
- No: 50–60% 60–70% 70–80% 80–90% >90% Yes: 50–60% 60–70% 70–80% 80–90%
- Replacement candidates

If Newsom is recalled, who should replace him as governor?
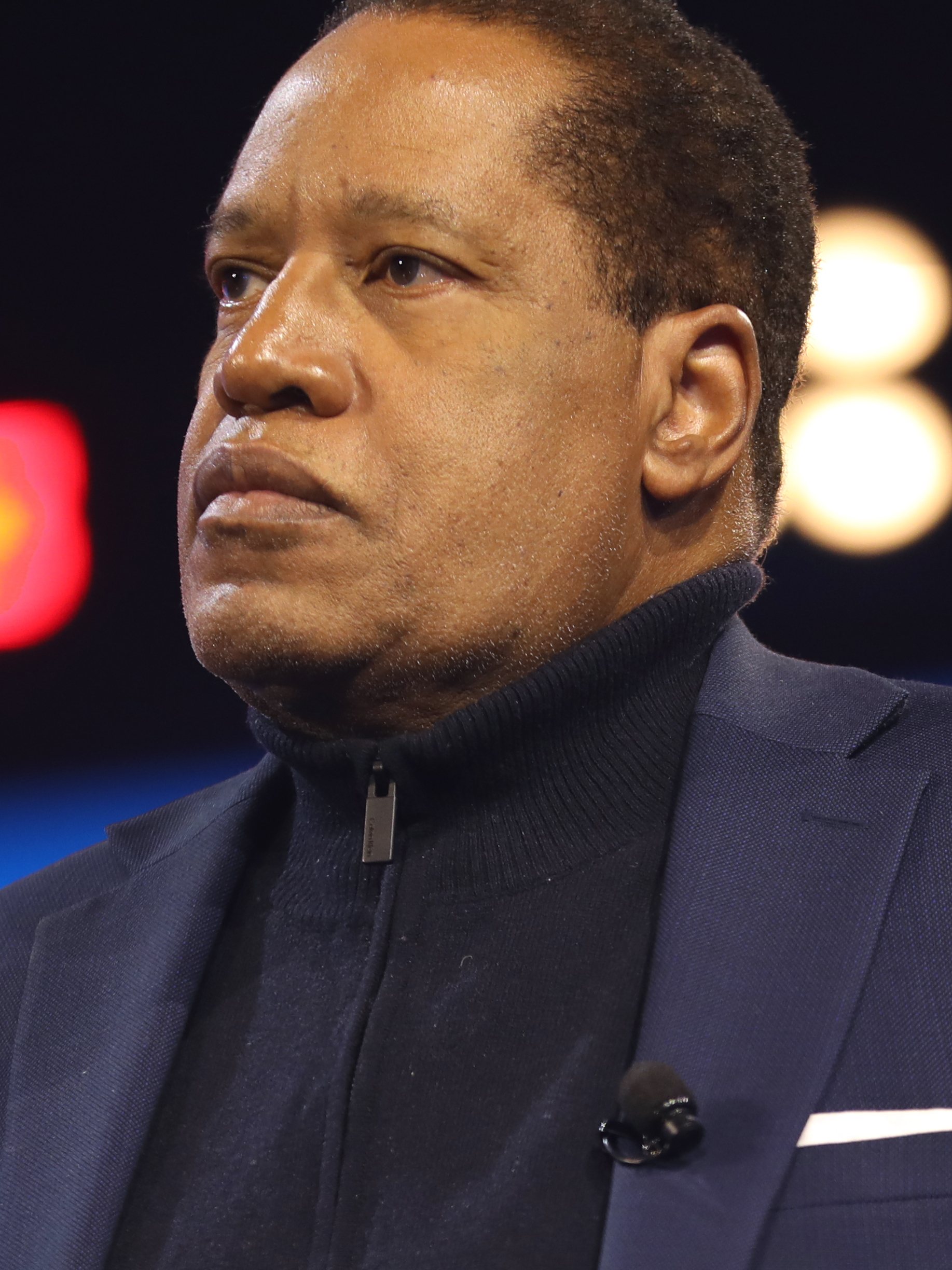

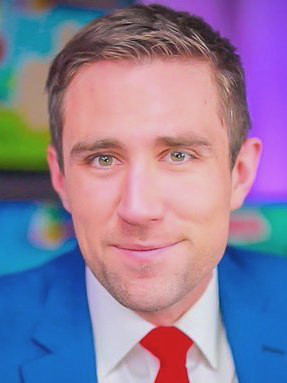

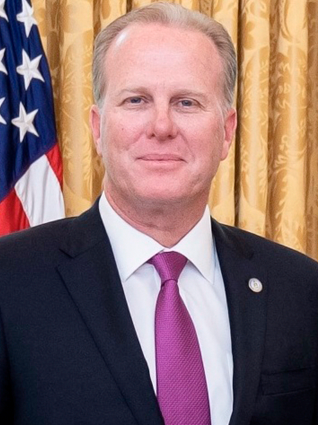

Candidate	Larry Elder	Kevin Paffrath
Party	Republican	Democratic
Popular vote	3,563,867	706,778
Percentage	48.4%	9.6%
Candidate	Kevin Faulconer	Brandon Ross
Party	Republican	Democratic
Popular vote	590,346	392,029
Percentage	8.0%	5.3%
- Elder: 20–30% 30–40% 40–50% 50–60% 60–70% Paffrath: 20–30%

Governor Gavin Newsom was elected in 2018 with 61.9% of the vote. In 2020 and 2021, a recall petition gained momentum due to the COVID-19 pandemic in California and Newsom's responses, eventually triggering a recall election. The ballot featured two questions, whether to recall Newsom and who would have replaced him if he had been recalled. Newsom was ineligible to run as a candidate for the second question.

The election was the fourth gubernatorial recall election in American history and the second in state history after the 2003 recall election, which resulted in the successful recall of Governor Gray Davis, who was replaced with Arnold Schwarzenegger.

A large number of candidates announced their intention to replace Newsom. Among the most prominent Republicans in the race included 2018 Republican nominee John H. Cox, former San Diego mayor Kevin Faulconer, media personalities Caitlyn Jenner and Larry Elder, in addition to former U.S. representative Doug Ose.

The recall failed, and thus Newsom remained in office for the rest of his term, which expired on January 2, 2023.

== New Jersey ==
New Jersey election
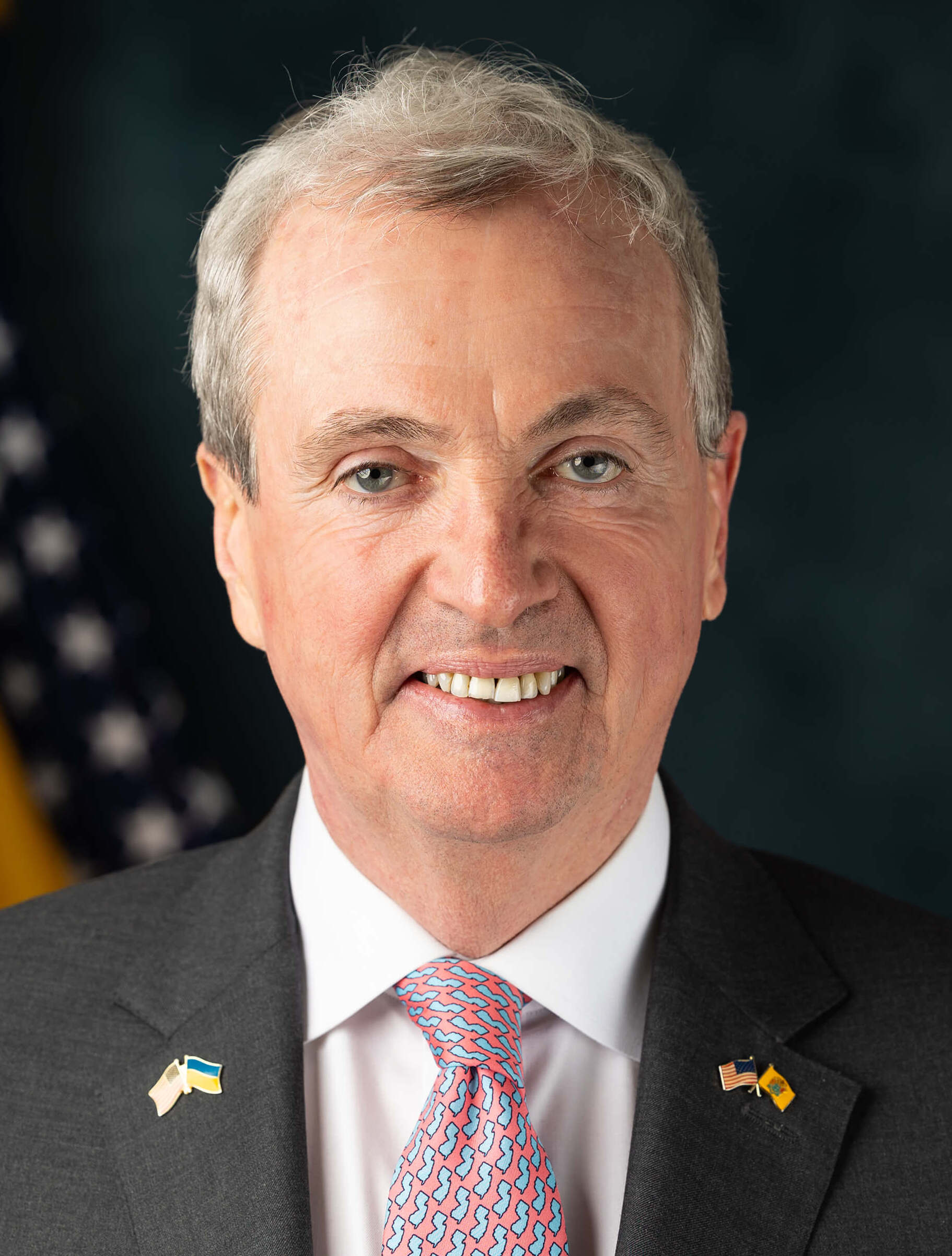

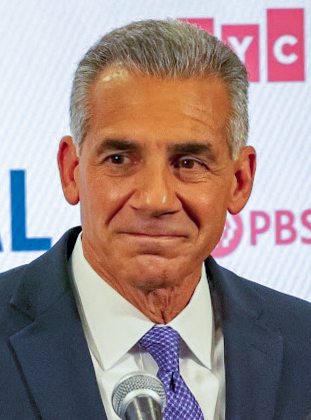
Nominee	Phil Murphy	Jack Ciattarelli
Party	Democratic	Republican
Running mate	Sheila Oliver	Diane Allen
Popular vote	1,339,471	1,255,185
Percentage	51.22%	48.00%
- County results
Governor before election
Phil Murphy
Democratic
Elected Governor
Phil Murphy
Democratic

Governor Phil Murphy was elected in 2017 with 56% of the vote. He ran for re-election to a second term and was unopposed in the Democratic primary.

Republican Jack Ciattarelli was the earliest to announce his candidacy for the governorship in February 2018. He was followed by New Jersey Republican Party chairman Doug Steinhardt, who announced his campaign in December 2020 and withdrew his candidacy the next month. Pastor Phil Rizzo and businessman Hirsh Singh ran for the nomination. Ciattarelli won the Republican primary.

The Libertarian Party announced activist Gregg Mele as their nominee in March. The Green Party nominated their candidate Madelyn Hoffman at a convention in April. Other minor candidates included Socialist Workers Party nominee Joanne Kuniansky and perennial candidate Ed Forchion of the Legalize Marijuana Party who ran as a write-in after challenges to signatures from the Murphy campaign.

Murphy won re-election after several media outlets called the race for him over Ciattarelli on November 3, 2021. Murphy's close election was surprising given he had the lead in every poll leading up to the election day. Moreover, Murphy trailed Ciattarelli from early voting at the start of the ballot count, taking the lead early Wednesday morning.

Democratic primary results
Party	Candidate	Votes	%
Democratic	Philip Murphy (incumbent)	382,984	100.00
Total votes		382,984	100.00

Republican primary results
Party	Candidate	Votes	%
Republican	Jack Ciattarelli	167,690	49.46
Republican	Philip Rizzo	87,007	25.66
Republican	Hirsh V. Singh	73,155	21.58
Republican	Brian D. Levine	11,181	3.30
Total votes		339,033	100.00

2021 New Jersey gubernatorial election
Party	Candidate	Votes	%	±%
Democratic	Phil Murphy (incumbent); Sheila Oliver (incumbent)	1,339,471	51.22%	−4.81
Republican	Jack Ciattarelli; Diane Allen	1,255,185	48.00%	+6.11
Green	Madelyn R. Hoffman; Heather Warburton	8,450	0.32%	−0.15
Libertarian	Gregg Mele; Eveline Brownstein	7,768	0.30%	−0.19
Socialist Workers	Joanne Kuniansky; Vivian Sahner	4,012	0.15%	N/A
Total votes		2,614,886	100.00%	
Democratic hold				

== Virginia ==
Virginia election
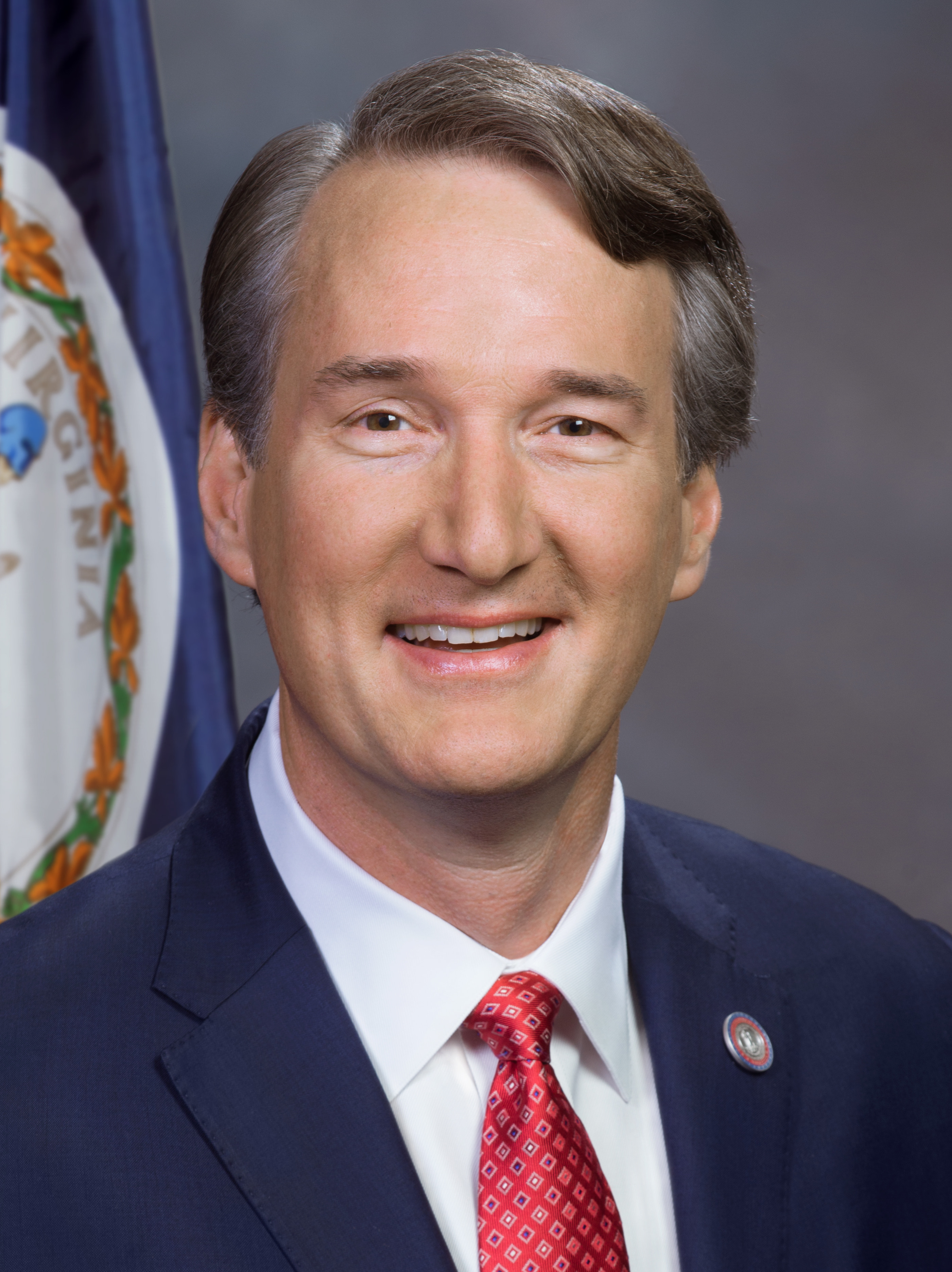

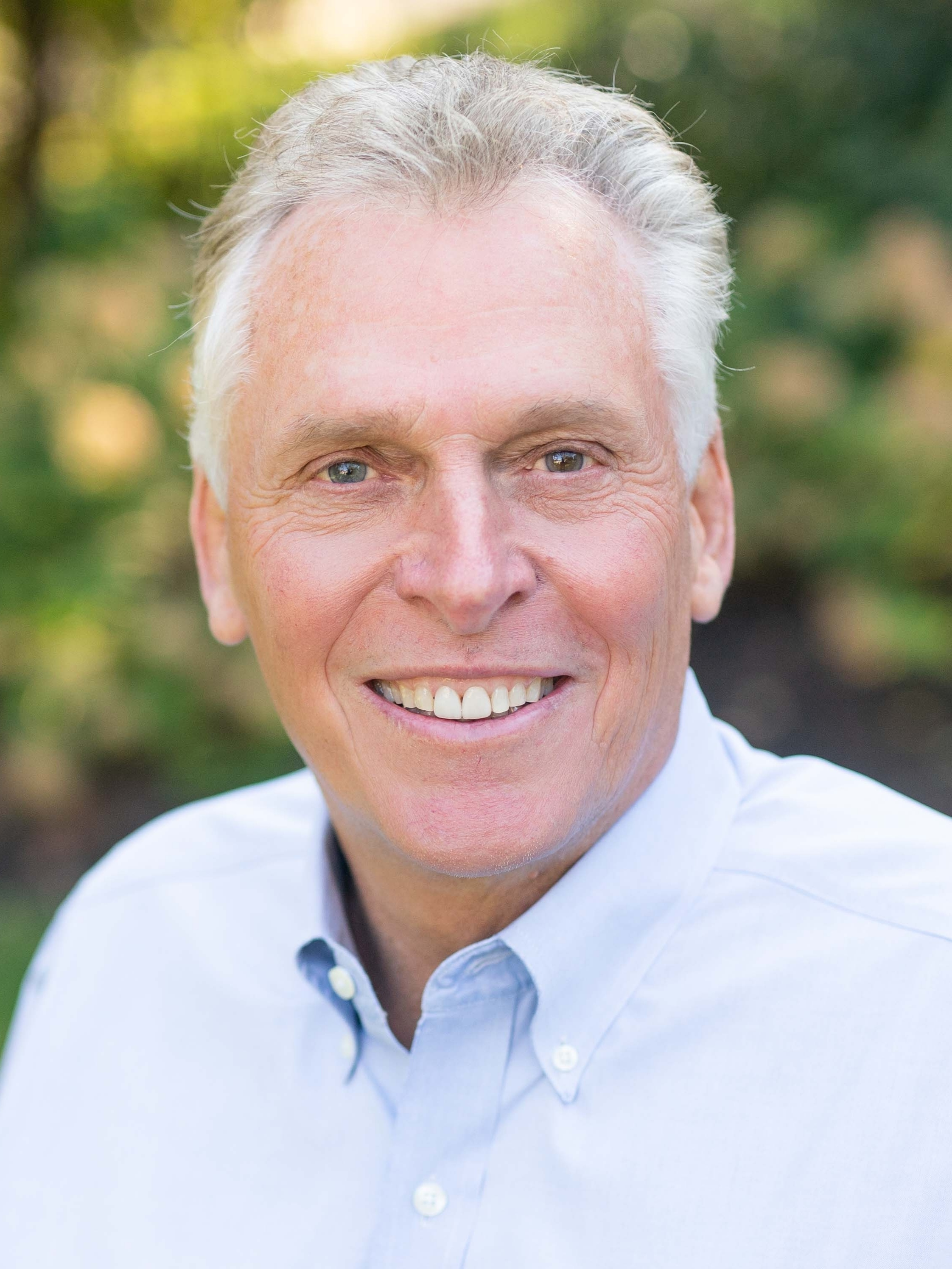
Nominee	Glenn Youngkin	Terry McAuliffe
Party	Republican	Democratic
Popular vote	1,663,158	1,599,470
Percentage	50.58%	48.64%
- County and independent city results
Governor before election
Ralph Northam
Democratic
Elected Governor
Glenn Youngkin
Republican

Governor Ralph Northam was elected in 2017 with 53.9% of the vote. He was term-limited in 2021, as the Virginia Constitution does not allow governors to serve consecutive terms.

Lieutenant Governor Justin Fairfax, former governor of Virginia Terry McAuliffe, state senator Jennifer McClellan, state delegate Jennifer Carroll Foy, and state delegate Lee Carter announced their candidacies for the Democratic nomination for the governorship. Virginia attorney general Mark Herring previously announced his intention to run for the governorship but withdrew from the race to seek reelection as attorney general. McAuliffe won the Democratic primary by a wide margin despite the large field of candidates.

State senator Amanda Chase announced her candidacy for the Republican nomination for the governorship in February 2020. After initially indicating a brief attempt at an independent run because of the state Republicans' decision to hold a convention instead of a primary, Chase later returned to seek her party's nomination once more. Kirk Cox, the former Republican speaker of the Virginia House of Delegates, filed the paperwork to run for the governorship in September 2020. Businessman Glenn Youngkin won the Republican nomination after six rounds of voting at the convention.

Princess Blanding, a teacher and sister of the late Marcus-David Peters, was the newly-founded Liberation Party's gubernatorial candidate.

In the general election on November 2, Republican Glenn Youngkin defeated Democrat and former Governor Terry McAuliffe, making him the first Republican to win a statewide election in Virginia since 2009. Republicans also flipped the lieutenant governor, attorney general and House of Delegates races that were held concurrently.

Democratic primary results
Party	Candidate	Votes	%
Democratic	Terry McAuliffe	307,367	62.10
Democratic	Jennifer Carroll Foy	98,052	19.81
Democratic	Jennifer McClellan	58,213	11.76
Democratic	Justin Fairfax	17,606	3.56
Democratic	Lee J. Carter	13,694	2.77
Total votes		494,932	100.00

Virginia GOP Convention, Governor Nominee
Candidate	Round 1		Round 2		Round 3		Round 4		Round 5		Round 6	
Candidate	Votes	%	Votes	%	Votes	%	Votes	%	Votes	%	Votes	%
Glenn Youngkin	4131.80	32.9%	4140.55	33.0%	4148.91	33.0%	4331.93	34.5%	5311.43	42.3%	6869.22	54.7%
Pete Snyder	3241.61	25.8%	3243.84	25.8%	3249.71	25.9%	3502.91	27.9%	4078.25	32.5%	5684.78	45.3%
Amanda Chase	2605.89	20.8%	2611.54	20.8%	2619.83	20.9%	2859.39	22.8%	3164.32	25.2%	Eliminated	
Kirk Cox	1693.58	13.5%	1698.13	13.5%	1705.90	13.6%	1859.77	14.8%	Eliminated			
Sergio de la Peña	805.35	6.4%	812.44	6.5%	829.65	6.6%	Eliminated					
Peter Doran	42.28	0.3%	47.50	0.4%	Eliminated							
Octavia Johnson	33.48	0.3%	Eliminated									

2021 Virginia gubernatorial election
Party	Candidate	Votes	%	±%
Republican	Glenn Youngkin	1,663,158	50.58%	+5.61
Democratic	Terry McAuliffe	1,599,470	48.64%	−5.26
Liberation	Princess Blanding	23,107	0.70%	N/A
Write-in		2,592	0.08%	+0.03
Total votes		3,288,327	100.00%	N/A
Republican gain from Democratic				
