= 2021 North Miami mayoral election =

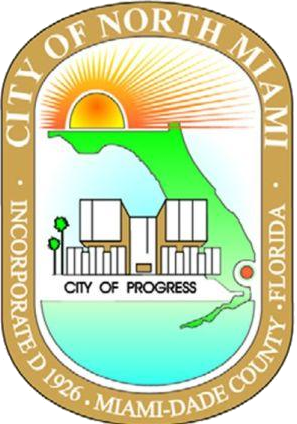
- May 11, 2021
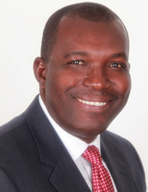

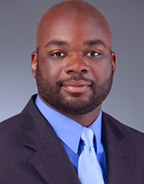
Candidate	Philippe Bien-Aime	Michael Etienne
Party	Nonpartisan	Nonpartisan
Popular vote	3,334	1,887
Percentage	63.86%	36.14%
Mayor before election
Philippe Bien-Aime
Nonpartisan
Elected mayor
Philippe Bien-Aime
Nonpartisan

The 2021 North Miami mayoral election took place on May 11, 2021. Incumbent Mayor Philippe Bien-Aime ran for re-election to a second term. He was challenged by Michael Etienne, the former city clerk. During the campaign, Etienne attacked Bien-Aime for fiscal irresponsibility and argued that it was "absolutely imperative" to rein in the city's budget deficit, while Bien-Aime attacked Etienne for mismanagement of the city clerk's office. Bien-Aime ultimately defeated Etienne in a landslide, winning 64 percent of the vote to Etienne's 36 percent.

Bien-Aime would not end up serving out his full term as Mayor. In 2022, he unsuccessfully ran for the County Commission, forcing him to resign as mayor under Florida's resign-to-run law.

== General election ==
=== Candidates ===
- Philippe Bien-Aime, incumbent Mayor
- Michael Etienne, former City Clerk

=== Results ===
2021 North Miami mayoral election results
Party	Candidate	Votes	%
Nonpartisan	Philippe Ben-Aime (inc.)	3,334	63.86%
Nonpartisan	Michael Etienne	1,887	36.14%
Total votes		5,221	100.00%
