= 2021 Dallas municipal election =

2021 Dallas City Council election
- May 1, 2021

The 2021 Dallas City Council election determined all 14 city council members in Dallas, Texas. The election occurred on May 1, 2021. By law, Dallas municipal elections are nonpartisan. In races where no candidate took a majority of over 50% of the total vote, the two top vote-earners advanced to a runoff election. Due to term limits, council members are limited to serving four consecutive terms (eight years).

A runoff election for districts 2, 4, 7, 11, 13, and 14 was held on June 5, 2021. Early voting began Monday, May 24, 2021, and ended on Tuesday, June 1, 2021.

== Incumbents ==
| District | Incumbent | Took office | Term-limited |
|---|---|---|---|
| 1 | Chad West | 2019 | |
| 2 | Adam Medrano† | 2013 | check |
| 3 | Casey Thomas, II‡ | 2015 | |
| 4 | Carolyn King Arnold | 2018 | |
| 5 | Jaime Resendez | 2019 | |
| 6 | Omar Narvaez | 2017 | |
| 7 | Adam Bazaldua | 2019 | |
| 8 | Tennell Atkins | 2017 | |
| 9 | Paula Blackmon | 2019 | |
| 10 | Adam McGough | 2015 | |
| 11 | Lee Kleinman | 2013 | check |
| 12 | Cara Mendelsohn | 2019 | |
| 13 | Jennifer S. Gates | 2013 | check |
| 14 | David Blewett | 2019 | |

† Denotes Deputy Mayor Pro Tem ‡ Denotes Mayor Pro Tem

== Results ==
Six of the fourteen races did not have a majority vote for one candidate. The top two vote-earners in these districts advanced to a runoff.

| District | Result |
|---|---|
| 1 | Chad West (I) (52.07%) |
| 2 | Jesse Moreno† (57.51%) (runoff) |
| 3 | Casey Thomas (I) (82.12%) |
| 4 | Carolyn King Arnold (I) (54.96%) (runoff) |
| 5 | Jaime Resendez (I) (51.72%) |
| 6 | Omar Narvaez (I) (56.15%) |
| 7 | Adam Bazaldua (I) (63.59%) (runoff) |
| 8 | Tennell Atkins (I) (73.58%) |
| 9 | Paula Blackmon (I) (63.09%) |
| 10 | Adam McGough (I) (90.9%) |
| 11 | Jaynie Schultz† (53.93%) (runoff) |
| 12 | Cara Mendelsohn (I) (81.45%) |
| 13 | Gay Donnell Willis† (53.51%) (runoff) |
| 14 | Paul Ridley‡ (60.58%) (runoff) |

† Denotes new member elected ‡ Denotes incumbent defeated

== Candidates ==
This section lists persons who had announced their intent to seek election. To appear on the ballot, candidates had to file by February 12, 2021, at 5:00 PM.

=== District 1 ===
Candidates
| Candidate | Experience | Website | Endorsements |
|---|---|---|---|
| Stephani A. "Skyle" Kyle | Marketing executive | | |
| Gerardo Sánchez | | | |
| Giovanni (Gio) Valderas | Artist and arts center manager | | Organizations: Our Revolution North Texas; Sunrise Movement Dallas |
| Chad West | District 1 incumbent | | Organizations: The Real Estate Council PAC |

=== District 2 ===
Candidates
| Candidate | Experience | Website | Endorsements | Advanced to runoff |
|---|---|---|---|---|
| Raha Assadi | Lawyer | | | |
| Jennifer Cortez | Ford community relations specialist, immigrant rights advocacy group co-founder | | | |
| Michael Fetzer | | | | |
| Jesse Moreno | Former member of the Dallas Park Board | | Our Revolution Texas; Sunrise Movement Dallas; Black American Futures PAC | check |
| Sana Syed | Former director of the City of Dallas Public Information Office; human rights advocacy group founder; and Exec. VP of Community Outreach and Development for Nicholas Residential | | | check |

==== Withdrawn ====
- Jonas Park

==== Not qualified ====
- Rene Yanez

=== District 3 ===
Candidates
| Candidate | Occupation | Website |
|---|---|---|
| Irby Foster | Maintenance company owner and facilities manager Former City of Dallas Senior Facilities Manager and DCCC Energy Management Associate Director | |
| Casey Thomas, II | District 3 incumbent | |

=== District 4 ===
Candidates
| Candidate | Occupation | Website | Endorsements | Advanced to runoff |
|---|---|---|---|---|
| Johnny Aguinaga | Homeless rights activist and home builder | | | |
| Carolyn King Arnold | District 4 incumbent | | | check |
| Matthew Canto | Property management company Director of Operations | | | |
| Maxie Johnson | Dallas Independent School District trustee | | Black American Futures PAC; Texas Working Families Party | check |
| Lelani Russell | Activist | | | |

=== District 5 ===
Candidates
| Candidate | Occupation | Website |
|---|---|---|
| Terry Perkins | Pastor | |
| Jaime Resendez | District 5 incumbent | |
| Ruth Torres | HR consultant | |
| Yolanda "Faye" Williams | Paralegal, former Dallas Park Board member | |

==== Not qualified ====
- Sarah G. CC Anderson

=== District 6 ===
Candidates
| Candidate | Occupation | Website |
|---|---|---|
| Monica R. Alonzo | Former city councilor | |
| Tony Carrillo | Construction manager | |
| Wendi Macon | Charter school external affairs employee | |
| Omar Narvaez | District 6 incumbent | |
| Earl D. Thomas | Pastor and mime | |

=== District 7 ===
Candidates
| Candidate | Occupation | Website | Endorsements | Advanced to runoff |
|---|---|---|---|---|
| Adam Bazaldua | District 7 incumbent | | Black American Futures PAC; Dallas Morning News; Our Revolution Texas; Sunrise Movement Dallas; Texas Working Families Party | check |
| Tramonica Brown | Social activist | | | |
| Kevin Felder | Real estate broker, former city councilor | | | check |
| Walter "Changa" Higgins | Activist | | | |
| Calvin D. Johnson | Lawyer | | | |
| Donald Parish | Pastor | | | |
| James JT Turknett | Pastor | | | |
| Israel Varela | Realtor | | | |

=== District 8 ===
Candidates
| Candidate | Occupation | Website |
|---|---|---|
| Tennell Atkins | District 8 incumbent | |
| Subrina Lynn Brenham | Beauty supply store and tax services owner, activist | |
| Lakolya London | Activist | |
| Davante "Shawt" Peters | Activist, musician/rapper | |

==== Not qualified ====
- Melissa Rose Williams

=== District 9 ===
Candidates
| Candidate | Occupation | Website |
|---|---|---|
| Paula Blackmon | District 9 incumbent | |
| John Botefuhr | Chiropractor, chiropractic clinic owner | |
| Judy Kumar | Project manager | |

=== District 10 ===
Candidates
| Candidate | Occupation | Website |
|---|---|---|
| Sirrano Keith Baldeo | Owner of Dallas Pulse News | |
| B. Adam McGough | District 10 incumbent | |

=== District 11 ===
Candidates
| Candidate | Occupation | Website | Endorsements | Advanced to runoff |
|---|---|---|---|---|
| Candy Evans | Real estate writer | | | |
| Jaynie Schultz | Dallas Urban Design Advisory Committee chair, City Lab High School board chair, former Dallas City Plan commissioner | | Dallas Morning News | check |
| Barry Wernick | Lawyer | | | check |
| Hosanna Yemiru | Political organizer | | Run For Something; Working Families Party; Sunrise Movement Dallas | |

=== District 12 ===
Candidates
| Candidate | Occupation | Website |
|---|---|---|
| Elva Curl | Former employee of the Office of U.S. Senator John Cornyn, former City of Dallas employee | |
| Cara Mendelsohn | Incumbent | |

=== District 13 ===
Candidates
| Candidate | Occupation | Website | Advanced to runoff |
|---|---|---|---|
| Da'on Boulanger-Chatman | Educator | | |
| Leland R. Burk | Real estate executive, banker, and investor; Dallas Arts and Culture Advisory commissioner | | check |
| Ryan M. Moore | Tax attorney | | |
| Mac Smith | DART Civil and Environmental Engineer | | |
| Gay Donnell Willis | President & CEO of the Turtle Creek Conservancy, former Dallas Community Development Commissioner | | check |

=== District 14 ===
Candidates
| Candidate | Occupation | Website | Advanced to runoff |
|---|---|---|---|
| David Blewett | District 14 incumbent | | check |
| Paul E. Ridley | Lawyer | | check |
| Elizabeth Viney | Lawyer | | |
