= 2021 Springfield, Missouri, mayoral election =

- April 6, 2021

Nominee	Ken McClure	Marcus Aton
Party	Nonpartisan	Nonpartisan
Popular vote	10,250	5,341
Percentage	67.47%	32.53%

Springfield, Missouri held an election for mayor on April 6, 2021. Incumbent mayor Ken McClure was challenged by opponent Marcus Aton. McClure was re-elected mayor by a margin of 34.94 percentage points. Springfield mayoral elections are nonpartisan and candidates are not affiliated with a specific party on ballots.

== Background ==
McClure first became mayor of Springfield in 2017, taking the place of incumbent mayor Bob Stevens. McClure previously served as a member of the Springfield City Council beginning in 2015 and was chief of staff to former governor Matt Blunt from 2004 to 2006 and was vice president of Missouri State University until his retirement in 2015. McClure was challenged by marketer Marcus Aton who was campaigning alongside his brother Alexander, who was running for council member for General Seat A in the city council.

== Campaign ==
Aton criticized McClure's and the city's handling of COVID-19, arguing that stay-at-home orders and capacity limitations, as well as mask mandates were hurting the city, while McClure noted that a majority of Springfield residents supported the mandates. He also criticized McClure for the rise in crime the city had seen during his terms as mayor. Aton himself was questioned about his eligibility for running for mayor as a letter was sent to the county clerk stating Aton and his brother had not been living in the city long enough to qualify for positions, showing tax returns from 2019 and 2020 had listed their address in nearby Rogersville. Aton denied the claims.

McClure went on to a substantial win over Aton by more than a 2–1 margin, thus securing his third term as mayor.

== Results ==
2021 Springfield Mayoral Race
Party	Candidate	Votes	%
Nonpartisan	Ken McClure (Inc.)	10,250	67.47
Nonpartisan	Marcus Aton	5,341	32.53
Total votes		15,591	100.00
