= 2021 Cedar Rapids mayoral election =

2021 Cedar Rapids, mayoral election
- November 2, 2021; November 30, 2021 (runoff)
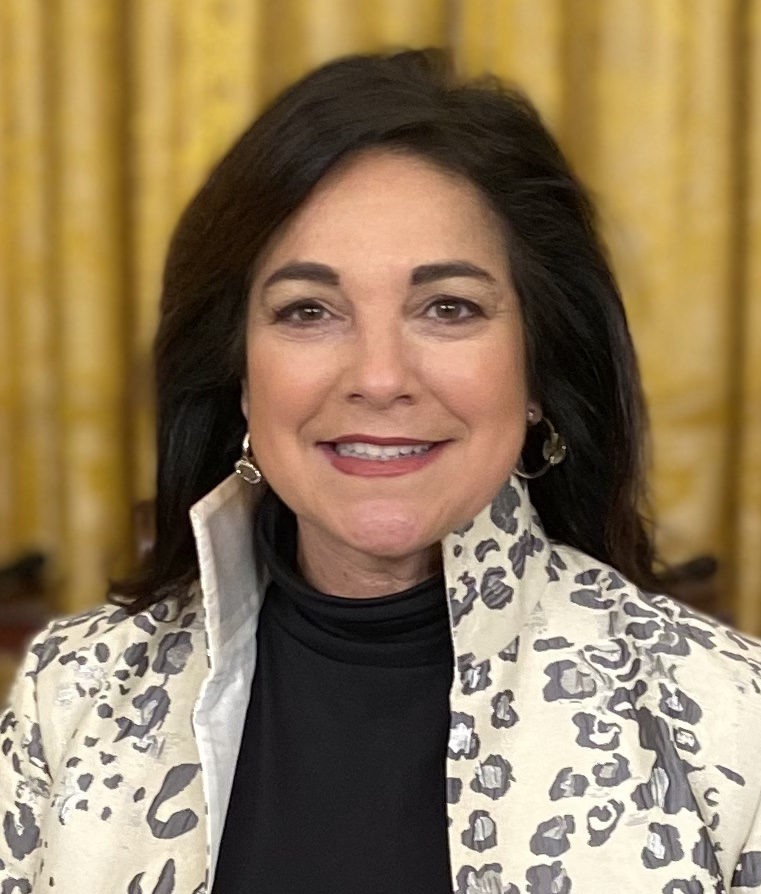
Candidate	Tiffany O'Donnell	Amara Andrews	Brad Hart
Party	Republican	Democratic	Nonpartisan
Alliance			Republican
First-round	11,023; 42.2%	7,359; 28.2%	7,319; 28.1%
Runoff	13,479; 67.9%	6,358; 32.1%	Eliminated
Mayor before election
Brad Hart
Elected mayor
Tiffany O'Donnell

The 2021 Cedar Rapids mayoral election was held on November 2, 2021, with a subsequent runoff election held on November 30, 2021. The first round of the election futured three major candidates. Candidate Tiffany O'Donnell strongly led the first round, with candidate Amara Andrews finishing in second place. Incumbent mayor Brad Hart failed to advance to the runoff, narrowly finishing behind Andrews. In the runoff election, O'Donnell handily won the election, winning more than twice as many votes as Andrews.

Although Cedar Rapids municipal elections are officially nonpartisan on the ballot, candidates could still state their political affiliation on filings or self-identify with a party.

== General election ==
=== Candidates ===
==== Advanced to runoff ====
- Tiffany O'Donnell, leader of Iowa Women Lead Change, former news anchor (Republican)
- Amara Andrews, leader of Advocates for Social Justice (Democrat)

==== Eliminated ====
- Brad Hart, incumbent mayor of Cedar Rapids (2018–2022) (Non-affiliated)
- Myra Colby Bradwell (The Peoples Party)

=== Results ===
2021 Cedar Rapids mayoral election
Party	Candidate	Votes	%
Nonpartisan	Tiffany O'Donnell	11,023	42.2%
Nonpartisan	Amara Andrews	7,359	28.2%
Nonpartisan	Brad Hart (incumbent)	7,319	28.1%
Nonpartisan	Maya Colby Bradwell	412	1.6%
Total votes		26,113	100.0%

== Runoff election ==
=== Results ===
2021 Cedar Rapids mayoral runoff election
Party	Candidate	Votes	%
Nonpartisan	Tiffany O'Donnell	13,479	67.9%
Nonpartisan	Amara Andrews	6,358	32.1%
Total votes		20,811	100.0%
