= Kevin Paffrath =

American YouTuber and landlord (born 1992)

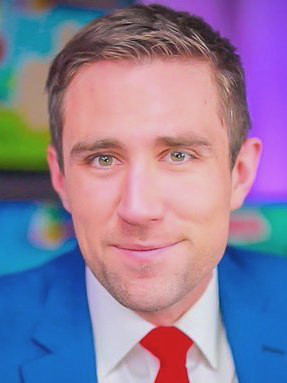
- Paffrath in 2021
- Born: January 28, 1992 (age 34); Germany
- Education: Ventura College; University of California, Los Angeles (BA)
- Years active: 2010–present
- Political party: Democratic
- Spouse: Lauren Stewart
- Children: 7

YouTube information
- Channel: @MeetKevin
- Years active: 2010–present
- Genres: Real estate, finance
- Subscribers: 2.04 million
- Views: 746 million
- Last updated: November 5, 2025
- Website: www.meetkevin.com

Kevin Paffrath (born January 28, 1992), also known as Meet Kevin, is an American YouTuber, landlord, real estate broker, and entrepreneur. He has been a licensed investment advisor since September 2022 but states that he does not give personalized financial advice through his videos. In 2019, he was described by Curbed as a "landlord influencer". Paffrath was a Democratic candidate to replace fellow Democrat Gavin Newsom in the unsuccessful 2021 California gubernatorial recall election, winning 9.6% of the vote.

== Personal life ==
Paffrath was born in Germany on January 28, 1992. His parents immigrated from Wuppertal to the United States when he was 18 months old, and his parents divorced when he was six years old. As a teenager, Paffrath initially wanted to work in law enforcement, and participated in a law enforcement explorer program, in which he rode along with police officers and learned about the career. While on a high school trip to Paris, Paffrath met his future wife, Lauren Stewart. In the summer before his senior year of high school, Paffrath moved to California to live with Lauren and her family, while finishing high school at Buena High School. Lauren's parents worked in real estate, and Paffrath became interested in the field.

Paffrath attended Ventura College, and then the University of California, Los Angeles. At UCLA, he studied economics, accounting, and political science.

Kevin and Lauren Paffrath have two sons, two twin daughters, and triplets (two identical girls and one boy). The last 5 were carried by surrogate. Lauren, who began to manage properties when she was 18 years old, works as a property manager for The Paffrath Organization. As of May 2021, the Paffraths live in Ventura, California.

== Career ==
Paffrath earned his real estate license in 2010 and the same year purchased a condemned house with his future wife and fixed it up. They then began renovating additional homes and renting them out. Paffrath and his wife Lauren own the real estate business The Paffrath Organization, through which they buy, renovate, and rent properties in southern California. In 2017 they began to offer construction services through their organization but ended the venture 18 months later after losing $1 million, which Paffrath attributed to narrow cost margins not allowing room for error. As of May 2021, Paffrath and his wife reportedly owned 22 properties, including one in which they live.

Paffrath started his YouTube channel, Meet Kevin, in September 2010. The channel reached 1 million subscribers in December 2020 and had over 1.7 million as of September 2021. His videos have discussed topics including real estate, the stock market, COVID-19 stimulus checks, cryptocurrency, and airline points. Paffrath also teaches online courses on the Teachable platform.

Steven T. Wright publishing in the real estate website Curbed about "landlord influencers" included a profile of Paffrath. In the article, he described some of Paffrath's "arguably incendiary opinions on landlord-tenant relations", including Paffrath's requirement that his tenants have a credit score of 700 or higher, and his advice that property owners should mislead tenants by concealing the fact that they own the property, or are the sole owner.

In November 2020, Paffrath's channel and real estate career were featured on CNBC's Millennial Money, which publishes profiles of millennials and how they earn and spend their money. CNBC found that Paffrath earns most of his income from YouTube advertising revenue and affiliate programs, not real estate or stock market investing. Paffrath was among a group of finance YouTubers profiled by Adlan Jackson in a March 2021 New York Times Magazine article, which discussed their shift during the COVID-19 pandemic from offering advice on becoming multimillionaires towards creating videos to provide "any little update" on stimulus payments. In the article, Jackson said that Paffrath was "exceptionally talented at talking to a camera, a natural salesman", but also wrote that he was "a multimillionaire landlord who once extolled the virtues of misleading tenants and vigorously refusing to rent to people with suboptimal credit scores".

In August 2021, CNBC reported that Paffrath earned close to $10 million from YouTube over the last 12 months.

In November 2022, after the collapse of the FTX cryptocurrency exchange, Paffrath posted an apology video in which he claimed he was paid $2,500 every time he mentioned FTX in one of his videos. He believed he had one of the smaller deals and claimed other influencers had six-figure deals with the exchange. In a telephone interview with MarketWatch from a cruise with family, he said, "If I could go back in time, I would undo it all in a heartbeat. We failed here. Everybody was fooled". Paffrath claimed the income from the FTX deal only accounted for three percent of his total income for the year. In an interview with the Wall Street Journal, he referred to this as a "scar" on him as an influencer.

On November 29, 2022, Paffrath launched "The Meet Kevin Pricing Power ETF" under ticker symbol $PP. The ETF was later closed by Paffrath in February 2025 following “performance woes and souring costs”. He also operates HouseHack.

== Legal issues ==
Ramsey Solutions, a media company, owned by finance personality Dave Ramsey, sued Paffrath in 2018. Ramsey alleged breach of contract, stealing trade secrets, and defamatory statements. Paffrath had posted videos critical of Ramsey and his business practices. One video was entitled "Dave Ramsey: Exposed" where Paffrath claimed Ramsey's business provided "cold-as-ice leads" for real estate sales and collected a fee for "doing nothing". Paffrath stated that he had ended his relationship with Ramsey Solutions before making the videos and believed he did not violate a contract. Paffrath also claimed the lawsuit was an attempt at censorship which violated his right to free speech. The case moved to federal court in 2019, and was settled privately out of court later that year. Paffrath's videos mentioned in the lawsuit are no longer on YouTube.

Paffrath made numerous YouTube videos criticizing the business model of real estate personality Grant Cardone. In an effort to bring more attention to his other videos, in 2018, Paffrath delivered flowers to Cardone's office staff while dressed as a Christmas elf, reportedly running through Cardone's offices. Paffrath was charged with trespassing and disorderly conduct, but the charges were later dismissed. In a May 2021 interview with KTXL discussing his gubernatorial candidacy, Paffrath expressed regret for the "YouTube prank" and said he had gotten "carried away with the entertainment aspect of YouTube".

Paffrath was amongst a number of finance YouTube stars who were sued in a class action lawsuit filed March 15, 2023 in the Southern District of Florida in relation to their alleged promotion of the cryptocurrency exchange FTX. The suit alleged that Kevin Paffrath amongst a number of other defendants “promoted, assisted in, and/or participated in” the sale of “unregistered securities” by FTX. Paffrath subsequently agreed the terms of a settlement for his part in the case, the details of which have not yet been disclosed.

== 2021 California gubernatorial candidacy ==
On May 17, 2021, Paffrath announced his candidacy as a Democrat in the 2021 California gubernatorial recall election, which was held on September 14, 2021, and ultimately resulted in sitting governor Gavin Newsom not being recalled. Paffrath was one of nine Democratic candidates to replace Newsom who qualified to appear on the ballot, out of 46 total candidates; the thin pool of Democrats was attributed to the California Democratic Party's strategy, which focused on defeating the recall and discouraged established Democratic candidates from entering the race.

Instagram briefly removed Paffrath's campaign announcement post from their platform. According to Paffrath, Instagram notified him that they had removed his post, in which he described Newsom as a "weanie baby", under its harassment guidelines. Paffrath told Fox News he suspected the post was taken down intentionally and that the removal was related to its parent company Facebook's donations to Newsom's causes. A Facebook spokesperson said the company's donations had gone towards coronavirus relief, not the governor's campaign. The Los Angeles Times has reported that such donations by Facebook and other social media companies were "behested" payments, or indirect payments to government causes on Newsom's behalf. Shortly after Fox News inquired about the removal of the post, it was restored, and a spokesperson said it had been removed in error.

Paffrath sued the Secretary of State of California to allow him to be listed on the ballot as "Kevin 'Meet Kevin' Paffrath". The court denied his petition on July 21, finding that "Meet Kevin" was nonetheless a brand and not a nickname or formal name.

In August 2021, Paffrath's attorneys sent a cease and desist letter to CNN related to their reporting that "no Democrats are competing against their own party's governor." Fox News reported the CNN article was subsequently revised to state, "no party-backed Democrats are competing against their own party's governor" and suggested CNN should have been aware of Paffrath from recent press coverage.

61.9% of voters opposed recalling Newsom. In the ballot question asking which candidate should replace Newsom if the recall was successful, Paffrath came in second place to Republican Larry Elder, with around 706,000 votes (9.6%) to Elder's 3.5 million (48.4%).
