= 1901 United States House of Representatives elections =

These are election results in 1901 to the United States House of Representatives:

== List of elections ==
District	Incumbent			This race	
District	Member	Party	First elected	Results	Candidates
Maine 4	Charles A. Boutelle	Republican	1882	Incumbent member-elect resigned during previous congress. New member elected April 8, 1901. Republican hold.	▌ ✓ Llewellyn Powers (Republican); [data missing]
Texas 6	Robert E. Burke	Democratic	1896	Incumbent died June 5, 1901. New member elected July 13, 1901. Democratic hold.	▌ ✓ Dudley G. Wooten (Democratic); [data missing]
Michigan 10	Rousseau O. Crump	Republican	1894	Incumbent died May 1, 1901. New member elected October 15, 1901. Republican hold.	▌ ✓ Henry H. Aplin (Republican); [data missing]
New York 24	Albert D. Shaw	Republican	1900 (special)	Incumbent member-elect died during previous congress. New member elected November 5, 1901. Republican hold.	▌ ✓ Charles L. Knapp (Republican); [data missing]
Pennsylvania 10	Marriott Brosius	Republican	1888	Incumbent died March 16, 1901. New member elected November 5, 1901. Republican hold.	▌ ✓ Henry B. Cassel (Republican); [data missing]
South Carolina 7	J. William Stokes	Democratic	1894	Incumbent died July 6, 1901. New member elected November 5, 1901 and seated December 2, 1901. Democratic hold. Winner was also elected the same day to the next term; see below.	▌ ✓ Asbury Francis Lever (Democratic); Unopposed
