= Farney =

Farney may refer to:

- Farney, Monaghan - a barony based on a mediaeval Gaelic kingdom, in County Monaghan, Ireland
- Dick Farney (1921–1987), Brazilian (jazz) pianist
- Marsha Farney (born 1958), American businesswoman and former educator from Georgetown, Texas
- A nickname for the Monaghan GAA team, Clones, Ireland
- An imaginary voice in the head of Ryan Freel, baseball player
