= Barton Family Foundation =

American charity

The Barton Family Foundation is a charity established in 2005 by United States Congressman Joe Barton to provide support to "select charitable organizations" in Texas's 6th congressional district, which Barton represents. His daughter-in-law, Amy Barton, is the Foundation's Executive Director. The foundation spent $130,000 on overhead between 2005 and 2008 and made $90,000 in donations.

The foundation drew page one attention from The New York Times when it was revealed that major energy corporations, such as the Chicago-based nuclear energy producer, Exelon Corporation, make large gifts to the Foundation. In June 2008, at a time when Barton had introduced legislation to assist corporations with the recycling of spent nuclear fuel, Barton solicited a $25,000 donation to the Foundation from Exelon. Exelon has also donated $80,000 to Barton's campaign funds.

According to a 2008 story in The New York Times, the foundation pledged $400,000 to the local Boys and Girls Club to help build a $1.2 million clubhouse. The Washington Times reported in 2009 that the foundation gave only $90,000 for the clubhouse. The foundation also pledged $500,000 for a local Meals on Wheels group. Although the foundation made no direct gifts to that charity, Energy Future Holdings and BNSF Railway gave $35,000 in the foundation's name. Both companies have also supported Barton election campaigns.

The donations by major energy corporations led to an investigation by the Office of Congressional Ethics in 2009. Barton was cleared of unethical conduct charges.
