= Luther Alexander Johnson =

American politician (1875–1965)

Luther A. Johnson
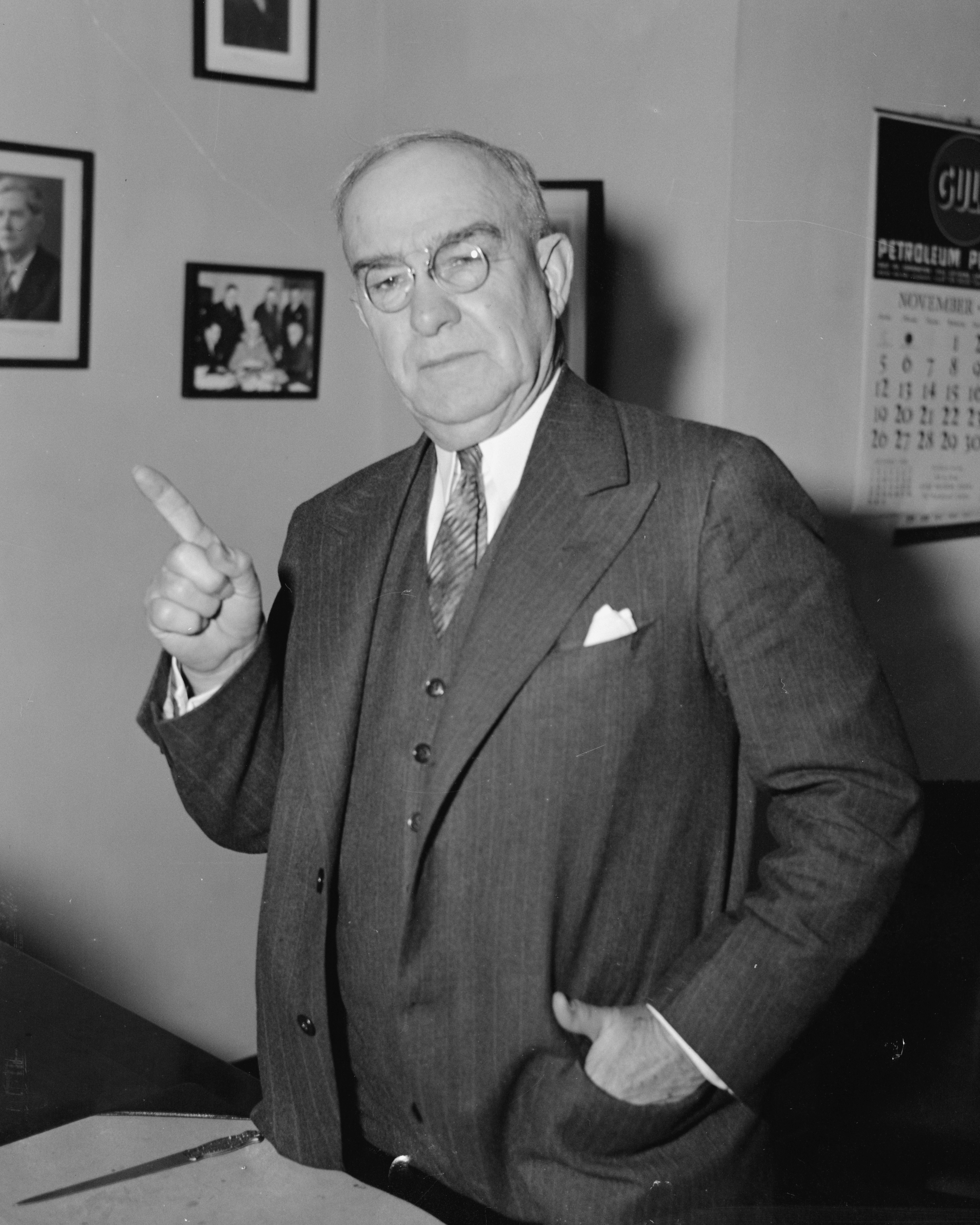
- Johnson in 1941.

Judge of the United States Tax Court
- In office 1946–1956

Member of the U.S. House of Representatives from Texas's 6th district
- In office March 4, 1923 – July 17, 1946
- Preceded by: Rufus Hardy
- Succeeded by: Olin E. Teague

District Attorney Texas 13th Judicial District
- In office 1904–1910

County Attorney Navarro County
- In office 1898–1902

Personal details
- Born: Luther Alexander Johnson; October 29, 1875 Corsicana, Texas, US
- Died: June 6, 1965 (aged 89) Corsicana, Texas, US
- Resting place: Oakwood Cemetery
- Party: Democratic
- Spouse: Turner Read
- Children: 2
- Education: Cumberland University
- Profession: Attorney
- Johnson's voice Johnson speaks in support of declaring war on Japan; Recorded December 8, 1941

Luther Alexander Johnson (October 29, 1875 – June 6, 1965) was an American lawyer, jurist, and politician who served as a United States Congressman from the U.S. state of Texas from 1923 to 1946.

== Early years ==
Luther was born in Corsicana, Texas, where he attended the public schools. He received his L.L.B. in 1896 from Cumberland University in Lebanon, Tennessee, and was admitted to the Bar the same year. He commenced practice in Corsicana and was attorney for Central Texas Grocery Company and The Royall Coffee Company.

He was a prosecuting attorney of Navarro County from 1898 to 1902 and district attorney of the thirteenth judicial district of Texas from 1904 to 1910.

He served as a delegate to the Democratic National Convention in 1916 and as chairman of the Democratic State convention in 1920.

== Congress ==
Johnson was elected as a Democrat to the Sixty-eighth and to the eleven succeeding Congresses and served from March 4, 1923, until his resignation on July 17, 1946.

A confidential 1943 analysis of the House Foreign Affairs Committee by Isaiah Berlin for the British Foreign Office described Johnson as

in Congress for nearly twenty years; a well-disposed farmer and capable business man. He is a typical southern Democrat in that he has stood staunchly behind the Administration's foreign policies and has supported most New Deal measures, except on such matters as labour. While strongly independent and equally strongly American, he is likely to put his weight behind the Administration's post-war policies and is traditionally pro-British. He made one of the most eloquent speeches in support of the unamended Lend-Lease Powers Act.

In his legislative role Johnson was most famous for his part in the passage of the Radio Act of 1927, stating that

American thought and American politics will be largely at the mercy of those who operate these stations. [If] a single selfish group is permitted to ... dominate these broadcasting stations throughout the country, then woe be to those who dare to differ with them." [67 Cong. Rec. 5558 (1926).]

== Later years ==
Johnson was appointed by President Harry S. Truman to be a judge of the United States Tax Court, holding this office from July 1946 until his retirement in September 1956.

=== Death ===
He returned to Corsicana until his death there on June 6, 1965. He was interred in Oakwood Cemetery.

== Personal life ==
Luther Alexander Johnson married Turner Read on July 19, 1899. The couple had two children. He became a ruling Elder in the Westminster Presbyterian Church (USA), where the couple had lifelong membership.

== Fraternal memberships ==
- Kappa Sigma
- Lions Clubs International
- Odd Fellows

U.S. House of Representatives
Preceded by Rufus Hardy	Member of the U.S. House of Representatives from Texas's 6th congressional district 1923–1946	Succeeded by Olin E. Teague
