= Joe Barton =

American politician (born 1949)

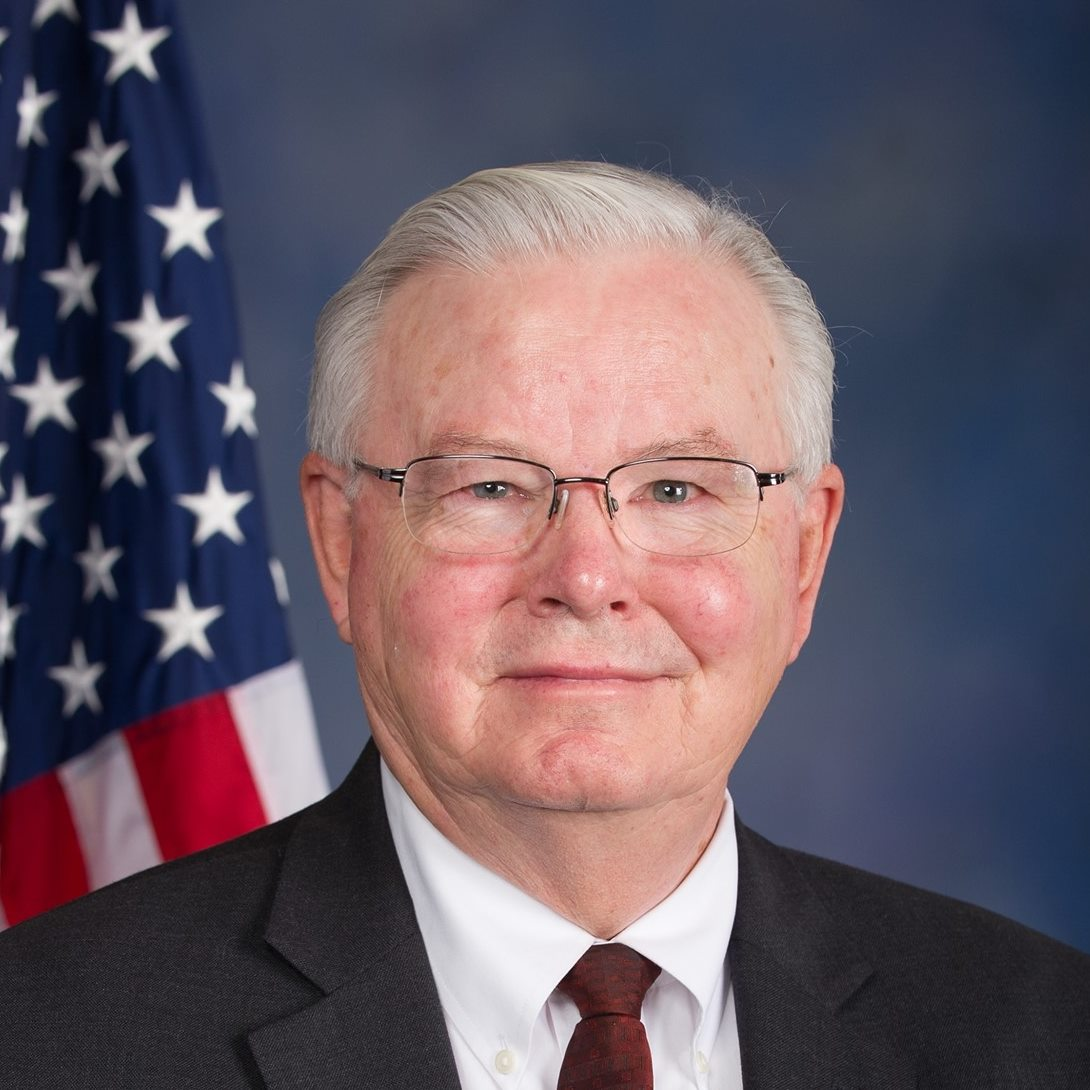
- Official portrait, 2017

Chair of the House Energy and Commerce Committee
- In office February 16, 2004 – January 3, 2007
- Preceded by: Billy Tauzin
- Succeeded by: John Dingell

Member of the U.S. House of Representatives from Texas's 6th district
- In office January 3, 1985 – January 3, 2019
- Preceded by: Phil Gramm
- Succeeded by: Ron Wright

Personal details
- Born: Joseph Linus Barton; September 15, 1949 (age 77) Waco, Texas, U.S.
- Party: Republican
- Spouses: Janet Winslow (m. 1971; div. 2003); Terri Brasier (m. 2004; div. 2015)
- Children: 4
- Education: Texas A&M University (BS); Purdue University (MS)
- Barton's voice Barton on legislation to modernize the Ryan White HIV/AIDS treatment program. Recorded September 28, 2006

Joseph Linus Barton (born September 15, 1949) is an American politician. A member of the Republican Party, he represented Texas's 6th congressional district in the U.S. House of Representatives from 1985 to 2019. The district included Arlington, part of Fort Worth, and several small towns and rural areas south of the Dallas–Fort Worth Metroplex. He was also a member of the Tea Party Caucus. In 2014, Barton became the longest-serving member of the Texas congressional delegation.

Barton described himself as "a constant defender of conservative ideals and values". He advocated for deregulation of the electricity and natural gas industries, and served as vice-chairman of the House Energy and Commerce Committees. He denied that manmade carbon emissions had contributed to global warming, was a proponent of the use of fossil fuels, voted in favor of the May 2017 GOP plan to replace Obamacare, supported President Donald Trump's ban on immigration from certain predominantly Muslim nations, and supported the death penalty for people caught spying. Barton led a successful effort to repeal the oil export ban in the House in 2015. His environmental record of defending industries against tighter pollution controls earned him the nickname "Smokey Joe."

Barton came to national prominence after telling a citizen at a town hall meeting to "shut up." He came to national attention again when sexually explicit photos that he had shared with women were leaked without his consent in 2017. In November 2017, Barton announced that he would not seek re-election in 2018 following this specific sex scandal.

== Early life, education, and early career ==
Barton was born in Waco, Texas, the son of Bess Wynell (née Buice) and Larry Linus Barton. He graduated from Waco High School. He attended Texas A&M University in College Station on a Gifford-Hill Opportunity Award scholarship, and received a B.S. in industrial engineering in 1972. An M.Sc. in industrial administration from Purdue University followed in 1973.

Following college, Barton entered private industry until 1981, when he became a White House Fellow and served under United States Secretary of Energy James B. Edwards. Later, he began consulting for Atlantic Richfield Oil and Gas Co., before being elected to the United States Congress in 1984.

== U.S. House of Representatives ==
=== Elections ===
==== 1984–86 ====
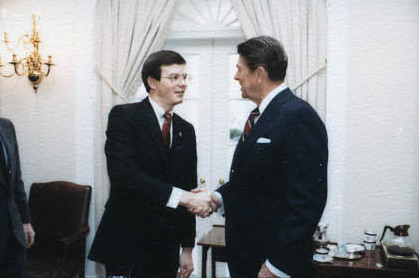
Barton meets President Ronald Reagan in 1984

Barton made his first run for elected office in 1984, when he entered the Republican primary for Texas's 6th congressional district after three-term incumbent Phil Gramm left his seat to run for the United States Senate that year. He finished first in the five-candidate field with 42%, and very narrowly defeated Max Hoyt in the runoff with 50%. He then defeated Democratic nominee and former State Representative Dan Kubiak 57%–43%. Barton was one of six freshmen Republican U.S. congressmen elected from Texas in 1984, known as the Texas Six Pack.

In 1986, Barton won re-election against Democratic candidate Pete Geren, who was later elected to Congress from a neighboring district. Barton defeated Geren 56%–44%.

==== 1988–2010 ====
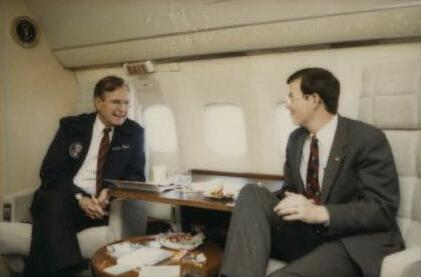
Barton meets President George H. W. Bush in 1989

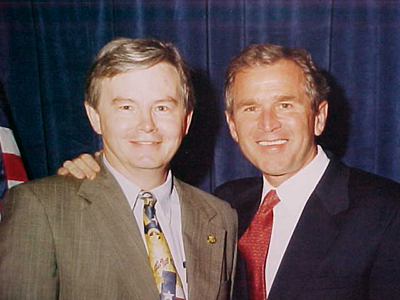
Barton with President George W. Bush

During this period, Barton won each re-election with 60% of the vote or more. His worst general election performance was in 2006, when he defeated Democratic candidate David Harris 60%–37%, a 23-point margin. The 2008 election was his second-worst performance, defeating Democratic candidate Ludwig Otto by a 26-point margin, 62%–36%.

He was only challenged in the primary twice in this time period: in 1992 and 1994. In 1992, he defeated Mike McGinn 79 to 21%. In 1994, he defeated Jerry Goode 89%–11%.

==== 2012 ====
Because of increasing controversy surrounding his record in office, election battles became increasingly contentious. In 2011, a Super PAC was formed by Texas conservative groups to remove him and several other long-time incumbents from office. The Democratic National Committee used Barton's comments in political ads, shown nationally against all Republican candidates. Several websites were created and dedicated to simply removing Barton from office. DefeatJoeBarton.com/ was created by Democratic challengers. All content was later removed, though the site is still owned.

Barton drew three primary challengers: Joe Chow, Mayor of Addison; Itamar Gelbman, a security consultant; and Frank C. Kuchar, a Dallas businessman and former preacher. Chow is Texas' first Asian-American mayor. He called Barton "the most corrupt congressman in the State of Texas." At the end of March 2012, Barton had $1.3 million in cash on hand, compared with $28,800 for Chow, $178,000 for Gelbman, and $463 for Kuchar.

==== 2014 ====
In the Republican primary on March 4, Barton won re-nomination to a 16th term in the U.S. House. He polled 32,579 (72.7%); his 2012 primary opponent, Frank Kuchar, trailed with 12,260 votes (27.3%). On November 4, Barton handily won re-election over Democratic opponent David Cozad.

==== 2016 ====
Barton polled 55,197 votes (68.7%) in a three-candidate field for the Republican House nomination in the March 1 primary election. The runner-up, Steven Fowler, received 17,927 votes (22.3%). To win his 17th consecutive term in the House, Barton then defeated in the November 8 general election the Democrat Ruby Faye Woolridge (born 1948) of Arlington, who had polled 22,954 votes (69.7%) in her earlier three-candidate Democratic primary. Barton finished with 159,444 votes (58.3%) to Woolridge's 106,667 (39%); the most any Democrat had received against Barton in his three-decade career. The remaining 7,185 votes (2.6%) went to the Green Party candidate, Darrel Smith, Jr.

==== 2018 ====
Texas's filing deadline for the House seat held by Barton was December 11, 2017. The primary was held March 6, 2018. Barton initially said that he would run for reelection, but announced on November 30, 2017, that he would not seek reelection in 2018.

If Barton resigned from his seat (as predicted by Austin Republican strategist Matt Mackowiak), there would be a special, open primary election in 2018, in which candidates from all parties would appear on a single ballot; if no candidate received more than 50% of the vote, then the top two vote-getters (regardless of party) will advance to a runoff.

Democrat former educator Ruby Faye Woolridge had indicated she would run for the seat, as did Democrats Jana Lynne Sanchez (endorsed by the New Democrat Coalition and the environmental group Climate Hawks Vote), party activist Justin Snider, Levii R. Shocklee of Arlington, and lawyer John Duncan. Republicans Jake Ellzey (a retired U.S. Navy fighter pilot and commissioner on the Texas Veterans Commission) and Dr. Monte Mark Mitchell (a Fort Worth physician, attorney, and custom home builder) filed to oppose Barton, and other Republican candidates for Barton's seat may include State Representative Tony Tinderholt, State Senators Brian Birdwell and Konni Burton, Ellis County Commissioner Paul Perry, and former Tarrant County Tax Assessor-Collector Ron Wright (Barton's former chief of staff and district director).

The Fort Worth Star-Telegram urged that Barton not seek re-election. Tim O'Hare, the Chairman of the Tarrant County Republican Party, called on Barton "to not seek re-election and to retire from Congress by the end of [2017]," saying he is guilty of "sexual immorality." Republican State Senators Konni Burton and Brian Birdwell also urged Barton to not seek re-election. Brian Mayes, a Dallas political consultant, said Barton was vulnerable in his upcoming election battle "if he gets a motivated opponent", and that he risked getting lumped in "fairly or unfairly" with sexual misconduct allegations in Congress. Barton announced on November 30, 2017, that he would not seek reelection.

=== Tenure ===
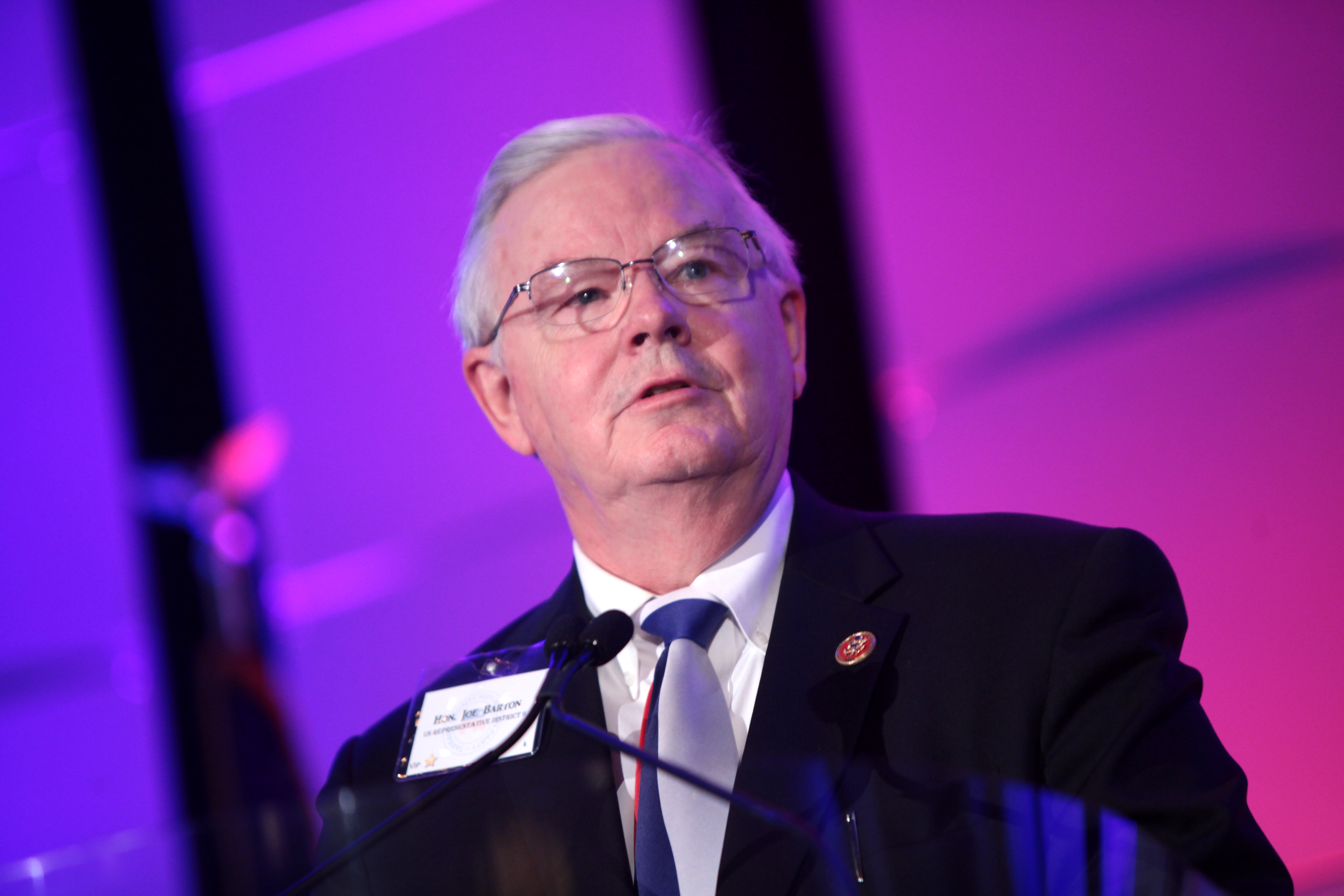
Barton speaking at the 2015 Lincoln Dinner in Fort Worth

Barton voted against the Emergency Economic Stabilization Act of 2008 in both of its manifestations.

In March 2011, Barton sponsored the Better Use of Light Bulbs Act, which would repeal the Energy Independence and Security Act of 2007, signed by President George W. Bush. The 2007 law set energy efficiency standards for light bulbs, effectively eliminating most or all incandescent light bulbs. Barton said "People don't want Congress dictating what light fixtures they can use."

Barton was a member of the Freedom Caucus and the United States Congressional International Conservation Caucus. In the first session of the 115th United States Congress, Barton was ranked the 42nd most bipartisan member of the House by the Bipartisan Index, a metric published by The Lugar Center and Georgetown's McCourt School of Public Policy to assess congressional bipartisanship.

Congressional action

- Former Chairman of the House Energy and Commerce Committee, House sponsor of the Energy Policy Act of 2005, and chairman of the House–Senate energy conference committee. On his website he speaks of his diligent work to promote a conservative agenda, and how "in his first legislative victory as Chairman, the House overwhelmingly passed legislation to limit indecency on the public airwaves."
- Both initiated and eliminated "safe harbor" provision for MTBE (in Energy Policy Act of 2005).
- Co-founded the Congressional Privacy Caucus, cosponsor of the anti-spyware SPY ACT, initiated National Institutes of Health Reform Act of 2006.
- Opposed the extension of the Voting Rights Act in 2006
- Barton was a leading voice in Congress for forcing the switch from analog to digital TV.
- Barton has supported the auctioning off the public airwaves to private companies.

==== Global warming ====
Prompted by a February 2005 Wall Street Journal article, Barton launched an investigation that year into two climate change studies from 1998 and 1999. In his letters to the authors of the studies he requested details on the studies and the sources of the authors grant funding. The Washington Post condemned Barton's investigation as a "witch-hunt". During former Vice President Al Gore's testimony to the Energy and Commerce Committee in March 2007, Barton asserted to Gore that "You're not just off a little, you're totally wrong" (climate scientists have refuted Barton's assertion), stating that "Global warming science is uneven and evolving."

Upset with House Speaker Nancy Pelosi's passage of global warming legislation in 2009, he said: "You can't regulate God." At the same time, Barton implied in 2009 that wind is a "finite resource," and there was a claim made that Barton was suggesting that greater use of wind turbines would "slow the winds down," which would "cause the temperature to go up," although a report in Snopes suggested that Barton was merely quoting an academic study which suggested that increased use of wind turbines might have unintended consequences for the environment, and that the claim about the linkage between increased use of wind turbines and slowing down the winds was incorrect. In 2013, when discussing the Keystone XL pipeline, he referred to the Genesis flood narrative in the Bible to argue that current climate change isn't man-made. Barton rejects the scientific consensus on climate change that climate change is real and that human activity is the primary cause. Barton has "mocked human-caused climate change" according to The New York Times, and is "a long-time denier of global warming" according to Time magazine, and "a longtime skeptic of human involvement in climate change" according to HuffPost. In any event, he suggested that humans will "adapt" to climate change because we can "get shade." "Barton has made a reputation for his outspoken rejection of man-made climate change, and for his support for the oil industry," according to Suzanne Goldenberg in The Guardian.

==== Autism bills controversy ====
Barton tried to block the bipartisan Combating Autism Act of 2006. He said that the money steered toward environmental causes of autism was not the reason he blocked passage of the bill.

The controversy stemmed from the conflict between two bills in the House and Senate. Barton introduced the National Institutes of Health Reform Act of 2006, while Senator Rick Santorum introduced the Autism bill. Santorum said in a CNN interview that the Senate bill was intended to be "fit into" Barton's bill in the House bill. He stated that "I was in constant conversation with him [Barton] and many House members all last week in an attempt to help the NIH bill come through the Senate, as well as try to move the Combating Autism bill through the Senate." Santorum stated that the Senate bill would investigate possible environmental causes, while the House bill would prevent that.

Barton let the bill die in committee, which upset many people who were vocal about saying Barton had sacrificed the interests of autistic children in the interests of the oil and gas companies that donate heavily to his campaign.

==== BP oil spill controversy ====
In June 2010, Barton accused the Obama administration of a "$20 billion shakedown" of oil giant BP after the company reached an agreement with the administration to establish an escrow account to pay the claims of people harmed by the Deepwater Horizon oil spill in the Gulf of Mexico. He made the accusation at the outset of a House hearing where BP's chief executive officer, Tony Hayward, appeared for the first time before Congress. Facing Hayward at the witness table, Barton said, "I apologize. I do not want to live in a country where any time a citizen or a corporation does something that is legitimately wrong, is subject to some sort of political pressure that is, again, in my words — amounts to a shakedown, so I apologize." Prior to the establishment of the agreement, the Obama administration had been public in their criticism of BP for the oil spill.

Barton's remarks were criticized by White House spokesman Robert Gibbs and Vice President Joe Biden, GOP congressional leadership as well as by Barton's fellow Republicans, some of whom called on him to relinquish his leadership role in the House Energy Subcommittee.

Barton later said that his earlier remarks had been "misconstrued" and that he believed BP was responsible for the accident. Later that day, he issued a statement apologizing for using the term "shakedown" and fully retracted his apology to BP.

==== Sodomy and abortion ====
In 2010, Barton backed a policy platform that called for re-criminalizing sodomy in Texas. He has 100% ratings from socially conservative groups such as the Family Research Council and the Christian Coalition of America for his opposition to abortion and LGBTQ rights.

==== CREW report ====
The organization Citizens for Responsibility and Ethics in Washington (CREW) put Barton on its "CREW's Most Corrupt Report 2011". The article stated that on Barton's 2008 financial disclosure statement, he inaccurately reported on the source of a natural gas interest that he bought into. The share was purchased through a longtime donor and supporter, who later died. This was discovered by the Dallas Morning News in 2010. According to the Dallas Morning News article, Barton made over $100,000 on the investment. The article and CREW Report both pointed out how Barton buying this undervalued asset from an "advisor" on energy issues could be a conflict of interest to the Congressman's position as the Chair of the House's Energy Subcommittee. It quoted James Thurber, a Distinguished Professor of Government at American University, as saying: "If you are elected as a public servant to try to do what is right for the public generally and then you use that position to help bring in material wealth, I think it's unethical."

CREW also reported that Barton paid his wife Terri $57,759 in salary and bonuses, from his campaign funds in the 2006 election cycle. A spokesman said that Terri served as the campaign's outreach director and planned fund raising and special events. in addition, Barton's daughter Kristin was paid $12,622 in salary and bonuses, and his mother, Nell Barton, was paid $7,000 for a car.

==== Crude oil ban ====
Barton expressed in September 2014 his full support of the U.S. lifting the 40-year-old ban on crude oil exports – an issue that sparked controversy among members of the Republican Party. Several research reports had found that exporting the glut of shale oil would ultimately lower U.S. and global fuel prices, rather than raise them; U.S. public opinion was divided on the issue.

==== Online poker ====
Barton has sought to permit online poker, and regulate it on a federal level. To that end, he has introduced the Online Poker Act of 2011, the Internet Poker Freedom Act of 2013, and the Internet Poker Freedom Act of 2015.

==== Health care ====
Barton favored repealing the Affordable Care Act (ACA, or Obamacare). Explaining why the American Health Care Act (the House Republicans' bill to repeal and replace for the Affordable Care Act) failed in March 2017, Barton said, "Sometimes you're playing fantasy football and sometimes you're in the real game. We knew the president, if we could get a repeal bill to his desk, would almost certainly veto it. This time we knew if it got to the president's desk it would be signed."

==== Hurricane Harvey relief ====
Barton voted against Hurricane Harvey relief in 2017. Barton said that he could not support an increase in the debt ceiling.

==== Immigration ====
Barton supported President Donald Trump's 2017 Executive Order 13769 banning entry to the United States by nationals of seven Muslim-majority nations.

In November 2017, Barton called on the House leadership to pass naturalization legislation for children who came across the border illegally with their parents.

=== Committee assignments ===
- Committee on Energy and Commerce (Chair emeritus)
  - Subcommittee on Commerce, Manufacturing and Trade
  - Subcommittee on Communications and Technology
  - Subcommittee on Energy and Power
  - Subcommittee on Environment and Economy
  - Subcommittee on Health
  - Subcommittee on Oversight and Investigations

== 1993 U.S. Senate election ==
In 1993, Barton ran in the special election for the U.S. Senate seat vacated by the resignation of Lloyd Bentsen, who became United States Secretary of the Treasury in the Clinton administration. Barton finished third in the contest, behind state treasurer Kay Bailey Hutchison and Senator Bob Krueger, thus missing a runoff slot. He divided the more conservative vote in that election with House colleague Jack Fields of Houston.

== Barton Family Foundation ==
The Barton Family Foundation was established in 2005 to support charities within the congressman's district. His daughter-in-law, Amy Barton, is the Foundation's Executive Director. Major energy corporations, such as the Chicago-based nuclear energy producer, Exelon Corporation, make major gifts to the Foundation. In June 2008, at a time when Barton had introduced legislation to assist corporations with the recycling of spent nuclear fuel, the corporation donated $25,000 to the Foundation. Exelon has also donated $80,000 to Barton's campaign funds. The Foundation gave $90,000 to the local Boys and Girls Club, this is the only recorded donation made by the Foundation in its seven-year history.

== Sex scandal ==
In November 2017, nude selfie pictures of Barton surfaced online, which he acknowledged were authentic, and which he apologized for to his constituents. He confirmed he himself took the photo, apparently from a video of him masturbating, and sent it to women with whom he was having consensual sexual relationships. An anonymous Twitter user posted the photo of Barton, who had pointed his camera upward from below his genitals, next to a text message reading, "I want you soo bad. Right now. Deep and hard."

An anonymous woman said that she had received the selfie and other explicit images from Barton, but she did not post any of them on the internet. She also shared with the Washington Post a 2015 recorded phone call in which Barton warned her against using the explicit materials "in a way that would negatively affect my career," threatening to report her to the Capitol Police if she did so. On the taped phone call, Barton said "... I ... met you twice while married and had sex with you on two different occasions"; the woman said that they had slept together in 2012 in Washington, DC, and in 2014 in Texas, and that the Congressman had reimbursed her for her airfare in cash on both occasions. The woman also shared with the Washington Post text and social media messages Barton exchanged with her, as well as a 53-second cellphone video in which Barton recorded himself masturbating. She described to the newspaper encounters and contact with Barton spanning a five-year period, beginning in 2011. She said she came forward because: "It's not normal for a member of Congress who runs on a GOP platform of family values and conservatism to be scouring the Internet looking for a new sexual liaison."

A week later a second woman, Kelly Canon, a board member of the Arlington Republican Club and a member of the Republican Women of Arlington who is a constituent of Barton's, shared a series of messages—some with sexual overtones—that Barton had sent to her. Barton sent the messages in 2012 and 2013, while Barton was married to his second wife. The messages included questions from Barton about whether Canon was "wearing a tank top only .. and no panties," followed by "answer me miss evasive." Barton also messaged her that "men are men...and u r definitely a sexy woman." When Canon responded that "all the good ones are married," Barton replied: "I dont know about good..but I am married ... but ...I am not thinking good thoughts at this moment ... blush." Barton confirmed that he had the message exchange.

A third woman, Cheryl Small, said on November 30, 2017, that Barton had sex with her multiple times in his Ennis office while he was married.

His second ex-wife said: "Of course I wasn't surprised. I guess I was more surprised that some of these ladies finally came forward." She said she found it ironic that Barton was one of President Bill Clinton's loudest critics during the Monica Lewinsky scandal. Similarly, columnist Jim Schutze of the Dallas Observer noted that Barton practically built his political career "on condemning the behavior of others and even on trying to make other people's private behavior against the law ...."

While Barton had no plans to resign immediately, according to a spokeswoman, and initially had said that he would run for reelection in 2018, a number of state and local politicians indicated that they might challenge him in the 2018 election for his seat. Barton hired a crisis communication firm, and said he had suffered a "potential crime." Outlets including Slate, NBC and CNN opined that Barton might be a victim of revenge porn, which—though not a federal crime—is a class A misdemeanor in Texas, punishable by up to one year in county jail and up to a $4,000 fine.

Randy Bellomy, Chairman of the Ellis County Republican Party, said "His lifestyle is inconsistent with Republican ideals, and he has brought disgrace not only to Ellis County and the 6th Congressional District, but also to the people of Texas and this great nation." Brian Mayes, a Dallas political consultant, said that the sexting "is something you'd expect from a young, immature college kid, not a grandfather." Texas GOP Chairman James Dickey said that the case is distinguishable from that of former Congressman Anthony Weiner and his sexting scandal, but that the two controversies share one "consistent message that everyone should take to heart: We should all think very hard before we post, text or otherwise share anything." Barton announced on November 30, 2017, that he would not seek reelection.

The Fort Worth Star-Telegram ran an editorial in reaction entitled "Hey Joe Barton, skipping the next election is not enough. It's time to go." It opined that it was not appropriate for Barton – who "can no longer be taken seriously" – to continue to represent the 6th Congressional District for another year, until January 2019. He left office at the end of his term, on January 3, 2019.

== Personal life ==
Barton was divorced from his first wife (Jeanette/Janet Sue Winslow) in 2003. He remarried in 2004, and divorced from his second wife (Terri) in 2015. In 2017 he was again engaged. His wife Terri said she filed for divorce after evidence that Barton had engaged in multiple affairs, and finding "a very sexually explicit video of one of his mistresses."

He has four children and five grandchildren. In December 2005, Barton suffered a heart attack and was taken to George Washington University Hospital.

== Electoral history ==
Texas's 6th congressional district: Results 1984–2016
Year	Republican	Votes	%	Democratic	Votes	%	Third Party	Party	Votes	%	Third Party	Party	Votes	%	Third Party	Party	Votes	%
1984	Joe Barton	131,482	57%	Dan Kubiak	100,799	43%												
1986	Joe Barton	86,190	56%	Pete Geren	68,270	44%												
1988	Joe Barton	164,692	68%	Pat Kendrick	78,786	32%												
1990	Joe Barton	125,049	66%	John Welch	62,344	33%												
1992	Joe Barton	189,140	72%	John Dietrich	73,933	28%												
1994	Joe Barton	152,038	76%	Terry Jesmore	44,286	22%	Bill Baird	Libertarian	4,688	2%								
1996	Joe Barton	152,024	76%	No candidate			Skeet Richardson	Independent	28,187	14%	Catherine Anderson	Libertarian	14,456	7%	Doug Williams	U.S.T.	6,547	3%
1998	Joe Barton	112,957	73%	Ben Boothe	40,112	26%	Richard Bandlow	Libertarian	1,817	1%								
2000	Joe Barton	222,685	88%	No candidate			Frank Brady	Libertarian	30,056	12%								
2002	Joe Barton	115,396	70%	Felix Alvarado	45,404	28%	Frank Brady	Libertarian	1,992	1%	B. J. Armstrong	Green	1,245	1%				
2004	Joe Barton	168,767	66%	Morris Meyer	83,609	33%	Stephen Schrader	Libertarian	3,251	1%								
2006	Joe Barton	91,927	60%	David Harris	56,369	37%	Carl Nulsen	Libertarian	3,740	2%								
2008	Joe Barton	174,008	62%	Ludwig Otto	99,919	36%	Max Koch	Libertarian	6,655	2%								
2010	Joe Barton	107,140	66%	David Cozad	50,717	31%	Byron Severns	Libertarian	4,700	3%								
2012	Joe Barton	145,019	58%	Kenneth Sanders	98,053	39%	Hugh Chauvin	Libertarian	4,847	2%	Brandon Parmer	Green	2,017	1%				
2014	Joe Barton	92,334	61%	David Cozad	55,027	36%	Hugh Chauvin	Libertarian	3,635	2%								
2016	Joe Barton	159,444	58%	Ruby Faye Woolridge	106,667	39%	Darrel Smith Jr.	Green	7,185	3%								

U.S. House of Representatives
Preceded by Phil Gramm	Member of the U.S. House of Representatives from Texas's 6th congressional district 1985–2019	Succeeded by Ron Wright
Preceded by Billy Tauzin	Chair of the House Energy and Commerce Committee; 2004–2007	Succeeded by John Dingell
Preceded by John Dingell	Ranking Member of the House Energy and Commerce Committee; 2007–2011	Succeeded by Henry Waxman
U.S. order of precedence (ceremonial)
Preceded by David Price as Former U.S. Representative	Order of precedence of the United States as Former U.S. Representative	Succeeded by Tom Petri as Former U.S. Representative
