= Scott Field (politician) =

American politician (1847–1931)

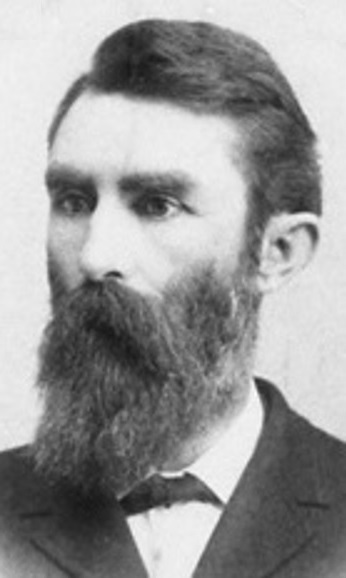
- Cropped portion of 1889 composite photo of state senators from the 21st Texas Legislature

Member of the U.S. House of Representatives from Texas's 6th district
- In office March 4, 1903 – March 3, 1907
- Preceded by: Dudley Goodall Wooten
- Succeeded by: Rufus Hardy

Member of the Texas Senate from the 14th district
- In office 1887–1891
- Preceded by: James S. Perry
- Succeeded by: James M McKinney

County Attorney of Robertson County
- In office 1878–1882

Personal details
- Born: January 26, 1847 Canton, Mississippi, US
- Died: December 30, 1931 (aged 84) Calvert, Texas, US
- Resting place: Calvert Cemetery
- Party: Democratic
- Spouse(s): Victoria Lucky (m. 1874; died 1877) Lucy Garrett Randolph (m. 1878; died 1903) Maude Harlan Green
- Children: 3
- Education: University of Virginia
- Profession: Attorney; Teacher

Military service
- Allegiance: Confederate States
- Branch/service: Confederate Army
- Rank: Private
- Unit: Harvey Scouts; Major General W. H. Jackson's Division
- Battles/wars: 1864 Atlanta campaign

Scott Field (January 26, 1847 – December 20, 1931) was an American politician who represented Texas in the United States House of Representatives from 1903 to 1907.

== Biography ==
Field was born in Canton, Mississippi. He attended the McKee School in Madison County, Mississippi.

== Military service ==
During the American Civil War, Field enlisted in the Confederate States Army as a member of the Harvey Scouts. Later, he served in Major General W.H. Jackson’s division, Forrest's Command, composed of Ross's Texas Brigade and Armstrong's Tennessee Brigade (cavalry). According to C.E. Holmes in an affidavit in Field's pension application, Field served in the Atlanta campaign of 1864 commanded by John Bell Hood.

== Education and law practice ==
After the war, Field attended the University of Virginia at Charlottesville, where he graduated in 1868. He returned to Mississippi and taught school for two years while studying law. Field was admitted to the Mississippi Bar in 1871.

Scott Field moved to Calvert, Texas in 1872 and opened a private law practice.

== Career in public service ==
He was the prosecuting attorney of Robertson County, Texas 1878–1882. Field also served in the Texas Senate 1887–1891 and was a delegate to the Democratic National Convention in 1892. During his term in the Texas State Senate, he was the lead sponsor of a law to ban convict labor, a practice thought of as a second incarnation of slavery, as it routinely involved rounding up minorities on false misdemeanor charges and putting them to work during harvest season.

Field was elected as a Democrat to the Fifty-eighth and Fifty-ninth Congresses (March 4, 1903 – March 3, 1907). He was not a candidate for reelection in 1906 to the Fiftieth Congress. After leaving Congress, he resumed the practice of law until 1913, when he engaged in extensive agricultural pursuits.

== Later years and Confederate pension ==
Soldier's Application for a Confederate Pension, #49968, State of Texas, was filed by Scott Field, Sr., July 13, 1931. It was approved the same date. In the application, Field stated that he had enlisted from Canton, Mississippi and served from September 1863 until the end of the war. The application contains a letter from Joe Y. McNutt, County Judge of Robertson County, to the Hon. Geo. H. Sheppard, Comptroller of Public Accounts, Austin, Texas, July 11, 1931, stating that Field was completely blind and aided by an attendant. McNutt testified to Field's character and stated that Field had suffered financial reverses in recent years.

== Personal life ==
Scott Field was the son of Henry and Jane (Bates) Field. of Canton, Mississippi.

He married three times. Field married Victoria Lucky on December 13, 1874, and she died on February 21, 1877, at the age of 26. He married Lucy E. Garrett Randolph on June 6, 1878. Lucy was the widow of George F. Randolph. Scott and Lucy had three sons, Thomas, Scott and Eugene. Lucy died on August 20, 1903. Upon her death, he married the widow Maude Harlan Green. According to his application for a Confederate pension, his wife was "not living" at the time of the application. His death certificate mentions his wife at the time of death was "Mrs. Maude H. Field" and does not say she was deceased.

== Death ==
Field died in Calvert, Texas on December 30, 1931 of cerebral thrombosis at the home of his son, Tom Field, and was buried in Calvert Cemetery.

U.S. House of Representatives
Preceded by Dudley Goodall Wooten	Member of the U.S. House of Representatives from Texas's 6th congressional district 1903–1907	Succeeded by Rufus Hardy
