= Texas's 20th House of Representatives district =

American legislative district

Texas's 20th State House of Representatives district
Representative
Terry Wilson; R–Georgetown

District 20 is a district in the Texas House of Representatives. It has been represented by Republican Terry Wilson since 2017.

== Members ==
- William E. Estes (until 1870)
- Joseph Abbott (1870–1873)
- Levi Gillette (after 1873)
- Dan Gattis (2003–2011)
- Charles Schwertner (2011–2013)
- Marsha Farney (2013–2017)
- Terry Wilson (since 2017)
