= Terry Wilson (politician) =

Texas politician

Terry M. Wilson

Member of the Texas House of Representatives from the 20th district
- Incumbent
- Assumed office January 10, 2017
- Preceded by: Marsha Farney

Personal details
- Born: Terry Mac Wilson Jr. August 28, 1964 (age 62) Odessa, Texas, U.S.
- Party: Republican
- Spouse: Shannon Wilson
- Children: 2
- Education: Texas A&M University; Air War University
- Website: Campaign website

Military service
- Allegiance: United States
- Branch: United States Army
- Rank: Colonel

Terry Mac Wilson Jr. (born August 28, 1964) is an American politician who is a Republican member of the Texas House of Representatives for the 20th District, which used to include Burnet, Milam, and Williamson counties. After the 2020 census, the district was redrawn to include 33% of Williamson County, including 59% of Cedar Park, 100% of Florence, 79% of Georgetown, 100% of Jarrell, 67% of Leander, 78% of Liberty Hill, and 100% of Serenada and Sonterra. He defeated incumbent Marsha Farney in the 2016 Republican primary election and went on to win the November 2016 general election unopposed.

In the general election held on November 6, 2018, Wilson again prevailed with 57,741 votes (71.6 percent) to 22,943 (28.4 percent) for Democrat Stephen M. Wyman.

In the 2024 Texas House of Representatives election on November 5, 2024, Wilson prevailed over Democrat Stephen M. Wyman with 64,086 votes (59.8 percent) to 43,148 votes (40.2 percent). Wilson received the most votes for a Republican for the 20th House District, beating Donald Trump's vote total of 64,061 votes (56.4 percent).

A native of Odessa, Texas, Wilson holds a Bachelor of Science degree in business administration from Texas A&M University in College Station and a Master of Science in Strategic Logistics Plans and Management from the Air War University in Montgomery, Alabama. He served for thirty years in the United States Army and retired as a decorated colonel. He is a conservative legislator who supports school choice. He resides with his wife, Shannon, and two sons, William and Benjamin, in Marble Falls in Burnet County.

Texas House of Representatives
Preceded by Marsha Farney	Member of the Texas House of Representatives from the 20th district 2017–present	Incumbent
