= Jo Abbott =

American politician (1840–1908)

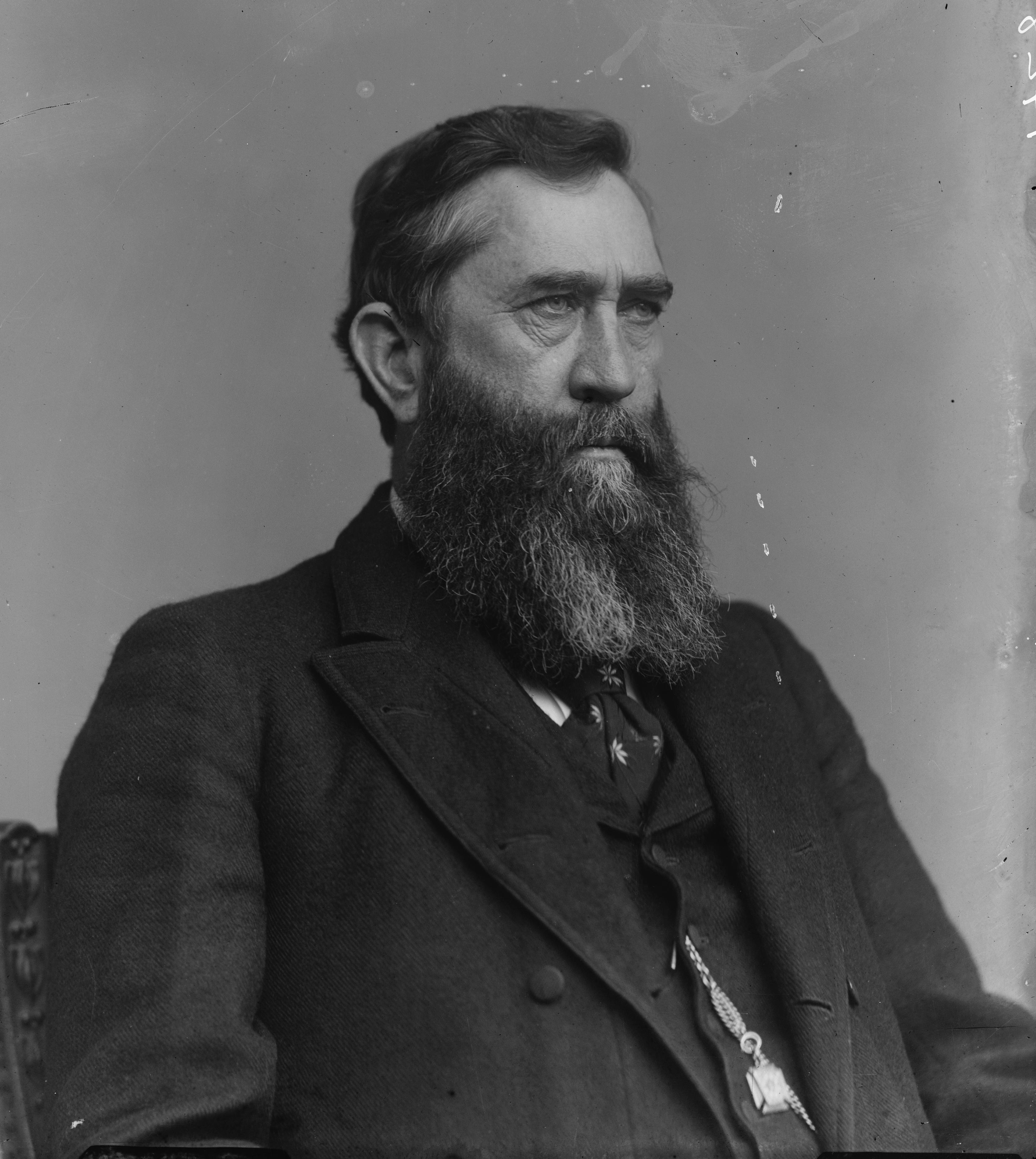

Member of the U.S. House of Representatives from Texas's 6th district
- In office March 4, 1887 – March 3, 1897
- Preceded by: Olin Wellborn
- Succeeded by: Robert E. Burke

Member of the Texas House of Representatives from the 20th district
- In office February 9, 1870 – January 14, 1873
- Preceded by: William E. Estes
- Succeeded by: Levi Gillette

Personal details
- Born: January 15, 1840 Morgan County, Alabama, U.S.
- Died: February 11, 1908 (aged 68) Hillsboro, Texas, U.S.
- Party: Democratic
- Spouse: Rowena Sturgis (m. 1868)
- Profession: Lawyer; judge; politician

Military service
- Allegiance: Confederacy
- Branch/service: Confederate States Army
- Years of service: 1861–1865
- Rank: First lieutenant
- Unit: Company B, 12th Texas Cavalry Regiment
- Battles/wars: American Civil War; Battle of Whitney's Lane; Battle of Cotton Plant; Battle of Pleasant Hill; Battle of Yellow Bayou (WIA)

Joseph B. "Jo" Abbott (January 15, 1840 – February 11, 1908) was a lawyer, judge, Confederate Army officer, member of the Texas House of Representatives and a member of the United States House of Representatives from Texas.

The city of Abbott, Texas, is named for him.

== Biography ==
Joseph B. Abbott was born January 15, 1840, to William and Mary (née McMillan) Abbott in Morgan County, Alabama, near Decatur, and attended the public schools. His parents were both born near Petersburg, Virginia. His father William had been a soldier in the War of 1812, and was stationed at Norfolk, Virginia. Abbott moved with his parents to Freestone County, Texas, in 1853. He was educated by the scholar Franklin Laughlin Yoakum, the father of Benjamin Franklin Yoakum and the president of Larissa College, and George F. Allison, who operated a classical school in Freestone County. He began to read law in 1859 and continued in this practice until the beginning of the American Civil War.

Abbott entered into service of the Confederate Army in the Civil War as a junior second lieutenant, eventually becoming a first lieutenant in Company B of the Twelfth Texas Cavalry Regiment. He fought in at least half a dozen battles including the Battle of Cotton Plant, the Battle of Pleasant Hill, and the Battle of Yellow Bayou, in which he was wounded and disabled for many months. He later rejoined his command and remained with it until the end of the war.

After the end of the war he resumed his studies of law and entered the office of Lochlin J. Farrar in Springfield, Limestone County, Texas, and received instructions from D. W. Pendergast. Abbott was admitted to the bar by Robert S. Gould, who became a chief justice of the Texas Supreme Court. After he became licensed in October 1866, he began to practice law in Springfield as a partner of Farrar. He moved to Hill County in 1867, where he taught a school for five months. He returned to his legal profession after the county court system was organized in 1868. On December 15, 1868, he married Rowena Sturgis of Hillsboro, daughter of James W. L. and Martha Sturgis.

He was a member of the Texas House of Representatives from 1870 to 1873 He was appointed a district judge in the Twenty-eighth judicial district by Governor Oran M. Roberts. In 1880, he was elected for a full four-year term for that position. In 1886, he was elected as a Democrat to the United States House of Representatives, and served in that capacity through the end of Fifty-Fourth Congress in 1897. Upon leaving Congress, he resumed his legal career in Hillsboro, Texas, where he died on February 11, 1908.

== Electoral history ==
=== 1886 election ===
Texas's 6th congressional district election, 1886 Source:
Party	Candidate	Votes	%
Democratic	Jo Abbott	19,185	60
Independent	J. C. Kearby	11,750	36.7
Republican	A. B. Norton	1,069	3.3
Total votes		32,004	100

U.S. House of Representatives
Preceded by Olin Wellborn	Member of the U.S. House of Representatives from Texas's 6th congressional district 1887–1897	Succeeded by Robert E. Burke
Texas House of Representatives
Preceded by William E. Estes	Member of the Texas House of Representatives from District 20 (Hillsboro); 1870–1873	Succeeded by Levi Gillette
