= Rufus Hardy (politician) =

American politician

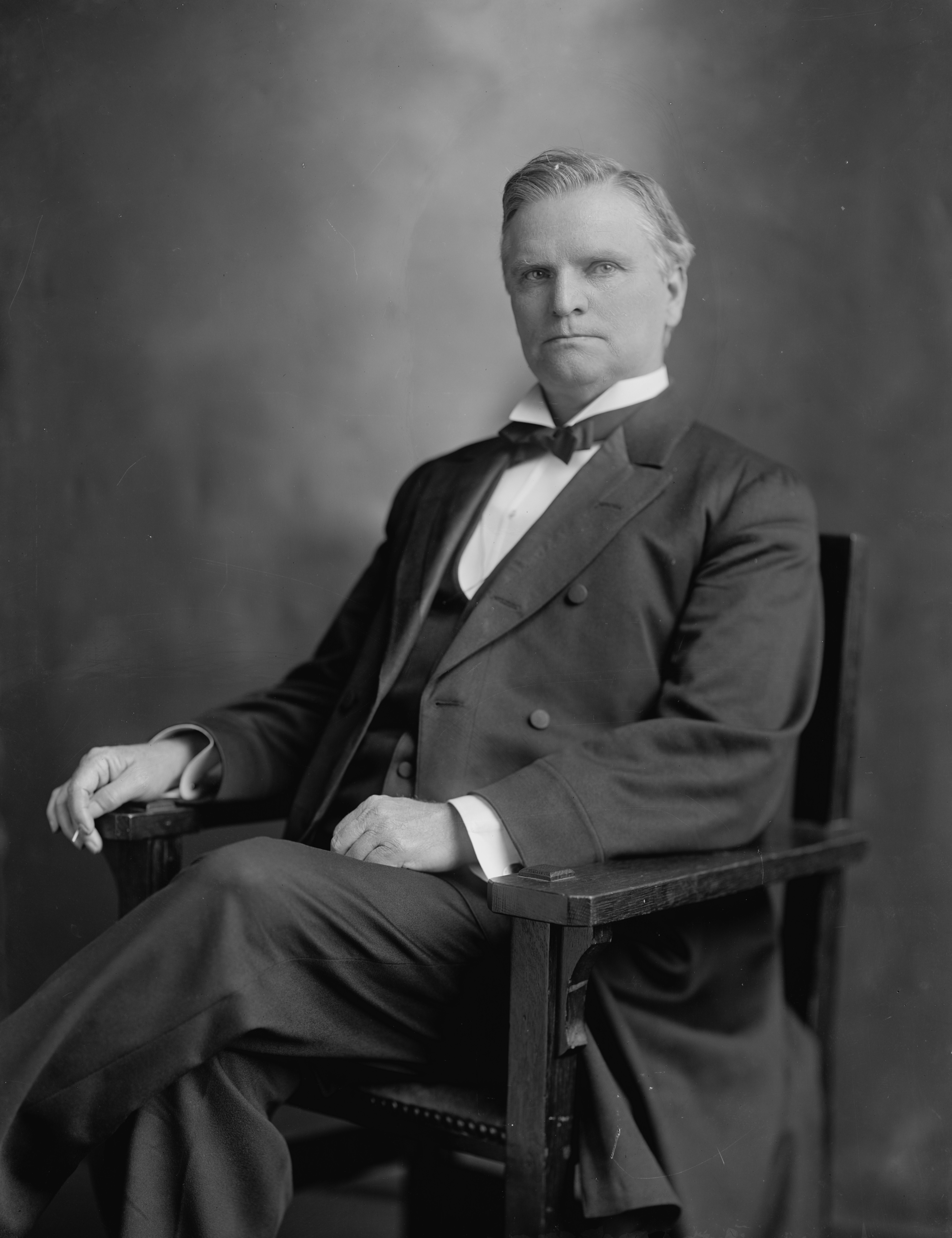

United States Congressman Texas 6th Congressional District
- In office March 4, 1907 – March 3, 1923
- Preceded by: Scott Field
- Succeeded by: Luther Alexander Johnson

District Judge Texas 13th Judicial District
- In office 1888–1896

District Attorney Texas 13th Judicial District
- In office 1884–1888

County Attorney Navarro County
- In office 1880–1884

Personal details
- Born: December 16, 1855 Monroe County, Mississippi, US
- Died: March 13, 1943 (aged 87) Corsicana, Texas, US
- Resting place: Oakwood Cemetery
- Party: Democratic
- Spouse: Felicia E. Peck
- Children: 6
- Education: University of Georgia Somerville Institute, Mississippi
- Profession: Attorney

Rufus Hardy (December 16, 1855 – March 13, 1943) was a United States representative of the Democratic Party from the state of Texas.

== Early years ==
Hardy was born Monroe County, Mississippi, to George Washington and Pauline J. (Whitaker) Hardy. The family moved to Millican, Texas, in 1861.

Hardy enrolled at Somerville Institute in Noxubee County, Mississippi, in 1871, and received his L.L.B. from the University of Georgia in 1875. In 1876, he opened his law practice in Navasota, Texas, and moved to Corsicana, Texas, in 1878.

== Career in public service ==
From 1880 to 1884 he served as a prosecuting attorney of Navarro County, Texas. He served as District Attorney for the Texas 13th Judicial District 1884–1888, and as District Judge of the same district 1888–1896. Hardy was represented Texas in the United States House of Representatives 1907–1923. Upon retirement from Congress, Hardy returned to private practice in Corsicana.

== Personal life ==
In 1881, Hardy was married to Felicia E. Peck.

== Fraternal memberships ==
- Benevolent and Protective Order of Elks
- Knights of Pythias
- Phi Delta Theta

== Bibliography ==
- Hardy, Rufus (1887). Address delivered at the united prohibition and anti-prohibition picnic at Belle Point, Texas, Saturday, June 18, 1887. Corsicana Daily Courier Print.
- Hardy, Rufus (1908). On motion to strike out Section 23 of Criminal Code,: Which makes it a crime for any officer to fail to select a juror because of race, color, or previous ... January 13, and January 7, 1908.
- Hardy, Rufus (1908). Safety of Bank Deposits.

U.S. House of Representatives
Preceded by Scott Field	Member of the U.S. House of Representatives from Texas's 6th congressional district 1907–1923	Succeeded by Luther Alexander Johnson
