= Dan Gattis =

American politician

Texas House of Representatives
- In office January 2003 – January 2011
- Preceded by: Zeb Zbranek
- Constituency: District 20 (Milam County) and most of (Williamson County)

Personal details
- Born: December 1, 1967 (age 58) Austin, Texas
- Party: Republican
- Spouse: Shana Nugent Gattis
- Children: Sterling Jack Gattis, Carson Marie Gattis, Kenedy Sue Gattis
- Occupation: Attorney & Rancher

Dan Gattis (born 1967) is an Attorney and Rancher living in Central Texas. He was a Republican member of the Texas House of Representatives, formerly representing the 20th District from 2003 to 2011. His district was made up of Milam and part of Williamson County Gattis had planned to run for the Texas State Senate in 2010, after serving 4 terms in the Texas House of Representatives, after State Senator Steve Ogden announced his potential retirement but later withdrew from the race and instead announced that he himself was retiring from political office to spend more time with his family and in his legal and ranching endeavors. Coinciding with Gattis' retirement announcement, Senator Ogden subsequently reconsidered his retirement and announced for re-election. Since retiring from public office Dan is often sought after for political and legislative advice.

== Personal life and Occupation ==
Dan Gattis is a 6th generation Texan, born in Austin, Texas, to a long time Williamson County farming and ranching family. His mother is a retired public school teacher, and his Father, Dan A. Gattis is a former high school agricultural teacher, former General Manager (President/CEO) of the Houston Livestock Show & Rodeo and the former County Judge of the Williamson County Commissioners Court. Gattis lives in Jonah, Texas (outside of Georgetown, Texas) with his wife Shana, and three children.

Dan is a founder of the Gattis Law Firm, PC, where he predominately practices in the field of representing landowners in eminent domain and condemnation matters and also manages his and his family's farming and ranching operations. Dan is a member of the National Trial Lawyers Top 100 and the Million Dollar Advocates Forum. Previously, he worked as a prosecutor for the Williamson County Attorney's Office and the Williamson County District Attorney's Office.

== Education ==
Dan Gattis attended Friendswood High School, in Friendswood, Texas. He went on to graduate from Texas A&M University in 1990. Here, he was a member of the Corps of Cadets, the Ross Volunteer Company and as Class of 1990 President. Gattis obtained his J.D. degree at South Texas College of Law in 1993.

== Election results ==
=== 2008 ===
Texas general election, 2008: House District 20
Party	Candidate	Votes	%
Republican	Dan M. Gattis (Incumbent)	57,029	64.70
Democratic	James Dillon	26,907	30.52
Libertarian	Craig C. Weems	4,199	4.76

=== 2006 ===
Texas general election, 2006: House District 20
Party	Candidate	Votes	%
Republican	Dan Gattis (Incumbent)	31,158	63.37
Democratic	Jim Stauber	18,006	36.62

=== 2004 ===
Texas general election, 2004: House District 20
Party	Candidate	Votes	%
Republican	Dan Gattis (Incumbent)	48,920	68.78
Democratic	Jim Strauber	22,202	31.21

=== 2002 ===
Texas general election, 2002: House District 20
Party	Candidate	Votes	%
Republican	Dan M. Gattis	34,736	100

== Legislative Involvement ==
Representative Gattis served on several committees, including the House Appropriations Committee and the Budget Conference Committee, where he was the main health and welfare budget writer.

Furthermore, Gattis was Vice-Chair of the Subcommittee on Health and Human Services, the Chair for budget and oversight to the House Natural Resources Committee, and a member of the Joint Committee on State Water Funding and Select Environmental Flows Advisory Group. When not in session, Gattis served on the House Select Committee on Property Tax Relief and Appraisal Reform, which held hearings throughout Texas to hear from taxpayers and officials on how to reform the property tax system.

== Legislative Work ==
Representative Dan Gattis was a part of the passage of many bills.

=== 81st Session ===
(2009–2010)

In January, 2009 Gattis filed HB 747, which will make it easier for officers to attain breath or blood samples from assumed drunk drivers, given that they have been arrested for two or more DWI offenses. Gattis said this will enable officers to hold the most serious DWI offenders accountable for their actions.

In April, 2009 Gattis filed HB 4815, which was intended to require some non-HOA residents of an Austin area suburb to join a nearby mandatory HOA, as their Municipal Utility District (MUD) was to be annexed by the city of Cedar Park. Some residents felt that their property rights were being infringed upon, but the MUD's lobby was effective.

=== 80th Session ===
(2007–2008)

In the 80th Session, Gattis passed HB 1557 and SB 1832, which eliminates marked up charges on healthcare expenses. Gattis also led the passage of HB 8, known as Jessica's Law, which toughens punishment for child sex offenders. Additionally, Gattis passed HB 1355, which deals with punishment of irresponsible owners in the case of serious dog attacks. Beyond this, the Representative kept the identity of an abused student private with SB 606.

=== 79th Session ===
(2005–2006)

In the 79th session, Gattis authored HB 836 in the 79th Session, which allows patients to state whether they want generic or name brand drugs, before receiving their prescription. It also gives patients the right to pay the listed price if it is lower than the co-pay price. Beyond this, Gattis passed HB 904, which allows prison sentences for those possessing child pornography to be increased by judges. Gattis has passed several pieces of legislation that give judges more authority on denying bail on criminal defends, among other issues. Additionally Gattis authored HB 1208. This bill limits municipal utility districts in applying eminent domain.

=== 78th Session ===
(2003–2004)

Gattis authored HB 136, which enables counties and cities to freeze property tax rates for those who are disabled or are over the age of 65. Also dealing with property tax issues, Gattis passed SB 392 and HB 2346 which deals with specific knowledge residents must be aware of and their rights to challenge appraisals. Gattis also co-authored HB 263 that reinforces child advocacy centers, and helped the passage of SB 319 and HB 246, known as the "Laci Peterson" law. Gattis fought to defeat HB 2020 which would have lowered the bonding requirements for oil and gas wells in Texas. While the Railroad Commission must consider the production capacity of Texas oil producers, the commission also must protect citizens affected by pollution from abandoned wells. By loosening the bonding requirement, CSHB 2020 would have weakened the Railroad Commission's ability to prevent pollution by Texas operators.
