= Zeb Zbranek =

American politician

Member of the Texas House of Representatives from the 20th district
- In office January 12, 1993 – January 14, 2003
- Preceded by: Curtis Soileau
- Succeeded by: Dan Gattis

Personal details
- Born: September 28, 1962 (age 64) Liberty, Texas
- Party: Democratic

Zeb Zbranek (born September 28, 1962) is an American politician who served in the Texas House of Representatives from the 20th district from 1993 to 2003.
