= Olin E. Teague =

American politician and World War II Veteran (1910–1981)

Tiger Teague
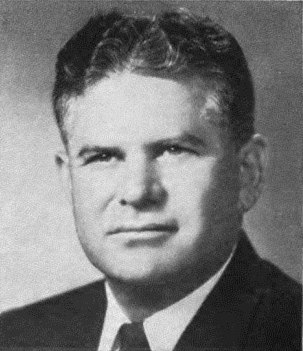

Chair of the House Science Committee
- In office January 3, 1973 – December 31, 1978
- Preceded by: George P. Miller
- Succeeded by: Don Fuqua

Chair of the House Veterans' Affairs Committee
- In office January 3, 1955 – January 3, 1973
- Preceded by: Edith Nourse Rogers
- Succeeded by: William Jennings Bryan Dorn

Member of the U.S. House of Representatives from Texas's 6th district
- In office August 24, 1946 – December 31, 1978
- Preceded by: Luther A. Johnson
- Succeeded by: Phil Gramm

Personal details
- Born: Olin Earl Teague; April 6, 1910 Woodward, Oklahoma, U.S.
- Died: January 23, 1981 (aged 70) Bethesda, Maryland, U.S.
- Party: Democratic
- Education: Texas A&M University
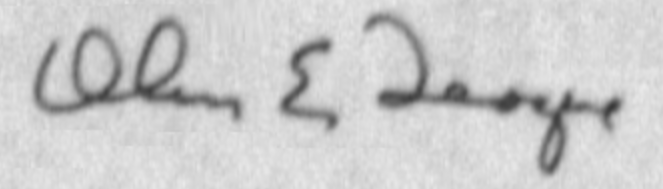
- Signature

Military service
- Allegiance: United States
- Branch/service: United States Army
- Years of service: 1940–1946
- Rank: Colonel
- Awards: Silver Star; Bronze Star; Purple Heart (2)

Olin Earl "Tiger" Teague (April 6, 1910 – January 23, 1981) was an American politician and World War II veteran who served as the U.S. representative for Texas's 6th congressional district as a Democrat for 32 years, from 1946 to 1978. He is buried in Arlington National Cemetery.

== Biography ==
=== Early life ===
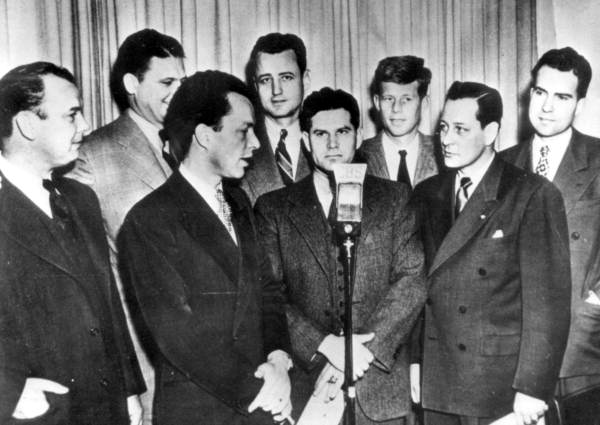
Teague (center, front row) with the Congressional freshman class of 1947. Future presidents John F. Kennedy and Richard Nixon can be seen to his right in the back row.

Born in Oklahoma and raised in Mena, Arkansas, Teague graduated from the Agricultural and Mechanical College of Texas (now Texas A&M University) in 1932. Until 1940 he was a Postal employee in College Station, Texas. Being Reserve Officers' Training Corps, as all A&M students were, Teague was commissioned on graduation for a five-year tour in the organized reserves. In 1937 he moved into the National Guard. He joined the active United States Army in 1940 as a lieutenant and was discharged in 1946 as a colonel. Teague remained in the reserves until a court ruling in 1971 that members of Congress could not be in the reserves. He went into combat on D-Day plus thirteen as an infantry commander. On December 18, 1944, he received the sixth of his wounds in the left ankle and lower back and has hospitalized until August 26, 1946. Teague was a decorated combat veteran of World War II, receiving the Silver Star with two clusters, the Bronze Star, and two Purple Hearts.

The nickname "Tiger" came from his play on the football field while in high school.

=== Elections ===
Thanks to the appointment of the incumbent Democrat to the United States Tax Court, the Sixth Congressional District became vacant on July 17, 1946. Two candidates for the Democratic nomination were already in and then were joined by three others, including Teague. He took only second place in the primary with 22%, but the losing three candidates endorsed him and the primary leader dropped out. There was no Republican candidate. Teague was in the 79th Congress but, it having adjourned, could not take his seat until the 80th convened in January 1947. He faced no primary opponent again until 1960 and another in 1964. There was a Republican opponent in 1950 who took only 2% and others in 1964 (18%), 1972 (27%), and 1974 (17%).

Teague's largely rural district was greatly affected by the court cases on redistricting of the 1960s and 1970s. Changes for the 1966 election moved his district to within the Dallas, Fort Worth, and Houston areas. The district was changed again for the 1968 election and again for the 1972 contest. In the latter case, it retreated from the Houston area but was now 82% metropolitan by population. The Texas legislature had expended great effort in securing Teague, now a major protector of the state's aerospace industry in the House, but his lack of electoral competition owed less to the legislature than his own status.

What ended Teague's long congressional career was his failing health. A serious stroke in 1975, diabetes related circulation issues that led to a partial leg amputation, and recurring slight strokes encouraged electoral competition. A primary opponent in 1976 held Teague to 54%, and a Republican took 33% in November. Teague did not contest the 1978 election.

=== Congressional career ===
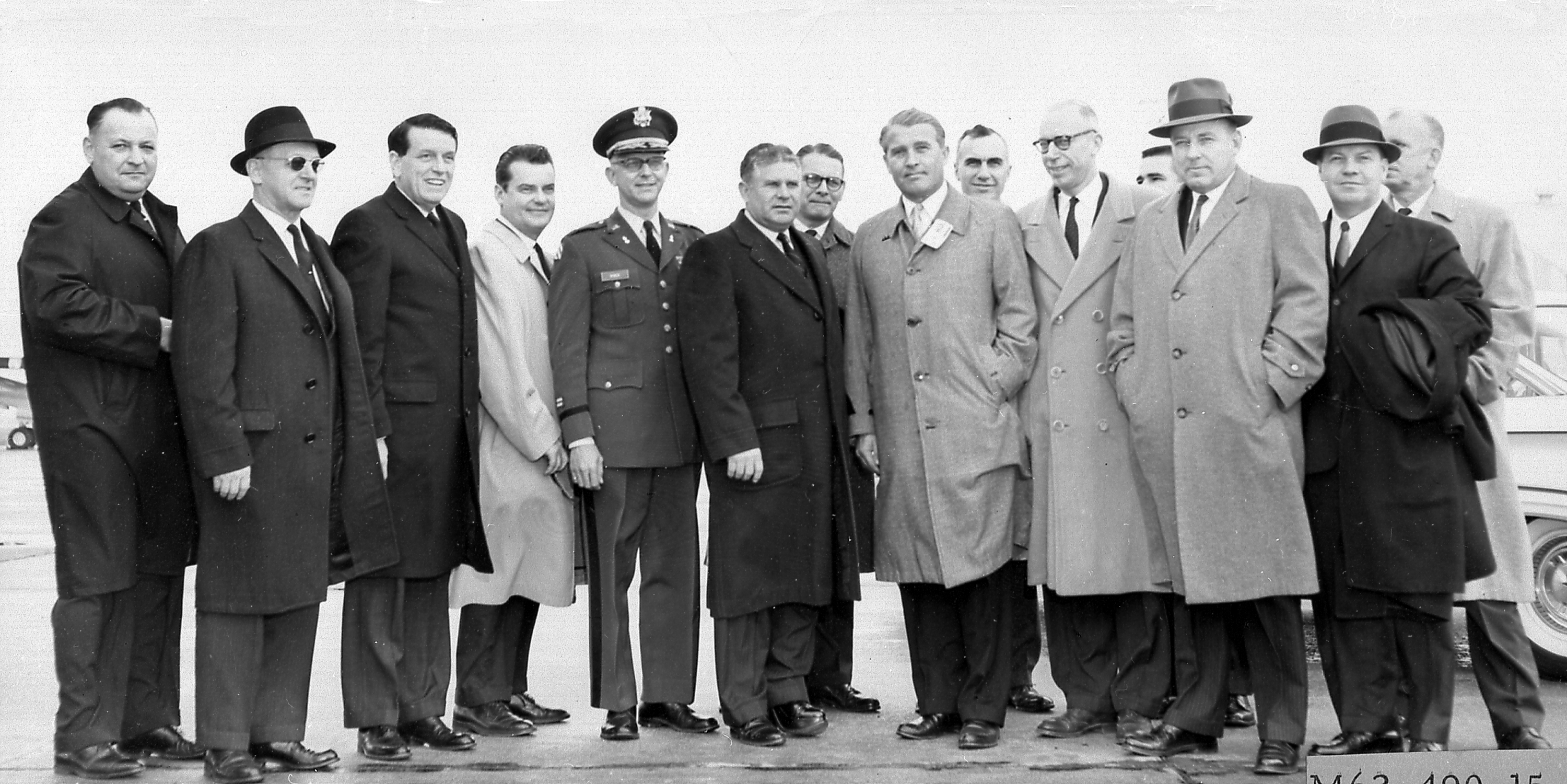
Rep. Olin Teague and other members of the House Committee on Science and Astronautics visited the Marshall Space Flight Center on March 9, 1962, to gather first-hand information of the nation's space exploration program.

While in Congress, he was a champion for veterans, authoring more veterans' legislation than any congressmember before him. He was one of the majority of the Texan delegation to decline to sign the 1956 Southern Manifesto opposing the desegregation of public schools ordered by the Supreme Court in Brown v. Board of Education. However, Teague voted against the Civil Rights Acts of 1957, the Civil Rights Acts of 1960, the Civil Rights Acts of 1964, and the Civil Rights Acts of 1968, as well as the 24th Amendment to the U.S. Constitution and the Voting Rights Act of 1965.

He proposed 50 amendments in Congress, including: Providing for the election of President and Vice President; to abolish the electoral college (1953); Provides representation for the people of the District of Columbia (1957); Relative to appointment of postmasters (1959); Proposal with respect to the appointment of postmasters (1961); Empowering Congress to grant representation in the Congress and among the electors of President and Vice President to the people of the District of Columbia (1950, 1951, and 1953); Equal rights regardless of sex (1967).

He was instrumental in improving benefits for servicemen's survivors. In 1956, he helped overhaul the survivor's benefits, with the creation of the Dependency and Indemnity Compensation. He was also chairman of the House Democratic Caucus, chairman of the House Committee on Veterans Affairs (1955–1972), and chairman of the House Committee on Science and Astronautics (1973–1978). Before 1973, he also chaired the Manned Space Flight Subcommittee and in that capacity oversaw NASA's efforts to place a man on the moon. In 1976, Teague was pivotal in establishing the Office of Science and Technology Policy.

== Legacy ==
The Olin E. Teague Veterans Center, a VA hospital and health center in Temple, Texas, was named for him. The VA also presents the annual Olin E. Teague Award for contributions to improving the quality of life of disabled veterans. Also named for him were the Olin E. Teague Research Center at Texas A&M, a space research facility, and the original visitor center at the Johnson Space Center (closed in 1992).

U.S. House of Representatives
Preceded by Luther A. Johnson	Member of the U.S. House of Representatives from Texas's 6th congressional district 1946–1978	Succeeded by Phil Gramm
