= Texas's 6th congressional district =

U.S. House district for Texas

Coordinates: 32°14′06″N 96°39′57″W

- Interactive map of district boundaries
- Representative: Jake Ellzey; R–Midlothian
- Distribution: 88.7% urban; 11.3% rural
- Population (2025): 848,133
- Median household income: $86,609
- Ethnicity: 44.9% White; 33.8% Hispanic; 13.6% Black; 3.6% Asian; 3.2% Two or more races; 0.9% other
- Cook PVI: R+14

Texas's 6th congressional district of the United States House of Representatives is in an area that includes Hill, Ellis, Navarro, Anderson, and Cherokee Counties to the south and southeast of the Dallas/Fort Worth area plus the southeast corner of Tarrant County, a sliver of Dallas County, and northern Freestone County. As of the 2010 census, the 6th district represented 698,498 people. The district is currently represented by Republican Jake Ellzey.

The district was represented by Joe Barton from 1985 until 2019. Other notable representatives include Olin "Tiger" Teague and Phil Gramm. The latter served as a Democrat, then notably resigned and ran as a Republican to win the ensuing special election.

A special election to fill the seat was held on May 1, 2021, with the winner being determined in a July 27 runoff after no candidate received a majority of the vote. In the runoff, Republican state representative Jake Ellzey defeated fellow Republican Susan Wright (the widow of Ron Wright and the endorsee of then-former President Donald Trump), winning the seat.

== Recent election results from statewide races ==
=== 2023–2027 boundaries ===
Year	Office	Results
2008	President	McCain 64% - 35%
2012	President	Romney 67% - 33%
2014	Senate	Cornyn 73% - 27%
2014	Governor	Abbott 70% - 30%
2016	President	Trump 64% - 32%
2018	Senate	Cruz 61% - 38%
2018	Governor	Abbott 66% - 33%
2018	Lt. Governor	Patrick 61% - 37%
2018	Attorney General	Paxton 61% - 37%
2018	Comptroller of Public Accounts	Hegar 63% - 34%
2020	President	Trump 61% - 37%
2020	Senate	Cornyn 62% - 35%
2022	Governor	Abbott 65% - 34%
2022	Lt. Governor	Patrick 63% - 34%
2022	Attorney General	Paxton 63% - 34%
2022	Comptroller of Public Accounts	Hegar 66% - 32%
2024	President	Trump 64% - 35%
2024	Senate	Cruz 60% - 37%

=== 2027–2033 boundaries ===
Year	Office	Results
2008	President	McCain 64% - 35%
2012	President	Romney 67% - 33%
2014	Senate	Cornyn 72% - 28%
2014	Governor	Abbott 68% - 32%
2016	President	Trump 62% - 34%
2018	Senate	Cruz 59% - 40%
2018	Governor	Abbott 64% - 34%
2018	Lt. Governor	Patrick 60% - 38%
2018	Attorney General	Paxton 59% - 39%
2018	Comptroller of Public Accounts	Hegar 61% - 35%
2020	President	Trump 59% - 40%
2020	Senate	Cornyn 60% - 37%
2022	Governor	Abbott 62% - 37%
2022	Lt. Governor	Patrick 60% - 38%
2022	Attorney General	Paxton 60% - 37%
2022	Comptroller of Public Accounts	Hegar 63% - 35%
2024	President	Trump 61% - 38%
2024	Senate	Cruz 57% - 40%
2026	Senate	Talarico 50% - 47%
2026	Governor	Abbott 50% - 49%

== Current composition ==
For the 118th and successive Congresses (based on redistricting following the 2020 census), the district contains all or portions of the following counties and communities:

Anderson County (4)

All 4 communities

Cherokee County (11)

All 11 communities

Dallas County (3)

Dallas (part; also 3rd, 4th, 5th, 24th, 30th, 32nd, and 33rd; shared with Collin, Denton, Kaufman, and Rockwall counties), Grand Prairie (part; also 30th and 33rd; shared with Ellis and Tarrant counties), Irving (part; also 24th and 33rd)

Ellis County (20)

All 20 communities

Freestone County (4)

Fairfield, Kirvin, Streetman (shared with Navarro County), Wortham

Hill County (14)

All 14 communities

Johnson County (8)

Alvarado, Burleson (part; also 25th; shared with Tarrant County), Coyote Flats (part; also 25th), Grandview, The Homesteads, Keene (part; also 25th), Mansfield (part; also 33rd, shared with Ellis and Tarrant counties), Venus (shared with Ellis County)

Navarro County (19)

All 19 communities

Tarrant County (3)

Arlington (part; also 25th, 30th, and 33rd), Grand Prairie (part; also 30th and 33rd; shared with Dallas and Ellis counties), Mansfield (part; also 33rd, shared with Ellis and Johnson counties)

== Future composition ==
Beginning with the 2026 election, the 6th district will consist of the following counties:

- Dallas (part)
- Ellis
- Johnson (part)
- Navarro
- Tarrant (part)

== List of members representing the district ==
Member	Party	Years	Cong ress	Electoral history
District established March 4, 1875
Gustav Schleicher (Cuero)	Democratic	March 4, 1875 – January 10, 1879	44th 45th	Elected in 1874. Re-elected in 1876. Re-elected in 1878. Died.
Vacant		January 10, 1879 – April 15, 1879	45th 46th	
Christopher C. Upson (San Antonio)	Democratic	April 15, 1879 – March 3, 1883	46th 47th	Elected to finish Schleicher's term. Re-elected in 1880. Lost renomination.
Olin Wellborn (Dallas)	Democratic	March 4, 1883 – March 3, 1887	48th 49th	Redistricted from the 3rd district and re-elected in 1882. Re-elected in 1884. Lost renomination.
Jo Abbott (Hillsboro)	Democratic	March 4, 1887 – March 3, 1897	50th 51st 52nd 53rd 54th	Elected in 1886. Re-elected in 1888. Re-elected in 1890. Re-elected in 1892. Re-elected in 1894. Retired.
Robert E. Burke (Dallas)	Democratic	March 4, 1897 – June 5, 1901	55th 56th 57th	Elected in 1896. Re-elected in 1898. Re-elected in 1900. Died.
Vacant		June 5, 1901 – July 13, 1901	57th	
Dudley G. Wooten (Dallas)	Democratic	July 13, 1901 – March 3, 1903	57th	Elected to finish Burke's term. Lost renomination.
Scott Field (Calvert)	Democratic	March 4, 1903 – March 3, 1907	58th 59th	Elected in 1902. Re-elected in 1904. Retired.
Rufus Hardy (Corsicana)	Democratic	March 4, 1907 – March 3, 1923	60th 61st 62nd 63rd 64th 65th 66th 67th	Elected in 1906. Re-elected in 1908. Re-elected in 1910. Re-elected in 1912. Re-elected in 1914. Re-elected in 1916. Re-elected in 1918. Re-elected in 1920. Retired.
Luther Alexander Johnson (Corsicana)	Democratic	March 4, 1923 – July 17, 1946	68th 69th 70th 71st 72nd 73rd 74th 75th 76th 77th 78th 79th	Elected in 1922. Re-elected in 1924. Re-elected in 1926. Re-elected in 1928. Re-elected in 1930. Re-elected in 1932. Re-elected in 1934. Re-elected in 1936. Re-elected in 1938. Re-elected in 1940. Re-elected in 1942. Re-elected in 1944. Resigned to become U.S. Tax Judge.
Vacant		July 17, 1946 – August 24, 1946	79th	
Olin E. Teague (College Station)	Democratic	August 24, 1946 – December 31, 1978	79th 80th 81st 82nd 83rd 84th 85th 86th 87th 88th 89th 90th 91st 92nd 93rd 94th 95th	Elected to finish Johnson's term. Re-elected in 1946. Re-elected in 1948. Re-elected in 1950. Re-elected in 1952. Re-elected in 1954. Re-elected in 1956. Re-elected in 1958. Re-elected in 1960. Re-elected in 1962. Re-elected in 1964. Re-elected in 1966. Re-elected in 1968. Re-elected in 1970. Re-elected in 1972. Re-elected in 1974. Re-elected in 1976. Retired, then resigned.
Vacant		December 31, 1978 – January 3, 1979	95th	
Phil Gramm (College Station)	Democratic	January 3, 1979 – January 5, 1983	96th 97th 98th	Elected in 1978. Re-elected in 1980. Re-elected in 1982. Resigned to run as a Republican.
Vacant		January 5, 1983 – February 12, 1983	98th	
Phil Gramm (College Station)	Republican	February 12, 1983 – January 3, 1985	98th	Re-elected to finish his own term. Retired to run for U.S. senator.
Joe Barton (Ennis)	Republican	January 3, 1985 – January 3, 2019	99th 100th 101st 102nd 103rd 104th 105th 106th 107th 108th 109th 110th 111th 112th 113th 114th 115th	Elected in 1984. Re-elected in 1986. Re-elected in 1988. Re-elected in 1990. Re-elected in 1992. Re-elected in 1994. Re-elected in 1996. Re-elected in 1998. Re-elected in 2000. Re-elected in 2002. Re-elected in 2004. Re-elected in 2006. Re-elected in 2008. Re-elected in 2010. Re-elected in 2012. Re-elected in 2014. Re-elected in 2016. Retired due to scandal.
Ron Wright (Arlington)	Republican	January 3, 2019 – February 7, 2021	116th 117th	Elected in 2018. Re-elected in 2020. Died.
Vacant		February 7, 2021 – July 30, 2021	117th	
Jake Ellzey (Midlothian)	Republican	July 30, 2021 – present	117th 118th 119th	Elected to finish Wright's term. Re-elected in 2022. Re-elected in 2024. Re-elected in 2026.

== Election results ==
US House election, 2004: Texas District 6
Party	Candidate	Votes	%	±%
Republican	Joe Barton (incumbent)	168,767	66.0	−4.3
Democratic	Morris Meyer	83,609	32.7	+5.0
Libertarian	Stephen Schrader	3,251	1.3	+0.1
Turnout		255,627		
Republican hold		Swing	-4.7	

US House election, 2006: Texas District 6
Party	Candidate	Votes	%	±%
Republican	Joe Barton (incumbent)	91,927	60.5	−5.5
Democratic	David Harris	56,369	37.1	+4.4
Libertarian	Carl Nulsen	3,740	2.5	+1.2
Turnout		152,036		
Republican hold		Swing		

US House election, 2008: Texas District 6
Party	Candidate	Votes	%	±%
Republican	Joe Barton (incumbent)	174,008	62.0	+1.5
Democratic	Ludwig Otto	99,919	35.6	−1.5
Libertarian	Max Kock, III	6,655	2.4	−0.1
Turnout		280,582		
Republican hold		Swing		

US House election, 2010: Texas District 6
Party	Candidate	Votes	%	±%
Republican	Joe Barton (incumbent)	107,140	65.9	+3.9
Democratic	David Cozad	50,717	31.2	−4.4
Libertarian	Byron Severns	4,700	2.9	+0.5
Turnout		162,557		
Republican hold		Swing		

US House election, 2012: Texas District 6
Party	Candidate	Votes	%	±%
Republican	Joe Barton (incumbent)	145,019	58.0	−7.9
Democratic	Kenneth Sanders	98,053	39.2	+8.0
Libertarian	Hugh Chauvin	4,847	1.9	−1.0
Green	Brandon Parmer	2,017	0.8	+0.8
Turnout		249,936		
Republican hold		Swing		

US House election, 2014: Texas District 6
Party	Candidate	Votes	%	±%
Republican	Joe Barton (incumbent)	92,334	61.1	+3.1
Democratic	David Cozad	55,027	36.4	−2.8
Libertarian	Hugh Chauvin	3,635	2.4	+0.5
Turnout		150,996		
Republican hold		Swing		

US House election, 2016: Texas District 6
Party	Candidate	Votes	%	±%
Republican	Joe Barton (incumbent)	159,444	58.3	−2.8
Democratic	Ruby Faye Woolridge	106,667	39.0	+2.6
Green	Darrel Smith	7,185	2.6	+2.6
Turnout		273,296		
Republican hold		Swing		

US House of Representatives elections, 2018: Texas District 6
Party	Candidate	Votes	%	±%
Republican	Ron Wright	135,779	53.1	−5.2
Democratic	Jana Lynne Sanchez	116,040	45.4	+6.4
Libertarian	Jason Harber	3,724	1.5	−0.9
Turnout		255,543		
Republican hold		Swing		

2020 United States House of Representatives elections in Texas: Texas District 6
Party	Candidate	Votes	%	±%
Republican	Ron Wright (incumbent)	179,507	52.8	−0.3
Democratic	Stephen Daniel	149,530	44.0	−1.4
Libertarian	Melanie A. Black	10,955	3.2	+1.7
Turnout		339,992		
Republican hold		Swing		

2021 Texas's 6th congressional district special election
Primary election
Party	Candidate	Votes	%
Republican	Susan Wright	15,052	19.21
Republican	Jake Ellzey	10,851	13.85
Democratic	Jana Sanchez	10,497	13.39
Republican	Brian Harrison	8,476	10.81
Democratic	Shawn Lassiter	6,964	8.89
Republican	John Anthony Castro	4,321	5.51
Democratic	Tammy Allison Holloway	4,238	5.41
Democratic	Lydia Bean	2,920	3.73
Republican	Michael Wood	2,503	3.19
Republican	Michael Ballantine	2,224	2.84
Republican	Dan Rodimer	2,086	2.66
Democratic	Daryl J. Eddings Sr.	1,652	2.11
Republican	Mike Egan	1,543	1.97
Democratic	Patrick Moses	1,189	1.52
Democratic	Manuel R. Salazar III	1,119	1.43
Republican	Sery Kim	888	1.13
Republican	Travis Rodermund	460	0.59
Independent	Adrian Mizher	351	0.45
Democratic	Brian K. Stephenson	271	0.35
Libertarian	Phil Gray	265	0.34
Democratic	Matthew Hinterlong	252	0.32
Republican	Jennifer Garcia Sharon	150	0.19
Democratic	Chris Suprun	102	0.13
Total votes		78,374	100
General election
Republican	Jake Ellzey	20,837	53.27
Republican	Susan Wright	18,279	46.73
Total votes		39,116	100.00
Republican hold			

This special election took place after Wright died from health complications related to COVID-19 on February 7, 2021.

=== 2024 ===
2024 United States House of Representatives elections in Texas
Party	Candidate	Votes	%
Republican	Jake Ellzey (incumbent)	192,834	66.4
Democratic	John Love III	97,711	33.6
Total votes		290,545	100.0
Republican hold			

== Historical district boundaries ==
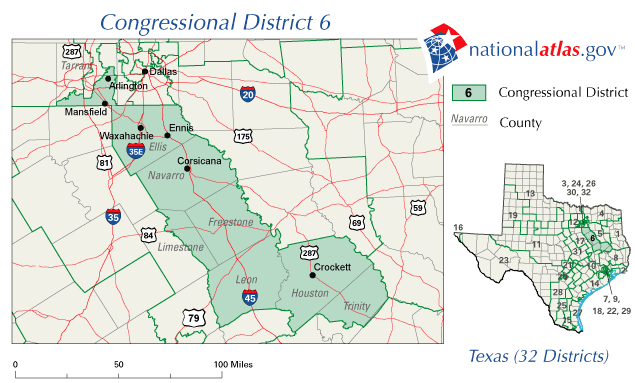
2007–2013

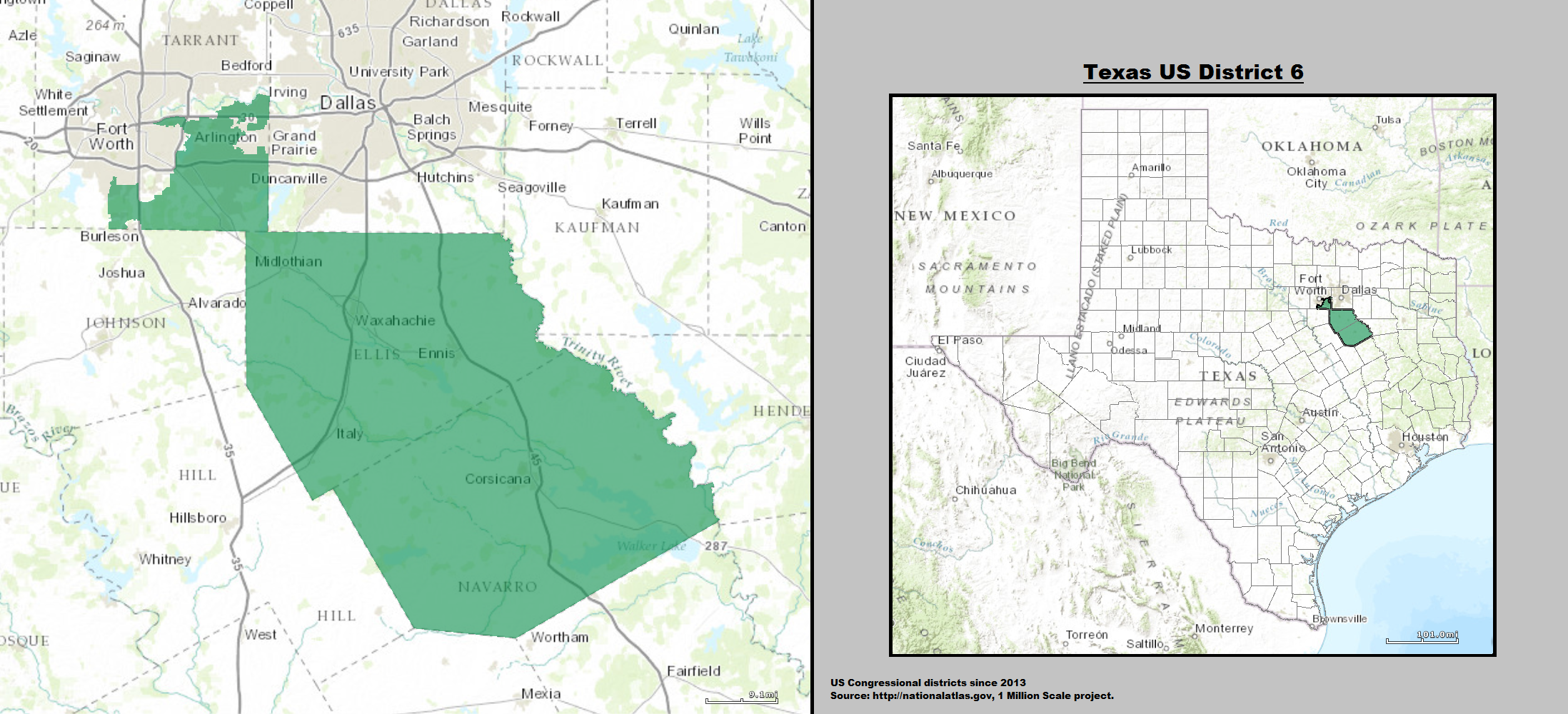
2013–2023

Early in the district's history, it stretched from the southern Dallas-Fort Worth suburbs all the way to Houston's northern suburbs. As Houston and DFW grew, the district shrank gradually northward, reaching its current boundaries today.

=== 2012 redistricting ===
The 2012 redistricting process removed all of Trinity, Houston, Leon, Freestone, and Limestone counties from the district, while making the district more compact in southeastern Tarrant County.

== See also ==
- List of United States congressional districts
