= Marsha Farney =

American politician

Marsha Lane Hatley Farney

Member of the Texas House of Representatives from the 20th district
- In office January 8, 2013 – January 10, 2017
- Preceded by: Charles Schwertner
- Succeeded by: Terry Wilson

Member of the Texas Board of Education from the 10th district
- In office 2011–2013
- Preceded by: Cynthia Dunbar
- Succeeded by: Tom Maynard

Personal details
- Born: December 15, 1958 (age 67) Place of birth missing Reared in Dallas and Paris, Lamar County, Texas, U.S.
- Party: Republican
- Spouse(s): (1) Nelson Louis Gonyaw (married 1976-1995, divorced) (2) William Bryan Farney (married 1999)
- Children: Ashley Michelle Gonyaw Bules; Bryan Paul Gonyaw; Drew Farney
- Parent(s): Hurshell Hartford Hatley; Shirley June Abney Hatley
- Education: Texas A&M University–Commerce; University of Texas at Austin
- Occupation: Former educator Businesswoman

Marsha Lane Hatley Farney (born December 15, 1958) is an American businesswoman and former educator from Georgetown, Texas. From 2013 to 2017, she was a Republican member of the Texas House of Representatives for District 20, based in Burnet and Milam counties and a portion of northern Williamson County, a suburb of Austin in the central portion of the state.

In her bid for a third term, Farney was unseated in the Republican primary election held on March 1, 2016, by Terry Wilson, who polled 18,754 votes (54.3 percent) to her 15,809 (45.7 percent).

Texas House of Representatives
Preceded by Charles Schwertner	Member of the Texas House of Representatives from the 20th district 2013–2017	Succeeded by Terry Wilson

Preceded by Cynthia A. Dunbar	Member of the Texas Board of Education for District 10; 2011–2013	Succeeded by Tom Maynard
