= Robert E. Burke =

American politician

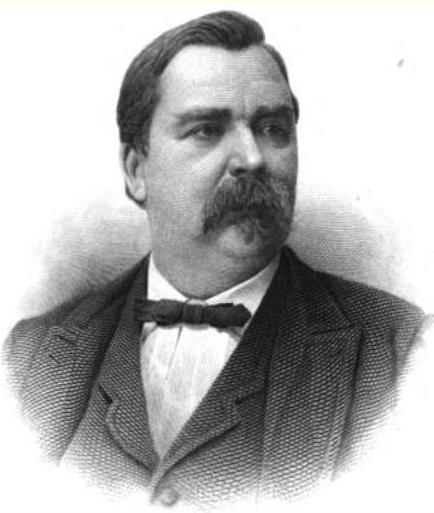

Member of the U.S. House of Representatives from Texas's 6th district
- In office March 4, 1897 – June 5, 1901
- Preceded by: Jo Abbott
- Succeeded by: Dudley Goodall Wooten

District Judge 14th Judicial District
- In office 1888–1896

County Judge Dallas County, Texas
- In office 1878–1888

Dallas City Council
- In office 1874–1875

Personal details
- Born: Robert Emmet Burke; August 1, 1847 Alabama
- Died: June 5, 1901 (aged 53) Dallas, Texas
- Resting place: Greenwood Cemetery
- Party: Democratic
- Spouse: Mary L. Henderson
- Children: Robert E Albert C Lucille
- Profession: Attorney

Military service
- Allegiance: Confederate States of America
- Branch/service: Confederate States Army
- Unit: 10th Georgia Regiment
- Battles/wars: American Civil War

Robert Emmet Burke (August 1, 1847 – June 5, 1901) was an American lawyer, jurist, and veteran of the Confederate States Army who served three terms as a U.S. representative from Texas from 1897 to 1901 until his death in office.

== Early years ==
Robert Emmet Burke was born near Dadeville, Alabama, and attended nearby public schools. He moved to Jefferson, Texas, in 1866.

== Civil War ==
Burke enlisted as a private in Confederate States Army, Company D 10th Georgia Regiment before the age of sixteen and served throughout the Civil War.

== Legal and judicial service ==
Robert Emmet Burke studied law. He was admitted to the bar in November 1870 and commenced practice in Dallas, Texas, in 1871. He served as judge of Dallas County from 1878 to 1888. He served as judge of the fourteenth judicial district of Texas from 1888 to 1896.

=== Congress ===
Burke was elected as a Democrat to the Fifty-fifth, Fifty-sixth, and Fifty-seventh Congresses and served from March 4, 1897.

== Death ==
Robert Emmet Burke died in Dallas, Texas, June 5, 1901, and was interred in Greenwood Cemetery.

== Bibliography ==
- Burke, Robert Emmet (1898). Bankruptcy. Gov't Print. Off. ASIN: B0008AN6NA.
- Burke, Robert Emmet (1898). McKinley Prosperity ... Speech of Hon. R.E. Burke, of Texas, in the House ... February 3, 1898. Gov't Print. Off. ASIN: B0008AMY3I.
- Burke, Robert Emmet (1899). Fortifications appropriation bill;: Speech of Hon. R.E. Burke, of Texas, in the House of Representatives, Monday, February 27, 1899. ASIN: B0008APLEW.
- Burke, Robert Emmet (1898). Gold standard—Puerto Rico. Gov't Print. Off. ASIN: B00087Y6QE.

== See also ==
- List of members of the United States Congress who died in office (1900–1949)

== Sources ==
- United States Congress. "Robert E. Burke (id: B001097)". Biographical Directory of the United States Congress.
- Biography from the Handbook of Texas Online
- Memorial addresses on the life and character of Robert E. Burke, late a representative from Texas delivered in the House of Representatives and Senate frontispiece 1902

U.S. House of Representatives
Preceded by Jo Abbott	Member of the U.S. House of Representatives from Texas's 6th congressional district 1897–1901	Succeeded by Dudley Goodall Wooten
