= Dudley G. Wooten =

American politician (1860–1929)

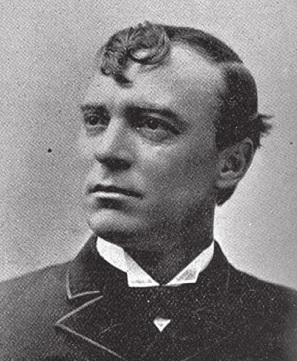
- From 1900's Chicago Conference On Trusts

United States Congressman Texas 6th Congressional District
- In office July 13, 1901 – March 3, 1903
- Preceded by: Robert Emmet Burke
- Succeeded by: Scott Field

Member Texas House of Representatives 73rd District
- In office 1899–1901

County Judge Dallas County
- In office 1890–1892

City Attorney Austin, Texas
- In office 1884–1886

Personal details
- Born: Dudley Goodall Wooten; June 19, 1860 Missouri, US
- Died: February 7, 1929 (aged 68) Austin, Texas, US
- Party: Democratic
- Education: Princeton University Johns Hopkins University University of Virginia Charlottesville
- Profession: Attorney

Dudley Goodall Wooten (June 19, 1860 – February 7, 1929) was an American lawyer, jurist, and politician who served one term as a U.S. representative from Texas from 1901 to 1903.

== Early years ==
Born near Springfield, Missouri, Wooten moved in infancy with his parents to Texas during the Civil War.

== Education ==
He attended private schools in Paris, Texas, and graduated from Princeton University in 1875. He attended Johns Hopkins University, Baltimore, Maryland, and graduated from the law department of the University of Virginia at Charlottesville, where he won the school's highest awards for writing and debate and was a member of Phi Kappa Psi fraternity.

== Career ==
He was admitted to the bar in 1880 and practiced in Austin, Texas.

He served as prosecuting attorney of Austin from 1884 to 1886. He moved to Dallas, Texas, in 1888 and served as judge of the Dallas County district court from 1890 to 1892.

=== Texas legislature ===
He served as member of the State house of representatives in 1898 and 1899. As a member of the Texas legislature, Wooten served as delegate to the National Antitrust Conference at Chicago in 1899. He served as member of the executive council of the National Civic Federation in 1900.

=== Congress ===
Wooten was elected as a Democrat to the Fifty-seventh Congress to fill the vacancy caused by the death of Robert Emmet Burke and served from July 13, 1901, to March 3, 1903. In 1902 Wooten lost in his attempt to be nominated as the Democratic candidate for the house seat.

He served as delegate to the National Tax Conference at Buffalo in 1901. Congressman Wooten traveled to Alaska in 1902 to make a Congressional study of the needs of the territory.

== Later years ==
After leaving the house, Wooten resumed his law practice in Seattle, Washington. He served as special judge of the superior court at various times. He served as delegate to the National Rivers and Harbors Congress in 1912, and as delegate to the National Conservation Congress in 1913.

He was appointed a member of the State board of higher curricula by the Governor in 1919.

=== Academic career ===
Wooten worked as a professor of law at the University of Notre Dame, Notre Dame, Indiana from 1924 to 1928.

== Death ==
He died in Austin, Texas, on February 7, 1929.

== Fraternal memberships ==
- Phi Kappa Psi

== Bibliography ==
- Wooten, Dudley Goodall (1920). A noble Ursuline: Mother Mary Amadeus. The Paulist Press. ASIN: B00089VZVG.
- Wooten, Dudley Goodall (1987) [1898]. A Comprehensive History of Texas: 1685–1845 : 1845–1897 (The Fred H. and Ella Mae Moore Texas history reprint series). Reprint. Texas State Historical Assn. ISBN 978-0-87611-082-9.
- Wooten, Dudley Goodall (2010) [1899]. A Complete History of Texas for Schools, Colleges and General Use. Reprint. General Books LLC. ISBN 978-1-153-36840-7.

== Sources ==
- United States Congress. "Dudley G. Wooten (id: W000740)". Biographical Directory of the United States Congress.

U.S. House of Representatives
Preceded by Robert Emmet Burke	Member of the U.S. House of Representatives from Texas's 6th congressional district 1901–1903	Succeeded by Scott Field
