= Off-year election =

U.S. election held in an odd-numbered year

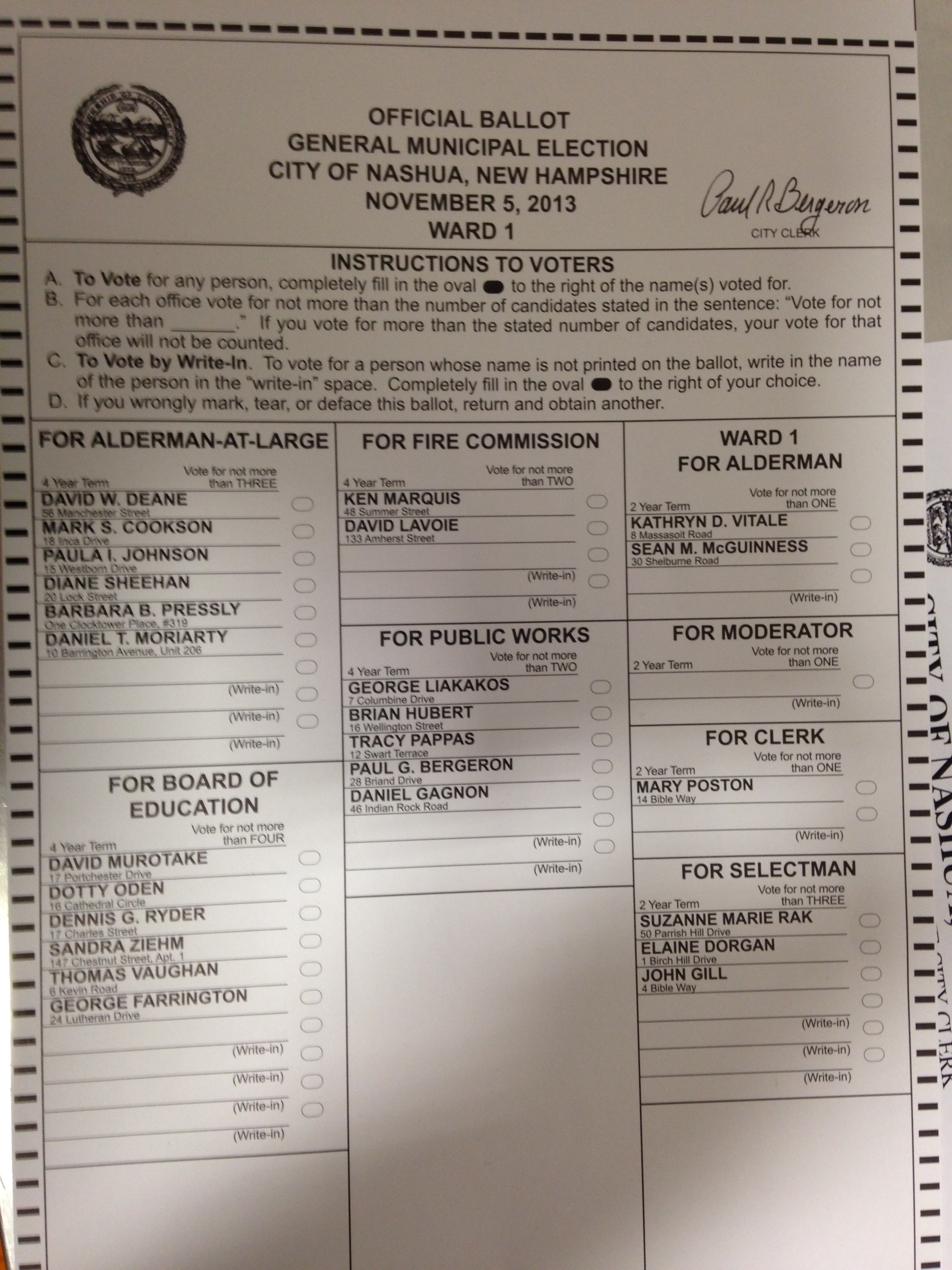
A 2013 general election ballot for the offices of Ward 1 of Nashua, New Hampshire

An off-year election in the United States is typically a general election held in an odd-numbered year when neither a presidential election nor a midterm election takes place. At times, the term "off-year" may also be used to refer to midterm election years, while the term "off-cycle" can also refer to any election held on another date than Election Day of an even-numbered year.

Off-year elections during odd-numbered years rarely feature any election to a federal office, few state legislative elections, and very few gubernatorial elections. Instead, the vast majority of these elections are held at the county and municipal level. On the ballot are many mayors, a wide variety of citizen and legislatively referred incentives and referendums in various states, and many more local public offices. They may also feature a number of special elections to fill vacancies in various federal, state, and local offices. Jurisdictions that hold off-year elections require more frequent voting than jurisdictions that consolidate elections in even-numbered years.

== Background and rationale ==
Off-year elections often feature far fewer races than either presidential or midterm elections and generate far lower voter turnout than even-numbered election years.

While the fixed-term elections for U.S. president have always been held on even-numbered years, this was not always the case for congressional elections. Before Congress began to standardize elections for the House of Representatives in 1872, individual states could schedule theirs into the first months of an odd-numbered year. Senate elections were more problematic prior to the ratification of the Seventeenth Amendment in 1913. Under the original rules of Article 1, Section 3 of the U.S. Constitution, senators were chosen by state legislatures instead of direct elections. This meant that they were affected by legislative deadlock, and seats would remain vacant for months or years until their state legislatures could agree on whom to send to the Senate.

The political calculations of incumbent politicians appears to be the most common thread over the years guiding decisions around election timing for the few states with off-year elections. The lower turnout also benefits well-organized special interest groups that often make up local political machines, making it easier for their favored candidates to capture more of a government. The lower turnout also results in a different age, partisan, and racial representation of voters who may generally vote differently in these years without a presidential or congressional coattail effect. Even though large majorities from both major political parties want to shift to on-cycle elections, these interest groups have used their political power to slow down some but not all of the reform efforts, with California, Arizona and Nevada seeing significant success in shifting local elections on-cycle. Nevertheless, an off-year election is regarded as an early indicator of how the rest of the country may vote in the next on-cycle election.

== Federal elections ==
Regularly scheduled elections for the Senate and the House of Representatives are always held in even-numbered years. Elections for these offices are only held during odd-numbered years if accommodating a special election—usually either due to incumbents resigning or dying while in office.

Special elections are never held for the U.S. president. If the president dies, resigns, or is (via impeachment conviction) removed from office, the successor is determined by the presidential line of succession, as specified by the United States Constitution and the Presidential Succession Act, and serves the rest of the presidential term.

== State elections ==
Five states elect their respective governors to four-year terms during off-year elections: Kentucky, Louisiana, Mississippi, New Jersey, and Virginia. Kentucky, Louisiana, and Mississippi hold their gubernatorial elections during the off-year before the presidential election; e.g. the 2023 elections. New Jersey and Virginia then hold theirs in the off-year after the presidential election; e.g. the 2025 elections.

Louisiana, Mississippi, New Jersey, and Virginia also hold off-year state legislative elections.

Off-years may also feature a wide variety of citizen and Legislative referred incentives and referendums in various states, as well as a number of special elections to fill various state offices. States may also allow recall elections, such as the 2021 California gubernatorial recall election.

== Local elections ==
Many races held during off-year, odd-numbered election years are for offices at the municipal and local level. Other municipalities and local governments instead consolidate their elections in even-numbered years to save costs, increase voter turnout, and have a far more representative group of voters.

== Comparison with other U.S. general elections ==
Basic rotation of U.S. general elections (fixed terms only^{[1]})
Year	2026	2027	2028	2029	2030
Type	Midterm	Off-year	Presidential	Off-year	Midterm
President	No		Yes	No	
Senate	Class II (33 seats)	No	Class III (34 seats)	No	Class I (33 seats)
House	All 435 seats^{[2]}	No	All 435 seats^{[3]}	No	All 435 seats^{[2]}
Gubernatorial	36 states, DC, & 3 territories^{[4]} AL, AK, AZ, AR, CA, CO, CT, FL, GA, HI, ID, IL, IA, KS, ME, MD, MA, MI, MN, NE, NV, NH, NM, NY, OH, OK, OR, PA, RI, SC, SD, TN, TX, VT, WI, WY, DC (Mayor), GU, MP, VI	3 states KY, LA, MS	11 states, 2 territories DE, IN, MO, MT, NH, NC, ND, UT, VT, WA, WV, AS, PR	2 states NJ, VA	36 states, DC, & 3 territories^{[4]} AL, AK, AZ, AR, CA, CO, CT, FL, GA, HI, ID, IL, IA, KS, ME, MD, MA, MI, MN, NE, NV, NH, NM, NY, OH, OK, OR, PA, RI, SC, SD, TN, TX, VT, WI, WY, DC (Mayor), GU, MP, VI
Lieutenant gubernatorial^{[5]}	10 states^{[6]} AL, AR, CA, GA, ID, NV, OK, RI, TX, VT	2 states LA, MS	5 states, 1 territory DE, MO, NC, VT, WA, AS	1 state VA	10 states^{[6]} AL, AR, CA, GA, ID, NV, OK, RI, TX, VT
Secretary of state	25 states AL, AZ, AR, CA, CO, CT, GA, ID, IL, IN, IA, KS, MA, MI, MN, NE, NV, NM, ND, OH, RI, SC, VT, WI, WY	3 states KY, LA, MS	7 states MO, MT, NC, OR, VT, WA, WV	None	25 states AL, AZ, AR, CA, CO, CT, GA, ID, IL, IN, IA, KS, MA, MI, MN, NE, NV, NM, ND, OH, RI, SC, VT, WI, WY
Attorney general	30 states, DC, & 2 territories AL, AZ, AR, CA, CO, CT, DE, FL, GA, ID, IL, IA, KS, MD, MA, MI, MN, NE, NV, NM, NY, ND, OH, OK, RI, SC, SD, TX, VT, WI, DC, GU, MP	3 states KY, LA, MS	10 states IN, MO, MT, NC, OR, PA, UT, VT, WA, WV	1 state VA	30 states, DC, & 2 territories AL, AZ, AR, CA, CO, CT, DE, FL, GA, ID, IL, IA, KS, MD, MA, MI, MN, NE, NV, NM, NY, ND, OH, OK, RI, SC, SD, TX, VT, WI, WY, DC, GU, MP
State treasurer^{[7]}	23 states AL, AZ, AR, CA, CO, CT, FL (CFO), ID, IL, IN, IA, KS, MA, NE, NV, NM, OH, OK, RI, SC, VT, WI, WY	3 states KY, LA, MS	9 states MO, NC, ND, OR, PA, UT, VT, WA, WV	None	23 states AL, AZ, AR, CA, CO, CT, FL (CFO), ID, IL, IN, IA, KS, MA, NE, NV, NM, OH, OK, RI, SC, VT, WI, WY
State comptroller/controller	8 states CA, CT, IL, MD, NV, NY, SC, TX	None	None	None	8 states CA, CT, IL, MD, NV, NY, SC, TX
State auditor	15 states AL, AR, DE, IN, IA, MA, MN, MO, NE, NM, OH, OK, SD, VT, WY	2 states KY, MS	9 states MT, NC, ND, PA, UT, VT, WA, WV, GU	None	15 states AL, AR, DE, IN, IA, MA, MN, MO, NE, NM, OH, OK, SD, VT, WY
Superintendent of public instruction	7 states AZ, CA, GA, ID, OK, SC, WY	None	4 states MT, NC, ND, WA	1 state WI	7 states AZ, CA, GA, ID, OK, SC, WY
Agriculture commissioner	6 states AL, FL, GA, IA, ND, SC, TX	3 states KY, LA, MS	2 states NC, WV	None	6 states AL, FL, GA, IA, ND, SC, TX
Insurance commissioner	5 states CA, DE, GA, KS, OK	2 states LA, MS	3 states NC, ND, WA	None	5 states CA, DE, GA, KS, OK
Other commissioners & elected officials	9 states AZ (Mine Inspector), AR (Land), GA (Labor), NM (Land), ND (Tax), OK (Labor), OR (Labor), SD (Land), TX (Land)	None	1 state NC (Labor)	None	9 states AZ (Mine Inspector), AR (Land), GA (Labor), NM (Land), ND (Tax), OK (Labor), OR (Labor), SD (Land), TX (Land)
State legislatures^{[8]}	46 states, DC, & 4 territories AK, AL, AZ, AR, CA, CO, CT, DE, FL, GA, HI, ID, IL, IN, IA, KS, KY, ME, MA, MD, MI, MN, MO, NE, NV, NH, NM, NY, NC, ND, OH, OK, OR, PA, RI, SC, SD, TN, TX, UT, VT, WA, WV, WI, WY, DC, AS, GU, MP, VI	4 states LA, MS, NJ, VA	44 states, DC, & 5 territories AK, AZ, AR, CA, CO, CT, DE, FL, GA, HI, ID, IL, IN, IA, KS, KY, ME, MA, MI, MN, MO, NE, NV, NH, NM, NY, NC, ND, OH, OK, OR, PA, RI, SC, SD, TN, TX, UT, VT, WA, WV, WI, WY, DC, AS, GU, MP, PR, VI	2 states VA. NJ	46 states, DC, & 4 territories AK, AL, AZ, AR, CA, CO, CT, DE, FL, GA, HI, ID, IL, IN, IA, KS, KY, ME, MA, MD, MI, MN, MO, NE, NV, NH, NM, NY, NC, ND, OH, OK, OR, PA, RI, SC, SD, TN, TX, UT, VT, WA, WV, WI, WY, DC, AS, GU, MP, VI
State boards of education^{[9]}	8 states, DC, & 3 territories AL, CO, KS, MI, NE, OH, TX, UT, DC, GU, MP, VI	None	8 states, DC, & 3 territories AL, CO, KS, MI, NE, OH, TX, UT, DC, GU, MP, VI	None	8 states, DC, & 3 territories AL, CO, KS, MI, NE, OH, TX, UT, DC, GU, MP, VI
Other state, local, and tribal offices	Varies				

^{1} This table does not include special elections, which may be held to fill political offices that have become vacant between the regularly scheduled elections.
^{2} As well as all six non-voting delegates of the U.S. House.
^{3} As well as five non-voting delegates of the U.S. House. The resident commissioner of Puerto Rico instead serves a four-year term that coincides with the presidential term.
^{4} The governors of New Hampshire and Vermont are each elected to two-year terms. The other 48 state governors and all five territorial governors serve four-year terms.
^{5} In 26 states and 3 territories the lieutenant governor is elected on the same ticket as the governor: AK, CO, CT, FL, HI, IL, IN, IA, KS, KY, MD, MA, MI, MN, MT, NE, NJ, NM, NY, ND, OH, PA, SC, SD, UT, WI, GU, MP, VI.
^{6} Like the governor, Vermont's other officials are each elected to two-year terms. All other state officers for all other states listed serve four-year terms.
^{7} In some states, the comptroller or controller has the duties equivalent to a treasurer. There are some states with both positions, so both have been included separately.
^{8} This list does not differentiate chambers of each legislature. Forty-nine state legislatures are bicameral; Nebraska is unicameral. Additionally, Washington, DC, Guam, and the US Virgin Islands are unicameral; the other territories are bicameral. All legislatures have varying terms for their members. Many have two-year terms for the lower house and four-year terms for the upper house. Some have all two-year terms and some all four-year terms. Arkansas has a combination of both two- and four-year terms in the same chamber.
^{9} Most states not listed here have a board appointed by the governor and legislature. All boards listed here have members that serve four-year staggered terms, except Colorado, which has six-year terms, and Guam, which has two-year terms. Most are elected statewide, some are elected from districts. Louisiana, Ohio, Guam, and the Northern Mariana Islands have additional members who are appointed.

== See also ==
- Primary election
- Recall election
- Runoff election

== Works cited ==
- Anzia, Sarah F. (2013). Timing and Turnout: How Off-Cycle Elections Favor Organized Groups. University of Chicago Press. ISBN 978-0-226-08695-8.
