= Elections in the United States =

Elections in the United States are held for government officials at the federal, state, and local levels, to perform political representation.

At the federal level, the nation's head of state, the president, is elected indirectly by the people of each state, through an Electoral College. Today, these electors almost always are elected by the popular vote of their state and in turn vote in line with those voters' preference (exceptions include faithless electors). Members of the federal legislature, the Congress, are directly elected by the people of each state (but the voters in most states are divided into electoral districts). There are many elected offices at state level, each state having at least an elective governor and legislature. There are also elected offices at the local level, in counties, cities, towns, townships, boroughs, and villages; as well as for special districts and school districts which may transcend county and municipal boundaries.

The various elections are sometimes all printed on one ballot in what is called a "long ballot", with the voter sometimes having to mark a vote in as many as 37 separate contests on the one ballot.

The country's election system is highly decentralized. While the U.S. Constitution sets parameters for the election of federal officials, state law, not federal, regulates most aspects of elections in the U.S., including primary elections, the eligibility of voters (beyond the basic constitutional definition), the method of choosing presidential electors, as well as the running of state and local elections. All elections—federal, state, and local—are administered by the individual states, with many aspects of the system's operations delegated to the county or local level.

Under federal law, the general elections of the president and Congress occur on Election Day, the Tuesday after the first Monday of November. These federal general elections are held in even-numbered years, with presidential elections occurring every four years, and congressional elections occurring every two years. The general elections that are held two years after the presidential ones are referred to as the midterm elections. General elections for state and local offices are held at the discretion of the individual state and local governments, with many of these races coinciding with either presidential or midterm elections as a matter of convenience and cost saving, while other state and local races may occur during odd-numbered "off years". The date when primary elections for federal, state, and local races occur are also at the discretion of the individual state and local governments; presidential primaries in particular have historically been staggered between the states, beginning sometime in January or February, and ending about mid-June before the November general election.

The restriction and extension of voting rights to different groups has been a contested process throughout United States history. The federal government has also been involved in attempts to increase voter turnout, by measures such as the Short ballot reform and the National Voter Registration Act of 1993. The financing of elections has also long been controversial, because private sources make up substantial amounts of campaign contributions, especially in federal elections. Voluntary public funding for candidates willing to accept spending limits was introduced in 1974 for presidential primaries and elections. The Federal Election Commission, created in 1975 by an amendment to the Federal Election Campaign Act, has the responsibility to disclose campaign finance information, to enforce the provisions of the law such as the limits and prohibitions on contributions, and to oversee the public funding of U.S. presidential elections.

Voting in the United States is currently voluntary at the federal, state and local levels. Efforts to make voting mandatory have been proposed.

== Election methods ==
Voting systems used in each state: First past the post (FPTP) Two-round system (TRS) Instant-runoff voting (IRV) Nonpartisan blanket primary and top two runoff general Louisiana primary Nonpartisan blanket primary and top four instant-runoff general

Jurisdictions in the United States use different election methods. The most common is the first-past-the-post system, where the highest-polling candidate wins the election. Under this system, a candidate who achieves a plurality of votes (more than any other single candidate) wins.

The State of Georgia uses a two-round system, where if no candidate receives a majority of votes, there is a runoff between the two highest polling candidates.

Since 2002, several cities have adopted instant-runoff voting and single transferable voting. Under both systems, voters rank candidates in order of preference rather than marking just one preference for a single candidate. Under the IRV system, if no candidate wins in first count by achieving more than half of votes, the lowest polling candidate is eliminated, and their votes are distributed to the next preferred candidate. This process continues until a candidate achieves more than half the votes, or votes still in play at that point. In 2016, Maine became the first state to adopt instant-runoff voting (known in the state as ranked-choice voting) statewide for its elections, although due to state constitutional provisions, the system is only used for federal elections and state primaries. Single transferable voting (STV) operates in many ways the same as IRV except that it elects multiple members in one contest. Cambridge, Mass. and Portland, Oregon elect their city councillors through STV.

Districting also varies, with some states using state-wide districts and others such as Maine using a combination of a state-wide district and congressional districts within the state. The districts may elect just one member or elect several members.

== Voting ==
=== Eligibility ===
The eligibility of an individual for voting is set out in the constitution and also regulated at state level. The constitution states that suffrage cannot be denied on grounds of race or color, sex, or age for citizens eighteen years or older. Beyond these basic qualifications, it is the responsibility of state legislatures to regulate voter eligibility. Some states ban convicted criminals, especially felons, from voting for a fixed period of time or indefinitely. The number of American adults who are currently or permanently ineligible to vote due to felony convictions is estimated to be 5.3 million. Some states also have legacy constitutional statements barring those legally declared incompetent from voting; such references are generally considered obsolete and are being considered for review or removal where they appear.

About 4.3 million American citizens that reside in Washington, D.C., Puerto Rico and other U.S. territories do not have the same level of federal representation as those that reside in the 50 U.S. states. These areas only have non-voting members in the U.S. House of Representatives and no representation in the U.S. Senate. Citizens in the U.S. territories are also not represented in the Electoral College and therefore cannot vote for the president. Those in Washington, D.C. are permitted to vote for the president because of the Twenty-third Amendment.

=== Voter registration ===
While the federal government has jurisdiction over federal elections, most election laws are decided at the state level. All U.S. states except North Dakota require that citizens who wish to vote be registered. In many states, voter registration takes place at the county or municipal level. Traditionally, voters had to register directly at state or local offices to vote, but in the mid-1990s, efforts were made by the federal government to make registering easier, in an attempt to increase turnout. The National Voter Registration Act of 1993 (the "Motor Voter" law) required state governments that receive certain types of federal funding to make the voter registration process easier by providing uniform registration services through drivers' license registration centers, disability centers, schools, libraries, and mail-in registration. Other states allow citizens same-day registration on Election Day.

An estimated 50 million Americans are unregistered. It has been reported that registering to vote poses greater obstacles for low-income citizens, racial minorities and linguistic minorities, Native Americans, and persons with disabilities. International election observers have called on authorities in the U.S. to implement measures to remediate the high number of unregistered citizens.

In many states, citizens registering to vote may declare an affiliation with a political party. This declaration of affiliation does not cost money, and does not make the citizen a dues-paying member of a party. A party cannot prevent a voter from declaring his or her affiliation with them, but it can refuse requests for full membership. In some states, only voters affiliated with a party may vote in that party's primary elections (see below). Declaring a party affiliation is never required. Some states, including Georgia, Michigan, Minnesota, Virginia, Wisconsin, and Washington, practice non-partisan registration.

==== Noncitizen voting ====
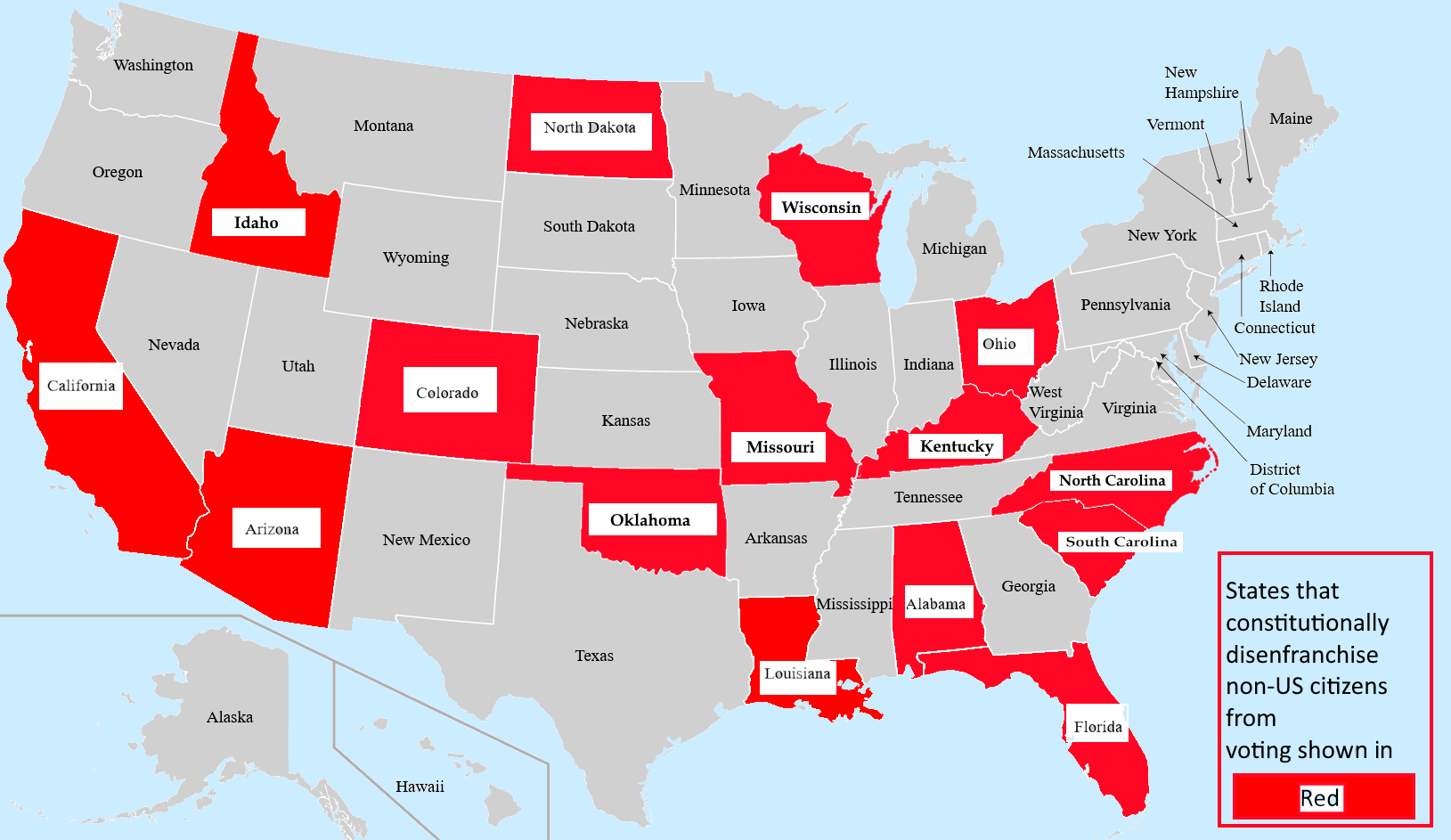
Map of US States where in their constitutions they specify that only U.S. citizens can vote as of 2025

Federal law prohibits noncitizens from voting in federal elections.

As of 2024, 7 state constitutions specifically state that "only" a citizen can vote in elections at any level in that state: Alabama, Arizona, Colorado, Florida, Louisiana, North Dakota, and Ohio.

=== Voter ID laws ===
Voter ID laws by state, as of March 2025: Photo ID required (strict) Photo ID requested (non-strict) Non-photo ID required (strict) Non-photo ID requested (non-strict) No ID required to vote

Voter ID laws in the United States are laws that require a person to provide some form of official identification before they are permitted to register to vote, receive a ballot for an election, or to actually vote in elections in the United States.

Proponents of voter ID laws argue that they reduce electoral fraud while placing only little burden on voters. Critics worry the costs to voters without IDs will outweigh unclear benefits it would have on real or perceived fraud.

=== Absentee and mail voting ===
Sorting vote by mail envelopes, San Jose, Santa Clara County, California, 2018

Voters unable or unwilling to vote at polling stations on Election Day may vote via absentee ballots, depending on state law. Originally these ballots were for people who could not go to the polling place on election day. Now some states let them be used for convenience, but state laws still call them absentee ballots. Absentee ballots can be sent and returned by mail, or requested and submitted in person, or dropped off in locked boxes. About half the states and territories allow "no excuse absentee," where no reason is required to request an absentee ballot; others require a valid reason, such as infirmity or travel. Some states let voters with permanent disabilities apply for permanent absentee voter status, and some other states let all citizens apply for permanent status, so they will automatically receive an absentee ballot for each election. Otherwise a voter must request an absentee ballot before the election occurs.

In Colorado, Hawaii, Oregon, Utah and Washington state, all ballots are delivered through the mail; in many other states there are counties or certain small elections where everyone votes by mail.

As of July 2020, 26 states allow designated agents to collect and submit ballots on behalf of another voter, whose identities are specified on a signed application. Usually such agents are family members or persons from the same residence. 13 states neither enable nor prohibit ballot collection as a matter of law. Among those that allow it, 12 have limits on how many ballots an agent may collect.

Americans living outside the United States, including active duty members of the armed forces stationed outside of their state of residency, may register and vote under the Uniformed and Overseas Citizens Absentee Voting Act (UOCAVA). Almost half the states require these ballots to be returned by mail. Other states allow mail along with some combination of fax, or email; four states allow a web portal.

A significant measure to prevent some types of fraud has been to require the voter's signature on the outer envelope, which is compared to one or more signatures on file before taking the ballot out of the envelope and counting it. Not all states have standards for signature review. There have been concerns that signatures are improperly rejected from young and minority voters at higher rates than others, with no or limited ability of voters to appeal the rejection. For other types of errors, experts estimate that while there is more fraud with absentee ballots than in-person voting, it has affected only a few local elections.

Following the 2020 United States presidential election, amidst disputes of its outcome, as a rationale behind litigation demanding a halt to official vote counting in some areas, allegations were made that vote counting is offshored. Former Trump Administration official Chris Krebs, head of the Cybersecurity and Infrastructure Security Agency (CISA) during the election, said in a December 2020 interview that, "All votes in the United States of America are counted in the United States of America."

One documented trend is that in-person votes and early votes are more likely to lean to the Republican Party, while the provisional ballots, which are counted later, trend to the Democratic Party. This phenomenon is known as blue shift, and has led to situations where Republicans were winning on election night only to be overtaken by Democrats after all votes were counted. Foley did not find that mail-in or absentee votes favored either party.

=== Early voting ===
Early voting is a formal process where voters can cast their ballots prior to the official Election Day. Early voting in person is allowed in 47 states and in Washington, D.C., with no excuse required. Only Alabama, New Hampshire and Oregon do not allow early voting, while some counties in Idaho do not allow it.

=== Voting equipment ===
Prevalence of voting technology in the US in 1980 and 2008
Voting technology	1980 prevalence	2008 prevalence
Hand-counted paper ballot	10%	< 1%
Lever machine	40%	6%
Punch card	~33%	Negligible
Optical scan	2%	60%
DRE	< 1%	~33–38%

The earliest voting in the US was through paper ballots on which a voter recorded a name or some identifier of the preference and then were hand-counted. By the late 1800s, paper ballots printed by election officials were nearly universal. By 1980, 10% of American voters used paper ballots that were counted by hand, which dropped below 1% by 2008.

Mechanical voting machines were first used in the US in the 1892 elections in Lockport, New York. The state of Massachusetts was one of the first states to adopt lever voting machines, doing so in 1899, but the state's Supreme Judicial Court ruled their usage unconstitutional in 1907. Lever machines grew in popularity despite controversies, with about two-thirds of votes for president in the 1964 United States presidential election cast with lever machines. Lever machine use declined to about 40% of votes in 1980, then 6% in 2008. Punch card voting equipment was developed in the 1960s, with about one-third of votes cast with punch cards in 1980. New York was the last state to phase out lever voting in response to the 2000 Help America Vote Act (HAVA), which allocated funds for the replacement of lever machine and punch card voting equipment. (This innovation helped cause the "hanging chad" scandal of 2000.)

New York replaced its lever voting with optical scanning in 2010.

In the 1960s, technology was developed that enabled paper ballots filled with pencil or ink to be optically scanned rather than hand-counted. In 1980, about 2% of votes used optical scanning; this increased to 30% by 2000 and 60% by 2008. In the 1970s, the final major voting technology for the US was developed, the DRE voting machine. In 1980, less than 1% of ballots were cast with DRE. Prevalence grew to 10% in 2000, then peaked at 38% in 2006. DREs are fully digital, with no paper trail of votes, and backlash against them caused their use to drop to 33% in 2010.

The voting equipment used by a given US county is related to the county's historical wealth. A county's use of punch cards in the year 2000 was positively correlated with the county's wealth in 1969, when punch card machines were at their peak of popularity. Counties with higher wealth in 1989 were less likely to still use punch cards in 2000. This supports the idea that punch cards were used in counties that were well-off in the 1960s, but whose wealth declined in the proceeding decades. Counties that maintained their wealth from the 1960s onwards could afford to replace punch card machines as they fell out of favor.

== Levels of election ==
=== Federal elections ===
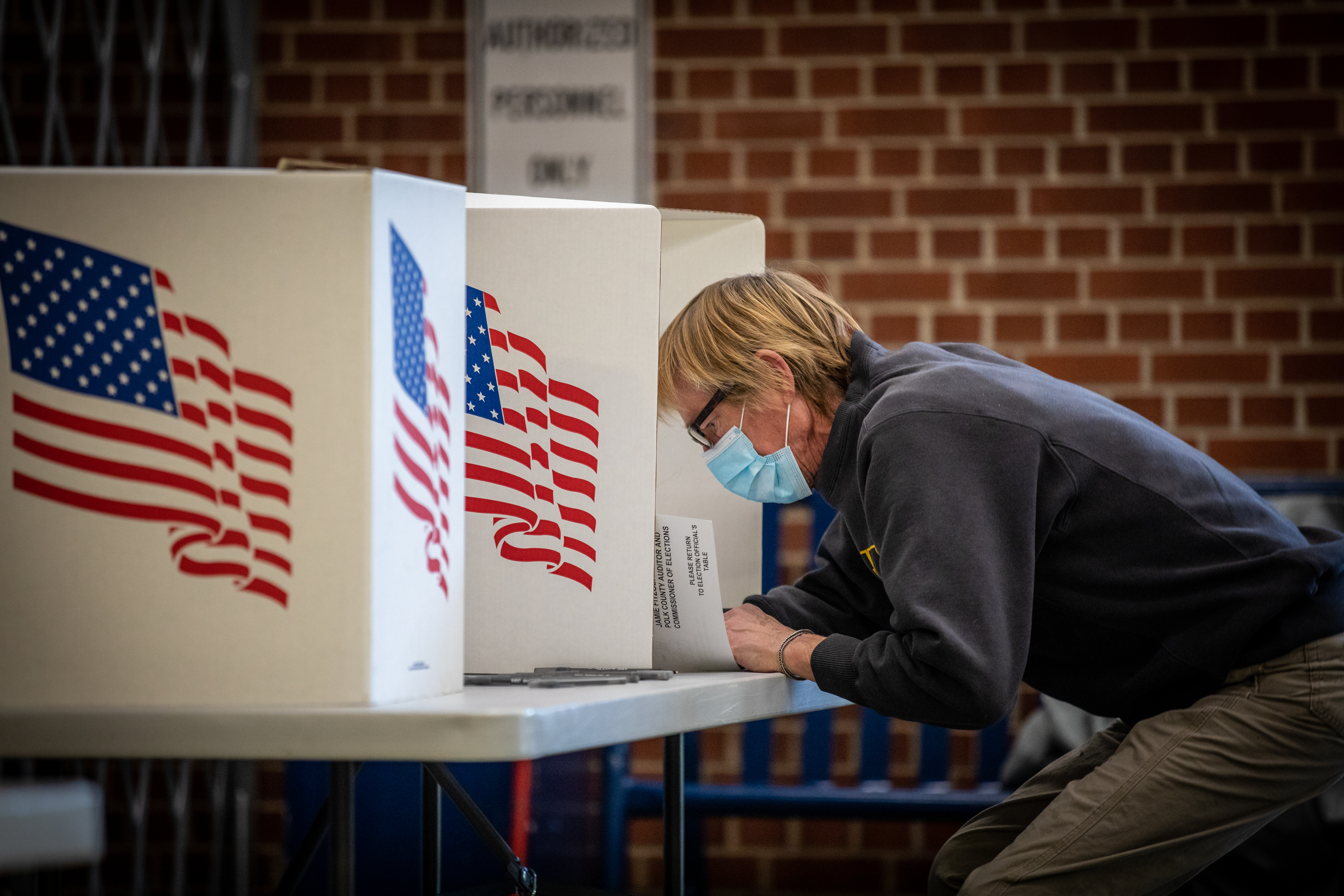
Voters cast ballots for the 2020 elections at Theodore Roosevelt High School in Des Moines, Iowa.

The United States has a presidential system of government, which means that the executive and legislature are elected separately. Article II of the United States Constitution requires that the election of the U.S. president by the Electoral College must occur on a single day throughout the country; Article I established that elections for Congressional offices, however, can be held at different times. Congressional and presidential elections take place simultaneously every four years, and the intervening Congressional elections, which take place every two years, are called midterm elections.

The constitution states that members of the United States House of Representatives must be at least 25 years old, a citizen of the United States for at least seven years, and be a (legal) inhabitant of the state they represent. Senators must be at least 30 years old, a citizen of the United States for at least nine years, and be a (legal) inhabitant of the state they represent. The president and vice president must be at least 35 years old, a natural born citizen of the United States, and a resident in the United States for at least fourteen years. It is the responsibility of state legislatures to regulate the qualifications for a candidate appearing on a ballot paper, although in order to get onto the ballot, a candidate must often collect a legally defined number of signatures or meet other state-specific requirements.

==== Presidential elections ====
The president and the vice president are elected together in a presidential election. It is an indirect election, with the winner being determined by votes cast by electors of the Electoral College. In modern times, voters in each state select a slate of electors from a list of several slates designated by different parties or candidates, and the electors typically promise in advance to vote for the candidates of their party (whose names of the presidential candidates usually appear on the ballot rather than those of the individual electors). The winner of the election is the candidate with at least 270 Electoral College votes. It is possible for a candidate to win the electoral vote, and lose the (nationwide) popular vote (receive fewer votes nationwide than the second ranked candidate). This has occurred five times in US history: in 1824, 1876, 1888, 2000, and 2016. Prior to ratification of the Twelfth Amendment to the United States Constitution (1804), the runner-up in a presidential election became the vice president.

Electoral College votes are cast by individual states by a group of electors; each elector casts one electoral college vote. Until the Twenty-third Amendment to the United States Constitution of 1961, citizens from the District of Columbia did not have representation in the electoral college. In modern times, with electors usually committed to vote for a party candidate in advance, electors that vote against the popular vote in their state are called faithless electors, and occurrences are rare. State law regulates how states cast their electoral college votes. In all states except Maine and Nebraska, the candidate that wins the most votes in the state receives all its electoral college votes (a "winner takes all" system). From 1972 in Maine, and from 1996 in Nebraska, two electoral votes are awarded based on the winner of the statewide election, and the rest (two in Maine and three in Nebraska) go to the highest vote-winner in each of the state's congressional districts.

==== Congressional elections ====
Congress has two chambers: the Senate and the House of Representatives.

===== Senate elections =====
The Senate has 100 members, elected for a six-year term in dual-seat constituencies (2 from each state), with one-third being renewed every two years. The group of the Senate seats that is up for election during a given year is known as a "class"; the three classes are staggered so that only one of the three groups is renewed every two years. Until the Seventeenth Amendment to the United States Constitution in 1913, states chose how to elect Senators, and they were often elected by state legislatures, not the electorate of states.

===== House of Representatives elections =====
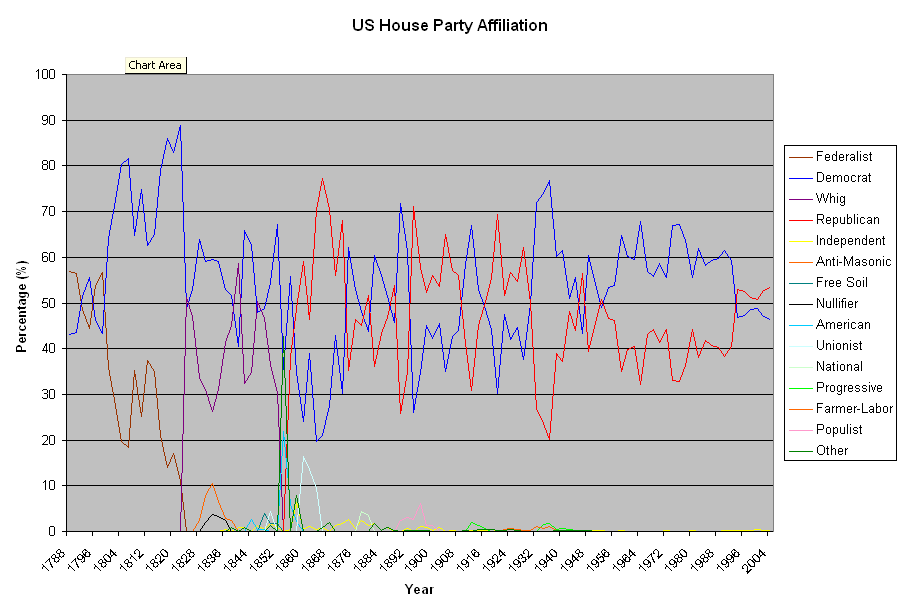
A chart of party balance in the House from 1789 to 2004

The House of Representatives has 435 members, elected for a two-year term in single-seat constituencies. House of Representatives elections are held every two years on the first Tuesday after November 1 in even years. Special House elections can occur between if a member dies or resigns during a term. House elections are first-past-the-post elections that elect a Representative from each of 435 House districts that cover the United States. The non-voting delegates of Washington, D.C., and the territories of American Samoa, Guam, the Northern Mariana Islands, Puerto Rico and the United States Virgin Islands are also elected.

House elections occur every two years, correlated with presidential elections or halfway through a president's term. The House delegate of Puerto Rico, officially known as the resident commissioner of Puerto Rico, is elected to a four-year term, coinciding with those of the President.

As the redistricting commissions of states are often partisan, districts are often drawn which benefit incumbents. An increasing trend has been for incumbents to have an overwhelming advantage in House elections, and since the 1994 election, an unusually low number of seats has changed hands in each election. Due to gerrymandering, fewer than 10% of all House seats are contested in each election cycle. Over 90% of House members are reelected every two years, due to lack of electoral competition. Gerrymandering of the House, combined with the general deficiencies of the first-past-the-post voting system, and divisions inherent in the design of the Senate and of the Electoral College, result in a discrepancy between the percentage of popular support for various political parties and the actual level of the parties' representation. In particular, gerrymandering has been found to benefit the Republican Party more than it does the Democratic Party.

=== State elections ===
State law and state constitutions, controlled by state legislatures regulate elections at state level and local level. Various officials at state level are elected. Since the separation of powers applies to states as well as the federal government, state legislatures and the executive (the governor) are elected separately. Governors and lieutenant governors are elected in all states, in some states on a joint ticket and in some states separately, some separately in different electoral cycles. The governors of the territories of American Samoa, Guam, the Northern Mariana Islands, Puerto Rico and the United States Virgin Islands are also elected. In some states, executive positions such as Attorney General and Secretary of State are also elected offices, as well as some quasi-judicial commissions such as public utilities commissions and governing boards of public higher education systems. All members of state legislatures and territorial jurisdiction legislatures are elected. In some states, members of the state supreme court and other members of the state judiciary are elected. Proposals to amend the state constitution are also placed on the ballot in some states.

As a matter of convenience and cost saving, elections for many of these state and local offices are held at the same time as either the federal presidential or midterm elections. There are a handful of states, however, that instead hold their elections during odd-numbered "off years."

=== Local elections ===
At the local level, county and city government positions are usually filled by election, especially within the legislative branch. The extent to which offices in the executive or judicial branches are elected vary from county-to-county or city-to-city. Some examples of local elected positions include sheriffs at the county level, court clerks at the judicial circuit level, and mayors and school board members at the city level. Districts for judicial, educational and other bodies may not be coterminous with county or municipal boundaries. Like state elections, an election for a specific local office may be held at the same time as either the presidential, midterm, or off-year elections.

=== Tribal elections ===
Many Native American tribal governmental positions, including executive and legislative positions, are typically filled by election. In some cases, tribal citizens elect council members who elect from among their body a chief executive. The number of positions and titles used vary from one tribal government to another, but common titles for the tribal government's chief executive terms include president, governor, principal chief, chair, and chief. These elections may be held in conjunction with federal, state, or local elections, but are often held independently under the authority of the tribe's office of elections.

== Comparison of recent and upcoming election years ==
Basic rotation of U.S. general elections (fixed terms only^{[1]})
Year	2026	2027	2028	2029	2030
Type	Midterm	Off-year	Presidential	Off-year	Midterm
President	No		Yes	No	
Senate	Class II (33 seats)	No	Class III (34 seats)	No	Class I (33 seats)
House	All 435 seats^{[2]}	No	All 435 seats^{[3]}	No	All 435 seats^{[2]}
Gubernatorial	36 states, DC, & 3 territories^{[4]} AL, AK, AZ, AR, CA, CO, CT, FL, GA, HI, ID, IL, IA, KS, ME, MD, MA, MI, MN, NE, NV, NH, NM, NY, OH, OK, OR, PA, RI, SC, SD, TN, TX, VT, WI, WY, DC (Mayor), GU, MP, VI	3 states KY, LA, MS	11 states, 2 territories DE, IN, MO, MT, NH, NC, ND, UT, VT, WA, WV, AS, PR	2 states NJ, VA	36 states, DC, & 3 territories^{[4]} AL, AK, AZ, AR, CA, CO, CT, FL, GA, HI, ID, IL, IA, KS, ME, MD, MA, MI, MN, NE, NV, NH, NM, NY, OH, OK, OR, PA, RI, SC, SD, TN, TX, VT, WI, WY, DC (Mayor), GU, MP, VI
Lieutenant gubernatorial^{[5]}	10 states^{[6]} AL, AR, CA, GA, ID, NV, OK, RI, TX, VT	2 states LA, MS	5 states, 1 territory DE, MO, NC, VT, WA, AS	1 state VA	10 states^{[6]} AL, AR, CA, GA, ID, NV, OK, RI, TX, VT
Secretary of state	25 states AL, AZ, AR, CA, CO, CT, GA, ID, IL, IN, IA, KS, MA, MI, MN, NE, NV, NM, ND, OH, RI, SC, VT, WI, WY	3 states KY, LA, MS	7 states MO, MT, NC, OR, VT, WA, WV	None	25 states AL, AZ, AR, CA, CO, CT, GA, ID, IL, IN, IA, KS, MA, MI, MN, NE, NV, NM, ND, OH, RI, SC, VT, WI, WY
Attorney general	30 states, DC, & 2 territories AL, AZ, AR, CA, CO, CT, DE, FL, GA, ID, IL, IA, KS, MD, MA, MI, MN, NE, NV, NM, NY, ND, OH, OK, RI, SC, SD, TX, VT, WI, DC, GU, MP	3 states KY, LA, MS	10 states IN, MO, MT, NC, OR, PA, UT, VT, WA, WV	1 state VA	30 states, DC, & 2 territories AL, AZ, AR, CA, CO, CT, DE, FL, GA, ID, IL, IA, KS, MD, MA, MI, MN, NE, NV, NM, NY, ND, OH, OK, RI, SC, SD, TX, VT, WI, WY, DC, GU, MP
State treasurer^{[7]}	23 states AL, AZ, AR, CA, CO, CT, FL (CFO), ID, IL, IN, IA, KS, MA, NE, NV, NM, OH, OK, RI, SC, VT, WI, WY	3 states KY, LA, MS	9 states MO, NC, ND, OR, PA, UT, VT, WA, WV	None	23 states AL, AZ, AR, CA, CO, CT, FL (CFO), ID, IL, IN, IA, KS, MA, NE, NV, NM, OH, OK, RI, SC, VT, WI, WY
State comptroller/controller	8 states CA, CT, IL, MD, NV, NY, SC, TX	None	None	None	8 states CA, CT, IL, MD, NV, NY, SC, TX
State auditor	15 states AL, AR, DE, IN, IA, MA, MN, MO, NE, NM, OH, OK, SD, VT, WY	2 states KY, MS	9 states MT, NC, ND, PA, UT, VT, WA, WV, GU	None	15 states AL, AR, DE, IN, IA, MA, MN, MO, NE, NM, OH, OK, SD, VT, WY
Superintendent of public instruction	7 states AZ, CA, GA, ID, OK, SC, WY	None	4 states MT, NC, ND, WA	1 state WI	7 states AZ, CA, GA, ID, OK, SC, WY
Agriculture commissioner	6 states AL, FL, GA, IA, ND, SC, TX	3 states KY, LA, MS	2 states NC, WV	None	6 states AL, FL, GA, IA, ND, SC, TX
Insurance commissioner	5 states CA, DE, GA, KS, OK	2 states LA, MS	3 states NC, ND, WA	None	5 states CA, DE, GA, KS, OK
Other commissioners & elected officials	10 states AZ (Mine Inspector), AR (Land), GA (Labor), NM (Land), ND (Tax), OK (Labor), OR (Labor), SD (Land), TX (Land), WA (Land)	None	1 state NC (Labor)	None	10 states AZ (Mine Inspector), AR (Land), GA (Labor), NM (Land), ND (Tax), OK (Labor), OR (Labor), SD (Land), TX (Land), WA (Land)
State legislatures^{[8]}	46 states, DC, & 4 territories AK, AL, AZ, AR, CA, CO, CT, DE, FL, GA, HI, ID, IL, IN, IA, KS, KY, ME, MA, MD, MI, MN, MO, NE, NV, NH, NM, NY, NC, ND, OH, OK, OR, PA, RI, SC, SD, TN, TX, UT, VT, WA, WV, WI, WY, DC, AS, GU, MP, VI	4 states LA, MS, NJ, VA	44 states, DC, & 5 territories AK, AZ, AR, CA, CO, CT, DE, FL, GA, HI, ID, IL, IN, IA, KS, KY, ME, MA, MI, MN, MO, NE, NV, NH, NM, NY, NC, ND, OH, OK, OR, PA, RI, SC, SD, TN, TX, UT, VT, WA, WV, WI, WY, DC, AS, GU, MP, PR, VI	2 states VA. NJ	46 states, DC, & 4 territories AK, AL, AZ, AR, CA, CO, CT, DE, FL, GA, HI, ID, IL, IN, IA, KS, KY, ME, MA, MD, MI, MN, MO, NE, NV, NH, NM, NY, NC, ND, OH, OK, OR, PA, RI, SC, SD, TN, TX, UT, VT, WA, WV, WI, WY, DC, AS, GU, MP, VI
State boards of education^{[9]}	8 states, DC, & 3 territories AL, CO, KS, MI, NE, OH, TX, UT, DC, GU, MP, VI	None	8 states, DC, & 3 territories AL, CO, KS, MI, NE, OH, TX, UT, DC, GU, MP, VI	None	8 states, DC, & 3 territories AL, CO, KS, MI, NE, OH, TX, UT, DC, GU, MP, VI
Other state, local, and tribal offices	Varies				

^{1} This table does not include special elections, which may be held to fill political offices that have become vacant between the regularly scheduled elections.
^{2} As well as all six non-voting delegates of the U.S. House.
^{3} As well as five non-voting delegates of the U.S. House. The resident commissioner of Puerto Rico instead serves a four-year term that coincides with the presidential term.
^{4} The governors of New Hampshire and Vermont are each elected to two-year terms. The other 48 state governors and all five territorial governors serve four-year terms.
^{5} In 26 states and 3 territories the lieutenant governor is elected on the same ticket as the governor: AK, CO, CT, FL, HI, IL, IN, IA, KS, KY, MD, MA, MI, MN, MT, NE, NJ, NM, NY, ND, OH, PA, SC, SD, UT, WI, GU, MP, VI.
^{6} Like the governor, Vermont's other officials are each elected to two-year terms. All other state officers for all other states listed serve four-year terms.
^{7} In some states, the comptroller or controller has the duties equivalent to a treasurer. There are some states with both positions, so both have been included separately.
^{8} This list does not differentiate chambers of each legislature. Forty-nine state legislatures are bicameral; Nebraska is unicameral. Additionally, Washington, DC, Guam, and the US Virgin Islands are unicameral; the other territories are bicameral. All legislatures have varying terms for their members. Many have two-year terms for the lower house and four-year terms for the upper house. Some have all two-year terms and some all four-year terms. Arkansas has a combination of both two- and four-year terms in the same chamber.
^{9} Most states not listed here have a board appointed by the governor and legislature. All boards listed here have members that serve four-year staggered terms, except Colorado, which has six-year terms, and Guam, which has two-year terms. Most are elected statewide, some are elected from districts. Louisiana, Ohio, Guam, and the Northern Mariana Islands have additional members who are appointed.

== Features of the election system ==
=== Multiple levels of regulation ===
In the US, elections are actually conducted by local authorities, working under local, state, and federal law and regulation, as well as the US Constitution. It is a highly decentralized system.

In around half of US states, the secretary of state is the official in charge of elections; in other states it is someone appointed for the job, or a commission. It is this person or commission who is responsible for certifying, tabulating, and reporting votes for the state.

=== Party systems ===
Americans vote for a specific candidate instead of directly selecting a particular political party. The United States Constitution has never formally addressed the issue of political parties. The Founding Fathers such as Alexander Hamilton and James Madison did not support domestic Political factions at the time the Constitution was written. In addition, the first president of the United States, George Washington, was not a member of any political party at the time of his election or throughout his tenure as president. Furthermore, he hoped that political parties would not be formed, fearing conflict and stagnation. Nevertheless, the beginnings of the American two-party system emerged from his immediate circle of advisers, with Hamilton and Madison ending up being the core leaders in this emerging party system. Due to Duverger's law, the two-party system continued following the creation of political parties, as the first-past-the-post electoral system was kept.

Candidates decide to run under a party label, register to run, pay filing fees, etc. In the primary elections, the party organization stays neutral until one candidate has been elected. The platform of the party is written by the winning candidate (in presidential elections; in other elections no platform is involved). Candidates formally manage the campaign and fund raising organization independent of the party. The primary elections in the main parties are organized by the states, who also register the party affiliation of the voters (this also makes it easier to gerrymander the congressional districts). The party is thus little more than a campaign organization for the main elections.

However, elections in the United States often do become de facto national races between the political parties. In what is known as "presidential coattails", candidates in presidential elections usually bring out supporters who then vote for his or her party's candidates for other offices, usually resulting in the presidential winner's party gaining seats in Congress. On the other hand, midterm elections are sometimes regarded as a referendum on the sitting president or incumbent party's performance.

=== Ballot access ===
Ballot access refers to the laws which regulate under what conditions access is granted for a candidate or political party to appear on voters' ballots. Each state has its own ballot access laws to determine who may appear on ballots, with some states having extremely difficult requirements. According to Article I, Section 4, of the United States Constitution, the authority to regulate the time, place, and manner of federal elections is up to each State, unless Congress legislates otherwise. Depending on the office and the state, it may be possible for a voter to cast a write-in vote for a candidate whose name does not appear on the ballot, but it is extremely rare for such a candidate to win office.

=== Campaign finance ===
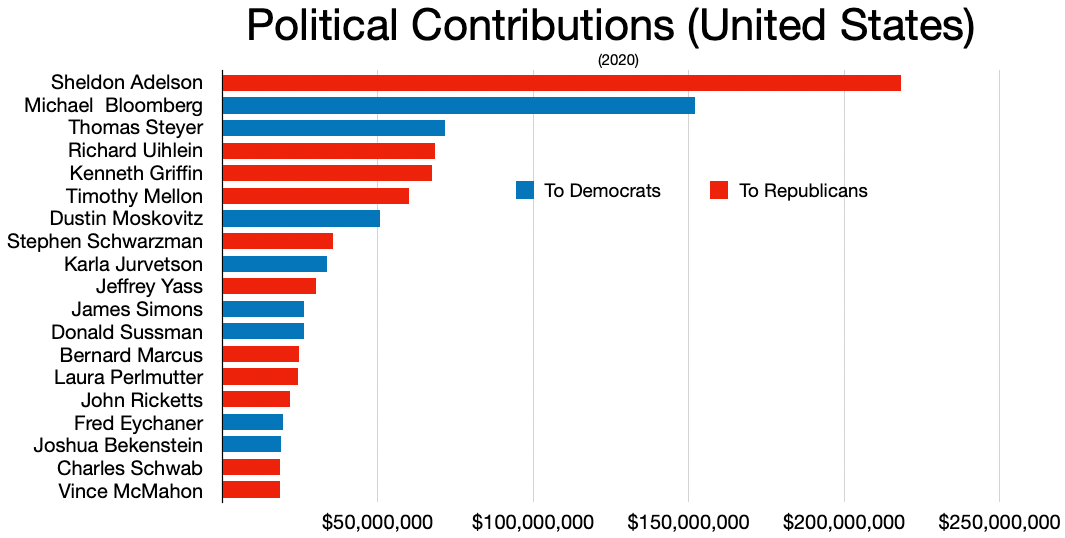
Political donations by major donors in the US 2020 elections

The funding of electoral campaigns has always been a controversial issue in American politics. Infringement of free speech (First Amendment) is an argument against restrictions on campaign contributions, while allegations of corruption arising from unlimited contributions and the need for political equality are arguments for the other side. Private funds are a major source of finance, from individuals and organizations. The first attempt to regulate campaign finance by legislation was in 1867, but major legislation, with the intention to widely enforce, on campaign finance was not introduced until the 1970s.

Money contributed to campaigns can be classified into "hard money" and "soft money". Hard money is money contributed directly to a campaign, by an individual or organization. Soft money is money from an individual or organization not contributed to a campaign, but spent in candidate specific advertising or other efforts that benefits that candidate by groups supporting the candidate, but legally not coordinated by the official campaign.

The Federal Election Campaign Act of 1971 required candidates to disclose sources of campaign contributions and campaign expenditure. It was amended in 1974 to legally limit campaign contributions. It banned direct contributing to campaigns by corporations and trade unions and limited individual donations to $1,000 per campaign. It introduced public funding for presidential primaries and elections. The Act also placed limits of $5,000 per campaign on PACs (political action committees). The limits on individual contributions and prohibition of direct corporate or labor union campaigns led to a huge increase in the number of PACs. Today many labor unions and corporations have their own PACs, and over 4,000 in total exist. The 1974 amendment also specified a Federal Election Commission, created in 1975 to administer and enforce campaign finance law. Various other provisions were also included, such as a ban on contributions or expenditures by foreign nationals (incorporated from the Foreign Agents Registration Act (FARA) (1966)).

The case of Buckley v. Valeo (1976) challenged the Act. Most provisions were upheld, but the court found that the mandatory spending limit imposed was unconstitutional, as was the limit placed on campaign spending from the candidate's personal fortune and the provision that limited independent expenditures by individuals and organizations supporting but not officially linked to a campaign. The effect of the first decision was to allow candidates such as Ross Perot and Steve Forbes to spend enormous amounts of their own money in their own campaigns. The effect of the second decision was to allow the culture of "soft money" to develop.

A 1979 amendment to the Federal Election Campaign Act allowed political parties to spend without limit on get-out-the-vote and voter registration activities conducted primarily for a presidential candidate. Later, they were permitted by FECA to use "soft money", unregulated, unlimited contributions to fund this effort. Increasingly, the money began to be spent on issue advertising, candidate specific advertising that was being funded mostly by soft money.

The Bipartisan Campaign Reform Act of 2002 banned local and national parties from spending "soft money" and banned national party committees from accepting or spending soft money. It increased the limit of contributions by individuals from $1,000 to $2,000. It banned corporations or labor unions from funding issue advertising directly, and banned the use of corporate or labor money for advertisements that mention a federal candidate within 60 days of a general election or 30 days of a primary. The constitutionality of the bill was challenged and in December 2003, the Supreme Court upheld most provisions of the legislation. (See McConnell v. FEC.)

A large number of "527 groups" were active for the first time in the 2004 election. These groups receive donations from individuals and groups and then spend the money on issue advocacy, such as the anti-Kerry ads by Swift Boat Veterans for Truth. This is a new form of soft money, and not surprisingly it is controversial. Many 527 groups have close links with the Democratic or Republican parties, even though legally they cannot coordinate their activities with them. John McCain, one of the senators behind the Bipartisan Campaign Reform Act, and President Bush have both declared a desire to ban 527s.

Changing campaign finance laws is a highly controversial issue. Some reformers wish to see laws changed in order to improve electoral competition and political equality. Opponents wish to see the system stay as it is, whereas other reformers wish even fewer restrictions on the freedom to spend and contribute money. The Supreme Court has made it increasingly difficult for those who wish to regulate election financing, but options like partial public funding of campaigns are still possible and offer the potential to address reformers' concerns with minimal restrictions on the freedom to contribute.

=== Primaries and caucuses ===
In partisan elections, candidates are chosen by primary elections (abbreviated to "primaries") and caucuses in the states, the District of Columbia, Puerto Rico, American Samoa, Guam, and the U.S. Virgin Islands.

A primary election is an election in which registered voters in a jurisdiction (nominating primary) select a political party's candidate for a later election. There are various types of primary: either the whole electorate is eligible, and voters choose one party's primary at the polling booth (an open primary); or only independent voters can choose a party's primary at the polling booth (a semi-closed primary); or only registered members of the party are allowed to vote (closed primary). The blanket primary, when voters could vote for all parties' primaries on the same ballot was struck down by the United States Supreme Court as violating the First Amendment guarantee of freedom of assembly in the case California Democratic Party v. Jones. Primaries are also used to select candidates at the state level, for example in gubernatorial elections.

Caucuses also nominate candidates by election, but they are very different from primaries. Caucuses are meetings that occur at precincts and involve discussion of each party's platform and issues such as voter turnout in addition to voting. Eleven states: Iowa, New Mexico, North Dakota, Maine, Nevada, Hawaii, Minnesota, Kansas, Alaska, Wyoming, Colorado and the District of Columbia use caucuses, for one or more political parties.

The primary and caucus season in presidential elections lasts from the Iowa caucus in January to the last primaries in June. Front-loading – when larger numbers of contests take place in the opening weeks of the season—can have an effect on the nomination process, potentially reducing the number of realistic candidates, as fund-raisers and donors quickly abandon those they see as untenable. However, it is not the case that the successful candidate is always the candidate that does the best in the early primaries. There is also a period dubbed the "invisible primary" that takes place before the primary season, when candidates attempt to solicit media coverage and funding well before the real primary season begins.

A state's presidential primary election or caucus usually is an indirect election: instead of voters directly selecting a particular person running for president, it determines how many delegates each party's national political convention will receive from their respective state. These delegates then in turn select their party's presidential nominee. Held in the summer, a political convention's purpose is also to adopt a statement of the party's principles and goals known as the platform and adopt the rules for the party's activities.

The day on which primaries are held for congressional seats, and state and local offices may also vary between states. The only federally mandated day for elections is Election Day for the general elections of the president and Congress; all other elections are at the discretion of the individual state and local governments.

== Election information on the web ==
In most states of the U.S., the chief election officer is the secretary of state. In some states, local officials like a county registrar of voters or supervisor of elections manages the conduct of elections under the supervision of (or in coordination with) the chief election officer of the state. Many of these state and county offices have web sites that provide information to help voters obtain information on their polling places for each election, the various districts to which they belong (e.g., House and Senate districts in the state and federal legislature, school boards, water districts, municipalities, etc.), as well as dates of elections and deadlines to file to run or register to vote. Some allow voters to download a sample ballot in advance of the election.

More systematic coverage is provided by websites devoted specifically to collecting election information and making it available to the public. Two of the better known such sites are Ballotpedia and Vote Smart. These are run by non-profit, non-partisan organizations. They have paid staffs and are much more tightly controlled than Wikipedia.

The website 270towin provides actual electoral college maps (both current and historic) but also the ability to use an interactive map in order to make election predictions. Ongoing election news is reported as well as data on Senate and House races.

OpenSecrets provides election information focusing on campaign finance.

== Criticism, concerns, and challenges ==
=== Voter suppression and subversion ===
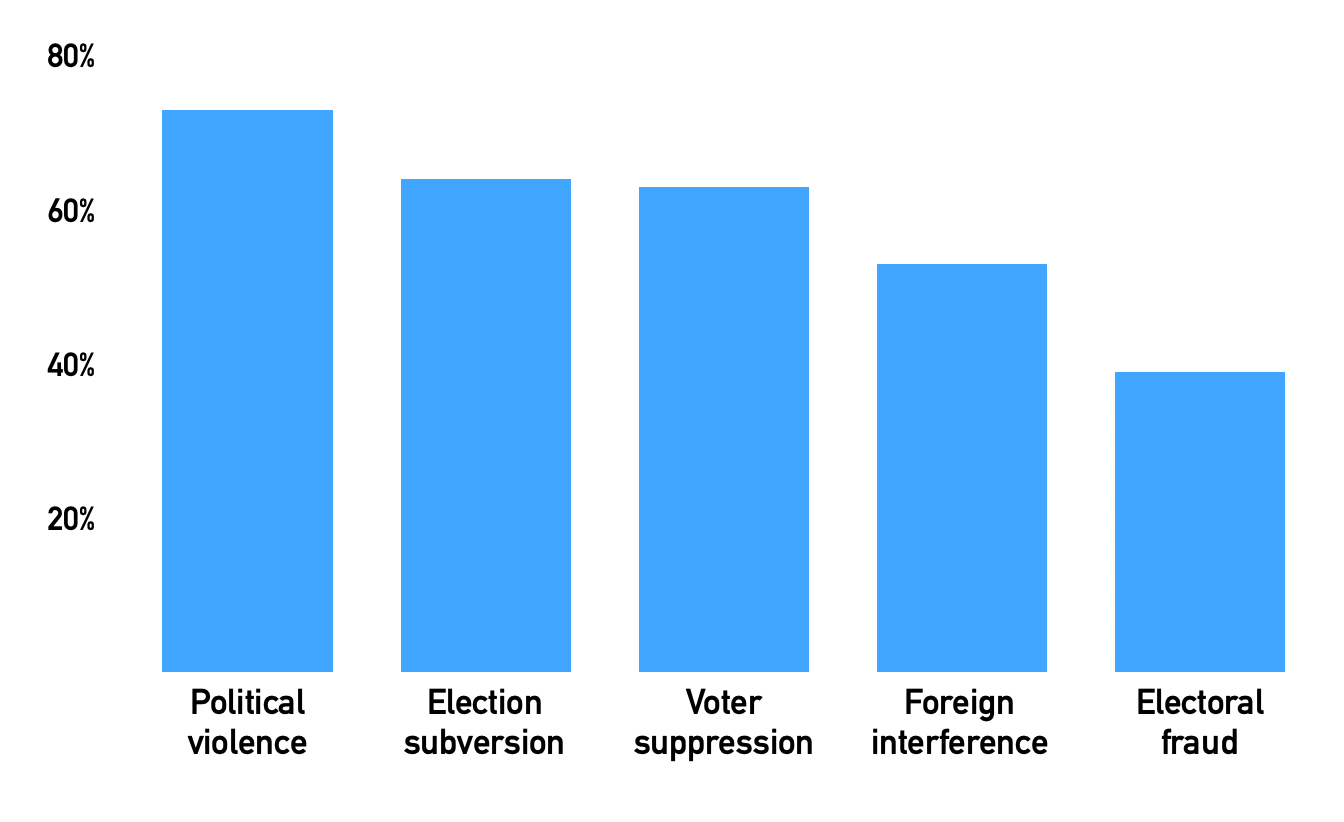
Major election threats according to 2022 survey of Californians

Voting laws and procedures between the states vary as a consequence of the decentralized system, including those pertaining to provisional ballots, postal voting, voter IDs, voter registration, voting machines and vote counting, felony disenfranchisement, and election recounts. Thus the voting rights or voter suppression in one state may be stricter or more lenient than another state. Following the 2020 US presidential election, decentralized administration and inconsistent state voting laws and processes have shown themselves to be targets for voter subversion schemes enabled by appointing politically motivated actors to election administration roles with degrees of freedom to subvert the will of the people. One such scheme would allow these officials to appoint a slate of "alternate electors" to skew operations of the electoral college in favor of a minority party.

=== Vote counting time ===
As detailed in a state-by-state breakdown, the United States has a long-standing tradition of publicly announcing the incomplete, unofficial vote counts on election night (the late evening of election day), and declaring unofficial "projected winners", despite that many of the mail-in and absentee votes have not been counted yet. In some states, in fact, none of them have yet been counted by that time. This tradition was based on the assumption that the incomplete, unofficial count on election night is probably going to match the official count, which is officially finished and certified several weeks later. An intrinsic weakness of this assumption, and of the tradition of premature announcements based on it, is that the public is likely to misapprehend that these particular "projected winning" candidates have certainly won before any official vote count has been completed, whereas in fact all that is truly known is that those candidates have some degree of likelihood of having won; the magnitude of the likelihood (all the way from very reliable to not reliable at all) varies by state because the details of election procedures vary by state. This problem affects all non–in-person votes, even those cast weeks before election day—not just late-arriving ones.

=== Election timing ===
Media coverage, public interest and voter turnout are typically the highest during presidential election years, decrease during the midterm elections, and are historically the lowest during the odd-numbered "off-year" elections. The presidential election is a single, high-profile event that generates the highest media coverage and interest, and the coinciding state and local races benefit from the resulting coattail effect. But while the national news media may cover the overall party control and the relatively few high-profile races, most of the individual state and local elections must rely on the local news coverage, which has declined in the 21st Century due to financial cutbacks and the loss of readership/viewership. Decreased news coverage during the midterm and off-year elections results in less people becoming less-informed and less-interested in turning out to vote in these state and local elections. The different age, partisan, and racial representation of those turning out to vote then affects these races.

Thus, some of these local governments hold off-year elections due to the political calculations of incumbent politicians. The lower turnout also benefits well-organized special interest groups that often make up local political machines, making it easier for their favored candidates to capture more of a government. Even though large majorities from both major political parties want to shift to on-cycle elections, these interest groups have used their political power to slow down some but not all of the reform efforts, with California, Arizona and Nevada seeing significant success in shifting local elections on-cycle.

=== Election security ===
Attempts by foreign countries to influence the outcome have occurred in some elections.

Allegations of voter impersonation, of which there are only 31 documented cases in the United States from the 2000–2014 period, have led to calls for Voter ID laws in the United States. Notable instances of allegations of stolen elections and election fraud include the 1948 United States Senate election in Texas, in which 202 "patently fraudulent" ballots gave future President Lyndon Johnson a seat in the US Senate and the 2018 North Carolina 9th congressional district election in which ballot tampering was admitted in witness testimony, including filling in blank votes to favor Republican candidates. A poll from April 2023 found that one in five American adults still believed the 2020 election was stolen from Trump, representing little change from 2021.

=== Structural critiques ===
In 2014, scientists from Princeton University did a study on the influence of the so-called "elite", and their derived power from special interest lobbying, versus the "ordinary" US citizen within the US political system. They found that the US looked more like an oligarchy than a representative democracy—in particular, their study found that average citizens had an almost nonexistent influence on public policies and that the ordinary citizen had little or no independent influence on policy at all.

Sanford Levinson argues that next to the fact that campaign financing and gerrymandering are seen as serious problems for democracy, also one of the root causes of the American democratic deficit lies in the United States Constitution itself, for example there is a lack of proportional representation in the Senate for highly populated states such as California as all states regardless of population are given two seats in the Senate.

Partisan election officials in the United States can give an appearance of unfairness, even when there are very few issues, especially when an election official like a secretary of state is running for an election they are overseeing. Richard Hasen argued that the United States is the only advanced democracy that lets partisan officials oversee elections, and that switching to a nonpartisan model would improve trust, participation and effectiveness of elections.

The Electoral College has been criticized by some people for being un-democratic (it can choose a candidate who did not win the popular vote) and for encouraging campaigns to only focus on swing states, as well for giving more power to smaller states with less electoral votes as they have a smaller population per electoral vote compared to more populated states. This can be seen through one electoral college vote representing 622,000 voters in California, compared to one electoral college vote representing 195,000 voters in Wyoming.

The first-past-the-post system has also been criticized for creating a de facto pure two-party system (as postulated in Duverger's law) that suppresses voices that do not hold views consistent with the largest faction in a particular party, as well as limiting voters' choices in elections.

=== Modernizing elections ===
The National States Geographic Information Council (NSGIC), is a non-profit that serves as a national forum for advacing the understanding, use, and integration of geographic information systems (GIS) and spatial technologies by U.S. states. The purpose of NSGIC's Geo-Enabled Elections Project is to promote the use of GIS for geo-enabled elections to map election information such as voter locations, election district boundaries, and other election administrative duties to modernize the election process and reduce election errors and improve accuracy. This modern approach is based on the growing using of GIS and other geospatial technologies at state and local levels for governance. Using a geo-enabled election method has been found to reduce cost, create more efficient work time, and increase voter transperency and trust in the election process.

The Election Assistance Commission (EAC) provides a Clearinghouse Resource on Election Technology that includes information on geo-enabled elections, the use of Google Maps, and other spatial technologies.

An global industry for mapping tools and software to make it easier to standardize the election process has grown with the availability of affordable GIS software. For example, ESRI, one of the largest geospatial GIS software companies, has Election Management mapping software for election planning, election operations, and stakeholder engagement.

== See also ==
- Democracy in the Americas
- Election Day in the United States – Day for general elections in the USA

== Sources ==
- Gierzynski, Anthony (2011). Saving American Elections: A Diagnosis and Prescription for a Healthier Democracy. Cambria Press. ISBN 978-1-60497-752-3.
