= Governor (United States) =

Heads of government of each U.S. state and territory

In the United States, a governor serves as the chief executive and commander-in-chief in each of the fifty states and in the five permanently inhabited territories, functioning as head of state and head of government therein. While like all officials in the United States, checks and balances are placed on the office of the governor, significant powers may include ceremonial head of state (representing the state), executive (overseeing the state's government), legislative (proposing, and signing or vetoing laws), judicial (granting state law pardons or commutations), and military (overseeing the militia and organized armed forces of the state). As such, governors are responsible for implementing state laws and overseeing the operation of the state executive branch. As state leaders, governors advance and pursue new and revised policies and programs using a variety of tools, among them executive orders, executive budgets, and legislative proposals and vetoes. Governors carry out their management and leadership responsibilities and objectives with the support and assistance of department and agency heads, many of whom they are empowered to appoint. A majority of governors have the authority to appoint state court judges as well, in most cases from a list of names submitted by a nominations committee.

The sole federal district, the District of Columbia, has also been led by a chief executive officer of varying titles, including governor. The current governor-equivalent of D.C. is its mayor.

All with the exception of five states and one territory (Arizona, (Note: Following the passage of 2022 Arizona Proposition 131, the state will have a lieutenant governor after January 4, 2027, following the 2026 Arizona gubernatorial election.) Maine, New Hampshire, Oregon, Puerto Rico, and Wyoming) have a lieutenant governor. The lieutenant governor succeeds to the gubernatorial office (the powers and duties but not the office, in Massachusetts and West Virginia), if vacated by impeachment, death, or resignation of the previous governor. Lieutenant governors also serve as unofficial acting state governors in case the incumbent governors are unable to fulfill their duties, and they often serve as presiding officers of the upper houses of state legislatures. In such cases, they cannot participate in political debates, and they have no vote whenever these houses are not equally divided.

== Role and powers ==
States are semi-sovereign republics sharing sovereignty with the federal government of the United States, and possess a number of powers and rights under the United States Constitution, such as regulating intrastate commerce, holding elections, creating local governments, and ratifying constitutional amendments. Each state has its own constitution, grounded in republican principles, and government, consisting of three branches: executive, legislative, and judicial. Also, due to the shared sovereignty between each state and the federal government, Americans are citizens of both the federal republic and of the state in which they reside. The United States Constitution, while not explicitly mentioning an office of governor, does designate the "executive authority" in any state in the roles of issuing "Writs of Election" to fill congressional vacancies (Article I, Section 2), issuing demands for extradition of individuals charged with crimes (Article IV, Section 2), and issuing writs of election to fill vacancies in the Senate (Amendment XVII).

The governor heads the government's executive branch in each state or territory and, depending on the individual jurisdiction, may have considerable control over government budgeting, the power of appointment of many officials (including many judges), and a considerable role in legislation. The governor may also have additional roles, such as that of commander-in-chief of the state's National Guard (when not federalized) and of that state's respective defense force (which is not subject to federalization). In many states and territories the governor also has partial or absolute power to commute or pardon a criminal sentence. All U.S. governors serve four-year terms except those in New Hampshire and Vermont, who serve two-year terms.

In all states, the governor is directly elected, and in most cases has considerable practical powers, though this may be moderated by the state legislature and in some cases by other elected executive officials. In the five extant U.S. territories, all governors are now directly elected as well, though in the past many territorial governors were historically appointed by the President of the United States. Governors can veto state bills, and in all but seven states they have the power of the line-item veto on appropriations bills (a power the President does not have). In some cases legislatures can override a gubernatorial veto by a two-thirds vote, in others by three-fifths.

In Alabama, Indiana, Kentucky, and Tennessee, the governor's veto can be overridden by a simple majority vote. In Arkansas, a gubernatorial veto may be overridden by an absolute majority. The governor of North Carolina had no veto power until a 1996 referendum. In 46 of the 50 states, whenever there is a vacancy of one of the state's U.S. Senate seats, that state's governor has the power to appoint someone to fill the vacancy until a special election is held; the governors of Kentucky, Rhode Island, North Dakota, and Wisconsin do not have this power.

A state governor may give an annual State of the State address in order to satisfy a constitutional stipulation that a governor must report annually (or in older constitutions described as being "from time to time") on the state or condition of the state. Governors of states may also perform ceremonial roles, such as greeting dignitaries, conferring state decorations, issuing symbolic proclamations or attending the state fair. The governor may also have an official residence (see Governor's Mansion).

In a ranking of the power of the governorship in all 50 states, University of North Carolina political scientist Thad Beyle makes the distinction between "personal powers" of governors, which are factors that vary from person to person, season to season – and the "institutional powers" that are set in place by law. Examples of measurable personal factors are how large a governor's margin of victory was on election day, and standing in public opinion polls. Whether a governor has strong budget controls, appointment authority, and veto powers are examples of institutional powers.

== History ==
In colonial North America, governors were chosen in a variety of ways, depending on how the colony was organized. In the crown colonies of Great Britain, France, and Spain, the governor was chosen by the ruling monarch of the colonizing power, or his designees; in British colonies, the Board of Trade was often the primary decision maker. Colonies based on a corporate charter, such as the Connecticut Colony and the Massachusetts Bay Colony, elected their own governors based on rules spelled out in the charter or other colonial legislation. In proprietary colonies, such as the Province of Carolina before it became a crown colony (and was divided into North and South), governors were chosen by the Lords Proprietor who controlled the colony. In the early years of the American Revolutionary War, eleven of the Thirteen Colonies evicted (with varying levels of violence) royal and proprietary governors. The other two colonies (Connecticut and Rhode Island) had corporate charters; Connecticut Governor Jonathan Trumbull was governor before and during the war period, while in Rhode Island, Governor Joseph Wanton was removed from office in 1775 for failing to support the rebel war effort.

Before achieving statehood, many of the 37 states, after the initial 13, were Territories of the United States or parts of territories. Administered by the federal government, they had governors who were appointed by the president and confirmed by the Senate rather than elected by the resident population. Election of territorial governors began in Puerto Rico in 1948. The last appointed territorial governor, Hyrum Rex Lee in American Samoa, left office in 1978.

== Demographics ==
=== Party ===
Party affiliation of current United States state and territorial governors as of January 2026: Democratic (24 states, 2 territories, and 1 district) Republican (26 states) Independent (1 territory) New Progressive (Republican affiliated) (1 territory) Non-partisan (Republican affiliated) (1 territory)

As of January 2026, there are 26 states with a Republican governor and 24 states with a Democratic governor. Four Democrats (including the Mayor of the District of Columbia), one Independent, and one New Progressive also occupy territorial governorships or mayorships. No independent and other third parties currently hold a state governorship.

=== Tenure ===
Governors' terms by state: No limit No limit, two-year terms One; re-eligible after 4 years / Two; re-eligible after 4 years Two; re-eligible after 8 years Two, life

For each term, governors serve four years in office. The exceptions are Vermont and New Hampshire where tenures are two years long.

The longest-serving current governor is Greg Abbott of Texas, who lost re-election to a fourth term in 2026. Upon his departure from office, the longest-serving governor will be Phil Scott of Vermont, who won a sixth two-year term in 2026.

The longest-serving governor of all time was Terry Branstad of Iowa, who was elected to his sixth (non-consecutive) term in 2014. Governor Branstad resigned on May 24, 2017, to become the United States Ambassador to China. He held the title of Governor of Iowa for 22 years. On December 14, 2015, he became the longest-serving governor in US history, breaking the record held by George Clinton of New York, who served 21 years from 1777 to 1795 and from 1801 to 1804.

In the majority of states and territories, term limit laws officially cap a governor's tenure.

=== Age ===
The oldest current state governor is Kay Ivey of Alabama, who was born on October 15, 1944 (age 82). The youngest current state governor is Sarah Huckabee Sanders of Arkansas, who was born on August 13, 1982 (age 44). Among territorial governors, Lou Leon Guerrero of Guam, born on November 8, 1950 (age 76), is the oldest, and Jenniffer González-Colón of Puerto Rico, born on August 5, 1976 (age 50), is the youngest.

The youngest person to ever serve as a governor in the United States was Stevens T. Mason of the Michigan Territory, first elected in 1835 having just turned 24. Mason would later become the first governor of the state of Michigan when it was admitted to the Union in January 1837, when he was 25. Mason was re-elected in November 1837, then age 26.

The second youngest governor ever elected was Henry C. Warmoth of Louisiana, who was elected during reconstruction in 1868 at the age of 26. The third youngest governor was William Sprague IV of Rhode Island, who was elected in 1860 at the age of 29. When future President Bill Clinton was elected Governor of Arkansas in 1978 at age 32, he became the youngest governor since Harold Stassen of Minnesota, elected in 1938 at age 31.

In 35 states, the minimum age requirement of the governor is age 30 years old or older, though in some it is age 25 years old or older (7), age 21 years old or older (1), or age 18 years old or older (5). Oklahoma is the only state with an older minimum age requirement, age 31 years old or older. Some states require the governor to be a qualified elector/voter, implying a minimum age of 18. Vermont requires candidates to be residents of the state for at least four years as of Election Day, which would preclude small children from running, but has no other implicit or explicit age limit.

=== Gender ===
State and territorial governors, colored as male (blue) and female (pink)

As of January 2026, 36 men and 14 women serve as state governors. The 14 female governors are: Kay Ivey of Alabama, Katie Hobbs of Arizona, Sarah Huckabee Sanders of Arkansas, Kim Reynolds of Iowa, Laura Kelly of Kansas, Janet Mills of Maine, Maura Healey of Massachusetts, Gretchen Whitmer of Michigan, Kelly Ayotte of New Hampshire, Mikie Sherrill of New Jersey, Michelle Lujan Grisham of New Mexico, Kathy Hochul of New York, Tina Kotek of Oregon, and Abigail Spanberger of Virginia. Of those, Ayotte, Huckabee Sanders, Ivey, and Reynolds are Republicans, while Healey, Hobbs, Hochul, Kelly, Kotek, Lujan Grisham, Mills, Sherrill, Spanberger, and Whitmer are Democrats. This record of 14 was briefly matched for less than two weeks in January 2025 following the inauguration of Kelly Ayotte of New Hampshire on January 9 but prior to the departure of Bethany Hall-Long of Delaware on January 21.

4 territorial governors are male; one territorial governor and the mayor of Washington, D.C. are female.

44 women have served or are currently serving as state or territorial governors, including two in an acting capacity.

The first female governor was Nellie Tayloe Ross of Wyoming (widow of the late Wyoming Governor William B. Ross) who was elected on November 4, 1924, and sworn in on January 5, 1925, succeeding Frank Lucas. Also elected on November 4, 1924, was Miriam A. Ferguson of Texas (wife of former Texas Governor James E. Ferguson), succeeding Pat Morris Neff on January 21, 1925. The first female governor elected without being the wife or widow of a past state governor was Ella T. Grasso of Connecticut, elected in 1974 and sworn in on January 8, 1975.

Connecticut, Arizona, New Hampshire, New Jersey, and New Mexico are the only five states to have elected female governors from both major parties. Arizona was the first state where a woman followed another woman as governor (they were from different parties). Arizona also has had the most female governors with a total of five, and is the first state to have three women in a row serve as governor. Washington was the first state to have both a female governor and female U.S. Senators serving at the same time (Christine Gregoire; Patty Murray; Maria Cantwell, respectively), from 2005 to 2013. New Hampshire was the first and currently only state to have a female governor and entirely female Congressional delegation serving at the same time, from 2013 to 2015.

=== LGBTQ status ===
There are currently three governors from the LGBTQ community: Jared Polis (Colorado), who is gay, along with Tina Kotek (Oregon) and Maura Healey (Massachusetts), who are both lesbian.

=== Race and ethnicity ===
Ethnic minorities as defined by the United States Census currently constitute 38.9% of the total population of the U.S. as of 2018. There are currently 47 state governors who are non-Hispanic whites of European American background. There are 3 minority governors: Wes Moore of Maryland, who is black, Michelle Lujan Grisham of New Mexico, who is of Hispanic descent; and Kevin Stitt of Oklahoma, who is a member of the Cherokee Nation. Stitt is a Republican, while Grisham and Moore are Democrats.

Among the five U.S. territories, one Hispanic (Jenniffer González-Colón of Puerto Rico), one Black (Albert Bryan of the U.S. Virgin Islands), and three Pacific Islander Americans (Lou Leon Guerrero of Guam, Pula Nikolao Pula of American Samoa, and Arnold Palacios of the Northern Mariana Islands) currently serve as governor. African-American Muriel Bowser is the current Mayor of the District of Columbia, an office equivalent to a governor.

In 1990, Douglas Wilder of Virginia became the first African-American governor of any state since the Reconstruction era.

=== Birthplace ===
Seventeen of the current state governors were born outside of the state they are serving as governor. Mike Dunleavy of Alaska (born in Pennsylvania), Ned Lamont of Connecticut (born in Washington, D.C.), Josh Green of Hawaii (born in New York), J. B. Pritzker of Illinois (born in California), Laura Kelly of Kansas (born in New York), Maura Healey of Massachusetts (born in Maryland), Tim Walz of Minnesota (born in Nebraska), Greg Gianforte of Montana (born in California), Mikie Sherrill of New Jersey (born in Virginia), Abigail Spanberger of Virginia (Born in New Jersey), Kevin Stitt of Oklahoma (born in Florida), Tina Kotek of Oregon (born in Pennsylvania), Josh Shapiro of Pennsylvania (born in Missouri), Mark Gordon of Wyoming (born in New York), and Patrick Morrisey of West Virginia (born in New York City). One governor, Joe Lombardo of Nevada, was born outside the United States (born in Sapporo, Japan).

State constitutions have varying requirements for the length of citizenship and residency of the governor but unlike the President, state governors do not need to be natural-born citizens. There is some ambiguity in some state constitutions if a governor must be a citizen or just a resident.

=== Physical disability ===
Two legally blind governors have served: Bob C. Riley, who was acting governor of Arkansas for 11 days in January 1975, and David Paterson, who was governor of New York from 2008 until 2011.

The current governor of Texas, Greg Abbott, has been paraplegic since an accident in 1984; he has used a wheelchair ever since. Governor of New York Franklin D. Roosevelt was paraplegic; he later became the first wheelchair-using president. Governor of Alabama George Wallace was paralyzed from the waist down after being shot in 1972. He never walked again.

== Salary ==
The average salary of a state governor in 2009 was $124,398. The highest salary currently being accepted is that of New York Governor Kathy Hochul at $225,000. The lowest salaries are those of Maine Governor Janet Mills and Jenniffer González-Colón of Puerto Rico at $70,000 each.

There have been several instances where the governor of a state has either refused their salary in its entirety or instead only taken $1.00 per year. Alabama Governor Robert J. Bentley refused his yearly salary of $119,950.00 until the state reached full employment. Michigan Governor Rick Snyder took a $1.00 yearly salary. Texas Governor Greg Abbott has returned his salary to the state during each year he has held office. During his tenure as Governor of California, Arnold Schwarzenegger also did not accept his salary of $170,000 per year. However, several governors instead have decided to take a reduction in their salary instead of refusing it entirely. New York Governor Andrew Cuomo took a 5% reduction in his salary in 2015, and Kentucky Governor Steve Beshear reduced his salary by 10% during the same year.

Only nine states (Massachusetts, California, Illinois, New York, New Jersey, Michigan, Pennsylvania, North Carolina, and Virginia) currently offer their governors a higher salary than the $174,000 paid to members of Congress. In many states, the governor is not the highest-paid state employee; most often, that distinction is held by the head football or men's basketball coach at a major state university.

=== State governor salaries by state ===
This table listed below displays the gubernatorial salary by state as of the most recent year data is available. This includes the money that is allocated towards their salary whether or not a state governor decides to take that salary or not. The Governor of Maine was the lowest paid governor being paid $70,000 in 2023 while the highest paid state Governor was the Governor of New York who was paid $250,000 in 2023.

Gubernatorial salaries as of 2023
State	Salary
Alabama	$131,800
Alaska	$145,000
Arizona	$95,000
Arkansas	$158,739
California	$224,020
Colorado	$90,000
Connecticut	$226,711
Delaware	$171,000
Florida	$141,400
Georgia	$180,000
Hawaii	$184,860
Idaho	$151,400
Illinois	$205,700
Indiana	$134,051
Iowa	$130,000
Kansas	$110,707
Kentucky	$164,355
Louisiana	$125,185
Maine	$70,000
Maryland	$184,000
Massachusetts	$222,185
Michigan	$159,300
Minnesota	$127,629
Mississippi	$122,160
Missouri	$140,596
Montana	$118,397
Nebraska	$105,000
Nevada	$170,062
New Hampshire	$146,172
New Jersey	$175,000
New Mexico	$110,000
New York	$250,000
North Carolina	$165,750
North Dakota	$143,646
Ohio	$171,059
Oklahoma	$147,000
Oregon	$98,600
Pennsylvania	$229,642
Rhode Island	$163,295
South Carolina	$106,078
South Dakota	$139,100
Tennessee	$204,336
Texas	$153,750
Utah	$182,900
Vermont	$201,136
Virginia	$175,000
Washington	$198,257
West Virginia	$150,000
Wisconsin	$165,568
Wyoming	$140,000

== Gubernatorial election timeline ==
=== Staggered election years ===
The fixed terms of governors are staggered, and may be held up for election in any presidential, midterm, or off-year election year. Two states, New Hampshire and Vermont, elect their governors to two-year terms. The other 48 states, all five territories, and the District of Columbia elect theirs to four-year terms.

Almost all gubernatorial elections are held on Election Day, the first Tuesday following the first Monday in November (i.e., the Tuesday that occurs within November 2 to November 8). Louisiana instead holds its gubernatorial primary on the third or fourth Saturday of October and the general election (commonly referred to as the runoff within the state) on the third Saturday of November, but the general election is canceled if one candidate wins the primary outright

==== Even-numbered election year cycle ====
Governors from 2 states are elected to two-year terms every even-numbered year. They were last elected in 2024 and their next election will be in 2026.

Recent years are 2014, 2016, 2018, 2020, 2022, 2024, and 2026.

States include: New Hampshire and Vermont.

==== Midterm election year cycle ====
Governors from 34 states and 3 territories, as well as the Mayor of the District of Columbia, are elected during every midterm election year. They were last elected in 2022 and their next election will be in 2026.

Recent years are 2006, 2010, 2014, 2018, 2022, and 2026.

States and territories include: Alabama, Alaska, Arizona, Arkansas, California, Colorado, Connecticut, Florida, Georgia, Hawaii, Idaho, Illinois, Iowa, Kansas, Maine, Maryland, Massachusetts, Michigan, Minnesota, Nebraska, Nevada, New Mexico, New York, Ohio, Oklahoma, Oregon, Pennsylvania, Rhode Island, South Carolina, South Dakota, Tennessee, Texas, Wisconsin, Wyoming, District of Columbia (mayor), Guam, Northern Mariana Islands, and the U.S. Virgin Islands.

==== Presidential election year cycle ====
Governors from 9 states and 2 territories are elected during every presidential election year. They were last elected in 2024 and their next election will be in 2028.

Recent years are 2008, 2012, 2016, 2020, and 2024.

States and territories include: Delaware, Indiana, Missouri, Montana, North Carolina, North Dakota, Utah, Washington, West Virginia, American Samoa, (Note: Although American Samoa and Puerto Rico hold elections during presidential election years, their status as territories instead of states make them ineligible to participate in those elections for president.) and Puerto Rico.

==== Off-year cycle before the presidential election year ====
Governors from 3 states are elected in the off-year before the presidential election year. They were last elected in 2023 and their next election will be in 2027.

Recent years are 2007, 2011, 2015, 2019, and 2023.

States include: Kentucky, Louisiana, and Mississippi.

==== Off-year cycle after the presidential election year ====
Governors from 2 states are elected in the off-year after the presidential election year. They were last elected in 2025 and their next election will be in 2029.

Recent years are 2005, 2009, 2013, 2017, 2021, and 2025.

States include: New Jersey and Virginia.

=== Gubernatorial primaries ===
All states except for California, Louisiana, and Washington hold partisan primaries in which each political party holds a primary election, and the winner of each primary election then moves on to compete the general election. California, Louisiana, and Washington instead hold nonpartisan primaries in which all candidates run against each other at once, regardless of political party, and the top two candidates then move on to the general election. However, the winner of the Louisiana primary automatically wins that state's office (and thus no general election is required there) if they get more than 50% of the votes cast. California prohibits write-in candidates from competing in the general election.

=== Comparison with other U.S. general elections ===
Basic rotation of U.S. general elections (fixed terms only^{[1]})
Year	2026	2027	2028	2029	2030
Type	Midterm	Off-year	Presidential	Off-year	Midterm
President	No		Yes	No	
Senate	Class II (33 seats)	No	Class III (34 seats)	No	Class I (33 seats)
House	All 435 seats^{[2]}	No	All 435 seats^{[3]}	No	All 435 seats^{[2]}
Gubernatorial	36 states, DC, & 3 territories^{[4]} AL, AK, AZ, AR, CA, CO, CT, FL, GA, HI, ID, IL, IA, KS, ME, MD, MA, MI, MN, NE, NV, NH, NM, NY, OH, OK, OR, PA, RI, SC, SD, TN, TX, VT, WI, WY, DC (Mayor), GU, MP, VI	3 states KY, LA, MS	11 states, 2 territories DE, IN, MO, MT, NH, NC, ND, UT, VT, WA, WV, AS, PR	2 states NJ, VA	36 states, DC, & 3 territories^{[4]} AL, AK, AZ, AR, CA, CO, CT, FL, GA, HI, ID, IL, IA, KS, ME, MD, MA, MI, MN, NE, NV, NH, NM, NY, OH, OK, OR, PA, RI, SC, SD, TN, TX, VT, WI, WY, DC (Mayor), GU, MP, VI
Lieutenant gubernatorial^{[5]}	10 states^{[6]} AL, AR, CA, GA, ID, NV, OK, RI, TX, VT	2 states LA, MS	5 states, 1 territory DE, MO, NC, VT, WA, AS	1 state VA	10 states^{[6]} AL, AR, CA, GA, ID, NV, OK, RI, TX, VT
Secretary of state	25 states AL, AZ, AR, CA, CO, CT, GA, ID, IL, IN, IA, KS, MA, MI, MN, NE, NV, NM, ND, OH, RI, SC, VT, WI, WY	3 states KY, LA, MS	7 states MO, MT, NC, OR, VT, WA, WV	None	25 states AL, AZ, AR, CA, CO, CT, GA, ID, IL, IN, IA, KS, MA, MI, MN, NE, NV, NM, ND, OH, RI, SC, VT, WI, WY
Attorney general	30 states, DC, & 2 territories AL, AZ, AR, CA, CO, CT, DE, FL, GA, ID, IL, IA, KS, MD, MA, MI, MN, NE, NV, NM, NY, ND, OH, OK, RI, SC, SD, TX, VT, WI, DC, GU, MP	3 states KY, LA, MS	10 states IN, MO, MT, NC, OR, PA, UT, VT, WA, WV	1 state VA	30 states, DC, & 2 territories AL, AZ, AR, CA, CO, CT, DE, FL, GA, ID, IL, IA, KS, MD, MA, MI, MN, NE, NV, NM, NY, ND, OH, OK, RI, SC, SD, TX, VT, WI, WY, DC, GU, MP
State treasurer^{[7]}	23 states AL, AZ, AR, CA, CO, CT, FL (CFO), ID, IL, IN, IA, KS, MA, NE, NV, NM, OH, OK, RI, SC, VT, WI, WY	3 states KY, LA, MS	9 states MO, NC, ND, OR, PA, UT, VT, WA, WV	None	23 states AL, AZ, AR, CA, CO, CT, FL (CFO), ID, IL, IN, IA, KS, MA, NE, NV, NM, OH, OK, RI, SC, VT, WI, WY
State comptroller/controller	8 states CA, CT, IL, MD, NV, NY, SC, TX	None	None	None	8 states CA, CT, IL, MD, NV, NY, SC, TX
State auditor	15 states AL, AR, DE, IN, IA, MA, MN, MO, NE, NM, OH, OK, SD, VT, WY	2 states KY, MS	9 states MT, NC, ND, PA, UT, VT, WA, WV, GU	None	15 states AL, AR, DE, IN, IA, MA, MN, MO, NE, NM, OH, OK, SD, VT, WY
Superintendent of public instruction	7 states AZ, CA, GA, ID, OK, SC, WY	None	4 states MT, NC, ND, WA	1 state WI	7 states AZ, CA, GA, ID, OK, SC, WY
Agriculture commissioner	6 states AL, FL, GA, IA, ND, SC, TX	3 states KY, LA, MS	2 states NC, WV	None	6 states AL, FL, GA, IA, ND, SC, TX
Insurance commissioner	5 states CA, DE, GA, KS, OK	2 states LA, MS	3 states NC, ND, WA	None	5 states CA, DE, GA, KS, OK
Other commissioners & elected officials	9 states AZ (Mine Inspector), AR (Land), GA (Labor), NM (Land), ND (Tax), OK (Labor), OR (Labor), SD (Land), TX (Land)	None	1 state NC (Labor)	None	9 states AZ (Mine Inspector), AR (Land), GA (Labor), NM (Land), ND (Tax), OK (Labor), OR (Labor), SD (Land), TX (Land)
State legislatures^{[8]}	46 states, DC, & 4 territories AK, AL, AZ, AR, CA, CO, CT, DE, FL, GA, HI, ID, IL, IN, IA, KS, KY, ME, MA, MD, MI, MN, MO, NE, NV, NH, NM, NY, NC, ND, OH, OK, OR, PA, RI, SC, SD, TN, TX, UT, VT, WA, WV, WI, WY, DC, AS, GU, MP, VI	4 states LA, MS, NJ, VA	44 states, DC, & 5 territories AK, AZ, AR, CA, CO, CT, DE, FL, GA, HI, ID, IL, IN, IA, KS, KY, ME, MA, MI, MN, MO, NE, NV, NH, NM, NY, NC, ND, OH, OK, OR, PA, RI, SC, SD, TN, TX, UT, VT, WA, WV, WI, WY, DC, AS, GU, MP, PR, VI	2 states VA. NJ	46 states, DC, & 4 territories AK, AL, AZ, AR, CA, CO, CT, DE, FL, GA, HI, ID, IL, IN, IA, KS, KY, ME, MA, MD, MI, MN, MO, NE, NV, NH, NM, NY, NC, ND, OH, OK, OR, PA, RI, SC, SD, TN, TX, UT, VT, WA, WV, WI, WY, DC, AS, GU, MP, VI
State boards of education^{[9]}	8 states, DC, & 3 territories AL, CO, KS, MI, NE, OH, TX, UT, DC, GU, MP, VI	None	8 states, DC, & 3 territories AL, CO, KS, MI, NE, OH, TX, UT, DC, GU, MP, VI	None	8 states, DC, & 3 territories AL, CO, KS, MI, NE, OH, TX, UT, DC, GU, MP, VI
Other state, local, and tribal offices	Varies				

^{1} This table does not include special elections, which may be held to fill political offices that have become vacant between the regularly scheduled elections.
^{2} As well as all six non-voting delegates of the U.S. House.
^{3} As well as five non-voting delegates of the U.S. House. The resident commissioner of Puerto Rico instead serves a four-year term that coincides with the presidential term.
^{4} The governors of New Hampshire and Vermont are each elected to two-year terms. The other 48 state governors and all five territorial governors serve four-year terms.
^{5} In 26 states and 3 territories the lieutenant governor is elected on the same ticket as the governor: AK, CO, CT, FL, HI, IL, IN, IA, KS, KY, MD, MA, MI, MN, MT, NE, NJ, NM, NY, ND, OH, PA, SC, SD, UT, WI, GU, MP, VI.
^{6} Like the governor, Vermont's other officials are each elected to two-year terms. All other state officers for all other states listed serve four-year terms.
^{7} In some states, the comptroller or controller has the duties equivalent to a treasurer. There are some states with both positions, so both have been included separately.
^{8} This list does not differentiate chambers of each legislature. Forty-nine state legislatures are bicameral; Nebraska is unicameral. Additionally, Washington, DC, Guam, and the US Virgin Islands are unicameral; the other territories are bicameral. All legislatures have varying terms for their members. Many have two-year terms for the lower house and four-year terms for the upper house. Some have all two-year terms and some all four-year terms. Arkansas has a combination of both two- and four-year terms in the same chamber.
^{9} Most states not listed here have a board appointed by the governor and legislature. All boards listed here have members that serve four-year staggered terms, except Colorado, which has six-year terms, and Guam, which has two-year terms. Most are elected statewide, some are elected from districts. Louisiana, Ohio, Guam, and the Northern Mariana Islands have additional members who are appointed.

== Term limits ==
In most states, governors can serve two four-year terms.

== Relationship with lieutenant governor ==
Position nonexistent Title given to the leader of state senate Separate election Same ticket in the general election, separate election in the primaries Same ticket

The type of relationship between the governor and the lieutenant governor greatly varies by state. In some states the governor and lieutenant governor are completely independent of each other, while in others the governor gets to choose (prior to the election) who would be their lieutenant governor.

- Five states do not have a lieutenant governor. In those states, a different constitutional officer assumes the office of the governor should there be a vacancy in the office. Those states are Arizona, Oregon and Wyoming, where the Secretary of State is next in line, and Maine and New Hampshire, where the President of the Senate is next in line. This may exactly lead to the constitutional officers sometimes originating from the different political parties.
- Two states have the State Senate appoint the lieutenant governor, which means that the governor and the lieutenant governor may be from different parties. Those states are Tennessee and West Virginia.
- 17 states have the separate elections for the governor and the lieutenant governor, which means the governor and the lieutenant governor may be from different political parties. Those states are Alabama, Arkansas, California, Delaware, Georgia, Idaho, Louisiana, Mississippi, Missouri, Nevada, North Carolina, Oklahoma, Rhode Island, Texas, Vermont, Virginia, and Washington.
- Seven states have the governor and the lieutenant governor run together on the same ticket, but the governor does not get to choose their own running mate. In those states, the primaries for governor and lieutenant governor are held separately, and the winners run together as a joint ticket in the general election. The governor and lieutenant governor would therefore be from the same party, but not necessarily political allies. Those states are Connecticut, Hawaii, Massachusetts, New Mexico, New York, Pennsylvania, and Wisconsin.
- 20 states have the governor and the lieutenant governor run together on the same ticket, where the gubernatorial candidate gets to choose their running mate similar to the President and Vice President of the United States. In nine of those states, Alaska, Illinois, Kansas, Kentucky, Maryland, Minnesota, North Dakota, Ohio, and Utah, the gubernatorial candidates must pick their running mates before the primaries. In the other eleven states—Arizona, Colorado, Florida, Indiana, Iowa, Michigan, Montana, Nebraska, New Jersey, South Carolina, and South Dakota—the running mate may be chosen after the primary. The latter system allows the nominee to potentially select a defeated primary competitor.

== Constitutional gubernatorial qualifications by state ==
Citizenship requirements to become Governor of a US State. States with Numbers are of US states with Citizenship requirements by Years.

With the notable exception of Kansas, each of the states specifies in its constitution its qualifications for Governor.

State and statute	Minimum age	Residency	U.S. citizenship	Registered voter/elector	Sole employment	Sole office	Notes
Alabama: Article V, Section 116	30	7 years (at election)	10 years (at election)			Yes	Federal positions and any other state positions are precluded
Alaska: Article III, Section 2	30	7 years (at filing)	7 years (at filing)	Yes		Yes	"qualified voter of the State..." "The governor shall not hold any other office or position of profit under the United States, the State, or its political subdivisions."
Arizona: Article V, Section 2:	25	5 years (at election)	5 years (at election)	Yes			
Arkansas: Article 6, Section 11	30	7 years (at election)	Yes			Yes	"May not hold any federal office, any civil or military commission, any office in another state, or any other office in Arkansas."
California: Article 5, Section 2	18 (by virtue that the candidate must be a registered voter)	5 years (at election)	5 years (at election)	Yes		Yes	
Colorado: Article IV, Section 4	30	2 years (at election)	Yes			Any legislative or judicial office is precluded	The standard for residency is not affected by time out of the state due to civil or military service
Connecticut: Article IV, Section 5	30	Yes	Yes	Yes			
Delaware: Article III, Section 1	30	6 years (at election)	12 years (at election)				"...and have been a citizen and inhabitant of the United States twelve years next before the day of his election, and the last six years of that term an inhabitant of this State, unless he shall have been absent on public business of the United States or of this State."
Florida: Article IV, Section 5	30	7 years		7 years			
Georgia: Article V, Section 1, Paragraph IV	30	6 years (at election)	15 years (at election)	Yes			
Hawaii: Article V, Section 1	30		5 years (at election)			Yes	"The governor shall not hold any other office or employment of profit under the State or the United States during the governor's term of office."
Idaho: Article IV, Section 3	30	2 years (at election)	Yes				
Illinois: Article V, Section 3	25	3 years (at election)	Yes				
Indiana: Article 5, Section 1	30	5 years (at election)	5 years (at election)			Yes	The governor may not hold any other state or federal office during his term
Iowa: Article IV, Section 6	30	2 years (at election)	Yes				
Kansas: Constitution of Kansas	18						No requirements set forth in the Constitution, however a law was passed in 2018 requiring gubernatorial candidates to be residents of the state and at least 18 years of age.
Kentucky: Article IV, Section 72	30	6 years (at election)	Yes				
Louisiana: Article IV, Section 2	25	5 years	Yes	Yes		Yes	
Maine: Article IV, Part 1	30	5 years	15 years	Yes		Yes	During his/her tenure in office, a statewide elected official shall hold no other public office
Maryland: Article II, Section I	30	5 years (at election)	Yes	5 years (at election)			
Massachusetts:Section I, Article II	30	7 years (at election)					
Michigan:Section 22	30	Yes	Yes	4 years (at election)			
Minnesota: Article V, Section 2	25	1 year (at election)	Yes	Yes			
Mississippi: Article V	30	5 years	20 years				
Missouri: Article IV	30	10 years	15 years				
Montana: Article VI	25	2 years (at election)	Yes				
Nebraska: Article IV	30	5 years	Yes				
Nevada: Article V, Section I	25	2 years		Yes		Yes	While in office, the governor may not hold any federal level office.
New Hampshire: Constitution of New Hampshire	30	7 years (at election)	Yes	Yes			
New Jersey: Article V	30	7 years	20 years			Yes	No governor shall hold office in any other state or under the federal government, nor shall a sitting governor be elected to any legislative seat. Governors who accept any state or federal position or profit are considered to have vacated their seat.
New Mexico: Article V, Section 3	30	5 years (at election)	Yes				
(New York (state)) New York: Article IV	30	5 years (at election)	Yes				
North Carolina: Article III	30	2 years	5 years				
North Dakota: Constitution of North Dakota	30	5 years	Yes	Yes			
Ohio: Constitution of Ohio	18	Yes	Yes	Yes		Yes	A candidate for the governor's office may not hold any congressional or federal office or any other state office.
Oklahoma: Constitution of Oklahoma	31	10 years	10 years				
Oregon: Constitution of Oregon	30	3 years	Yes				The age requirements do not apply to someone who succeeds to office under Section 8a of Article V.
Pennsylvania: Constitution of Pennsylvania	30	7 years	Yes			Yes	The governor may not hold Congressional office, any other office under the Commonwealth, or any federal office. The exception is that the governor may be a reserve member of the National Guard.
Rhode Island: Article III, Of Qualification of Office		30 days	30 days	Yes		Yes	Governors shall not be serving a sentence for, on probation for, or on parole for any felony.
South Carolina: Article IV	30	5 years	Yes			Yes	The statute that a candidate for the governor must believe in the existence of the "Supreme Being" was declared unconstitutional by the South Carolina Supreme Court in 1996; although it has not been repealed, it is unenforceable. Furthermore, the Governor may not hold office or a commission under any other power, excepting that of a militia.
South Dakota: Article IV	21	2 years (at election)	Yes				
Tennessee: Article III	30	7 years (at election)	Yes				
Texas: Article 4, Section 4	30	5 years (at election)	Yes		Yes	Yes	The Governor... shall not hold any other office: civil, military or corporate; nor shall he practice any profession, and receive compensation, reward, fee, or the promise thereof for the same; nor receive any salary, reward or compensation or the promise thereof from any person or corporation, for any service rendered or performed during the time he is Governor, or to be thereafter rendered or performed.
Utah: Article VII	30	5 years (at election)	Yes	Yes		Yes	Sitting Governors may not hold any federal office, any state office other than the governorship, or be elected to the United States Senate during his term.
Vermont: Chapter II		4 years (at election)				Yes	Governors may not hold any legislative office or any other constitutional office. Excepting positions in military reserves, they also may not hold any office under the federal government. Nor is the governor eligible for any appointed position made by any branch of the Vermont government.
Virginia: Article VI, Section 1	30	5 years (at election)	Yes	1 year (at election)			
(Washington (state)) Washington: Article III, Section 2	18	Yes	Yes	Yes			
West Virginia: Article VII	30	5 years (at election)	Yes	Yes		Yes	Under Article IV, Section 10, no individual who has fought a duel with deadly weapons, sent a challenge for such a duel, or knowingly acted as a second in such a duel in West Virginia or in any other state may hold any office in West Virginia.
Wisconsin: Constitution of Wisconsin	18	Yes	Yes	Yes		Partially	No gubernatorial may hold any office, honor or profit under any foreign power, nor hold any federal office, be a convicted felon, or be convicted of any misdemeanor involving a violation of the public trust.
Wyoming: Article 4	30	5 years (at election)	Yes	Yes		Yes	Any governor who asks for, receives, or agrees to receive a bribe automatically forfeits his office and his right to hold any other office in Wyoming upon his conviction.

== See also ==
- The flags and seals of governors of the U.S. states
- Gubernatorial lines of succession in the United States
- Governor and lieutenant governor (non-U.S.)
- List of United States governors born outside the United States
- Mexican state governors
- Premier (Australia) – similar position of state/territorial government in Australia
- Premier (Canada) – similar position of provincial/territorial government in Canada
