= Joe Buck (disambiguation) =

Joe Buck (born 1969) is an American sportscaster.

Joe Buck may also refer to:

- Joe Buck (fictional character), the protagonist of the novel Midnight Cowboy, and its film adaptation
- Joe Buck (musician), an American country and punk rock musician
- Joe Buck (politician), mayor of Lake Oswego, Oregon, US
