= 2028 United States elections =

- ← 2026 2027 2028 2029 2030 → Presidential election year
- Election day: November 7
- Incumbent president: ▌Donald Trump (R)
- Next Congress: 121st

Presidential election
- Electoral vote
- Presidential election results map. Numbers indicate electoral votes allotted to the winner of each state or district.

Senate elections
- Seats contested: 35 of the 100 seats (34 seats of Class III + 1 special election)
- Map of the 2028 Senate races Democratic incumbent Republican incumbent No election Incumbent TBD in 2026

House elections
- Seats contested: All 435 voting members and five of six non-voting delegates
- Democratic incumbent Democratic incumbent retiring Republican incumbent Republican incumbent retiring

Gubernatorial elections
- Seats contested: 11 of 50 state governors 2 of 5 territorial governors
- Map of the 2028 gubernatorial elections Democratic incumbent Republican incumbent Term-limited or retiring Republican; New Progressive incumbent Nonpartisan; No election

Elections in the United States are scheduled to be held, in large part, on November 7, 2028. In the presidential election, incumbent Republican president Donald Trump is term-limited due to the 22nd Amendment to the United States Constitution.

All 435 seats in the House of Representatives, and at least 35 of the 100 seats in the U.S. Senate, will be up for election to determine the 121st United States Congress. At least 13 state and territorial U.S. gubernatorial elections, and numerous state and local elections are also scheduled to be contested.

== Background ==
In the 2024 elections, Republicans won a government trifecta for the first time since 2016, with Donald Trump being elected to a non-consecutive second term as president, and Republicans gaining control of the Senate and holding narrow control of the House of Representatives. The 2026 elections then resulted in a divided government with Democrats regaining both houses of Congress.

== Federal elections ==
=== Presidential elections ===
The 2028 United States presidential election will be the 61st quadrennial U.S. presidential election. This presidential election will be under the electoral vote distribution based upon the 2020 census. In each state, the presidential electors who actually elect the president and vice president of the United States will be chosen; a simple majority (270) of the 538 electoral votes is required to win the election.

In the previous election, Donald Trump and the Republican Party won a trifecta. Trump is ineligible to run for a third term, per the term limits established by the 22nd Amendment of the United States Constitution. This will be the first presidential election since 2012 without Trump as the Republican nominee.

=== Senate elections ===
35 seats in the United States Senate will be up for election, including all Class 3 seats. Democrats gained majority control of the Senate in the 2026 United States elections, holding 55 seats, with 1 seat still in contention. Five Democratic-held seats, Georgia, Pennsylvania, Arizona, Nevada, and Ohio are in states won by Donald Trump in the previous presidential election.

=== House of Representatives elections ===
All 435 voting seats in the United States House of Representatives will be up for election. Additionally, elections will be held to select the non-voting delegate for the District of Columbia and the non-voting delegates from 4 of the 5 U.S. territories, including Puerto Rico which its non-voting delegate serves a 4-year term. Tim Burchett has stated that he intends to retire to run for U.S. Senate in Tennessee in 2028 after Marsha Blackburn won the 2026 Tennessee gubernatorial election regardless of whether she appoints him to her newly-vacant Senate seat.

== State elections ==
Partisan control of state governments prior to the 2028 elections: Democratic trifecta up for election Democratic trifecta not up for election Republican trifecta up for election Republican trifecta not up for election Divided government up for election Non-partisan legislature To be determined

Lieutenant gubernatorial elections Democratic incumbent Republican incumbent No election

Attorney general elections Term-limited Republican Democratic incumbent Republican incumbent No election

Secretary of state elections Term-limited Republican Democratic incumbent Republican incumbent No election

Treasurer elections Term-limited Republican Democratic incumbent Republican incumbent No election

Auditor elections Term-limited Republican Democratic incumbent Republican incumbent Nonpartisan No election

=== Gubernatorial elections ===
11 states and two territories will be holding regularly scheduled gubernatorial elections. The governor of 1 state will be term-limited and the governor of another state is retiring.

=== Lieutenant gubernatorial elections ===
Nine states and American Samoa will be holding lieutenant gubernatorial elections.

=== Attorney general elections ===
Ten states will be holding Attorney general elections.

=== Secretary of state elections ===
Seven states will be holding Secretary of State elections.

=== Treasurer elections ===
Nine states will be holding Treasurer elections.

=== Auditor elections ===
Eight states and Guam will be holding state auditor elections.

=== Legislative elections ===
85 state legislative chambers across 44 states will be holding regular legislative elections. 7 chambers across the U.S. territories will be holding legislative elections.

=== State judicial elections ===
Elections are scheduled to be held in 2028, in various states across the country, including supreme courts and appellate courts.

== Local elections ==
=== Mayoral elections ===
==== Eligible incumbents ====
- Aibonito, Puerto Rico: Five-term incumbent William Alicea Pérez is eligible for re-election.
- Arroyo, Puerto Rico: Four-term incumbent Eric Bachier Román is eligible for re-election.
- Bakersfield, California: Three-term incumbent Karen Goh is eligible for re-election.
- Baltimore, Maryland: Two-term incumbent Brandon Scott is running for re-election.
- Barceloneta, Puerto Rico: Four-term incumbent Wanda Soler Rosario is eligible for re-election.
- Barranquitas, Puerto Rico: Two-term incumbent Elliot Colón Blanco is eligible for re-election.
- Baton Rouge, Louisiana: One-term incumbent Sid Edwards is eligible for re-election.
- Bayamón, Puerto Rico: Seven-term incumbent Ramón Luis Rivera Jr. is eligible for re-election.
- Beaverton, Oregon: Two-term incumbent Lacey Beaty is eligible for re-election.
- Berkeley, California: One-term incumbent Adena Ishii is eligible for re-election.
- Blaine, Minnesota: Two-term incumbent Tim Sanders is eligible for re-election.
- Burnsville, Minnesota: Ten-term incumbent Elizabeth Kautz is eligible for re-election.
- Caguas, Puerto Rico: Four-term incumbent William Miranda Torres is eligible for re-election.
- Canóvanas, Puerto Rico: Three-term incumbent Lornna Soto is eligible for re-election.
- Carolina, Puerto Rico: Five-term incumbent José Aponte Dalmau is eligible for re-election.
- Carson City, Nevada: Two-term incumbent Lori Bagwell is eligible for re-election.
- Cayey, Puerto Rico: Eight-term incumbent Rolando Ortiz Velázquez is eligible for re-election.
- Chesapeake, Virginia: Incumbent Rick West is eligible for re-election to a second full term.
- Cheyenne, Wyoming: Two-term incumbent Patrick Collins is eligible for re-election.
- Coamo, Puerto Rico: Seven-term incumbent Juan Carlos García Padilla is eligible for re-election.
- Columbia, Missouri: Two-term incumbent Barbara Buffaloe is eligible for re-election.
- Dorado, Puerto Rico: Incumbent Aníbal José Torres is eligible to run for a full term.
- Doral, Florida: Incumbent Christi Fraga is eligible to run for a second full term.
- Eastover, South Carolina: One-term incumbent James Faber is eligible for re-election.
- El Paso, Texas: One-term incumbent Renard Johnson is eligible for re-election.
- Elizabeth, New Jersey: Nine-term incumbent J. Christian Bollwage is eligible for re-election.
- Englewood, New Jersey: Two-term incumbent Michael Wildes is eligible for re-election.
- Fayetteville, Arkansas: One-term incumbent Molly Rawn is eligible for re-election.
- Florida, Puerto Rico: Four-term incumbent José Gerena Polanco is eligible for re-election.
- Frankfort, Kentucky: Two-term incumbent Layne Wilkerson is eligible for re-election.
- Fremont, California: One-term incumbent Raj Salwan is eligible for re-election.
- Glendale, Arizona: Four-term incumbent Jerry Weiers is eligible for re-election.
- Grand Forks, North Dakota: Two-term incumbent Brandon Bochenski is eligible for re-election.
- Grand Rapids, Michigan: One-term incumbent David LaGrand is eligible for re-election.
- Hagåtña, Guam: One-term incumbent Michael T.C. Gumataotao is eligible for re-election.
- Hormigueros, Puerto Rico: Six-term incumbent Pedro García Figueroa is eligible for re-election.
- Humacao, Puerto Rico: One-term incumbent Rosamar Trujillo Plumey is eligible for re-election.
- Huntsville, Alabama: Five-term incumbent Tommy Battle is eligible for re-election.
- Jayuya, Puerto Rico: Eight-term incumbent Jorge González Otero is eligible for re-election.
- Jonesboro, Arkansas: Two-term incumbent Harold Copenhaver is eligible for re-election.
- Juana Díaz, Puerto Rico: Seven-term incumbent Ramón Hernández Torres is eligible for re-election.
- Juncos, Puerto Rico: Seven-term incumbent Alfredo Alejandro Carrión is eligible for re-election.
- Lancaster, California: Six-term incumbent R. Rex Parris is eligible for re-election.
- Las Marías, Puerto Rico: Three-term incumbent Edwin Soto Santiago is eligible for re-election.
- Las Piedras, Puerto Rico: Five-term incumbent Miguel López Rivera is eligible for re-election.
- Las Vegas, Nevada: One-term incumbent Shelley Berkley is eligible for re-election.
- Luquillo, Puerto Rico: Four-term incumbent Jesús Márquez Rodríguez is eligible for re-election.
- Mesa, Arizona: One-term incumbent Mark Freeman is eligible for re-election.
- Milwaukee, Wisconsin: One-term incumbent Cavalier Johnson is eligible for re-election.
- Morovis, Puerto Rico: Three-term incumbent Carmen Maldonado González is eligible for re-election.
- Naranjito, Puerto Rico: Five-term incumbent Orlando Ortiz Chevres is eligible for re-election.
- Orocovis, Puerto Rico: Seven-term incumbent Jesús Colón Berlingeri is eligible for re-election.
- Pasadena, California: Two-term incumbent Victor Gordo is eligible for re-election.
- Pembroke Pines, Florida: One-term incumbent Angelo Castillo is eligible for re-election.
- Phoenix, Arizona: Two-term incumbent Kate Gallego is eligible for re-election.
- Pine Bluff, Arkansas: One-term incumbent Vivian Flowers is eligible for re-election.
- Ponce, Puerto Rico: One-term incumbent Marlese Sifre is eligible for re-election.
- Portland, Oregon: One-term incumbent Keith Wilson is eligible for re-election.
- Quebradillas, Puerto Rico: Six-term incumbent Heriberto Vélez is eligible for re-election.
- Richmond, Virginia: One-term incumbent Danny Avula is running for re-election.
- Rincón, Puerto Rico: Seven-term incumbent Carlos López Bonilla is eligible for re-election.
- Riverside, California: One-term incumbent Patricia Lock Dawson is eligible for re-election.
- Roanoke, Virginia: One-term incumbent Joe Cobb is eligible for re-election.
- Sacramento, California: One-term incumbent Kevin McCarty is eligible for re-election.
- Saint Paul, Minnesota: One-term incumbent Kaohly Her is eligible for re-election.
- Salem, Oregon: One-term incumbent Vanessa Nordyke is eligible for re-election.
- Salinas, Puerto Rico: Four-term incumbent Karilyn Bonilla Colón is eligible for re-election.
- San Francisco, California: One-term incumbent Daniel Lurie is eligible for re-election.
- San Jose, California: Two-term incumbent Matt Mahan is eligible for re-election.
- San Juan, Puerto Rico: Two-term incumbent Miguel Romero is eligible for re-election.
- Springdale, Arkansas: Five-term incumbent Doug Sprouse is eligible for re-election.
- Tempe, Arizona: Two-term incumbent Corey Woods is eligible for re-election.
- Toa Alta, Puerto Rico: Four-term incumbent Clemente Agosto is eligible for re-election.
- Toa Baja, Puerto Rico: Three-term incumbent Bernardo Márquez García is eligible for re-election.
- Tulsa, Oklahoma: One-term incumbent Monroe Nichols is eligible for re-election.
- Utuado, Puerto Rico: Two-term incumbent Jorge Pérez Heredia is eligible for re-election.
- Vega Alta, Puerto Rico: Two-term incumbent María Vega Pagán is eligible for re-election.
- Vega Baja, Puerto Rico: Four-term incumbent Marcos Cruz Molina is eligible for re-election.
- Virginia Beach, Virginia: Incumbent Bobby Dyer is eligible for re-election to a third full term.
- Wauwatosa, Wisconsin: Two-term incumbent Dennis McBride is eligible for re-election.
- Wilmington, Delaware: One-term incumbent John Carney is eligible for re-election.
- Winston-Salem, North Carolina: Seven-term incumbent Allen Joines is eligible for re-election.
- Yabucoa, Puerto Rico: Four-term incumbent Rafael Surillo is eligible for re-election.

==== Ineligible or retiring incumbents ====
- Austin, Texas: Two-term incumbent Kirk Watson is term-limited and ineligible to run.
- Cranston, Rhode Island: Two-term incumbent Kenneth Hopkins is term-limited and ineligible to run.
- Fort Lauderdale, Florida: Three-term incumbent Dean Trantalis is term-limited and ineligible to run.
- Fresno, California: Two-term incumbent Jerry Dyer is term-limited and ineligible to run.
- Honolulu, Hawaii: Two-term incumbent Rick Blangiardi is term-limited and ineligible to run.
- Lake Oswego, Oregon: Two-term incumbent Joe Buck is term-limited and ineligible to run.
- Matanuska-Susitna Borough, Alaska: Two-term incumbent Edna DeVries is term-limited and ineligible to run.
- Norfolk, Virginia: Three-term incumbent Kenny Alexander is retiring.
- San Diego, California: Two-term incumbent Todd Gloria is term-limited and ineligible to run.

== Table of state, territorial, and federal results ==
This table shows the partisan results of presidential, congressional, gubernatorial, and state legislative races held in each state and territory in 2028. Note that not all states and territories hold gubernatorial, state legislative, and Senate elections in 2028. The five territories and Washington, D.C. do not elect members of the Senate, and the territories do not take part in presidential elections; instead, they each elect one non-voting member of the House. Nebraska's unicameral legislature and the governorship and the legislature of American Samoa are elected on a non-partisan basis, and political party affiliation is not listed.

State/Territory	2026 PVI	Before 2028 elections				After 2028 elections				
State/Territory	2026 PVI	Governor	State leg.	U.S. Senate	U.S. House	Pres. (Note: This column reflects the individual who won a plurality of the state's popular vote in the 2028 presidential election.)	Governor	State leg.	U.S. Senate	U.S. House
Alabama	R+15	Rep	Rep	Rep	Rep 5–2	TBD	Rep	Rep	TBD	TBD
Alaska	R+6	Dem	Coalition (Note: Both of Alaska's legislative chambers are led by a bipartisan coalition.)	Split	Rep 1–0	TBD	TBD	TBD	TBD	TBD
Arizona	R+2	Dem	Dem	Dem	Dem 5–4	TBD	Dem	TBD	TBD	TBD
Arkansas	R+15	Rep	Rep	Rep	Rep 4–0	TBD	Rep	TBD	TBD	TBD
California	D+12	Dem	Dem	Dem	TBD	TBD	Dem	TBD	TBD	TBD
Colorado	D+6	Dem	Dem	Dem	Dem 7–1	TBD	Dem	TBD	TBD	TBD
Connecticut	D+8	Dem	Dem	Dem	Dem 5–0	TBD	Dem	TBD	TBD	TBD
Delaware	D+8	Dem	Dem	Dem	Dem 1–0	TBD	TBD	TBD	TBD	TBD
Florida	R+5	Rep	Rep	Rep	Rep 20–7	TBD	Rep	TBD	TBD	TBD
Georgia	R+1	Dem	Split	Dem	Rep 9–5	TBD	Dem	TBD	TBD	TBD
Hawaii	D+13	Dem	Dem	Dem	Dem 2–0	TBD	Dem	TBD	TBD	TBD
Idaho	R+18	Rep	Rep	Rep	Rep 2–0	TBD	Rep	TBD	TBD	TBD
Illinois	D+6	Dem	Dem	Dem	Dem 14–3	TBD	Dem	TBD	TBD	TBD
Indiana	R+9	Rep	Rep	Rep	Rep 6–3	TBD	TBD	TBD	TBD	TBD
Iowa	R+6	Dem	Rep	Split	Dem 3–1	TBD	Dem	TBD	TBD	TBD
Kansas	R+8	Dem	Rep	Split	Rep 3–1	TBD	Dem	TBD	TBD	TBD
Kentucky	R+15	TBD	Rep	Rep	Rep 4–2	TBD	TBD	TBD	TBD	TBD
Louisiana	R+11	TBD	TBD	Rep	TBD	TBD	TBD	TBD	TBD	TBD
Maine	D+4	Dem	Dem	Split D/I (Note: One of Maine's senators, Troy Jackson, is a Democrat. The other senator from Maine, Angus King, is an independent who has caucused with Democrats since taking office in 2013.)	Split 1–1	TBD	Dem	TBD	TBD	TBD
Maryland	D+15	Dem	Dem	Dem	Dem 7–1	TBD	Dem	Dem	TBD	TBD
Massachusetts	D+14	Dem	Dem	Dem	Dem 9–0	TBD	Dem	TBD	TBD	TBD
Michigan	EVEN	Dem	Dem	Dem	Dem 9–4	TBD	Dem	TBD	TBD	TBD
Minnesota	D+3	Dem	Dem	Dem	Dem 5–3	TBD	Dem	TBD	TBD	TBD
Mississippi	R+11	TBD	TBD	Split	Rep 3–1	TBD	TBD	TBD	TBD	TBD
Missouri	R+9	Rep	Rep	Rep	Rep 5–3	TBD	TBD	TBD	TBD	TBD
Montana	R+10	Rep	Rep	Rep	Split 1–1	TBD	TBD	TBD	TBD	TBD
Nebraska	R+10	Rep	NP (Note: The unicameral Nebraska Legislature and the legislature of American Samoa are officially nonpartisan.)	Rep	Rep 2–1	TBD	Rep	NP	TBD	TBD
Nevada	R+1	Dem	Dem	Dem	Dem 4–0	TBD	Dem	TBD	TBD	TBD
New Hampshire	D+2	Rep	Dem	Dem	Dem 2–0	TBD	TBD	TBD	TBD	TBD
New Jersey	D+4	Dem	TBD	Dem	Dem 11–1	TBD	TBD	TBD	TBD	TBD
New Mexico	D+4	Dem	Dem	Dem	Dem 3–0	TBD	Dem	TBD	TBD	TBD
New York	D+8	Dem	Dem	Dem	Dem 20–6	TBD	Dem	TBD	TBD	TBD
North Carolina	R+1	Dem	Split	Split	Dem 11–3	TBD	TBD	TBD	TBD	TBD
North Dakota	R+18	Rep	Rep	Rep	Rep 1–0	TBD	TBD	TBD	TBD	TBD
Ohio	R+5	Dem	Rep	Split	Dem 8–7	TBD	Dem	TBD	TBD	TBD
Oklahoma	R+17	Rep	Rep	Rep	Rep 5–0	TBD	Rep	TBD	TBD	TBD
Oregon	D+8	Dem	Dem	Dem	Dem 5–1	TBD	Dem	TBD	TBD	TBD
Pennsylvania	R+1	Dem	Dem	Split	Dem 11–6	TBD	Dem	TBD	TBD	TBD
Rhode Island	D+8	Dem	Dem	Dem	Dem 2–0	TBD	Dem	TBD	TBD	TBD
South Carolina	R+8	Rep	Rep	Split	Rep 5–2	TBD	Rep	TBD	TBD	TBD
South Dakota	R+15	Rep	Rep	Rep	Rep 1–0	TBD	Rep	TBD	TBD	TBD
Tennessee	R+14	Rep	Rep	Rep	Rep 8–1	TBD	Rep	TBD	TBD	TBD
Texas	R+6	Dem	Split	Split	Rep 24–14	TBD	Dem	TBD	TBD	TBD
Utah	R+11	Rep	Rep	Rep	Rep 3–1	TBD	TBD	TBD	TBD	TBD
Vermont	D+17	Rep	Dem	Split D/I (Note: One of Vermont's senators, Peter Welch, is a Democrat. The other senator from Vermont, Bernie Sanders, was elected as an independent and has caucused with Democrats since taking office in 2007.)	Dem 1–0	TBD	TBD	TBD	TBD	TBD
Virginia	D+3	Dem	TBD	Dem	Dem 8–3	TBD	TBD	TBD	TBD	TBD
Washington	D+10	Dem	Dem	Dem	Dem 8–2	TBD	TBD	TBD	TBD	TBD
West Virginia	R+21	Rep	Rep	Rep	Rep 2–0	TBD	TBD	TBD	TBD	TBD
Wisconsin	EVEN	Dem	Dem	Split	Split 4–4	TBD	Dem	TBD	TBD	TBD
Wyoming	R+23	Rep	Rep	Rep	Rep 1–0	TBD	Rep	TBD	TBD	TBD
United States	EVEN	Dem	Dem	Dem	Dem	TBD	TBD	TBD	TBD	TBD
Washington, D.C.	D+44	Dem (Note: The federal district does not have a governor or state legislature but elects the mayor of Washington, D.C., the Council of the District of Columbia, and a non-voting delegate to the House of Representatives.)	Dem	—N/a	Dem	TBD	Dem	TBD	—N/a	TBD
American Samoa	—N/a	NP (Note: Although elections for governor of American Samoa are non-partisan, Governor Pula Nikolao Pula affiliates with the Republican Party.)	NP	—N/a	Rep	—N/a (Note: Some territories hold non-binding advisory votes for president, such as the 2024 Guam presidential straw poll, but these advisory votes do not elect members of the Electoral College and thus do not influence the final outcome of the presidential election.)	NP	NP	—N/a	TBD
Guam	—N/a	Rep	Rep	—N/a	Dem	—N/a	Rep	TBD	—N/a	TBD
N. Mariana Islands	—N/a	TBD	TBD	—N/a	Rep	—N/a	TBD	TBD	—N/a	TBD
Puerto Rico	—N/a	PNP/R (Note: Puerto Rico's Jenniffer González is a member of the New Progressive Party, but affiliates with the Republican Party at the national level.)	PNP	—N/a	PDP/D (Note: Puerto Rico's Pablo Hernández Rivera is a member of the Popular Democratic Party, but affiliates with the Democratic Party at the national level.)	—N/a	TBD	TBD	—N/a	TBD
U.S. Virgin Islands	—N/a	Dem	Dem	—N/a	Dem	—N/a	Dem	TBD	—N/a	TBD
State/Territory	2026 PVI	Governor	State leg.	U.S. Senate	U.S. House	Pres.	Governor	State leg.	U.S. Senate	U.S. House
State/Territory	2026 PVI	Before 2028 elections				After 2028 elections				

== Elections by state or territory ==
- Alabama
- Alaska
- Arizona
- Arkansas
- California
- Colorado
- Connecticut
- Delaware
- District of Columbia
- Florida
- Georgia
- Guam
- Hawaii
- Idaho
- Illinois
- Indiana
- Iowa
- Kansas
- Kentucky
- Louisiana
- Maine
- Maryland
- Massachusetts
- Michigan
- Minnesota
- Mississippi
- Missouri
- Montana
- Nebraska
- Nevada
- New Hampshire
- New Jersey
- New Mexico
- New York
- North Carolina
- North Dakota
- Northern Mariana Islands
- Ohio
- Oklahoma
- Oregon
- Pennsylvania
- Rhode Island
- South Carolina
- South Dakota
- Tennessee
- Texas
- Utah
- Vermont
- Virginia
- Washington
- West Virginia
- Wisconsin
- Wyoming
