= Doug Sprouse =

Mayor of Springdale, Arkansas, since 2009

Mayor of Springdale, Arkansas
- Incumbent
- Assumed office January 1, 2009

Personal details
- Born: Douglas E. Sprouse Fort Smith, Arkansas, U.S.
- Spouse: Sandy Hunt (m. 1977)
- Education: Springdale High School; University of Arkansas

Douglas E. Sprouse is an American politician who has served as the mayor of Springdale, Arkansas, since 2009. Having co-founded a furniture store in 1983, Sprouse was elected to the Springdale School Board in 1999 and to the mayor's office in 2008.

== Early life and education ==
Doug Sprouse was born in Fort Smith, Arkansas, and moved to Fayetteville at age two. In the second grade, at age eight, his family moved from Fayetteville to Springdale, where Sprouse has remained since. In school, he played American football. He met his wife, Sandy (née Hunt), in their junior year at Springdale High School, stating in 2016, "I was drawn to her because she was fun. She was into drama. She was junior class president." They both graduated from high school in 1975 and in 1977 were married. He went on to attend the University of Arkansas.

== Career ==
In 1983, along with his father, Gene, and the support of his father-in-law, Leroy Hunt, he started Sprouse Upholstery, Inc., a furniture shop. Today, Sprouse's wife manages the store.

=== Politics ===
In 1999, Sprouse successfully ran for the Springdale School Board, of which he served as president from 2005 to 2007. In 2008, he was elected mayor of Springdale. He was reelected in 2012, 2016, 2020 and 2024, and is term-limited in the 2026 election. He additionally served as vice-chairman of the Regional Mobility Authority and is a member of the Executive Committee of the Arkansas Municipal League, having served as the president of the AML from 2017 to 2018.

In 2019, Springdale was declared a "pro-life city"; sprouse publicly supported the move. In 2023, Sprouse told Politico that he was most concerned about affordable housing. He attended the 2024 National League of Cities conference in Washington, D.C.

In December 2025, Sprouse publicly stated that the Springdale Police Department "do[es] not patrol for immigration violations" following the publication of a report by the Associated Press calling Benton County a "'hot spot' for ICE efforts"; in early March 2026, Springdale High School students organized a large walkout in protest of ICE. Sprouse is set to "greet" participants in the NWA March for Life on September 13, 2026. He is a speaker at The Summit, a luncheon for businesspeople.

== Personal life ==
Sprouse met his wife Sandy (née Hunt) in their junior year of high school; they were married in 1977. Sandy is the daughter of Leroy Hunt, a furniture shop owner. Together, their three children are Phillip, a Tyson Foods senior sales analyst; Andy, a fireman; and Bonnie, a Steven Thetford Photography artwork specialist.

Sprouse is Christian, and frequently references God in interviews. He is a member of Cross Church Springdale, a Southern Baptist Convention megachurch.
