= Land commissioner =

A land commissioner or natural resources commissioner is a public official in the executive branch of a state or territory in the United States. While the duties of the position may vary, their general role is maintaining, protecting, and regulating public lands and natural resources, including state parks, forests, and recreation areas. Every state except Wyoming has a natural resources commissioner.

Five states – Arkansas, New Mexico, South Dakota, Texas, and Washington – elect land commissioners in partisan elections, with Arkansas, South Dakota, and New Mexico additionally dividing the duties between a partisan elected office and a nonpartisan appointed office. In all other states, the position is nonpartisan and appointed, usually by the governor.

The National Association of State Trust Lands is a nonprofit consortium of state land commissioners.

== List of current land commissioners ==
As of October 2, 2024, the various land commissioners are:

Office	Name	Elected/Appointed
Alabama Commissioner of Conservation and Natural Resources	Christopher Blankenship	Appointed
Alaska Commissioner of Natural Resources	John Boyle	Appointed
Arizona Commissioner of Lands	Robyn Sahid	Appointed
Arkansas Commissioner of State Lands	Tommy Land	Elected (partisan)
Arkansas Executive Director of Natural Resources Commission	Chris Colclasure	Appointed
California Secretary for Natural Resources	Wade Crowfoot	Appointed
Colorado Executive Director of Natural Resources	Dan Gibbs	Appointed
Connecticut Commissioner of Energy and Environmental Protection	Katie Scharf Dykes	Appointed
Delaware Secretary of Natural Resources and Environmental Control	Shawn Garvin	Appointed
Florida Secretary of Environmental Protection	Shawn Hamilton	Appointed
Georgia Commissioner of Natural Resources	Walter Rabon	Appointed
Hawaii Chairperson of Land and Natural Resources	Dawn N. S. Chang	Appointed
Idaho Director of Lands	Dustin Miller	Appointed
Illinois Director of Natural Resources	Natalie Phelps Finnie	Appointed
Indiana Director of Natural Resources	Dan Bortner	Appointed
Iowa Director of Natural Resources	Kayla Lyon	Appointed
Kansas Secretary of Wildlife and Parks	Chris Kennedy	Appointed
Kentucky Commissioner of Natural Resources	Gordon Slone	Appointed
Louisiana Secretary of Natural Resources	Tyler Gray	Appointed
Maine Commissioner of Agriculture, Conservation, and Forestry	Amanda Beal	Appointed
Maryland Secretary of Natural Resources	Josh Kurtz	Appointed
Massachusetts Secretary of Energy and Environmental Affairs	Rebecca Tepper	Appointed
Michigan Director of Natural Resources	Scott Bowen	Appointed
Minnesota Commissioner of Natural Resources	Sarah Strommen	Appointed
Mississippi Executive Director of Environmental Quality	Chris Wells	Appointed
Missouri Director of Natural Resources	Dru Buntin	Appointed
Montana Director of Natural Resources and Conservation	Amanda Kaster	Appointed
Nebraska Director of Natural Resources	Vacant	Appointed
Nevada Director of Conservation and Natural Resources	James A. Settelmeyer	Appointed
New Hampshire Executive Director of Fish and Game	Vacant	Appointed
New Jersey Commissioner of Environmental Protection	Ed Potosnak	Appointed
New Mexico Commissioner of Public Lands	Stephanie Garcia Richard	Elected (partisan)
New Mexico Secretary of Energy Minerals and Natural Resources	Melanie Kenderdine	Appointed
New York Commissioner of Environmental Conservation	Sean Mahar	Appointed
North Carolina Secretary of Environmental Quality	Elizabeth Biser	Appointed
Ohio Director of Natural Resources	Mary Mertz	Appointed
Oklahoma Director of Wildlife Conservation	Wade Free	Appointed
Pennsylvania Secretary of Conservation and Natural Resources	Cindy Adams Dunn	Appointed
South Carolina Director of Natural Resources	Robert Boyles	Appointed
South Dakota Commissioner of School and Public Lands	Brock Greenfield	Elected (partisan)
South Dakota Secretary of Agriculture and Natural Resources	Hunter Roberts	Appointed
South Dakota Secretary of Environment and Natural Resources	Vacant	Appointed
Tennessee Commissioner of Environment and Conservation	David Salyers	Appointed
Texas Land Commissioner	Dawn Buckingham	Elected (partisan)
Utah Director of Natural Resources	Joel Ferry	Appointed
Vermont Secretary of Natural Resources	Julie Moore	Appointed
Virginia Secretary of Natural and Historic Resources	Travis Voyles	Appointed
Washington Commissioner of Public Lands	Dave Upthegrove	Elected (partisan)
West Virginia Director of Natural Resources	Brett McMillion	Appointed
Wisconsin Secretary of Natural Resources	Vacant	Appointed

== See also ==
- Bureau of Land Management, an agency within the United States Department of the Interior
- Department of Natural Resources (disambiguation)
- Public land, land held by central or local governments
