= Joe Buck (politician) =

American politician and businessman

Mayor of Lake Oswego
- Incumbent
- Assumed office January 1, 2021

Member of the Lake Oswego City Council
- In office 2014–2017

Personal details
- Education: University of Portland (BBA)

Military service
- Branch/service: United States Coast Guard
- Years of service: 2001-2004

Joe Buck is an American politician and restaurateur. Buck grew up in the Lake Grove neighborhood of Lake Oswego, Oregon.

He enlisted in the U.S. Coast Guard where he served from 2001-2004. While in the Coast Guard he was stationed in Clearwater, Florida. After Buck left the Coast Guard, he attended the University of Portland and graduated with a bachelor's degree in business administration and accounting. He served as a member of the Lake Oswego City Council from 2014-2017 before taking a break from politics.

Buck was elected Mayor of Lake Oswego in 2020 and reelected in 2024; his current term expires at the end of 2028. In addition to his duties as Mayor, Buck owns and operates several restaurants in Lake Oswego, including Gubanc's Restaurant, Babica Hen, and Lola's Cafe. Buck lives in the Lake Grove neighborhood of Lake Oswego.
