= 2029 United States gubernatorial elections =

- November 6, 2029

2 governorships
Party	Republican	Democratic
- Democratic incumbent Term-limited Democrat

Gubernatorial elections are scheduled to be held in the United States on November 6, 2029, in the states of New Jersey and Virginia. The last regular gubernatorial elections for both states were in 2025.

== Race summary ==
=== States ===
State	Governor	Party	First elected	Last race	Status	Candidates
New Jersey	Mikie Sherrill	Democratic	2025	56.9% D	Incumbent’s intent unknown	TBD
Virginia	Abigail Spanberger	Democratic	2025	57.6% D	Incumbent term-limited	TBD

== New Jersey ==
Governor Mikie Sherrill was elected in 2025 with 56.9% of the vote. She is eligible to run for re-election to a second term, but has not stated if she would do so. Ahead of the Republican primary, state assemblymember Brian Bergen has expressed interest in running, while state senator Mike Testa is viewed as a potential candidate.

== Virginia ==
Governor Abigail Spanberger was elected in 2025 with 57.6% of the vote. Spanberger is ineligible to run for re-election to a second consecutive term, as the state prohibits governors from serving consecutive terms.

Ahead of the Democratic primary, speaker of the House of Delegates Don Scott has publicly expressed interest in running. Lieutenant governor Ghazala Hashmi and attorney general Jay Jones have been mentioned as potential candidates for the nomination.

Ahead of the Republican primary, former attorney general Jason Miyares has also expressed interest in running. U.S. representative Rob Wittman is mentioned as a potential contender for the nomination, while former governor Glenn Youngkin stated he "had no plans" to run.

Local activist Daryl Washington, founder of the Confederate Party of America, has also expressed interest in running.
