= 2028 United States gubernatorial elections =

- November 7, 2028

13 governorships 11 states; 2 territories
Party	Republican	Democratic
- Democratic incumbent Republican incumbent Term-limited or retiring Republican; New Progressive incumbent Nonpartisan; No election

United States gubernatorial elections are scheduled to be held on November 7, 2028, in the states of Delaware, Indiana, Missouri, Montana, North Carolina, North Dakota, Utah, Washington, West Virginia, New Hampshire, and Vermont. These elections form part of the 2028 United States elections. The last regular gubernatorial elections for nine of these states were in 2024. The governors of New Hampshire and Vermont are elected to two year terms and were last elected in 2026. Republicans are defending two governorships in states Kamala Harris won in 2024, while Democrats are defending one governorship in a state Donald Trump won in 2024.

== Race summary ==
=== States ===
State	Governor	Party	First elected	Last race	Status	Candidates
Delaware	Matt Meyer	Democratic	2024	56.1% D	Incumbent’s intent unknown	TBD
Indiana	Mike Braun	Republican	2024	54.4% R	Incumbent running	▌Mike Braun (Republican)
Missouri	Mike Kehoe	Republican	2024	59.1% R	Incumbent running	▌Mike Kehoe (Republican)
Montana	Greg Gianforte	Republican	2020	58.9% R	Incumbent term-limited	TBD
New Hampshire	Kelly Ayotte	Republican	2024	51.4% R	Incumbent’s intent unknown	TBD
North Carolina	Josh Stein	Democratic	2024	54.9% D	Incumbent’s intent unknown	TBD
North Dakota	Kelly Armstrong	Republican	2024	68.3% R	Incumbent’s intent unknown	TBD
Utah	Spencer Cox	Republican	2020	52.9% R	Incumbent retiring	TBD
Vermont	Phil Scott	Republican	2016	52.4% R	Incumbent’s intent unknown	TBD
Washington	Bob Ferguson	Democratic	2024	55.5% D	Incumbent’s intent unknown	TBD
West Virginia	Patrick Morrisey	Republican	2024	62.0% R	Incumbent’s intent unknown	TBD

=== Territories ===
Territory	Governor	Party	First elected	Last race	Status	Candidates
American Samoa	Pula Nikolao Pula	Republican (Note: The governor of American Samoa is elected on a nonpartisan basis, although individuals do affiliate with national parties. In Pula's case, this is with the Republican Party.)	2024	59.8% NP/R	Incumbent’s intent unknown	TBD
Puerto Rico	Jenniffer González-Colón	New Progressive (Note: González-Colón affiliates with the Republican Party on the national level.)	2024	41.2% PNP/R	Incumbent’s intent unknown	TBD

== Delaware ==
Governor Matt Meyer was elected in 2024 with 56.07% of the vote. He is eligible to run for re-election but has not yet stated if he will do so.

== Indiana ==
Governor Mike Braun was elected in 2024 with 54.38% of the vote. He is eligible to run for re-election. He announced his candidacy on November 16, 2026.

Attorney General Todd Rokita is seen as a potential primary opponent to Braun.

== Missouri ==
Governor Mike Kehoe was elected in 2024 with 59.14% of the vote. He is running for re-election to a second term.

Kansas City mayor Quinton Lucas, who will be term-limited in his current position in 2027, has formed an exploratory committee as a potential Democratic candidate.

== Montana ==
Governor Greg Gianforte was re-elected in 2024 with 58.86% of the vote. He will be term-limited by the Constitution of Montana and cannot seek re-election to a third consecutive term.

Attorney General Austin Knudsen, United States Representative Troy Downing, and Lieutenant Governor Kristen Juras are all seen as potential Republican candidates. Meanwhile, 2024 Democratic nominee for governor Ryan Busse, Democratic nominee for MT-01 in 2022 and 2024 Monica Tranel, and former chief legal counsel to Governor Steve Bullock Raph Graybill are all seen as potential Democratic candidates.

== New Hampshire ==
Governor Kelly Ayotte was re-elected to a second term in 2026 with 51.43% of the vote. Because New Hampshire does not have gubernatorial term limits in its Constitution, she will be eligible to run for re-election for a third term.

== North Carolina ==
Governor Josh Stein was elected in 2024 with 54.90% of the vote. He is eligible to run for re-election but has not yet stated if he will do so.

Robert Burns, the Republican mayor of Monroe, announced his candidacy on November 18, 2026. State Auditor Dave Boliek is also seen as a potential candidate.

== North Dakota ==
Governor Kelly Armstrong was elected in 2024 with 68.26% of the vote. He is eligible to run for re-election but has not yet stated if he will do so.

== Utah ==
Governor Spencer Cox was re-elected in 2024 with 52.89% of the vote. He is eligible to run for re-election but has stated he will not.

U.S. Senator John Curtis and former U.S. Representative Jason Chaffetz have both expressed interest in a possible campaign. Other potential candidates include Utah House Speaker Mike Schultz, Lieutenant Governor Deidre Henderson, U.S. Representative Blake Moore, and businessmen Jeremy Andrus and Brad Bonham.

== Vermont ==
Governor Phil Scott was re-elected to a sixth term in 2026 with 52.43% of the vote. Because Vermont does not have gubernatorial term limits in its Constitution, he will be eligible to run in 2028 for a seventh term.

== Washington ==
Governor Bob Ferguson was elected in 2024 with 55.51% of the vote. He is eligible to run for re-election but has not yet stated if he will do so.

State Representative and Chair of the Washington State Republican Party Jim Walsh has expressed interest in running.

State Superintendent of Public Instruction Chris Reykdal is seen as a potential Democratic challenger to Bob Ferguson after saying he would not run for a fourth term as superintendent in 2028.

== West Virginia ==
Governor Patrick Morrisey was elected in 2024 with 61.99% of the vote. He is eligible to run for re-election but has not yet stated if he will do so.

Former governor and U.S. Senator Jim Justice and former governor and Senator Joe Manchin are seen as potential candidates. Secretary of State Kris Warner and State Treasurer Larry Pack are also rumored to be candidates.

== Territories ==
=== American Samoa ===
Governor Pula Nikolao Pula was elected in 2024 with 59.83% of the vote in a runoff. He is eligible to run for re-election and has expressed interest in doing so.

=== Puerto Rico ===
Governor Jenniffer González-Colón was elected in 2024 with 41.22% of the vote. She is eligible to run for re-election but has not yet stated if she will do so.
