= 2027 United States gubernatorial elections =

- November 2, 2027; October 9 (Louisiana)

3 governorships
Party	Democratic	Republican
Current seats	30	20
Seats up	1	2
- Term-limited Democrat; Republican incumbent Term-limited Republican; No election

The 2027 United States gubernatorial elections are scheduled to be held on November 2, 2027, in the states of Kentucky and Mississippi, as well as an election in Louisiana on October 9, 2027. (Note: If no candidate receives a majority in the Louisiana primary, a runoff between the top two finishers will be held on November 20.) In addition, special elections may take place (depending on state law) if other gubernatorial seats are vacated. These elections form part of the 2027 United States elections. The last regular gubernatorial elections for all three states were in 2023.

== Partisan composition ==
Going into this election, there are 30 Democratic governors and 20 Republican governors in the United States. Democrats hold one governorship up for election in a state that Donald Trump won in 2024 (Kentucky). Republicans hold no governorships up for election in states that Kamala Harris won in 2024.

== Race summary ==
State	Governor	Party	First elected	Last race	Status	Candidates
Kentucky	Andy Beshear	Democratic	2019	52.5% D	Incumbent term-limited	▌Rocky Adkins (Democratic); ▌Jacqueline Coleman (Democratic); ▌James Comer (Republican)
Louisiana	Jeff Landry	Republican	2023	51.6% R	Incumbent's intent unknown	▌Gary Crockett (Democratic)
Mississippi	Tate Reeves	Republican	2019	50.9% R	Incumbent term-limited	▌Lynn Fitch (Republican); ▌Andy Gipson (Republican); ▌Philip Gunn (Republican); ▌Shad White (Republican); ▌Ivana Williams (Democratic); ▌Priscilla Williams-Till (Democratic)

== Kentucky ==
Governor Andy Beshear was re-elected in 2023 with 52.5% of the vote. He is term-limited by the Kentucky Constitution and cannot seek re-election to a third consecutive term. U.S. representative from Kentucky's first congressional district James Comer declared his candidacy on November 16th.

== Louisiana ==
Governor Jeff Landry was elected in 2023 with 51.6% of the vote. He is eligible to run for re-election but has not stated if he will do so.

== Mississippi ==
Governor Tate Reeves was re-elected in 2023 with 50.9% of the vote. He is term-limited by the Mississippi Constitution and cannot seek re-election to a third term. Democratic nominee in 2023 and former Mississippi Public Service Commissioner Brandon Presley is listed as a potential candidate.

== See also ==
- List of elections in 2027
