= 2027 United States electoral calendar =

2027 elections in the United States

This is a list of elections in the United States scheduled to be held in 2027.

== February ==
- February 23: Chicago, Mayor

== March ==
- March 2: Tampa, Mayor (first round)
- March 23: Jacksonville, Mayor (primary)

== April ==
- April 6:
  - Anchorage, Mayor
  - Colorado
    - Colorado Springs, Mayor
    - Denver, Mayor
  - Wisconsin Supreme Court, election
- April 27: Tampa, Mayor (runoff)

== May ==
- May 4: Columbus, Mayor (primary)
- May 18: Jacksonville, Mayor (general)

== June ==
- June: Cherokee Nation, elections
- June 23: Kansas City, Mayor

== July ==
- July 10: Choctaw Nation, elections

== August ==
- August 5: Nashville, Mayor

== November ==
- November 2:
  - Columbus, Mayor (general)
  - Kentucky, elections
  - Louisiana, elections
  - Minnesota, U.S. Senate (special)
  - Mississippi, elections
  - New Jersey, State Senate and General Assembly
  - Virginia, State Senate and House of Delegates
  - Philadelphia City Council, election
  - Philadelphia, Mayor
  - Indianapolis, Mayor
  - Orlando, Mayor

== Unknown date ==
- Republican National Committee, Chair

== See also ==
- 2027 United States elections
