= 2027 United States elections =

- ← 2025 2026 2027 2028 2029 → Off-year elections
- Election day: November 2

Senate election
- Seats contested: 1 mid-term vacancy
- Map of the 2027 Senate special elections Incumbent to be determined

Gubernatorial elections
- Seats contested: 3
- Term-limited Democrat; Republican incumbent Term-limited Republican

Elections are scheduled to be held in the United States, in large part, on November 2, 2027. The off-year election includes gubernatorial and state legislative elections in a few states, as well as numerous mayoral races, and a variety of other local offices on the ballot as well as potential ballot measures in some states. Special elections to the United States Congress will take place if vacancies arise.

== Federal elections ==
=== Senate ===
- Minnesota Class 1: Four-term Democrat Amy Klobuchar is expected to resign by January 4, 2027, to become Governor of Minnesota after winning the state's 2026 gubernatorial election. An interim senator will be appointed, either by outgoing governor Tim Walz or herself depending on when she resigns, who will serve until the special election. Klobuchar indicated she would make the appointment.

== State elections ==
Lieutenant gubernatorial elections Term-limited Republican Republican incumbent No election

Attorney general elections Republican incumbent retiring Republican incumbent No election

Secretary of state elections Term-limited or retiring Republican Republican incumbent No election

Treasurer elections Republican incumbent No election

Auditor elections Republican incumbent retiring Republican incumbent No election

=== Gubernatorial elections ===
Three states will hold gubernatorial elections in 2027:

- Kentucky: Two-term Democrat Andy Beshear is term-limited and ineligible to seek re-election.
- Louisiana: One-term Republican Jeff Landry is eligible for re-election. He has not indicated whether he will run for a second term.
- Mississippi: Two-term Republican Tate Reeves is term-limited and ineligible to seek re-election.

=== Lieutenant gubernatorial elections ===
Two states will be holding lieutenant gubernatorial elections.

=== Attorney general elections ===
Three states will be holding Attorney general elections.

=== Secretary of state elections ===
Three states will be holding Secretary of State elections.

=== Treasurer elections ===
Three states will be holding Treasurer elections.

=== Auditor elections ===
Two states will be holding state auditor elections.

=== Legislative ===
Legislative elections will be held for both houses of the Louisiana State Legislature, the Mississippi Legislature, the New Jersey Legislature, and the Virginia General Assembly. Kentucky, which holds gubernatorial elections in off-years, holds state legislative elections concurrent with presidential and midterm elections.

=== Judicial ===
Incumbent Justice Annette Ziegler is not running for reelection.

== Local elections ==
=== Mayoral elections ===
A number of major U.S. cities will hold mayoral elections in 2027.

==== Eligible incumbents ====
- Akron, Ohio: One-term incumbent Shammas Malik is eligible for re-election.
- Albany, Georgia: Two-term incumbent Bo Dorough is eligible for re-election.
- Alexandria, Virginia: One-term incumbent Alyia Gaskins is eligible for re-election.
- Amarillo, Texas: Two-term incumbent Cole Stanley is eligible for re-election
- Anchorage, Alaska: One-term incumbent Suzanne LaFrance is eligible for re-election.
- Arabi, Georgia: One-term incumbent Brooke Huckaby is running for re-election.
- Augusta, Maine: Two-term incumbent Mark O'Brien is eligible for re-election.
- Aurora, Colorado: Two-term incumbent Mike Coffman is eligible for re-election.
- Bergenfield, New Jersey: Two-term incumbent Arvin Amatorio is eligible for re-election.
- Bloomington, Minnesota: Two-term incumbent Tim Busse is eligible for re-election.
- Boise, Idaho: Two-term incumbent Lauren McLean is eligible for re-election.
- Bridgeport, Connecticut: Three-term incumbent Joe Ganim is running for re-election.
- Burlington, North Carolina: One-term incumbent Beth Kennett is eligible for re-election.
- Burlington, Vermont: One-term incumbent Emma Mulvaney-Stanak is eligible for re-election.
- Cary, North Carolina: Five-term incumbent Harold Weinbrecht is eligible for re-election.
- Chapel Hill, North Carolina: Two-term incumbent Jessica Anderson is eligible for re-election.
- Charleston, South Carolina: One-term incumbent William S. Cogswell Jr. is eligible for re-election.
- Chester, Pennsylvania: One-term incumbent Stefan Roots is eligible for re-election.
- Chicago, Illinois: One-term incumbent Brandon Johnson is eligible for re-election.
- Claremont, New Hampshire: Three-term incumbent Dale Girard is eligible for re-election.
- Colorado Springs, Colorado: One-term incumbent Yemi Mobolade is running for re-election.
- Columbus, Ohio: Three-term incumbent Andrew Ginther is running for re-election.
- Concord, New Hampshire: Two-term incumbent Byron Champlin is eligible for re-election.
- Danbury, Connecticut: Two-term incumbent Roberto Alves is eligible for re-election.
- Danville, Illinois: Two-term incumbent Rickey Williams Jr. is running for re-election.
- Denver, Colorado: One-term incumbent Mike Johnston is eligible for re-election.
- Des Moines, Iowa: One-term incumbent Connie Boesen is eligible for re-election.
- Duluth, Minnesota: One-term incumbent Roger Reinert is eligible for re-election.
- Durham, North Carolina: Two-term incumbent Leonardo Williams is eligible for re-election.
- Fayetteville, Georgia: Three-term incumbent Edward J Johnson Jr is eligible for re-election.
- Fayetteville, North Carolina: Five-term incumbent Mitch Colvin is eligible for re-election.
- Fort Lee, New Jersey: Five-term incumbent Mark Sokolich is eligible for re-election.
- Fort Wayne, Indiana: One-term incumbent Sharon Tucker is eligible for re-election.
- Fort Worth, Texas: Three-term incumbent Mattie Parker is eligible for re-election.
- Gary, Indiana: One-term incumbent Eddie Melton is eligible for re-election.
- Greenville, Mississippi: Three-term incumbent Errick D. Simmons is eligible for re-election.
- Greenville, North Carolina: Five-term incumbent P.J. Connelly is eligible for re-election.
- Hammond, Indiana: Six-term incumbent Thomas McDermott Jr. is eligible for re-election.
- Hartford, Connecticut: One-term incumbent Arunan Arulampalam is eligible for re-election.
- Hollywood, South Carolina: One-term incumbent Chardale Murray is eligible for re-election.
- Houston, Texas: One-term incumbent John Whitmire is eligible for re-election.
- Huntersville, North Carolina: Two-term incumbent Christy Underwood Clark is eligible for re-election.
- Jackson, Tennessee: Two-term incumbent Scott Conger is eligible for re-election.
- Jacksonville, Florida: One-term incumbent Donna Deegan is eligible for re-election.
- Jefferson City, Missouri: One-term incumbent Ron Fitzwater is eligible for re-election.
- Joliet, Illinois: One-term incumbent Terry D'Arcy is eligible for re-election.
- Juneau, Alaska: Three-term incumbent Beth Weldon is eligible for re-election.
- Keene, New Hampshire: Two-term incumbent Jay Kahn is eligible for re-election.
- Las Cruces, New Mexico: One-term incumbent Eric Enriquez is eligible for re-election.
- Liberty, Missouri: Incumbent Greg Canuteson is eligible for re-election to a third consecutive term.
- Lincoln, Nebraska: Two-term incumbent Leirion Gaylor Baird is eligible for re-election.
- Mableton, Georgia: One-term incumbent Michael Owens is eligible for re-election.
- Mackinac Island, Michigan: 51-term incumbent Margaret Doud is eligible for re-election.
- Malden, Massachusetts: Four-term incumbent Gary Christenson is eligible for re-election.
- Manchester, New Hampshire: Two-term incumbent Jay Ruais is eligible for re-election.
- Memphis, Tennessee: One-term incumbent Paul Young is eligible for re-election.
- Miami Beach, Florida: Two-term incumbent Steven Meiner is eligible for re-election.
- Miramar, Florida: Three-term incumbent Wayne Messam is eligible for re-election.
- Montgomery, Alabama: Two-term incumbent Steven Reed is eligible for re-election.
- Nashua, New Hampshire: Three-term incumbent Jim Donchess is eligible for re-election.
- Nashville, Tennessee: One-term incumbent Freddie O'Connell is eligible for re-election.
- New Bedford, Massachusetts: Six-term incumbent Jon Mitchell is eligible for re-election.
- New Britain, Connecticut: One-term incumbent Bobby Sanchez is eligible for re-election.
- New Haven, Connecticut: Four-term incumbent Justin Elicker is eligible for re-election.
- North Bergen, New Jersey: Nine-term incumbent Nicholas Sacco is eligible for re-election.
- North Charleston, South Carolina: One-term incumbent Reggie Burgess is eligible for re-election.
- Olympia, Washington: One-term incumbent Dontae Payne is eligible for re-election.
- Parma, Ohio: Four-term incumbent Timothy J. DeGeeter is eligible for re-election.
- Philadelphia, Pennsylvania: One-term incumbent Cherelle Parker is eligible for re-election.
- Portland, Maine: One-term incumbent Mark Dion is eligible for re-election.
- Prospect, Connecticut: 25-term incumbent Robert Chatfield is eligible for re-election.
- Quincy, Massachusetts: Seven-term incumbent Thomas P. Koch is eligible for re-election.
- Racine, Wisconsin: Incumbent Cory Mason is eligible for re-election to a second full term.
- Ridgefield, Connecticut: Nine-term incumbent Rudy Marconi is eligible for re-election.
- Rochester, New Hampshire: One-term incumbent Chuck Grassie is eligible for re-election.
- Salt Lake City, Utah: Two-term incumbent Erin Mendenhall is eligible for re-election.
- Sioux City, Iowa: Four-term incumbent Bob Scott is eligible for re-election.
- Somerville, Massachusetts: One-term incumbent Jake Wilson is eligible for re-election.
- South Bend, Indiana: Two-term incumbent James Mueller is eligible for re-election.
- Spokane, Washington: One-term incumbent Lisa Brown is eligible for re-election.
- Springfield, Illinois: One-term incumbent Misty Buscher is running for re-election.
- Springfield, Massachusetts: Six-term incumbent Domenic Sarno is eligible for re-election.
- Springfield, Ohio: One-term incumbent Rob Rue is eligible for re-election.
- St. Charles, Missouri: Two-term incumbent Dan Borgmeyer is eligible for re-election.
- St. Louis Park, Minnesota: One-term incumbent Nadia Mohamed is eligible for re-election.
- Taunton, Massachusetts: Four-term incumbent Shaunna O'Connell is eligible for re-election.
- Terre Haute, Indiana: One-term incumbent Brandon Sakbun is eligible for re-election.
- Troy, New York: One term incumbent Carmella R. Mantello is eligible for re-election.
- Tucson, Arizona: Two-term incumbent Regina Romero is eligible for re-election.
- Vernon, Connecticut: Seven-term incumbent Dan Champagne is eligible for re-election.
- Warren, Michigan: One-term incumbent Lori Stone is eligible for re-election.
- Wichita, Kansas: One-term incumbent Lily Wu is eligible for re-election.
- West Haven, Connecticut: Two-term incumbent Dorinda Keenan Borer is eligible for re-election.
- West Lafayette, Indiana: One-term incumbent Erin Easter is eligible for re-election.
- West New York, New Jersey: One-term incumbent Albio Sires is eligible for re-election.
- Williamsport, Pennsylvania: Two-term incumbent Derek Slaughter is eligible for re-election.
- Wilmington, North Carolina: Ten-term incumbent Bill Saffo is eligible for re-election.
- Woodbridge Township, New Jersey: Six-term incumbent John McCormac is eligible for re-election.
- Wood-Ridge, New Jersey: Seven-term incumbent Paul Sarlo is eligible for re-election.
- Worcester, Massachusetts: Eight-term incumbent Joseph Petty is eligible for re-election.
- Zion, Illinois: Two-term incumbent Billy McKinney is eligible for re-election.

==== Ineligible or retiring incumbents ====
- Cape May, New Jersey (special): Incumbent Zack Mullock is resigning after being elected to Congress.
- Charlotte, North Carolina: Incumbent Rob Harrington is not seeking a full term
- Dallas, Texas: Two-term incumbent Eric Johnson is ineligible to run for re-election due to term limits.
- Dover, Delaware: Four-term incumbent Robin Christiansen is retiring.
- Elgin, Illinois: Four-term incumbent Dave Kaptain is retiring.
- Evanston, Illinois (special): Incumbent Daniel Biss resigned before the end of his second term triggering a special election.
- Green Bay, Wisconsin: Two-term incumbent Eric Genrich is retiring.
- Greenville, South Carolina: Eight-term incumbent Knox H. White is retiring.
- Indianapolis, Indiana: Three-term incumbent Joe Hogsett is retiring.
- Kansas City, Missouri: Two-term incumbent Quinton Lucas is ineligible to run for re-election due to term limits.
- Knoxville, Tennessee: Two-term incumbent Indya Kincannon is ineligible to run for re-election due to term limits.
- Little Elm, Texas: Two-term incumbent Curtis Cornelious is ineligible to run for re-election due to term limits.
- Madison, Wisconsin: Two-term incumbent Satya Rhodes-Conway is retiring.
- Orlando, Florida: Six-term incumbent Buddy Dyer is retiring.
- Rochester Hills, Michigan: Five-term incumbent Bryan Barnett is ineligible to run for re-election due to term limits. (Note: Mayor in Rochester Hills can only appear on the ballot twice but can still run as a write-in candidate.)
- Rockford, Illinois (special): Incumbent Tom McNamara resigned before the end of his third term triggering a special election.
- Savannah, Georgia: Two-term incumbent Van R. Johnson is ineligible to run for re-election due to term limits.
- Tampa, Florida: Two-term incumbent Jane Castor is ineligible to run for re-election due to term limits.
- Yonkers, New York: Four-term incumbent Mike Spano is ineligible to run for re-election due to term limits.
