= List of mayors of the 50 largest cities in the United States =

This is a list of mayors of the 50 largest cities in the United States, ordered by their populations as of July 1, 2022, as estimated by the United States Census Bureau. These 50 cities have a combined population of 49.6 million, or 15% of the national population.

Honolulu, Indianapolis, Jacksonville, Louisville, and Nashville have consolidated city-county governments where the mayor is elected by residents of the entire county, not just that of the city proper; in these cases the population and respective rank are for the whole county.

In some jurisdictions, mayors are officially elected on a nonpartisan basis; however, the candidate's party affiliation that is known through their political history, self-declaration, or state party support is listed below.

The breakdown of mayoral political parties is 41 Democrats, 7 Republicans, and 2 Independents (one elected with state Democratic support).

== List of mayors ==

Party:
Democratic
Republican
Independent

Name	Photo	Party	City	State	Population (2025 estimate)	Rank	Start	Election(s)	Next Election	Form of government	List
Zohran Mamdani		Democratic	New York City	New York	8,584,629	1	January 1, 2026	2025	2029	Mayor–council	List
Karen Bass		Democratic (Note: De jure nonpartisan.)	Los Angeles	California	3,869,089	2	December 11, 2022	2022	2026 (defeated)	Mayor–council	List
Brandon Johnson		Democratic	Chicago	Illinois	2,731,585	3	May 15, 2023	2023	2027	Mayor–council	List
John Whitmire		Democratic	Houston	Texas	2,397,315	4	January 1, 2024	2023	2027	Mayor–council	List
Kate Gallego		Democratic	Phoenix	Arizona	1,665,481	5	March 21, 2019	2019 (special); 2020; 2024	2028	Council–manager	List
Cherelle Parker		Democratic	Philadelphia	Pennsylvania	1,603,797	6	January 2, 2024	2023	2027	Mayor–council	List
Gina Ortiz Jones		Democratic	San Antonio	Texas	1,548,422	7	June 18, 2025	2025	2029	Council–manager	List
Todd Gloria		Democratic	San Diego	California	1,406,106	8	December 10, 2020	2020; 2024	2028 (term limited)	Mayor–council	List
Eric Johnson		Republican (Note: Switched from the Democratic Party to the Republican Party in 2023.)	Dallas	Texas	1,329,491	9	June 17, 2019	2019; 2023	2027 (term limited)	Council–manager	List
Donna Deegan		Democratic	Jacksonville (Note: Consolidated city-county governments where the mayor is elected by residents of the entire county, not just that of the city proper; in these cases the population and respective rank are for the whole county.)	Florida	1,062,963	10	July 1, 2023	2023	2027	Mayor–council	List
Mattie Parker		Republican	Fort Worth	Texas	1,028,117	11	June 15, 2021	2021; 2023; 2025	2027	Council–manager	List
Kirk Watson		Democratic	Austin	Texas	1,002,632	12	January 6, 2023	2022; 2024	2028 (term limited)	Council–manager	List
Joe Hogsett		Democratic	Indianapolis	Indiana	992,196	13	January 1, 2016	2015; 2019; 2023	2027 (retiring)	Mayor–council	List
Matt Mahan		Democratic	San Jose	California	989,814	14	January 1, 2023	2022; 2024	2028	Council–manager	List
Rick Blangiardi		Independent	Honolulu	Hawaii	988,703	15	January 2, 2021	2020; 2024	2028 (term limited)	Mayor–council	List
Rob Harrington		Democratic	Charlotte	North Carolina	964,784	16	July 1, 2026	2026 (elevated)	2027 (retiring)	Council–manager	List
Andy Ginther		Democratic	Columbus	Ohio	938,396	17	January 1, 2016	2015; 2019; 2023	2027	Mayor–council	List
Daniel Lurie		Democratic	San Francisco	California	826,079	18	January 8, 2025	2024	2028	Mayor–council	List
Craig Greenberg		Democratic	Louisville	Kentucky	795,222	19	January 2, 2023	2022	2026	Mayor–council	List
Katie Wilson		Democratic	Seattle	Washington	784,777	20	January 1, 2026	2025	2029	Mayor–council	List
Freddie O'Connell		Democratic	Nashville	Tennessee	745,904	21	September 25, 2023	2023	2027	Mayor–council	List
Mike Johnston		Democratic	Denver	Colorado	740,613	22	July 17, 2023	2023	2027	Mayor–council	List
David Holt		Republican	Oklahoma City	Oklahoma	719,849	23	April 10, 2018	2018; 2022; 2026	2030	Council–manager	List
Muriel Bowser		Democratic	Washington	District of Columbia	693,645	24	January 2, 2015	2014; 2018; 2022	2026 (retiring)	Mayor–council	List
Renard Johnson		Democratic	El Paso	Texas	683,012	25	January 6, 2025	2024	2028	Council–manager	List
Shelley Berkley		Democratic	Las Vegas	Nevada	679,817	26	December 4, 2024	2024	2028	Council–manager	List
Michelle Wu		Democratic	Boston	Massachusetts	672,973	27	November 16, 2021	2021; 2025	2029	Mayor–council	List
Mary Sheffield		Democratic	Detroit	Michigan	649,095	28	January 1, 2026	2025	2029	Mayor–council	List
Keith Wilson		Democratic	Portland	Oregon	635,109	29	January 1, 2025	2024	2028	Mayor–council	List
Paul Young		Democratic	Memphis	Tennessee	609,647	30	January 1, 2024	2023	2027	Mayor–council	List
Brandon Scott		Democratic	Baltimore	Maryland	569,997	31	December 8, 2020	2020; 2024	2028 (term limited)	Mayor–council	List
Cavalier Johnson		Democratic	Milwaukee	Wisconsin	562,407	32	December 22, 2021 (Note: Acting Mayor from December 22, 2021 – April 13, 2022.)	2021 (elevated); 2022 (special); 2024	2028	Mayor–council	List
Tim Keller		Democratic	Albuquerque	New Mexico	556,588	33	December 1, 2017	2017; 2021; 2025	2029	Council–manager	List
Jerry Dyer		Republican	Fresno	California	555,549	34	January 4, 2021	2020; 2024	2028 (term limited)	Mayor–council	List
Regina Romero		Democratic	Tucson	Arizona	548,371	35	December 2, 2019	2019; 2023	2027	Council–manager	List
Kevin McCarty		Democratic	Sacramento	California	536,449	36	December 10, 2024	2024	2028	Council–manager	List
Andre Dickens		Democratic	Atlanta	Georgia	529,110	37	January 3, 2022	2021; 2025	2029	Mayor–council	List
Quinton Lucas		Democratic	Kansas City	Missouri	521,220	38	August 1, 2019	2019; 2023	2027	Council–manager	List
Mark Freeman		Republican	Mesa	Arizona	513,656	39	January 7, 2025	2024	2028	Council–manager	List
Janet Cowell		Democratic	Raleigh	North Carolina	506,306	40	December 2, 2024	2024	2026	Council–manager	List
Yemi Mobolade		Independent	Colorado Springs	Colorado	494,743	41	June 6, 2023	2023	2027	Mayor–council	List
Eileen Higgins		Democratic	Miami	Florida	489,812	42	December 18, 2025	2025	2029	Mayor–council	List
John Ewing		Democratic	Omaha	Nebraska	488,797	43	June 9, 2025	2025	2029	Mayor–council	List
Bobby Dyer		Republican	Virginia Beach	Virginia	453,737	44	November 20, 2018	2018 (special); 2020; 2024	2028	Council–manager	List
Rex Richardson		Democratic	Long Beach	California	450,469	45	December 20, 2022	2022; 2026	2030	Council–manager	List
Barbara Lee		Democratic	Oakland	California	440,838	46	May 20, 2025	2025 (special)	2026	Mayor–council	List
Jacob Frey		Democratic–Farmer–Labor	Minneapolis	Minnesota	430,324	47	January 2, 2018	2017; 2021; 2025	2029	Mayor–council	List
Karen Goh		Republican	Bakersfield	California	422,165	48	January 3, 2017	2016; 2020; 2024	2028	Council–manager	List
Monroe Nichols		Democratic	Tulsa	Oklahoma	416,209	49	December 2, 2024	2024	2028	Mayor–council	List
Jane Castor		Democratic	Tampa	Florida	413,554	50	May 1, 2019	2019; 2023	2027 (term limited)	Mayor–council	List

== See also ==
- List of longest-serving mayors in the United States
- List of United States cities by population
- Mayoralty in the United States
- United States Conference of Mayors
