= Election Day (United States) =

Day for general elections in the USA

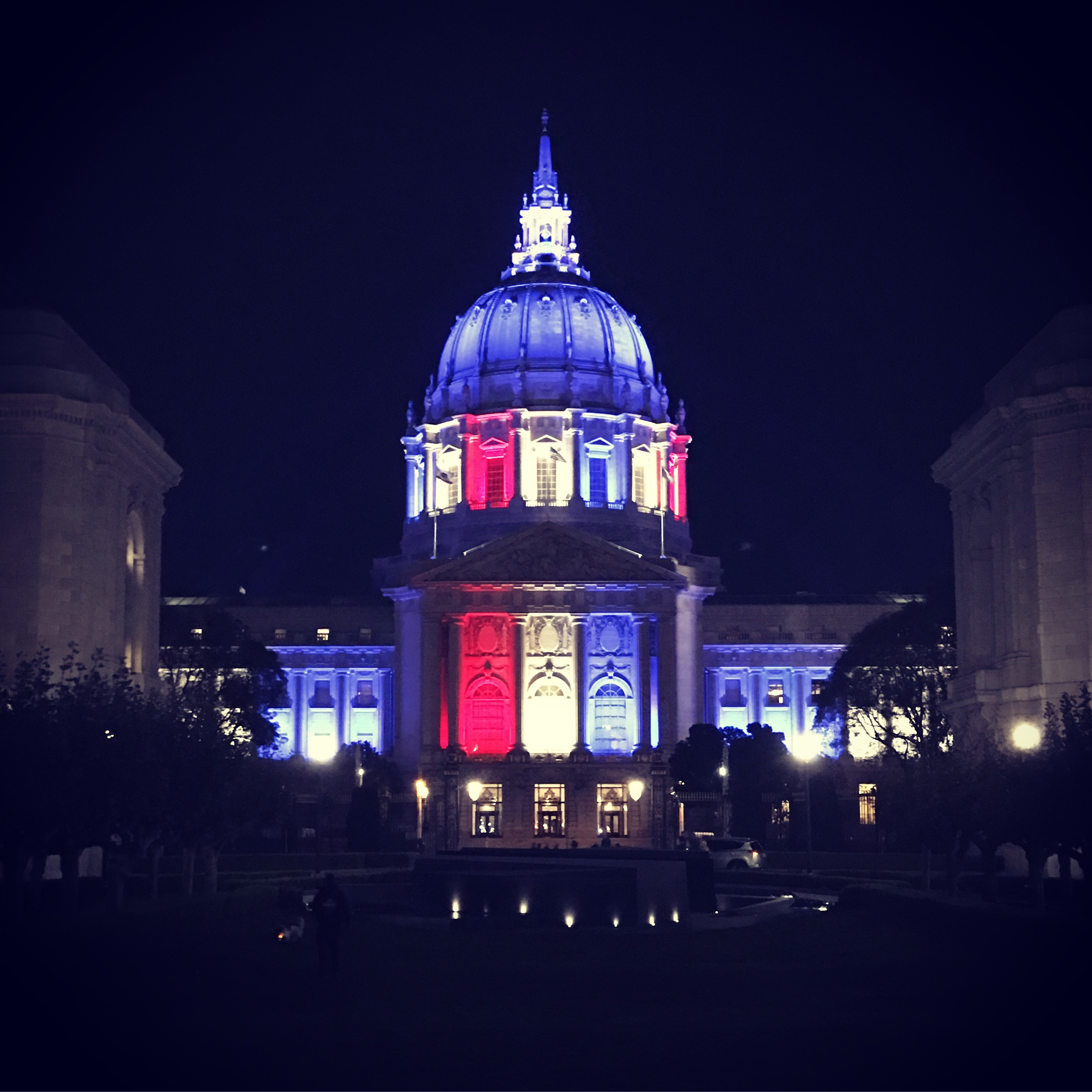
- San Francisco City Hall illuminated in special red, white, and blue LED lighting at night on November 6, 2018 to commemorate Election Day across the United States
- Type: Day for elections in the United States
- Celebrations: Exercising civic duty, voting for elected officials, visiting polling precincts, watch parties
- Date: The Tuesday after the first Monday of November
- 2025 date: November 4 (off year, details)
- 2026 date: November 3 (details)
- 2027 date: November 2 (off year, details)
- 2028 date: November 7 (details)
- Frequency: Biennial (annual if including off-years)

Election Day in the United States is the annual day for general elections of federal, state and local public officials. With respect to federal elections, it is statutorily set by the U.S. government as "the Tuesday next after the first Monday in November" of even-numbered years (i.e., the Tuesday that occurs within November 2 to November 8).

Federal offices (president, vice president, and United States Congress) and most governors (all except for Kentucky, Louisiana, Mississippi, New Jersey, and Virginia) and state legislatures are elected in even-numbered years. Presidential elections are held in years divisible by four, in which electors for president and vice president are chosen according to the method determined by each state. Elections to the U.S. House of Representatives and the U.S. Senate are held every two years. All representatives are elected to serve two-year terms. Senators serve six-year terms, staggered so that one third of senators are elected in any given general election. Elections held two years after presidential elections are referred to as midterm elections. Terms for those elected begin in January the following year. The president and vice president are inaugurated (sworn in) on Inauguration Day, which is usually January 20.

Many state and local government offices are also elected on Election Day, in addition to initiatives and referendums being voted on, as a matter of convenience and cost saving. Most governors are elected in midterm years. The five aforementioned states hold elections for state offices during odd-numbered off years. States may hold special elections for offices that have become vacant. Congress has mandated a uniform date for presidential (3 U.S.C. § 1) and congressional (2 U.S.C. § 1 and 2 U.S.C. § 7) elections, though early voting is nonetheless authorized in nearly every state, and states also have mail voting procedures.

The Empire State Building lit in blue to signify Barack Obama's win in the 2012 United States presidential election

The fact that Election Day falls on a Tuesday has become controversial in recent decades, as many people might be unable to vote because they have to work. It is a public holiday in some states, including Delaware, Hawaii, Illinois, Kentucky, Louisiana, Montana, New Jersey, New York, Virginia, West Virginia, as well as the territory of the Northern Mariana Islands and Puerto Rico. Some other states require that workers be permitted to take time off with pay. California requires that employees otherwise unable to vote must be allowed two hours off with pay, at the beginning or end of a shift. A federal holiday called Democracy Day, to coincide with Election Day, has been proposed, and some have proposed moving election day to the weekend. Other movements in the IT and automotive industries encourage employers to voluntarily give their employees paid time off on Election Day.

== History ==
By 1792, federal law permitted each state legislature to choose presidential electors any time within a 34-day period before the first Wednesday in December. A November election was convenient because the harvest would have been completed but the most severe winter weather, impeding transportation, would not yet have arrived, while the new election results also would roughly conform to a new year. Tuesday was chosen as Election Day so that voters could attend church on Sunday, travel to the polling location, usually in the county seat, on Monday, and vote before Wednesday, which was usually when farmers would sell their produce at the market. Originally, states varied considerably in the method of choosing electors. Gradually, states converged on selection by some form of popular vote.

Development of the Morse electric telegraph, funded by Congress in 1843 and successfully tested in 1844, was a technological change that clearly augured an imminent future of instant communication nationwide. To prevent information from one state from influencing Presidential electoral outcomes in another, Congress responded in 1845 by mandating a uniform national date for choosing Presidential electors. Congress chose the first Tuesday after the first Monday in November to harmonize current electoral practice with the existing 34-day window in federal law, as the span between Election Day and the first Wednesday in December is always 29 days.

The effect is to constrain Election Day to the week between November 2 and 8 inclusive. November 1 was avoided because it falls on All Saints' Day, and business owners would generally do bookkeeping for the previous month on the first day of the month. Beginning with Presidential elections, states gradually brought most elections into conformity with this date.

The Twentieth Amendment, passed in 1933, changed the beginning and end date for the terms of the President, Vice President, Congressmen, and Senators. It did not affect the timing of Election Day.

In 2022, the National Basketball Association stopped scheduling games on Election Day as a way to promote nonpartisan civic engagement and give players, fans, and coaching staff more time to vote. Their tradition of taking Election Day off remains in place today.

== Scheduling issues ==
The majority of the electorate have to attend work on Tuesdays. This has led activists to promote alternatives to increase voter turnout. Alternative solutions include making Election Day a federal holiday or merging it with Veterans Day, observed annually on November 11, allowing voting over multiple days, mandating paid time off to vote, encouraging voters to vote early or vote by postal voting, and encouraging states to promote flexible voting.

=== Holiday and paid leave ===
U.S. states and territories that have declared Election Day a holiday

Delaware, Hawaii, Illinois, Kentucky, Louisiana, Montana, New Jersey, New York, Ohio, Virginia, West Virginia, and the territory of Puerto Rico have declared Election Day a civic holiday. Some other states require that workers be permitted to take time off from employment without loss of pay. California Elections Code Section 14000 and New York State Election Law provide that employees without sufficient time to vote must be allowed two hours off with pay, at the beginning or end of a shift.

Some employers allow their employees to begin later or leave their workplace early on Election Day to allow them the opportunity to get to their precinct and vote. The United Auto Workers union has negotiated making Election Day a holiday for workers of U.S. domestic auto manufacturers. In January 2019, Sandusky, Ohio became the first city in the country to make Election Day a paid holiday for city employees by eliminating Columbus Day.

In April 2020, the Governor of Virginia Ralph Northam signed legislation that established Election Day as a holiday. In June 2020, the Governor of Illinois J. B. Pritzker signed legislation that established Election Day as a holiday.

Democratic Representative John Conyers of Michigan proposed H.R. 63 – Democracy Day Act of 2005 for the Tuesday after the first Monday in November of every even-numbered year, to be a legal public holiday called Democracy Day. The purpose of the holiday was to increase voter turnout by giving citizens more time to vote, as well as to allow for the opening of more polling stations with more workers while raising awareness of the importance of voting and civic participation. The bill was reintroduced on November 12, 2014, and again on September 25, 2018, by independent Senator Bernie Sanders. It has never been enacted.

=== Early and postal voting ===
Most states allow early voting, letting voters cast their ballots before Election Day. Early voting periods vary from 4 to 50 days prior to Election Day. Unconditional early voting in person is allowed in 32 states and in D.C. In the 2008 presidential election, 30% of votes were early votes.

All states have some kind of absentee ballot system. Unconditional absentee voting by mail is allowed in 27 states and D.C. and with an excuse in another 21 states. Unconditional permanent absentee voting is allowed in seven states and in D.C. In Colorado, Hawaii, Oregon, Utah and Washington, all major elections are by postal voting with ballot papers sent to voters several weeks before Election Day.

In 29 states, postal votes must be received on or before Election Day. Other states have later deadlines, with California election law allowing mailed in ballots to arrive at the elections office up to 17 days after Election Day. Some states, like Texas, give overseas and military voters extra time to mail in their ballots.

=== Election Day on weekends ===
Louisiana, to date, is the only U.S. state to hold de facto general elections on a Saturday. The state's statewide elections are held on odd years, with the primary (first round) in October and the runoff (general election) in November. The state's unique primary method, a variation of the nonpartisan blanket primary, only requires a further runoff to be held for those offices for which neither of the top two candidates receive an absolute majority of the vote.

From 2010-2024, primaries for U.S. House and U.S. Senate elections in Louisiana were held on the federal Election Day, with runoffs in December if necessary. Starting in 2026, Louisiana will revert to closed party primaries in Congressional elections, with the winners meeting in the general election on Election Day. Unaffiliated voters may vote in the primary of their choosing. If no candidate receives a majority in the first primary in May, a runoff between the top two finishers will be held in June.

=== Election Day involving sports leagues ===
Several sports leagues that play in November typically do not schedule games on Election Day, including the National Football League, MLB Baseball, PGA Tour, NASCAR, Professional Bull Riders, the Professional Golfers' Association of America, and the National Basketball Association. Some sports leagues that play in November schedule games regularly on Election Day, including the National Collegiate Athletic Association and the National Hockey League.

== Primaries ==
Most primary elections are held between March and September, mostly on Tuesdays. As of 2026, five states with 18% of the U.S. population held primaries in March; 26 states and D.C. with 52% of the population held primaries in May or June; and 19 states with 30% of the population held primaries between late July and September.

== See also ==
- Elections clause
- Fixed-term election – Election that occurs on a set date
- Primary election – Election that narrows the field of candidates before an election for office
- Public holidays in the United States
- Special election – Election to fill a vacant political office
- U.S. state holiday
