= 2026 Tennessee county mayoral elections =

United States local elections

- August 6, 2026

94 of 95 (Note: Davidson County holds its metropolitan mayoral election in odd-numbered years.) counties of Tennessee
	Majority party	Minority party	Third party
Party	Republican	Independent	Democratic
Seats before	58	32 (Note: In some counties, mayors may be affiliated with a political party but were elected in nonpartisan races or ran as Independents. For the purposes of the map, these officials are classified as Independents.)	5
Seats won	72	20 (Note: Includes Davidson County from 2023)	3
Seat change	▲14	▼12	▼2
- Results: Republican hold Republican gain Independent hold Independent gain Democratic hold No election

2026 Tennessee county mayoral elections were held on August 6, 2026, to determine the mayor (or county executive) of 94 of the 95 counties in the state, including several of the most populous; Shelby, Knox, Hamilton, Rutherford, Montgomery, and Williamson County. Local county primary elections were held on May 5, 2026. (Note: Madison County is used as an example for the source, but all counties follow the same dates.) The general elections for county mayor were held concurrently with primary elections for various state offices, including the gubernatorial and senatorial primaries.

Davidson County holds its metropolitan mayoral election in odd-numbered years (next scheduled for 2027).

== Hamilton County ==
2026 Hamilton County mayoral election
- August 6, 2026
- Turnout: 30.12% ▲
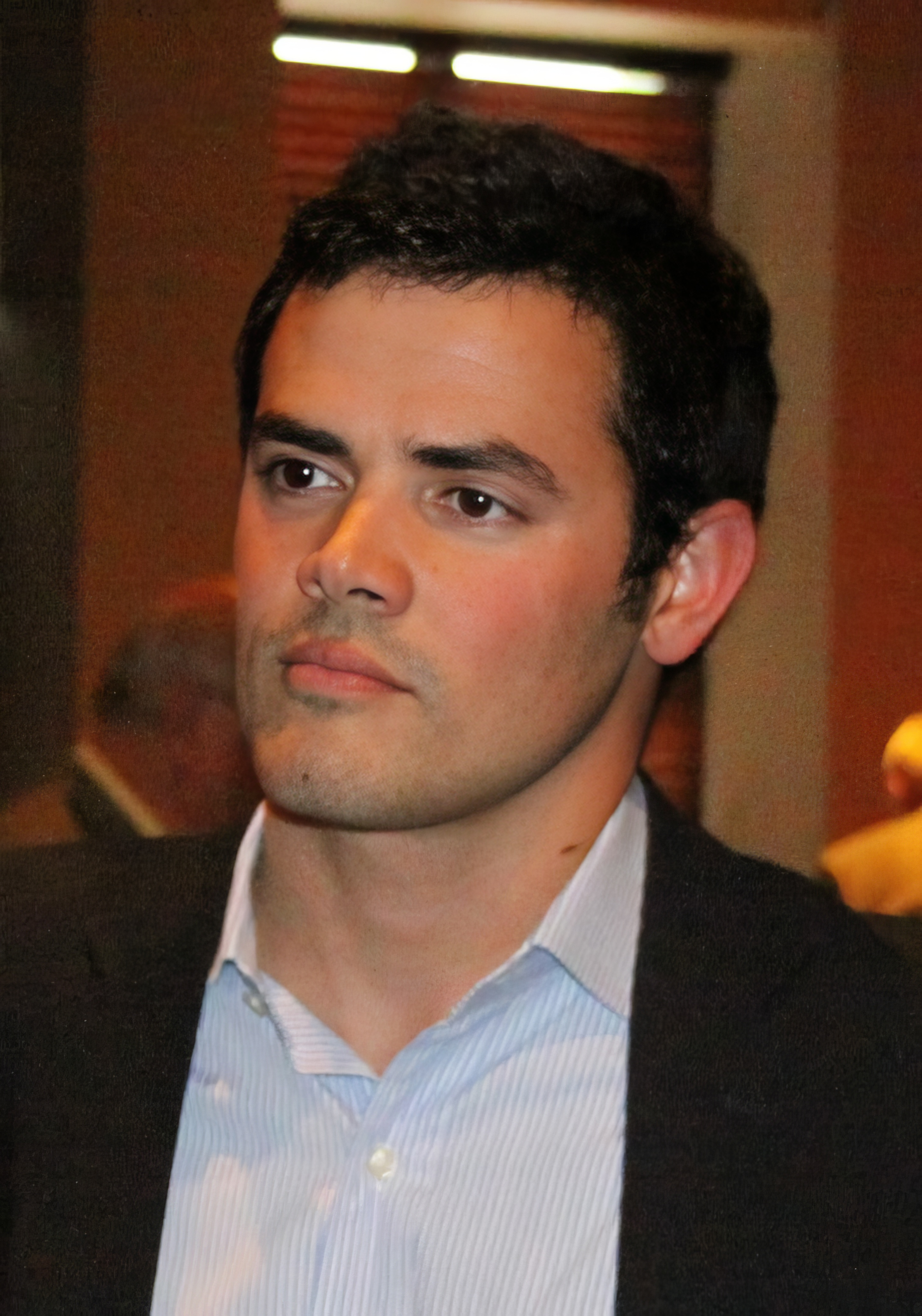

Candidate	Weston Wamp	Mark Herndon
Party	Republican	Democratic
Popular vote	33,840	30,665
Percentage	52.46%	47.54%
- Precinct results Wamp: 50–60% 60–70% 70–80% 80–90% Herndon: 50–60% 60–70% 70–80% 80–90%
Mayor before election
Weston Wamp
Republican
Elected Mayor
Weston Wamp
Republican

The 2026 Hamilton County mayoral election was held to determine the mayor of Hamilton County, Tennessee. Incumbent Republican mayor Weston Wamp, first elected in 2022, successfully won re-election with 52.5% of the vote.

=== Results ===
Results
Party	Candidate	Votes	%
Republican	Weston Wamp	33,840	52.46%
Democratic	Mark Herndon	30,665	47.54%
Total votes		64,505	100.00%

== Knox County ==
2026 Knox County mayoral election
- August 6, 2026
Candidate	Betsy Henderson	Beau Hawk
Party	Republican	Democratic
Popular vote	46,207	41,853
Percentage	52.47%	47.53%
Mayor before election
Glenn Jacobs
Republican
Elected Mayor
Betsy Henderson
Republican

The 2026 Knox County mayoral election was held to determine the mayor of Knox County, Tennessee. Incumbent Republican mayor Glenn Jacobs, first elected in 2018, is term-limited and cannot seek a third term.

Republican Betsy Henderson won the general election with 52.5% of the vote.

=== Results ===
Results
Party	Candidate	Votes	%
Republican	Betsy Henderson	46,207	52.47%
Democratic	Beau Hawk	41,853	47.53%
Total votes		88,060	100.00%

== Montgomery County ==
2026 Montgomery County mayoral election
- August 6, 2026
Nominee	Wes Golden	Isaac Greenwood	Christine McNemar
Party	Republican	Democratic	Independent
Popular vote	14,208	7,689	2,519
Percentage	58.08%	31.43%	10.30%
Mayor before election
Wes Golden
Republican
Elected mayor
Wes Golden
Republican

The 2026 Montgomery County mayoral election was held to determine the mayor of Montgomery County, Tennessee. Incumbent Republican mayor Wes Golden, first elected in 2022, comfortably won re-election to a second term with 58.1% of the vote.

=== Republican primary ===
- Wes Golden, incumbent mayor

=== Democratic primary ===
- Isaac Greenwood

=== Independents ===
- Christine Marie McNemar

=== Results ===
Results
Party	Candidate	Votes	%
Republican	Wes Golden (incumbent)	14,208	58.08%
Democratic	Isaac Greenwood	7,689	31.43%
Independent	Christine McNemar	2,519	10.30%
Write-ins		47	0.19%
Total votes		24,463	100.00%

== Rutherford County ==
2026 Rutherford County mayoral election
- August 6, 2026
Nominee	Randy Allen
Party	Republican
Popular vote	29,334
Percentage	96.04%
Mayor before election
Joe Carr
Republican
Elected mayor
Randy Allen
Republican

The 2026 Rutherford County mayoral election was held to determine the mayor of Rutherford County, Tennessee. Incumbent Republican mayor Joe Carr, first elected in 2022, ran for re-election, but lost the Republican primary to Randy Allen. Allen became assumed mayor elect because he ran unopposed in the August general election.

=== Republican primary ===
==== Nominated ====
- Randy Allen, 2022 runner up for Mayor of Rutherford County

==== Eliminated in primary ====
- Joe Carr, incumbent mayor
- Craig Harris, county commissioner

Republican primary results
Party	Candidate	Votes	%
Republican	Randy Allen	6,844	36.24%
Republican	Joe Carr (incumbent)	6,459	34.20%
Republican	Craig Harris	5,584	29.57%
Total votes		18,887	100.00%

=== Results ===
Results
Party	Candidate	Votes	%
Republican	Randy Allen	29,334	96.04%
Write-ins		1,208	3.96%
Total votes		30,542	100.00%

== Shelby County ==
2026 Shelby County mayoral election
- August 6, 2026

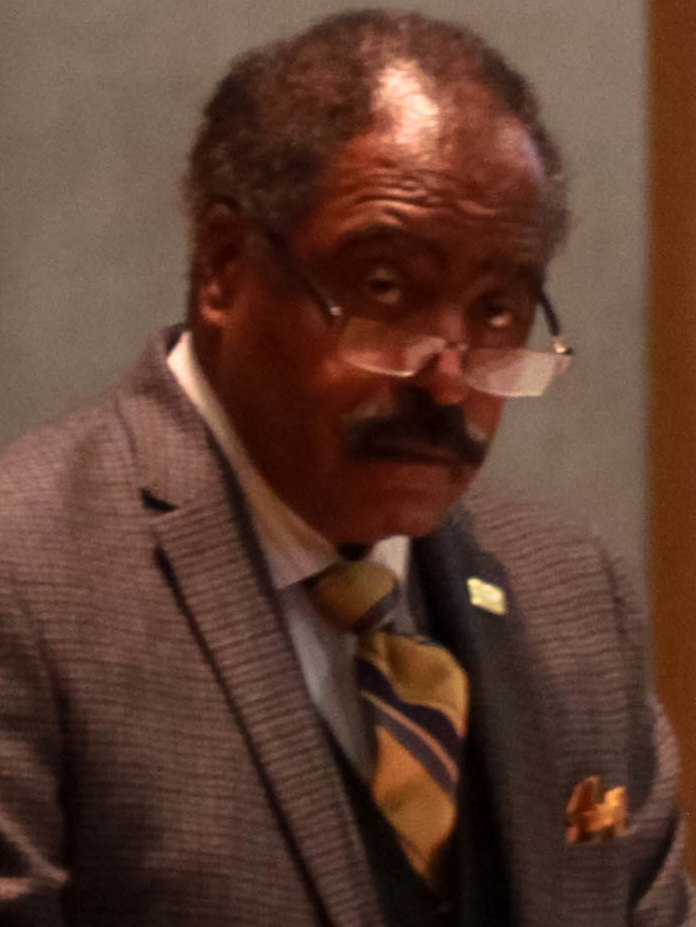
Nominee	Mickell Lowery	John DeBerry
Party	Democratic	Republican
Popular vote	84,250	43,487
Percentage	65.96%	34.04%
Mayor before election
Lee Harris
Democratic
Elected mayor
Mickell Lowery
Democratic

The 2026 Shelby County mayoral election was held to determine the mayor of Shelby County, Tennessee. Incumbent Democratic mayor Lee Harris, first elected in 2018, is term-limited and can not seek a third term.

Democratic candidate Mickell Lowery won the general election with 66.0% of the vote.

=== Results ===
Results
Party	Candidate	Votes	%
Democratic	Mickell Lowery	84,250	65.96%
Republican	John DeBerry	43,487	34.04%
Total votes		127,737	100.00%

== Williamson County ==
2026 Williamson County mayoral election
- August 6, 2026
Nominee	Andy Marshall	B.K. Muvvala
Party	Republican	Independent
Popular vote	30,471	12,707
Percentage	70.57%	29.43%
Mayor before election
Rogers C. Anderson
Republican
Elected mayor
Andy Marshall
Republican

The 2026 Williamson County mayoral election was held to determine the mayor of Williamson County, Tennessee. Incumbent Republican mayor Rogers C. Anderson, first elected in 2002, did not run for re-election.

Republican Andy Marshall won the general election.

=== Republican primary ===
==== Nominated ====
- Andy Marshall, restaurant owner

==== Eliminated ====
- Mary Smith, county commissioner

==== Withdrawn ====
- Brandon Ogles, former state representative from the 61st district (2019–2023) and cousin of U.S. Representative Andy Ogles

Republican primary results
Party	Candidate	Votes	%
Republican	Andy Marshall	12,864	54.33%
Republican	Mary Smith	10,787	45.56%
Write-ins		28	0.12%
Total votes		23,679	100.00%

=== Independent candidates ===
- BK Muvvala

=== Results ===
Results
Party	Candidate	Votes	%
Republican	Andy Marshall	30,471	70.57%
Independent	B.K. Muvvala	12,707	29.43%
Total votes		43,178	100.00%

== Other counties (A–W) ==
The following 89 counties also held mayoral elections on August 6, 2026.

Summary of 2026 Tennessee county mayoral elections
County	Incumbent			Primaries (May 5, 2026)	General election (Aug 6, 2026)
Anderson	Terry Frank	Republican	Incumbent re-elected.	▌Terry Frank (Republican)* 56.02%; ▌Joshua Anderson (Republican) 43.98%	▌ ✓ Terry Frank (Republican) 100%
Bedford	Chad Graham	Republican	Incumbent retired. Independent gain.	▌Chad Fletcher (Republican) 53.00%; ▌Ally Puckett (Republican) 32.48%; ▌James Sloan (Republican) 12.40%	▌ ✓ Curt Cobb (Independent) 44.20%; ▌Chad Fletcher (Republican) 24.50%; ▌Troy Thompson (Independent) 23.66%; ▌Misty Pellar (Independent) 3.36%; ▌Adam Vanderkin (Independent) 2.55%; ▌Jordan Malone (Independent) 1.74%
Benton	Mark Ward	Republican	Incumbent re-elected.	▌Mark Ward (Republican)	▌ ✓ Mark Ward (Republican) 46.16%; ▌Scott Phifer (Independent) 36.56%; ▌Norman Frazier (Independent) 13.43%; ▌Shasta Arnold (Independent) 3.85%
Bledsoe	Gregg Ridley	Republican	Republican hold.	▌Kris Fradly (Republican)	▌ ✓ Kris Frady (Republican) 100%
Blount	Ed Mitchell	Republican	Republican hold.	▌Jared Anderson (Republican)	▌ ✓ Jared Anderson (Republican) 74.47%; ▌Brian Thomson (Democratic) 25.53%
Bradley	D. Gary Davis	Republican	Incumbent re-elected.	▌D. Gary Davis (Republican); ▌Bradley Griffith (Republican)	▌ ✓ D. Gary Davis (Republican) 71.84%; ▌Stoney Matthews (Independent) 28.16%
Campbell	Jack Lynch	Independent	Incumbent lost re-election. Republican gain.	▌E.L Morton (Republican); ▌Laura Ann Ayers (Republican); ▌James A. Gross (Republican); ▌Jimmy Jeffries (Republican)	▌ ✓ Jimmy Jeffries (Republican) 50.37%; ▌Jack Lynch (Independent) 49.63%
Cannon	Greg Mitchell	Independent	Incumbent re-elected.	▌Jim Bush (Republican)	▌ ✓ Greg Mitchell (Independent) 99.26%; ▌Write-in 0.74%
Carroll	Joseph Butler	Republican	Incumbent re-elected.	▌Joseph Butler (Republican)	▌ ✓ Joseph Butler (Republican) 100%
Carter	Patty Woodby	Republican	Incumbent re-elected.	▌ Patty Woodby (Republican)* 36.34%; ▌Danny Deal (Republican) 32.89%; ▌John Holsclaw (Republican) 30.77%	▌ ✓ Patty Woodby (Republican) 44.18%; ▌H. Little (Independent) 41.42%; ▌Jeff Williams (Independent) 10.03%; ▌Sue Chambers-Ford (Independent) 4.37%
Cheatham	Kerry McCarver	Republican	Incumbent lost renomination. Republican hold.	▌Bill Anderson (Republican) 55.53%; ▌Kerry McCarver (Republican)*; 44.47%	▌ ✓ Bill Anderson (Republican) 100%
Chester	Barry Hutcherson	Republican	Incumbent re-elected.	▌ ✓ Barry Hutcherson (Republican)	▌ ✓ Barry Hutcherson (Republican) 100%
Claiborne	Joe Brooks	Independent	Incumbent posthumously re-elected. Special election to be held Nov. 3.	N/A	▌ ✓ Joe Brooks † (Independent) 52.37%; ▌Jack Daniels (Independent) 37.58%; ▌Joe Johnson (Independent) 10.05%
Clay	Dale Reagan	Independent	Incumbent lost re-election. Independent hold.	N/A	▌ ✓ Greg Brannon (Independent) 34.54%; ▌Dale Reagan (Independent) 26.33%; ▌Neal Smith (Independent) 17.70%; ▌Ronnie Smith (Independent) 16.73%; ▌Adam Bryant (Independent) 4.70%
Cocke	Rob Mathis	Republican	Republican hold.		▌ ✓ Joe Shults (Republican) 57.37%; ▌Chad Burchette (Independent) 42.63%
Coffee	Dennis Hunt	Republican	Incumbent re-elected.	▌Dennis Hunt (Republican); ▌Cheryl Swan (Republican); ▌Daniel Berry (Republican); ▌Khamai Rozier (Democratic)	▌ ✓ Dennis Hunt (Republican) 70.01%; ▌Mark Messick (Independent) 17.26%; ▌Khamai Rozier (Democratic) 12.73%
Crockett	Gary Reasons	Independent	Republican gain.		▌ ✓ Joe Gibson (Republican) 74.32%; ▌Eric King (Independent) 19.91%; ▌Brad York (Independent) 5.77%
Cumberland	Allen Foster	Republican	Incumbent re-elected.	▌Allen Foster (Republican)	▌ ✓ Allen Foster (Republican) 100%
Decatur	Hunter Miller	Republican	Republican hold.		▌ ✓ Mike Creasy (Republican) 57.34%; ▌Dennis McKenzie (Independent) 42.66%
DeKalb	Matt Adcock	Republican	Incumbent retiring. Republican hold.	▌Patrick R. Ray (Republican); ▌Beth Pafford (Democratic)	▌ ✓ Patrick R. Ray (Republican) 54.57%; ▌Brandon Bates (Independent) 29.50%; ▌Beth Pafford (Democratic) 15.67%; ▌Write-in 0.26%
Dickson	Bob Rial	Independent	Republican gain.		▌ ✓ Danny W. Williams (Republican) 63.83%; ▌Ben Shepard (Independent) 25.14%; ▌Caleb M. Wray (Independent) 5.95%; ▌Reggie Weaver (Independent) 3.81%; ▌Ray Ledger (Independent) 1.20%
Dyer	David Quick	Independent	Republican gain.		▌ ✓ Eric Maupin (Republican) 71.04%; ▌Jerry Brock (Independent) 28.96%
Fayette	Rhea Taylor	Republican	Incumbent re-elected.		▌ ✓ Rhea Taylor (Republican) 67.40%; ▌Brandon Echols (Independent) 32.60%
Fentress	Jimmy Johnson	Independent	Republican gain.		▌ ✓ Jason Rosenbaum (Republican)
Franklin	Chris Ruffner	Republican	Incumbent re-elected.		▌ ✓ Chris Guess (Republican) 98.78%; ▌Write-in 1.22%
Gibson	Tom Witherspoon	Republican	Republican hold.		▌ ✓ Jack Cunningham (Republican) 100%
Giles	Graham Stowe	Republican	Independent gain.	▌David Wamble (Republican)	▌ ✓ Knox Vanderpool (Independent) 34.66%; ▌Terry Jones (Independent) 34.54%; ▌David Wamble (Republican) 30.80%
Grainger	Chris G. King	Republican	Republican hold.		▌ ✓ Mike Byrd (Republican) 100%
Greene	Kevin Morrison	Republican	Incumbent re-elected.		▌ ✓ Kevin Morrison (Republican) 100%
Grundy	Michael Brady	Republican	Incumbent re-elected.		▌ ✓ Michael Brady (Republican) 65.52%; ▌Jason Peterson (Independent) 34.48%
Hamblen	Bill Brittain	Republican	Republican hold.		▌ ✓ Chris Cutshaw (Republican) 100%
Hancock	Thomas Harrison	Republican	Republican hold.		▌ ✓ Greg Marion (Republican) 66.99%; ▌Sage Trent (Independent) 33.01%
Hardeman	Todd Pulse	Democratic	Incumbent re-elected.		▌ ✓ Todd Pulse (Democratic) 66.22%; ▌Brad Grantham (Republican) 27.71%; ▌Chris Cox (Independent) 6.07%
Hardin	Kevin Davis	Republican	Incumbent re-elected.		▌ ✓ Kevin Davis (Republican) 100%
Hawkins	Mark DeWitte	Republican	Republican hold.		▌ ✓ David Linkous (Republican) 100%
Haywood	David Livingston	Independent	Independent hold.	N/A	▌ ✓ Jeffery Richmond (Independent) 46.62%; ▌Jim Duke (Independent) 46.49%; ▌Greg Vanstory (Independent) 6.90%
Henderson	Eddie Bray	Republican	Republican hold.		▌ ✓ Robbie McCready (Republican) 53.57%; ▌Blake Mitchell (Independent) 46.43%
Henry	John Penn Ridgeway	Republican	Independent gain.		▌ ✓ Jonathan Lodge (Independent) 53.18%; ▌David Webb (Republican) 46.82%
Hickman	Jim Bates	Republican	Incumbent lost renomination. Republican hold.	▌Jim Bates (Republican); ▌Christ Chilton (Republican); ▌Mark Dewayne Qualls (Republican); ▌Zachary Bentley (Republican)	▌ ✓ Chris Chilton (Republican) 45.77%; ▌Robert Atkinson (Independent) 24.61%; ▌Mark Qualls (Independent) 23.23%; ▌Terri Christie (Independent) 6.40%
Houston	James Bridges	Independent	Republican gain.		▌ ✓ Joey Blake (Republican)
Humphreys	Jessie Wallace	Independent	Incumbent retired. Independent hold.	▌Charles Niman (Republican)	▌ ✓ Daniel Waggoner (Independent) 65.87%; ▌Michael Pogreba (Independent) 21.01%; ▌Charles Niman (Republican) 13.12%
Jackson	Jim Morgan	Independent	Incumbent lost re-election. Republican gain.		▌ ✓ Brian Lee (Republican) 77.85%; ▌Jim Morgan (Independent) 11.09%; ▌Aurora Wells (Democratic) 11.06%
Jefferson	Mark Potts	Republican	Republican hold.	▌Mark Potts (Republican)	▌ ✓ Randy Bales (Republican) 82.31%; ▌Carl Eggers (Independent) 17.69%
Johnson	Larry Potter	Independent	Incumbent re-elected. Republican gain.	▌ Larry Potter (Republican)* 59.20%; ▌Dayton “Tim” Payne (Republican) 40.80%	▌ ✓ Larry Potter (Republican)
Lake	Danny Cook	Independent	Incumbent lost re-election. Independent hold.		▌ ✓ Tony Bargery (Independent) 56.25%; ▌Danny Cook (Independent) 43.75%
Lauderdale	Maurice Gaines	Independent	Incumbent lost re-election. Republican gain.		▌ ✓ Ronnie Jackson (Republican) 53.91%; ▌Maurice Gaines (Independent) 45.97%; ▌Write-in 0.12%
Lawrence	David Morgan	Republican	Incumbent re-elected.		▌ ✓ David Morgan (Republican) 61.79%; ▌Shane Eaton (Independent) 37.81%
Lewis	Jonah Keltner	Independent	Incumbent lost renomination. Republican gain.		▌ ✓ James Skelton (Republican) 67.63%; ▌Shane Blackwood (Independent) 32.37%
Lincoln	Bill Newman	Independent	Incumbent retired. Independent hold.	N/A	▌ ✓ Walt Patrick (Independent) 35.66%; ▌Daniel Eldridge (Independent) 32.48%; ▌Troy Frassrand (Independent) 16.84%; ▌Glen T. Douglas (Independent) 14.83%; ▌Write-in 0.19%
Loudon	Buddy Bradshaw	Republican	Incumbent re-elected.		▌ ✓ Rollen Bradshaw (Republican) 74.96%; ▌Maureen Colvin (Independent) 25.04%
McMinn	John Gentry	Republican	Incumbent re-elected.		▌ ✓ John M. Gentry (Republican)
McNairy	Larry Smith	Republican	Incumbent retired. Independent gain.		▌ ✓ Anthony Knight (Independent) 53.2%; ▌Kim Bienash (Republican) 42.9%; ▌Jeffrey B. Maxedon (Independent) 2.2%; ▌Dylan Michael (Independent) 1.8%
Macon	Steve Jones	Republican	Incumbent lost renomination. Republican hold.		▌ ✓ Rick Shoulders (Republican) 57.77%; ▌Michael Underwood (Independent) 33.68%; ▌Phillip R. Spears Jr. (Independent) 8.47%; ▌Write-in 0.08%
Madison	A.J. Massey	Republican	Incumbent re-elected.		▌ ✓ AJ Massey (Republican) 62.05%; ▌Fren'Cherry R. Miller (Independent) 37.73%
Marion	David Jackson	Democratic	Incumbent re-elected.	▌Travis Layne (Republican) 43.18%; ▌Tom D. Hudson (Republican) 34.88%; ▌Larry N. Montague (Republican) 21.95%; ▌Khamai Rozier (Democratic) 100.00%	▌ ✓ David Jackson (Democratic) 35.73%; ▌Travis Layne (Republican) 35.18%; ▌Others (Independent) 29.09%
Marshall	Mike Keny	Independent	Incumbent retired. Republican gain		▌ ✓ Craig Blackwell (Republican) 36.41%; ▌Frank Sullivan (Independent) 34.43%; ▌Keith Hollingsworth (Independent) 28.83%; ▌Write-in 0.33%
Maury	Sheila Butt	Independent	Incumbent re-elected. Republican gain.	▌Sheila Butt (Republican)	▌ ✓ Sheila Butt (Republican) 56.19%; ▌Gabe Howard (Independent) 43.81%
Meigs	Eddie Jewell	Democratic	Incumbent lost re-election Republican gain.		▌ ✓ Joe Lawson (Republican) 62.64%; ▌Edgar A. Jewell, Jr (Democratic) 37.06%
Monroe	Mitch Ingram	Republican	Incumbent re-elected.		▌ ✓ Mitch Ingram (Republican) 100%
Moore	Sloan Stewart	Independent	Incumbent re-elected.	N/A	▌ ✓ Sloan Stewart (Independent) 62.17%; ▌Keith Moses (Independent) 37.83%
Morgan	Brian Langley	Independent	Incumbent re-elected.	N/A	▌ ✓ Brian Langley (Independent)
Obion	Steve Carr	Republican	Incumbent re-elected.		▌ ✓ Steve Carr (Republican)
Overton	Benny Dziadak	Republican	Incumbent retired. Republican hold.		▌ ✓ Benny Dziadak (Republican)
Perry	John Carroll	Independent	Incumbent re-elected.		▌ ✓ John Carroll (Independent) 64.96%; ▌Don Bates (Independent) 24.18%; ▌Christian Singleton (Independent) 5.85%; ▌Johnny Skelton (Democratic) 4.82%; ▌Write-in 0.20%
Pickett	Stephen Bilbrey	Democratic	Incumbent re-elected. Independent gain.	N/A	▌ ✓ Stephen Bilbrey (Independent) 100%
Polk	Rob Herbree	Republican	Incumbent retired. Republican hold.		▌ ✓ Rob Herbree (Republican)
Putnam	Randy Porter	Republican	Incumbent re-elected.	▌Randy Porter (Republican)* 86.06%; ▌Wayne Nabors (Republican) 13.94%; ▌Ryan Dalton (Democratic)	▌ ✓ Randy Porter (Republican) 77.80%; ▌Ryan Dalton (Democratic) 22.20%
Rhea	Jim Vincent	Independent	Incumbent retired. Independent hold.	N/A	▌ ✓ Jim Vincent (Independent)
Roane	Wade Creswell	Republican	Incumbent re-elected. Republican gain.		▌ ✓ Wade Creswell (Republican)
Robertson	Billy Vogle	Independent	Incumbent retired. Republican gain.	▌ Keith Hoover (Republican) 49.42%; ▌John Edwards (Republican) 38.08%; ▌Bubba Dorris (Republican) 12.43%; ▌Write-ins (Republican) 0.07%	▌ ✓ Keith Hoover (Republican) 97.59%
Scott	Jerried Jeffers	Independent	Incumbent lost re-election. Republican gain.		▌ ✓ Dennis Jeffers (Republican) 56.18%; ▌David R. Jeffers (Independent) 24.39%; ▌Jennifer Shockley (Independent) 15.33%; ▌Trent Cross (Independent) 4.10%
Sequatchie	Keith Cartwright	Republican	Incumbent re-elected.		▌ ✓ Keith Cartwright (Republican)
Sevier	Larry Waters	Republican	Incumbent retired. Republican hold.	▌Bryan McCarter (Republican) 71.70%; ▌Jerry Grubb (Republican) 28.30%	▌ ✓ Bryan McCarter (Republican) 74.08%; ▌Mark Francesco Mundo (Independent) 12.99%; ▌Krystal Lee Whaley (Independent) 12.92%
Smith	Jeff Mason	Republican	Incumbent re-elected.		▌ ✓ Jeff Mason (Republican) 78.84%; ▌Jennifer Shockley (Independent) 20.49%; ▌Write-in 0.66%
Stewart	Robert Beecham	Independent	Incumbent re-elected.	N/A	▌ ✓ Robert Beecham (Independent) 63.04%; ▌Christopher Hartigan (Independent) 15.78%; ▌David Ross (Independent) 15.65%; ▌Scott Shepperd (Independent) 5.27%; ▌Write-in 0.35%
Sullivan	Richard Venable	Republican	Incumbent re-elected.	▌Richard Vanover (Republican)* 60.34%; ▌Angie Stanley (Republican) 39.66%	▌ ✓ Richard Vanover (Republican)
Sumner	John Isbell	Republican	Incumbent re-elected.	▌John Isbell (Republican)	▌ ✓ John Isbell (Republican) 96.78%
Tipton	Jeff Huffman	Republican	Incumbent retired. Republican hold.	▌William “Billy” Daugherty (Republican)	▌ ✓ William “Billy” Daugherty (Republican)
Trousdale	Jack McCall	Independent	Incumbent re-elected.	N/A	▌ ✓ Jack McCall (Independent) 49.00%; ▌Brian Crook (Independent) 30.43%; ▌Betty J. Burch (Independent) 20.17%; ▌Write-in 0.40%
Unicoi	Garland Evely	Republican	Incumbent re-elected.	▌Garland Evely (Republican)	▌ ✓ Garland Evely (Republican)
Union	Jason Bailey	Independent	Incumbent re-elected.	N/A	▌ ✓ Jason Bailey (Independent)
Van Buren	David Sullivan	Independent	Incumbent lost re-election. Republican gain.		▌ ✓ Barry Austin (Republican) 61.42%; ▌Cale Crain (Independent) 35.00%; ▌Write-in 3.58%
Warren	Terry Bell	Republican	Incumbent re-elected.	▌Terry Bell (Republican); ▌J.C. Petit (Democratic)	▌ ✓ Terry Bell (Republican) 68.92%; ▌J.C. Petit (Independent) 22.83%; ▌James Ferrell (Independent) 5.05%; ▌Jason McEwen (Independent) 3.19%
Washington	Joe Grandy	Republican	Incumbent re-elected.	▌Joe Grandy (Republican)	▌ ✓ Joe Grandy (Republican) 50.86%; ▌James Reeves (Independent) 49.14%
Wayne	Jim Mangubat	Independent	Incumbent lost re-election. Republican gain.	▌ John Mcdonald (Republican) 36.5%; ▌Colby Staggs (Republican) 28.9%; ▌Jim Mangubat (Republican)* 19.9%; ▌Phillip Casteel (Republican) 14.5%	▌ ✓ John McDonald (Republican)
Weakley	Jake Bynum	Independent	Incumbent retired. Republican gain.	▌Dale Hutcherson (Republican)	▌ ✓ Dale Hutcherson (Republican)
White	Denny Wayne Robinson	Republican	Incumbent lost renomination. Republican hold.	▌Kyle Goff (Republican) 73.36%; ▌Denny Wayne Robinson (Republican)*; 26.64%	▌ ✓ Kyle Goff (Republican) 77.56%; ▌Joe Hallums (Independent) 18.08%; ▌Penny Whaley (Independent) 4.36%
Wilson	Randall Hutto	Republican	Incumbent re-elected.	▌Randall Hutto (Republican); ▌Christina Puza-Smith (Democratic)	▌ ✓ Randall Hutto (Republican) 66.40%; ▌Christina Puza-Smith (Democratic) 24.83%; ▌Gayle Hellemn (Independent) 8.77%

== See also ==
- Government of Tennessee
- 2026 Tennessee elections
- 2026 United States local elections
- 2027 Nashville mayoral election
