= 2022 Long Beach, California, mayoral election =

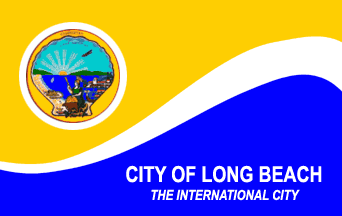
- June 7, 2022 (first round); November 8, 2022 (runoff)
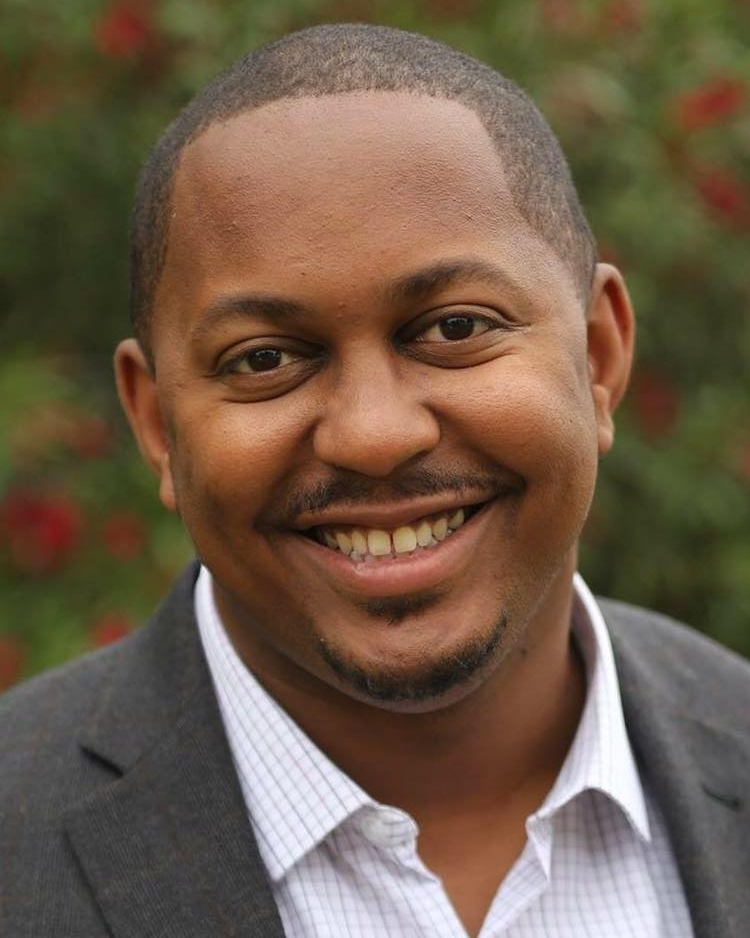

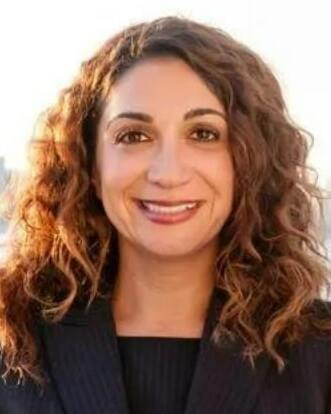
Candidate	Rex Richardson	Suzie Price
First round	33,791; 44.1%	28,331; 36.7%
Runoff	62,751; 56.61%	48,098; 43.39%
Candidate	Joshua Rodriguez	Raul Cedillo
First round	6,286; 8.2%	4,563; 6.0%
Runoff	Eliminated	Eliminated
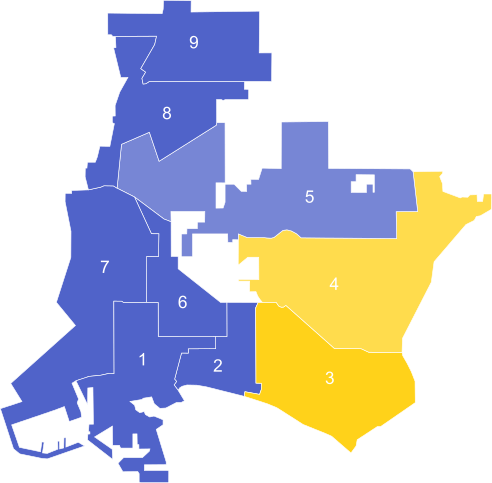
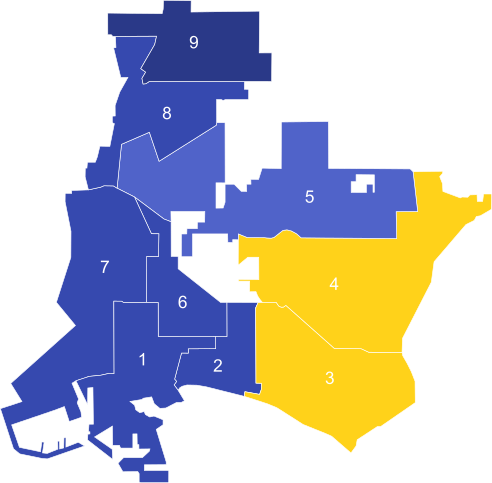
- Richardson: 40–50% 50–60% Price: 40–50% 50–60% Richardson: 50–60% 60–70% 70–80% Price: 50–60%
Mayor before election
Robert Garcia
Elected mayor
Rex Richardson

The 2022 Long Beach mayoral election was held on June 7, 2022. Because no candidate reached 50% of the vote, there was a runoff election on November 8, 2022. Although incumbent Mayor Robert Garcia was eligible to run for a third term, he opted to run for the U.S. House instead (and won that seat). Rex Richardson was elected mayor, defeating Suzie Price.

== Candidates ==
- Melanie Becerril (write-in)
- Raul Cedillo, substitute teacher
- Deborah Mozer, commercial finance professional
- Suzie Price, Long Beach City Councilwoman
- Rex Richardson, Long Beach City Councilman and vice mayor
- Joshua Rodriguez, police officer
- Franklin Sims

== Endorsements ==
Suzie Price

Statewide politicians

- Betty Yee, California State Controller

State legislators

- Patrick O'Donnell, state assemblyman
- Tom Umberg, state senator

Organizations

- American Federation of State, County, and Municipal Employees
- International Brotherhood of Electrical Workers
- Long Beach Chamber of Commerce
- Long Beach Police Officers Association
- Press-Telegram
- Public Affairs Alliance of Iranian Americans
Rex Richardson

Federal politicians

- Alex Padilla, U.S. Senator from California

Statewide politicians

- Gavin Newsom, Governor of California

Local politicians

- Robert Garcia, incumbent mayor of Long Beach
- Janice Hahn, Los Angeles County Supervisor and former U.S. Representative
- Holly Mitchell, Los Angeles County Supervisor and former state senator

Organizations

- California Democratic Party
- Long Beach Fire Department
- Los Angeles County Federation of Labor
- Planned Parenthood
- Run for Something
- Sierra Club Los Angeles
- Working Families Party

== Results ==
=== First round ===
Results
Candidate	Votes	%
Rex Richardson	33,791	44.11%
Suzie Price	28,331	36.98%
Joshua Rodriguez	6,286	8.21%
Raul Cedillo	4,563	5.96%
Franklin Sims	2,121	2.77%
Deborah Mozer	1,511	1.97%
Total votes	76,603	100%

=== Runoff ===
Results
Candidate	Votes	%
Rex Richardson	62,751	56.61%
Suzie Price	48,098	43.39%
Total votes	110,849	100.00%
