= Fayetteville, Georgia =

- City
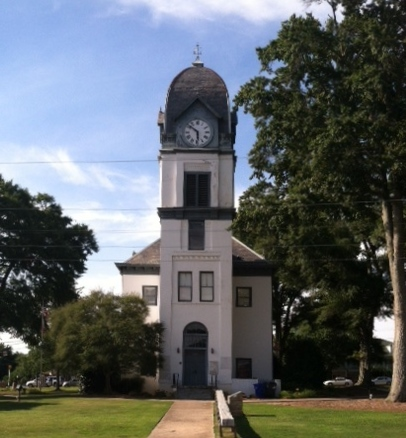
- Fayette County Courthouse

- Seal Logo
- Motto: "No limits on imagination"
- Interactive map of Fayetteville, Georgia
- Coordinates: 33°26′52″N 84°27′42″W
- Country: United States
- State: Georgia
- County: Fayette
- Established: March 28, 1822
- Incorporated (town): 1823
- Incorporated (city): 1888

Government
  - Type: Council/Manager
  - Mayor: Edward J Johnson Jr
  - City Manager: Ray Gibson

Area
  - Total: 13.18 sq mi (34.14 km^{2})
  - Land: 12.97 sq mi (33.58 km^{2})
  - Water: 0.22 sq mi (0.56 km^{2})
- Elevation: 1,030 ft (313.9 m)

Population (2020)
  - Total: 18,957
  - Density: 1,462/sq mi (564.6/km^{2})
- Time zone: UTC-5 (Eastern (EST))
  - Summer (DST): UTC-4 (EDT)
- ZIP codes: 30214-30215
- Area codes: 770 470, 678
- FIPS code: 13-28968
- GNIS feature ID: 0314089
- Website: fayetteville-ga.gov

Fayetteville (/ˈfeɪ.ət.vɪl/ FAY-ət-vil; locally /ˈfeɪ.ət.vəl/ FAY-ət-vəl) is a city in and the county seat of Fayette County, Georgia, United States. As of the 2020 census, the city had a population of 18,957, up from 15,945 at the 2010 census. Fayetteville is located 22 miles (35 km) south of downtown Atlanta.

== History ==
Fayetteville was founded in 1822 as the seat of the newly formed Fayette County, organized by European Americans from territory ceded by force from the Creek people under a treaty with the United States during the early period of Indian removal from the Southeast. Both city and county were named in honor of the Revolutionary War hero the French Marquis de Lafayette. Fayetteville was incorporated as a town in 1823 and as a city in 1902.

The area was developed for cotton plantations, with labor provided by enslaved Black Americans, who for more than a century comprised the majority of the county's population. Fayetteville became the trading town for the agricultural area.

In the first half of the 20th century, as agriculture became more mechanized, many Black American workers left the area in the Great Migration to northern and midwestern industrial cities, which had more jobs and offered less oppressive social conditions.

A reverse migration has brought new residents to the South, and the city of Fayetteville has grown markedly since 1980, as has the county. The city's population increased from 2,715 in 1980 to 18,957 in 2020.

== Demographics ==
Historical population
| Census | Pop. | Note | %± |
|---|---|---|---|
| 1880 | 138 | | — |
| 1890 | 380 | | 175.4% |
| 1900 | 430 | | 13.2% |
| 1910 | 709 | | 64.9% |
| 1920 | 952 | | 34.3% |
| 1930 | 796 | | −16.4% |
| 1940 | 832 | | 4.5% |
| 1950 | 1,032 | | 24.0% |
| 1960 | 1,389 | | 34.6% |
| 1970 | 2,160 | | 55.5% |
| 1980 | 2,715 | | 25.7% |
| 1990 | 5,827 | | 114.6% |
| 2000 | 11,148 | | 91.3% |
| 2010 | 15,945 | | 43.0% |
| 2020 | 18,957 | | 18.9% |
| 2025 (est.) | 20,465 | ▲ | 8.0% |
U.S. Decennial Census; 2025

=== 2020 census ===
As of the 2020 census, Fayetteville had a population of 18,957. The median age was 42.3 years. 22.0% of residents were under the age of 18 and 19.6% of residents were 65 years of age or older. For every 100 females there were 82.6 males, and for every 100 females age 18 and over there were 78.9 males age 18 and over.

100.0% of residents lived in urban areas, while 0.0% lived in rural areas.

There were 7,301 households in Fayetteville, of which 32.2% had children under the age of 18 living in them. Of all households, 46.9% were married-couple households, 13.9% were households with a male householder and no spouse or partner present, and 35.8% were households with a female householder and no spouse or partner present. About 29.4% of all households were made up of individuals and 15.3% had someone living alone who was 65 years of age or older. These households included 4,833 families.

There were 7,948 housing units, of which 8.1% were vacant. The homeowner vacancy rate was 2.4% and the rental vacancy rate was 11.2%.

Racial composition as of the 2020 census
| Race | Number | Percent |
|---|---|---|
| White | 7,342 | 38.7% |
| Black or African American | 8,481 | 44.7% |
| American Indian and Alaska Native | 52 | 0.3% |
| Asian | 1,154 | 6.1% |
| Native Hawaiian and Other Pacific Islander | 6 | 0.0% |
| Some other race | 614 | 3.2% |
| Two or more races | 1,308 | 6.9% |
| Hispanic or Latino (of any race) | 1,339 | 7.1% |

== Government ==
The city has a mayor-council form of elected government. Five council members are elected at-large, in non-partisan post, and the mayor is elected at-large in a non-partisan race.

In 2015 Ed Johnson was elected mayor, the first African American to serve in the position. The retired US Naval Commander and pastor of Fayette County's oldest black church is described as a consensus builder. In 2011 Johnson was elected as the first black member of the city council after having served three terms as president of the local chapter of the NAACP.

Johnson was re-elected in 2019.

== Education ==
The city is served by the Fayette County School System.

In 2016, a soundstage at Pinewood Studios was open for educational use by the Georgia Film Academy. In late 2020, the Georgia Film Academy partnered with Trilith and the University of Georgia to launch its Master of Fine Arts film program; students would work and live in Trilith during their second year. Trilith also has a small K-12 school called the Forest School.

Georgia Military College has a campus in Fayetteville.

== Points of interest ==
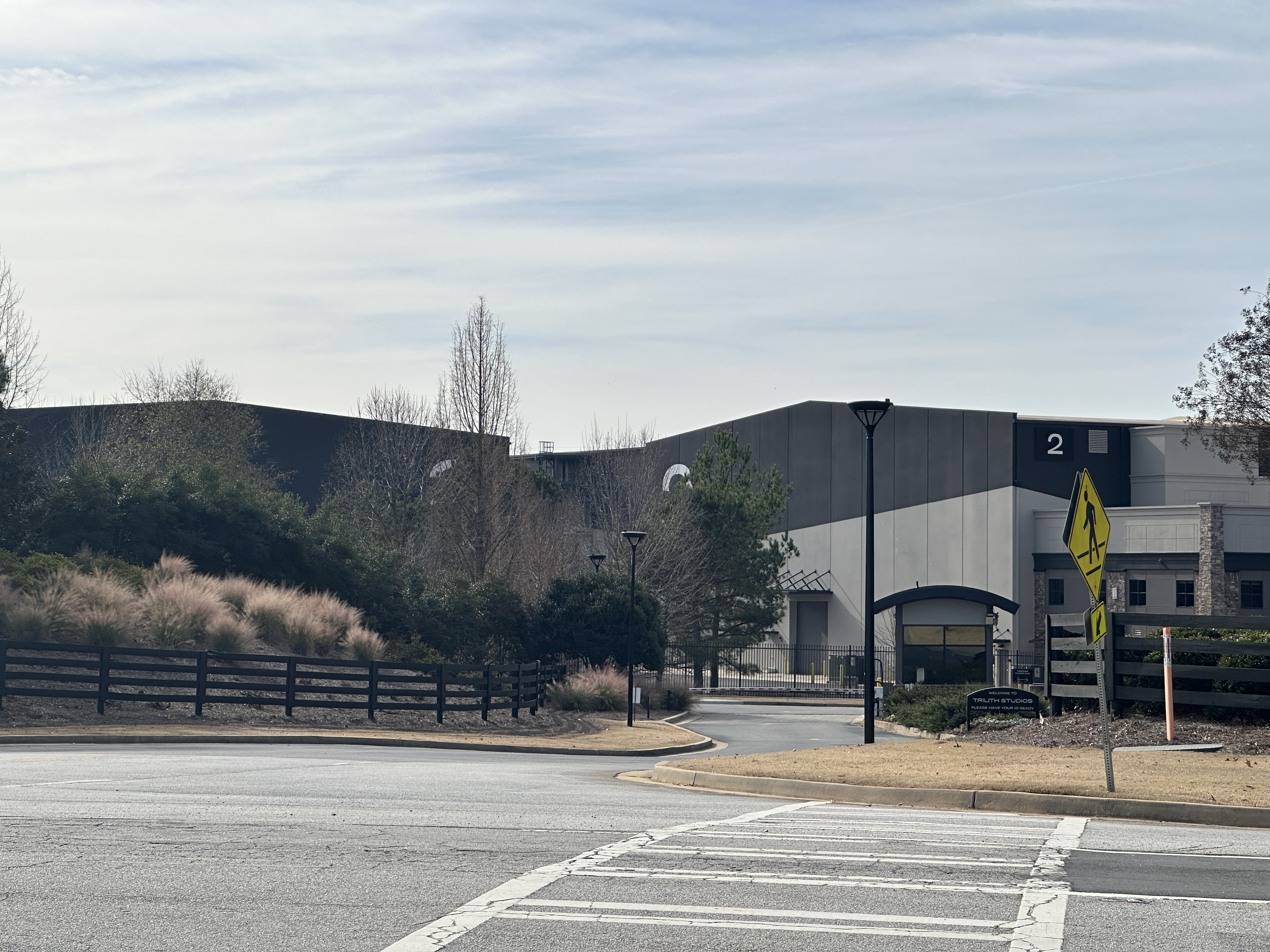
Located in Fayetteville, Trilith Studios is the largest production facility in the state of Georgia.

The Fayette County Courthouse, built in 1825 four years after the county and town's founding, is the oldest surviving courthouse in Georgia. It is located in the center of the Fayetteville town square. Since the construction of a new courthouse, the 1825 building has been adapted for use as the local welcome center. It holds offices for Fayetteville Main Street and the Fayette County Development Authority.

The Holliday-Dorsey-Fife House was built in 1855 by John Stiles Holliday, uncle of the western gambler John Henry "Doc" Holliday.

The Margaret Mitchell Library, built in 1948 and named in honor of the author, serves as the headquarters of the Fayette County Historical Society. Among its holdings are Civil War and genealogical records.

The residence formally occupied by deceased professional wrestler Chris Benoit and his nuclear family until June 2007, within which a high-profile double-murder and suicide tragedy occurred, is located in Fayetteville.

Trilith Studios, then Pinewood Atlanta Studios, opened here in 2014; it was a joint venture between British company Pinewood Group and River's Rock LLC, an independently managed trust of the Cathy family, founders of the Chick-fil-A fast-food chain. In 2020 River's Rock bought out Pinewood's share of the studio. It is the largest film and television production studio in the United States outside the state of California. The studio has produced many large budget films, including several in the Marvel Cinematic Universe such as Avengers: Infinity War, Avengers: Endgame, and Black Panther.

In 2016, the Pinewood Forest mixed-use complex was launched. Located across the street from the studio, it features homes along with plans for "a movie theater, restaurants, boutique hotels, retail and office space", built using environmentally friendly building materials. In 2020, when the studio was renamed Trilith Studios, Pinewood Forest was renamed the Town at Trilith. In April 2021, Atlanta magazine ranked the community ninth in their top ten metro Atlanta vibrant city centers list; the community was also the newest featured on the list.

== Notable people ==
- Andrew Adams, football player for the Tampa Bay Buccaneers
- Brian Branch, football player for the Detroit Lions
- Paris Bennett, American Idol Season 5: fifth place finalist
- Chris Benoit, Canadian professional wrestler
- Brandon Boykin, former NFL player for the Philadelphia Eagles
- Zac Brown, Grammy Award-winning country music singer
- Tonya Butler, football player for the University of West Alabama Tigers
- Phil Cofer, basketball player for the Florida State Seminoles
- Matt Daniels, football player for the St. Louis Rams
- John Deraney, football player for the Detroit Lions
- Creflo Dollar, televangelist
- Hugh M. Dorsey, governor of Georgia
- Kyle Dugger, football player for the New England Patriots
- Mike Duke, former CEO of Walmart
- Niko Goodrum, Major League Baseball player for the Detroit Tigers
- Mike Hilton, NFL defensive back
- Ufomba Kamalu, NFL defensive end for the Houston Texans
- Zach John King, country music singer
- Emmanuel Lewis, actor, Webster
- Sam Martin, football player for the Buffalo Bills
- Christopher Massey, actor, musician, director, film producer
- Kyle Massey, actor, musician, Dancing with the Stars
- Ann Nesby, Grammy Award-winning singer and actress
- Kelley O'Hara, player for United States women's national soccer team and Utah Royals FC in the National Women's Soccer League; Olympic and World Cup champion
- Paul Orndorff, professional wrestler
- Plumb (born Tiffany Arbuckle Lee), songwriter, recording artist, performer and author
- Keshia Knight Pulliam, actress, The Cosby Show, Tyler Perry's House of Payne
- William Regal (born Darren Matthews), English professional wrestler
- Nellie Mae Rowe, folk artist
- Ferrol Sams, author
- Jabari Smith Jr., NBA forward for the Houston Rockets
- Speech, leader of Arrested Development
- Christian Taylor, track and field athlete, Olympic gold medalist
- Anna Watson, "The World's Strongest Cheerleader"
- Gary Anthony Williams, actor and star of Special Agent Oso on the Disney Channel
- Hossein Khosrow Ali Vaziri, professional American wrestler, also known as ‘The Iron Sheik’
- Millie Bobby Brown, actress and film producer
