= 2027 United States ballot measures =

The following ballot measures, initiated by legislators or citizens, may appear on various states' ballots during the 2027 United States elections.

== By state ==
=== Louisiana ===
Origin	Status	Measure	Description (Result of a "yes" vote)	Date	Yes	No
Legislature	On ballot	Louisiana Supreme Court Jurisdiction for Lawyer Disciplinary Proceedings Amendment	Expand the Louisiana Supreme Court's constitutional authority over lawyer disciplinary proceedings to include certain lawyers who are not members of the state bar	April 17, 2026	Awaiting results	

=== Oklahoma ===
Origin	Status	Measure	Description (Result of a "yes" vote)	Date	Yes	No
Automatic	On ballot	State Question 848	Call a state constitutional convention	April 6, 2027	Awaiting results	

== Proposed measures ==
The following measures have not been approved for the ballot but are undergoing circulation or have been proposed in the state legislature:

=== Louisiana ===
- Require Governor to Certify Legislative Addresses Removing Judges for Cause Amendment
- Require Prosecutor Consent to Waive Jury Trial Amendment

=== Maine ===
- Birth Certificate Sex Requirement for Public School Sports Initiative
- Create a Publicly Funded Healthcare System Initiative
- Criminalize the Use of Recreational Marijuana Initiative

=== Ohio ===
- Eliminate and Prohibit Taxes on Real Property Initiative
- Equality of Rights Under the Law Amendment
- Prohibition of Data Center Construction Initiative
- Right to Civil Action Against Government Actors and Prohibit Immunity Defenses for Constitutional Violations Initiative
