= Holliday-Dorsey-Fife House =

Historic house in Georgia, United States

- U.S. National Register of Historic Places
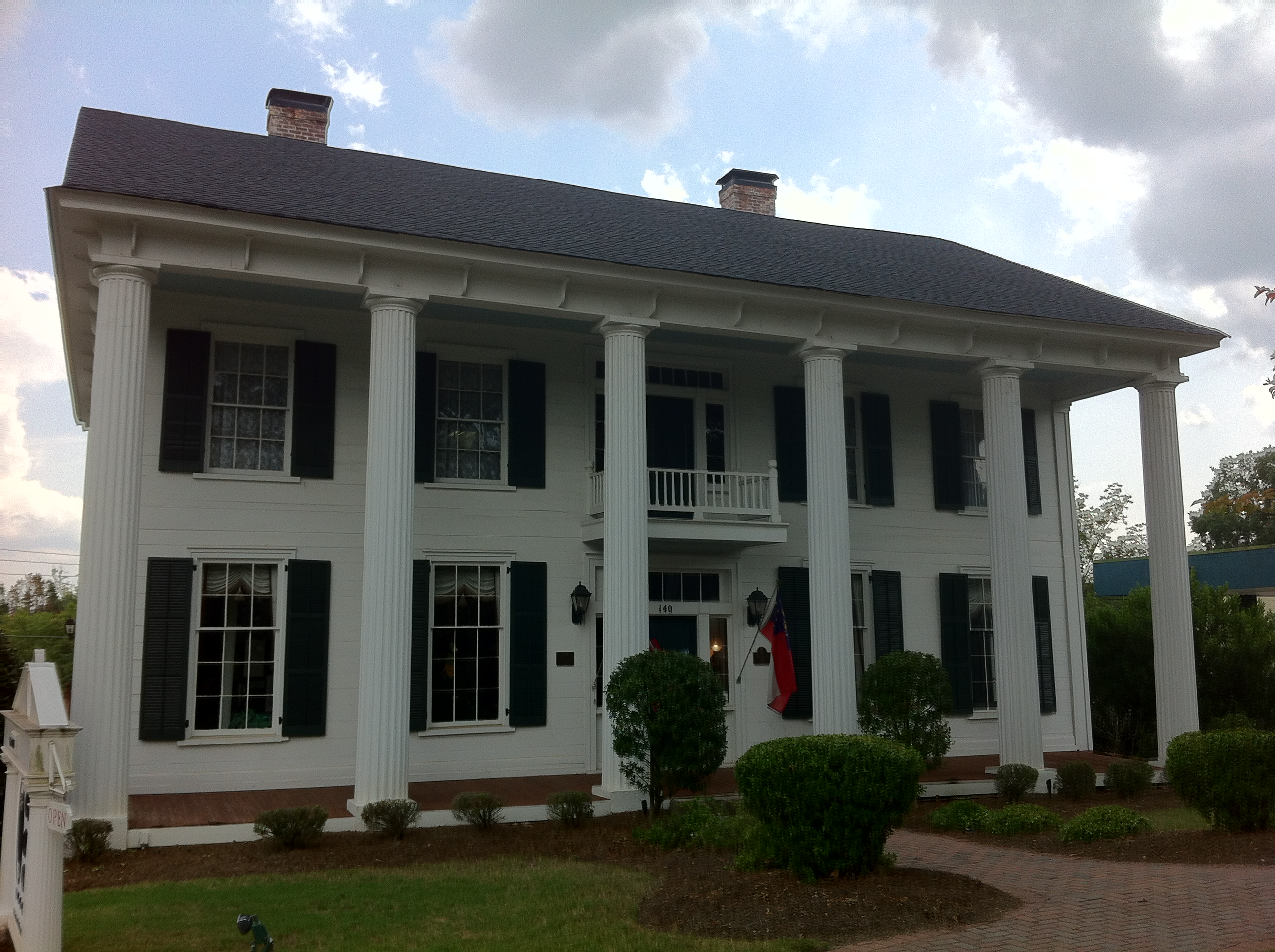

- Location within Georgia
- Location: 140 Lanier Ave., Fayetteville, Georgia
- Coordinates: 33°26′48″N 84°28′7″W
- Area: 0.7 acres (0.28 ha)
- Built: 1847
- Architectural style: Greek Revival
- NRHP reference No.: 08000263
- Added to NRHP: April 10, 2008

The Holliday-Dorsey-Fife House in Fayetteville, Georgia, one block west of the city's courthouse square, was built in 1847. It was listed on the National Register of Historic Places in 2008.

== Description and history ==
It is an antebellum Greek Revival-style house. It was built in 1847, but a major renovation and expansion in 1855 created its current appearance. It was built for Dr. John Stiles Holliday (Doc Holliday’s Uncle) who practiced medicine in the house from 1847 to 1865.

The city of Fayetteville purchased the house in 1999 and it was subsequently used for a local history museum.
