= Rex Richardson =

American politician (born 1983)

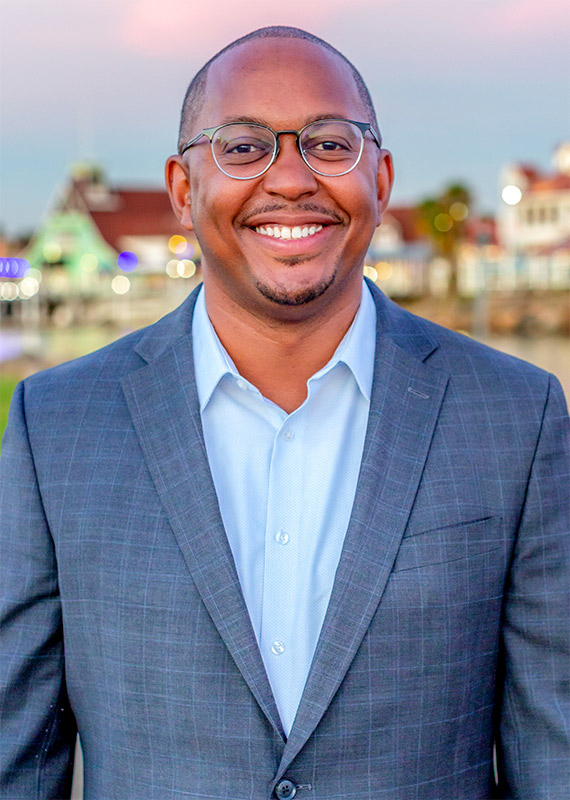
- Official portrait, 2022

29th Mayor of Long Beach
- Incumbent
- Assumed office December 20, 2022
- Preceded by: Robert Garcia

Vice Mayor of Long Beach
- In office August 2, 2016 – December 20, 2022
- Preceded by: Suja Lowenthal
- Succeeded by: Cindy Allen

Member of the Long Beach City Council from the 9th district
- In office July 15, 2014 – December 20, 2022
- Preceded by: Steven Neal
- Succeeded by: Joni Ricks-Oddie

Personal details
- Born: August 18, 1983 (age 43) Scott Air Force Base, Illinois, U.S.
- Party: Democratic
- Spouse: Nina
- Children: 2
- Education: California State University, Dominguez Hills (BPhil)

Rex Richardson (born August 18, 1983) is an American politician who is the mayor of Long Beach, California, since 2022. A member of the Democratic Party, Richardson was previously a member of the Long Beach City Council, representing the 9th District from 2014 until 2022.

== Early life and career ==
Richardson was born on August 18, 1983, at Scott Air Force Base in Illinois. His father was a member of the United States Air Force and his mother worked for General Motors as a welder on their assembly line. After his parents' divorce, he and his siblings relocated with their mother, living in Michigan, Minnesota, Missouri, and Pickens County, Alabama, before moving to California when he was 11 years old. He graduated from Covina High School and enrolled at California State University, Dominguez Hills. He dropped out of college without graduating to take a job as a community organizer for the Service Employees International Union Local 721.

In 2010, Steve Neal, the member of the Long Beach City Council for the ninth district, hired Richardson as his chief of staff and tasked him with organizing community groups in the district. In 2014, Neal ran for the California Assembly, and Richardson was elected to the city council to succeed him. In 2015, he rolled out the My Brother's Keeper Challenge to Long Beach. He was elected vice mayor of Long Beach in 2016. Richardson returned to college through remote learning in 2020, and completed his bachelor's degree from Cal State Dominguez Hills.

== Mayor of Long Beach ==
=== Election ===
Richardson announced his candidacy for the mayoralty of Long Beach in January 2022, upon Robert Garcia's retirement to run for the United States House of Representatives. He received the endorsements of Senator Alex Padilla, Governor Gavin Newsom, and the outgoing Mayor Garcia.

In the June 7 primary election, Richardson and fellow councilor Suzie Price received the most votes, but since no candidate received a majority of the votes, the election advanced to a runoff. Richardson would win the runoff election on November 8, 2022, becoming the first Black mayor of Long Beach.

=== Tenure ===
Richardson was sworn in on December 20, 2022.

==== Appointments ====
The city of Long Beach, California uses a council-manager system. This means that policy-making authority lies within an elected governing body: the city council. Mayors can, however, make certain appointments.

In 2022, Long Beach voters approved the formation of a new Police Oversight Commission. To serve as its first commissioner, Richardson appointed former Sacramento County Inspector General Francine Kerridge. Her duties include investigating instances of unnecessary force and broader trends within the department.

Richardson cited increasing diversity as a major influencing factor in his appointment decisions. He has appointed 32 commissioners, 53% are women and 59% are members of racial minority groups.

=== Policies ===
==== Long Beach Housing Promise ====
The Long Beach Housing Promise was proposed by Rex Richardson and approved by City Council members in April 2023. Richardson launched the initiative to create more affordable housing opportunities for students and their families and to identify more opportunities for homeless prevention programs in Long Beach. In creating this program, Richardson worked directly with the president of California State University, Long Beach, the president and superintendent of Long Beach City College, and the superintendent of the Long Beach Unified School District.

==== Grow Long Beach Initiative ====
The Grow Long Beach Initiative is a long-term plan to expand Long Beach's economy. The purpose of the initiative is to find alternative revenue sources in order to help reduce the city's long standing reliance on fossil fuels and oil. The initiative focuses mainly on two industries: tourism and aerospace and aviation. Even so, the city is exploring other highly profitable industries such as healthcare, the Port of Long Beach and its supply chain, education, hospitality, and the arts. One of the recent developments of this initiative is the construction of a Hard Rock Hotel in downtown Long Beach. On November 13, 2023, Richardson formally announced the Hard Rock Hotel project. Richardson said the project aligns directly with the Grow Long Beach Initiative, because the construction of the hotel will help to increase tourism and transform downtown Long Beach into a thriving entertainment district.

==== "Roadmap to Downtown Recovery" initiative ====
On November 14, 2023, Richardson released a comprehensive three-phase plan to address public safety concerns in downtown Long Beach. The purpose of the initiative is to combat serious public safety issues facing downtown Long Beach, including trespassing, drug dealing and lewd behavior. The initiative places a strong emphasis on mental health issues. More specifically, the initiative includes the creation of the Neighborhood Safety Bike Team, increased patrol officers in downtown Long Beach, specialized drugs officers directed toward areas with high crime rates, and the establishment of enhanced "Quality of life officers".

==== West Side Promise ====
The West Side Promise was introduced by Richardson in his 2024 budget reveal, in which he proposed a 10-year investment plan to identify ways to improve West Long Beach's housing supply and economy, while maintaining climate resiliency.

== Fiscal year 2027 budget and public comment changes ==
In 2026, Richardson and City Manager Tom Modica proposed a roughly $4 billion fiscal year 2027 budget intended to address a $58.2 million structural deficit. The original proposal called for eliminating approximately 483 city positions, including 263 filled positions and 220 vacancies, and included reductions to fire and police services, libraries, homelessness programs, recreation, parks maintenance, public works and code enforcement. It also proposed contracting out services including parking collection and billing, reprographics and school crossing guards.

The proposed reductions generated substantial public opposition during the city's budget hearings. Library employees, residents and the Long Beach Public Library Foundation opposed plans to eliminate positions and end Monday service at five branches; by late August, the Library Foundation reported collecting more than 6,200 petition signatures opposing the reductions, while residents repeatedly attended City Council meetings to object to the cuts. The controversy was heightened by criticism of continued spending on the city's "Vibe City" marketing campaign and other initiatives while core services faced reductions. Richardson defended the proposed cuts as necessary to end the city's reliance on one-time funding for ongoing services and argued that long-term fiscal stability required structurally balanced expenditures.

Following the public opposition, Richardson reversed his position on the proposed reduction in library hours in September, saying that the volume of public comment had made residents' priorities clear. He recommended approximately $1.275 million in ongoing funding to preserve Monday operations at the five affected branches, while additional funding was proposed to restore Quality of Life police officers.The final budget package approved by the City Council on September 8 retained library hours, financed in part through increases in parking citation penalties and cannabis taxes. The Council approved the revised budget 7–2, with Councilmembers Cindy Allen and Kristina Duggan dissenting.

Other reductions remained controversial after the library restorations. The budget retained the elimination of Fire Engine 14, based at Fire Station 14 near Colorado Lagoon, for projected savings of approximately $3.88 million. A Fire Department analysis reported that removing the engine was expected to increase response times for structure fires in the surrounding area by more than a minute and would require engines from neighboring stations to provide additional coverage, producing effects elsewhere in the city's deployment system. Fire Chief Dennis Buchanan said that removing a resource affected the fire-response system beyond a single station or neighborhood, while Duggan and the Long Beach firefighters' union opposed the cut. Richardson and city officials argued that Station 14 would remain open and that a paramedic rescue unit would be located there, noting that most calls handled by the department are medical rather than fire-related.

The budget vote itself also drew procedural criticism. Allen and Duggan unsuccessfully sought to delay the September 8 vote, with Allen arguing that significant last-minute changes had not received adequate public review and characterizing approval without further discussion as "rubber-stamping." The approved plan increased 18 categories of parking citations to $100 and raised street-sweeping citations from $75 to $80, changes projected to generate approximately $2.2 million annually, while increases to cannabis taxes were projected to generate approximately $1.15 million. Despite restorations to libraries and several other services, the budget continued to eliminate roughly 180 filled positions as well as hundreds of vacant positions.

At the same time as the budget debate, Richardson supported a proposal to significantly restructure public comment at City Council meetings. Under the existing system, residents could comment on specific agenda items when those items came before the Council, in addition to general public comment periods. The proposed rules would instead consolidate most agenda-item comments into a single period near the beginning of each meeting, capped at 90 minutes unless extended by the presiding officer; separate comment periods would remain for legally designated public hearings such as certain land-use, zoning and tax matters. Depending on the number of speakers, individual speaking time during the consolidated period could be reduced from three minutes to 90 seconds or as little as 30 seconds.

City officials linked the proposal to implementation of California Senate Bill 707, which requires local governments to provide remote participation in public meetings. City Clerk Monique De La Garza estimated that implementing the hybrid meeting requirements would cost approximately $487,000 during the fiscal year, about $150,000 more than had been budgeted, largely because of overtime for staff, interpreters and personnel operating remote-comment systems. Supporters said consolidating public comment could avoid approximately $150,000 in those additional costs, with the savings proposed for library services and Quality of Life police officers.

Opponents argued that the proposal went beyond what Senate Bill 707 required and would diminish residents' ability to respond to staff presentations and Council deliberations before decisions were made. Under the proposed system, residents wishing to address several regular agenda items could be required to divide a shortened speaking period among those items before the Council had discussed them. Councilmember Cindy Allen argued that, at heavily attended meetings, residents could effectively have only seconds to discuss each issue and would lose the opportunity to respond specifically to individual items as they were considered. Other residents argued that moving comments ahead of Council discussion would prevent the public from hearing staff explanations, debate or newly presented information before providing testimony.

An earlier version of the proposal failed 3–5 in June after substantial opposition from residents; Richardson and Vice Mayor Roberto Uranga were absent from that meeting. Councilmembers Tunua Thrash-Ntuk, Suely Saro and Joni Ricks-Oddie supported the June proposal, while Mary Zendejas, Duggan, Megan Kerr, Allen and Daryl Supernaw opposed it. A revised proposal returned on September 1 and drew renewed opposition, with more than 20 residents participating in person or remotely and approximately 20 additional written comments opposing the changes, according to the Signal Tribune. The revised measure passed 7–2, with Allen and Duggan opposed.

Richardson publicly supported the revised proposal during the Council's deliberations, although the mayor does not ordinarily vote on City Council items. He argued that establishing a predictable time for public comment could improve accessibility for residents, particularly families and people unable to remain at City Hall for several hours waiting for an agenda item to be heard. Critics maintained that scheduling certainty could instead have been achieved without eliminating item-specific public comment periods, and some characterized the changes as inconsistent with the participatory purpose of the state's expansion of remote access. As of September 12, 2026, the public comment changes had received the Council's initial approval but still required final Council action before taking effect.

== Personal life ==
Richardson and his wife, Nina, have two daughters. They live in North Long Beach.

== Electoral history ==
2022 Long Beach, California, mayoral election
Candidate	Votes	%
Rex Richardson	33,791	44.11%
Suzie Price	28,331	36.98%
Joshua Rodriguez	6,286	8.21%
Raul Cedillo	4,563	5.96%
Franklin Sims	2,121	2.77%
Deborah Mozer	1,511	1.97%
Total votes	76,603	100%

2022 Long Beach, California, mayoral runoff election
Candidate	Votes	%
Rex Richardson	62,751	56.61%
Suzie Price	48,098	43.39%
Total votes	110,849	100.00%

2026 Long Beach, California, mayoral election
Candidate	Votes	%
Rex Richardson (incumbent)	57,843	57.40%
Joshua Rodriguez	17,657	17.52%
Chris Sweeney	9,739	9.66%
Lee Goldin	7,122	7.07%
Terri Rivers	5,485	5.44%
Oscar Cancio	2,929	2.91%
Total votes	100,775	100.00%

== See also ==
- List of first African-American mayors
- List of mayors of the 50 largest cities in the United States

Political offices
Preceded by Robert Garcia	Mayor of Long Beach; 2022–present	Incumbent
