= Bo Dorough =

American lawyer and politician

Mayor of Albany, Georgia
- Incumbent
- Assumed office January 13, 2020
- Preceded by: Dorothy Hubbard

Kermit "Bo" Dorough, Jr. is an American lawyer and politician who has served as the mayor of Albany, Georgia, since 2020.

== Early life and career ==
Dorough was born and raised in Cordele, Georgia. He graduated from Georgia Southern College in 1983 and from the University of Georgia School of Law in 1986. He began practicing law in Albany in 1987.

In 1999, Dorough was elected to the Albany City Commission as a Commissioner for the city's Ward IV. He continued to hold this position until 2008, when he ran for mayor of Albany, losing to incumbent Willie Adams.

== Mayor of Albany ==
=== Election ===
In 2019, he ran for mayor again, and he was one of two candidates, along with incumbent Dorothy Hubbard, who advanced from the November 5 election to a December 3 runoff. Dorough narrowly won the runoff in an outcome described by the Albany Herald as a "stunning upset".

Dorough himself stated that he was not surprised by his victory, noting that Hubbard had only won 30% of the vote in the first round of voting and saying, "I didn't really see it as a big upset." He was sworn in as mayor on January 13, 2020.

Running against three challengers, Dorough was re-elected to a second term on November 7, 2023, earning 53% of the vote to avoid a runoff.

=== Tenure ===
Dorough's first term in office coincided with the onset of the COVID-19 pandemic, which by April 2020 was one of the hardest-hit areas in the country. As Mayor, Dorough pushed through a mask mandate policy that was described as "controversial" among city residents. In the midst of the "Delta surge" in August 2021, Dorough reinstated the mask mandate.

Following a meeting with Senator Jon Ossoff in 2021, Dorough stated that federal funds Albany would receive following the passage of the American Rescue Plan Act of 2021 would prove a "godsend" for Albany's stormwater and sewage systems.

== Personal life ==
Dorough is married to Bonny Blackshear, with whom he has three sons.
