= Edward J Johnson Jr =

American politician (born 1953)

Edward J Johnson Jr (Reverend)
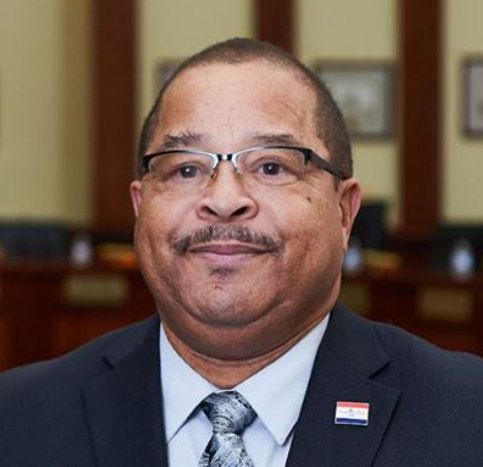

25th Mayor of Fayetteville, Georgia
- Incumbent
- Assumed office January 1, 2016
- Preceded by: Greg Clifton

Personal details
- Born: Edward J. Johnson Jr; January 31, 1953 (age 73) New Orleans, Louisiana, U.S.
- Party: Democratic
- Spouse: Vanessa O Johnson
- Education: Dillard University (BA)

Edward J. Johnson Jr. (born January 31, 1953) is an American politician was elected as the first black mayor of Fayetteville, Georgia on November 3, 2015. A member of the Democratic Party, he was elected as mayor after he served as the first Black city councilmember.

== Education ==
Johnson graduated from Dillard University in 1978.

== Fayette County Georgia NAACP ==
Johnson served three terms as the president of the Fayette County, Georgia NAACP.

== Personal life ==
Johnson is married to Vanessa O. Johnson. They have two sons and three grandchildren.
