= 2022 Hamilton County, Tennessee mayoral election =

2022 Hamilton County mayoral election
- August 4, 2022
- Turnout: 21.4% ▼7.6 pp
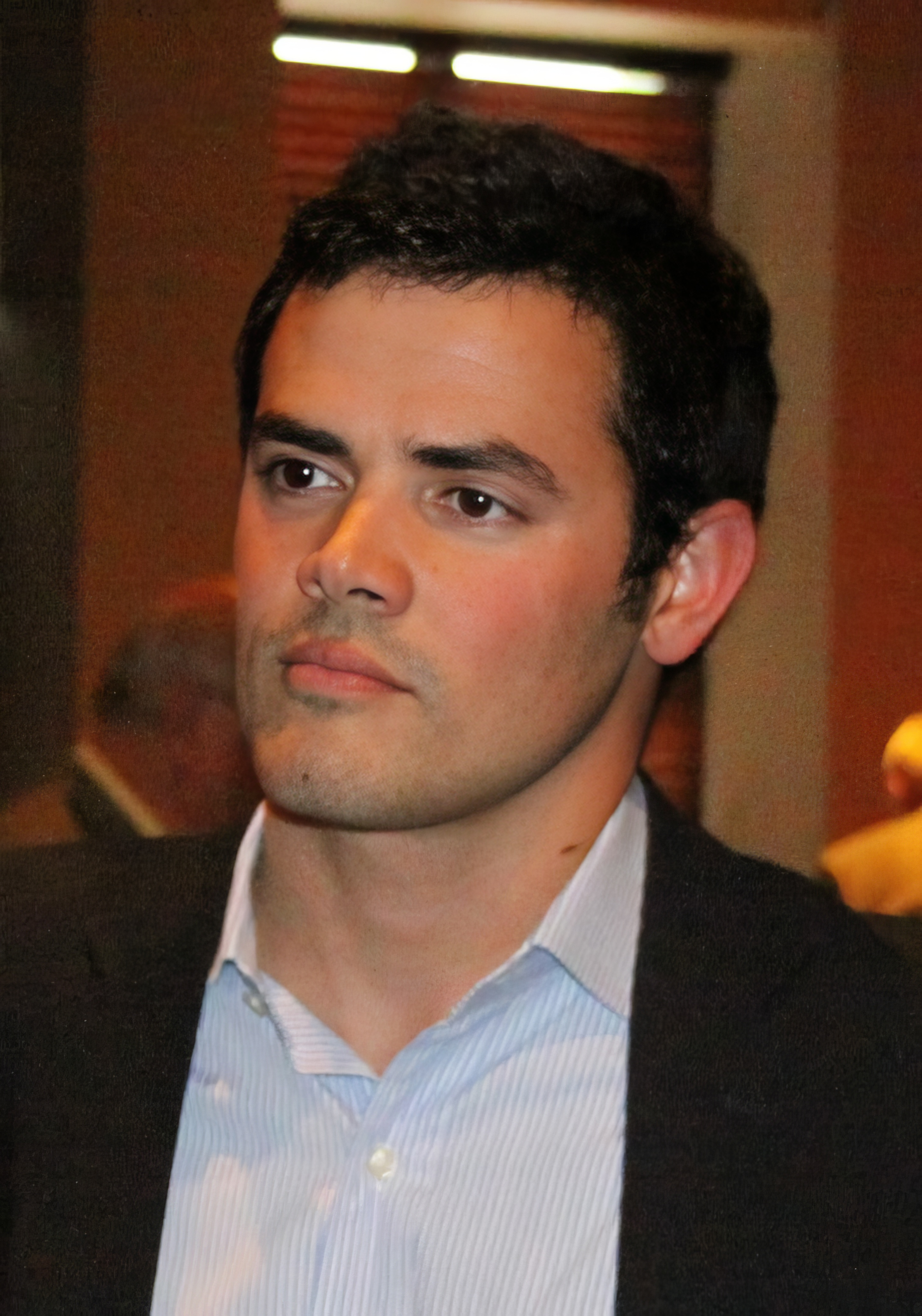

Candidate	Weston Wamp	Matt Adams
Party	Republican	Democratic
Popular vote	28,199	20,512
Percentage	57.89%	42.11%
- Precinct results Wamp: 50–60% 60–70% 70–80% 80–90% Adams: 50–60% 60–70% 70–80% 80–90% Tie: 50%
Mayor before election
Jim Coppinger
Republican
Elected Mayor
Weston Wamp
Republican

The 2022 Hamilton County mayoral election was held on August 4, 2022, to determine the next mayor of Hamilton County, Tennessee. Republican nominee Weston Wamp, son of former U.S. Representative Zach Wamp, won with 57.9% of the vote, defeating Democratic nominee Matt Adams.

Incumbent Republican Mayor Jim Coppinger, who was appointed county mayor in 2011, chose not to run for a fourth term.

== Republican primary ==
=== Candidates ===
Nominee

- Weston Wamp, businessman and son of former U.S. Representative Zach Wamp, and primary challenger to Chuck Fleischmann in 2012 and 2014

Eliminated in primary

- Matt Hullander, local business owner
- Sabrena D. Smedley, Hamilton County District 7 Commissioner and Hamilton County Commission Chair

=== Primary results ===
The Republican primary was held on May 3, 2022.

Unlike elections held within the city of Chattanooga, county elections use the plurality voting system, with no chance of a runoff. This was a very close primary, specifically between Wamp and Smedley, with Wamp securing the nomination by just 318 votes.

Republican primary results
Party	Candidate	Votes	%
Republican	Weston Wamp	14,428	35.44%
Republican	Sabrena D. Smedley	14,110	34.66%
Republican	Matt Hullander	12,171	29.90%
Total votes		40,709	100.00%

== Democratic primary ==
=== Nominee ===
- Matt Adams, 25-year-old Army veteran

Democratic primary results
Party	Candidate	Votes	%
Democratic	Matt Adams	5,876	100.00%
Total votes		5,876	100.00%

== General election ==
General election results
Party	Candidate	Votes	%
Republican	Weston Wamp	28,199	57.89%
Democratic	Matt Adams	20,512	42.11%
Total votes		48,711	100.00%

== See also ==
- 2022 Tennessee elections
- 2022 Knox County, Tennessee mayoral election
