= 2027 Cary, North Carolina, mayoral election =

- November 7, 2027
Mayor before election
Harold Weinbrecht
Nonpartisan
Elected mayor
TBD

The 2027 election for the mayor of Cary, North Carolina, will be held on November 2, 2027. Incumbent Harold Weinbrecht is eligible to run for a sixth term, and has stated that he intends to seek re-election.

Two candidates have already announced their intention to challenge Weinbrecht.

== Background ==
The most significant issues in the upcoming mayoral race are likely to be the town’s spending and the resignation of former town manager Sean Stegall. The scandal has led to speculation that this could be the first competitive race for Cary mayor since 2011. Stegall resigned in December 2025 due to controversies over a toxic work environment in his office, as well as concern over some of Stegall's spending practices. A report issued by the State Auditor's office in July 2026 found further evidence of a hostile work environment, real estate purchases done without consent of the town council, and over six figures spent on video productions not meant for the general public. The report was also critical of the town council's lack of oversight over the town's spending. State Auditor Dave Boliek said the town had a "culture of extravagant spending."

Weinbrecht said that he had no knowledge of Stegall's spending and that he misrepresented the town's financial situation to the council. Scott Lassiter and Mark Stohlman have seized on this as a key issue in the race. Stohlman has also criticized Cary's decision to raise property taxes, which they did by 8% in 2026.

== Candidates ==
=== Declared ===
- Scott Lassiter, candidate for North Carolina's 13th Senate district in 2024, former member of the Wake County Soil and Water Conservation District (2020–2024), former member of the Apex Town Council (2015–2019)
- Mark Stohlman, former mayor of Morrisville (2013–2017)
- Harold Weinbrecht, mayor of Cary (2007–present), at-large member of the Cary Town Council (1999–2007)

=== Potential ===
- Lori Bush, At-large member of the Cary Town Council (2011–present)
- Carissa Kohn-Johnson, At-large member of the Cary Town Council (2022–present)

=== Declined ===
- Sarika Bansal, member of the Cary Town Council from District D (2023–present)
- Michelle Craig, member of the Cary Town Council from District B (2023–present)
- Brittany Richards, member of the Cary Town Council from District A (2025–present)
