= 2026 Long Beach, California, mayoral election =

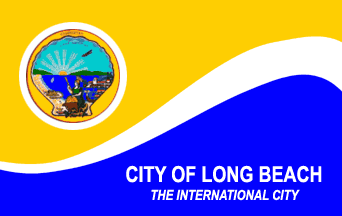
- June 2, 2026
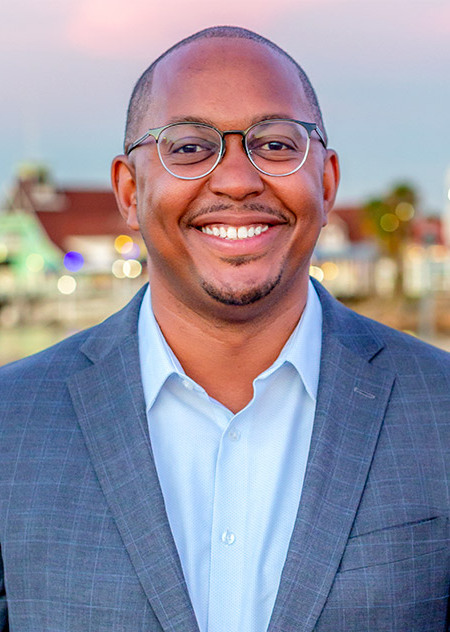

Candidate	Rex Richardson	Joshua Rodriguez	Chris Sweeney
Popular vote	57,843	17,657	9,739
Percentage	57.40%	17.52%	9.66%
Candidate	Lee Goldin	Terri Rivers
Popular vote	7,122	5,485
Percentage	7.07%	5.44%
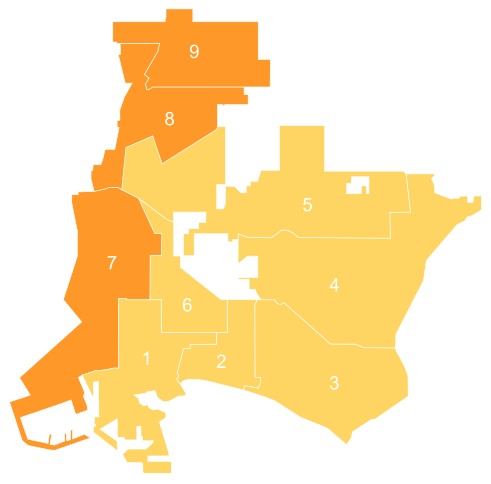
- City council district results Richardson: 50–60% 60–70%
Mayor before election
Rex Richardson
Elected mayor
Rex Richardson

The 2026 Long Beach mayoral election was held on June 2, 2026. Incumbent mayor Rex Richardson was re-elected to a second term.

== Candidates ==
- Oscar Cancio, school relations manager
- Lee Goldin, senior product manager
- Rex Richardson, incumbent mayor
- Terri Rivers, chief nonprofit executive
- Joshua Rodriguez, police officer
- Chris Sweeney, business owner

== Endorsements ==
Rex Richardson

Statewide officials

- Gavin Newsom, governor of California (2019–present)

Labor unions

- Los Angeles County Federation of Labor

Organizations

- National Conference of Democratic Mayors

Political parties

- Los Angeles County Democratic Party
Joshua Rodriguez

Political parties

- Los Angeles County Republican Party

== Results ==
2026 Long Beach mayoral election
Candidate	Votes	%
Rex Richardson (incumbent)	57,843	57.40%
Joshua Rodriguez	17,657	17.52%
Chris Sweeney	9,739	9.66%
Lee Goldin	7,122	7.07%
Terri Rivers	5,485	5.44%
Oscar Cancio	2,929	2.91%
Total votes	100,775	100.00%
