= 2027 Mississippi elections =

United States elections

- November 2, 2027

The 2027 Mississippi elections will take place on November 2, 2027.

== State Executive ==
=== Governor ===
Incumbent Republican governor Tate Reeves is term limited and can't seek another term.

== State Legislature ==
=== State Senate ===
All 52 seats in the Mississippi State Senate are up for election.

=== State House ===
All 122 seats of the Mississippi House of Representatives are up for election.
