= Long Beach City Council =

Governing body of the City of Long Beach, CA, US

- City Council
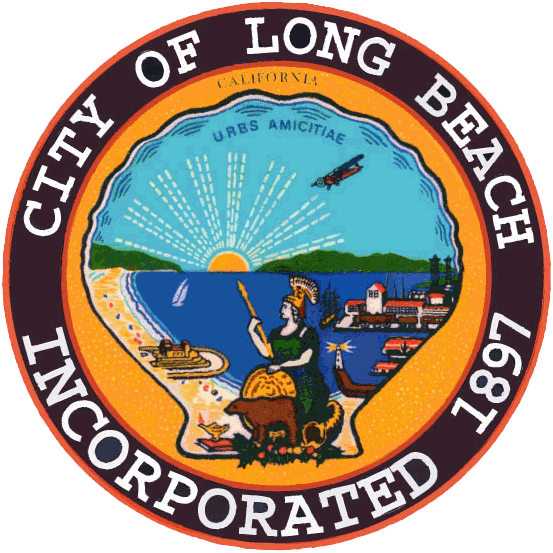
- Official seal

Type
- Type: Unicameral
- Term limits: 4 years

Leadership
- Mayor: Rex Richardson since December 20, 2022
- Vice-Mayor: Cindy Allen since December 20, 2022

Structure
- Seats: 9
- Political groups: Nonpartisan (de jure): Democratic (9)

Elections
- Voting system: Single-member districts. Mayor At-large.
- Last election: November 5, 2024 (general)

Motto
- "The International City"

Meeting place
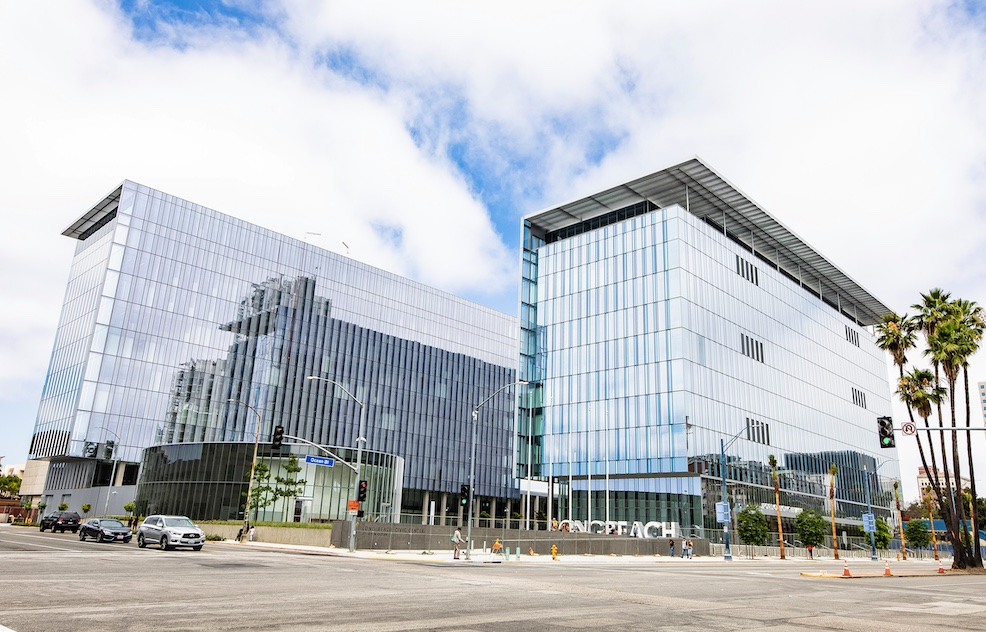
- City Hall; Bob Foster Civic Chambers; 411 West Ocean Boulevard; Long Beach, CA 90802

Website
- www.longbeach.gov

The Long Beach City Council is the governing body of the City of Long Beach, California.

The council is composed of 9 members elected from single-member districts for four-year terms. The Mayor is the chief legislative officer of the City and has the power to veto actions of the City Council, presides at meetings of the City Council, and has no vote, but may participate fully in the deliberations and proceedings of the City Council.

Long Beach City Council elections are held with the Primary Election in June for the Mayor and the odd-numbered City Council districts and in March for the even-numbered districts. Candidates must have a minimum of 50 percent to avoid a runoff, which takes place in November.

Every two years, at the same time that Council members regularly take office for new terms, the Council selects one of its members to be the Vice-Mayor. As of 2018, annual salaries were $36,170 for council members and $144,655 for the mayor.

Regular council meetings are held in the Long Beach City Hall on Tuesdays at 5pm except on holidays or if decided by special resolution.

== Current members ==
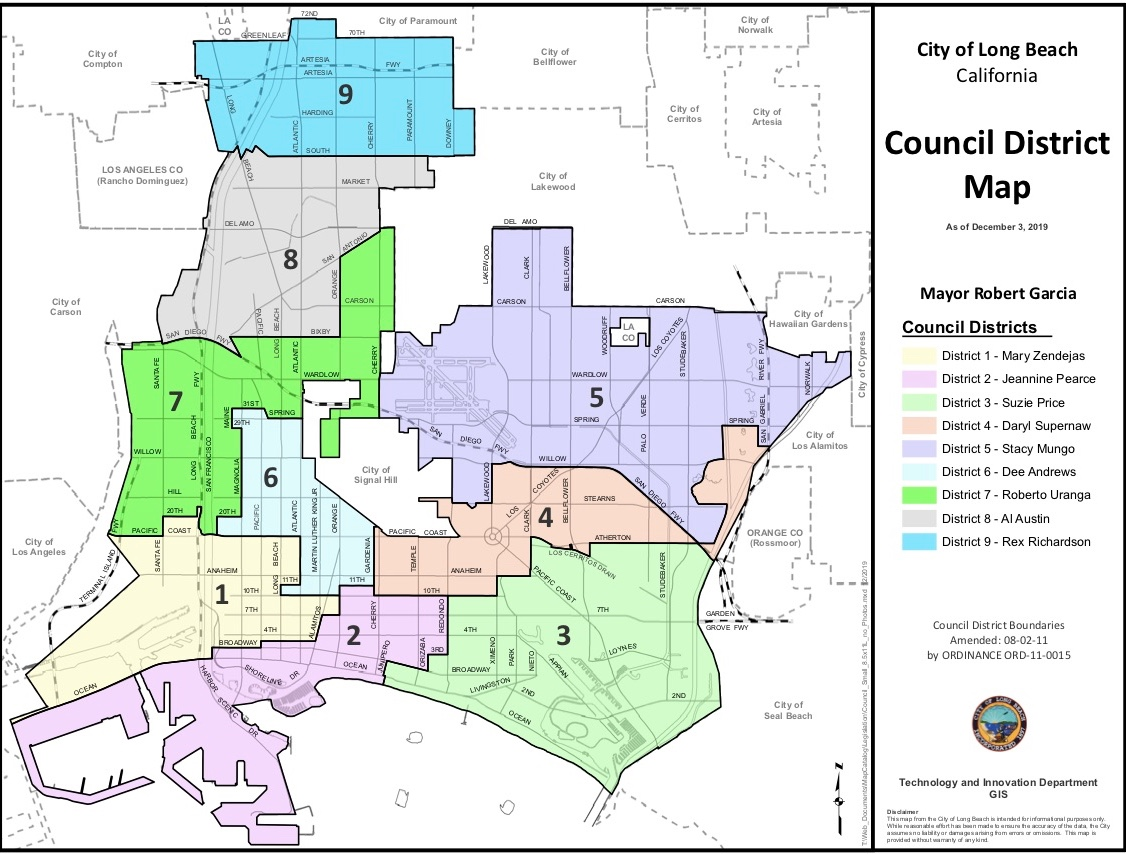
Long Beach City Council District Map eff 12-03-2019

Officers:

| District | Name | Party (officially nonpartisan) |
|---|---|---|
| Mayor | Rex Richardson | Democratic |
| Vice Mayor | Cindy Allen | Democratic |

| District | Name | Party (officially nonpartisan) |
|---|---|---|
| 1 | Mary Zendejas | Democratic |
| 2 | Cindy Allen | Democratic |
| 3 | Kristina Duggan | Democratic |
| 4 | Daryl Supernaw | Democratic |
| 5 | Megan Kerr | Democratic |
| 6 | Suely Saro | Democratic |
| 7 | Roberto Uranga | Democratic |
| 8 | Tunua Thrash-Ntuk | Democratic |
| 9 | Joni Ricks-Oddie | Democratic |

== Proclamation on foreign affairs ==
On December 19, 2023 the Long Beach City Council passed a proclamation in a 5-2 vote calling for a ceasefire in the Gaza war along with the "release of all hostages captured by Hamas". Councilmembers Megan Kerr, Suely Saro, Roberto Uranga, Al Austin and Joni Ricks-Oddie voted for the proclamation, councilmembers Kristina Duggan and Daryl Supernaw opposed the proclamation, with councilmembers Mary Zendejas and Cindy Allen absent.
