= 2027 Orlando mayoral election =

Upcoming municipal election in Florida, US

- November 2, 2027
Incumbent Mayor
Buddy Dyer
Democratic

The 2027 Orlando mayoral election will be held on November 2, 2027, to elect the mayor of Orlando, Florida. Incumbent Democratic mayor Buddy Dyer declined to run for re-election to a seventh term in office.

Municipal elections in Orlando and Orange County are nonpartisan. If no candidate receives a majority of the votes in the general election, runoffs are held between the two candidates that received the greatest number of votes.

== Candidates ==
=== Declared ===
- Anna Eskamani, state representative (Democratic)
- Tony Ortiz, city commissioner (Democratic)

=== Declined ===
- Buddy Dyer, incumbent mayor (Democratic)
- Stephanie Murphy, former U.S. representative (Democratic)

== Endorsements ==
Anna Eskamani

U.S. representatives

- Maxwell Frost, FL-10 (2023–present)

State legislators

- Carlos Smith, SD-17 (2024–present)
- LaVon Bracy Davis, SD-15 (2025–present)
- Vic Torres, former SD-25 (2016–2024)
- Johanna López, HD-45 (2022–present)
- Scott Randolph, Orange County tax collector (2013–present) and former HD-36 (2006–2012)

Local officials

- Monique Worrell, state attorney for the ninth judicial circuit court of Florida (2021–present)

Labor unions

- International Brotherhood of Electrical Workers Local 606
- Transport Workers Union Local 570
- Central Florida AFL-CIO
- Service Employees International Union Florida

Organizations

- Equality Florida
- Florida National Organization for Women
- Orlando 50501
- Sierra Club Florida
- Southern Poverty Law Center
