= 2027 Houston mayoral election =

- November 2, 2027
Incumbent Mayor
John Whitmire

The 2027 Houston mayoral election will be held on November 2, 2027, to elect the mayor of Houston, Texas. Incumbent mayor John Whitmire is running for re-election to a second term in office. Municipal elections in Texas are officially nonpartisan.

In 2025, the Harris County Democratic Party voted overwhelmingly to block Whitmire from future endorsement due to his participation in fundraising with Republican congressman Dan Crenshaw.

== Candidates ==
=== Declared ===
- John Whitmire, former state senator (1983–2023) and incumbent mayor (2024–present) (Democratic)

=== Publicly expressed interest ===
- Chris Hollins, former acting county clerk of Harris County (2020) and city controller (2024–present) (Democratic)

== Endorsements ==
John Whitmire (D)

Organizations

- Houston Police Officers' Union PAC
