= 2027 United States Senate special election in Minnesota =

- November 2, 2027
Party	Democratic (DFL)	Republican
Incumbent U.S. senator
TBD

The 2027 United States Senate special election in Minnesota will be held on November 2, 2027, to elect a member of the United States Senate to represent the state of Minnesota. The winner will complete the term won in 2024 by the Minnesota Democratic–Farmer–Labor Party's Amy Klobuchar, who will resign by January 4, 2027, to become governor. Primary elections will take place on August 10, 2027.

This will be the first U.S. Senate special election in Minnesota since 2018, and the first in this seat since 1978. This will also be the first odd-year U.S. Senate special election since the one in Alabama in 2017. Republicans have not won a statewide election since 2006, a U.S. Senate election in Minnesota since 2002, and Minnesota's Class 1 Senate seat since 1994. A male candidate has not won a U.S. Senate election in Minnesota since 2014 and not for Minnesota's Class 1 Senate seat since 2000,

== Interim appointment ==
After Amy Klobuchar won the 2026 Minnesota gubernatorial election, she will be required to resign as a U.S. Senator either before or within 24 hours after the 120th United States Congress convenes, before her scheduled inauguration as governor on January 4, 2027. She has not yet done so, and no timeline on when she plans to do so has been published yet. Either she or outgoing governor Tim Walz will appoint the interim senator dependent on when she resigns. Walz has reportedly declined to be considered. The appointee will serve until the result of the special election is certified.

Klobuchar has indicated that she would appoint a caretaker candidate that would not run for re-election.

Semafor reported that, by November 2026, U.S. Representative Kelly Morrison had emerged as the likely candidate for appointment, with outgoing Representative Angie Craig a "longshot".

== Democratic-Farmer-Labor primary ==
No candidate from the Minnesota Democratic-Farmer-Labor Party has declared or expressed interest. However, sources have floated that Angie Craig might be a possible candidate after losing the 2026 Minnesota US Senate DFL primary to outgoing lieutenant governor Peggy Flanagan for the other Senate seat, vacated by the retiring Tina Smith. Outgoing governor Tim Walz has reportedly declined to run.

=== Candidates ===
==== Potential ====
- Melvin Carter, former mayor of St. Paul (2018–2026)
- Doug Chapin, nominee for Minnesota's 6th congressional district in 2026
- Angie Craig, outgoing U.S. representative from Minnesota's 2nd congressional district (2019–present) and candidate for U.S. Senate in 2026
- Al Franken, former U.S. senator (2009–2018)
- Jacob Frey, mayor of Minneapolis (2018–present)
- John Hoffman, state senator from the 34th district (2013–present)
- Erin Maye Quade, state senator from the 56th district (2023–present)
- Kelly Morrison, U.S. representative from Minnesota's 3rd congressional district (2025–present)
- Erin Murphy, Minnesota senate majority leader (2024–present) from the 64th district (2021–present)
- Ilhan Omar, U.S. representative from Minnesota's 5th congressional district (2019–present)
- Rebecca Otto, former Minnesota state auditor (2007–2019)
- Dean Phillips, former U.S. representative from Minnesota's 3rd congressional district (2019–2025)
- Steve Simon, secretary of state of Minnesota (2015–present)
- Tina Smith, outgoing U.S. senator (2018–present)
- Trina Swanson, nominee for Minnesota's 8th congressional district in 2026

==== Declined ====
- Tim Walz, outgoing governor of Minnesota (2019–present) and nominee for U.S. vice president in 2024

== Republican primary ==
=== Candidates ===
==== Publicly expressed interest ====
- Adam Schwarze, former Navy SEAL and Republican candidate for U.S. Senate in 2026

==== Potential ====
- Michele Tafoya, reporter, retired sports broadcaster, and nominee for U.S. Senate in 2026

== Independents and third parties ==
=== Candidates ===
==== Potential ====
- Jesse Ventura, former governor of Minnesota (1999–2003)
