= 2027 Anchorage mayoral election =

Local election in Alaska, US

- April 6, 2027
Incumbent Mayor
Suzanne LaFrance
Independent

The 2027 Anchorage mayoral election will be held in April 2027. Incumbent independent mayor Suzanne LaFrance is running for re-election to a second term in office.

== General election ==
=== Candidates ===
==== Declared ====
- Natasha von Imhof, former state senator from District L (2017–2023) and former Anchorage school board member (2012–2015) (party affiliation: Republican)
- Suzanne LaFrance, incumbent mayor (party affiliation: Independent)
