= 2027 Columbus, Ohio mayoral election =

2027 Columbus mayoral election
- November 2, 2027
| Party | Nonpartisan | Nonpartisan |
Incumbent Mayor
Andrew Ginther
Democratic

The 2027 Columbus mayoral election will take place on November 2, 2027. Incumbent Democratic mayor Andrew Ginther is running for re-election to a fourth term. If there are 3 or more candidates a primary election will be held on May 4, 2027.

== Candidates ==
=== Declared ===
- Munira Abdullahi (Democratic), state representative from the 9th district (2023–present)
- Samantha Baker
- Andrew Ginther (Democratic), incumbent mayor
- Shannon Hardin (Democratic), president of the Columbus City Council (2018–present) from the 9th district (2014–present)

=== Potential ===
- Zack Klein (Democratic), Columbus city attorney
