= 2027 Colorado Springs mayoral election =

Local election in Colorado, US

- April 6, 2027
Incumbent Mayor
Yemi Mobolade
Independent

The 2027 Colorado Springs mayoral election will be held on April 6, 2027. Incumbent independent mayor Yemi Mobolade is running for re-election to a second term in office.

== Candidates ==
=== Candidates ===
==== Declared ====
- Dave Donelson, Colorado Springs City Councilor
- John Tiegen, militia leader and candidate for mayor in 2023
- Yemi Mobolade (Independent), incumbent mayor
- Stan VanderWerf (Republican), former chair of the El Paso County Commission
