= 2027 Tampa mayoral election =

Local election in Florida, US

- March 2, 2027 (first round); April 27, 2027 (runoff)
Incumbent Mayor
Jane Castor
Democratic

The 2027 Tampa mayoral election will be held on March 2, 2027, with a runoff election on April 27, 2027, if no candidate receives a majority of the vote. Incumbent mayor Jane Castor is term-limited and cannot run for a third term. Former Tampa mayor Bob Buckhorn, who was elected in 2011 and 2015, is running for a third non-consecutive term.

== Candidates ==
=== Declared ===
- Bob Buckhorn, former mayor (Democratic)
- Bill Carlson, city councilmember for the 4th district
- Ryan Edwards
- Anthony Gilbert, social media influencer
- Gary Hartfield, philanthropist
- Alan Henderson, entrepreneur and consultant (Democratic)
- Lynn Hurtak, at-large city councilmember
- Julie Magill, general contractor and real estate broker
- Tres Rodmon, paralegal
- Taryn Sabia, urban designer
- Reginald Strachan

=== Publicly expressed interest ===
- Bob Henriquez, Hillsborough County property appraiser (2013–present)

=== Declined ===
- Luis Viera, city councilmember

== Endorsements ==
Bob Buckhorn

Labor unions

- International Association of Firefighters Local 754
- Tampa Police Benevolent Association
