= 2027 Jacksonville mayoral election =

Local election in Florida, US

- March 9, 2027 (general); May 18, 2027 (runoff)
Incumbent mayor
Donna Deegan
Democratic

The 2027 Jacksonville mayoral election will be held on March 9, 2027, to elect the mayor of Jacksonville, Florida. If no candidate wins a majority of the vote, a runoff election will be held on May 18, 2027.

== Candidates ==
=== Declared ===
- Ron Armstrong (Republican)
- Keith Brown (Republican)
- Harry Daniel Long III (Republican)
- Donna Deegan, incumbent mayor (Democratic)
- Fitz Gerald Desprez (Republican)
- Wyman Duggan, speaker pro tempore of the Florida House of Representatives (2024–present) from the 12th district (2018–present) (Republican)
- Eric DuPree (write-in)
- Brandon Enamorado (Independent)

=== Filed paperwork ===
- Brian Griffin (no party affiliation; write-in)
- Rhachel Toombs (Democratic)
- Brian Hicks (Republican)
- Glenvin Owen (Independent)

=== Publicly expressed interest ===
- Rory Diamond, city councilor from the 13th district (Republican)

=== Potential ===
- Ron Salem, at-large city councilor (Republican)

=== Declined ===
- Lenny Curry, former mayor (2015–2023) (Republican; endorsed Duggan)

== Endorsements ==
Wyman Duggan (R)

State legislators

- Jessica Baker, HD-17 (2022–present)
- Dean Black, HD-15 (2022–present)
- Kiyan Michael, HD-16 (2022–present)
- Clay Yarborough, SD-04 (2022–present)

Local officials

- Lenny Curry, former mayor of Jacksonville (2015–2023)

== Polling ==
Hypothetical polling

Poll source	Date(s) administered	Sample size (Note: Key: A – all adults RV – registered voters LV – likely voters V – unclear)	Margin of error	Donna Deegan (D)	Wyman Duggan (R)	Jerry Holland (R)	Ron Salem (R)	Undecided
Matt Justice (Note: Poll commissioned for Holland)	–	418 (LV)	± 5.0%	47%	1%	29%	6%	17%
Matt Justice	–	160 (LV)	± 8.0%	41%	–	47%	–	12%

Donna Deegan vs. Lenny Curry

Poll source	Date(s) administered	Sample size	Margin of error	Donna Deegan (D)	Lenny Curry (R)	Other	Undecided
St. Pete Polls (Note: Poll sponsored by Florida Politics)	August 19–20, 2026	618 (LV)	± 3.9%	53%	31%	9% (Note: "Someone else" with 9%)	8%

Donna Deegan vs. Wyman Duggan

Poll source	Date(s) administered	Sample size	Margin of error	Donna Deegan (D)	Wyman Duggan (R)	Other	Undecided
St. Pete Polls	August 19–20, 2026	618 (LV)	± 3.9%	53%	33%	7% (Note: "Someone else" with 7%)	8%

Generic Democrat vs. Generic Republican

Poll source	Date(s) administered	Sample size	Margin of error	Generic Democrat	Generic Republican	Undecided
The Tyson Group	August 10–12, 2025	410 (LV)	–	37%	42%	21%

== Notes ==
Partisan clients
