= 2027 Indianapolis mayoral election =

- November 2, 2027
| Party | Democratic | Republican |
Incumbent Mayor
Joe Hogsett
Democratic

An election for the mayor of Indianapolis is scheduled to be held on November 2, 2027. Incumbent Democratic mayor Joe Hogsett is eligible for re-election. On November 22, 2026, Hogsett announced he would not run for a fourth term as Mayor.

== Democratic primary ==
=== Candidates ===
==== Declared ====
- David Bride, Indianapolis Department of Public Works administrator and former Vice Chair of the Marion County Democratic Party
- Andrea Hunley, state senator from the 46th district (2022–present)
- Vop Osili, City-County councilor (2012–present) and former Council President (2018–2025)

==== Publicly expressed interest ====
- David Becker, businessman
- Annette Johnson, Pike Township trustee
- Will Pritchard, former Indianapolis Public Schools board member

==== Potential ====
- Fady Qaddoura, state senator from the 30th district (2020–present)

===== Declined =====
- Joe Hogsett, incumbent mayor

== Third parties and independents ==
=== Lincoln Party ===
Nathan Gotsch, chairman of the Lincoln Party, has stated the party will run a candidate if Joe Hogsett runs for re-election.
