= 2027 Nashville mayoral election =

Local election in Tennessee, US

- August 5, 2027
Incumbent Mayor
Freddie O'Connell
Democratic

The 2027 Nashville mayoral election will be held on August 5, 2027. Incumbent Democratic mayor Freddie O'Connell is running for re-election to a second term in office.

== Candidates ==
=== Declared ===
- Freddie O'Connell (Democratic), incumbent mayor
- Joy Styles, metro councilmember for the 32nd district (2019–present)
- Lou Wilbanks

=== Potential ===
- John Ray Clemmons (Democratic), state representative for the 55th district (2015–present) and candidate for mayor in 2019
- Matt Wiltshire (Democratic), former Nashville Metropolitan Development and Housing Agency chief strategy officer and candidate for mayor in 2023

=== Declined ===
- Aftyn Behn (Democratic), state representative from the 51st district (2023–present) and nominee for Tennessee's 7th congressional district in 2025 (running for re-election)

== See also ==
- 2026 Tennessee county mayoral elections
