= 2027 Denver mayoral election =

Local election in Colorado, US

- April 6, 2027
Incumbent mayor
Mike Johnston
Democratic

The 2027 Denver mayoral election will be held on April 6, 2027, to elect the mayor of Denver. The election is officially non-partisan, though candidates are free to reveal their registered party affiliation. Incumbent mayor Mike Johnston, a member of the Democratic Party, is running for re-election to a second term in office.

== Candidates ==
=== Declared ===
- Lisa Calderón, co-chair of the Colorado Working Families Party State Committee, 2019 mayoral candidate, and 2023 mayoral candidate (Democratic)
- Durango Dank
- Mike Johnston, incumbent mayor (2023–present) (Democratic)
- Shontel Lewis, city councilmember from the 8th district (Democratic)
- Aurelio Martinez, tech worker and 2023 mayoral candidate
- Graylon Millen Cole
- Samantha Nazish
- Kenneth Simpson
- Xander Thomas
- Robert Treta, property builder and 2023 mayoral candidate (Independent)

== Endorsements ==
Shontel Lewis

Organizations

- Denver Democratic Socialists of America
