= 2027 Kansas City mayoral election =

Missourian mayoral election

2023 Kansas City mayoral election
- April 6, 2027 (primary); June 23, 2027 (general)
Incumbent Mayor
Quinton Lucas
Democratic

The 2027 Kansas City mayoral election will be held on June 23, 2027. to elect the mayor of Kansas City, Missouri, with a primary scheduled for April 6, 2027. Incumbent mayor Quinton Lucas is term-limited and unable to run for re-election. The election is officially nonpartisan.

== Candidates ==
=== Declared ===
- Ryana Parks-Shaw, city councilmember from the 5th district (2019–present) and mayor pro tempore (2023–present)
- Crispin Rea, city councilmember from the 4th at-large district (2023–present)
- Wes Rogers, former state representative from the 18th district (2019–2023) and city councilmember from the 2nd district (2023–present)
- Kenda Tomes McClain, attorney

=== Publicly expressed interest ===
- Darryl Forté, sheriff of Jackson County (2019–present)

=== Withdrawn ===
- PJ Guastello, businessman
