= 2026 United States elections =

- ← 2024 2025 2026 2027 2028 → Midterm elections
- Election day: November 3
- Incumbent president: ▌Donald Trump (R)
- Next Congress: 120th

Senate elections
- Overall control: Democratic gain
- Seats contested: 35 of 100 seats (33 seats of Class II + 2 special elections)
- Net seat change: Democratic +9
- Results of the elections: Democratic gain Democratic hold; Republican hold No election

House elections
- Overall control: Democratic gain
- Seats contested: All 435 voting members 5 of 6 non-voting delegates
- Popular vote margin: Democratic +14.1%
- Results of the elections: Democratic gain Republican gain; Democratic hold Republican hold; Result TBD TBD in runoff

Gubernatorial elections
- Seats contested: 39 (36 states, 3 territories)
- Net seat change: Democratic +6
- Results of the elections: Democratic gain Republican gain; Democratic hold Republican hold; TBD in runoff No election

Elections in the United States were held on November 3, 2026. In these midterm elections, which occurred during the non-consecutive second term of incumbent Republican president Donald Trump, all 435 seats in the U.S. House of Representatives and 35 of the 100 seats in the U.S. Senate were contested to determine the 120th United States Congress. Thirty-nine state and territorial U.S. gubernatorial elections, attorney general elections, and numerous state and local elections were also contested. The Democratic Party obtained a majority in the Senate and House of Representatives, and among state governorships across the United States for the first time since 2010.

The lead-up to the elections was marked by an inflation surge amidst affordability concerns, particularly on gas, healthcare, and food prices, exacerbated by the Trump administration's tariffs and Strait of Hormuz crisis caused by the 2026 Iran war. Democratic backsliding, corruption, income inequality, and foreign policy were also commonly cited in exit polling.

The results were labeled a "blue tsunami", as well as a rebuke of Trumpism (Note: Attributed to multiple sources:) and AI development. (Note: Attributed to multiple sources:) Analysts called the election results "a fundamental realignment" in American politics. The Democratic Party won the largest popular-vote victory in the House of Representatives since 1974, which took place in the wake of the Watergate scandal. Democrats flipped nine Senate seats, including in traditional Republican strongholds such as Alaska, Kansas, Mississippi, South Carolina, and Texas. They also flipped six governorships, giving Democrats a majority of governorships for the first time since 2010. This is the third consecutive midterm election in which the incumbent president's party lost its majority in the house of Representatives (2018, 2022, and 2026). This is the first election since 2018 that Trump as head of the GOP led the party to bicameral seat losses on the same ballot, and is the first election since the 2006 midterm in which both chambers of Congress flipped from one party to another in one election.

The 2026 elections saw the Democrats' biggest election gains since the 2008 elections, which took place during the Great Recession, and they were also described as the biggest blue wave election in 52 years. Republican losses were blunted by gerrymandering efforts in several states. A New York Times analysis of preliminary results concluded that, if maps drawn with nonpartisan methods were used, Democrats could have won nearly 20 additional districts in Texas, Florida and Georgia and approached a veto-proof majority in the House of Representatives. The Times analysis estimated that the mid-cycle redistricting gained the Republicans four to seven seats.

== Background ==
In the 2024 presidential election, Republican nominee Donald Trump defeated Democratic nominee Kamala Harris. Key issues shaping the campaign included public concern for the post-pandemic recovery and rising inflation. In the November 2025 general elections, Democratic candidates Abigail Spanberger of Virginia and Mikie Sherrill of New Jersey won their gubernatorial races over their Republican opponents by larger than expected margins. Democrats performed strongly in the concurrent state legislative elections, winning a supermajority in the New Jersey General Assembly and expanding their majority in the Virginia House of Delegates. In New York City, Zohran Mamdani, a democratic socialist running on the Democratic ticket, was elected mayor in a three-way race against Republican Curtis Sliwa and former governor Andrew Cuomo, who ran as an independent after losing the Democratic primary to Mamdani.

Trump called on Republican-led states to enact rare mid-decade redistricting to boost the party's chances of holding power ahead of expected historical losses for the incumbent party in the midterm elections, which prompted reciprocal redistricting. In April 2026, the Supreme Court, in Louisiana v. Callais, narrowed the circumstances in which Section 2 of the Voting Rights Act of 1965 applied to racial vote dilution. The Trump administration used over $20 million in government funds to fund pro-administration advertisements, including $10 million after claiming they would switch to using funding from Trump's Super PAC.

The lead-up to the elections was marked by an inflation surge amidst an affordability crisis, particularly on gas, healthcare, and food prices, exacerbated by the Trump administration's tariffs and the Strait of Hormuz crisis caused by the war in Iran. There were also concerns about AI-induced mass unemployment, its environmental impacts, and mass surveillance. Income inequality, democratic backsliding, corruption, and foreign policy were also major issues for voters in exit polling. The main theme of the elections was the United States affordability crisis.

ABC News, CBS News, Fox News, NBC News, the Associated Press, MS Now and CNN used the Voter Poll by SSRS to gather voter preferences and opinions for the 2026 elections. From 2018 to 2024, ABC, NBC, CBS and CNN used data from the National Election Pool while the Associated Press and Fox News relied on AP VoteCast. According to the AP Voter Poll, about four in ten voters said they had voted to express opposition to Trump, compared with fewer than two in ten who said they had voted to express support for him. Roughly four in ten said Trump was not a factor in their voting decision.

=== 2026 election developments and analysis ===
President Donald Trump promised that if Republicans won both the House and Senate, he would give every American adult $5,000. This would have cost approximately $1.25 trillion to provide payments to about 250 million adults.

Voters' views of Trump's presidency were an important factor in the election. During the 2025 off-year elections, exit polls found that many voted against Trump or said he was not a factor. Surveys released in late 2025 and early 2026 found that many viewed Trump's handling of the economy and immigration, two issues that propelled him to victory in the 2024 election, negatively. During elections held in his first term, Trump was on the minds of many who voted. In September 2026, Trump featured in a two-day midterm convention in Dallas to rally support and raise funds—historically, this type of event is reserved for presidential election years, although the Democratic National Committee had previously held midterm-year party conferences in 1974, 1978, and 1982. Many Republicans on the ballot attended, but many also chose to forgo the event, which RNC Chairman Joe Gruters dubbed a "Trump-a-Palooza".

During one of Trump's two convention speeches, he offered every adult American $5,000 if Republicans win the election, calling it a "Trump dividend". Trump's own senior advisors were unaware at the time of the announcement that this pronouncement was coming, and some of his advisors disapproved of the offer, with one calling it a naked effort to bribe people for votes. The offer drew much criticism and questions about the feasibility of the pledge, which would have cost over $1.2 trillion.

The outbreak of the 2026 Iran war on February 28 introduced further complications, with rising gasoline prices and other economic challenges emerging as central electoral concerns. Analysts argued that gasoline prices represented the most direct channel through which the costs of the Iran war were transmitted to American voters, and that domestic electoral pressure from fuel costs was a primary political driver behind the Trump administration's push toward a ceasefire ahead of the November midterms. During his 2024 re-election campaign, Trump repeatedly assured voters his second term would involve "no new wars". Polling released by CNN in September 2026 showed that only 26% of voters approved of the Trump administration's handling of Iran. In response to the general unpopularity and economic concerns of the Iran war, several Republican candidates have distanced themselves from Trump and his approach to the war and have called for operations in Iran to end. Senate Minority Leader Chuck Schumer compared the political environment in 2026 to the one in 2006, when dissatisfaction with George W. Bush's handling of the Iraq War led to many Democratic victories in the elections that year. Democratic candidates have leveraged the unpopularity of the war as a campaign point.

Sign outside of a polling location in Union County, North Carolina

The nearly seven-month-old war in Iran became a political liability for some Republican candidates ahead of the November midterms. In September 2026, two Republicans in tight Senate races—Mike Rogers of Michigan and Ashley Hinson of Iowa—called for a swift end to the conflict, distancing themselves from President Trump. Hinson, who had voted six times against measures to curb Trump's war powers, said Iowans "shouldn't have to foot the bill at the pump or the checkout line for the war in Iran". Rogers, who had previously backed Trump's strikes, released a campaign ad urging that the war "end and end quickly". The shift came as Trump's approval rating fell to 32%, a career low, according to a Reuters/Ipsos poll, with Americans souring on both his handling of the economy and the war. Diesel prices reached record highs, a particular concern in Iowa, where agriculture plays an outsized role in the state's economy. Other Republicans also moved to distance themselves: Iowa Representatives Zach Nunn and Mariannette Miller-Meeks reversed their stances and voted to limit Trump's war powers, while Representative María Elvira Salazar of Florida warned that Trump's immigration crackdown had gone too far. Democrats characterized the moves as election-year repositioning. By mid-October, the same polling series put Trump's approval at 31%—a record low for either of his terms and a point below where it stood two weeks earlier. The same Reuters/Ipsos survey had Democrats ahead of Republicans 47% to 35% on the generic congressional ballot, a 12-point gap that was the widest of the election cycle.

The administration's immigration policies, including deportations by ICE due to strengthened funding via the One Big Beautiful Bill Act, were also scrutinized. Polling found that Hispanics, who were considered a key reason for Trump's victory in the 2024 election, overwhelmingly disapproved of Trump and had largely swung back towards Democrats due to economic concerns and dissatisfaction of Trump's handling of immigration and deportation. An October Reuters/Ipsos poll found that majorities said the cost of living was their top issue for the election and that 76% of Americans blamed Trump's policies for increasing inflation, including 57% of Republicans. Signs of an enthusiasm gap between Republican and Democratic voters were noted by analysts as possibly forecasting a Democratic "blue wave". In September 2026, American political analyst Charlie Cook described this phenomenon as a "red undertow", arguing that anticipated Democratic victories would come not from a rising Democratic tide, but a drowning Trump brand.

A month before the election, polling consistently found that Democratic candidates were leading key races for state governorships and those that would determine control of the Senate, with large swings towards Democratic candidates by independent voters. The New York Times highlighted how Kansas, a state that had not elected a Democratic Senator since the Great Depression, had become a competitive battleground amid an unexpected surge of Democratic support deep in Republican territory. Furthermore, a poll commissioned by The Washington Post and George Mason University had to deal with the unusual issue of far fewer Republicans (12%) willing to respond than Democrats (32%), an exceptional gap. Democratic support came amidst multiple polls finding record-low approval ratings for Trump which some analysts considered was negatively impacting down-ballot races. Trump repeatedly told voters to pretend he was on the ballot to increase Republican enthusiasm. Both Democrats and some analysts considered this instruction to voters a mistake, due to Trump's low approval ratings. Increasing concerns about the Republicans' position in the November midterm elections have exposed tensions within Donald Trump's political structure. According to Reuters, Trump criticized his advisers for their election strategy, including decisions related to campaign spending and candidate selection. This is despite polls suggesting that Democrats could gain control of the House of Representatives.

In October, the Trump administration called for Ukraine to replace Volodymyr Zelenskyy as the nation's president and struck a deal with Russia to purchase the country's fuel in an effort to bring down diesel prices before the elections, and deepened Russian-American cooperation. The fuel deal was criticized by Democrats and some Republicans for undercutting the Lindsey O. Graham Sanctioning Russia and Iran Act of 2026, which allowed the president to waive tariffs or sanctions if he certified to Congress that doing so was in the national interest of the United States. Some Democratic lawmakers were concerned about Trump unilaterally lifting the sanctions against Russia, justifying their opposition to the bill.

Julian E. Zelizer has drawn a comparison between the 1966 and 2026 midterm elections. Writing for Foreign Policy in October 2026, he noted that the Republican campaign of 1966 focused on the economic cost of the Vietnam War, including growing federal deficits and inflation. He argued that the economic impact of the war in Iran, which had driven consumer prices up, gave Democrats an opening similar to the one Republicans had seized in 1966. Zelizer acknowledged that the Iran war had not reached the scale of Vietnam and likely never would, but said its economic effects had nonetheless been considerable—and in some respects clearer—and that the war had been unpopular from the outset. Political analyst Natalie Jackson told Al Jazeera that the polling pointed to a "pretty favorable" environment for Democrats. She traced this to public frustration with Trump and the economy—high costs driven in part by tariffs and the war in Iran—and said the prevailing mood was that Republicans had failed to deliver over the past two years.

==== Foreign interference ====
Foreign nations have sought to interfere with the 2026 elections. Since 2016, "the Kremlin has initiated online influence operations in every American federal election cycle", according to declassified intelligence documents. According to US intelligence officials, in 2026, Russia is targeting Americans with covert online disinformation campaigns to undermine confidence in the election and seed and promote domestic divisions with the goal to "inject chaos". There is no evidence that Russia has attempted to target voting equipment or compromise the voting process. US intelligence officials have described the effort as less extensive and coordinated than in prior years, with officials speculating that Russia is less interested in midterm races than in presidential contests and is distracted by the Russo-Ukrainian war.

US intelligence has speculated that Iran may have engaged in online influence efforts, and in August 2026 Meta Platforms reported a small number of accounts on Facebook and Instagram originating from Iran spreading AI-generated content with "anti-Republican views". US intelligence agencies speculate that, unlike in prior years, when China supported or opposed individual candidates based on their views, it may stay out of the 2026 elections due to fears of blowback. On October 14, 2026, the social network X suspended more than 13,000 accounts linked to Iran, Russia, and China ahead of the US midterm elections. According to Graphika, social media accounts linked to Chinese government influence operation Spamouflage posed as U.S. voters to post divisive content.

In a prime time address on July 16, Trump alleged (among other debunked statements) that China had collected 220 million American voter identification files including private information in 2022 and that it amounted to election interference. Trump then declassified intelligence records he presented as evidence that the US election system falls "catastrophically short". Election experts pushed back on some of the claims, stating that voter registration files are public and easily accessible in most states and would not necessarily allow interference with the voting process. On September 28, Defense Secretary Pete Hegseth announced the Department of Defense would launch an effort dedicated to combating foreign meddling in US elections that would use "advanced intelligence and cyber capabilities to identify, disrupt, and neutralize foreign interference". Democratic leaders of the House and Senate intelligence committees have expressed worry that Trump will use claims of foreign interference in an attempt to intervene in the midterm elections. An analysis of political advertising related to the Iran war found that 61 of the 65 ads examined between September 1 and October 14, 2026, focused on the cost of living. The ads aired more than 43,000 times on television, with an estimated total expenditure of $42 million.

=== Attempted election subversion by Republicans ===
States that have undergone mid-decade redistricting prior to the 2026 elections Finalized new map; Democratic gain expected Finalized new map; Republican gain expected New map finalized; later struck down in court Redistricting challenge rejected by courts Voluntary redistricting rejected

The second Trump administration has issued executive orders and other presidential directives instituting federal department and agency actions that have impacted election administration by state governments, federal election security and campaign finance agencies, and offices within the U.S. Justice Department for enforcing voting rights protections. The administration's actions on election law and voting rights have occurred alongside the administration's targeting of political opponents and Republican Party efforts to disrupt voting after the 2024 presidential election. Election lawyers at the Brennan Center for Justice and Democracy Docket have described the administration's actions as election subversion, while surveys of U.S. political scientists conducted after Trump returned to office have found a consensus that the United States is transitioning towards illiberal democracy and competitive authoritarianism.

In January 2026, The Washington Post reported that the second Trump administration had undertaken several tactics, including mid-decade redrawing of congressional districts for partisan gain, prosecution of political opponents, and a push to change voting methods and rules, that were meant to undermine confidence in the midterm elections. In October 2026, a New York Times analysis found Trump had attacked the integrity of US elections on more than 70% of the days since he returned to office, particularly with false claims about "rigged" voting machines and fraudulent mail-in ballots.

Upon returning to office, the Trump administration has dismantled election security efforts across the federal government. Such cuts have included: firing or reassigning personnel at the Cybersecurity and Infrastructure Security Agency focused on elections; defunding training programs for the Elections Infrastructure Information Sharing and Analysis Center; eliminating the FBI's foreign influence taskforce; downsizing and announcing closure of the Foreign Malign Influence Center; and firing all members of the independent Election Assistance Commission.

Trump appointed prominent 2020 election deniers into positions in government that could oversee the voting process. In the lead up to the election, pro-Trump conspiracy theorists and election deniers have won local races responsible for overseeing election results, and several election deniers are running for electoral offices in battleground states.

==== SAVE America Act ====
The Safeguard American Voter Eligibility Act, also known as the SAVE Act or SAVE America Act, is a proposed United States federal law that requires documentary proof of U.S. citizenship in order to register to vote in U.S. federal elections. The bill was introduced amid unsubstantiated claims that there was significant election fraud in previous elections, including voting by undocumented immigrants, as part of the immigration policies of the second Donald Trump administration. Opponents have claimed that the bill would disenfranchise eligible voters.

In March, the House of Representatives passed the SAVE America Act, an amended version of the previously proposed Safeguard American Voter Eligibility Act. The bill, if approved by the Senate and signed into law by Trump, would have required voters to provide proof of citizenship in order to obtain or renew their voter registration. Voting rights experts said that such provisions would disenfranchise married women, racial minorities, low-income groups, and people who legally changed their name, among others. The bill ultimately died in the Senate that June, with four Republicans joining Democrats to block its inclusion.

==== Cancellation and nationalization of elections ====
In January, Trump floated the idea of illegally canceling the elections, citing an expected loss in the elections and a distrust in democratic systems. White House Press Secretary Karoline Leavitt later stated that Trump was "speaking facetiously", and was "simply joking". In February, Trump stated that the elections should be nationalized to prevent voter fraud. On February 27, The Washington Post reported that several right-wing activists are working with the Trump administration to draft an executive order which, if signed, would effectively instate a national emergency and give Trump extended powers over the elections. Trump denied the existence of such an order. According to ABC News, Trump met prominent election denier Tina Peters on October 5 at the White House. Speaking to conservative podcaster Joe Oltmann on October 8, Peters' attorney stated that Trump "is not going to relinquish control again" if he believes the elections are rigged, and that "It's better—if we're going to have a civil war of any sort—that it be martial law with our side in control of the armaments."

==== Concerns over ICE at polling places ====
In February, Steve Bannon said the federal government was planning to send ICE to patrol polling stations in an attempt to prevent a Democratic victory, vowing to "never again allow an election to be stolen". In March, Stateline reported that legislation to "restrict immigration enforcement or the presence of federal forces" near polling places and other election sites has been offered or announced in California, Connecticut, New Mexico, Pennsylvania, Rhode Island, Virginia and Washington. The same month, the Associated Press reported that several Democratic-led states including New Mexico and Virginia were taking steps to counter potential tactics to intimidate voters. In May, Ned Lamont, the governor of Connecticut, signed into law a bill that restricts immigration enforcement at locations including schools and places of worship. The legislation also prohibits law enforcement from wearing facial coverings or personal disguises. Some federal laws prohibit armed federal agents from being deployed near election sites.

==== Federal investigations and false claims of voter fraud ====
Through early October 2026, Trump had attacked the integrity of US elections on more than 70% of the days following his 2025 inauguration, repeatedly making false claims.

Internal documents reviewed by The New York Times found a widespread effort by the federal government to promote mistrust in the integrity of the 2026 election, with Department of Homeland Security officials investigating over 150 nonprofit organizations they alleged were helping noncitizens to vote. Trump and Republicans have repeatedly made false and unsubstantiated claims of massive voter fraud by noncitizens, with The Times describing Trump as making the case that "any Democratic election victory is suspicious on its face".

As part of investigations into election-integrity, the Justice Department has demanded voter registration data from states, suing 23 states and the District of Columbia that declined to provide unredacted voter rolls; all of the sued states were led by Democrats or had been won by Joe Biden in 2020. In January 2026, a federal judge blocked the Trump administration from threatening to withhold election funding from states that did not provide their voter information or alter their voter registration forms or voter systems. Also in January 2026, U.S. District Judge David Carter dismissed the department's lawsuit against California, which had sought personal information including partial Social Security numbers for roughly 23 million registered voters, ruling that the demands violated privacy laws and writing that federal centralization of the data would have a "chilling effect" on voter registration; a federal judge dismissed a similar lawsuit against Oregon later that month. The department appealed the California ruling to the Ninth Circuit. In June 2026, federal prosecutors in Los Angeles publicly accused the state of blocking a voter roll audit and said they were conducting election fraud investigations while ballots from the state's June primary were still being counted.

The Department of Homeland Security engaged in a widespread effort to investigate supposed voter fraud. Per internal documents released by the advocacy group Democracy Forward, efforts have relied on the Homeland Security Investigations (HSI) division of Immigration and Customs Enforcement, which CNN described as part of a "phased national initiative involving voter-roll acquisition, data analysis, investigative leads and field investigations". A June 1 HSI report documented the Justice Department had reviewed more than 50.6 million records and an additional 48.4 million records from Heather Honey obtained through "independent sources of information". The 50.6 million records were speculated to have been received by unredacted voter lists handed over by over a dozen Republican states in the months prior. By October 2026, the Justice Department had sued 30 states to hand over their voter information.

In July, Trump and DHS Secretary Markwayne Mullin alleged they had discovered 270,000 noncitizens on voter roles in Nevada, California, New Jersey and Pennsylvania. Letters sent to states days later acknowledged the numbers had been inflated, noting Trump had stated "there may be as many as", and the letters did not offer any proof of the claims. Mullin later claimed there were 15,903 noncitizen voters in Nevada, although the Department of Homeland Security later admitted in a meeting with Nevada election officials the claim was unsubstantiated. DHS then stated 185 of the 15,903 were noncitizens of which Nevada disputed, saying after a state review all 185 were citizens and that DHS had "never provided Nevada with a list of 15,903 individuals" to begin with.

Ahead of the elections, Trump made false claims of voter fraud through mail-in ballots, calling it "corrupt" and "cheating", and encouraged Republican lawmakers to pass strict voter ID laws claiming it would "guarantee the midterms" for the GOP. In March 2026, Trump signed a new executive order on elections which would require the government to compile a list of eligible voters in each state and only allow the United States Post Office to send ballots to verified voters. Election experts described the effort as likely unconstitutional, and the announcement was met with promises to sue by voter rights groups and Democratic officials. On September 4, Judge Indira Talwani issued a preliminary injunction against the USPS plan, finding it likely illegal and noting USPS had no authority to control mail-in voting, and Judge Carl J. Nichols issued another preliminary injunction against the plan on September 13. On September 14, the Supreme Court ruled against the Trump administration's attempt to screen mail-in ballots finding the government was "unlikely to succeed on the merits" and that it would implement chaos and confusion ahead of the elections. Following the ruling, state election officials were described as moving to restore faith in mail-in voting, and Trump later encouraged Republicans to vote by mail.

In September, the Supreme Court allowed the administration to use the Systematic Alien Verification for Entitlements system to check voter rolls for noncitizens, although federal law prohibits "systematically" removing voters from voter rolls 90 days before an election. The Trump administration had overhauled the system to combine social security and other data to create a master database of citizens per Executive Order 14248. Lawsuits and court rulings had previously blocked implementation of the system, with judges finding the overhaul had violated law in combining private information and had removed eligible voters from voter rolls. Also in September, Homeland Security Investigations agents began going to homes in several states to ask residents about their citizenship and whether they had registered or voted. Some of the agents were armed. On October 15, the Justice Department sued California and Los Angeles County, asking a court to block the counting of mail ballots from more than 20,000 voters that DHS had flagged as likely noncitizens. NBC News reported on October 21 that the department was considering similar suits against other states. The department sought a Supreme court injunction immediately prior to the election on November 2, 2026, seeking to have up to 20,000 mail in ballots in California kept apart. The Supreme court denied this request on the same day.

In October, the Democratic Senatorial Campaign Committee, the Democratic Congressional Campaign Committee, the Democratic Governors Association, the Nevada Democratic Party as well as Senate Minority Leader Chuck Schumer, and House Minority Leader Hakeem Jeffries sued the Trump administration alleging that government's pressure campaign to remove voters from state voter rolls is unlawfully interfering with the midterm elections. On October 22, 2026, Judge Araceli Martínez-Olguín of the Northern District of California issued preliminary injunction that bars the Department of Homeland Security from conducting election-related field operations in California, Connecticut, Georgia, Missouri, Nevada, New York, Pennsylvania, Washington, and Wisconsin until the polls close on Election Day (November 3, 2026). This injunction covers field interviews and stops being carried out by agents of the Department of Homeland Security; Martínez-Olguín stated that the scope of these operations raised voter intimidation concerns.

On October 26, 2026, President Donald Trump announced a $1 million reward for information on voter fraud in past elections or the 2026 midterms, to be paid if the tip led to an arrest and conviction. Trump posted the offer on Truth Social roughly a week before the midterm elections. The offer came after the Trump administration had spent months demanding voter-registration records from state governments. The administration argued that stricter election oversight was needed to preserve public confidence in the vote. Political analysts and election officials—among them Democrats and several Republicans—characterized the administration's actions as overstepping federal authority. Several election officials told Reuters they were making preparations in case the federal government intervened in the midterms.

On October 29, 2026, days before the election, the Justice Department sent letters to election officials in all 50 states reminding them of the federal requirement to preserve election record for 22 months and stating that willful violations are punishable by up to a year in prison and a $1,000 fine. The letters, signed by Acting Deputy Attorney General Trent McCotter, did not cite a specific violation or investigation. A justice department spokesperson said the letter reminded states of their preservation obligations. Justin Levitte, a former Justice Department official, said the letter looked "meant to intimidate rather than to inform", while election law professor Joshua Douglas said he had never seen the department send such a letter nationwide days before an election.

Activists said they were preparing large-scale demonstrations if the Trump administration attempted to interfere with voting or the counting of ballots. At the same time, legal experts published guidance for judges on how to respond if the government attempted to take control of ballots. The war with Iran became a subject of Democratic campaigning ahead of the November 3 midterm elections. On October 24, former president Barack Obama criticized Trump's decision to launch the war during a rally in Cleveland supporting Democratic Senate candidate Sherrod Brown and gubernatorial candidate Amy Acton. Obama described the conflict as unnecessary and criticized the administration's foreign policy, urging voters to use the midterm elections to challenge the direction of the Trump administration.

===== FBI raids =====
In January 2026, FBI agents executed a search warrant at the Fulton County, Georgia, election center, seizing approximately 600 boxes of ballots and other records from the 2020 presidential election, an action election law experts described as unprecedented federal intervention in locally administered elections. Federal investigations of the 2020 election subsequently expanded to several states: the Office of the Director of National Intelligence procured voting machines in Puerto Rico for examination in February, federal officials subpoenaed records of the partisan review of Maricopa County, Arizona's 2020 results in March, the Justice Department demanded ballots cast in Wayne County, Michigan, in April, and FBI agents questioned former poll workers in Milwaukee, Wisconsin, in May.

David Becker, executive director of The Center for Election Innovation & Research, said the investigations were "about the 2026 and 2028 elections" rather than 2020, characterizing them as intimidation of election officials. John Keller, former acting head of the Justice Department's Public Integrity Section, said the administration appeared to be normalizing federal investigation of state elections in preparation for potentially challenging future results.

In June 2026, FBI agents searched the Cleveland offices of the Ohio Organizing Collaborative, a voter registration and community organizing group, seizing computers and questioning staff and volunteers across Ohio as part of a Justice Department investigation into the group's voter registration efforts; the Brennan Center for Justice said the search fit a pattern of federal inquiries targeting voting infrastructure ahead of the midterm elections.

==== Pro-Trump television ads ====
Five weeks before the midterm elections, the Department of Homeland Security allocated $20 million in taxpayer funds initially reserved for Customs and Border Protection from the One Big Beautiful Bill Act to air campaign-style television ads promoting Donald Trump, drawing widespread bipartisan criticism. The White House defended the ads as "public service announcements" aimed at promoting patriotism rather than campaigning. Senate Majority Leader John Thune told reporters, "I like the message, but it shouldn't be paid for with taxpayer money." Multiple legal experts contacted by the Associated Press said the advertisements likely violated federal law prohibiting "publicity or propaganda".

Following widespread criticism, Trump announced he would pay for the ads via a campaign account, but did not commit to reimbursing the government the $12 million already spent on the ad campaign. On October 11, a federal judge issued an order to stop the airing of Trump administration television advertisements funded by taxpayer money, but two other advertisements were also broadcast after the deadline set by the court. The next day, Justice Department lawyers apologized for the incident, saying that legal counsel had not been informed of the court's order in time. Overall, advertising spending for the 2026 midterm elections surpassed $10 billion by the middle of October.

==== Political donations ====
From July until November, Elon Musk spent more than $276 million on right-wing political groups to help maintain the Republican majority. With total spending of about $366 million, he has become the largest donor in the 2026 U.S. midterm elections. The donations include $158 million to the Senate Leadership Fund, the largest supporter of Republican Senate candidates, $76 million to America PAC, and $10 million to Lone Star Liberty PAC, which supported Ken Paxton, the Republican Senate candidate in Texas, running against Democratic candidate James Talarico.

As the 2026 election entered its final stages, spending by super PACs and dark money reached record levels. Hundreds of millions of dollars have been paid by major donors to influence government policy, with the largest donors tending to lean more toward the Republican Party. Public anger over the role of money in politics has been growing, and both parties promised to fight corruption if they win. By law, super PACs must operate independently of candidates, but in practice, candidates and these groups have often worked in close coordination. For example, Trump has repeatedly referred to funds raised by the super PAC MAGA Inc. as his own money.

===== Influence of AIPAC =====
Less than five years after entering U.S. political campaigns, the American Israel Public Affairs Committee (AIPAC) had raised $233 million, making it one of the best-funded groups in the elections. It also became polarizing, with many candidates rejecting its support, and some even highlighting opposition to AIPAC as a point of pride. Despite shifting public opinion, AIPAC continued spending heavily on campaigns. AIPAC invested over $54 million in U.S. congressional races through its super PAC, the United Democracy Project (UDP), making it the largest outside spender in the election cycle. Despite some victories, AIPAC faced significant setbacks, such as in Michigan, where its funding failed to secure a win for Republican candidate Mike Rogers, who was defeated by Democratic candidate Abdul El-Sayed, a critic of AIPAC and the US-Israel relationship. Critics argued that AIPAC's influence was waning, as many voters, especially Democrats and younger people, expressed a belief that the U.S. is too supportive of Israel.

This shift in public opinion led to discomfort among Republicans as well. AIPAC's financial power remained strong, contributing $30 million to UDP. Many candidates backed by AIPAC preferred not to mention its funding in their campaigns, recognizing its potential negative impact. During the election, AIPAC's strategy appeared to shift due to negative voter perception linked to Israel's actions in Gaza and U.S. military aid towards Israel, and they focused instead on funding other groups and uniting donors rather than directly endorsing candidates. Political analyst Trita Parsi noted AIPAC's previous power is fading, as its name is now viewed negatively.

==== Election prediction markets ====
During the 2026 US midterm elections, betting on election outcomes on prediction platforms such as Polymarket and Kalshi has increased significantly. According to a Reuters report on October 14, 2026, an analysis by the Anti-Corruption Data Collective (ACDC) shows that trading volume in these platforms' election markets has exceeded $220 million, while the figure was about $92 million in the 2024 congressional elections. Kalshi and Polymarket have partnered with various news organizations for election coverage. For instance, in December 2025, Kalshi partnered with CNN in order to include their data in news coverage. A similar deal was struck between Polymarket and Yahoo finance.

==== Alaska Senate election legal proceedings ====
On October 23, 2026, President Trump announced that he had personally requested that the Department of Justice file a lawsuit arguing that the 2026 Senate election in Alaska should not be certified if Democrat Mary Peltola wins. The filing's justification is that the appearance on the ballot of two similarly named candidates – incumbent Republican senator Dan S. Sullivan and independent candidate Dan J. Sullivan – may lead to voter confusion. Dan J. Sullivan had previously been affirmed by the state's Supreme Court to appear on the ballot when state election officials made allegations that his candidacy was an intended spoiler. The federal suit was dismissed by U.S. District Court Judge Sharon Gleason on November 1. On October 28, Alaska Governor Mike Dunleavy announced a state criminal investigation into Peltola's campaign after The New York Times reported that staffers may have intentionally recruited candidates, such as Dan J. Sullivan to serve as spoilers. On October 30 it was revealed that a federal investigation has been underway "for several months" already.

=== Louisiana v. Callais ===
Analysts had predicted that a decision in Callais reducing the scope of the VRA could allow Republicans to gain a significant number of seats in the U.S. House of Representatives from redistricting in the Southeast, where the VRA has generally prevented Republican-controlled legislatures from maximizing their numbers of "safe" districts. The New York Times estimated that, if the Court weakened the VRA, up to twelve seats could shift from Democratic to Republican control.

When the decision in Callais was announced, media outlets characterized it as a "landmark" decision, predicting that the additional restrictions on Section 2 of the VRA would likely make challenges to redistricting significantly more difficult. Analysts expect it will allow southern states to eliminate majority-minority districts, changing election outcomes. (Note: Attributed to multiple sources:) Justice Kagan's accusation that the court majority revived the intent-based standard from Mobile v. Bolden (1980) that Congress had repudiated in its 1982 amendments to the VRA was shared by journalists and legal scholars. The decision was seen by some media outlets as the culmination of a long-time grudge of Roberts against the VRA, others considered the decision as rendering the VRA effectively dead and harming the country's democratic process. The ruling was described by critics as starting a new era of Jim Crow laws, allowing for legal discrimination of minorities in the United States. The court's opinion was expected to affect all levels of government including state and local governments. (Note: Attributed to multiple sources:)

An analysis from The Guardian found that Justice Alito's claim that Black voter turnout had surpassed white voter turnout in two of the five most recent presidential elections, both nationally and in Louisiana, was based on misleading data and questionable methodology. Alito cited the brief from the Department of Justice which used "a proportion of the total population of each racial group over the age of 18"; however, that approach is "not favored by experts", who instead use "voter turnout as a proportion of the citizen voting age population or the voter eligible population". Following the latter analysis, the gap in voter turnout has actually widened, with Black voter turnout dropping since 2012, particularly after the Supreme Court's opinion in Shelby County v. Holder which struck down the preclearance formula defined in Section 4(b) of the VRA for states with historical discrimination concerns including Louisiana.

=== White House media ban ===
Donald Trump responds to Mary Bruce's question about releasing the Epstein files during his meeting with Saudi Crown Prince Mohammed bin Salman.

Donald Trump frequently attacks the American media as having a left-wing bias and being "corrupt", and also uses a variety of insults when speaking about outlets that give him unfavorable coverage. Trump has sued various media outlets for perceived inaccuracies or biases, and has used his position as president to pressure outlets he dislikes by interfering in their business operations, launching investigations, threatening to revoke broadcast licenses, and cutting funding for public broadcasting.

In September 2026, Trump barred CNN, MS NOW, and Politico from the White House grounds. The three outlets filed suit, arguing that the ban violated due process and First Amendment protections. The move drew criticism from Republican strategists, who warned that it diverted attention from economic issues ahead of the midterms.

== Issues ==
The lead-up to the elections was marked by an inflation surge amidst affordability concerns, particularly on gas, healthcare, and food prices, exacerbated by the Trump administration's tariffs and Strait of Hormuz crisis caused by the 2026 Iran War. The growth of artificial intelligence became an unexpected issue, with voters concerned about AI-induced mass unemployment, its environmental impacts, mass surveillance, and the risk of human extinction from a hypothetically developed superintelligence.

Income inequality, democratic backsliding, corruption, and foreign policy were frequently cited among voters in exit polling. Trump made threats of annexing multiple countries and used executive orders to change the names of Lake Ontario ("Lake America") and the Gulf of Mexico ("Gulf of America"). Polling by Harvard University found that youth were "deeply concerned about the country's future" and under fiscal stress. Just 9% found the country to be going in a positive direction, a large majority were worried about AI-driven job displacement, 88% labeled endemic corruption in the United States important to their vote, and a plurality believes that they will "be worse off financially than their parents". The Democratic Party leads 63% to 26% among likely voters.

=== Cost of living ===
The economy, including gas prices, inflation, healthcare, tariffs, and cost of living, is one of the primary issues of the election. The second Trump administration imposed the largest tax increase in American history in April 2025, with an expected six trillion dollars in returned taxation if maintained until 2035, on much of the world with the intent to re-industrialize the United States. It was criticized by experts and global leaders for worsening inflation. (Note: Attributed to multiple sources:)

Fuel costs were increased by the 2026 Iran war. The Trump administration announced in October 2026 that it would buy diesel from Russia and suspend sanctions on Russian diesel until April 2027. The move was intended to lower fuel prices before the November elections. A group of seven senators—four Republicans and three Democrats—criticized the decision. They said it violates the 2022 congressional ban on Russian energy imports. They also said the administration neither consulted Congress nor gave the required legal justification. At the same time, Treasury Secretary Scott Bessent defended the agreement, saying the government was acting under existing legal authority and that the deal would reduce prices. Trade, including tariffs, was a leading issue of the campaign season.

Data released on October 14, 2026, by the Bureau of Labor Statistics showed US annual inflation rising to 3.7 per cent in September. That marked an increase from 3.4 per cent in August and exceeded the 3.6 per cent forecast by economists in a Bloomberg poll. It was the first uptick since May. Core inflation, which leaves out food and energy, also surpassed Wall Street expectations, climbing to 2.6 per cent from 2.4 per cent the month before.

=== Inequality and healthcare access ===
Health and income inequality in the United States continued to increase. There is increasing support for a universal healthcare system, with the nation having a far lower lifespan than comparable wealthy countries. The United States is one of a few wealthy democracies without a universal healthcare system. A survey that was conducted by Harvard University found that more than "two-thirds of young Americans (68%) view the power of large corporations as a serious threat to their long-term financial security, while 62% say the same about the wealth and power of billionaires. Concern about corporate power crosses party lines, including 81% of young Democrats, 67% of Independents, and 60% of Republicans. They also wrote on November 3, 2026 that "Support for Medicare for All and a wealth tax points to an economic populist thread that extends beyond young Democrats. Majorities favor creating a national health insurance program (57%) and establishing a 2% annual tax on household wealth above $50 million (54%). Both proposals receive majority support among Democrats (75% and 70%, respectively) and independents (55% and 52%), along with support from roughly four in ten Republicans (39% and 42%)."

=== Corruption ===
Avatar of Donald J. Trump

Donald J. Trump
(@realDonaldTrump)
tweeted:

My NEW Official Trump Meme is HERE! It's time to celebrate everything we stand for: WINNING! Join my very special Trump Community. GET YOUR $TRUMP NOW. Go to gettrumpmemes.com/—Have Fun!

January 17, 2025

According to a September 2026 Gallup poll, 89% of people believe that there is pervasive corruption within the U.S. government. While in office, Trump has engaged in unprecedented self-enrichment and faced widespread allegations of corruption. Trump's grants of pardons and clemency have favored political allies and loyalists, with several given after millions in donations or fees.

Trump has proactively solicited donations from companies and individuals following which favorable regulatory actions and decisions have occurred. He has maintained an active stock market account with thousands of trades totaling hundreds of millions of dollars. Trump has directly benefited by soliciting his own memecoin, $TRUMP and from his family's cryptocurrency company World Liberty Financial which has received investments by anonymous individuals and foreign governments. According to analysis from The New York Times, anonymous political contributions to the midterm elections, known as "dark money", exceeded $1 billion by late August. This funding is funneled into Super PACs through nonprofit organizations and shell companies, allowing donors to remain undisclosed.

=== Democracy ===
The United States has suffered from political dysfunction and immense erosion in democratic health. Polling indicated that voters are afraid of the nation becoming authoritarian. The large majority of Americans favor major changes to the nation's political system, including abolishing the electoral college and replacing it with a direct popular vote, implementing campaign spending limits, and age limits for the Supreme Court of the United States. The Senate has also become a subject for reform, and according to The Week is one of the "most unloved institutions" in the country. The second Trump administration was hallmarked by a massive increase in funding and power for the agencies United States Customs and Border Protection and United States Immigration and Customs Enforcement. The agencies conducted raids throughout mostly Democratic cities, resulting in the killings of protestors Alex Pretti and Renee Good. The government used the Alien Enemies Act to deport both non-citizens and citizens.

=== Artificial intelligence ===
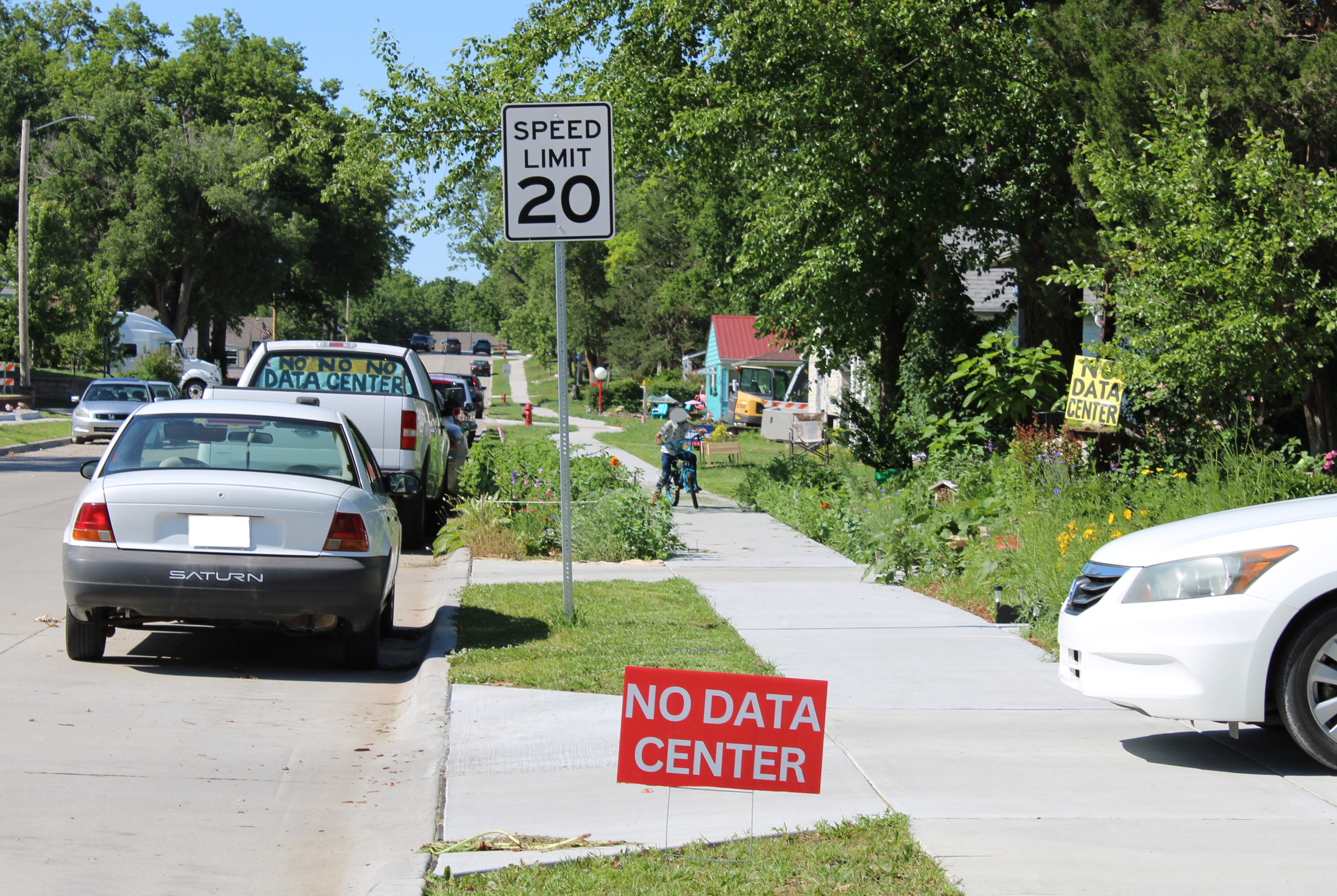
Anti-data-center sentiment on a yard sign in a rural Kansas neighborhood

Artificial intelligence (AI) was a leading concern for voters. Opposition to water, energy, and pollution–intensive data centers, and AI more broadly, emerged as an unexpected issue during the election. (Note: Attributed to multiple sources:) The Brookings Institution described the backlash as part of a broader opposition against "AI power".

Concerns included widespread unemployment through artificial general intelligence's development, imposition of mass surveillance, and the existential risk of superintelligence to humanity. (Note: Attributed to multiple sources:) A bipartisan group in Congress of conservatives, liberals, socialists, and populists has united in opposition to transhumanist and post-humanist ideals in AI development, including Republican senator Josh Hawley, right-wing populist Steve Bannon, Democratic representative Greg Casar, and independent senator Bernie Sanders.

On September 29, 2026, President Trump signed an executive order to replace the term artificial intelligence with super intelligence (SI) in official communications and documents. The order mandates that all government agencies use this terminology, including for technologies that do not fit the accepted definition of superintelligence. According to Harvard, "Nearly two-thirds of young Americans (64%) see AI replacing jobs as a serious threat to their financial security. Concern crosses party lines: 76% of young Democrats and 61% of both Republicans and independents regard it as a serious threat."

==== Data centers ====
A September 2026 poll found that 70% of Americans oppose data center construction in their own communities. AI opposition has occurred across bipartisan lines, described as "sweeping the globe" by Politico. A September 2026 Quinnipac University poll found that 73% of Americans "would oppose the building of an AI data center in their community" while 21% would support it.

==== Mass surveillance ====
A Flock camera on Osceola Parkway, Florida

The Trump administration has implemented mass surveillance in the United States through the development of artificial intelligence technologies. Flock cameras and other video surveillance have been rapidly constructed on American streets since the beginning of his term, with Trump saying that "I like them" in September 2026. There have been arguments made that the U.S. is taking on the characteristics of a surveillance state. Democrats have called for stricter privacy laws modeled on the European Union's General Data Protection Regulation. Republicans have generally believed that mass survelliance improves safety, and that individuals should be willing to give up aspects of privacy in return for protection.

=== Foreign policy ===
==== Expansionism ====
An AI-generated image shared by Donald Trump on Truth Social depicting the United States' closest geographic neighbors under U.S. control, covered in the pattern of the U.S. flag.

Throughout both of his presidencies, U.S. president Donald Trump has expressed a desire to expand the United States' territory and influence through both land purchases and military means. Trump first stated his desire to annex Greenland during his first presidency; he has pursued a campaign to acquire Greenland during his second presidency. He has also suggested annexation or taking control of Canada, Iceland, Mexico, Cuba, the Panama Canal and Gaza Strip. After proposing an invasion of Venezuela during his first presidency, Trump's second administration removed President Nicolás Maduro as part of Operation Absolute Resolve and stated the U.S. would "run" Venezuela; the Venezuelan government, led by acting president Delcy Rodríguez, remains in place but is far more amicable to American interests than it was under Maduro. Threats were also made against Colombia and then-president Gustavo Petro, whom Trump accused of drug trafficking. Amid the 2026 Iran war, Trump has commented about invading and seizing control of both the Strait of Hormuz and Kharg Island from Iran.

Trump's determination to treat the Western Hemisphere as a U.S. sphere of influence has been characterized as a revival of the Monroe Doctrine in what has become known as the Donroe Doctrine. On his orders, U.S. federal agencies adopted new names for shared international waters, renaming the Gulf of Mexico as "Gulf of America" in 2025 and Lake Ontario as "Lake America" in 2026. Deputy Chief of Staff Stephen Miller and Secretary of State Marco Rubio defended the second Trump administration's foreign policy as a matter of operating as a superpower nation and for national security purposes. Numerous politicians outside the U.S. have criticized Trump's annexation comments. The Democratic Party has introduced bills to prevent the Trump administration from invading countries without the approval of Congress.

==== 2026 Iran war ====
A major topic on the election campaign trail was the 2026 Iran war. The war was preceded by the largest US military buildup in the region since the 2003 invasion of Iraq. It resulted in thousands of civilian and military casualties. The economic impact of the war included the largest supply disruption of the global oil market, disruptions of the natural gas, fertilizer, aviation, and tourism industries, and financial volatility. As of October 2026, the US Department of Defense estimated that the war had so far cost $47.1 billion.

American rationale for initiating the war included regime change, preventing Iran from obtaining a nuclear weapon, a response to the massacre of anti-government protesters in Iran, and seizing Iran's resources. Critics have rejected these justifications, stating that the attack is a war of aggression and illegal. Initially setting upon a course to overthrow the Iranian government, later goals focused on nuclear negotiations and reopening the Strait of Hormuz.

Public opinion was mostly opposed to the war in the U.S. and in many other countries, leading to disapproval for Donald Trump and declining views of the US and Israel around the world. Also, according to two polls conducted by Fox News and the Associated Press-NORC between October 8 and 12, 2026, the Iran war has become one of the most important concerns for voters in the midterm elections, surpassing immigration and crime. A Fox News poll showed that 60% of voters opposed US military action against Iran and preferred Democratic congressional candidates. After Republicans' losses in the midterm election, Trump acknowledged that the Iran war had played a role in the defeat.

==== Religious conflicts, rift with the Holy See ====
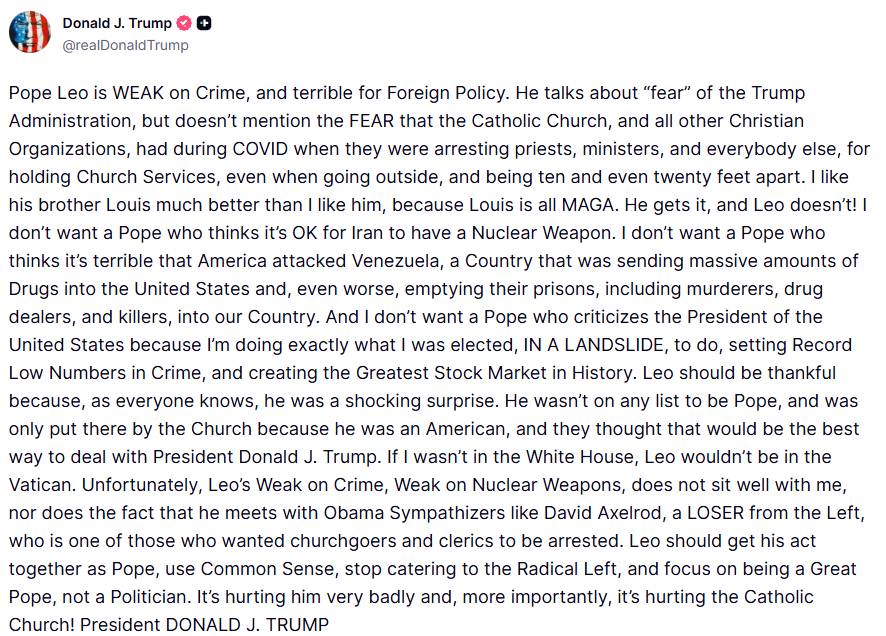
Trump's April 12, 2026, Truth Social post condemning Pope Leo XIV. Hours later, he posted a picture of himself as Jesus.

Since Pope Leo XIV's election as Pope in 2025, the Trump administration has made direct attacks on the Pope, the Catholic Church, and the Holy See that were described by scholars as historically unparalleled by any Western government. The issue saw widespread attention during the election, and Mainline Protestants, Catholics, and evangelical Protestants shifted by double-digits in polling towards Independent and Democratic candidates, alleging that Trump's policies, behavior, and political agenda were in direct contradiction to the tenets of Christian morality.

After genocidal threats were made by President Trump to Iran on April 7 saying "a whole civilization will die", Pope Leo XIV called for peace. On April 12, 2026, Trump directly criticized the pope in a Truth Social post, writing that "Pope Leo is WEAK on Crime, and terrible for Foreign Policy", and "catering to the Radical Left". Marco Politi, a long time Vatican observer and author, stated: "You have to jump back to the Middle Ages when kings and emperors were shouting against the pope in Rome and calling him false. There is just no other recent example like this." Academic Andrew Chestnut stated, "I cannot think of any parallels, at least coming from Western Christian majority countries, of such pointed and public attacks on the Pope."

Another dispute between the Holy See and the Trump administration emerged in the last two weeks of the midterm election, after "12 clergymen joined Trump on Thursday in the Oval Office", for what Archbishop Jeffrey Grob of Milwaukee has said was intended to be a private meeting to discuss matters such as "immigration enforcement, religious worker visas, and human dignity" but was falsely portrayed by the administration as a midterm religious endorsement. Bishop William Joensen of Des Moines said that the meeting had been "exploited" and that "there are many things tied to this present [Trump] Administration that are blatantly at odds with our Catholic faith." Pope Leo XIV, who retained his American citizenship after becoming pontiff, voted by mail in the midterm election for his home state of Illinois, becoming the first pope to vote in a secular election.

== Federal elections ==
=== Senate elections ===
Control of Senate seats by class after the 2026 elections
Class	Democratic	Independent	Republican	Next elections
1	17	2	14	2030
2	21	0	12	2032
3	16	0	18	2028
Total	54	2 (Note: Bernie Sanders and Angus King are Independents but caucus with the Senate Democrats and are counted with them.)	44	—N/a

Thirty-five seats in the United States Senate were up for election, including all 33 Class 2 seats. Republicans had gained majority control of the Senate in the 2024 elections by flipping four Democratic seats. Although Republicans had to defend 22 of the 35 seats up for election, all but two of those seats (in Maine and North Carolina) were in states that President Trump won by at least ten points in the 2024 presidential election. Two Democratic-held seats up for election, Georgia and Michigan, were in states won by Trump in 2024.

Democrats won control of the Senate in 2026, defending every Democratic-held seat up for election and picking up several seats in Republican-leaning territory. They picked up a total of nine seats, the largest net gains by Senate Democrats since the 1958 elections. Democrat Scott Colom's victory made him the first Black senator to represent Mississippi since Blanche Bruce won election in 1874. Adam Hamilton became the first Democrat to win a Senate election in Kansas since 1932, while James Talarico of Texas, Annie Andrews of South Carolina, Sherrod Brown of Ohio, Josh Turek of Iowa, Jon Ossoff of Georgia, Abdul El-Sayed of Michigan, Roy Cooper of North Carolina, and Mary Peltola of Alaska all won Senate seats in states that Trump had won in 2024. Reacting to these victories, New York Times political analyst Nate Cohn said "there's simply no modern precedent for either party to do so well in states that had leaned so heavily toward the other side", highlighting Democratic victories in Kansas and Texas as especially significant due to their traditional Republican lean. Additionally, in Maine, Democrat Troy Jackson defeated five-term incumbent Susan Collins.

==== Special elections ====
Two special elections were held to fill the unexpired terms of senators who vacated their seats during the 119th Congress:

- Florida Class 3: Republican Marco Rubio resigned his seat on January 20, 2025, to become U.S. secretary of state under the second Trump administration. Ashley Moody was appointed by Florida governor Ron DeSantis to fill the seat until the special election, which took place concurrently with the regularly scheduled 2026 elections. Moody won the special election.
- Ohio Class 3: Republican JD Vance resigned his seat on January 10, 2025, following his election as vice president of the United States. Jon Husted was appointed by Ohio governor Mike DeWine to fill the seat until the special election, which took place concurrently with the regularly scheduled 2026 elections. Husted was defeated by Sherrod Brown.

=== House of Representatives elections ===
All 435 voting seats in the United States House of Representatives were up for election. Additionally, elections were held to select the non-voting delegate for the District of Columbia and the non-voting delegates from 4 of the 5 U.S. territories, excluding Puerto Rico due to its non-voting delegate serving a 4-year term. There were 16 Democratic incumbents in districts Donald Trump won, while only 8 Republican incumbents were in seats won by Harris. The House map featured a number of new congressional maps: Ohio and Utah had new, court-mandated congressional districts this cycle; North Carolina and Texas redrew their maps mid-cycle; and the district map was changed in California following the passage of Prop 50. Missouri Republicans also sought to implement a new congressional map, but their effort failed after a long-running legal battle through state and federal court systems.

Democrats won control of the House of Representatives in 2026, winning numerous races across the country, including in districts that had voted for Trump by a large margin in 2024. Several races remain uncalled, but Democrats won at least 250 seats, their highest total since the Republican victory in the 2010 House of Representatives elections. Democrats won the cumulative popular vote for the House of Representatives by fourteen points, the largest margin for either party since the 1974 elections. The party picked up a net of at least two seats in each of Arizona, California, Colorado, Iowa, Michigan, Ohio, New Jersey, North Carolina, Pennsylvania, Virginia, and Wisconsin. Among the defeated Republican incumbents were National Republican Congressional Committee (NRCC) Chair Richard Hudson of North Carolina, the first sitting NRCC chairman to ever be defeated in a general election.

==== Special elections ====
Six special elections to the House of Representatives were held in 2026.

- Texas's 18th congressional district: Democrat Christian Menefee defeated fellow Democrat Amanda Edwards in a runoff to succeed Democrat Sylvester Turner, who died on March 5, 2025. The district has a partisan index of D+21.
- Georgia's 14th congressional district: Republican Clay Fuller defeated Democrat Shawn Harris in a runoff to succeed Republican Marjorie Taylor Greene, who resigned on January 5, 2026. The district has a partisan index of R+19.
- New Jersey's 11th congressional district: Democrat Analilia Mejia defeated Republican Joe Hathaway to succeed Democrat Mikie Sherrill, who resigned on November 20, 2025, to take office as governor of New Jersey. The district has a partisan index of D+5.
- California's 1st congressional district: Republican James Gallagher defeated Democrats Audrey Denney and Mike McGuire to succeed Republican Doug LaMalfa, who died on January 6, 2026. The district has a partisan index of R+12.
- California's 14th congressional district: Democrat Aisha Wahab defeated fellow Democrat Melissa Hernandez in a runoff to succeed Democrat Eric Swalwell, who resigned on April 14, 2026, following accusations of sexual misconduct. The district has a partisan index of D+20.
- Georgia's 13th congressional district: Democrat Everton Blair defeated fellow Democrat Marcye Scott in a runoff to succeed Democrat David Scott, who died on April 22, 2026. This district has a partisan index of D+21.

=== Generic congressional ballot aggregate polls ===
Source of poll aggregation	Dates administered	Dates updated	Republicans	Democrats	Other/ Undecided (Note: Calculated by taking the difference of 100% and all other candidates combined)	Margin
Decision Desk HQ	January 9, 2025 – November 1, 2026	November 3, 2026	42.8%	51.4%	5.8%	Democrats +8.6%
FiftyPlusOne	January 9, 2025 – November 1, 2026	November 3, 2026	44.1%	52.8%	3.1%	Democrats +8.6%
NBC News	January 9, 2025 – November 1, 2026	November 3, 2026	44.0%	52.0%	4.0%	Democrats +8.0%
RealClearPolitics	October 9 – November 1, 2026	November 3, 2026	43.3%	52.1%	4.6%	Democrats +8.8%
Silver Bulletin	January 9, 2025 – November 1, 2026	November 3, 2026	43.0%	51.8%	5.2%	Democrats +8.8%
Average		November 3, 2026	43.4%	52.0%	4.6%	Democrats +8.6%

== State elections ==
Partisan control of state governments following the 2026 elections: Democratic trifecta maintained Republican trifecta maintained Democratic trifecta established Divided government established Divided government maintained Officially non-partisan, unicameral legislature TBD

Lieutenant gubernatorial elections Democratic hold Democratic gain Republican hold No election

Attorney general elections Democratic hold Democratic gain Republican hold Nonpartisan No election

Secretary of state elections Democratic hold Democratic gain Republican hold No election

Treasurer elections Democratic hold Democratic gain Republican hold No election

Auditor elections Democratic hold Democratic gain Republican hold Republican gain No election

=== Gubernatorial elections ===
Thirty-six states and three territories held regularly scheduled gubernatorial elections. The governors of 15 states and two territories were term-limited. Prior to the 2026 gubernatorial elections, Republicans controlled 26 of the 50 state governorships, and each party held 18 state governorships up for election. Republicans had held a majority of the state governorships since the 2010 elections.

Democrats defended all of their own seats and won a series of victories in Republican-leaning states, resulting in Democrats holding a total of 30 gubernatorial seats and governing three-quarters of the United States population, representing a jump from 57 percent prior to the elections. Democrats swept every statewide race in Texas, with Gina Hinojosa becoming the first Democrat to win the Texas gubernatorial election since the 1990 Texas gubernatorial election. Keisha Lance Bottoms and Jonathan Kreiss-Tomkins became the first Democrats since 1998 to win gubernatorial elections in Georgia and Alaska, respectively. Amy Acton in Ohio and Rob Sand in Iowa became the first Democrats to win their respective states since the 2006 elections. In Nevada, Democrat Aaron Ford defeated Joe Lombardo, ending four years of Republican control of the office. One major exception to Democratic gains was the state of Florida, where Republicans retained majorities in the state legislature and Republican Byron Donalds won the gubernatorial election. Republicans Phil Scott of Vermont and Kelly Ayotte of New Hampshire also won re-election despite representing states that had voted for Kamala Harris in 2024.

=== Other statewide executive elections ===
Thirty states, two territories, and one federal district held regularly scheduled attorney general elections; and Democratic candidates flipped partisan control of the office in Iowa, Georgia, Kansas, and Texas. 26 states held regularly scheduled secretary of state elections; and Democrats flipped partisan control of the office in Georgia, Indiana, and Ohio. Beau Bayh and Jessica Bailey became the first Democrats to win a statewide election in Indiana since 2012. 27 states held regularly scheduled treasurer elections. 23 states held regularly scheduled auditor elections. Ten states held lieutenant gubernatorial elections independently from their gubernatorial elections; and Democrats picked up seats in Nevada, Texas, Georgia, and Vermont. In total, at least 28 statewide offices flipped to the Democrats, with nearly all of them located in the South and the Great Plains, while the Republicans only flipped one, the South Carolina State Comptroller.

=== Legislative elections ===
Democrats made major gains across the country, picking up over 500 state legislative seats, the largest shift since the 2010 elections. Democrats flipped at least one legislative chamber each in Arizona, Michigan, Minnesota, Pennsylvania, and Wisconsin, gaining trifectas in each state. They also gained a trifecta in Nevada by winning the gubernatorial race and retaining control of both of Nevada's legislative chambers. Democrats broke Republican trifectas in Georgia and Texas by winning the governorship and lower house in each state, and broke the Republican trifecta in New Hampshire by winning both chambers of the state legislature. Democrats also won a majority in the North Carolina House of Representatives.

Additionally, the Democrats ended Republican supermajorities in Arkansas, Florida, Indiana, Kansas, Missouri, North Carolina, Ohio, South Carolina, and Utah. Democrats also expanded their majorities in Democratic-leaning states; in the New York State Senate, they gained their largest legislative majority since 1846, and Democrats gained the largest supermajorities in the California State Legislature in the state's history.

Eighty-eight state legislative chambers and 5 territorial chambers held regularly scheduled elections. Prior to the regularly-scheduled 2026 state legislative elections, Republicans held 4,044 state legislative seats, while Democrats held 3,227 state legislative seats. Republicans had controlled a majority of the legislative chambers and seats since the 2010 elections.

=== State judicial elections ===
Elections were held in 2026, in various states across the country, including appellate courts and courts of last resort. Democrats and left-leaning candidates performed well in several judicial races, including sweeping all four seats up for election on the Supreme Court of Texas.

=== Ballot measures ===
One hundred ballot measures in 37 states were held in the November election. Among the various ballot measures proposed, four states passed measures to prohibit transgender athletes from competing on female sports teams, Maryland voters approved an amendment favored by Democratic leaders easing requirements for congressional redistricting, and Missouri voters rejected a Republican-favored congressional redistricting plan.

== Local elections ==
Local elections were held in the United States throughout 2026 to elect officers of municipal and county governments. At least 22 mayorships in the country's top 100 most populous cities were up for election, and many more held elections for local ballot measures, city council, and numerous other municipal offices. Many of these races coincided with the 2026 midterm elections.

== Table of state, territorial, and federal results ==
This table shows the partisan results of congressional, gubernatorial, and state legislative races held in each state and territory in 2026. Note that not all states and territories hold gubernatorial, state legislative, and Senate elections in 2026, and some seats in the U.S. House of Representatives were vacant at the time of the regularly-scheduled 2026 elections. The five territories and Washington, D.C. do not elect members of the Senate; instead, they each elect one non-voting member of the House. Nebraska's unicameral legislature and the governorship and the legislature of American Samoa are elected on a non-partisan basis, and political party affiliation is not listed.

State/Territory	2026 PVI	Before 2026 elections				After 2026 elections			
State/Territory	2026 PVI	Governor	State leg.	U.S. Senate	U.S. House	Governor	State leg.	U.S. Senate	U.S. House
Alabama	R+15	Rep	Rep	Rep	Rep 5–2	Rep	Rep	Rep	Rep 5–2
Alaska	R+6	Rep	Coalition (Note: Both of Alaska's legislative chambers are led by a bipartisan coalition.)	Rep	Rep 1–0	Dem	Coalition	Split	Rep 1-0
Arizona	R+2	Dem	Rep	Dem	Rep 6–3	Dem	Dem	Dem	Dem 5–4
Arkansas	R+15	Rep	Rep	Rep	Rep 4–0	Rep	Rep	Rep	Rep 4–0
California	D+12	Dem	Dem	Dem	Dem 43–8–1	Dem	Dem	Dem	Dem 48–4
Colorado	D+6	Dem	Dem	Dem	Split 4–4	Dem	Dem	Dem	Dem 7–1
Connecticut	D+8	Dem	Dem	Dem	Dem 5–0	Dem	Dem	Dem	Dem 5–0
Delaware	D+8	Dem	Dem	Dem	Dem 1–0	Dem	Dem	Dem	Dem 1–0
Florida	R+5	Rep	Rep	Rep	Rep 20–8	Rep	Rep	Rep	Rep 20–8
Georgia	R+1	Rep	Rep	Dem	Rep 9–5	Dem	Split	Dem	Rep 9–5
Hawaii	D+13	Dem	Dem	Dem	Dem 2–0	Dem	Dem	Dem	Dem 2–0
Idaho	R+18	Rep	Rep	Rep	Rep 2–0	Rep	Rep	Rep	Rep 2–0
Illinois	D+6	Dem	Dem	Dem	Dem 14–3	Dem	Dem	Dem	Dem 14–3
Indiana	R+9	Rep	Rep	Rep	Rep 7–2	Rep	Rep	Rep	Rep 6–3
Iowa	R+6	Rep	Rep	Rep	Rep 4–0	Dem	Rep	Split	Dem 3–1
Kansas	R+8	Dem	Rep	Rep	Rep 3–1	Dem	Rep	Split	Rep 3–1
Kentucky	R+15	Dem	Rep	Rep	Rep 5–1	Dem	Rep	Rep	Rep 4–2
Louisiana	R+11	Rep	Rep	Rep	Rep 4–2	Rep	Rep	Rep	TBD (Note: A December 12 runoff election will determine the winner in LA-5 and LA-6)
Maine	D+4	Dem	Dem	Split R/I (Note: One of Maine's senators, Susan Collins, is a Republican. The other senator from Maine, Angus King, is an independent who has caucused with Democrats since taking office in 2013.)	Dem 2–0	Dem	Dem	Split D/I (Note: Maine's senator-elect, Troy Jackson, is a Democrat. The other senator from Maine, Angus King, is an independent who has caucused with Democrats since taking office in 2013.)	Split 1–1
Maryland	D+15	Dem	Dem	Dem	Dem 7–1	Dem	Dem	Dem	Dem 7–1
Massachusetts	D+14	Dem	Dem	Dem	Dem 9–0	Dem	Dem	Dem	Dem 9–0
Michigan	EVEN	Dem	Split	Dem	Rep 7–6	Dem	Dem	Dem	Dem 9–4
Minnesota	D+3	Dem	Split	Dem	Split 4–4	Dem	Dem	Dem	Dem 5–3
Mississippi	R+11	Rep	Rep	Rep	Rep 3–1	Rep	Rep	Split	Rep 3–1
Missouri	R+9	Rep	Rep	Rep	Rep 6–2	Rep	Rep	Rep	Rep 5–3
Montana	R+10	Rep	Rep	Rep	Rep 2–0	Rep	Rep	Rep	Split 1–1
Nebraska	R+10	Rep	NP (Note: While the unicameral Nebraska Legislature is officially nonpartisan, it is led by the Republican caucus.)	Rep	Rep 3–0	Rep	NP	Rep	Rep 2–1
Nevada	R+1	Rep	Dem	Dem	Dem 3–1	Dem	Dem	Dem	Dem 4–0
New Hampshire	D+2	Rep	Rep	Dem	Dem 2–0	Rep	Dem	Dem	Dem 2–0
New Jersey	D+4	Dem	Dem	Dem	Dem 9–3	Dem	Dem	Dem	Dem 11–1
New Mexico	D+4	Dem	Dem	Dem	Dem 3–0	Dem	Dem	Dem	Dem 3–0
New York	D+8	Dem	Dem	Dem	Dem 19–7	Dem	Dem	Dem	Dem 20–6
North Carolina	R+1	Dem	Rep	Rep	Rep 10–4	Dem	Split	Split	Dem 11–3
North Dakota	R+18	Rep	Rep	Rep	Rep 1–0	Rep	Rep	Rep	Rep 1–0
Ohio	R+5	Rep	Rep	Rep	Rep 10–5	Dem	Rep	Split	Dem 8–7
Oklahoma	R+17	Rep	Rep	Rep	Rep 5–0	Rep	Rep	Rep	Rep 5–0
Oregon	D+8	Dem	Dem	Dem	Dem 5–1	Dem	Dem	Dem	Dem 5–1
Pennsylvania	R+1	Dem	Split	Split	Rep 10–7	Dem	Dem	Split	Dem 11–6
Rhode Island	D+8	Dem	Dem	Dem	Dem 2–0	Dem	Dem	Dem	Dem 2–0
South Carolina	R+8	Rep	Rep	Rep	Rep 6–1	Rep	Rep	Split	Rep 5–2
South Dakota	R+15	Rep	Rep	Rep	Rep 1–0	Rep	Rep	Rep	Rep 1–0
Tennessee	R+14	Rep	Rep	Rep	Rep 8–1	Rep	Rep	Rep	Rep 8–1
Texas	R+6	Rep	Rep	Rep	Rep 24–13	Dem	Split	Split	Rep 24–14
Utah	R+11	Rep	Rep	Rep	Rep 4–0	Rep	Rep	Rep	Rep 3–1
Vermont	D+17	Rep	Dem	Split D/I (Note: One of Vermont's senators, Peter Welch, is a Democrat. The other senator from Vermont, Bernie Sanders, was elected as an independent and has caucused with Democrats since taking office in 2007.)	Dem 1–0	Rep	Dem	Split D/I	Dem 1–0
Virginia	D+3	Dem	Dem	Dem	Dem 6–5	Dem	Dem	Dem	Dem 8–3
Washington	D+10	Dem	Dem	Dem	Dem 8–2	Dem	Dem	Dem	Dem 8–2
West Virginia	R+21	Rep	Rep	Rep	Rep 2–0	Rep	Rep	Rep	Rep 2–0
Wisconsin	EVEN	Dem	Rep	Split	Rep 6–2	Dem	Dem	Split	Split 4–4
Wyoming	R+23	Rep	Rep	Rep	Rep 1–0	Rep	Rep	Rep	Rep 1–0
United States	EVEN	Rep	Rep	Rep	Rep	Dem	Dem	Dem	Dem
Washington, D.C.	D+44	Dem (Note: The federal district does not have a governor or state legislature but elects the mayor of Washington, D.C., the Council of the District of Columbia, and a non-voting delegate to the House of Representatives.)	Dem	—N/a	Dem	Dem	Dem	—N/a	Dem
American Samoa	—N/a	NP (Note: Although elections for governor of American Samoa are non-partisan, Governor Pula Nikolao Pula affiliates with the Republican Party.)	NP (Note: While the bicameral American Samoa Fono is officially nonpartisan, independents hold a majority in both chambers. House Speaker Savali Talavou Ale is affiliated with the Republican party.)	—N/a	Rep	NP	NP	—N/a	Rep
Guam	—N/a	Dem	Rep	—N/a	Rep	Rep	Rep	—N/a	Dem
N. Mariana Islands	—N/a	Ind	Coalition	—N/a	Rep	TBD (Note: A November 20 runoff will determine the winner.)	TBD	—N/a	Rep
Puerto Rico	—N/a	PNP/R (Note: Governor of Puerto Rico Jenniffer González-Colón is a member of the New Progressive Party, but affiliates with the Republican Party at the national level.)	PNP	—N/a	PDP/D (Note: Resident commissioner of Puerto Rico Pablo Hernández Rivera is a member of the Popular Democratic Party, but affiliates with the Democratic Party at the national level.)	PNP/R	PNP	—N/a	PDP/D
U.S. Virgin Islands	—N/a	Dem	Dem	—N/a	Dem	Dem	Dem	—N/a	Dem
State/Territory	2026 PVI	Governor	State leg.	U.S. Senate	U.S. House	Governor	State leg.	U.S. Senate	U.S. House
State/Territory	2026 PVI	Before 2026 elections				After 2026 elections			

== Polling ==
=== Exit polling ===
==== Age ====
Age range (with percentage of polled voters)	Democratic voting share	Republican voting share	Other/third party
18–29 (11%)	73%	25%	2%
30–44 (20%)	62%	36%	2%
45–64 (34%)	52%	46%	2%
65 or over (36%)	50%	50%	Near 0

==== Education ====
Which best describes your education?	Democratic voting share	Republican voting share	Other/third party
Not a high school graduate (2%)	50%	49%	1%
High school graduate (21%)	44%	54%	2%
Attended college but received no degree (19%)	50%	48%	2%
Associate's degree (AA or AS) (11%)	49%	49%	2%
Bachelor's degree (BA or BS) (27%)	60%	38%	2%
Advanced degree after a bachelor's degree (such as MA, MBA, JD, MD, PhD) (20%)	68%	31%	1%

==== Race ====
Are you:	Democratic voting share	Republican voting share	Other/third party
White (73%)	49%	49%	2%
Latino (10%)	64%	34%	2%
Black (9%)	90%	9%	1%
Asian (4%)	71%	28%	1%
Other (5%)	54%	43%	3%

==== Religion ====
Are you:	Democratic voting share	Republican voting share	Other/third party
Protestant or other Christian (40%)	39%	60%	1%
Catholic (20%)	50%	49%	1%
Something else (10%)	65%	33%	2%
Jewish (3%)	68%	31%	1%
None (27%)	78%	20%	2%

=== Issues ===
==== Artificial intelligence ====
Thinking about your vote for Congress, how important to you was artificial intelligence (AI) and data centers?	Democratic voting share	Republican voting share	Other/third party
Crucial or a major factor (56%)	66%	33%	1%
A minor factor or not a factor (44%)	43%	56%	1%

Would you favor or oppose the construction of a new data center in your community?	Democratic voting share	Republican voting share	Other/third party
Oppose (76%)	64%	34%	2%
Favor (24%)	28%	71%	1%

Do you think artificial intelligence (AI) will:	Democratic voting share	Republican voting share	Other/third party
Do more to hurt society (57%)	63%	35%	2%
Neither help nor hurt (18%)	52%	46%	2%
Do more to help society (24%)	39%	60%	1%

==== Cost of living ====
When it comes to your personal financial situation, how concerned are you about the cost of food and groceries?	Democratic voting share	Republican voting share	Other/third party
Very concerned (59%)	68%	30%	2%
Somewhat concerned (30%)	42%	57%	1%
Not too concerned (9%)	23%	76%	1%
Not at all concerned (2%)	29%	70%	1%

==== Corruption ====
Thinking about your vote for Congress, how important to you was government corruption?	Democratic voting share	Republican voting share	Other/third party
Crucial (55%)	63%	35%	2%
A major factor (36%)	49%	50%	1%
A minor factor (8%)	36%	63%	1%
Not a factor (2%)	25%	72%	3%

==== Democracy ====
Do you think Congress is doing too much, not enough, or about the right amount to provide checks and balances on the presidency?	Democratic voting share	Republican voting share	Other/third party
Not enough (71%)	75%	24%	1%
About the right amount (20%)	5%	94%	1%
Too much (9%)	8%	90%	2%

==== Foreign policy ====
Regardless of who you support, which party would you say is better able to handle foreign policy?	Democratic voting share	Republican voting share	Other/third party
Democratic Party (45%)	96%	3%	1%
Republican Party (38%)	5%	94%	1%
Neither (17%)	58%	36%	6%

==== Inequality ====
Do you think the U.S. economic system generally	Democratic voting share	Republican voting share	Other/third party
Favors the wealthy (70%)	76%	22%	2%
Is fair to most Americans (30%)	7%	92%	1%

== Elections by state or territory ==
- Alabama
- Alaska
- Arizona
- Arkansas
- California
- Colorado
- Connecticut
- Delaware
- District of Columbia
- Florida
- Georgia
- Guam
- Hawaii
- Idaho
- Illinois
- Indiana
- Iowa
- Kansas
- Kentucky
- Louisiana
- Maine
- Maryland
- Massachusetts
- Michigan
- Minnesota
- Mississippi
- Missouri
- Montana
- Nebraska
- Nevada
- New Hampshire
- New Jersey
- New Mexico
- New York
- North Carolina
- North Dakota
- Northern Mariana Islands
- Ohio
- Oklahoma
- Oregon
- Pennsylvania
- Rhode Island
- South Carolina
- South Dakota
- Tennessee
- Texas
- Utah
- Vermont
- Virginia
- Washington
- West Virginia
- Wisconsin
- Wyoming

== Analysis ==
The results were labeled a rebuke of President Trump, Trumpism, (Note: Attributed to multiple sources:) and further AI development. (Note: Attributed to multiple sources:) Analysts called the election results "a fundamental realignment" in American politics unparalleled since the post-Watergate Era. NBC News, NPR, and Texas senator Ted Cruz dubbed the results a "blue tsunami". Axios said that "Make no mistake: Democrats won by epic, sometimes historic margins across red and blue states, up and down ballots, obliterating almost everything President Trump, and a Republican Party remade wholly in his image, built over the past decade in American politics." Democrats won the largest popular-vote victory in the House of Representatives since 1976.

Peter Baker called it "the beginning of the end to the Trump era", while The New York Times said that it left Trump as "a lame duck with two years left to fight". Fox News's Sean Hannity, a prominent Trump supporter, said: "Hatred is a hell of a motivator. I think the hatred for this man [Trump] is unprecedented. I've never seen anything like it." NBC News reported the Democratic Party "won historic electoral victories Tuesday night on a pledge to make life more affordable for Americans, an issue that united voters across political and demographic divides" and the "stunning electoral results on Tuesday night were the culmination of a months long effort by Democrats to make the high cost of living a central campaign issue in races across the country up and down the ballot". NBC News exit polls found that 70% believed that Congress was not doing "enough to provide checks and balances on the presidency" and that the U.S. economic system generally "favors the wealthy". 69% of voters believed the country's economic system favors the wealthy, while only 31% said it is generally fair. A majority predicted that life for the next generation of Americans would be worse and that AI was likely to "do more to hurt society" than help. Most said that the cost of living (89%), the war in Iran, government corruption, ICE, and data centers/AI (56%) were "crucial or a major factor" to their vote. Throughout the campaign, Democrats and their supporters expressed more enthusiasm for voting than Republicans and their base. An October 2026 Gallup poll found that 58% of Democrats and Democratic-leaning independents, compared to 48% of Republicans and Republican-leaning independents, said that they were more motivated to vote than usual.

Centrist and center-right Democrats increased their influence in the Democratic caucus, driven by unexpected gains in the South, which has a comparably more right-leaning electoral base than most of the country. An NPR analysis found that there was differential turnout in six Southern states: Alabama, Georgia, Louisiana, Mississippi, North Carolina, and South Carolina. In those states, turnout in counties or county-equivalents won by Kamala Harris in 2024 dropped by 19%, while turnout in counties or county-equivalents won by Trump in 2024 dropped by 26%. Those six states swung an average of 22 points towards the Democrats, larger than the nationwide swing of 14.5 points, resulting in them flipping Senate seats in the Carolinas and Mississippi and making the Senate seat in Louisiana competitive. NPR attributed this to a surge in Black voter participation, partially spurred by the Louisiana v. Callais decision; counties with majority-Black populations overall had higher voter turnout of about 85% compared to 76% for counties with White, non-Hispanic majority populations. According to the American Communities Project (ACP), a Michigan State University-based social science research lab, turnout rates among White evangelical voters, a key Republican constituency, declined significantly from 2024. The ACP measured turnout in 343 counties across the Southeastern United States, all of which had high concentrations of self-described White evangelicals, at 66% of 2024 turnout. In contrast, turnout in the surrounding counties was recorded at 78% of 2024 turnout, indicating lower enthusiasm in White evangelical areas. Nearly all Republican efforts to gain new seats through mid-decade redistricting failed to produce their intended effects, with North Carolina in particular unintentionally producing a Democratic majority in the state's congressional delegation.

Progressives on the center-left also won due to the size of the wave election. The election marked a shift away from pro-Israel candidates, with 21 out of the 26 candidates with more than $100,000 in backing by AIPAC losing their races. Over 30 pastors ran as Democrats in the 2026 election, and Reuters and The New Republic said that many Democrat candidates in tight races took moderate or socially conservative positions on issues such as energy, immigration and transgender people in sports. In The Nation, Eric Blanc said that left-wing economic themes had become mainstream, with 78% of Democratic Senate candidates referencing billionaires in their campaign websites, up from 19% in 2024. Similarly, The New York Times said that both centrist and progressive Democrats had embraced economic populism, noting that "there is broad agreement among many of the newly elected members on ... cutting costs and combating corruption."

A Gallup poll from October 2026 found that the economy, healthcare and the Iran war lead in importance to voters. An exit poll by SSRS found the economy and the state of democracy to be the most important issues. Other factors included concern over data centers. NBC News said: "Voters across the country delivered a sweeping rebuke to data center development." They near-unanimously approved measures to slow or ban the growth of AI data centers. Candidates "who tapped into voter fears about artificial intelligence and data centers won big".

=== Potential impact on 2028 presidential election ===
In the days following the midterms, speculation began to arise about the possibility of enough states joining the National Popular Vote Interstate Compact in time for it to take effect in the 2028 United States presidential election. The compact was first introduced in 2006, and entails states passing laws requiring the awarding of their electoral votes to the presidential ticket which wins the national vote composed of all 50 states and the District of Columbia. As of the day of the midterm elections, states representing 222 electoral votes had joined the compact, which takes effect only when the number of electoral votes held by states part of the compact reaches a majority of at least 270.

The National News Desk identified Arizona, Michigan, Nevada, Pennsylvania, and Wisconsin as five states where Democrats had won trifectas and could potentially join the compact before 2028, after Virginia became the most recent state to join in April following Democratic victories there in 2025. Pennsylvania Governor Josh Shapiro, who is seen as a potential presidential contender himself, stated "the national popular vote makes sense", while in Wisconsin, Governor-elect David Crowley said "we can do away with" the Electoral College. Wisconsin State Senator Kelda Roys also said "there is no other election in this country where the person who loses can win the election, where the person who gets the most votes doesn't actually win." In Nevada, Governor-elect Aaron Ford was originally opposed to the compact, but changed his mind following the election after doing more research.

== Domestic reactions ==
=== Reactions by Trump and other Republicans ===
Trump and Republicans made false claims of widespread voter fraud leading up to the elections, but ultimately accepted the results. On Truth Social, President Trump said: "I wasn't on the Ballot and if I was, we would have won IN A LANDSLIDE!" He repeated this to CBS News, where he also congratulated Democrats, saying, "I look forward to working with you for the good of our country." Donald Trump acknowledged after the midterm elections that the Iran war was a factor in Republican losses. He told Fox News that he would veto any "insane" bills Democrats attempt to pass, adding that he would still work together to create compromises. Some White House officials and Republican allies also called the war a mistake and said that if the conflict had ended sooner, the results of the midterm elections could have been different.

Trump also said in an interview with CBS's 60 Minutes on November 8, 2026, that "great dislike" towards Israel, public opposition to war with Iran, and rising gas prices were among the main reasons for the Republicans' defeat. In addition, Trump said his immigration policies "both helped and hurt" and said his deportation policy "was too tough", while adding that he would "love to do something on immigration" with congressional Democrats. Trump nonetheless announced the same day that he was replacing his chief of staff Susie Wiles with immigration hardliner Stephen Miller. On November 9, 2026, Trump said on Truth Social: "Does anybody really believe that this 'Election' was honest. How could the Polls be so wrong???" He also objected to the volume of early-voting ballots and said that voting machines are more important than the voter.

Vice President JD Vance blamed the Iran war for the results and added, "If you'd like to argue it was worth it, that losing the Senate for the next 6 years was worth it, then do so. Argue it was a worthwhile cost to pay. Agree or disagree, that's at least honest." Vance said that voters want to "change our relationship to Israel".

Florida Governor Ron DeSantis called the election an "extinction-level" event for Republicans, criticizing his party on a range of issues ranging from how they handled the Epstein files to members of the party in Congress trading stocks, while also lamenting how Democrats outflanked Republicans on the issue of regulating AI and tech companies, suggesting "corporatist Republicans" were to blame for pushing rural and young voters towards Democrats. Nonetheless, he celebrated how Republicans performed in his own state, where they won a clean sweep of Florida statewide offices, and also passed a cut to property taxes via referendum.

==== Proposals to limit incoming Democrats' power ====
Republican politicians in several states where Democrats were elected to key statewide offices have proposed enacting measures in lame-duck sessions to curtail incoming Democrats' powers. In Texas, outgoing lieutenant governor Dan Patrick called on the Texas Senate to limit his Democratic successor Vikki Goodwin's powers within the chamber, where the lieutenant governor of Texas has historically wielded a strong influence in comparison to other states. State representative Brian Harrison also called for a special session to remove "emergency powers" from the Texas governorship before Democrat Gina Hinojosa assumes the office. Hinojosa responded to such calls saying "the people of Texas have spoken, and I think it's important that as elected leaders we respect what the people of Texas have said."

Following Democrat Amy Acton's victory in Ohio's gubernatorial race, Republicans in the state's legislature introduced a joint-resolution to reduce the threshold needed for a veto-override to a simple majority. The measure would ultimately need to be approved by voters in the state in a referendum after passing the state legislature by a 3/5 majority vote. In Iowa, speculation of Republicans calling a special session was shot down in the immediate term by State House Republican leader Pat Grassley, while in Georgia, Governor Brian Kemp also stated he had no intention of calling a special session to limit executive powers or enact redistricting, saying "the voters of our state have spoken."

=== Reactions by Democratic politicians ===
Robert Garcia, who is set to chair the House Oversight Committee, issued a statement on November 3 telling Republicans to "lawyer up" after they were defeated in the elections. Garcia had previously said that in the event of a Democratic victory, he would conduct investigations into Elon Musk's role in the Department of Government Efficiency (DOGE), the Trump family's business activities, abuses by US Immigration and Customs Enforcement (ICE), and the Jeffrey Epstein scandal.

Former President Barack Obama said that the election's results showed that the American people want "a politics that brings people together rather than divides them" and leaders offering concrete solutions to their problems. Former Vice President Kamala Harris said "now the work begins", and called on Democrats at all levels of government to be "ruthless" in exercising power, adding "the people demand nothing less".

Kentucky Governor Andy Beshear, who chaired the Democratic Governors Association during the 2026 elections and led the organization's support for gubernatorial campaigns, celebrated the fact that Democrats are now set to have a governor in "every single swing state", and noted he was particularly excited about the election of Keisha Lance Bottoms in Georgia, where she will be the first black woman to serve as governor of a U.S. state.

Pennsylvania Governor Josh Shapiro, who won re-election himself by a landslide margin, urged Democrats in Congress to prioritize healthcare and food assistance. Looking ahead to 2028, he also said in an interview with Meet the Press that "no question, people are lining up to run" against Senator John Fetterman in the Democratic primary for Senate, while noting Pennsylvanians had shown with their votes that they "don't want people enabling President Trump anymore".

Pete Buttigieg, who served as Transportation Secretary under former President Joe Biden, called the results an "unbelievable rejection" of the Republican Party in an interview with NBC News on the night of the election, adding "President Trump told people to vote as if he were on the ballot. I think the American people did, and sent an extremely powerful message." Asked about Garcia's "lawyer up" remarks, Buttigieg stated Democrats would be focused first and foremost on affordability issues, but also said that there needed to be "accountability" for corruption.

Congresswoman Alexandria Ocasio-Cortez said the midterms result "widens the scope of what is possible", suggesting Democrats should pass policies such as Medicare for All and abolition of the Electoral College. In an Instagram video, she also accused the party's leadership of starving funds from left-wing candidates, citing Angie Nixon's loss in Florida, saying if Nixon "had just had a little bit of that support, that outcome could have changed." Asked later on by The Hill about her own plans for 2028, Ocasio-Cortez replied "the last thing that people want to hear from me or any other politician here is about the next election."

=== Reactions by prominent media figures ===
In a post on X, Republican megadonor Elon Musk quipped "guess my election interfering space lasers didn't work this time", with an added screenshot featuring the caption "Sorry! We are experiencing technical difficulties". The post was in part a reference to the 2026 documentary Musk, where Musk's ex-partner Ashley St. Clair alleged that he had interfered in elections in 2024 via Starlink. On November 18, in an interview with The New York Times, Musk walked back his earlier support for Trump and Republicans, saying he felt "pretty foolish" about spending so much money on their campaigns and adding that he is "not MAGA" and "quite moderate" in his beliefs, while also suggesting he is not worried about the effect Governor-elect Gina Hinojosa could have on his businesses in Texas, saying "based on everything I've heard about her, I think things will be fine in Texas with Gina as governor."

Hasan Piker, a left-wing Twitch livestreamer and political commentator who was the subject of significant (mostly negative) attention from both parties throughout the election, told NPR's Morning Edition "we are libbing out, to say the least", and pointed to the results as evidence of "complete party unity" among Democrats. During a Twitch stream about two weeks after the election, Piker changed his tune and complained about the scale of Democrats' wins potentially reducing the leverage of individual members, saying "if the Democratic Party's margin of victory was 10 and not like [...] 40, OK, then, yeah, we could have had a big caucus, a socialist caucus, a fighter caucus, whatever you want to call it, that could potentially bully the party to be more responsive to the needs of the masses."

Another popular Twitch streamer and political commentator from the right, Asmongold, expressed disappointment and anger about the results. The streamer said that the Trump administration had fallen through on several promises, mainly on foreign policy, immigration enforcement, and the Epstein Files. Asmongold ended his stream earlier than expected, with some media outlets calling the sudden end to the stream a "Rage Quit".

On the Friday following the midterms, Joe Rogan acknowledged the results on his show saying "no one thought [Republicans] were going to win", blaming the war in Iran for their loss.

Jimmy Kimmel, in responding to Trump's Truth Social post suggesting Republicans would have won if he were on the ballot, said "shut up. Just shut up. Please. Give us a break for one day and shut that ridiculous mouth" in the opening monologue for his show the night after the election.

=== Market reactions ===
Immediately following the Republican election defeat, Tesla and SpaceX, both owned by Musk, shares fell by 5% and 6.9% in pre-market trading respectively. On Thursday November 5, the Nasdaq Composite fell 5.5% over fears of backlash against AI development and data centers, extending its decline to 12% since October 6. More than 40 ballot measures to restrict data center development passed, according to tracking website Data Centers on the Ballot. By Monday 9, the Nasdaq had recovered to 99.3% of its October 30 level.

== International reactions ==
International politicians expressed a range of feelings in response to the results, including excitement, hope, and relief, as well as worry or fatigue with the American political process. (Note: Attributed to multiple sources:)

== See also ==
- 2026 United States electoral calendar
- 2006 United States elections
- 1986 United States elections
- United Democracy Project (UDP)

=== Lists ===
- List of elections in the United States
- List of elections in 2026
