= Global Engagement Center =

U.S. federal government agency

Global Engagement Center (GEC)
- Seal of the United States Department of State

Agency overview
- Formed: 2016
- Dissolved: 2024
- Headquarters: Washington, D.C.
- Agency executive: James P. Rubin, Special Envoy and Coordinator
- Parent department: U.S. Department of State
- Website: Official website

The Global Engagement Center (GEC) was an agency within the Bureau of Global Public Affairs at the United States Department of State. Established in 2016, its mission was to lead U.S. government efforts to "recognize, understand, expose, and counter foreign state and non-state propaganda and disinformation efforts aimed at undermining or influencing the policies, security, or stability of the United States, its allies, and partner nations" around the world. GEC closed in December 2024 and was re-organized as the State Department's Counter Foreign Information and Manipulation and Interference Office. In April 2025, United States Secretary of State Marco Rubio announced its closure, stating that the office had wasted taxpayer money and engaged in censorship. Other State Department officials disagreed, calling accusations of censorship "fictitious" and arguing that the center's closure was politically motivated.

== History ==
Executive Order 13584 of 2011 established the State Department's Center for Strategic Counterterrorism Communications (CSCC) to support "agencies in Government-wide public communications activities targeted against violent extremism and terrorist organizations.” Five years later on March 14, 2016, Barack Obama signed Executive Order 13721 which renamed CSCC as the Global Engagement Center while retaining its counterterrorism mission.

The National Defense Authorization Act for Fiscal Year 2017 expanded GEC's mission by giving it the authority to address other foreign propaganda, misinformation, and disinformation operations, following some Members of Congress' call for a stronger response to Russian interference in U.S. elections through propaganda. The National Defense Authorization Act for Fiscal Year 2019 further expanded GEC's scope of work, including endowing it with a mandate, as reflected in its current mission statement.

In September 2022, the Office of the Director of National Intelligence (ODNI) activated the Foreign Malign Influence Center (FMIC). In May 2023, director of national intelligence Avril Haines testified before the Senate Armed Services Committee that the FMIC would support GEC and other entities within the U.S. government to help them understand "the plans and intentions of the key actors in this space: China, Russia, Iran, etc."

The GEC, which operated with a $61 million budget and a staff of approximately 120, shut down in December 2024 when the GOP-led Congress declined to renew its funding. It was re-organized as the State Department's Counter Foreign Information and Manipulation and Interference Office (R/FIMI).

In April 2025, the Trump administration announced a shutdown of GEC's successor R/FIMI, with Secretary of State Marco Rubio alleging that R/FIMI wasted millions of dollars and engaged in censorship, while crediting Trump official Darren Beattie for spearheading the shutdown of R/FIMI. Beattie's news website Revolver had previously repeatedly criticized R/FIMI for censoring conservatives, while Beattie is married to a Russian woman with links to the Russian government, and he has said that most Western institutions would benefit from being "controlled" by Vladimir Putin.

== Leadership and staff ==
Michael D. Lumpkin led GEC from January 2016 to January 2017. According to a 2018 report prepared for the French government, the GEC was predominantly staffed by Pentagon employees. Lea Gabrielle served as GEC director from February 11, 2019, to February 19, 2021.

In December 2022, Secretary of State Antony Blinken announced the appointment of James P. Rubin as GEC special envoy and coordinator, reporting to the under secretary of state for public diplomacy and public affairs.

== Activities ==
GEC's core work was divided into five interconnected areas, as summarized below:

1. Analytics and research: Collect data from foreign actors to produce and share analyzes on foreign malign information influence operations with stakeholders within the State Department.
2. International partnerships: Participate in international coalitions/partnerships with foreign governments to coordinate counter-disinformation analyzes and solutions.
3. Programs and campaigns: GEC houses teams focused on Russia, China, Iran, and Counterterrorism. It tailors initiatives and coordinates internally within the State Department, across agencies, and with international allies.
4. Exposure: Coordinate interagency exposure of foreign information influence activities.
5. Technology assessment and engagement: Host private-sector technology demonstrations, assess counter-disinformation technologies, and identify technological solutions.

In March 2020, then-GEC coordinator Lea Gabrielle testified at a Senate Foreign Relations Committee hearing titled "The Global Engagement Center: Leading the United States Government's Fight Against Global Disinformation Threat." In October 2023, GEC Principal Deputy Coordinator Daniel Kimmage testified at a House Foreign Affairs Committee hearing titled "The Global Engagement Center: Helping or Hurting U.S. Foreign Policy."

GEC also issued grants to support research identifying foreign disinformation campaigns. It offered graduate students of Columbia University School of International and Public Affairs multiple opportunities to collaborate, including on a study examining "Russian active measures on Twitter targeting American audiences with content regarding the Syrian conflict" in Spring 2019, and on a study analyzing seven aspects of China's global influence operations in Spring 2022.

=== Special report on China ===
In September 2023, the U.S. State Department published Global Engagement Center Special Report: How the People’s Republic of China Seeks to Reshape the Global Information Environment. In what the Associated Press called "a first-of-its-kind-report", the State Department accused the Chinese government of using "deceptive and coercive methods" to influence public opinion. The methods discussed included buying content and acquiring stakes in newspapers and television networks outside China; coercing international organizations and media outlets to silence its critics; creating fake personas to spread disinformation; and using repression to shut down social media accounts. The New York Times wrote that the accusations "reflect worry in Washington that China’s information operations pose a growing security challenge to the United States and to democratic principles around the world by promoting 'digital authoritarianism.'"

=== Pre-empting disinformation ===
In October 2023, GEC took the unusual step of exposing a nascent disinformation campaign as it had barely gotten off the ground, publicly linking a Pressenza article recycling disinformation about a Russian Orthodox monastery in Kyiv, Ukraine, to a covert operation to spread Russian propaganda in Central and South America.

== Reception ==
=== Concerns about funding, procedure, and impact ===
Early reactions to the GEC considered it an important component of US response to foreign propaganda and disinformation but criticized its slow start. In 2017, some members of Congress, including Republican Rob Portman and Democrat Chris Murphy, co-sponsors of the FY2017 NDAA, successfully advocated for the GEC to receive a substantial budget increase. However, Secretary of State Rex Tillerson delayed the State Department's formal request for the funds, stalling the GEC's work for months. Portman and others suggested that the agency had turned a corner in 2019 when it hired Lea Gabrielle, a former Navy pilot and intelligence officer who worked for Fox News, as head of the organization. As of May 2020, GEC had a staff of 120.

In its analysis of GEC's response to the COVID-19 infodemic, The Cyber Defense Review noted that the agency had chosen to fund partner organizations rather than taking a direct role in fighting disinformation, and that it lacked a social media presence of its own. Explaining that GEC's predecessor agencies – the Center for Strategic Counterterrorism Communications, the Global Strategic Center, and the Counterterrorism Communication Center – had relied on partner entities to combat ISIS propaganda, Major Neill Perry argued that the approach was less effective in countering disinformation targeting American domestic audiences. In addition, Perry expressed concern that Congress had directed the Office of the Director of National Intelligence (ODNI) to create yet another agency, the Foreign Malign Influence Response Center (FMIRC), without specifying how it would collaborate and avoid duplication with GEC.

In a December 2023 Asia Society report titled "The New Domestic Politics of U.S.-China Relations," Evan S. Medeiros described the establishment of GEC as a dimension of the "new bureaucratic politics" of U.S. China policy. He wrote: "Although not focused specifically on China, Beijing’s propaganda efforts have been a central focus of its work, including by calling out various disinformation campaigns run by China. The GEC, for example, has been at the forefront of documenting parallel disinformation campaigns by Russia and China about U.S. activities in Ukraine meant to advance the Russian narrative to justify its 2022 invasion.”

=== Concerns about impact on free expression ===
Russian state-run English-language media compared the GEC to the "Ministry of Truth" in George Orwell's Nineteen Eighty-Four. A 2018 article in the Air Force Law Review examined several issues raised by GEC, including possible abridgment of freedom of the press, pointing out that "Under the First Amendment, arguably the very existence of a state-controlled entity that pronounces who is and is not 'fake' functions like an unconstitutional license on the press."

In April 2020, the inspector general for the State Department concluded that the GEC lacked safeguards to ensure that independent organizations it was working with were acting appropriately, such as when it funded a project called "Iran Disinfo" which aggressively targeted groups including the National Iranian American Council. Critics of the Trump administration also cited Trump's "lack of credibility on misinformation" as an impediment to advancing the agency's efforts to combat fake news.

In May 2023, Republicans Michael McCaul, Brian Mast, Chris Smith, Darrell Issa, Maria Elvira Salazar, Keith Self, Cory Mills, and Ken Buck co-authored an oversight letter to U.S. Secretary of State Antony Blinken, in which they alleged that GEC had strayed from its founding mission by facilitating censorship of conservative opinions in the U.S., among other things.

== Publications ==
=== Reports ===
- GEC Special Report: Russia’s Pillars of Disinformation and Propaganda, August 2020
- Report: RT and Sputnik’s Role in Russia’s Disinformation and Propaganda Ecosystem, January 20, 2022
- PRC Efforts To Manipulate Global Public Opinion on Xinjiang, August 24, 2022
- Gendered Disinformation: Tactics, Themes, and Trends by Foreign Malign Actors, March 27, 2023
- Global Engagement Center Special Report: How the People’s Republic of China Seeks to Reshape the Global Information Environment, September 28, 2023
- The Kremlin’s War Against Ukraine’s Children, August 24, 2023

== Closure and reactions ==
After the GEC's closure and reorganization into R/FIMI, Secretary of State Marco Rubio closed R/FIMI and suggested its files might be made public. In response, US Senators Jeanne Shaheen and Chris Murphy wrote a letter to Secretary Rubio on September 18, 2025, expressing that "given Mr. Beattie's history on this issue, we are deeply concerned that such an initiative will use cherry-picked information to promote the baseless conspiracy theory that the GEC sought to 'censor' conservative speech"; they also expressed concerns that the State Department would release personal information related to State Department staff and its partners abroad, leading to harassment or violence against them.

Observers noted that the closure of the GEC coincided with the eradication or weakening of other government guardrails against foreign propaganda and election interference, calling it a victory for partisan media but a defeat for U.S. cybersecurity. The Guardian reported that the Republican-led campaign to discredit the work of the GEC focused on their support for the Global Disinformation Index, a non-profit based in the UK, which in 2022 "published its own study of the US media market that rated several conservative outlets, including Newsmax, One America News and the New York Post, as high-risk" and stated that critics used this "as evidence that a foreign-facing office had funded a group meddling in domestic politics".

== See also ==
- Countering Foreign Propaganda and Disinformation Act
