= Lea Gabrielle =

American journalist

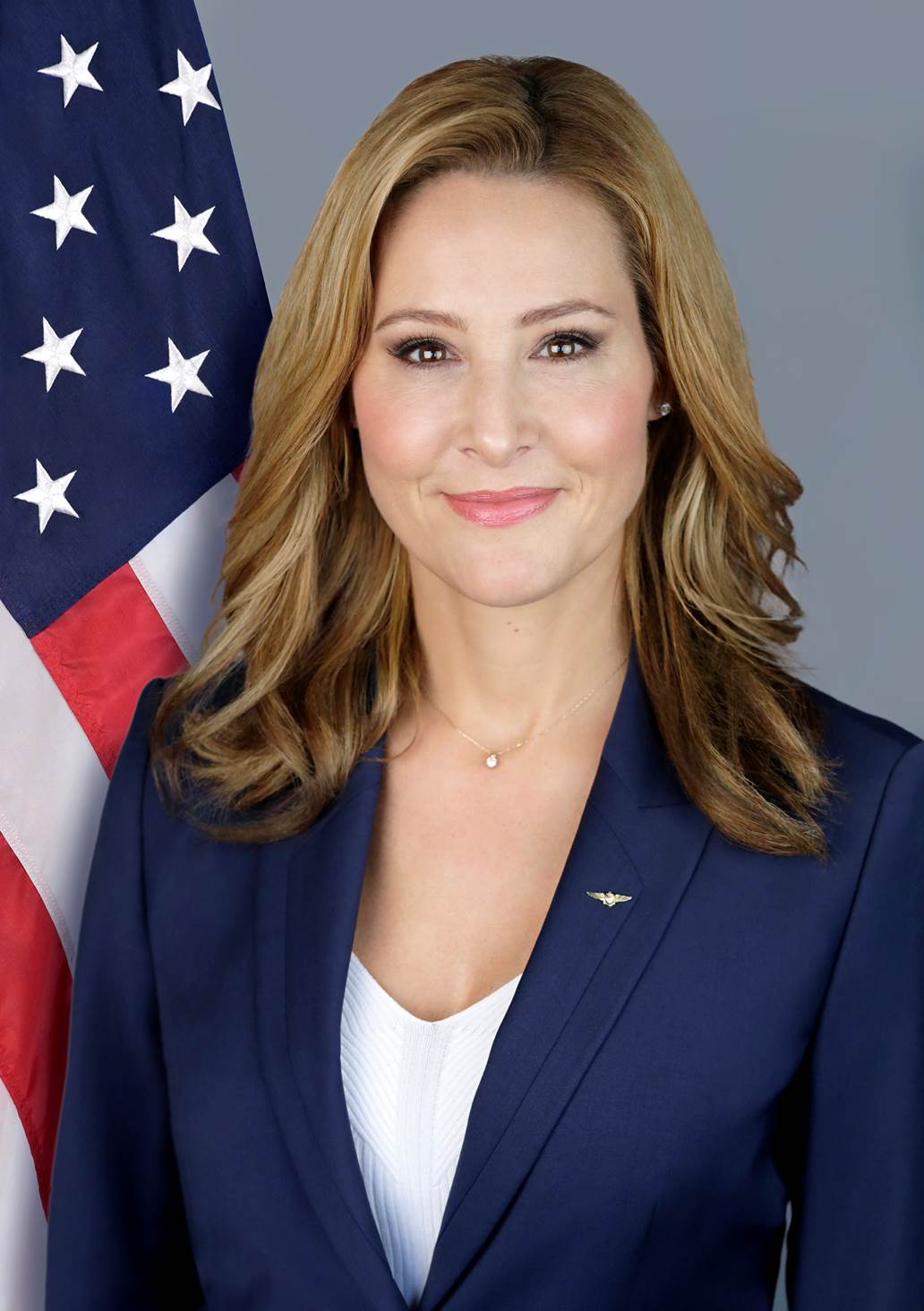
- Born: Lea Gabrielle Potts; Alexandria, Virginia, US
- Other names: Lea Sutton; Lea Gabrielle Sutton
- Education: United States Naval Academy (1997)
- Occupations: Journalist and Naval aviator

Lea Gabrielle is a former U.S. Diplomat who served as the Special Envoy and Coordinator of the Global Engagement Center at the U.S. Department of State from 2019–2021. She formerly served in the United States Navy for twelve years as a combat naval aviator and intelligence officer. As a civilian, she worked as a journalist and correspondent for the Fox News Channel and NBC News. In 2024 she was named vice president and general manager for the Mount Snow ski resort.

== Early life and education ==
While attending Mount Vernon High School in Fairfax County, Virginia, Gabrielle was named a finalist in the Westinghouse Science Talent Search. She is a 1997 graduate of the United States Naval Academy, earning a Bachelor of Science in mechanical engineering. Entering the active-duty Navy after graduation, Gabrielle attended the U.S. Navy Flight School at Naval Air Station Pensacola in Florida from 1998 to 2000, earning her Naval Aviator Wings. She is also qualified with an instrument rating and as a commercial pilot.

She earned a master's degree in business administration from Massachusetts Institute of Technology.

== Career ==
She served in the United States Navy for twelve years and was a naval aviator, flying the single-seat F/A-18 "Hornet," with combat deployment from USS George Washington. Her call sign as a pilot was "Flower". She also served as an intelligence operations officer during Operation Enduring Freedom, and while in Afghanistan, she was embedded with a Navy SEAL unit conducting intelligence operations. She was also a defense foreign liaison officer.

After leaving the navy, Gabrielle attended the New York Film Academy in 2009, receiving a digital journalism certificate. She then worked for NBC News (2010-2011) in Washington, D.C. In September 2011, Gabrielle moved to San Diego, California, and became a military reporter for KNSD-TV (NBC 7), using the name Lea Sutton. She joined Fox News Channel in New York City in December 2013. She was also a reporter for Shepard Smith Reporting.

In 2019 she began work at the United States Department of State countering foreign propaganda by leading the Global Engagement Center.

In 2024 the Mount Snow ski resort named Gabrielle as their vice president and general manager.
