= 2026 Mississippi elections =

United States elections

A general election was held in the U.S. state of Mississippi on in 2026 as part of the 2026 United States elections.

== Federal ==
=== U.S. Senate ===
Incumbent Republican Senator Cindy Hyde-Smith ran for reelection to a second full-term, against Scott Colom. As of Wednesday, November 11, 2026, the election had been called by the AP in favor of Colom.

=== U.S. House of Representatives ===
All 4 of the House seats were up for election.

== State and local elections ==
State elections in Mississippi were not scheduled for 2026. However, there were a few special elections on some ballots, including Mississippi House of Representatives districts 70 and 77, Mississippi State Senate district 34, and for various local judges.
