= Think Again, Turn Away =

Think Again, Turn Away (TATA)
- Motto: Some truths about terrorism
- Type of project: Anti-radicalization
- Founder: CSCC
- Country: United States
- Established: 2013
- Disestablished: 2017
- Status: Defunct

Think Again, Turn Away, or TATA, was an anti-radicalization project on social media platforms like Twitter and Facebook led by the U.S. Department of State's Center for Strategic Counterterrorism Communications to attempt to stop people from Europe and the United States from joining the Islamic State.

== History ==
The project was started in late 2013 by the U.S. Department of state against Jihadist propaganda posted by Al-Qaeda online. It later became a counter tactic against Islamic State Jihadist propaganda in 2014 and 2015, this included the making of mock-up propaganda videos which included violent imagery like war, beheadings, and executions. The first attempt of combating propaganda made by the Islamic State was making a video that showed Denis Cuspert talking about Jihad, which then it later cuts to a mock-up death of Denis Cuspert where other people had to resuscitate him, the video later cuts to the Flag of the United States with the Statue of Liberty. They then released another video entitled "Welcome to the Islamic State' land" which shows scenes of suicide bombings at mosques, crucifixions, which then cuts to text that states "You can learn useful new skills for the Ummah...blowing up mosques, crucifying and executing Muslims, plundering national resources, suicide bombings inside mosques.", which then shows the text: "Travel is inexpensive because you won’t need a return ticket", then the video shows a body being thrown off a cliff, the video was uploaded to Facebook on the official Center for Strategic Counterterrorism Communications page. The projects' tactics were considered controversial and extreme.

The project was considered ineffective of attempting to dissuade American citizens and Europeans from joining Al-Qaeda and the Islamic State.
