= Center for Strategic Counterterrorism Communications =

Former US State Department agency

- Formation: September 19, 2011; 14 years ago
- Headquarters: Washington D.C.

The Center for Strategic Counterterrorism Communications (CSCC) was an American government enterprise established in 2011 at the direction of the President and the Secretary of State to coordinate, orient, and inform government-wide foreign communications activities targeted against terrorism and violent extremism.

The Global Engagement Center, based at the State Department, replaced the CSCC in 2016.

== Objective ==
Executive Order 13584, signed by President Obama on September 9, 2011, provides policy background and assigns interagency responsibilities to CSCC. In 2015, it was expanded to coordinate similar projects by other federal departments. It controls over 350 State Department Twitter accounts, as well as others from the Pentagon, the Homeland Security Department and foreign American allies.

=== Anti-ISIS campaign ===
Its final mission was to counter online jihadist messages and propaganda by rebutting them with "negative advertising" (or "trolling") using the Think Again, Turn Away project. It has performed more than 50,000 online "engagements" in four languages: Arabic, Urdu, Somali, and English.

== See also ==
- State-sponsored Internet sockpuppetry
