= National Defense Authorization Act for Fiscal Year 2017 =

- Long title: An act to authorize appropriations for fiscal year 2017 for military activities of the Department of Defense, for military construction, and for defense activities of the Department of Energy, to prescribe military personnel strengths for such fiscal year, and for other purposes.
- Acronyms (colloquial): NDAA 17
- Enacted by: the 114th United States Congress

Citations
- Public law: Pub. L. 114–328 (text) (PDF)

Legislative history
- Introduced in the Senate as S. 2943 by John McCain (R–AZ) on May 18, 2016; Committee consideration by United States Senate Committee on Armed Services; Passed the House on December 2, 2016 (Roll Call Vote 600: 375-34); Passed the Senate on December 8, 2016 (Roll Call Vote 159: 92-7); Signed into law by President Barack Obama on December 23, 2016

The National Defense Authorization Act for Fiscal Year 2017 (H.R. 4909; NDAA 2017, Pub.L. 114-328) is a United States federal law specifying the budget and expenditures of the United States Department of Defense (DOD) for Fiscal Year 2017.

== History ==
The National Defense Authorization Act for Fiscal Year 2017 law also authorizes "Department of Energy national security programs", benefits for military personnel and their families, and includes "authorities to facilitate" ongoing international operations for the Fiscal Year 2017. It includes a new bill passed against Russian propaganda to counter the spread of biased information. "Also called the Countering Information Warfare Act of 2016 (S. 2692)". The total of $618.7 billion in spending, over $67 billion of which is destined for the overseas contingency operations account. It notably leaves restrictions in place on transferring Guantanamo Bay detainees to the United States mainland, and elevates Cyber Command to combatant command status.

On March 20, 2017, President Donald Trump sent a presidential memorandum to the Secretary of State delegating the functions and authorities vested in the President by section 3132 of the National Defense Authorization Act for Fiscal Year 2017 (Public Law 114-328). On September 8, 2017, President Trump sent a memorandum to the Secretary of State and Secretary of the Treasury with further delegations to the financial sanctions of certain countries on the list under section 1263 of the Global Magnitsky Human Rights Accountability Act.

== See also ==
- List of bills in the 114th United States Congress
- National Defense Authorization Act
