= 2026 New Jersey elections =

US state elections

A general election was held in the U.S. state of New Jersey in 2026 on November 3rd as part of the 2026 United States elections.

== Federal ==
=== United States Senate ===
Main article: 2026 United States Senate election in New Jersey

Incumbent Democrat Cory Booker ran for re-election against Republican Justin Murphy, the former deputy mayor of Tabernacle Township. Booker won 62.3% of the vote and was re-elected to a third full term.

=== United States House of Representatives ===
Main article: 2026 United States House of Representatives elections in New Jersey

- 2026 New Jersey's 11th congressional district special election

== Local ==
- 2026 Newark mayoral election
