= Ohio Organizing Collaborative =

American nonprofit organization

- Formation: 2007
- Type: 501(c)(3) non-profit Cooperative
- Tax ID no.: 261601472
- Location: Youngstown, Ohio
- Executive Directors: Kirk Noden; DaMareo Cooper (MVOC)
- Website: www.ohorganizing.org

The Ohio Organizing Collaborative (OOC) is a 501(c)(3) non-profit statewide organization focused on uniting community organizers and organizing groups across Ohio with similar interests. The OOC was formed in 2007 by Kirk Noden with a mission of organizing citizens to build power and combat social, racial and economic injustices in communities across Ohio. The goal for the OOC is to organize Ohioans and the Midwest citizens into a progressive movement. The OOC is composed of 18 community-based organizations with members in every major city across Ohio. These organizations include labor unions, faith organizations, community organizing groups among others. Currently the OOC participates in eight campaigns across the state through direct advocacy, voter engagement, fundraising, and community growth. Funding for the OOC is provided in many different ways including third party investors, grants, and fundraising.

== Campaigns ==
The OOC currently participates in several campaigns across the state. These campaigns include Mass Incarceration, Immigration Reform, Civic Engagement, Environmental Justice, Leadership Training, Caring Across Generations, Economic Dignity, and Healthy Communities. OOC endorsed the Citizens Not Politicians campaign for the 2024 Issue 1 ballot initiative against gerrymandering.

== Organization ==
The OOC is headquartered in Youngstown Ohio with regional offices across the state including Cleveland, Akron, Canton, Dayton, Cincinnati, Toledo, and Warren, Ohio. The OOC works as a tool to unite organizations and people across the state to build people "Power" across the state and take control of issues affecting the community including mass incarceration, community engagement levels, and actual equality within the social, economic, and political sectors in Ohio.

== Member organization ==
Several member organizations collectively make up the collaborative and expands its networking ability across the state. Aiming to reach community members throughout Ohio, this collaborative has designed a system of community outreach built through alliances with other organizations operating with similar interests. These organizations co-facilitate campaigns with local, regional, and national organizations targeting social justice issues and collectively building people power. Currently, the OOC comprises 18 member organizations including the Ohio Student Association, SEIU Local 1, Iron Workers, Ohio Prophetic Voices, and Northeast Ohio Alliance For Hope.

== History ==
The OOC was formed in 2007 by Kirk Noden with the mission of organizing citizens to build power and combat social, racial and economic injustices in communities across Ohio. In 2011 The collaborative aligned with Stand Up for Ohio to take a stance against Ohio Senate Bill 5 issue on collective bargaining.

In 2012 The OOC developed a Civic Engagement Program that combines organizing and mobilization strategies with electoral work. The Civic Engagement Program is focused on seniors, student, and religious communities. The OOC covers six regions and 12 counties in Ohio.

In May 2012 the OOC began its faith-based campaign, Ohio Prophetic Voices and formed its seed organization the Ohio Student Association.

In March 2017, a canvasser paid by the OOC was sentenced to six months in the Columbiana County Jail for engaging in voter registration fraud.

== 2026 FBI search ==
On June 11, 2026, agents of the Federal Bureau of Investigation (FBI) searched the OOC's Cleveland office, seizing computers and other materials, as part of a Justice Department investigation into the organization's voter registration efforts, which had been among the largest in Ohio during the 2024 election cycle. Agents also questioned the group's staff members and volunteers at homes and workplaces across the state.

A spokesperson for the FBI's Cleveland field office confirmed law enforcement activity at the organization. A Justice Department official said that search warrants are authorized by a judge and characterized outside commentary on the investigation as "unfounded speculation". OOC board member Prentiss Haney said agents told those questioned that the investigation related to voter fraud, and described the action as political intimidation of community organizers and voting rights workers:

This is not normal business. I mean there's no reason for over 100 agents to be knocking on the doors of everyday Ohioans. Demanding and accusing people of voter fraud as if it was a witch hunt and, and scaring them with the children, following them in their cars to school and to work. I mean this was a full-out assault. I mean, we haven't seen anything like this since Selma. And so this was completely um politically motivated.

— Prentiss Haney, OOC board member

The search drew responses from Ohio officials. Democratic U.S. Representatives Shontel Brown and Emilia Sykes and former U.S. Senator Sherrod Brown, then a candidate in the 2026 U.S. Senate election in Ohio, condemned the action as an attempt to intimidate voter registration efforts, as did Cleveland mayor Justin Bibb. The Brennan Center for Justice, which had previously partnered with the OOC on voting rights litigation, called the search "an outrageous fishing expedition" and said it fit a pattern of federal inquiries targeting voting infrastructure ahead of the 2026 midterm elections. The search followed an FBI raid in February 2026 on a Georgia elections office connected to an investigation of the 2020 presidential election; voter fraud in the United States is rare, according to government officials and election experts.

== Leadership training in Ohio ==
Every year, the OOC and its statewide members host a training for approximately 100 leaders from the faith and labor community, electoral politics, public officeholders and grassroots leaders who seek to be more effective organizers in their communities, churches, or workplace. OOC's weeklong training blends traditional organizing models with emerging innovation.

The Ohio Student Association, a seed of the OOC is a statewide organization led by young people. OSA engages in values-based issue & electoral organizing, nonviolent direct action, advocacy for progressive public policy, and leadership development. On campuses and communities across Ohio, they organize young people to build independent political power.

== Battling mass incarceration ==
The OOC and the Ohio Justice and Policy have partnered to identify a series of data-driven progressive solutions that will safely reduce the size of Ohio's correctional population while addressing serious concerns of racial disparity In the report Mass Incarceration and Criminal Justice Reform in Ohio published by the collaborative concluded racial Inequality was found within Ohio's criminal justice system. The collaborative reports that while African Americans represent 12.5 percent of Ohio's population, they simultaneously make up 45 percent of incarcerated individuals in Ohio. A report posted by the U.S. Department of Justice Bureau of Justice Statistics Correctional Populations in the United States, 2013, provides that there was roughly 6.9 million people under the supervision of the adult correction system by the end of 2013.About 1 in 35. The United States has the highest prison population rate in the world at 716 per 100,000 of the nation's population as reported by the Worlds Prison Population List.

The OOC focuses on a number of measures to address Ohio's mass incarceration including using its advocacy abilities to support and utilize the Ohio Department of Rehabilitation and Corrections Smart Ohio Plan which is a funding system created to increase community corrections alternatives to prison. This Plan would give counties in Ohio the ability to increase diversion program by providing funding based upon progress data and effectiveness.
