= Countering Foreign Propaganda and Disinformation Act =

2016 American anti-propaganda legislation

Countering Foreign Propaganda and Disinformation Act

The Countering Foreign Propaganda and Disinformation Act (CFPDA), initially called the Countering Information Warfare Act, is a bipartisan law of the United States Congress that establishes an interagency center within the U.S. Department of State to coordinate and synchronize counterpropaganda efforts throughout the U.S. government. It also provides funding to help train journalists and support private sector entities and experts who specialize in foreign propaganda and disinformation.

The CFPDA was written in March 2016 by U.S. Senators Rob Portman (R, OH) and Chris Murphy (D, CT) and introduced in the U.S. House of Representatives on 10 May 2016 by Congressman Adam Kinzinger (R, IL), joined by thirteen bipartisan co-sponsors, including Ted Lieu (D, CA) of the Committee on Foreign Affairs.

In both the House and Senate, the bill was included in the National Defense Authorization Act for fiscal year 2017. It passed the House in this fashion in a conference report vote on 2 December 2016; the Senate then passed the measure in a conference report on 8 December by a tally of 92–7. The 2017 National Defense Authorization Act was signed into law by President Barack Obama on 23 December 2016, thus enacting the CFPDA.

== History ==
Video of U.S. Senators Republican Rob Portman and Democrat Chris Murphy speaking about the bipartisan bill

The bipartisan bill was written in March 2016 by U.S. Senators Republican Rob Portman and Democrat Chris Murphy. It was introduced by Senator Portman under its initial name Countering Information Warfare Act, on 16 March 2016 as S.2692. It was introduced as the Countering Foreign Propaganda and Disinformation Act in the United States House of Representatives on 10 May 2016 as H.R.5181, co-sponsored by Republican Congressman Adam Kinzinger along with Democratic Congressman Ted Lieu. The bill was introduced as the Countering Foreign Propaganda and Disinformation Act in the United States Senate on 14 July 2016 sponsored by Senator Rob Portman as S.3274.

The Washington Post and the International Business Times reported that after the 2016 United States presidential election, worries grew that a disinformation campaign spread and organized by the Russian government swayed the outcome of the election, and representatives in the United States Congress took action to safeguard the National security of the United States by advancing legislation to monitor incoming propaganda from external threats. On November 30, 2016, legislators approved a measure within the National Defense Authorization Act to ask the U.S. State Department to take action against foreign propaganda through an interagency panel. The legislation authorized funding of $160 million over a two-year-period. Portman urged more U.S. government action to counter disinformation and propaganda. Murphy said that after the election it was apparent the U.S. needed additional tactics to fight Russian disinformation. Senator Ron Wyden, a member of the Senate Select Committee on Intelligence, told The Washington Post: "There is definitely bipartisan concern about the Russian government engaging in covert influence activities of this nature."

The bill advanced in the U.S. House of Representatives on 2 December 2016, when the National Defense Authorization Act for Fiscal Year 2017 conference report to S. 2943 passed in that chamber, including the Countering Foreign Propaganda and Disinformation Act.

In a speech to lawmakers on 8 December 2016, Hillary Clinton called attention to the issue, saying pending legislation before the U.S. Congress would "boost the government's response to foreign propaganda." She called on trendsetters in society to work together on the problem: "It's imperative that leaders in both the private sector and the public sector step up to protect our democracy, and innocent lives."

On 8 December 2016, the Countering Foreign Propaganda and Disinformation Act passed a vote in the U.S. Senate by a wide margin. It was included together with the National Defense Authorization Act (NDAA) Conference Report for fiscal year 2017, which passed in the U.S. Senate with a final tally of 92 to 7.

In the version of the bill incorporated into the 2017 National Defense Authorization Act, the U.S. Congress would ask the United States Secretary of State to collaborate with the United States Secretary of Defense and other relevant Federal agencies to create a "Global Engagement Center" (GEC) to fight against propaganda from foreign governments and publicize the nature of ongoing foreign propaganda and disinformation operations against the United States and other countries. The bill called for an inter-agency effort to "counter foreign propaganda and disinformation directed against United States national security interests and proactively advance fact-based narratives that support United States allies and interests."

Supporters of the resolution inside the Defense Department have publicly expressed their desire to weaken the interpretation of domestic propaganda protections, laws which prevent the United States Department of State from gathering information necessary to develop targeted propaganda messaging and prevent them from explicitly attempting to influence opinions.

According to The New York Times, as of March 2018, the State Department had not yet begun to spend the $120 million allocated to it, and not one of the 23 analysts working in the GEC could speak Russian. In 2020, the GEC issued its first report, describing what it called "Pillars of Russia's Disinformation and Propaganda Ecosystem." The GEC published another report on Kremlin-funded disinformation in January 2022.

== See also ==
- Operation Mockingbird
- 1995 CIA disinformation controversy
- Active Measures Working Group
- Counter Misinformation Team
- East StratCom Task Force
- Fake news website
- Forgery as covert operation
- Information warfare
- List of bills in the 114th United States Congress
- Russian military deception (Maskirovka)
- Post-truth politics
- Operation Infektion
- Operation Shocker
- Russian interference in the 2016 United States elections
