= 2026 Vermont elections =

- November 3, 2026

A general election was held in the U.S. state of Vermont in 2026. All of Vermont's executive officers were up for election as well as its lone seat in the U.S. House of Representatives.

== Ballot measures ==
November 3, 2026, general election
| No. | Description | Result | Yes | | No | | Type |
| No. | Description | Result | Votes | % | Votes | % | Type |
|---|---|---|---|---|---|---|---|
| 3 | Amend the state constitution to establish a right to organize or join a labor organization for the purpose of collective bargaining. | | | | | | Legislative |
| 4 | Amend the state constitution to prohibit the denial of rights to an individual based on their race, ethnicity, sex, religion, disability, sexual orientation, gender identity, gender expression, or national origin. | | | | | | Legislative |
