= Heather Honey (politician) =

Election Researcher

Deputy Assistant Secretary for Election Integrity
- Incumbent
- Assumed office August 2025

Heather Honey is a conservative election researcher, serving as the deputy assistant secretary for election integrity in the US Department of Homeland Security since August 2025.

== Career ==
Prior to Honey's appointment, she was a leader in the 2020 election denial movement, supporting then-President Donald Trump's attempts to overturn the 2020 United States presidential election. Honey runs a consulting firm called Haystack Investigations, which supported election "audits". According to Al Jazeera, the group misrepresented incomplete voter data in Pennsylvania to falsely assert the state had more votes than voters in 2020.

=== Second Trump administration ===
On October 22, 2025, The New York Times reported that Honey held a call with right-wing activists in March 2025 suggesting that the Trump administration would declare a national emergency regarding the 2020 election.

Honey's appointment was made public in August 2025. The position did not exist in the prior Biden Administration.

Following her appointment, Pennsylvania Secretary of State Al Schmidt released a statement saying his office “has spent years successfully defending Pennsylvania's election laws against lawsuits filed by Heather Honey, and we are engaged in litigation against her to this day.”
