= Foreign Malign Influence Center =

American intelligence agency

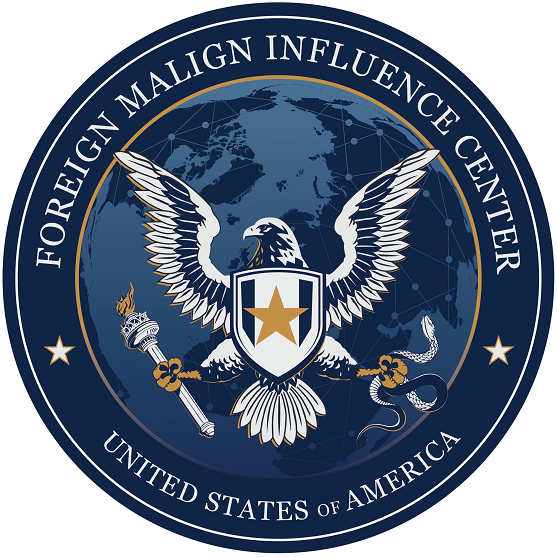

Agency overview
- Formed: September 23, 2022
- Dissolved: August 20, 2025
- Jurisdiction: United States
- Parent department: Office of the Director of National Intelligence

The Foreign Malign Influence Center (FMIC) was an American organization for integrating intelligence in foreign malign influence, which can be defined as foreign actors using subversive and/or coercive disinformation to influence how people in public discussion the United States think, act, and make decision by means of the targeting of individuals or group in the United States to cause harm. Its earlier name was the Foreign Malign Influence Response Center.

It is one of five mission centers within the Office of the Director of National Intelligence (ODNI). It works with the intelligence community to mitigate threats to U.S. democracy and national interests. The FMIC houses the Election Threats Executive, which coordinates with the intelligence community on all election security activities, initiatives, and programs. It is based at the Intelligence Community Campus-Bethesda, Bethesda, Maryland.

Prior to FMIC and at one point co-existing with FMIC, the State Department's Global Engagement Center tracked foreign disinformation from 2016 to December 23, 2024.

On August 20, 2025, Director of National Intelligence Tulsi Gabbard announced that the FMIC would be dissolved as part of a bid to downsize the ODNI.

== History ==
Out of concern towards elections being influenced by disinformation, especially by means of artificial intelligence, Congress established the FMIC within the ODNI by amending the National Security Act of 1947 (P.L. 80-253) under Section 5322 of the Intelligence Authorization Act. It was codified Title 50 U.S. Code, Sections 3058-3059. It was enacted on December 20, 2019, and activated by the DNI on September 23, 2022.

On March 8, 2023, Director of National Intelligence Avril Haines testified to the U.S. Senate Armed Services Committee that:

Congress put into law that we should establish a Foreign Malign Influence Center in the intelligence community; we have stood that up. It encompasses our election threat work, essentially looking at foreign influence and interference in elections, but it also deals with disinformation more generally.

On August 20, 2025, Director of National Intelligence Tulsi Gabbard announced that the FMIC would be dissolved as part of a bid to downsize the ODNI. An ODNI fact sheet said the FMIC was redundant with the National Intelligence Council and the National Counterintelligence and Security Center.

== Notifications ==
For notification to public about foreign malign influence, the following process takes place at FMIC:

- A panel of representatives of intelligence agencies called the Credibility Assessment Group evaluate intelligence.
- Occasionally, the Credibility Assessment Group will provide assessments to an Experts Group of senior department representatives to determine whether to recommend notifying the public of indications of foreign malign influence.

=== The Experts Group ===
The Experts Group is a group of senior representatives of the following departments:

- U.S. Department of Defense
- U.S. Department of State
- U.S. Department of Justice
- U.S. Department of the Treasury
- U.S. Department of Homeland Security
- Cybersecurity and Infrastructure Security Agency (CISA)

== FMIC definition of foreign malign influence ==
According to a 2024 FMIC release, foreign malign influence is "a type of foreign influence that includes one, or a combination of, the following characteristics:

- Subversive: intends to undermine the United States, its institutions, political systems, or the will of the American people
- Undeclared: intends to hide a foreign country’s hand
- Coercive: pressures individuals or groups in the United States to make decisions or support policies that favor a foreign country
- Criminal: violates U.S. law"

== FMIC functions ==
By statute, the FMIC has two functions:

- To serve as the primary U.S. government organization for the analyzing and integrating of all intelligence that pertains to foreign malign influence.
- To provide Members of Congress and policymakers in the federal government “comprehensive assessments, and indications and warnings, of foreign malign influence.”
