= Wave elections in the United States =

Elections in which a political party makes major gains

The 1974 midterm elections resulted in net Democratic Party gains of 49 seats in the U.S. House of Representatives. The Watergate scandal, which resulted in the resignation of President Richard Nixon in August, contributed to the ousting of incumbents of both parties in favor of challengers known as "Watergate Babies"

Wave elections in the United States are elections in which a political party makes major gains. Based on the "red states and blue states" color coding convention in use since 2000, wave elections have often been described as either "blue waves" or "red waves" depending on which party makes significant gains, referring to a major increase in seats held by either the Democratic Party, associated with blue, or the Republican Party, associated with red.

Wave elections usually happen during midterm elections. For instance, the Republican Revolution occurred during the 1994 midterm elections, in which Newt Gingrich rose to prominence as the leader of the House Republican Conference, and the Republican Party regained control of both the House of Representatives and the Senate during the presidency of Bill Clinton.

There is no consensus definition of what level of gains is necessary to constitute a wave election.

== Terminology ==
Political analyst Charlie Cook describes wave elections as the result of an "overarching, nationwide dynamic", such as a high or low presidential approval rating, economic conditions, and scandals. Cook contrasts wave elections with "micro-elections" in which neither party makes significant gains, and candidates, local issues, and other factors not strictly related to party alignment have a stronger role than in wave elections. Although several wave elections may occur in a row, wave elections are usually considered to be the exception rather than the norm. A pick-up of 20 seats in the United States House of Representatives has been used as a cut-off point by analysts such as Stuart Rothenberg. However, political scientist Dan Hopkins has argued that the term has little utility in understanding elections and that there is no clear cut-off point between a wave election and other elections.

Congressional incumbents in the United States enjoy an electoral advantage over challengers, but a wave election often boosts challengers, resulting in many more incumbents losing than usual during wave elections. A wave election can put into play seats that would otherwise be considered safe for the party holding the seat, and help even flawed challengers defeat incumbents. Since at least 1954, wave elections have always benefited one party at the expense of the other, but the term has also been used to describe a hypothetical scenario in which numerous incumbents from both parties lose their seats. The first election after redistricting is often a wave election, since many incumbents are less firmly rooted in their districts following redistricting, and many other incumbents retire or suffer primary defeats.

A wave election may also be concurrent with a landslide election, a term which usually refers to decisive victories in presidential contests. Many wave elections occur during midterm elections, with the party out of power picking up seats. A common pattern involves a party with a victorious presidential candidate benefiting from a wave election, followed by the opposing party winning a wave election in the next midterm election. Such occurred:

- In 1872, with the re-election of President Ulysses S. Grant, followed by the Democratic wave of 1874, with the Democratic Party retaking control of the House.
- In 1888, with the election of Benjamin Harrison as President, followed by the Democratic wave of 1890, with the Democratic Party retaking control of the House.
- In 1892, with the second election of Grover Cleveland as President, followed by the Republican wave of 1894, with the Republican Party retaking control of the House and the Senate. (Note: This was before the passage of the 17th amendment, so Senators were chosen by State Legislatures.)
- In 1916, with the re-election of President Woodrow Wilson, followed by the Republican wave of 1918, with the Republican Party retaking control of the House and the Senate.
- In 1944, with the third re-election of President Franklin D. Roosevelt, followed by the Republican wave of 1946, with the Republican Party retaking control of the House and the Senate. (Note: Although Harry S. Truman was president when the elections took place that year.)
- In 1952, with the election of Dwight D. Eisenhower as President, followed by the Democratic wave of 1954, with the Democratic Party retaking control of the House and the Senate.
- In 1984, with the re-election of President Ronald Reagan, followed by Democratic wave of 1986, with the Democratic Party retaking control of the Senate.
- In 1992, with the election of Bill Clinton as President, followed by the Republican wave of 1994, with the Republican Party retaking control of the House and the Senate.
- In 2004, with the re-election of President George W. Bush, followed by the Democratic wave of 2006, with the Democratic Party retaking control of the House and the Senate.
- In 2008, with the election of Barack Obama as President, followed by the Republican wave of 2010, with the Republican Party retaking control of the House.
- In 2012, with the re-election of President Obama, followed by another Republican wave of 2014, with the Republican Party retaking control of the Senate.
- In 2016, with the first election of Donald Trump as President, followed by the Democratic wave of 2018, with the Democratic Party retaking control of the House.
- In 2024, with the second election of Donald Trump as President, followed by the Democratic wave of 2026, with the Democratic Party retaking control of the House and the Senate. The 2026 elections were contemporaneously described by politicians and media as a "blue tsunami" in reference to the large scale of Democratic gains compared to prior "blue wave" elections.

== Examples in the House ==
1874, Democrats gained 92 seats

1890, Democrats gained 86 seats

1894, Republicans gained 110 seats

1920, Republicans gained 63 seats

1932, Democrats gained 97 seats

1946, Republicans gained 55 seats

1994, Republicans gained 54 seats

2006, Democrats gained 31 seats

2010, Republicans gained 63 seats

2018, Democrats gained 41 seats

2026, Democrats gained at least 44 seats

== Examples in the Senate ==
1920, Republicans gained 10 seats

1932, Democrats gained 12 seats

1946, Republicans gained 12 seats

1958, Democrats gained 15 seats

1980, Republicans gained 12 seats

1986, Democrats gained 8 seats

1994, Republicans gained 8 seats

2006, Democrats gained 6 seats (Note: Though Joe Lieberman (CT) won on the Connecticut for Lieberman ticket, he referred to himself as an independent Democrat and was listed on the Senate website as ID-CT.)

2008, Democrats gained 8 seats

2014, Republicans gained 9 seats

2026, Democrats gained 9 seats

== See also ==
- Anti-incumbency – Political sentiment against incumbents
- Coattail effect – Tendency for a popular candidate to attract votes for other candidates of the same party
- Landslide victory – Election result wherein a party or candidate wins by a large margin
- Party divisions of United States Congresses
- Political tsunami (Malaysian politics) – Term describing landslide electoral results
- Red states and blue states – United States voting pattern
- Six-year itch – American political pattern
