= Six-year itch =

American political pattern

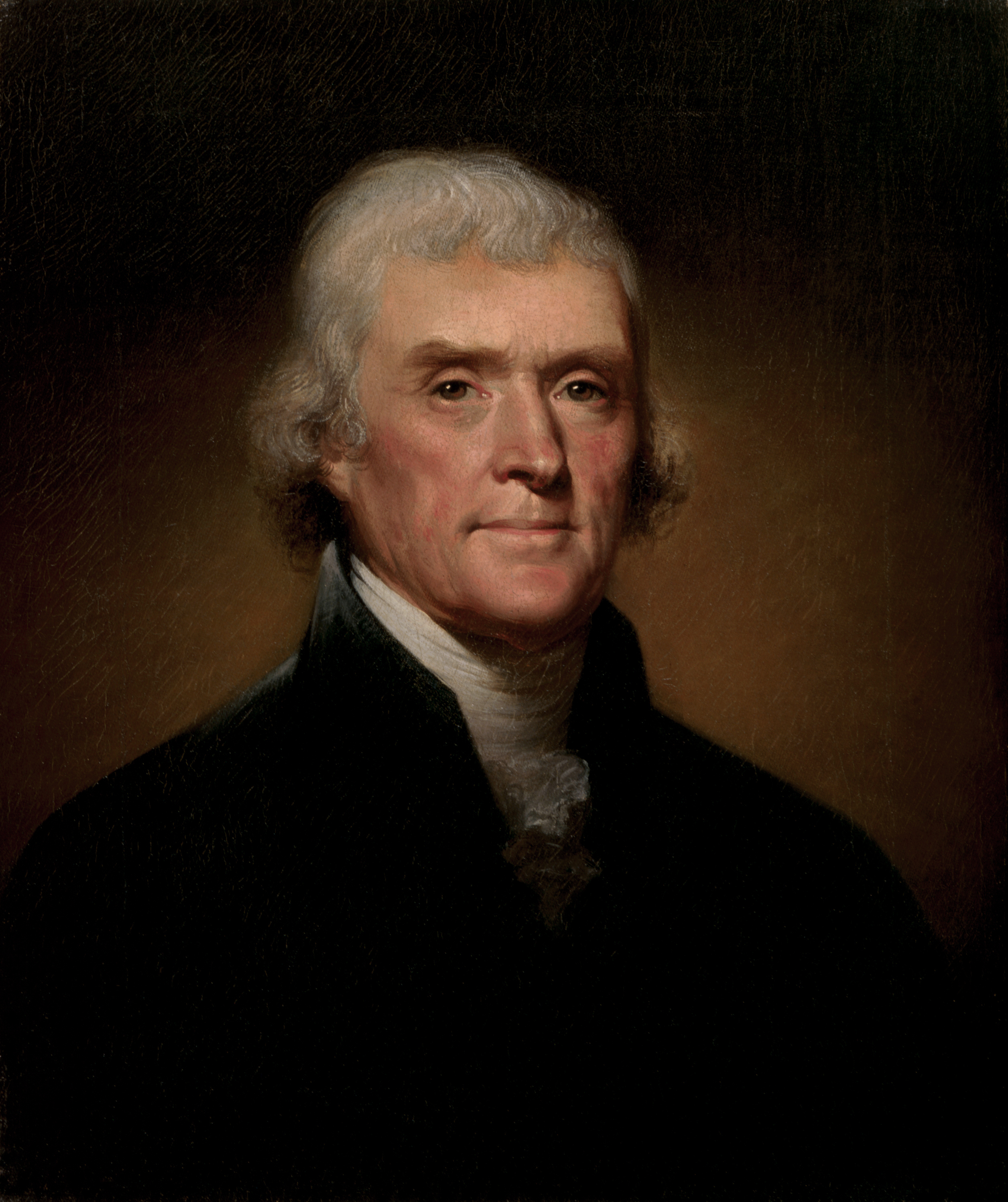
Thomas Jefferson is the only two-term president in American history whose party gained seats in both houses in the sixth year of his presidency.

The six-year itch, according to political scientists, is the pattern which takes place during a U.S. president's sixth year in office. This year is characterized by the nation's disgruntled attitude towards the president and their political party. During this time, there is a midterm election and the incumbent president's party usually loses a significant number of seats in Congress.

The term is derived from the phrase "seven-year itch", referring to a supposed pattern that relationships often sour after seven years of marriage, and the 1955 film of the same name. One of the earliest uses of the term in politics was by Republican strategist Kevin Phillips in a nationally syndicated 1973 column which looked ahead to the 1974 midterms.

== History ==
=== Pre-Reconstruction ===
Prior to Reconstruction, the six-year itch saw the president's party gain seats in one house, while losing seats in the other house. Presidents before Reconstruction whose party had this occur:

Democratic-Republican Thomas Jefferson was the only two-term president before Reconstruction not to have this occur. In 1806, his party gained 2 seats in the House and gained 1 seat in the Senate.

- 1814 – Democratic-Republican James Madison: Gained 5 seats in the House, but lost 2 seats in the Senate
- 1822 – Democratic-Republican James Monroe: Gained 34 seats in the House, while the Senate was unchanged
- 1834 – Democrat Andrew Jackson: Lost 0 seats in the House (the smallest swing in the House's history), but gained 1 seat in the Senate and gained control of the chamber

No president between 1837 and 1861 (the only inauguration of Martin Van Buren and first inauguration of Abraham Lincoln respectively) served a second term. Only 3 presidents served at most a full 4-year term in office between those two years, with the rest serving between 1 month and 3 years and 11 months as president. As such, no elections are recorded on this article between that 24-year timespan.

The Republican Party saw strong gains in the midterms of 1866, although Andrew Johnson, a former Democrat who had been elected as Abraham Lincoln's vice president on the National Union ticket, was president at the time. The Republicans gained 40 seats in the House and 18 seats in the Senate (the largest swing in the history of the Senate).

=== Post-Reconstruction ===
After Reconstruction, the six-year itch saw the president's party consistently lose seats in both houses. Presidents since Reconstruction whose party had this occur:

- 1874 – Republican Ulysses S. Grant: Lost 93 seats in the House*, lost 10 seats in the Senate
- 1894 – Democrat Grover Cleveland (although this was his second term, it was not consecutive with his first): Lost 127 seats in the House* (the largest swing in the House's history), lost 4 seats in the Senate*
- 1918 – Democrat Woodrow Wilson: Lost 22 seats in the House*, lost 5 seats in the Senate*
- 1926 – Republican Calvin Coolidge: Lost 9 seats in the House, lost 6 seats in the Senate
- 1938 – Democrat Franklin D. Roosevelt: Lost 72 seats in the House, lost 7 seats in the Senate
- 1950 – Democrat Harry S. Truman: Lost 28 seats in the House, lost 5 seats in the Senate
- 1958 – Republican Dwight D. Eisenhower: Lost 48 seats in the House^, lost 13 seats in the Senate^
- 1966 – Democrat Lyndon B. Johnson: Lost 47 seats in the House, lost 3 seats in the Senate
- 1974 – Republican Richard Nixon (although Gerald Ford was president when the elections took place that year): Lost 48 seats in the House^, lost 4 seats in the Senate^
- 1986 – Republican Ronald Reagan: Lost 5 seats in the House^, lost 8 seats in the Senate*
- 2006 – Republican George W. Bush: Lost 30 seats in the House*, lost 6 seats in the Senate*
- 2014 – Democrat Barack Obama: Lost 13 seats in the House^, lost 9 seats in the Senate*
- 2026 – Republican Donald Trump (although this is his second term, it was not consecutive with his first): Lost 43-47 seats in the House*, lost 9 seats in the Senate*, final results TBD.

*: The losses by the president's party resulted in the other party gaining control of this chamber.
^: Although the president's party lost seats, this chamber was already under the control of the opposition party.

Bill Clinton is the only two-term president since Reconstruction whose party did not lose seats due to the six-year itch.

Democrat Bill Clinton is the only two-term president since Reconstruction not to have this occur. In 1998, his party gained 5 seats in the House of Representatives and the Senate was unchanged (the smallest swing in the Senate's history). His party was uniquely in the minority in both houses of Congress and remained so after the elections.

On only four occasions has the six-year itch caused the president's party to lose control of Congress completely: Grover Cleveland (non-consecutive term) in 1894, Woodrow Wilson in 1918, George W. Bush in 2006, and Donald Trump (non-consecutive term) in 2026. Conversely, only four presidents saw their parties maintain control of Congress even after the six-year itch: Republican Calvin Coolidge in 1926, Democrats Franklin D. Roosevelt in 1938, Harry S. Truman in 1950, and Lyndon B. Johnson in 1966. Only two presidents already had a Congress that was completely dominated by the opposition party by the time of the six-year itch: Republicans Dwight D. Eisenhower in 1958 and Richard Nixon (Gerald Ford at the time of the elections) in 1974.

In addition, only one president has ever lost control of one house while keeping the other: Republican Ulysses S. Grant in 1874, who lost the House but kept the Senate. Republican Ronald Reagan lost the Senate in 1986 due to the six-year itch, but his party never controlled the House during his presidency. Lastly, the only president to have lost one house of Congress due to the six-year itch after already losing the other one in the previous midterm election was Democrat Barack Obama in 2014 (in both cases, their respective parties lost the Senate while the House was already under the control of the opposition party).

== Comparison with other midterms ==
Overall, the six-year itch phenomenon may be viewed as an extension of "the midterm effect" where an incumbent president's party almost always loses seats in midterm elections. Since Reconstruction, only five presidents have ever seen their party gain seats in a midterm election, and those gains have largely been modest: Franklin D. Roosevelt in 1934 (gained 9 House seats and 9 Senate seats), John F. Kennedy in 1962 (gained 4 Senate seats, but lost 4 House seats), Richard Nixon in 1970 (gained a Senate seat, but lost 12 House seats), Bill Clinton in 1998 (gained 5 House seats and no Senate seats), George W. Bush in 2002 (gained 8 House seats and 2 Senate seats), Donald Trump in 2018 (gained 2 Senate seats, but lost 42 House seats), and Joe Biden in 2022 (gained a Senate seat, but lost 9 House seats). Some of these exceptions have occurred alongside major events, such as the Great Depression, Cuban Missile Crisis and September 11 attacks. Others have been due to controversial actions of the opposition party, such as the impeachment of Bill Clinton. In elections from 1958-1996, "the average sixth-year loss for the president's party in Congress [was] forty-three House members and eight senators".

The losses suffered during a president's second midterm tend to be more pronounced than during their first midterm. One explanation for this in the Senate is that senators serve six year terms, so the losses or gains in an election six years after a president was elected (in the event they win 2 consecutive terms) are relative to an election where the President's party won the Presidency for their first term, and thus was likely to have done well in the Senate as well.

== See also ==
- Anti-incumbency – Political sentiment against incumbents
- Coattail effect – Tendency for a popular candidate to attract votes for other candidates of the same party
- Government trifecta – Political situation in some democratic governments
- The Seven Year Itch – 1955 romantic comedy film directed by Billy Wilder
- Wave elections in the United States – Elections in which a political party makes major gains
