= List of elections in 1817 =

The following elections occurred in the year 1817.

== North America ==
=== United States ===
==== United States lieutenant gubernatorial ====
- 1817 Connecticut lieutenant gubernatorial election

==== United States gubernatorial ====
- 1817 Connecticut gubernatorial election
- 1817 Georgia gubernatorial election
- 1817 Maryland gubernatorial election
- 1817 Massachusetts gubernatorial election
- 1817 Mississippi gubernatorial election
- 1817 New Hampshire gubernatorial election
- 1817 New Jersey gubernatorial election
- 1817 New York gubernatorial election
- 1817 North Carolina gubernatorial election
- 1817 Rhode Island gubernatorial election
- 1817 Tennessee gubernatorial election
- 1817 Vermont gubernatorial election
- 1817 Virginia gubernatorial election

==== United States Senate ====
- 1816 and 1817 United States Senate elections

==== United States House of Representatives ====
- 1816 and 1817 United States House of Representatives elections
- 1817 Alabama Territoral congressional election
- 1817 Connecticut's at-large congressional district special election
- 1817 United States House of Representatives election in Indiana
- 1817 Indiana's at-large congressional district special election
- 1817 Kentucky's 3rd congressional district special election
- 1817 Maryland's 5th congressional district special election
- 1817 Massachusetts's 11th congressional district special election
- 1817 United States House of Representatives election in Mississippi
- 1817 New York's 4th congressional district special election
- 1817 North Carolina's 8th congressional district special election
- 1817 Pennsylvania's 10th congressional district special election
- 1817 United States House of Representatives elections in Rhode Island
- 1817 South Carolina's 6th congressional district special election
- 1817 United States House of Representatives elections in Tennessee
- 1817 United States House of Representatives elections in Virginia
- 1817 Virginia's 15th congressional district special election

== See also ==
- Category:1817 elections
