= Anti-incumbency =

Political sentiment against incumbents

Countries by laws on re-election: Countries that absolutely prohibit presidential re-election. Countries that prohibit immediate presidential re-election, but allow more than one election to the presidential office (not consecutive). Countries that prohibit indefinite consecutive presidential re-election, but allow more than one election to the presidential office (not consecutive). Countries that allow immediate presidential re-election, but prohibit indefinite presidential re-election. Countries that allow indefinite presidential re-election. *: Countries with both a president and prime minister.

Anti-incumbency is sentiment in favor of voting out incumbent politicians, for the specific reason of being incumbent politicians. It is sometimes referred to as a "throw the bums out" sentiment. Periods of anti-incumbent sentiment are typically characterized by wave elections. This sentiment can also lead to support for term limits.

In a two-party system, due to the spoiler effect, anti-incumbent voters typically only have one viable option if they wish to effectively vote against the incumbent. By contrast, in a multi-party system, such as one that uses proportional representation, there are usually multiple opposition parties that anti-incumbent voters can pick from.

== Causes ==
When voters perceive times as bad, this can cause anti-incumbent sentiment. However, this is subject to biases. Perceptions of whether, e.g., economic conditions have worsened during a politician's term are influenced by partisan bias, for instance. In the United States, reliance on partisan media, as opposed to mainstream media, is associated with anti-incumbent attitudes toward Congress. New democracies' elections, such as those in Central and Eastern Europe, and in Latin America and Asia, often are characterized by anti-incumbency.

== History ==
In 2024, almost every incumbent party worldwide that was facing election either lost power, such as in the United Kingdom, United States, Ghana, Senegal, and Botswana, or faced a loss in vote share, such as in South Africa, India, France, and Japan. Among democracies, over 80 percent saw the incumbent party lose support compared to the last election in a global wave of anti-incumbency not seen since at least a century prior.

=== Bulgaria ===
In Bulgaria, virtually every government has been ousted from power after one legislative period.

=== Bhutan ===
The 2018 Bhutanese National Assembly election had an anti-incumbent result.

=== India ===
India has the highest rate of anti-incumbency in the world, with incumbents from the ruling party having only a fifty-fifty shot at returning to parliament. For example, since 1985, the electorate in Himachal Pradesh has oscillated between voting the Bharatiya Janata Party and the Indian National Congress into power. In Karnataka, the last time the ruling government was re-elected was in the 1985 Indian elections. Kerala has always voted for whichever is the opposition pre-poll alliance from the 1982 assembly elections until the 2021 election. Voter turnout does not appear correlated with incumbents' electoral performance.

In 2018, India's period of anti-incumbency was accompanied by acute rural distress, multiple farmer agitations and serious joblessness.

=== Mexico ===
In the 2010 Mexican gubernatorial elections, incumbents from the Institutional Revolutionary Party, National Action Party, and Party of the Democratic Revolution were rejected.

=== United States ===
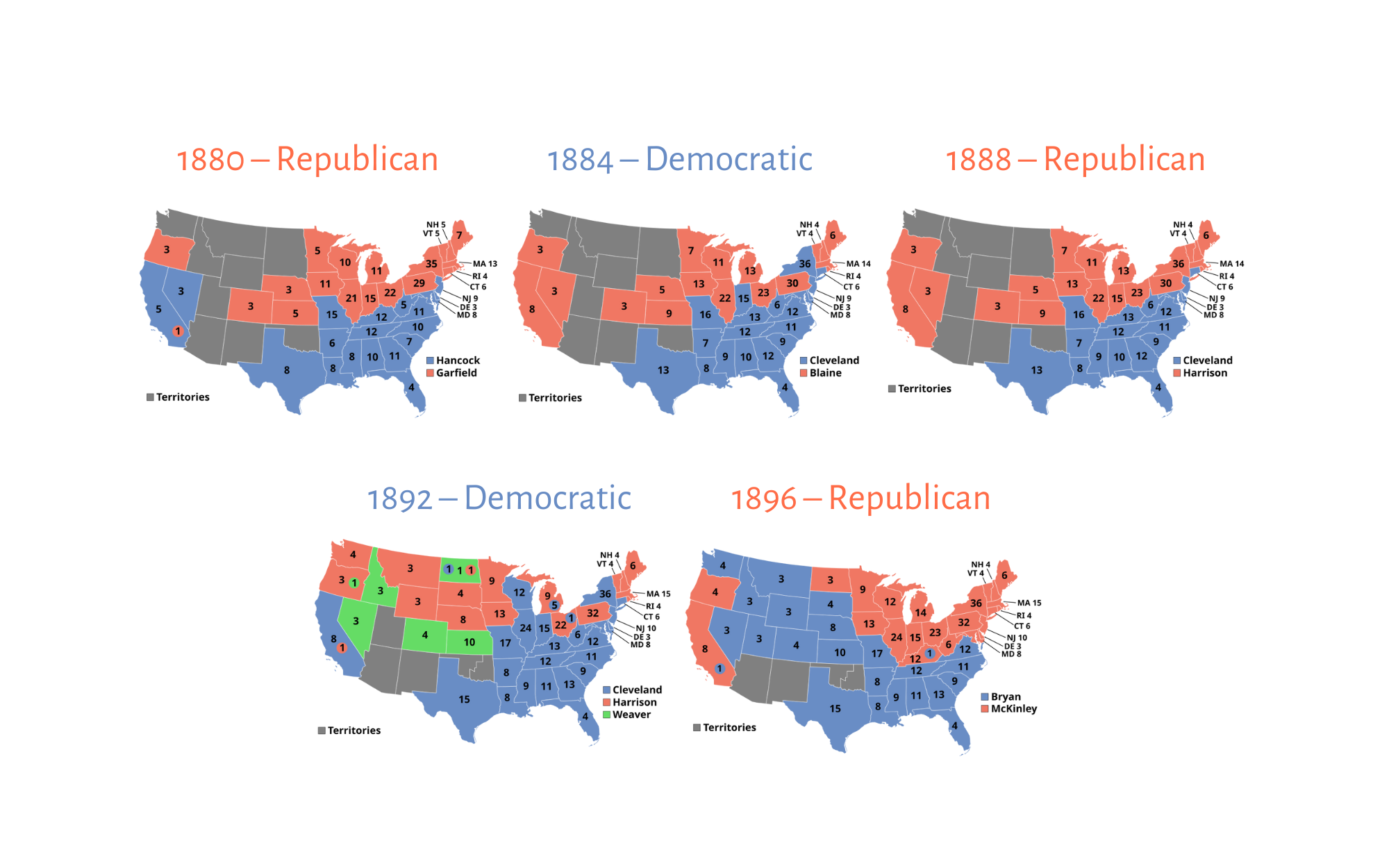
Party control of the US presidency flipped four times from 1880 to 1896 during a period of anti-incumbency.

Eras of anti-incumbent sentiment included the Gilded Age, in which the majority party in the U.S. House of Representatives shifted six times in the 15 Congressional elections between 1870 and 1900, with three of those shifts involving losses of more than 70 seats by the majority party. David M. Kennedy notes, "Generations of American scholars have struggled to find a coherent narrative or to identify heroic leaders in that era's messy and inconclusive political scene."

The 1992 United States elections was also characterized by anti-incumbent sentiment, as a stubborn recession and persistently high unemployment fuelled voter dissatisfaction. A 2013 poll found that 60% of Americans would vote to "defeat and replace every single member of Congress, including [their] own representative" if that option were available.

The 2024 United States presidential election also fueled considerable anti-incumbent sentiment, particularly among Generation Z, primarily due to immigration policy, post-COVID inflation, the Gaza war, and age and health concerns regarding the incumbent president Joe Biden.

The concept of anti-incumbency, at least with regard to U.S. elections, is controversial, since more often voters will punish only one party. Three organizations that supported voting out incumbents were Throw the Hypocritical Rascals Out, Vote Out Incumbents Democracy and Tenure Corrupts.

== Criticism ==
A perceived disadvantage of anti-incumbency, with regard to judicial elections, is that good lawyers will not want to accept what they regard as a revolving-door judgeship. Another criticism of anti-incumbency is that it causes political parties to focus on single-term or short-term policies rather than long-term development.

== See also ==
- Coattail effect – Tendency for a popular candidate to attract votes for other candidates of the same party
- Government trifecta – Political situation in some democratic governments
- Incumbency advantage – A political environment where incumbents tend to win re-election
- Six-year itch – American political pattern
- Wave elections in the United States – Elections in which a political party makes major gains
