= 1816 United States elections =

- ← 1814 1815 1816 1817 1818 → Presidential election year
- Incumbent president: ▌James Madison (DR)
- Next Congress: 15th

Presidential election
- Partisan control: Democratic-Republican hold
- Electoral vote
- James Monroe (DR): 183
- Rufus King (F): 34
- 1816 presidential election results. Green denotes states won by Monroe, burnt orange denotes states won by King. Numbers indicate the number of electoral votes allotted to each state.

Senate elections
- Overall control: Democratic-Republican hold
- Seats contested: 12 of 36 seats
- Net seat change: Democratic-Republican +2

House elections
- Overall control: Democratic-Republican hold
- Seats contested: All 184 voting members
- Net seat change: Democratic-Republican +25

Elections for the 15th United States Congress were held in 1816 and 1817. Mississippi and Illinois were admitted as states during the 15th Congress. The election took place during the First Party System. The Democratic-Republican Party controlled the presidency and both houses of Congress, while the Federalist Party provided only limited opposition. The election marked the start of the Era of Good Feelings, as the Federalist Party became nearly irrelevant in national politics after the War of 1812 and the Hartford Convention.

In the presidential election, Democratic-Republican Secretary of State James Monroe easily defeated Federalist Senator Rufus King of New York. Monroe faced a more difficult challenge in securing his party's nomination, but was able to defeat Secretary of War William H. Crawford in the Democratic-Republican congressional nominating caucus. The Federalists never again fielded a presidential candidate.

In the House, Democratic-Republicans won major gains, and continued to dominate the chamber.

In the Senate, Democratic-Republicans picked up a moderate number of seats, increasing their already-dominant majority.

== See also ==
- 1816 United States presidential election
- 1816–17 United States House of Representatives elections
- 1816–17 United States Senate elections
