= Coattails =

Coattails may refer to:

- the Coattail effect
- the tails of a tailcoat
