= 1818 United States elections =

- ← 1816 1817 1818 1819 1820 → Midterm elections
- Incumbent president: ▌James Monroe (DR)
- Next Congress: 16th

Senate elections
- Overall control: Democratic-Republican hold
- Seats contested: 14 of 42 seats
- Net seat change: Democratic-Republican +3

House elections
- Overall control: Democratic-Republican hold
- Seats contested: All 186 voting seats
- Net seat change: Democratic-Republican +13

Elections occurred in the middle of Democratic-Republican President James Monroe's first term, during the First Party System and the Era of Good Feelings. Members of the 16th United States Congress were chosen in this election. During the 16th Congress, Alabama and Maine joined the union. Democratic-Republicans continued to dominate both chambers of Congress, and slightly increased their majority in both houses of Congress in this election.

== See also ==
- 1818–19 United States House of Representatives elections
- 1818–19 United States Senate elections
