= 1998 United States state legislative elections =

- November 3, 1998

86 legislative chambers in 46 states
	Majority party	Minority party	Third party
Party	Democratic	Republican	Coalition
Last election	50	47	1
Chambers before	48	49 (Note: Republicans took control of the Virginia Senate and Wisconsin Senate, as forcing a tie in the Virginia House of Delegates, early in the year through special elections.)	1
Chambers after	50	46 (Note: The Washington House of Representatives became controlled by a power-sharing agreement between Democrats and Republicans.)	1
Overall change	▲2	▼3	Steady
- Map of upper house elections: Democrats gained control Democrats retained control Republicans gained control Republicans retained control Coalition retained control No regularly-scheduled elections

- Map of lower house elections: Democrats gained control Democrats retained control Republicans gained control Republicans retained control Split body formed No regularly-scheduled elections

The 1998 United States state legislative elections were held on November 3, 1998, alongside other elections. Elections were held for 86 legislative chambers in 46 states.

Despite hopes of winning a majority of state legislatures for the first time since 1954 after a decade of steady gains, Republicans only flipped two chambers in the Midwest while losing control of six. Democrats flipped five of those, while the Washington House of Representatives becoming tied. Republicans had also forced a tie in the Virginia House of Delegates and gained control of the Virginia Senate early in the year in special elections.
