= 1790 United States Senate election in Delaware =

United States Senate election in Delaware, 1790
- October 23, 1790
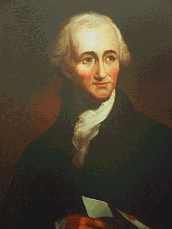
Nominee	George Read
Party	Pro-Administration
Electoral vote	30
Percentage	100%
Elected U.S. Senator
George Read
Pro-Administration

The United States Senate election in Delaware for 1790 was held on October 23, 1790. George Read was elected unanimously by the state legislature.

== Results ==
United States Senate election in Delaware, 1790
Party	Candidate	Votes	%
Pro-Administration	George Read	30	100%
Total votes		30	100%
