= 1998 United States elections =

- ← 1996 1997 1998 1999 2000 → Midterm elections
- Election day: November 3
- Incumbent president: ▌Bill Clinton (D)
- Next Congress: 106th

Senate elections
- Overall control: Republican hold
- Seats contested: 34 of 100 seats
- Net seat change: 0
- 1998 Senate election results Democratic hold Republican hold Democratic gain Republican gain

House elections
- Overall control: Republican hold
- Seats contested: All 435 voting seats
- Popular vote margin: Republican +1.1%
- Net seat change: Democratic +5
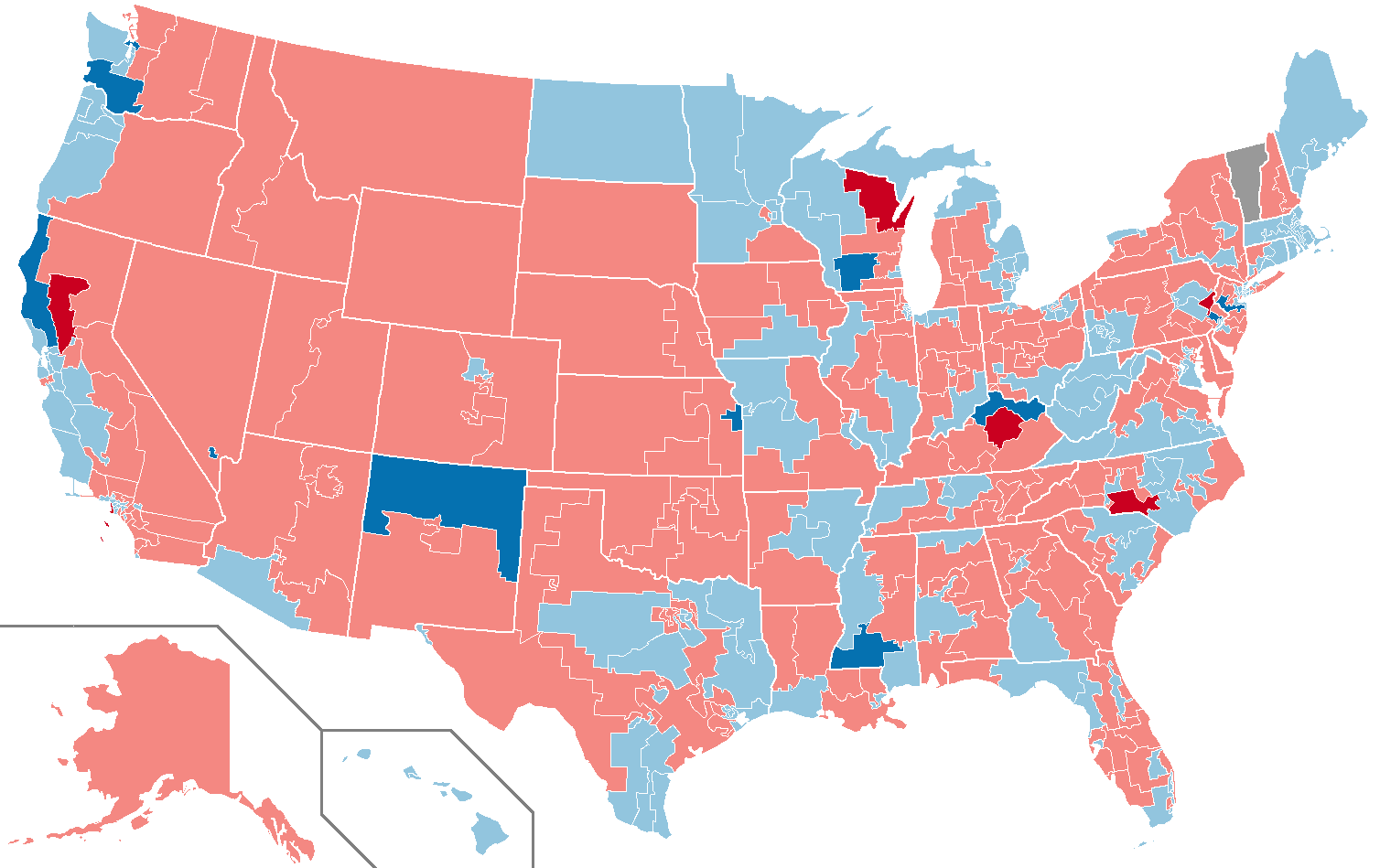
- 1998 House of Representatives results (territorial delegate races not shown) Democratic hold Republican hold Democratic gain Republican gain Independent hold

Gubernatorial elections
- Seats contested: 38 (36 states, 2 territories)
- Net seat change: Reform +1
- 1998 gubernatorial election results Democratic hold Republican hold Democratic gain Republican gain Reform gain Independent hold

Elections were held on November 3, 1998, in the middle of Democratic President Bill Clinton's second term and during impeachment proceedings against the president as a result of the Clinton–Lewinsky scandal. The Republicans retained control of both chambers of Congress.

Despite the Republican victory, this election cycle was unusual because the Democrats made a net gain of five seats in the House of Representatives, while neither party made a net gain in the Senate despite several seats changing hands. As a result, this is the first time since 1934 that the incumbent president's party did not suffer net losses in either house of Congress; this occurred again in 2002.

The disruption of the six-year itch is attributed to wide opposition to the impeachment investigations against Clinton and his high popularity numbers.

== Federal elections ==
=== Senate elections ===
In the Senate elections, Republicans picked up open seats in Ohio and Kentucky and narrowly defeated Democratic incumbent Carol Moseley Braun (Illinois), but these were cancelled out by the Democrats' gain of an open seat in Indiana and defeats of Republican Senators Al D'Amato (New York) and Lauch Faircloth (North Carolina). The balance of the Senate remained unchanged at 55–45 in favor of the Republicans.

=== House of Representatives elections ===
The House of Representatives elections saw a significant disruption of the historic six-year itch trend, where the president's party loses seats in the second-term midterm elections. Though Republicans won the national popular vote for the House by a margin of 1.1 percentage points and retained control of the chamber, Democrats picked up a net of five seats. This marked the second time since the Civil War in which the president's party gained seats in the House of Representatives in a midterm election, following the 1934 elections. Republicans would later gain seats during the 2002 mid-terms. The 1998 elections were the first time since 1822 in which the president's party gained seats in the House during the president's second midterm.

The impeachment of Clinton likely played a major role in the success of the Democratic Party in the House and Senate elections. The election precipitated a change in Republican leadership, with Newt Gingrich resigning as Speaker of the House. A 2001 study by Emory University political scientist Alan Abramowitz attributes the Republican Party's poor performance in the 1998 elections to a public backlash against Republicans' handling of the Clinton-Lewinsky scandal and the impeachment proceedings against President Clinton.

== State elections ==
=== Gubernatorial elections ===
Neither party made net gains in governorships. Texas Governor George W. Bush's landslide re-election solidified his status as a front-runner for the 2000 Republican presidential nomination.
