= 1791 United States Senate election in New York =

- January 19, 1791
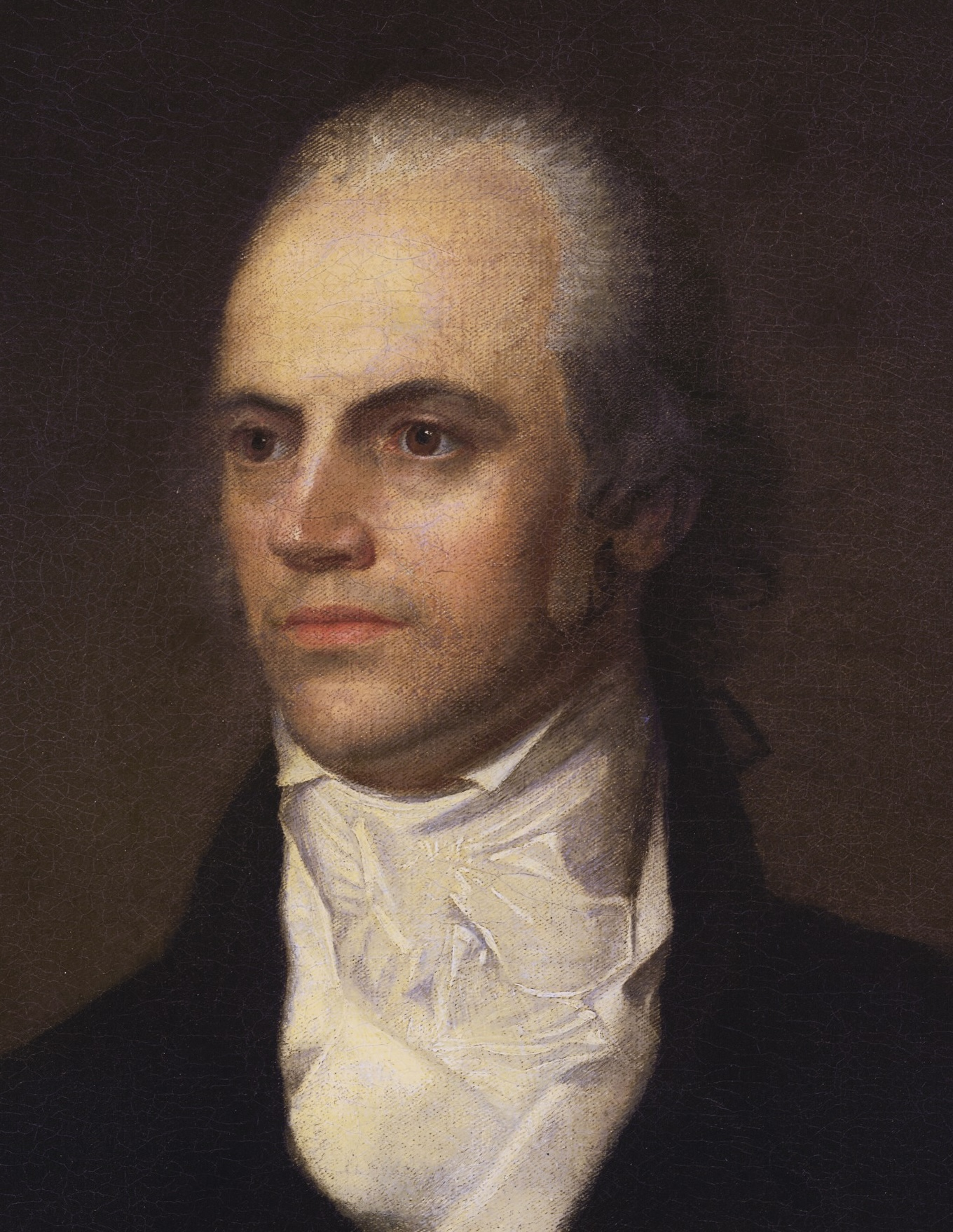
| Candidate | Aaron Burr |
| Party | Independent |
| Senate Vote | 14–4 |
| % Approval | 77.78% |
| House Vote | 32–27 |
| % Approval | 54.24% |
U.S. senator before election
Philip Schuyler
Federalist
Elected U.S. senator
Aaron Burr
Independent Jeffersonian

The 1791 United States Senate election in New York was held on January 19, 1791, by the New York State Legislature to elect a U.S. senator (Class 1) to represent the State of New York in the United States Senate. The election was conducted by a system of approval voting.

Incumbent Senator Philip Schuyler was not re-elected. Aaron Burr, Attorney General of New York, won majority support in both the State Senate and State Assembly to succeed him.

== Background ==
In July 1789, Philip Schuyler and Rufus King had been elected to the U.S. Senate. Schuyler had drawn the short term which would expire on March 3, 1791.

At the State election in April 1790, nominal Federalist majorities were elected to both houses of the 14th New York State Legislature, but many Federalists were friendly to the Democratic-Republican Governor George Clinton, party lines not being drawn very strictly.

== Candidates ==
- Egbert Benson, U.S. Representative
- Aaron Burr, Attorney General of New York
- Philip Schuyler, incumbent Senator

Schuyler, the incumbent, and Benson were both Federalists. Burr was not affiliated with the Federalist Party but was considered a moderate member of the emergent Jeffersonian faction that would coalesce as the Democratic-Republican Party the next year.

== Result ==
Burr was declared elected after receiving a majority of "Yeas" in each chamber of the legislature. Schuyler and Benson were both rejected by the Assembly and no vote was taken on either in the Senate.

The incumbent Schuyler was defeated, despite the nominal majority of his party. Many of the Federalists took the opportunity to show their disapproval of both Schuyler's haughtiness and the financial policies of Alexander Hamilton, the U.S. Secretary of the Treasury and Schuyler's son-in-law. Besides, the Livingston faction of the Federalist Party felt betrayed after the election of Rufus King over their candidate James Duane in 1789, and now allied themselves with Clinton and later became Democratic-Republicans.

1791 United States Senate election result
| House | | Aaron Burr | Philip Schuyler | Egbert Benson |
|---|---|---|---|---|
| State Senate (23 members) | Yea | 14 | | |
| State Senate (23 members) | Nay | 4 | | |
| State Assembly (65 members) | Yea | 32 | 27 | 24 |
| State Assembly (65 members) | Nay | 27 | 32 | 35 |

== Aftermath ==
After a one-day special session of the U.S. Senate on March 4, 1791, the 2nd United States Congress convened for the regular session on October 24, 1791, at Congress Hall in Philadelphia. On November 8, 1791, the State's Council of Appointments declared the office of attorney general vacant, and appointed Morgan Lewis to succeed Burr.

== In popular culture ==
The song "Schuyler Defeated" from the 2015 musical Hamilton focuses on Hamilton confronting Burr following the election.

== Sources ==
- The New York Civil List compiled in 1858 (see: pg. 114 for State Senators 1790–91; page 165f for Members of Assembly 1790–91)
- History of Political Parties in the State of New-York by Jabez Delano Hammond (pages 50ff)
- The Life and Times of Aaron Burr by James Parton (1866, pages 177ff)
