= 1820 United States elections =

- ← 1818 1819 1820 1821 1822 → Presidential election year
- Incumbent president: ▌James Monroe (DR)
- Next Congress: 17th

Presidential election
- Partisan control: Democratic-Republican hold
- Electoral vote
- James Monroe (DR): 228
- 1820 presidential election results. Numbers indicate the number of electoral votes allotted to each state.

Senate elections
- Overall control: Democratic-Republican hold
- Seats contested: 15 of 46 seats
- Net seat change: Democratic-Republican +1

House elections
- Overall control: Democratic-Republican hold
- Seats contested: All 187 voting members
- Net seat change: Federalist +6

Elections for the 17th United States Congress, were held in 1820 and 1821. The election took place during Era of Good Feelings and the First Party System. Despite the Panic of 1819, the Democratic-Republican Party maintained control of the presidency and both houses of Congress, while the Federalist Party provided only limited opposition. Missouri joined the union during the 17th Congress.

In the presidential election, incumbent Democratic-Republican President James Monroe received no major opposition, although fellow Democratic-Republican John Quincy Adams received one electoral vote. The Federalists did not nominate a presidential candidate, although four Federalists received a scattering of electoral votes for vice president. Monroe joined George Washington as the only presidential candidates who won election without any serious opposition.

In the House, Federalists picked up a small number of seats, but Democratic-Republicans continued to dominate the chamber.

In the Senate, Democratic-Republicans picked up a moderate number of seats, increasing their already-dominant majority.

== See also ==
- 1820 United States presidential election
- 1820–21 United States House of Representatives elections
- 1820–21 United States Senate elections
