= 1790 United States elections =

Elections for the 2nd U.S. Congress

- ← 1788 1789 1790 1791 1792 → Midterm elections
- Incumbent president: George Washington (Independent)
- Next Congress: 2nd

Senate elections
- Overall control: Pro-Administration hold
- Seats contested: 9 of 26 seats
- Net seat change: Pro-Administration +1

House elections
- Overall control: Pro-Administration hold
- Seats contested: All 67 voting seats
- Net seat change: Pro-Administration +3
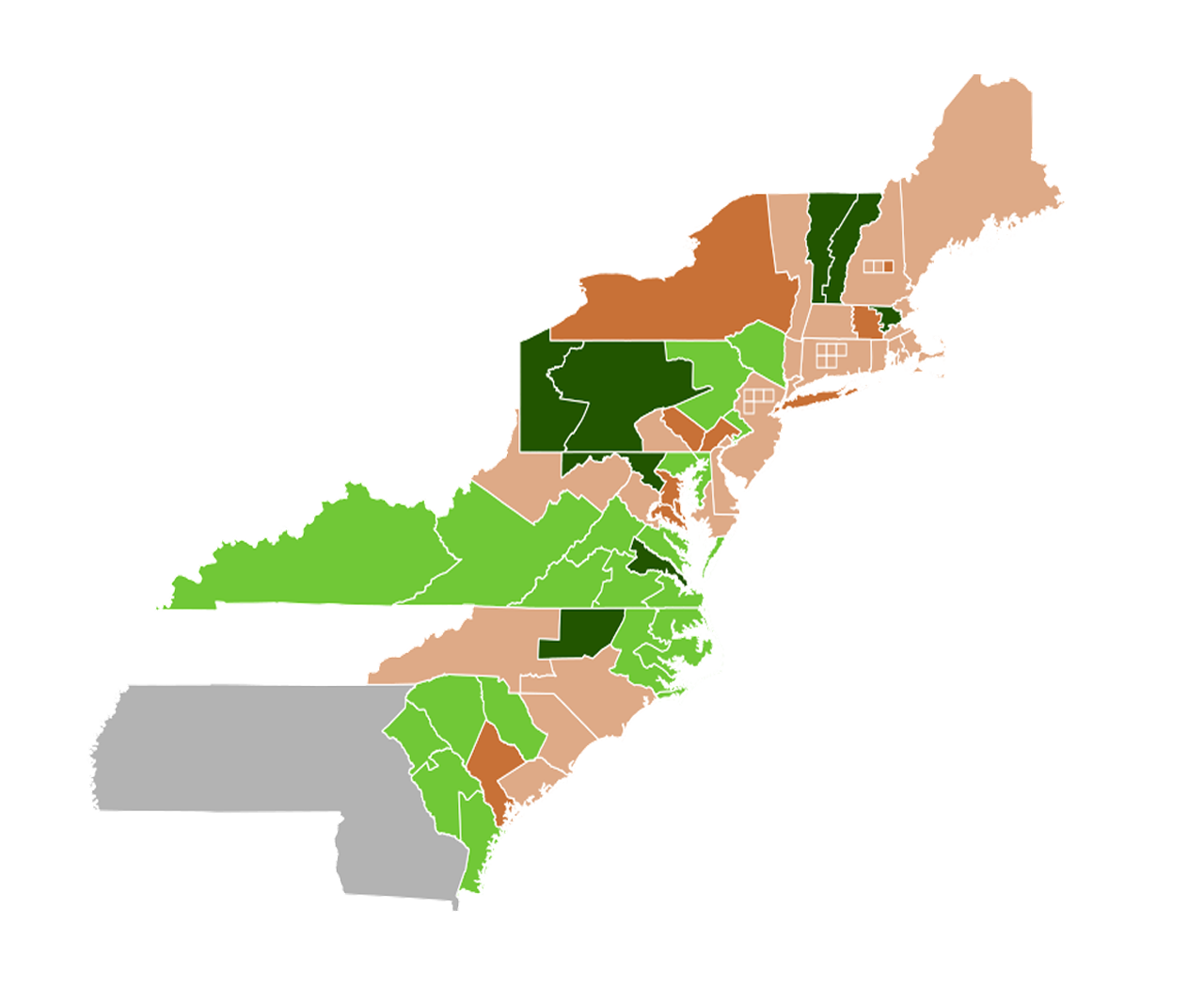
- House of Representative Results: Pro-Administration hold Pro-Administration gain Anti-Administration hold Anti-Administration gain Undistricted

The first midterm elections were held in the United States in 1790 and 1791. They occurred in the middle of President George Washington's first term, and determined the members of the 2nd United States Congress. Formal political parties did not exist, but Congress was broadly divided between a faction supporting the policies of the Washington administration and a faction opposed to those policies. Despite modest gains for the anti-administration faction, the pro-administration faction retained control of both houses of Congress. Vermont and Kentucky joined the union during the 2nd Congress.

== Divisions in the House and the Senate ==
In the House, neither faction made significant gains or losses, and the pro-administration faction retained control of the chamber.

In the Senate, the anti-administration faction picked up a moderate number of seats, but the pro-administration faction narrowly retained control of the chamber.

== See also ==
- 1790–91 United States House of Representatives elections
- 1790–91 United States Senate elections
