= 1791 United States Senate election in Pennsylvania =

In 1791, the Pennsylvania legislature failed to elect a U.S. Senator due to a disagreement on procedure. The seat would remain vacant until 1793.

== See also ==
- List of United States senators from Pennsylvania
- United States Senate elections, 1790 and 1791
