= United States midterm election =

General elections in the United States

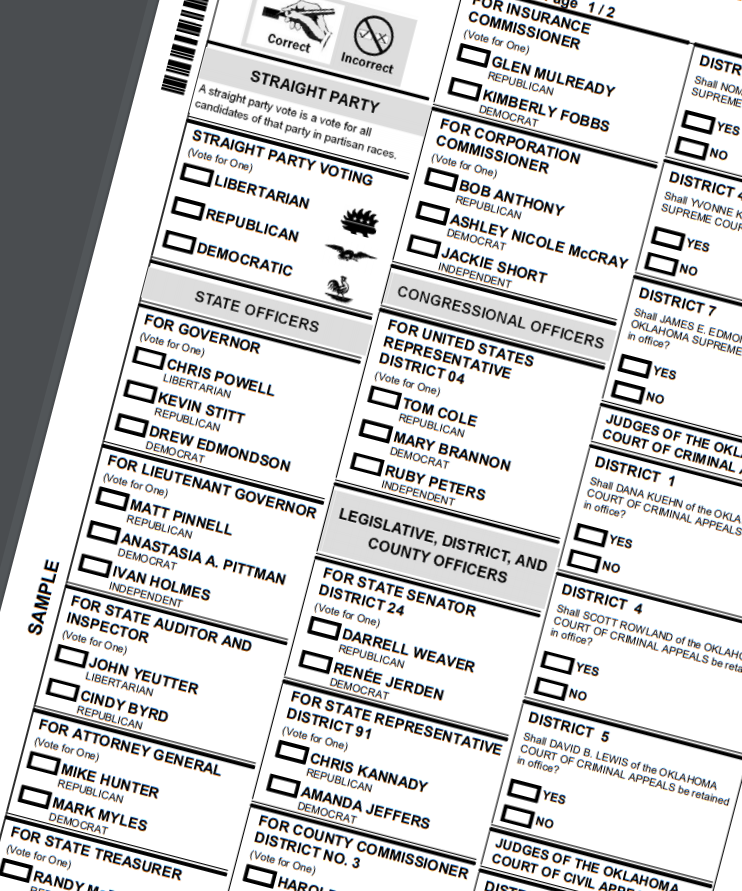
A 2018 Oklahoma general election ballot, listing candidates for state and local offices, as well as those for U.S. Congress

Midterm elections in the United States are the general elections that are held near the midpoint of a president's four-year term of office, on Election Day on the Tuesday after the first Monday in November. Federal offices that are up for election during the midterms include all 435 seats in the United States House of Representatives, and 33 or 34 of the 100 seats in the United States Senate.

Thirty-four of the 50 U.S. states elect their governors for four-year terms during midterm elections. Vermont and New Hampshire elect governors to two-year terms in both midterm and presidential elections. Thus, 36 governors are elected during midterm elections. Many states also elect officers to their state legislatures in midterm years. There are also elections held at the municipal level. On the ballot are many mayors, other local public offices, and a wide variety of citizen and legislatively referred initiatives.

Special elections are often held in conjunction with regular elections, so additional Senators, governors and other local officials may be elected to partial terms.

Midterm elections historically generate lower voter turnout than presidential elections. While presidential elections have had turnouts of about 50–60% over the past 60 years, only about 40% of those eligible to vote go to the polls in midterm elections. Historically, midterm elections often see the president's party lose seats in Congress, and frequently see the president's opposite-party opponents gain control of one or both houses of Congress.

== Background and rationale ==
While Article II, Section 1, Clause 1 of the United States Constitution sets the U.S. president's term of office to four years, Article I, Section 2, Clause 1 sets a two-year term for congressmembers elected to the U.S. House of Representatives. Article I, Section 3, Clause 1 then sets a six-year term for those elected to the U.S. Senate, with Clause 2 dividing the chamber into three "classes", so that approximately one-third of those seats are up for election every two years.

Midterm elections historically generate lower voter turnout than presidential elections, along with a different age, partisan, or racial representation of voters who may also generally vote differently in years without a presidential coattail effect. Media coverage is also typically lower during midterm elections because they lack a single, high-profile race that dominates the national news and public interest. While the national news media may cover the overall party control and the relatively few high-profile races, most of the individual state and local elections must rely on the local news coverage, which has declined in the 21st century due to financial cutbacks and the loss of readership/viewership. Therefore, some state and local governments may hold their races during midterm election years due to the political calculations of incumbent politicians. The lower turnout also benefits well-organized special interest groups that often make up local political machines, making it easier for their favored candidates to capture more of a government.

For other state and local jurisdictions, it may have been because they simply started their four-year cycle at the very first even-numbered year after their constitution or relevant law went into effect, regardless if that was a presidential and midterm year. Still, a number of state and local governments instead schedule their races during odd-numbered "off-years", which historically generate far lower voter turnout than either presidential or midterm years.

== Historical record of midterm ==
Midterm elections are regarded as a referendum on the sitting president's and/or incumbent party's performance. Historically, the lower the president's job approval becomes, the higher the support the opposing party's candidates will receive.

Regardless of the job approval, the party of the incumbent president tends to lose ground during midterm elections because they typically do not have the same surge of turnout and support that occurs as a result of the presidential coattail effect during presidential elections. Since World War II, the president's party has lost an average of 26 seats in the House, and an average of four seats in the Senate.

Since direct public midterm elections were introduced, in only eight of those (under presidents Woodrow Wilson, Franklin D. Roosevelt, John F. Kennedy, Richard Nixon, Bill Clinton, George W. Bush, Donald Trump, and Joe Biden) has the president's party gained seats in the House or the Senate. Of those, only two (1934, Franklin D. Roosevelt, and 2002, George W. Bush) have seen the president's party gain seats in both houses.

The losses suffered during a president's second midterm tend to be more pronounced than during their first midterm, in what is described as a "six-year itch".

Year	Sitting president	President's party	Net gain/loss of president's party (Note: Party shading shows which party controls chamber after that election.)	
Year	Sitting president	President's party	House seats	Senate seats
1790	George Washington	None (Note: Gain/loss numbers are for the Pro-Administration faction (1790) and Federalist Party (1794).)	+3: (37 ► 40)	0: (18 ► 18)
1794	George Washington	None	-4: (51 ► 47)	+3: (16 ► 19)
1798	John Adams	Federalist	+3: (57 ► 60)	0: (22 ► 22)
1802	Thomas Jefferson	Democratic-Republican	+35: (68 ► 103)	+5: (17 ► 22)
1806	Thomas Jefferson	Democratic-Republican	+2: (114 ► 116)	+1: (27 ► 28)
1810	James Madison	Democratic-Republican	+13: (94 ► 107)	0: (26 ► 26)
1814	James Madison	Democratic-Republican	+5: (114 ► 119)	-3: (26 ► 22)
1818	James Monroe	Democratic-Republican	+13: (145 ► 158)	+2: (28 ► 30)
1822	James Monroe	Democratic-Republican	+34: (155 ► 189)	0: (44 ► 44)
1826	John Quincy Adams	Democratic-Republican (Note: Gain/loss numbers are for the anti-Jacksonian faction.)	-9: (109 ► 100)	-2: (21 ► 19)
1830	Andrew Jackson	Democratic (Note: Gain/loss numbers are for the pro-Jacksonian faction.)	-10: (136 ► 126)	+1: (25 ► 26)
1834	Andrew Jackson	Democratic	0: (143 ► 143)	+1: (21 ► 22)
1838	Martin Van Buren	Democratic	-3: (128 ► 125)	-7: (35 ► 28)
1842	John Tyler	None (Note: Tyler was elected on the Whig ticket in 1840 but expelled from the party in 1841. Gain/loss numbers are for the Whig Party.)	-69: (142 ► 73)	-3: (30 ► 27)
1846	James K. Polk	Democratic	-30: (142 ► 112)	+2: (33 ► 35)
1850	Millard Fillmore	Whig	-22: (108 ► 86)	-3: (36 ► 33)
1854	Franklin Pierce	Democratic	-75: (158 ► 83)	-3: (36 ► 33)
1858	James Buchanan	Democratic	-35: (133 ► 98)	-4: (42 ► 38)
1862	Abraham Lincoln	Republican	-23: (108 ► 85)	+1: (31 ► 32)
1866	Andrew Johnson	Democratic	+9: (38 ► 47)	0: (10 ► 10)
1870	Ulysses S. Grant	Republican	-32: (171 ► 139)	-5: (63 ► 58)
1874	Ulysses S. Grant	Republican	-93: (199 ► 106)	-10: (52 ► 42)
1878	Rutherford B. Hayes	Republican	-4: (136 ► 132)	-7: (38 ► 31)
1882	Chester A. Arthur	Republican	-29: (151 ► 118)	0: (37 ► 37)
1886	Grover Cleveland	Democratic	-16: (183 ► 167)	+2: (34 ► 36)
1890	Benjamin Harrison	Republican	-93: (179 ► 86)	-4: (47 ► 43)
1894	Grover Cleveland (Note: Served non-consecutive terms.)	Democratic	-127: (220 ► 93)	-4: (44 ► 40)
1898	William McKinley	Republican	-21: (205 ► 189)	+6: (44 ► 50)
1902	Theodore Roosevelt	Republican	+9: (201 ► 210)	0: (55 ► 55)
1906	Theodore Roosevelt	Republican	-27: (251 ► 224)	+2: (58 ► 60)
1910	William Howard Taft	Republican	-56: (219 ► 163)	-9: (59 ► 50)
1914	Woodrow Wilson	Democratic	-61: (291 ► 230)	+3: (50 ► 53)
1918	Woodrow Wilson	Democratic	-22: (214 ► 192)	-4: (52 ► 48)
1922	Warren G. Harding	Republican	-77: (302 ► 225)	-7: (60 ► 53)
1926	Calvin Coolidge	Republican	-9: (247 ► 238)	-6: (56 ► 50)
1930	Herbert Hoover	Republican	-52: (270 ► 218)	-8: (56 ► 48)
1934	Franklin D. Roosevelt	Democratic	+9: (313 ► 322)	+9: (60 ► 69)
1938	Franklin D. Roosevelt	Democratic	-72: (334 ► 262)	-7: (75 ► 68)
1942	Franklin D. Roosevelt	Democratic	-45: (267 ► 222)	-8: (65 ► 57)
1946	Harry S. Truman	Democratic	-54: (242 ► 188)	-11: (56 ► 45)
1950	Harry S. Truman	Democratic	-28: (263 ► 235)	-5: (54 ► 49)
1954	Dwight D. Eisenhower	Republican	-18: (221 ► 203)	-2: (49 ► 47)
1958	Dwight D. Eisenhower	Republican	-48: (201 ► 153)	-13: (47 ► 34)
1962	John F. Kennedy	Democratic	-4: (262 ► 258)	+4: (64 ► 68)
1966	Lyndon B. Johnson	Democratic	-47: (295 ► 248)	-3: (67 ► 64)
1970	Richard Nixon	Republican	-12: (192 ► 180)	+2: (43 ► 45)
1974	Gerald Ford	Republican	-48: (192 ► 144)	-4: (42 ► 38)
1978	Jimmy Carter	Democratic	-15: (292 ► 277)	-2: (61 ► 59)
1982	Ronald Reagan	Republican	-26: (192 ► 166)	0: (54 ► 54)
1986	Ronald Reagan	Republican	-5: (182 ► 177)	-8: (53 ► 45)
1990	George H. W. Bush	Republican	-8: (175 ► 167)	-1: (45 ► 44)
1994	Bill Clinton	Democratic	-54: (258 ► 204)	-8: (56 ► 48)
1998	Bill Clinton	Democratic	+4: (207 ► 211)	0: (45 ► 45)
2002	George W. Bush	Republican	+8: (221 ► 229)	+2: (49 ► 51)
2006	George W. Bush	Republican	-32: (231 ► 199)	-6: (55 ► 49)
2010	Barack Obama	Democratic	-63: (256 ► 193)	-6: (59 ► 53)
2014	Barack Obama	Democratic	-13: (201 ► 188)	-9: (55 ► 46)
2018	Donald Trump	Republican	-41: (241 ► 200)	+2: (51 ► 53)
2022	Joe Biden	Democratic	-9: (222 ► 213)	+1: (50 ► 51)
2026	Donald Trump	Republican	TBD	-9: (53 ► 44)

== Comparison with other U.S. general elections ==
Basic rotation of U.S. general elections (fixed terms only^{[1]})
Year	2026	2027	2028	2029	2030
Type	Midterm	Off-year	Presidential	Off-year	Midterm
President	No		Yes	No	
Senate	Class II (33 seats)	No	Class III (34 seats)	No	Class I (33 seats)
House	All 435 seats^{[2]}	No	All 435 seats^{[3]}	No	All 435 seats^{[2]}
Gubernatorial	36 states, DC, & 3 territories^{[4]} AL, AK, AZ, AR, CA, CO, CT, FL, GA, HI, ID, IL, IA, KS, ME, MD, MA, MI, MN, NE, NV, NH, NM, NY, OH, OK, OR, PA, RI, SC, SD, TN, TX, VT, WI, WY, DC (Mayor), GU, MP, VI	3 states KY, LA, MS	11 states, 2 territories DE, IN, MO, MT, NH, NC, ND, UT, VT, WA, WV, AS, PR	2 states NJ, VA	36 states, DC, & 3 territories^{[4]} AL, AK, AZ, AR, CA, CO, CT, FL, GA, HI, ID, IL, IA, KS, ME, MD, MA, MI, MN, NE, NV, NH, NM, NY, OH, OK, OR, PA, RI, SC, SD, TN, TX, VT, WI, WY, DC (Mayor), GU, MP, VI
Lieutenant gubernatorial^{[5]}	10 states^{[6]} AL, AR, CA, GA, ID, NV, OK, RI, TX, VT	2 states LA, MS	5 states, 1 territory DE, MO, NC, VT, WA, AS	1 state VA	10 states^{[6]} AL, AR, CA, GA, ID, NV, OK, RI, TX, VT
Secretary of state	25 states AL, AZ, AR, CA, CO, CT, GA, ID, IL, IN, IA, KS, MA, MI, MN, NE, NV, NM, ND, OH, RI, SC, VT, WI, WY	3 states KY, LA, MS	7 states MO, MT, NC, OR, VT, WA, WV	None	25 states AL, AZ, AR, CA, CO, CT, GA, ID, IL, IN, IA, KS, MA, MI, MN, NE, NV, NM, ND, OH, RI, SC, VT, WI, WY
Attorney general	30 states, DC, & 2 territories AL, AZ, AR, CA, CO, CT, DE, FL, GA, ID, IL, IA, KS, MD, MA, MI, MN, NE, NV, NM, NY, ND, OH, OK, RI, SC, SD, TX, VT, WI, DC, GU, MP	3 states KY, LA, MS	10 states IN, MO, MT, NC, OR, PA, UT, VT, WA, WV	1 state VA	30 states, DC, & 2 territories AL, AZ, AR, CA, CO, CT, DE, FL, GA, ID, IL, IA, KS, MD, MA, MI, MN, NE, NV, NM, NY, ND, OH, OK, RI, SC, SD, TX, VT, WI, WY, DC, GU, MP
State treasurer^{[7]}	23 states AL, AZ, AR, CA, CO, CT, FL (CFO), ID, IL, IN, IA, KS, MA, NE, NV, NM, OH, OK, RI, SC, VT, WI, WY	3 states KY, LA, MS	9 states MO, NC, ND, OR, PA, UT, VT, WA, WV	None	23 states AL, AZ, AR, CA, CO, CT, FL (CFO), ID, IL, IN, IA, KS, MA, NE, NV, NM, OH, OK, RI, SC, VT, WI, WY
State comptroller/controller	8 states CA, CT, IL, MD, NV, NY, SC, TX	None	None	None	8 states CA, CT, IL, MD, NV, NY, SC, TX
State auditor	15 states AL, AR, DE, IN, IA, MA, MN, MO, NE, NM, OH, OK, SD, VT, WY	2 states KY, MS	9 states MT, NC, ND, PA, UT, VT, WA, WV, GU	None	15 states AL, AR, DE, IN, IA, MA, MN, MO, NE, NM, OH, OK, SD, VT, WY
Superintendent of public instruction	7 states AZ, CA, GA, ID, OK, SC, WY	None	4 states MT, NC, ND, WA	1 state WI	7 states AZ, CA, GA, ID, OK, SC, WY
Agriculture commissioner	6 states AL, FL, GA, IA, ND, SC, TX	3 states KY, LA, MS	2 states NC, WV	None	6 states AL, FL, GA, IA, ND, SC, TX
Insurance commissioner	5 states CA, DE, GA, KS, OK	2 states LA, MS	3 states NC, ND, WA	None	5 states CA, DE, GA, KS, OK
Other commissioners & elected officials	10 states AZ (Mine Inspector), AR (Land), GA (Labor), NM (Land), ND (Tax), OK (Labor), OR (Labor), SD (Land), TX (Land), WA (Land)	None	1 state NC (Labor)	None	10 states AZ (Mine Inspector), AR (Land), GA (Labor), NM (Land), ND (Tax), OK (Labor), OR (Labor), SD (Land), TX (Land), WA (Land)
State legislatures^{[8]}	46 states, DC, & 4 territories AK, AL, AZ, AR, CA, CO, CT, DE, FL, GA, HI, ID, IL, IN, IA, KS, KY, ME, MA, MD, MI, MN, MO, NE, NV, NH, NM, NY, NC, ND, OH, OK, OR, PA, RI, SC, SD, TN, TX, UT, VT, WA, WV, WI, WY, DC, AS, GU, MP, VI	4 states LA, MS, NJ, VA	44 states, DC, & 5 territories AK, AZ, AR, CA, CO, CT, DE, FL, GA, HI, ID, IL, IN, IA, KS, KY, ME, MA, MI, MN, MO, NE, NV, NH, NM, NY, NC, ND, OH, OK, OR, PA, RI, SC, SD, TN, TX, UT, VT, WA, WV, WI, WY, DC, AS, GU, MP, PR, VI	2 states VA. NJ	46 states, DC, & 4 territories AK, AL, AZ, AR, CA, CO, CT, DE, FL, GA, HI, ID, IL, IN, IA, KS, KY, ME, MA, MD, MI, MN, MO, NE, NV, NH, NM, NY, NC, ND, OH, OK, OR, PA, RI, SC, SD, TN, TX, UT, VT, WA, WV, WI, WY, DC, AS, GU, MP, VI
State boards of education^{[9]}	8 states, DC, & 3 territories AL, CO, KS, MI, NE, OH, TX, UT, DC, GU, MP, VI	None	8 states, DC, & 3 territories AL, CO, KS, MI, NE, OH, TX, UT, DC, GU, MP, VI	None	8 states, DC, & 3 territories AL, CO, KS, MI, NE, OH, TX, UT, DC, GU, MP, VI
Other state, local, and tribal offices	Varies				

^{1} This table does not include special elections, which may be held to fill political offices that have become vacant between the regularly scheduled elections.
^{2} As well as all six non-voting delegates of the U.S. House.
^{3} As well as five non-voting delegates of the U.S. House. The resident commissioner of Puerto Rico instead serves a four-year term that coincides with the presidential term.
^{4} The governors of New Hampshire and Vermont are each elected to two-year terms. The other 48 state governors and all five territorial governors serve four-year terms.
^{5} In 26 states and 3 territories the lieutenant governor is elected on the same ticket as the governor: AK, CO, CT, FL, HI, IL, IN, IA, KS, KY, MD, MA, MI, MN, MT, NE, NJ, NM, NY, ND, OH, PA, SC, SD, UT, WI, GU, MP, VI.
^{6} Like the governor, Vermont's other officials are each elected to two-year terms. All other state officers for all other states listed serve four-year terms.
^{7} In some states, the comptroller or controller has the duties equivalent to a treasurer. There are some states with both positions, so both have been included separately.
^{8} This list does not differentiate chambers of each legislature. Forty-nine state legislatures are bicameral; Nebraska is unicameral. Additionally, Washington, DC, Guam, and the US Virgin Islands are unicameral; the other territories are bicameral. All legislatures have varying terms for their members. Many have two-year terms for the lower house and four-year terms for the upper house. Some have all two-year terms and some all four-year terms. Arkansas has a combination of both two- and four-year terms in the same chamber.
^{9} Most states not listed here have a board appointed by the governor and legislature. All boards listed here have members that serve four-year staggered terms, except Colorado, which has six-year terms, and Guam, which has two-year terms. Most are elected statewide, some are elected from districts. Louisiana, Ohio, Guam, and the Northern Mariana Islands have additional members who are appointed.
