= 1817 Connecticut lieutenant gubernatorial election =

- April 7, 1817
Nominee	Jonathan Ingersoll
Party	Toleration
Popular vote	738
Percentage	98.70%
Lieutenant Governor before election
Jonathan Ingersoll
Democratic-Republican
Elected Lieutenant Governor
Jonathan Ingersoll
Toleration

The 1817 Connecticut lieutenant gubernatorial election was held on April 7, 1817, in order to elect the lieutenant governor of Connecticut. Incumbent Toleration lieutenant governor Jonathan Ingersoll won re-election as he ran unopposed with the support of both the Toleration and the Federalist Party.

== General election ==
On election day, April 7, 1817, incumbent Toleration lieutenant governor Jonathan Ingersoll won re-election with 98.70% of the vote as he faced no opposition, thereby retaining Toleration control over the office of lieutenant governor. Ingersoll was sworn in for his second term on May 8, 1817.

=== Results ===
Connecticut lieutenant gubernatorial election, 1817
Party	Candidate	Votes	%
Toleration	Jonathan Ingersoll (incumbent)	738	98.70
	Scattering	10	1.30
Total votes		748	100.00
Toleration hold			
