= 1874 United States elections =

- ← 1872 1873 1874 1875 1876 → Midterm elections
- Election day: November 3
- Incumbent president: ▌Ulysses S. Grant (R)
- Next Congress: 44th

Senate elections
- Overall control: Republican hold
- Seats contested: 25 of 74 seats
- Net seat change: Democratic +9
- Results: Democratic gain Democratic hold Republican hold Anti-Monopoly gain

House elections
- Overall control: Democratic gain
- Seats contested: All 293 voting seats
- Net seat change: Democratic +92
- Results: Democratic hold Democratic gain Republican hold Republican gain Independent hold

Elections occurred in the middle of Republican President Ulysses S. Grant's second term, during the Third Party System. Members of the 44th United States Congress were chosen in this election. The election took place during the Reconstruction Era, and many Southerners were disfranchised. Colorado joined the union during the 44th Congress. The Democrats took control of a chamber of Congress for the first time since 1859, winning a huge number of seats from the House Republicans. However, the Republicans retained a majority in the Senate. The election marked the first occurrence of the six-year itch phenomenon, in which a president's party lost many Congressional seats during the president's second mid-term election.

The Panic of 1873, a series of scandals, and an unpopular Congressional pay raise all damaged the Republican Party's brand. With the passage of the Reconstruction Amendments, the importance of the parties' roles in the Civil War also receded in the minds of many. Though Republicans won governorships in areas of the Northern United States (such as Pennsylvania), the election increased Democratic power in the Southern United States. The Democrats later dominated the region as the Solid South after the end of Reconstruction.

In the House, Democrats won massive gains when the Republicans lost a total of 92 seats (the third-largest swing in the history of the House, and the second-largest House loss by the Republican Party), turning a dominant Republican majority into a similarly dominant Democratic majority.

In the Senate, Democrats picked up several seats, but Republicans retained a commanding majority.

== See also ==
- 1874–75 United States House of Representatives elections
- 1874–75 United States Senate elections
