= 1817 Massachusetts gubernatorial election =

- April 7, 1817
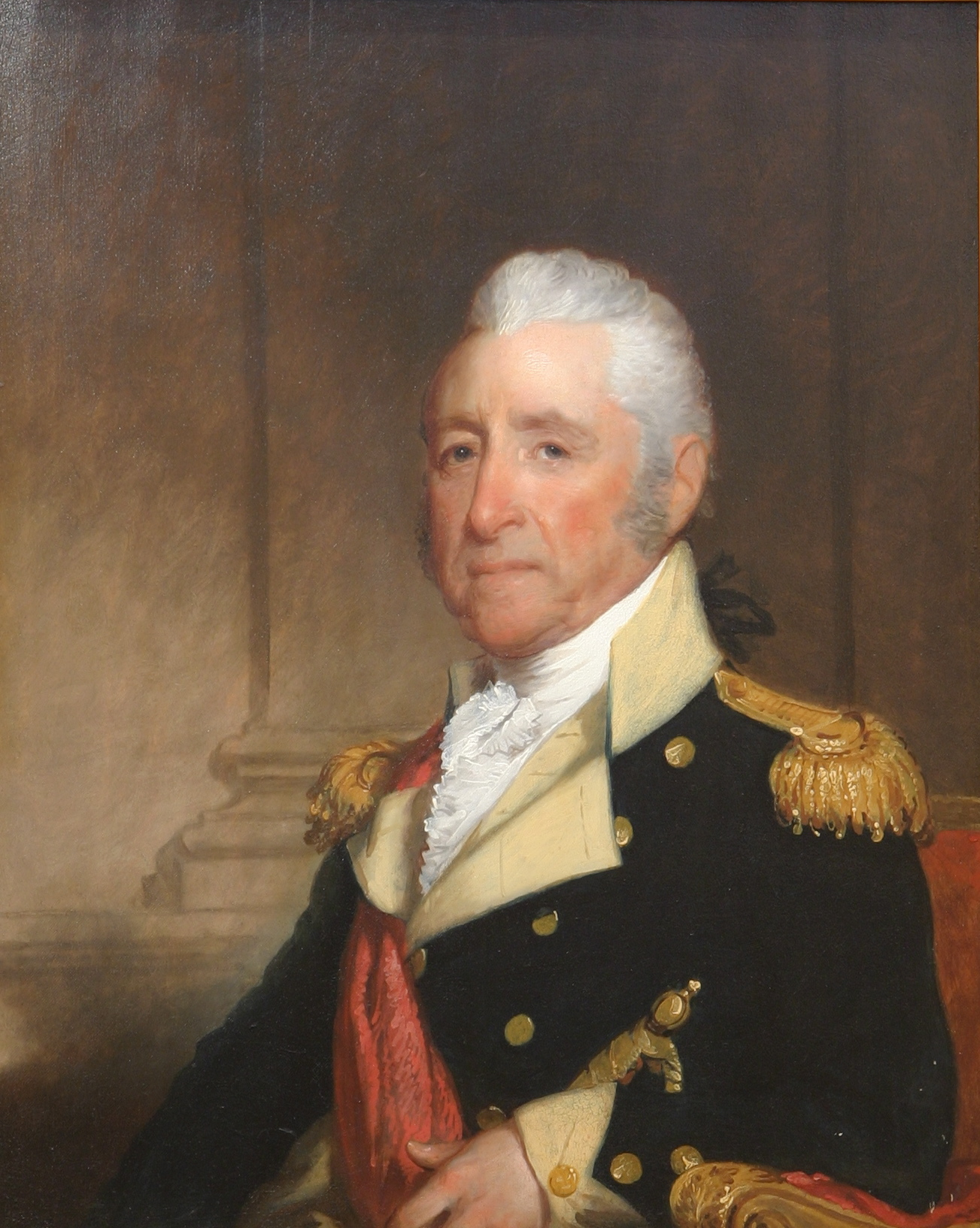

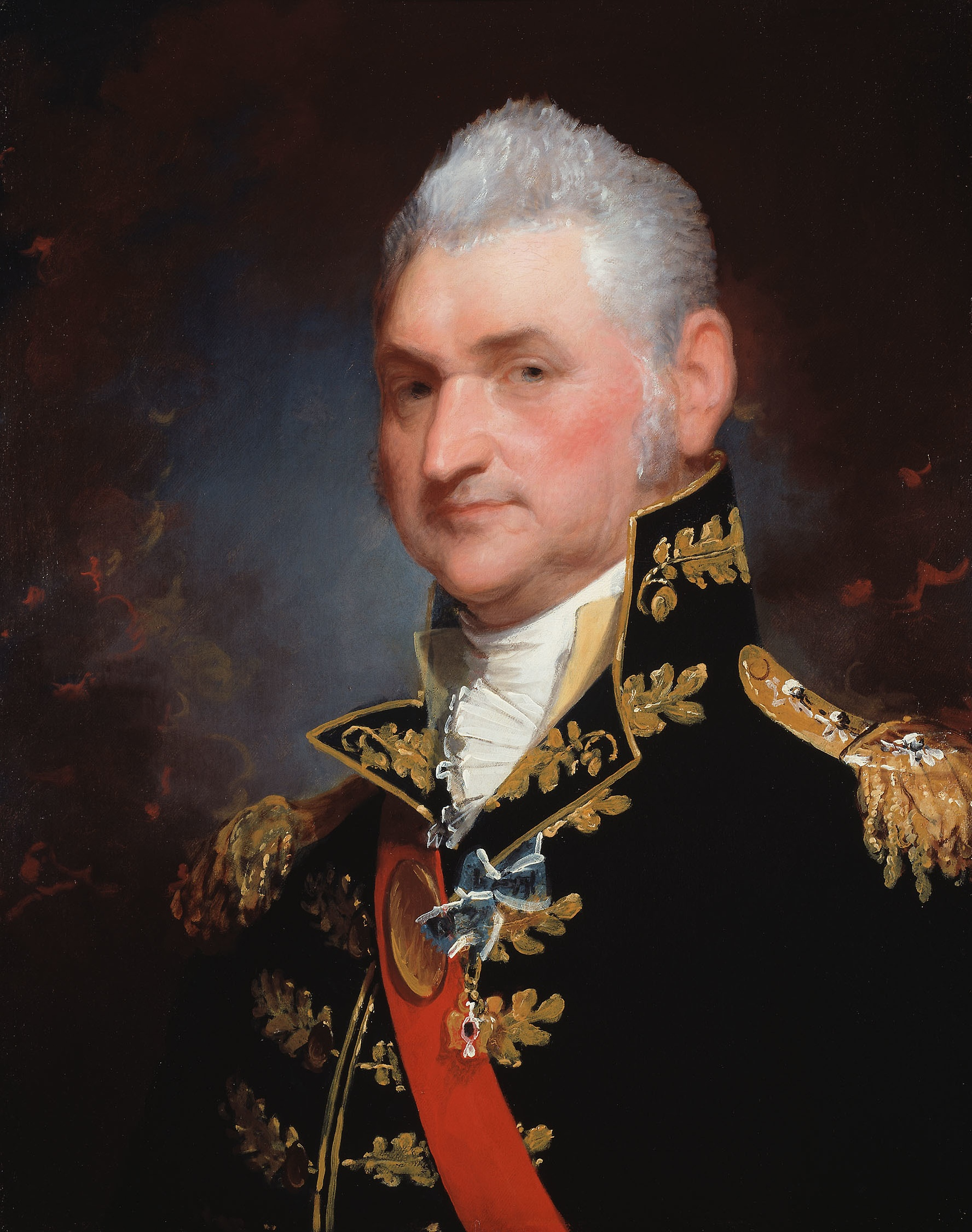
Nominee	John Brooks	Henry Dearborn
Party	Federalist	Democratic-Republican
Popular vote	46,160	38,129
Percentage	54.63%	45.13%
- County results Brooks: 50–60% 60–70% 70–80% 80–90% Dearborn: 50–60% 60–70% 70–80%
Governor before election
John Brooks
Federalist
Elected Governor
John Brooks
Federalist

The 1817 Massachusetts gubernatorial election was held on April 7, 1817, in order to elect the Governor of Massachusetts. Incumbent Federalist Governor John Brooks won re-election against Democratic-Republican candidate and former United States Secretary of War Henry Dearborn.

== General election ==
On election day, April 7, 1817, incumbent Federalist Governor John Brooks won re-election by a margin of 8,031 votes against his opponent Democratic-Republican candidate Henry Dearborn, thereby retaining Federalist control over the office of governor. Brooks was sworn in for his second term on May 31, 1817.

=== Results ===
Massachusetts gubernatorial election, 1817
Party	Candidate	Votes	%
Federalist	John Brooks (incumbent)	46,160	54.63%
Democratic-Republican	Henry Dearborn	38,129	45.13%
	Scattering	207	0.24%
Total votes		84,496	100.00%
Federalist hold			
