= Watergate Babies =

Democrats elected to the U.S. Congress in 1974

The Watergate Babies were Democrats first elected to the United States Congress in the 1974 elections, after President Richard Nixon's resignation over the Watergate scandal, on August 9, 1974.

Democrats picked up 49 seats in the House and 5 in the Senate. This group greatly increased the strength of Northerners and liberals in the House Democratic Caucus. They joined more senior liberals to strike a blow against the seniority system and overthrow three committee chairmen whom they viewed as too conservative and/or too old to represent the caucus: William R. Poage (D-TX), Wright Patman (D-TX), and F. Edward Hébert (D-LA).

Thomas Downey of New York was the youngest among the "babies", aged 25 upon his election, the minimum age at which one may serve in the U.S. House of Representatives. Senators Patrick Leahy (D-VT), Gary Hart (D-CO), John Glenn (D-OH), Dale Bumpers (D-AR), Richard Stone (D-FL), were also elected during this cycle, with future Senators Paul Simon (D-IL), Tom Harkin (D-IA), Paul Tsongas (D-MA), Max Baucus (D-MT), Chris Dodd (D-CT), and Bob Krueger (D-TX) winning seats to the House of Representatives in this election. Leahy was the last Watergate Baby to serve in Congress; he retired in 2023 after 48 years in office. Of the Democratic Senators elected in 1974, Leahy, Hart, Ford, Bumpers, and Glenn would be re-elected to second terms and Stone would lose his primary in 1980.

"Watergate Babies" can also apply to those Democrats elected to state or local office in 1974; political scientist Malcolm Jewell wrote, "Democrats made substantial state legislative gains in a large number of states in 1974, the Watergate election". Numerous states passed sweeping ethics and public disclosure reforms in the aftermath of Watergate.

"Watergate Babies" has also been used to apply to journalists who entered the field because of Watergate. "Watergate," David Baumann wrote, "also created a generation of journalists who were not willing to accept politicians at their word. If the journalists who helped uncover the scandal, Bob Woodward and Carl Bernstein, could expose the crimes of a president, then certainly there were crooked politicians elsewhere. Those journalists believed in investigative reporting and became watchdogs who attempted to keep politicians honest.

== Legacy ==
In 2018, Politico's John A. Lawrence, along with some of the surviving Watergate Babies, reflected on their long-term impact. The magazine concluded that the reforms to the committee structure, and the increased transparency they worked for had permanently changed Congress as an institution. However, those changes had, Lawrence argued, helped contribute to the later rise of the New Right and shaped the polarized political climate of the late 2010s.

The Watergate Babies often framed what had previously been policy goals—such as stronger consumer protection and environmental cleanup—as rights, a discursive tactic that Lawrence noted would later be adopted by conservatives. On the House floor, the new members' willingness to vote as a bloc forced votes on divisive issues that their more senior colleagues had long avoided, another tactic that conservatives successfully emulated. When House sessions began broadcasting on television in 1979, another reform the Babies had sought, a younger conservative, Newt Gingrich, began using after-hours "special orders" to attack Democrats, which gained him the prestige and followers, allowing him to lead the Republican Revolution in 1994, with Gingrich becoming Speaker of the House.

"We came here to take the Bastille," recalled George Miller, who retired in 2015, one of the last Watergate Babies to do so. "We destroyed the institution by turning the lights on."
