= 1817 Maryland gubernatorial election =

- December 8, 1817
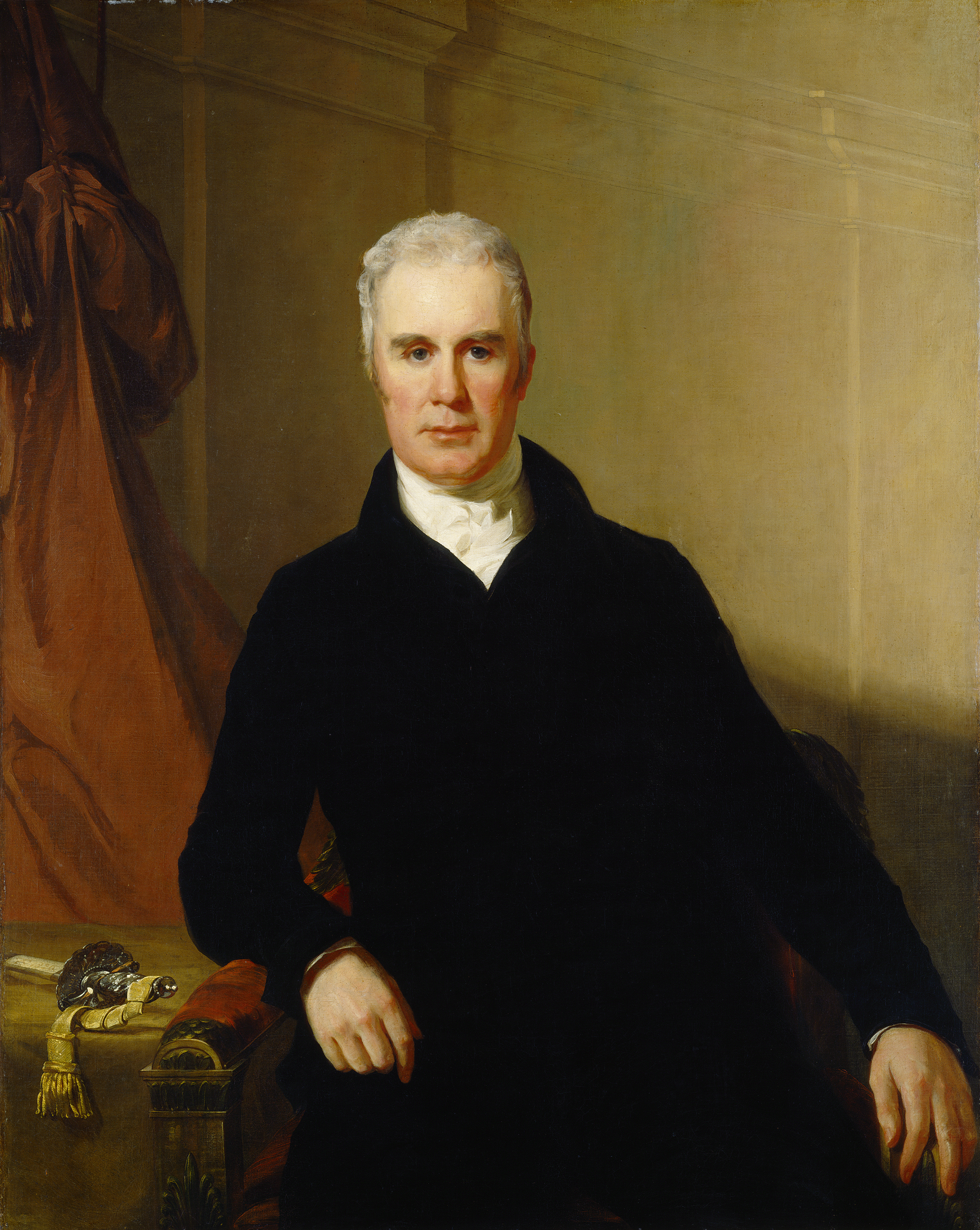

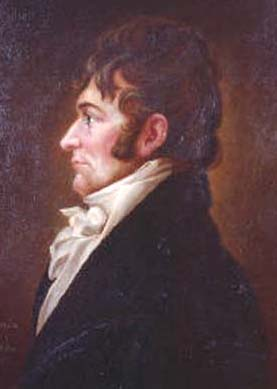
| Nominee | Charles Carnan Ridgely | Robert Bowie |
| Party | Federalist | Democratic-Republican |
| Popular vote | 61 | 7 |
| Percentage | 85.92% | 9.86% |
Governor before election
Charles Carnan Ridgely
Federalist
Elected Governor
Charles Carnan Ridgely
Federalist

The 1817 Maryland gubernatorial election was held on December 8, 1817, in order to elect the governor of Maryland. Incumbent Federalist governor Charles Carnan Ridgely was re-elected by the Maryland General Assembly against former Democratic-Republican governor Robert Bowie, fellow former Democratic-Republican governor Edward Lloyd and former Federalist United States senator Charles Carroll.

== General election ==
On election day, December 8, 1817, incumbent Federalist governor Charles Carnan Ridgely was re-elected by the Maryland General Assembly, thereby retaining Federalist control over the office of governor. Ridgely was sworn in for his third term on January 2, 1818.

=== Results ===
Maryland gubernatorial election, 1817
| Party | Candidate | Votes | % |
|---|---|---|---|
| Federalist | Charles Carnan Ridgely (incumbent) | 61 | 85.92 |
| Democratic-Republican | Robert Bowie | 7 | 9.86 |
| Democratic-Republican | Edward Lloyd | 2 | 2.82 |
| Federalist | Charles Carroll | 1 | 1.40 |
| Total votes | | 71 | 100.00 |
| Federalist hold | | | |
