= 1974 United States elections =

- ← 1972 1973 1974 1975 1976 → Midterm elections
- Election day: November 5
- Incumbent president: ▌Gerald Ford (R)
- Next Congress: 94th

Senate elections
- Overall control: Democratic hold
- Seats contested: 34 of 100 seats
- Net seat change: Democratic +4
- 1974 Senate election results Democratic gain Democratic hold Republican gain Republican hold

House elections
- Overall control: Democratic hold
- Seats contested: All 435 voting seats
- Popular vote margin: Democratic +16.8%
- Net seat change: Democratic +49
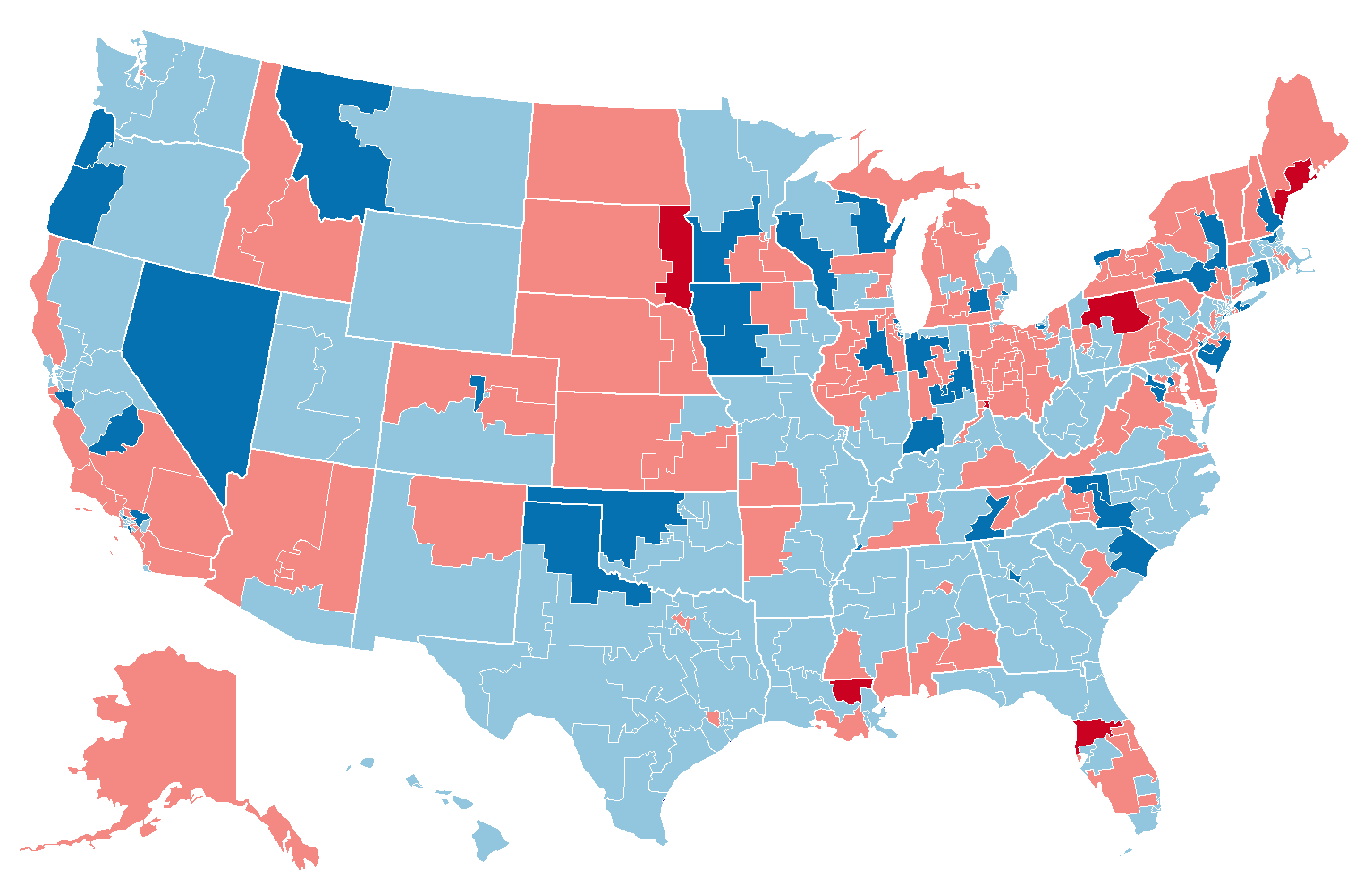
- 1974 House of Representatives election results Democratic gain Democratic hold Republican gain Republican hold

Gubernatorial elections
- Seats contested: 37 (35 states, 2 territories)
- Net seat change: Democratic +4
- 1974 gubernatorial election results Territorial races not shown Democratic gain Democratic hold Republican gain Republican hold Independent gain

Elections were held on November 5, 1974. The elections occurred in the wake of the Watergate scandal and three months into the term of Republican President Gerald Ford. Democrats expanded their majorities in both houses of Congress.

Ford's granting of a pardon to his predecessor, Richard Nixon, along with soaring inflation caused by the 1973 oil crisis, created a tough environment for the Republican Party. Democrats won net gains of four seats in the Senate, 49 seats in the House of Representatives, and four seats in the gubernatorial elections. Many of the newly elected Democrats were Northern liberals, shifting the balance of power away from conservative Southern Democrats.

== Federal elections ==
=== United States Senate ===
The Democrats made a net gain of total four Senate seats from the Republicans. Democrat John A. Durkin won a special election in New Hampshire after the Senate voided the original contested election. After the special election, Democrats possessed 60 seats to 38 for the Republicans, with one independent who caucused with the Democrats and one Conservative who caucused with the Republicans.

=== United States House of Representatives ===
The Democrats won the nationwide popular vote for the House of Representatives by a margin of 16.8 points. This translated to a net gain of 49 seats from the Republicans, increasing the party's majority above the two-thirds mark.

Many of the newly elected Democrats in the House and Senate were liberal northerners (known as Watergate Babies), and the influx of liberals moved power away from the conservative southern Democrats who held most committee chairs in both houses.

== State elections ==
The Democratic Party picked up a net of four seats in the gubernatorial elections and picked up four seats in U.S. Senate as well.
