= 1822 United States elections =

- ← 1820 1821 1822 1823 1824 → Midterm elections
- Incumbent president: ▌James Monroe (DR)
- Next Congress: 18th

Senate elections
- Overall control: Democratic-Republican hold
- Seats contested: 16 of 48 seats
- Net seat change: Federalist -1

House elections
- Overall control: Democratic-Republican hold
- Seats contested: All 213 voting seats
- Net seat change: Democratic-Republican +34

Elections occurred in the middle of Democratic-Republican President James Monroe's second term, and was the last election of the First Party System. Members of the 18th United States Congress were chosen in this election. The 1820 census added 26 seats to the House. The Democratic-Republicans continued to dominate both chambers of Congress.

== See also ==
- 1822–23 United States House of Representatives elections
- 1822–23 United States Senate elections
