= Coattail effect =

Tendency for a popular candidate to attract votes for other candidates of the same party

The coattail effect or down-ballot effect is the tendency for a popular political party leader to attract votes for other candidates of the same party in an election. For example, in the United States, the party of a victorious presidential candidate will often win many seats in Congress as well; these Members of Congress are voted into office "on the coattails" of the president.

This theory is prevalent at all levels of government. Popular statewide candidates for governor or senator can also attract support for down ballot races of their party.

This is prevalent in the United Kingdom and Canada especially in a general election. People have a tendency to vote based on a political party instead of the MP for their area.

This also refers to the phenomenon that same-party members of the U.S. Senate or House of Representatives are more likely to be voted for on a year of the presidential election than a midterm.

The "coattail effect" is not usually caused by popular candidates convincing swing voters to cast their ballots for their party, although this is not unheard of. Rather, the effect often stems from popular candidates driving voter turnout among their own party base, people who are likely to vote for down-ballot party candidates anyway.

The "coattail effect" has also been used to derogatorily describe the effect of Group Representation Constituencies (GRCs) in Singapore, where candidates for Parliament run on a party slate of 3 to 6 candidates. This allows weak candidates to get elected "riding on the coattails" of strong candidates on their slate.

Riding the coattails can be used as a generic metaphor that refers to one who achieves some level of success or notability primarily through association with someone else.

== Presidential coattails ==
Presidential coattails is the ability of a presidential candidate to bring out supporters who then vote for his party's candidates for other offices. In effect, the other candidates are said to ride on the presidential candidate's coattails.

=== In the United States ===
Before the introduction of the secret ballot in the late 19th century, voters cast their ballots by taking a ticket provided by a party worker and putting it in the ballot box. The party-column ballot listed all candidates of the party in a single column and allowed the voter to mark off the party box at the top, which encouraged straight-party voting and the coattails effect. Straight-party voting was the norm, and winners in presidential elections often had long coattails. They almost always began their term with majorities in the House and Senate.

In modern times voting machines have replaced the party-column ballot with the office-column ballot: candidates are grouped by office rather than party. Often there is no way to cast a party-line vote, and each office must be voted on separately. The proportion of voters choosing House and presidential candidates of different parties increased from 13 percent in 1952 to more than 40 percent in the elections of 1972, 1984, and 1988. Consequently, Presidential coattails were virtually eliminated in those elections, and a number of Presidents, including Richard Nixon, Ronald Reagan, and George H. W. Bush, have begun their terms with one or both chambers of Congress controlled by the opposition party.

Presidents may suffer from a "reverse coattail" effect in which their party's candidates for the House or Senate get more votes than the presidents themselves. In 1976, for example, Jimmy Carter won the White House with 40,831,881 votes, but Democratic candidates for the House that year received 41,749,411 votes. In 1992, almost all Democrats elected to Congress won more votes in their congressional districts than the party's presidential candidate, Bill Clinton; that may have had to do with the presence of a strong third-party presidential candidate, Ross Perot.

There is also the "negative coattail" effect in which a controversial presidential candidate may hurt candidates on the party's ticket running for lower offices. Barry Goldwater's poor showing in the presidential election of 1964 led to the defeat of dozens of Republicans in the House of Representatives, leaving Johnson a large Democratic majority to pass his agenda. Additionally, Donald Trump's refusal to concede the 2020 election has been cited as a key factor for Democrats sweeping the runoffs for both Senate races in Georgia, giving Democrats control of the Senate. The negative coattail effect is also common in midterm elections - when a President associated with unpopular policies is not up for re-election, the electorate will often respond by punishing Congressional candidates from the President's own party. The Presidential elections of 1948 and 1952 are the most recent elections in which the same party both won the White House and took control of the House from their opponents. Since 1952, control of the House has changed hands seven times, all of which were in midterm elections (1954, 1994, 2006, 2010, 2018, 2022, and 2026) and all of which were at the expense of the incumbent President's party.

Since the end of World War II, there have been a total of five American presidential elections that had coattail effects: Harry Truman in 1948, Dwight Eisenhower in 1952, Lyndon Johnson in 1964, Ronald Reagan in 1980, and Barack Obama in 2008.

A 2025 study found limited coattail effects in the United States.

==== Statewide level ====
Coattail effects have also been observed on a statewide level. In 2022, Josh Shapiro's landslide victory in the 2022 Pennsylvania gubernatorial election has been cited as a key factor to Democrats winning the 2022 Pennsylvania House of Representatives elections. Similarly, Gretchen Whitmer's landslide win in the 2022 Michigan gubernatorial election has been cited as a key factor to Democrats winning both the 2022 Michigan House of Representatives election and 2022 Michigan Senate election, winning their first trifecta in the state in decades.

In 2026, following an even bigger landslide victory by Shapiro, Democrats in Pennsylvania established a trifecta by flipping the state senate, the first Democratic trifecta in Pennsylvania since 1993. Additionally, Gina Hinojosa’s victory in the 2026 Texas gubernatorial election was also cited as a factor for Democrats winning the 2026 Texas House of Representatives election.

=== In the French Fifth Republic ===
Since the office of President of France was re-established under the Third Republic, the presidential term ran for seven years. While the Presidents of the Third and Fourth republics were ceremonial figureheads, the Fifth Republic's constitution brought together a president with considerable executive powers and a prime minister, responsible before Parliament. The president's task was primarily to end deadlock and act decisively to avoid the stagnation prevalent under the French Fourth Republic; the prime minister, similarly, was to "direct the work of government", providing a strong leadership to the legislative branch and to help overcome partisan squabbles.

Since 1962, French presidents have been elected by popular vote, replacing the electoral college, which was only used once. This change was intended to give Fifth Republic presidents more power than they might have had under the original constitution. While still seen as the symbol and embodiment of the nation, the president also was given a popular mandate. Of course, the majority party of the National Assembly retained power as well, but since the popularly elected president appointed the prime minister (subject to the approval of the National Assembly), the former was seen as having the upper hand in any conflict between executive and legislature. Furthermore, the imbalance is further illustrated by the fact that the president can dissolve the Assembly at any time (but not more than once in a year), whereas the legislature has no powers of removal against the president.

However, even after direct presidential elections were introduced, the presidential term remained at seven years, while the National Assembly's term ran for five. The term imbalance could not guarantee that the President's preferred Prime Minister would enjoy a parliamentary majority, and a risk of cohabitation - a situation of divided government where ideological rivals hold the Presidency and the Premiership - loomed. For this reason, a constitutional amendment to shorten the presidential term to five years was adopted in 2000.

After the 2000 amendment, Presidential and national assembly elections were merely two months apart. This resulted in a noticeable coattail effect, where the President's party gains a majority in the National Assembly, even in 2002 (where the Socialist candidate, Lionel Jospin, favored to win in a run-off between him and incumbent Jacques Chirac, was placed third in the first round, with the actual run-off resulting in a landslide for Chirac against far-right candidate Jean-Marie Le Pen) and 2017 (where the presidential race's winner, Emmanuel Macron, ran under the banner of En Marche! - formed in 2016 - instead of an established party).

== Group representation constituencies ==
Singapore introduced the GRC system in 1988, where candidates for Parliament run and are elected on a slate between 3 and 6 candidates in some constituencies, with a minimum of one minority candidate on each slate. The purported aim was to ensure minority representation in Parliament, and to fully utilize the Town Council scheme introduced two years prior. However, it resulted in a "coattail effect" where unpopular and even unknown candidates are elected (or in cases, via a walkover) alongside some prominent figures or cabinet ministers.

Despite the official reason cited, it was later stated by former Prime Minister Goh Chok Tong that it was used to recruit able people to join politics, particularly since the GRC system reduced the losses of the ruling party. Though the People's Action Party maintains almost total dominance in Parliament with the GRC system, the first loss for any GRC to the opposition was in 2011; as of 2025, there were only 10 fully elected Opposition MPs in the 97-seat Parliament, comprising one constituency and two GRCs.

== See also ==
- Government trifecta
- Reagan's coattails
- Straight-ticket voting
- Wave election
- Lead-in and lead-out (in broadcasting)
- Yellow dog Democrat
