= 2026 United States local elections =

- 2026
- Mayoral elections

22 mayors in the top 100 most populous cities and Washington, D.C.
	Majority party	Minority party
Party	Democratic	Republican
Mayors before	68 + DC	22
Mayors up	11 + DC	7
Mayors elected	13 + DC	6
Seat change	▲2	▼1
	Third party	Fourth party
Party	Libertarian	Independent/NP
Mayors before	1	9
Mayors up	0	4
Mayors elected	0	1
Seat change	Steady	▼1
- Maps of 2026 mayoral elections in the top 100 most populous cities. Blue pins denote partisan or nonpartisan Democratic winners; red pins partisan or nonpartisan Republican; gray pins independent or undeclared. City names in bold and with asterisk (*) denotes a flip. City names in italics have not yet declared a winner, and the color of those pins denote the incumbent.

Local elections will be held in the United States throughout 2026 to elect officers of municipal and county governments. 22 mayorships in the country's top 100 most populous cities will be up for election, and many more will hold elections for local ballot measures, city council, and numerous other municipal offices. Many of these races coincided with the 2026 midterm elections.

== Municipal mayoral elections ==
=== Incumbents re-elected ===
- Arlington, Texas: Two-term incumbent Jim Ross was re-elected for a third term. Independent hold
- Auburn, Alabama: Two-term incumbent Ron Anders Jr. was re-elected for a third term. Independent hold
- Bismarck, North Dakota: One-term incumbent Mike Schmitz was re-elected for a second term. Independent hold
- Charleston, West Virginia: Two-term incumbent Amy Shuler Goodwin was re-elected for a third term. Democratic hold
- Cleveland, Tennessee: Two-term incumbent Kevin Brooks was re-elected for a third term. Republican hold
- Lexington, Kentucky: Two-term incumbent Linda Gorton was re-elected for a third term. Republican hold
- Long Beach, California: One-term incumbent Rex Richardson was re-elected for a second term. Democratic hold
- Louisville, Kentucky: One-term incumbent Craig Greenberg was re-elected for a second term. Independent hold
- Lubbock, Texas: One-term incumbent Republican Mark McBrayer was re-elected for a second term. Republican hold
- Minot, North Dakota: Incumbent Mark Jantzer was elected to a full term. Independent hold
- Murfreesboro, Tennessee: Three-term incumbent Shane McFarland was re-elected for a fourth term. Independent hold
- Newark, New Jersey: Three-term incumbent Ras Baraka was re-elected for a fourth term. Democratic hold
- Oklahoma City, Oklahoma: Two-term incumbent Republican David Holt was re-elected for a third term. Republican hold
- Paterson, New Jersey: Two-term incumbent Andre Sayegh was re-elected for a third term. Democratic hold
- Pensacola, Florida: One-term incumbent Republican D. C. Reeves was re-elected for a second term. Republican hold
- San Bernardino, California: One-term incumbent Democrat Helen Tran was re-elected for a second term. Democratic hold
- Union City, New Jersey: Seven-term incumbent Democrat Brian P. Stack was re-elected for an eighth term. Democratic hold

=== Incumbents defeated ===
- Ann Arbor, Michigan: Three-term incumbent Christopher Taylor lost renomination in the Democratic primary to Yousef Rabhi.
- Flint, Michigan: Two-term incumbent Sheldon Neeley was defeated for re-election by Tonya Burns.
- Los Angeles, California: One-term incumbent Karen Bass was defeated for re-election by fellow Democrat Nithya Raman.
- Pierre, South Dakota: Three-term incumbent Steve Harding was defeated for re-election by Todd Johnson.
- Providence, Rhode Island: One-term incumbent Brett Smiley lost renomination in the Democratic primary to David Morales who won the general election. Democratic hold
- Richmond, California: One-term incumbent Democrat Eduardo Martinez lost renomination to fellow Democrats Ahmad Anderson and Claudia Jimenez.
- River Falls, Wisconsin: One-term incumbent Republican Dan Toland was defeated for re-election by Democrat Alison Page. Democratic gain
- Salem, Oregon: One-term incumbent Independent Julie Hoy was defeated for re-election by Democrat Vanessa Nordyke. Democratic gain

==== Open seats won ====
- Boca Raton, Florida: Three-term incumbent Republican Scott Singer was ineligible for re-election due to term limits. Democrat Andy Thomson defeated Republicans Fran Nachlas and Mike Liebelson. Democratic gain
- Cataño, Puerto Rico (special): Incumbent Julio Alicea Vassallo died of cancer. New Progressive Hiram Torres Montalvo defeated fellow New Progressive Bethzaida Rodríguez Torres. New Progressive hold
- Chandler, Arizona: Two-term incumbent Kevin Hartke was term-limited and ineligible to run. Democrat Matt Orlando defeated Republican Jeff Weninger. Democratic gain
- Fargo, North Dakota: Two-term incumbent Tim Mahoney was term-limited and ineligible to run. Democrat Josh Boschee was elected. Democratic hold
- Independence, Missouri: One-term incumbent Rory Rowland decided not to run for re-election. Kevin King defeated Bridget McCandless.
- Irving, Texas: Three-term incumbent Rick Stopfer was term-limited and ineligible to run. Republican Albert C. Zapanta defeated Zhanae Jackson and Olivia Novelo Abreu. Republican hold
- Leander, Texas: Incumbent Republican Christine DeLisle resigned 1 year and 5 months into her second term. Democrat Na'Cole Thompson defeated Mike Sanders and Kathryn Pantalion-Parker. Democratic gain
- Montpelier, Vermont: Two-term incumbent Democrat John McCullough retired. Marc Gwinn won unopposed.
- Pearland, Texas: One-term incumbent Republican Kevin Cole decided not to run for re-election. Democrat Quentin Wiltz defeated Republican Tony Carbone. Democratic gain
- Sioux Falls, South Dakota: Two-term incumbent Paul TenHaken was term-limited and ineligible to run. Republican Christine Erickson defeated Democrat Jamie Smith. Republican hold
- Waukesha, Wisconsin: Three-term incumbent Independent Shawn Reilly decided not to run for re-election. Democrat Alicia Halvensleben defeated Republican Scott Allen. Democratic gain

==== Incumbents running for re-election ====
- Alexandria, Louisiana: One-term incumbent Jacques Roy is running for re-election.
- Anaheim, California: One-term incumbent Ashleigh Aitken is running for re-election.
- Asheville, North Carolina: Three-term incumbent Esther Manheimer is running for re-election.
- Boulder City, Nevada: One-term incumbent Joe Hardy is running for re-election.
- California City, California: One-term incumbent Marquette Hawkins is running for re-election.
- Chula Vista, California: Two-term incumbent John McCann is running for re-election.
- Compton, California: One-term incumbent Emma Sharif is running for re-election.
- Corpus Christi, Texas: Three-term incumbent Paulette Guajardo is running for re-election.
- Earle, Arkansas: One-term incumbent Jaylen Smith is running for re-election.
- East Providence, Rhode Island: Two-term incumbent Roberto DaSilva is running for re-election.
- Henderson, Nevada: One-term incumbent Michelle Romero is running for re-election.
- Inglewood, California: Four-term incumbent James T. Butts Jr. is running for re-election.
- Irvine, California: Sixth non-consecutive term incumbent Larry Agran is running for re-election.
- Johnston, Rhode Island: One-term incumbent Joseph Polisena Jr. is running for re-election.
- Laredo, Texas: One-term incumbent Victor Treviño is running for re-election.
- League City, Texas: One-term incumbent Nicholas Richard Long is running for re-election.
- Lewiston, Maine: One-term incumbent Carl Sheline is running for re-election.
- Little Rock, Arkansas: Two-term incumbent Frank Scott Jr. is running for re-election.
- Los Angeles, California: One-term incumbent Karen Bass is running for re-election.
- Mankato, Minnesota: Two-term incumbent Najwa Massad is running for re-election.
- Monterey, California: One-term incumbent Tyller Williamson is running for re-election.
- Newport News, Virginia: One-term incumbent Phillip Jones is running for re-election.
- Oakland, California: Incumbent Barbara Lee is running for election to a full term.
- Raleigh, North Carolina: One-term incumbent Janet Cowell is running for re-election.
- Santa Ana, California: Two-term incumbent Valerie Amezcua is running for re-election.
- Shreveport, Louisiana: One-term incumbent Tom Arceneaux is running for re-election.
- Shrewsbury, New Jersey: One-term incumbent Kimberly Eulner is running for re-election to a full term.
- South Miami, Florida: Two-term incumbent Javier Fernandez is running for re-election.
- St. Petersburg, Florida: One-term incumbent Ken Welch is running for re-election.
- Trenton, New Jersey: Two-term incumbent Reed Gusciora is running for re-election.
- Winslow, Arizona: Three-term incumbent Birdie Wilcox-Cano is running for re-election.

=== Ineligible or retiring incumbents ===
- Clarksville, Tennessee: Two-term incumbent Joe Pitts is retiring.
- Flemington, New Jersey: One-term incumbent Marcia A. Karrow is retiring.
- Fort Smith, Arkansas: Two-term incumbent George B. McGill is retiring.
- North Las Vegas, Nevada: One-term incumbent Pamela Goynes-Brown is term-limited and ineligible to run.
- Peoria, Arizona: One-term incumbent Jason Beck is retiring.
- Reno, Nevada: Three-term incumbent Hillary Schieve is term-limited and ineligible to run.
- Rochester, Minnesota: Two-term incumbent Kim Norton is retiring.
- Santa Clara, California: Two-term incumbent Lisa Gillmor is term-limited and ineligible to run.
- Tallahassee, Florida: Two-term incumbent John E. Dailey is retiring.
- Tinian, Northern Mariana Islands: Two-term incumbent Edwin P. Aldan is term-limited and ineligible to run.
- Washington, D.C.: Three-term incumbent Muriel Bowser is retiring.
- Wyoming, Michigan: One-term incumbent Kent Vanderwood is retiring.

== County elections ==
=== Open seats won ===
- Anne Arundel County, Maryland: Incumbent Democrat Steuart Pittman was term-limited and ineligible to run. Democrat Allison Pickard was elected. Democratic hold.
- Baltimore County, Maryland: Incumbent Democrat Kathy Klausmeier retired. Democrat Julian Jones was elected. Democratic hold.
- Howard County, Maryland: Incumbent Democrat Calvin Ball III was term-limited and ineligible to run. Democrat Vanessa Atterbeary was elected. Democratic hold.
- Knox County, Tennessee: Two-term incumbent Glenn Jacobs was term-limited and ineligible to run. Republican Chairwoman of the Knox County Board of Education Betsy Henderson defeated labor union leader and president of the Knoxville-Oak Ridge Central Labor Council Beau Hawk 52.47% to 47.53%. Republican hold.
- Montgomery County, Maryland: Incumbent Democrat Marc Elrich was term-limited and ineligible to run. Democrat Will Jawando won election. Democratic hold.

==== Incumbents defeated ====
- Fort Bend County, Texas: Two-term incumbent KP George was defeated for renomination.
- Wicomico County, Maryland: Incumbent Republican Julie Giordano lost re-election to former county councilmember Ernest Davis. Democratic gain.

=== Incumbents re-elected ===
- Frederick County, Maryland: Incumbent Democrat Jessica Fitzwater was re-elected to a second term.
- Harford County, Maryland: Incumbent Republican Bob Cassilly was re-elected to a second term.
- Macomb County, Michigan: Four-term incumbent Mark Hackel was re-elected to a fifth term.
- Prince George's County, Maryland: Incumbent Democrat Aisha Braveboy was elected to a four-year term.
- Wayne County, Michigan: Three-term incumbent Warren Evans was re-elected to a fourth term.

=== Eligible incumbents ===
- Cuyahoga County, Ohio: One-term incumbent Chris Ronayne is eligible for re-election.
- Dallas County, Texas: Four-term incumbent Clay Jenkins is running for re-election.
- Hamilton County, Tennessee: One-term incumbent Weston Wamp is eligible for re-election.
- Jackson County, Missouri: Incumbent Phil LeVota is eligible for election to a full term.
- Maui County, Hawaii: One-term incumbent Richard Bissen is eligible for re-election.
- Montgomery County, Tennessee: One-term incumbent Wes Golden is eligible for re-election.
- Montgomery County, Texas: Two-term incumbent Mark Keough is eligible for re-election.
- Rutherford County, Tennessee: One-term incumbent Joe Carr is eligible for re-election.
- Tarrant County, Texas: One-term incumbent Tim O'Hare is eligible for re-election.

=== Ineligible or retiring incumbents ===
- Harris County, Texas: Two-term incumbent Lina Hidalgo is retiring.
- Hennepin County, Minnesota: One-term incumbent Mary Moriarty is retiring.
- Kauai, Hawaii: Two-term incumbent Derek Kawakami is term-limited and ineligible to run.
- Orange County, Florida: Two-term incumbent Jerry Demings is term-limited and ineligible to run.
- St. Louis County, Missouri: One-term incumbent Sam Page is retiring.
- Shelby County, Tennessee: Two-term incumbent Lee Harris is term-limited and ineligible to run.
- Williamson County, Tennessee: Six-term incumbent Rogers C. Anderson is retiring.

== Mayoral elections in the 100 most populous cities ==
City	Date	Incumbent			Status	Candidates
City	Date	Party	Mayor	Elected	Status	Candidates
Anaheim, CA	Nov 3, 2026	Dem (Note: Election officially nonpartisan.)	Ashleigh Aitken	2022	Incumbent re-elected.	▌ ✓ Ashleigh Aitken (Democratic) 56.0%; ▌Alfredo Rodriguez (Independent) 32.4%; ▌Imran Sharief (Independent) 11.6%
Arlington, TX	May 2, 2026	Ind	Jim Ross	2023; 2021	Incumbent re-elected.	▌ ✓ Jim Ross (Independent) 50.1%; ▌Steve Cavender (Independent) 39.4%; ▌Hunter Crow (Independent) 5.5%; ▌Shaun Mallory (Independent) 4.9%; ▌C. Phillip Dobson (Independent) 0.1%
Chandler, AZ	Jul 21, 2026	Rep	Kevin Hartke	2022; 2018	Incumbent term-limited. Democratic gain.	▌ ✓ Matt Orlando (Democratic) 58.5%; ▌Jeff Weninger (Republican) 41.5%
Chula Vista, CA	Jun 2, 2026 (P); Nov 3, 2026 (G)	Rep	John McCann	2022	Incumbent re-elected.	▌ ✓ John McCann (Republican) 56.3%; ▌Francisco Tamayo (Democratic) 43.7%
Corpus Christi, TX	Nov 3, 2026 (G); Dec 12, 2026 (R)	Ind	Paulette Guajardo	2024; 2022; 2020	Incumbent running for re-election.	▌Paulette Guajardo (Independent); ▌Gil Hernandez (Republican)
Henderson, NV	Jun 9, 2026 (P); Nov 3, 2026 (G)	Rep	Michelle Romero	2022	Incumbent re-elected.	▌ ✓ Michelle Romero (Republican) 60.6%; ▌Hollie Chadwick (Independent) 39.4%
Irvine, CA	Nov 3, 2026	Dem	Larry Agran	2024; 2002; 2000; 1988 (Note: Previously not directly elected.)	Incumbent re-elected.	▌ ✓ Larry Agran (Democratic) 69.9%; ▌Maksim V. Egorov (Independent) 30.1%
Irving, TX	May 2, 2026	Rep	Rick Stopfer	2023; 2020; 2017	Incumbent term-limited. Republican hold.	▌ ✓ Albert C. Zapanta (Republican) 67.2%; ▌Zhanae Jackson (Democratic) 18.6%; ▌Olivia Novelo Abreu (Independent) 14.3%
Laredo, TX	Nov 3, 2026 (G); Dec 12, 2026 (R)	Ind	Victor Treviño	2022	Incumbent running for re-election.	▌Victor Treviño (Independent); ▌Alyssa Cigarroa (Democratic)
Lexington, KY	May 19, 2026 (P); Nov 3, 2026 (G)	Rep	Linda Gorton	2022; 2018	Incumbent re-elected.	▌ ✓ Linda Gorton (Republican) 55.1%; ▌Raquel Carter (Democratic) 44.9%
Long Beach, CA	Jun 2, 2026	Dem	Rex Richardson	2022	Incumbent re-elected.	▌ ✓ Rex Richardson (Democratic) 57.4%; ▌Joshua Rodriguez (Republican) 17.5%; ▌Chris Sweeney (Independent) 9.7%; ▌Lee Goldin (Independent) 7.0%; ▌Terri Rivers (Independent) 5.4%; ▌Oscar Cancio (Independent) 2.9%
Los Angeles, CA	Jun 2, 2026 (P); Nov 3, 2026 (G)	Dem	Karen Bass	2022	Incumbent lost re-election. Democratic hold.	▌ ✓ Nithya Raman (Democratic) 54.9%; ▌Karen Bass (Democratic) 45.1%
Louisville, KY	May 19, 2026 (P); Nov 3, 2026 (G)	Dem	Craig Greenberg	2022	Incumbent re-elected.	▌ ✓ Craig Greenberg (Democratic) 57.6%; ▌Shameka L. Parrish-Wright (Democratic) 42.4%
Lubbock, TX	May 2, 2026	Rep	Mark McBrayer	2024	Incumbent re-elected.	▌ ✓ Mark McBrayer (Republican) 70.3%; ▌Stephen Sanders (Independent) 19.2%; ▌Peggy Bohmfalk (Independent) 7.8%; ▌G. Todd Winans (Independent) 2.7%
Newark, NJ	May 12, 2026	Dem	Ras Baraka	2022; 2018; 2014	Incumbent re-elected.	▌ ✓ Ras Baraka (Democratic) 70.1%; ▌Jhamar Youngblood (Democratic) 16.8%; ▌Debra Salters (Democratic) 4.7%; ▌Sheila Montague (Democratic) 3.4%; ▌Tanisha Garner (Independent) 1.7%; ▌Noble Milton (Republican) 1.5%; ▌Douglas R. Davis (Independent) 1.3%; ▌Nasheedah S. Singleton (Independent) 0.5%
North Las Vegas, NV	Jun 9, 2026 (P); Nov 3, 2026 (G)	Dem	Pamela Goynes-Brown	2022	Incumbent term-limited. Democratic hold.	▌ ✓ Daniele Monroe-Moreno (Democratic) 58.5%; ▌Scott Black (Democratic) 41.5%
Oakland, CA	Nov 3, 2026	Dem	Barbara Lee	2025 (sp)	Incumbent re-elected.	▌ ✓ Barbara Lee (Democratic) 85.2%; ▌Julius Robinson (Independent) 6.1%; ▌Mindy Pechenuk (Independent) 4.6%; ▌Brenda Grisham (Independent) 4.1%
Oklahoma City, OK	Feb 10, 2026	Rep	David Holt	2022; 2018	Incumbent re-elected.	▌ ✓ David Holt (Republican) 86.5%; ▌Matthew Pallares (Independent) 13.5%
Raleigh, NC	Nov 3, 2026	Dem	Janet Cowell	2024	Incumbent re-elected.	▌ ✓ Janet Cowell (Democratic) 81.6%; ▌Ashleigh Heath Armstrong (Independent) 17.2%; ▌ Write-ins 1.2%
Reno, NV	Jun 9, 2026 (P); Nov 3, 2026 (G)	Ind	Hillary Schieve	2022; 2018; 2014	Incumbent term-limited. Democratic gain.	▌ ✓ Kate Marshall (Democratic) 61.1%; ▌Kathleen Taylor (Republican) 38.9%
Santa Ana, CA	Nov 3, 2026	Dem	Valerie Amezcua	2024; 2022	Incumbent lost re-election. Democratic hold.	▌ ✓ Dan Shimell (Democratic) 47.1%; ▌Valerie Amezcua (Democratic) 39.7%; ▌Dwayne Shipp (Independent) 13.2%
St. Petersburg, FL	Aug 18, 2026 (P); Nov 3, 2026 (G)	Dem	Ken Welch	2021	Incumbent lost re-election. Democratic hold.	▌ ✓ Charlie Crist (Democratic) 62.0%; ▌Ken Welch (Democratic) 38.0%

=== Federal district ===
City	Date	Incumbent			Status	Candidates
City	Date	Party	Mayor	Elected	Status	Candidates
Washington, D.C.	Jun 16, 2026 (P); Nov 3, 2026 (G)	Dem	Muriel Bowser	2022; 2018; 2014	Incumbent retired. Democratic hold.	▌ ✓ Janeese Lewis George (Democratic) 84.4%; ▌Rhonda Hamilton (Independent) 10.0%; ▌Robert L. Gross (Green) 3.5%; ▌ Write-ins 2.1%

== Executive elections in the 100 most populous counties ==
Consolidated city-counties such as Louisville, Kentucky (co-extensive with Jefferson County) are listed elsewhere on the page.

County (metro)	Date	Incumbent			Status	Candidates
County (metro)	Date	Party	Mayor	Elected	Status	Candidates
Cook, IL (Chicago)	Mar 17, 2026 (P); Nov 3, 2026 (G)	Dem	Toni Preckwinkle	2022; 2018; 2014; 2010	Incumbent is running for re-election.	▌Toni Preckwinkle (Democratic); ▌Michael Murphy (Libertarian)
Harris, TX (Houston)	Mar 3, 2026 (P); Nov 3, 2026 (G)	Dem	Lina Hidalgo	2022; 2018	Incumbent retiring.	▌Letitia Plummer (Democratic); ▌Orlando Sanchez (Republican)
Dallas, TX (Dallas)	Mar 3, 2026 (P); Nov 3, 2026 (G)	Dem	Clay Jenkins	2022; 2018; 2014; 2010	Incumbent is running for re-election.	▌Clay Jenkins (Democratic); ▌Mike Immler (Republican)
Tarrant, TX (Fort Worth)	Mar 3, 2026 (P); Nov 3, 2026 (G)	Rep	Tim O'Hare	2022	Incumbent is running for re-election.	▌Tim O'Hare (Republican); ▌Alisa Simmons (Democratic)
Bexar, TX (San Antonio)	Mar 3, 2026 (P); Nov 3, 2026 (G)	Dem	Peter Sakai	2022	Incumbent lost renomination.	▌Ron Nirenberg (Democratic); ▌Patrick Von Dohlen (Republican)
Wayne, MI (Detroit)	Aug 4, 2026 (P); Nov 3, 2026 (G)	Dem	Warren Evans	2022; 2018; 2014	Incumbent re-elected. Democratic hold.	▌ ✓ Warren Evans (Democratic); ▌Michael Evans (Republican)
Orange, FL (Orlando)		Dem	Jerry Demings	2022; 2018	Incumbent term-limited.	▌Chris Messina (Republican); ▌Stephanie Murphy (Democratic); ▌Tiffany Moore Russell (Democratic); ▌Mayra Uribe (Democratic)
Travis, TX (Austin)	Mar 3, 2026 (P); Nov 3, 2026 (G)	Dem	Andy Brown	2022	Incumbent is running for re-election unopposed.	▌Andy Brown (Democratic)
Collin, TX (Plano)	Mar 3, 2026 (P); Nov 3, 2026 (G)	Rep	Chris Hill	2022; 2018	Incumbent is running for re-election.	▌Chris Hill (Republican); ▌John R. Buster Brown (Democratic)
Cuyahoga, OH (Cleveland)	May 5, 2026 (P); Nov 3, 2026 (G)	Dem	Chris Ronayne	2022	Incumbent is running for re-election unopposed.	▌Chris Ronayne (Democratic)
Fulton, GA (Atlanta)		Dem	Robb Pitts	2022; 2018; 2017 (special)	Incumbent lost renomination	▌Mo Ivory (Democratic); ▌Eric J. Tatum (Republican)
Montgomery, MD (Washington)	Jun 23, 2026 (P); Nov 3, 2026 (G)	Dem	Marc Elrich	2022; 2018	Incumbent term-limited.	▌Will Jawando (Democratic); ▌Esther Wells (Republican)
Denton, TX (Denton, Texas)	Mar 3, 2026 (P); Nov 3, 2026 (G)	Rep	Andy Eads	2022	Incumbent is running for re-election.	▌Andy Eads (Republican); ▌Nick Pappas (Democratic)
St. Louis Co., MO (St. Louis)	Aug 4, 2026 (P); Nov 3, 2026 (G)	Dem	Sam Page	2022; 2020 (sp); 2019 (app)	Incumbent retiring.	
Bergen, NJ (New York)		Dem	Jim Tedesco	2022; 2018; 2014	Incumbent is running for re-election.	
Prince George's, MD (Washington)	Jun 23, 2026 (P); Nov 3, 2026 (G)	Dem	Aisha Braveboy	2025 (sp)	Incumbent is running for re-election.	▌Aisha Braveboy (Democratic); ▌Moisette Tonya Sweat (Independent)
Fort Bend, TX (Sugar Land)	Mar 3, 2026 (P); Nov 3, 2026 (G)	Rep (Note: Democrat KP George switched to the Republican Party on June 18, 2025.)	KP George	2022; 2018	Incumbent lost renomination.	▌Daniel Wong (Republican); ▌Dexter McCoy (Democratic)
Hidalgo, TX (McAllen)	Mar 3, 2026 (P); Nov 3, 2026 (G)	Dem	Richard Cortez	2022; 2018	Incumbent is running for re-election unopposed.	▌Richard Cortez (Democratic)
Shelby, TN (Memphis)	May 5, 2026 (P); Aug 6, 2026 (G)	Dem	Lee Harris	2022; 2018	Incumbent term-limited.	▌Mickell Lowery (Democratic); ▌John DeBerry (Republican)
Macomb, MI (Detroit)	Aug 4, 2026 (P); Nov 3, 2026 (G)	Dem	Mark Hackel	2022; 2018; 2014; 2010	Incumbent re-elected. Democratic hold.	▌ ✓ Mark Hackel (Democratic)
Essex, NJ (New York)		Dem	Joseph N. DiVincenzo Jr.	2022; 2018; 2014; 2010; 2006; 2002	Incumbent is running for re-election	▌Joseph N. DiVincenzo Jr. (Democratic); ▌Maritza Mathews (Republican)
El Paso, TX (El Paso, Texas)	Mar 3, 2026 (P); Nov 3, 2026 (G)	Dem	Ricardo Samaniego	2022; 2018	Incumbent is running for re-election	▌Minerva Torres Shelton (Republican); ▌Ricardo Samaniego (Democratic)
Baltimore, MD (Baltimore)	Jun 23, 2026 (P); Nov 3, 2026 (G)	Dem	Kathy Klausmeier	2025 (app)	Incumbent retiring.	▌Julian Jones (Democratic); ▌Patrick Dyer (Republican)
Multnomah, OR (Portland, Oregon)		Dem	Jessica Vega Pederson	2022	Incumbent is retiring.	▌Shannon Singleton (Democratic); ▌Julia Brim-Edwards (Democratic)
Montgomery, TX (The Woodlands)	Mar 3, 2026 (P); Nov 3, 2026 (G)	Rep	Mark Keough	2022; 2018	Incumbent is running for re-election.	▌Mark Keough (Republican); ▌James Graf (Democratic)
Williamson, TX (Round Rock, TX)	Mar 3, 2026 (P); Nov 3, 2026 (G)	Rep	Steven Snell	2025 (app)	Incumbent is running for re-election.	▌Steven Snell (Republican); ▌Heather Jefts (Democratic)
Jackson, MO (Kansas City)	Aug 4, 2026 (P); Nov 3, 2026 (G)	Dem	Phil LeVota	2025 (app)	Incumbent is retiring.	▌Alan Rohlfing (Republican); ▌Stacy Lake (Democratic)

== List of local elections by state ==
- Alabama (page)
  - County – Aug 25 (P), Nov 3 (G)
    - Baldwin County
    - Jefferson County
    - Jefferson County (Commission)
    - Jefferson County (Sheriff)
    - Lee County
    - Madison County
    - Mobile County
    - Shelby County
  - Auburn – Aug 25
- Arizona
  - Chandler (mayor) – Jul 21
- Arkansas – Mar 3 (P), Nov 3 (G)
  - 2026 Arkansas county judge elections
- California – Jun 2 (P), Nov 3 (G)
  - Anaheim (mayor)
  - Long Beach (mayor) – Jun 2
  - Los Angeles County
    - Board of Supervisors
  - Los Angeles
    - Mayor
    - City Attorney
  - San Diego (City Council)
  - San Jose (City Council)
  - 2026 Santa Clara County Board of Supervisors election
  - 2026 San Francisco Board of Supervisors election
- District of Columbia (page) – Jun 16 (P), Nov 3 (G)
  - Mayor, Attorney general, Council
- Florida – Aug 18 (P), Nov 3 (G)
  - Boca Raton (mayor)
  - Orange County (Mayor)
  - Pensacola (mayor)
  - St. Petersburg (Mayor)
  - Tallahassee (mayor)
- Georgia (U.S. state) –
  - 2026 Cobb County elections
  - 2026 DeKalb County, Georgia, elections
  - 2026 Fulton County elections
  - 2026 Gwinnett County elections
- Illinois –
  - Cook County
    - Cook County Board of Commissioners
- Kentucky
  - Lexington (mayor)
  - Louisville (mayor)
- Louisiana
  - Shreveport (mayor)
- Maryland
  - County executives – Nov 3
- Michigan
  - Flint (Mayor) – Aug 4 (P), Nov 3 (G)
  - 2026 Macomb County Executive election
- Minnesota
  - Hennepin County (Attorney) – Nov 3
- Missouri – Aug 4 (P), Nov 3 (G)
  - St. Louis County (Executive)
  - St. Charles County (Executive)
- Nebraska
  - Douglas County – Nov 3
  - Lancaster County
- Nevada
  - Reno (mayor)
- New Jersey
  - Newark (mayor) – May 12
- North Carolina
  - 2026 Wake County elections
    - District attorney – Mar 3 (P), Nov 3 (G)
- North Dakota – Jun 9
- Northern Mariana Islands – Nov 3
- Oklahoma
  - Oklahoma City (mayor) – Feb 10
- Oregon
  - Portland (City Council) May 19 (P), Nov 3 (G)
- Rhode Island
  - Providence (mayor) Sept 9 (P), Nov 3 (G)
- South Dakota
  - Sioux Falls (mayor) – Jun 2
- Tennessee
  - County – May 5 (P), Aug 6 (G)
    - County mayors
    - Knox County
    - Shelby County
- Texas – Mar 3 (P), Nov 3 (G)
  - Arlington (mayor)
  - Bexar County
    - District attorney, Judge
  - Collin County (Judge)
  - Dallas County
  - Fort Bend County (Judge)
  - Harris County
    - Harris County (Board of Commissioners)
    - Harris County (Judge)
  - Irving (mayor) – May 2
  - Lubbock (mayor) – May 2
  - Tarrant County)
    - County Judge
- Utah
  - 2026 Salt Lake County elections
- Washington
  - 2026 King County elections
  - 2026 King County Council election
  - 2026 Spokane County elections
- Wisconsin
  - Waukesha County (mayor) – Dec 15
    - Waukesha (mayor) – Apr 7
- Wyoming (page) – Aug 4 (P), Nov 3 (G)
  - Gillette (Mayor)
