= 2026 Utah elections =

- June 23, 2026 (primary); November 3, 2026 (general)

The 2026 Utah elections were held on November 3, 2026. The primaries were held on June 23, 2026.

== United States Congress ==
- 2026 United States House of Representatives elections in Utah

== State executive officials ==
- 2026 Utah State Board of Education election

== State Legislature ==
- 2026 Utah House of Representatives election
- 2026 Utah Senate election

== Judicial elections ==
- 2026 Utah Supreme Court elections
- 2026 Utah intermediate appellate court elections

== Ballot measures ==
- 2026 Utah House Bill 267 veto referendum

== Local elections ==
- 2026 Salt Lake County elections
