= 2018 Macomb County Executive election =

- November 6, 2018
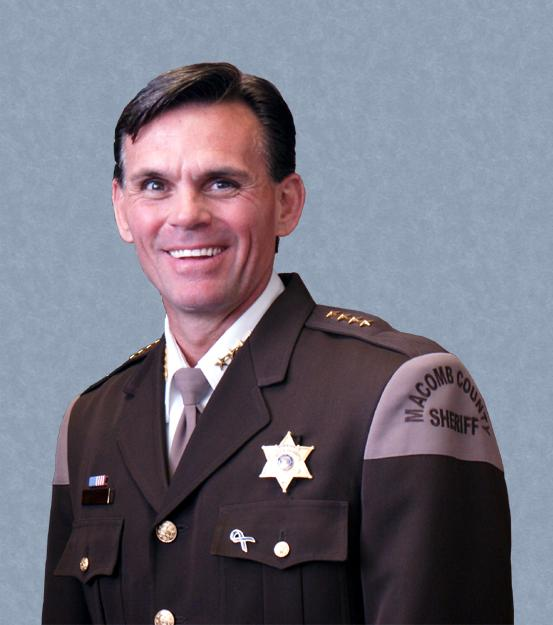

Nominee	Mark Hackel	Joseph M. Hunt
Party	Democratic	Republican
Popular vote	231,389	113,121
Percentage	67.16%	32.84%
County Executive before election
Mark Hackel
Democratic
Elected County Executive
Mark Hackel
Democratic

The 2018 Macomb County Executive election was held on November 6, 2018. Incumbent County Executive Mark Hackel ran for re-election. In the general election, he was challenged by corporate trainer Joseph Hunt, the Republican nominee. Hackel defeated Hunt in a landslide, winning 67 percent of the vote.

== Democratic primary ==
=== Candidates ===
- Mark Hackel, incumbent County Executive
- Arnold Simkus, businessman

=== Primary results ===
Democratic primary results
Party	Candidate	Votes	%
Democratic	Mark Hackel (inc.)	71,206	83.14%
Democratic	Arnold Simkus	14,444	16.86%
Total votes		85,650	100.00%

== Republican primary ==
=== Candidates ===
- Joseph M. Hunt, corporate trainer, 2016 County Commission candidate
- Norbert Golembiewski, computer systems engineer

=== Primary results ===
Republican primary results
Party	Candidate	Votes	%
Republican	Joseph M. Hunt	36,508	55.78%
Republican	Norbert Golembiewski	28,937	44.22%
Total votes		65,445	100.00%

== General election ==
=== Results ===
2018 Macomb County Executive election
Party	Candidate	Votes	%
Democratic	Mark Hackel (inc.)	231,389	67.16%
Republican	Joseph M. Hunt	113,121	32.84%
Total votes		344,510	100.00%
Democratic hold			
