= 2026 Henderson, Nevada mayoral election =

2026 Henderson mayoral election
- November 3, 2026 (runoff)
| Candidate | Michelle Romero | Hollie Chadwick |
| Popular vote | 69,703 | 45,244 |
| Percentage | 60.64% | 39.36% |
Mayor before election
Michelle Romero
Elected mayor
Michelle Romero

The 2026 Henderson mayoral election was held on November 3, 2026, to elect the mayor of Henderson, Nevada. A nonpartisan top-two primary was held on June 9, 2026. Incumbent mayor Michelle Romero won re-election for the second term.

== Candidates ==
=== Declared ===
- Hollie Chadwick, former Henderson police chief (2023–2025)
- Adam Price, chair of the Henderson Democrats
- Andrew Ramirez
- Michelle Romero, incumbent mayor (2019–present)
- Angeles Scorsetti, interior designer

== Primary election ==
=== Endorsements ===
Michelle Romero

Statewide officials

- Joe Lombardo, Nevada governor (2019–present)

Labor unions

- International Association of Fire Fighters Local 1883

Organizations

- Henderson Chamber of Commerce PAC
- Southern Nevada Home Builders Association

=== Results ===
2026 Henderson mayoral primary election
| Candidate | Votes | % |
|---|---|---|
| Michelle Romero (incumbent) | 29,040 | 49.75 |
| Hollie Chadwick | 13,432 | 23.01 |
| Adam Price | 12,504 | 21.42 |
| Andrew Ramirez | 1,847 | 3.16 |
| Angeles Scorsetti | 1,549 | 2.65 |
| Total votes | 58,372 | 100.0 |

== General election ==
=== Results ===
2026 Henderson mayoral election
| Candidate | Votes | % |
|---|---|---|
| Michelle Romero (incumbent) | 69,703 | 60.64 |
| Hollie Chadwick | 45,244 | 39.36 |
| Total votes | 114,947 | 100.0 |

== See also ==
- 2026 Nevada elections
