= 2026 Boca Raton mayoral election =

2026 mayoral election

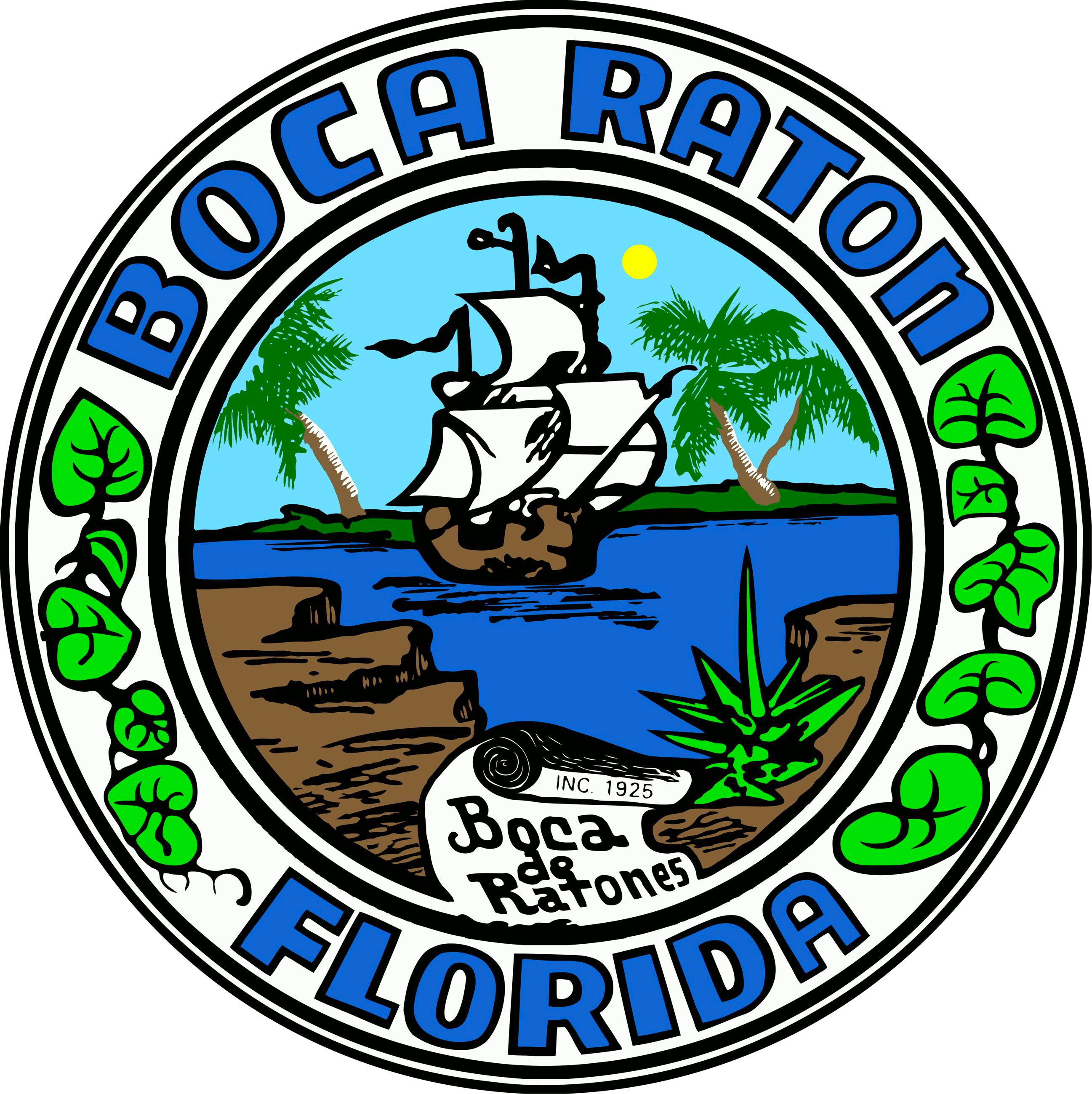
- March 10, 2026
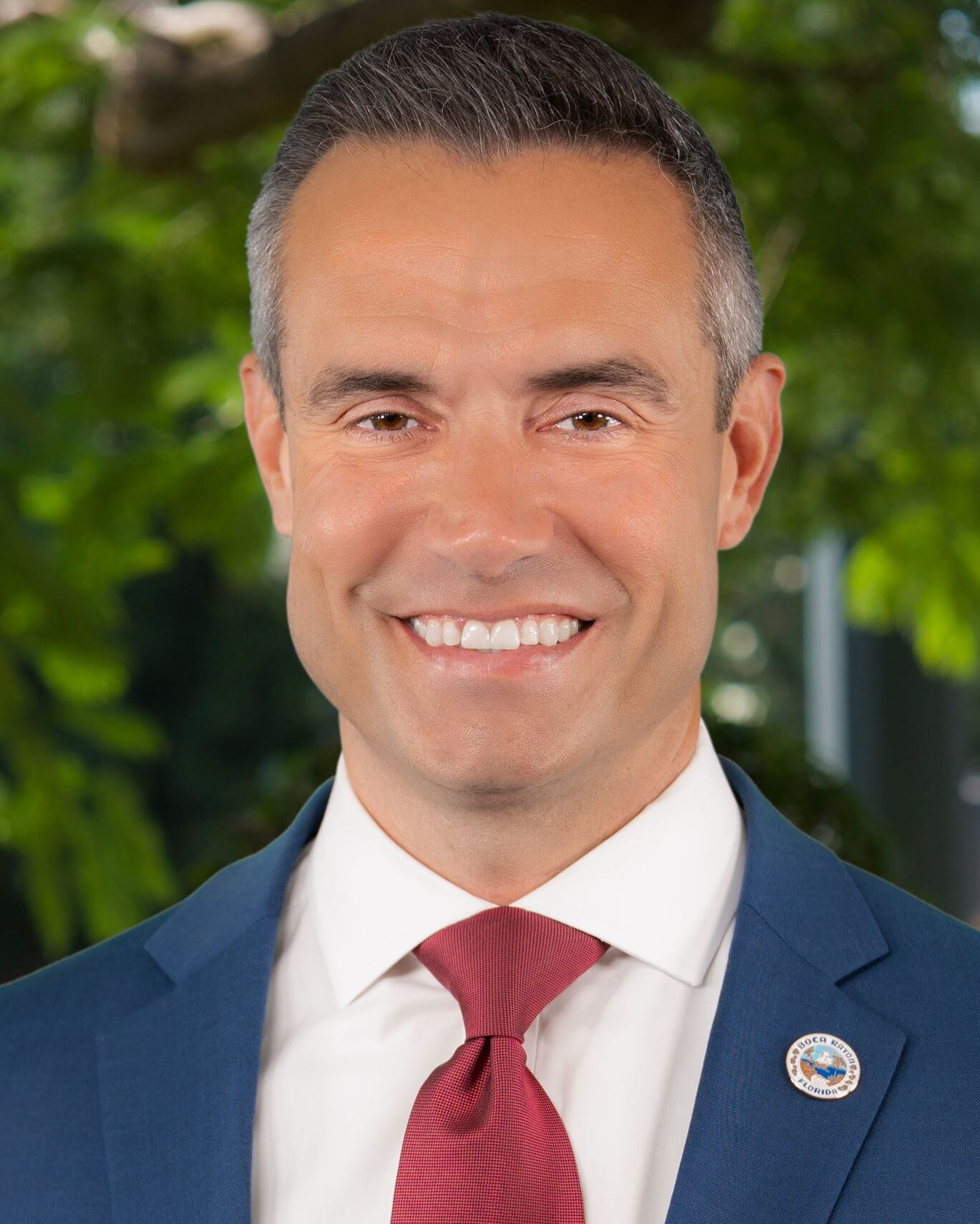

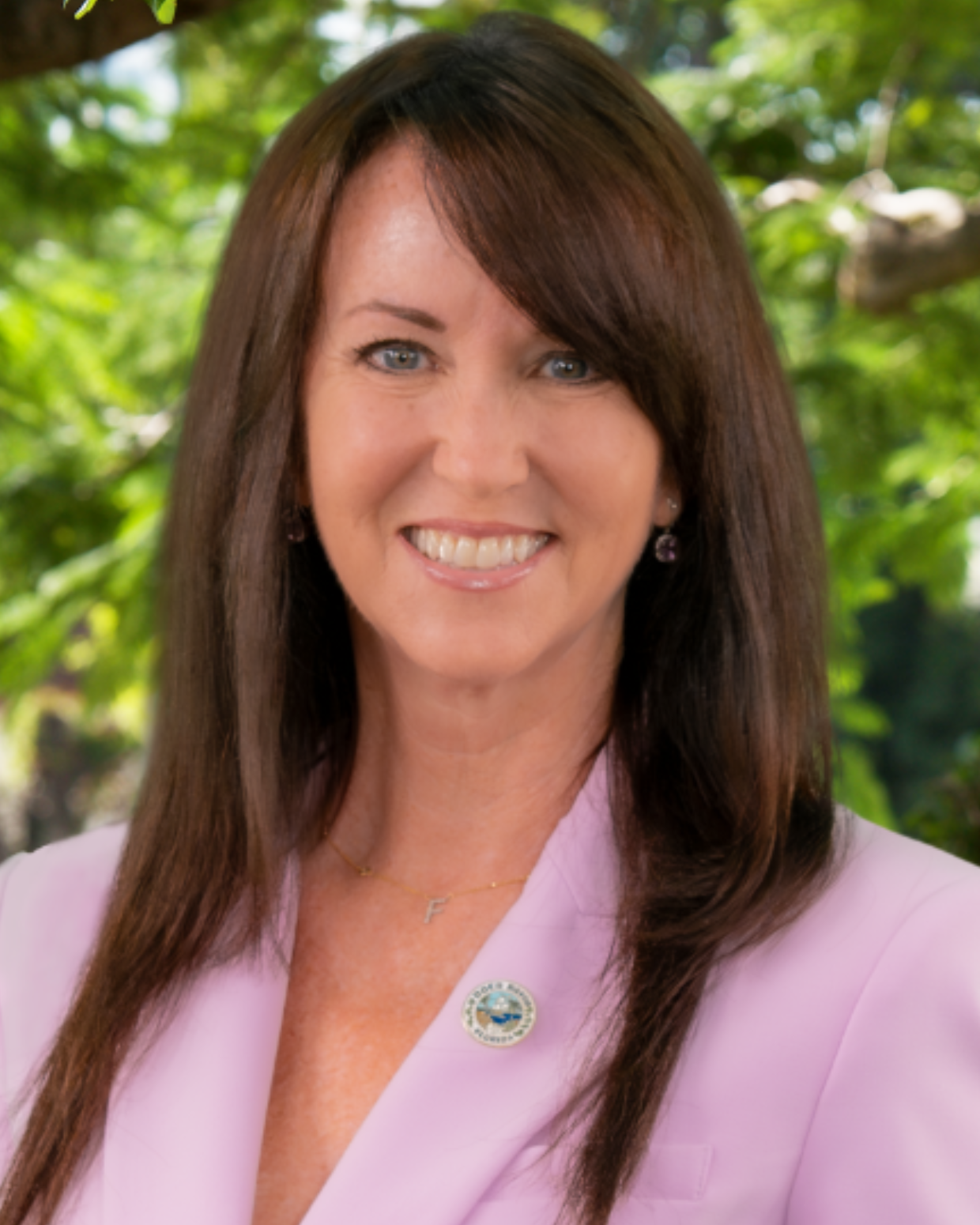
| Candidate | Andy Thomson | Mike Liebelson | Fran Nachlas |
| Party | Democratic | Republican | Republican |
| Popular vote | 7,572 | 7,567 | 3,967 |
| Percentage | 39.63% | 39.61% | 20.76% |
Mayor before election
Scott Singer
Elected mayor
Andy Thomson

The 2026 Boca Raton mayoral election was held on March 10, 2026, to elect the next mayor of Boca Raton, Florida. Incumbent mayor Scott Singer was term-limited and ineligible to seek re-election.

== Background ==
Scott Singer had served as mayor since 2018, following previous service on the Boca Raton City Council. Under the city’s term-limit rules, he could not seek another term. His departure resulted in a competitive open-seat election.

== Candidates ==
=== Declared ===
- Mike Liebelson, community activist
- Fran Nachlas, deputy mayor of Boca Raton
- Andy Thomson, Boca Raton City Council member

== General election ==
Initially, it appeared that Thomson had won by five votes, necessitating a recount. The recount, which was completed on March 13, confirmed that Thomson had won by those five votes. This was the first time in over 30 years a Democrat was elected mayor. Given that Boca Raton was a Republican stronghold, many analyzed this result, combined with many other special election results in 2025 and earlier in 2026, could lead to a blue wave.

General election results
| Party | Candidate | Votes | % |
|---|---|---|---|
| Democratic | Andy Thomson | 7,572 | 39.63% |
| Republican | Mike Liebelson | 7,567 | 39.61% |
| Republican | Fran Nachlas | 3,967 | 20.76% |
| Total votes | | 19,106 | 100.00% |

== See also ==
- 2026 Florida elections
