= 2026 Corpus Christi mayoral election =

- November 3, 2026; December 12, 2026 (runoff)
Candidate	Paulette Guajardo	Gil Hernandez
Party	Nonpartisan	Nonpartisan
Mayor before election
Paulette Guajardo
Independent
Elected mayor
TBD

The 2026 Corpus Christi mayoral election was held on November 3, 2026, with a runoff election that will be held on December 12, 2026 to elect the mayor of Corpus Christi, Texas.

Incumbent three-term mayor Paulette Guajardo is running for the re-election.

== Candidates ==
=== Declared ===
- Paulette Guajardo, incumbent mayor
- David Ainsworth Sr., businessman
- John Calkusic, businessman
- Dave Heasley, self-employed
- Gil Hernandez, City Councilmember (2018–present)
- Chelise Hyatt, nonprofit development executive
- Kaylynn Paxson, City Councilmember (2024–present)

=== Withdrawn ===
- Anna Hernandez, self-employed
- Davian N. Gomez, freelancer

== Results ==
2026 Corpus Christi mayoral election
Candidate	Votes	%
Paulette Guajardo (incumbent)	31,017	38.76
Gil Hernandez	18,744	23.43
Kaylynn Paxson	12,602	15.75
David Ainsworth Sr.	10,768	13.46
Dave Heasley	3,030	3.79
Chelise Hyatt	2,584	3.23
John Calkusic	1,269	1.59
Total votes	80,014	100.00

2026 Corpus Christi mayoral election runoff
Candidate	Votes	%
Paulette Guajardo (incumbent)		
Gil Hernandez		
Total votes		100.00

== See also ==
- 2026 Texas elections
