= 2026 Laredo mayoral election =

- November 3, 2026; December 12, 2026 (runoff)
Candidate	Victor Treviño	Alyssa Cigarroa
Party	Nonpartisan	Nonpartisan
Mayor before election
Victor Treviño
Independent
Elected mayor
TBD

The 2026 Laredo mayoral election was held on November 3, 2026, with a runoff election that will be held on December 12, 2026 to elect the mayor of Laredo, Texas.

Incumbent one-term mayor Victor Treviño is running for the re-election.

== Candidates ==
=== Declared ===
- Victor Treviño, incumbent mayor
- Alfonso Casso, retired administrator
- Alyssa Cigarroa, City Councilmember (2020–present)
- Jorge Garza, truck driver
- Jose David Gonzalez, custom broker

== Results ==
2026 Laredo mayoral election
Candidate	Votes	%
Alyssa Cigarroa	19,510	35.54
Victor Treviño (incumbent)	17,725	32.29
Jose David Gonzalez	10,270	18.71
Alfonso I. Casso	5,764	10.50
Jorge Garza	1,628	2.97
Total votes	54,897	100.0

2026 Laredo mayoral election runoff
Candidate	Votes	%
Alyssa Cigarroa		
Victor Treviño (incumbent)		
Total votes		100.0

== See also ==
- 2026 Texas elections
