= 2026 Cobb County elections =

2026 Georgia local elections

- November 3, 2026

A general election was held in Cobb County, Georgia, on November 3, 2026, to elect various county-level positions. Partisan primary elections were held on May 19, 2026, alongside nonpartisan judicial elections in the county.

== Board of Commissioners ==
=== District 1 ===
==== Republican primary ====
===== Candidates =====
====== Nominee ======
- Keli Gambrill, incumbent commissioner

====== Eliminated in primary ======
- Clark Hungerford, retiree

===== Results =====
Republican primary
Party	Candidate	Votes	%
Republican	Keli Gambrill (incumbent)	16,072	71.70
Republican	Clark Hungerford	6,344	28.30
Total votes		22,416	100.00

==== General election ====
===== Results =====
2026 Cobb County Board of Commissioners District 1 election
Party	Candidate	Votes	%
Republican	Keli Gambrill (incumbent)	69,856	100.00
Total votes		69,856	100.00

=== District 3 ===
==== Republican primary ====
===== Candidates =====
====== Nominee ======
- JoAnn Birrell, incumbent commissioner

====== Eliminated in primary ======
- Chris Wasserman, head of a talent search firm

===== Results =====
Republican primary
Party	Candidate	Votes	%
Republican	JoAnn Birrell (incumbent)	16,000	72.24
Republican	Chris Wasserman	6,148	27.76
Total votes		22,148	100.00

==== Democratic primary ====
===== Candidates =====
====== Nominee ======
- Kevin Redmon, client executive and candidate for district 2 in 2024

===== Results =====
Democratic primary
Party	Candidate	Votes	%
Democratic	Kevin Redmon	18,229	100.00
Total votes		18,229	100.00

==== General election ====
===== Results =====
2026 Cobb County Board of Commissioners District 3 election
Party	Candidate	Votes	%
Democratic	Kevin Redmon	48,712	50.28
Republican	JoAnn Birrell (incumbent)	48,163	49.72
Total votes		96,875	100.00

== School Board ==
=== Post 2 ===
==== Democratic primary ====
===== Candidates =====
====== Nominee ======
- Becky Sayler, incumbent board member

===== Results =====
Democratic primary
Party	Candidate	Votes	%
Democratic	Becky Sayler (incumbent)		
Total votes			100.00

==== General election ====
===== Results =====
2026 Cobb County School Board Post 2 election
Party	Candidate	Votes	%
Democratic	Becky Sayler (incumbent)	32,726	100.00
Total votes		32,726	100.00

=== Post 4 ===
==== Republican primary ====
===== Candidates =====
====== Nominee ======
- David Chastain, incumbent board member

===== Results =====
Republican primary
Party	Candidate	Votes	%
Republican	David Chastain (incumbent)	9,193	100.00
Total votes		9,193	100.00

==== Democratic primary ====
===== Candidates =====
====== Nominee ======
- Michael Garza, website developer

====== Eliminated in primary ======
- Susan McCartney, retiree

===== Results =====
Democratic primary
Party	Candidate	Votes	%
Democratic	Michael Garza	5,016	50.39
Democratic	Susan McCartney	4,938	49.61
Total votes		9,954	100.00

==== General election ====
===== Results =====
2026 Cobb County School Board Post 4 election
Party	Candidate	Votes	%
Democratic	Michael Garza	25,487	54.85
Republican	David Chastain (incumbent)	20,977	45.15
Total votes		46,464	100.00

=== Post 6 ===
==== Democratic primary ====
===== Candidates =====
====== Nominee ======
- Nichelle Davis, incumbent board member

====== Eliminated in primary ======
- Jennifer Susko, school counselor

===== Results =====
Democratic primary
Party	Candidate	Votes	%
Democratic	Nichelle Davis (incumbent)	8,726	76.60
Democratic	Jennifer Susko	2,665	23.40
Total votes		11,391	100.00

==== General election ====
===== Results =====
2026 Cobb County School Board Post 6 election
Party	Candidate	Votes	%
Democratic	Nichelle Davis (incumbent)	31,583	100.00
Total votes		31,583	100.00

== Solicitor General ==
=== Democratic primary ===
==== Candidates ====
===== Nominee =====
- Makia Metzger, incumbent solicitor general

===== Eliminated in primary =====
- Christopher Futch, attorney

===== Results =====
Democratic primary
Party	Candidate	Votes	%
Democratic	Makia Metzger (incumbent)	69,209	77.46
Democratic	Christopher Futch	20,138	22.54
Total votes		89,347	100.00

=== General election ===
==== Results ====
2026 Cobb County Solicitor General election
Party	Candidate	Votes	%
Democratic	Makia Metzger (incumbent)	260,893	100.00
Total votes		260,893	100.00

== Surveyor ==
=== Republican primary ===
==== Candidates ====
===== Nominee =====
- Chris Evans, incumbent surveyor

==== Results ====
Republican primary
Party	Candidate	Votes	%
Republican	Chris Evans (incumbent)	52,874	100.00
Total votes		52,874	100.00

=== General election ===
==== Results ====
2026 Cobb County Surveyor election
Party	Candidate	Votes	%
Republican	Chris Evans (incumbent)	231,571	100.00
Total votes		231,571	100.00

== State Court ==
=== Division I, Post 5 ===
==== Results ====
General election
Candidate	Votes	%
Eric Brewton (incumbent)	133,864	100.00
Total votes	133,864	100.00

=== Division II, Post 1 ===
==== Results ====
General election
Candidate	Votes	%
Jason B. Fincher (incumbent)	133,795	100.00
Total votes	133,795	100.00

=== Division II, Post 4 ===
==== Results ====
General election
Candidate	Votes	%
Bridgette Campbell Glover (incumbent)	135,703	100.00
Total votes	135,703	100.00

=== Division II, Post 5 ===
==== Results ====
General election
Candidate	Votes	%
Ashley Palmer (incumbent)	136,007	100.00
Total votes	136,007	100.00
