= 2026 Macomb County Executive election =

- November 3, 2026
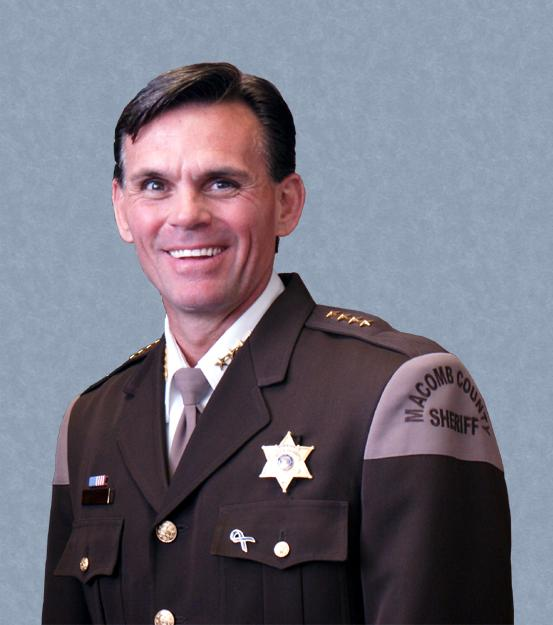

Candidate	Mark Hackel	Richard Moore
Party	Democratic	Republican
Popular vote	251,442	157,992
Percentage	61.25	38.48
County Executive before election
Mark Hackel
Democratic
Elected County Executive
Mark Hackel
Democratic

The 2026 Macomb County Executive election was held on November 3, 2026. Incumbent Democratic county executive Mark Hackel ran for a fifth term and defeated Republican Richard Moore in the general election.

== Background ==
Democrat Mark Hackel has been the Macomb County Executive since the position was created back in 2010. Since then, Hackel has been elected four times, defeating his opponents in landslides.

== Democratic primary ==
=== Candidate ===
==== Nominee ====
- Mark Hackel, incumbent executive (2011–present)

=== Results ===
Democratic primary results
Party	Candidate	Votes	%
Democratic	Mark Hackel (incumbent)	100,152	98.69
Write-in		1,328	1.31
Total votes		101,480	100.0

== Republican primary ==
=== Candidate ===
==== Nominee ====
- Richard Moore, Republican precinct delegate in 2022 and 2024

=== Results ===
Republican primary results
Party	Candidate	Votes	%
Republican	Richard Moore	67,143	99.34
Write-in		443	0.66
Total votes		67,586	100.0

== General election ==
=== Results ===
General election results
Party	Candidate	Votes	%
Democratic	Mark Hackel (incumbent)	251,442	61.25
Republican	Richard Moore	157,992	38.48
Write-in		1,095	0.27
Total votes		410,529	100.0
Democratic hold			
