= 2018 Wayne County Executive election =

- November 6, 2018
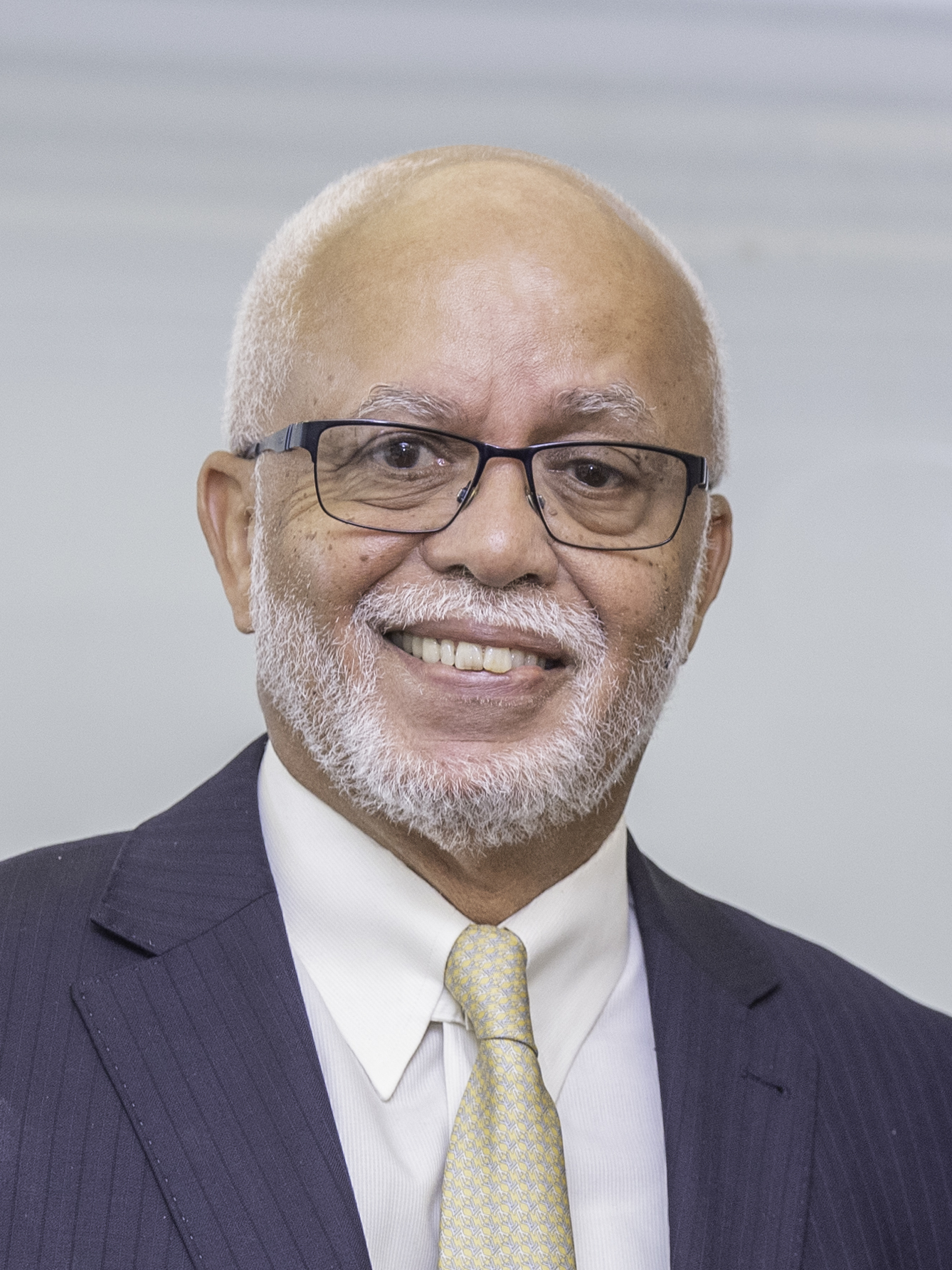

| Nominee | Warren Evans | Denis Curran |
| Party | Democratic | Republican |
| Popular vote | 458,238 | 163,664 |
| Percentage | 73.32% | 26.19% |
Wayne County Executive before election
Warren Evans
Democratic
Elected Wayne County Executive
Warren Evans
Democratic

The 2018 Wayne County Executive election was held on November 6, 2018. Incumbent County Executive Warren Evans ran for re-election to a second term. He was challenged by Republican nominee Denis Curran, a retired mechanical engineer. Evans defeated Curran in a landslide, winning 73 percent of the vote.

== Democratic primary ==
=== Candidates ===
- Warren Evans, incumbent County Executive

=== Results ===
Democratic primary results
| Party | Candidate | Votes | % |
|---|---|---|---|
| Democratic | Warren Evans (inc.) | 194,944 | 98.72% |
| Democratic | Write-ins | 2,529 | 1.28% |
| Total votes | | 197,473 | 100.00% |

== Republican primary ==
=== Candidates ===
- Denis Curran, retired mechanical engineer
- Adam Salam Adamski, businessman, perennial candidate

=== Results ===
Republican primary results
| Party | Candidate | Votes | % |
|---|---|---|---|
| Republican | Denis Curran | 57,005 | 87.38% |
| Republican | Adam Salam Adamski | 7,842 | 12.02% |
| Republican | Write-ins | 391 | 0.60% |
| Total votes | | 65,238 | 100.00% |

== General election ==
=== Results ===
2018 Wayne County Executive election
| Party | Candidate | Votes | % |
|---|---|---|---|
| Democratic | Warren Evans (inc.) | 458,238 | 73.32% |
| Republican | Denis Curran | 163,664 | 26.19% |
| Write-in | | 3,119 | 0.50% |
| Total votes | | 625,021 | 100.00% |
| Democratic hold | | | |
