= 2026 Lee County, Alabama, elections =

Local elections in Alabama

- November 3, 2026

A general election was held in Lee County, Alabama, on November 3, 2026, to elect various county officials. Primary elections were held on May 19.

== Sheriff ==
=== Republican primary ===
After Cam Hunt announced his intent to challenge incumbent Jay Jones in the primary, he was fired from his position. In Jones' termination letter sent to Hunt, Jones was clear that he fired him specifically because Hunt was running against him. Jones has served as the county sheriff since 1998.

==== Candidates ====
===== Nominee =====
- Cam Hunt, former deputy sheriff

===== Eliminated in primary =====
- Jay Jones, incumbent sheriff

==== Endorsements ====
Cam Hunt

Organizations

- Lee County Farmers Federation
- National Association for Gun Rights

==== Fundraising ====
Campaign finance reports as of May 18, 2026
| Candidate | Raised | Other receipts | Spent | Cash on hand |
|---|---|---|---|---|
| Cam Hunt (R) | $119,967 | $7,545 | $100,358 | $27,354 |
| Jay Jones (R) | $68,967 | $0 | $58,307 | $10,843 |
Source: Alabama FCPA

==== Results ====
Republican primary
| Party | Candidate | Votes | % |
|---|---|---|---|
| Republican | Cameron Hunt | 9,307 | 50.83 |
| Republican | Jay Jones (incumbent) | 9,004 | 49.17 |
| Total votes | | 18,311 | 100.00 |

=== General election ===
Supporters of Jay Jones organized an unofficial write-in campaign. Jones stated that he would serve another term if elected, but is not actively running a campaign.

==== Results ====
2026 Lee County Sheriff election
| Party | Candidate | Votes | % |
|---|---|---|---|
| Republican | Cam Hunt | | |
| Write-in | | | |
| Total votes | | | 100.00 |

== Coroner ==
=== Republican primary ===
==== Candidates ====
===== Nominee =====
- Daniel Sexton, incumbent coroner

===== Eliminated in primary =====
- Brian Allen, businessman

==== Results ====
Republican primary
| Party | Candidate | Votes | % |
|---|---|---|---|
| Republican | Daniel Sexton (incumbent) | 9,843 | 66.09 |
| Republican | Brian Allen | 5,051 | 33.91 |
| Total votes | | 14,894 | 100.00 |

=== General election ===
==== Results ====
2026 Lee County Coroner election
| Party | Candidate | Votes | % |
|---|---|---|---|
| Republican | Daniel Sexton (incumbent) | | |
| Write-in | | | |
| Total votes | | | 100.00 |

== County Commission ==
=== District 2 ===
==== Republican primary ====
===== Candidates =====
====== Declared ======
- Ross Morris, incumbent commissioner
- Angela Shepherd

===== Results =====
Republican primary
| Party | Candidate | Votes | % |
|---|---|---|---|
| Republican | Ross Morris (incumbent) | 1,891 | 60.71 |
| Republican | Angela Shepherd | 1,224 | 39.29 |
| Total votes | | 3,115 | 100.00 |

==== General election ====
===== Results =====
2026 Lee County Commission election, district 2
| Party | Candidate | Votes | % |
|---|---|---|---|
| Republican | Ross Morris (incumbent) | | |
| Write-in | | | |
| Total votes | | | 100.00 |

=== District 4 ===
==== Republican primary ====
===== Candidates =====
====== Nominee ======
- Tony Langley, incumbent commissioner

====== Eliminated in primary ======
- Harold Whatley

===== Results =====
Republican primary
| Party | Candidate | Votes | % |
|---|---|---|---|
| Republican | Tony Langley (incumbent) | 3,145 | 56.08 |
| Republican | Harold Whatley | 2,463 | 43.92 |
| Total votes | | 5,608 | 100.00 |

==== General election ====
===== Results =====
2026 Lee County Commission election, district 4
| Party | Candidate | Votes | % |
|---|---|---|---|
| Republican | Tony Langley (incumbent) | | |
| Write-in | | | |
| Total votes | | | 100.00 |

=== District 5 ===
==== Democratic primary ====
===== Candidates =====
====== Nominee ======
- Richard LaGrand Sr., incumbent commissioner

====== Eliminated in primary ======
- Derric Baker, community advocate

===== Results =====
Democratic primary
| Party | Candidate | Votes | % |
|---|---|---|---|
| Democratic | Richard LaGrand Sr. (incumbent) | 1,786 | 60.18 |
| Democratic | Derric A. Baker | 1,182 | 39.82 |
| Total votes | | 2,968 | 100.00 |

==== General election ====
===== Results =====
2026 Lee County Commission election, district 5
| Party | Candidate | Votes | % |
|---|---|---|---|
| Democratic | Richard LaGrand Sr. (incumbent) | | |
| Write-in | | | |
| Total votes | | | 100.00 |

== Circuit Court ==
=== Place 4 ===
==== Republican primary ====
===== Candidates =====
====== Nominee ======
- Seth H. Donaldson

=== General election ===
==== Results ====
2026 Lee County Circuit Court election, place 4
| Party | Candidate | Votes | % |
|---|---|---|---|
| Republican | Seth H. Donaldson | | |
| Write-in | | | |
| Total votes | | | 100.00 |
