= 2022 Wayne County Executive election =

- November 8, 2022
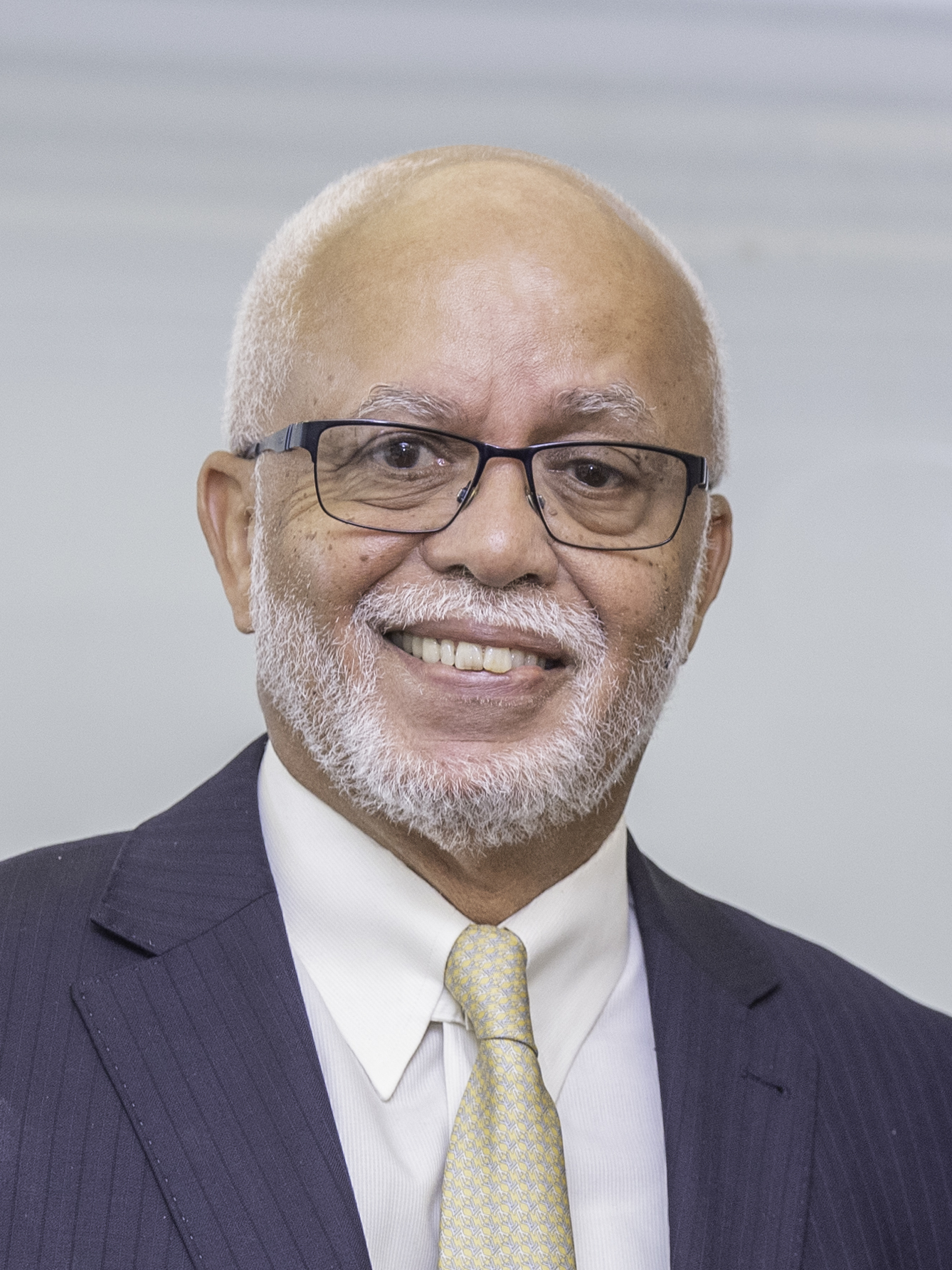

Nominee	Warren Evans	Mark Ashley Price
Party	Democratic	Republican
Popular vote	444,727	174,222
Percentage	71.68%	28.08%
Wayne County Executive before election
Warren Evans
Democratic
Elected Wayne County Executive
Warren Evans
Democratic

The 2022 Wayne County Executive election was held on November 8, 2022. Incumbent County Executive Warren Evans ran for re-election. He defeated businessman Mohammed Alam in the Democratic primary, and then faced Mark Ashley Price, the Republican nominee and a member of the Highland Park School Board, in the general election. Evans defeated Ashley in a landslide, winning his third term with 72 percent of the vote.

== Democratic primary ==
=== Candidates ===
- Warren Evans, incumbent County Executive
- Mohammed R. Alam, businessman, U.S. Army veteran

=== Results ===
Democratic primary results
Party	Candidate	Votes	%
Democratic	Warren Evans (inc.)	152,356	85.06%
Democratic	Mohammed R. Alam	25,935	14.48%
Democratic	Write-ins	830	0.46%
Total votes		179,121	100.00%

== Republican primary ==
=== Candidates ===
- Mark Ashley Price, Highland Park School Board member

=== Results ===
Republican primary results
Party	Candidate	Votes	%
Republican	Mark Ashley Price	65,020	99.39%
Republican	Write-ins	402	0.61%
Total votes		65,422	100.00%

== General election ==
=== Results ===
2022 Wayne County Executive election
Party	Candidate	Votes	%
Democratic	Warren Evans (inc.)	444,727	71.68%
Republican	Mark Ashley Price	174,222	28.08%
Write-in		1,481	0.24%
Total votes		620,430	100.00%
Democratic hold			
