= 2026 Anaheim mayoral election =

- November 3, 2026
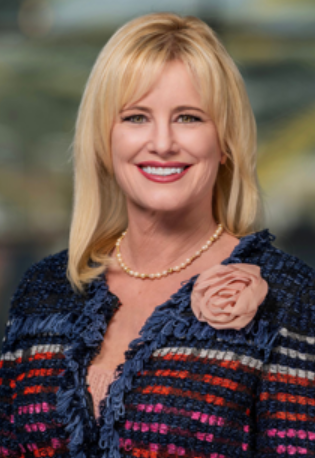

Candidate	Ashleigh Aitken	Alfredo Rodriguez	Imran Sharief
Popular vote	49,308	28,544	10,192
Percentage	56.00%	32.42%	11.58%
Mayor before election
Ashleigh Aitken
Elected mayor
Ashleigh Aitken

The 2026 Anaheim mayoral election was held on Tuesday November 3, to elect the next mayor of Anaheim, California. Municipal elections in California were officially nonpartisan; candidates' party affiliations do not appear on the ballot.

Incumbent one-term mayor Ashleigh Aitken, who was elected in 2022 with 42.9% of the vote, won re-election for the second term.

== Candidates ==
=== Declared ===
- Ashleigh Aitken (Democratic), incumbent mayor
- Alfredo Rodriguez, manager
- Imran Sharief, medic

== Results ==
2026 Anaheim mayoral election
Candidate	Votes	%
Ashleigh Aitken	49,308	56.00
Alfredo Rodriguez	28,544	32.42
Imran Sharief	10,192	11.58
Total votes	88,044	100.00
