= 2026 DeKalb County, Georgia, elections =

2026 Georgia local elections

- November 3, 2026

A general election was held in DeKalb County, Georgia, on November 3, 2026, to elect various county-level positions. Partisan primary elections were held on May 19, alongside nonpartisan judicial and school board elections in the county. Primary runoff elections were held on June 16 in races where no candidate received a majority of the vote.

== Board of Commissioners ==
=== District 2 ===
==== Democratic primary ====
===== Candidates =====
====== Nominee ======
- Michelle Spears, incumbent commissioner

===== Results =====
Democratic primary
Party	Candidate	Votes	%
Democratic	Michelle Spears (incumbent)	26,390	100.00
Total votes		26,390	100.00

==== Republican primary ====
===== Candidates =====
====== Nominee ======
- Ben Pepper

===== Results =====
Republican primary
Party	Candidate	Votes	%
Republican	Ben Pepper	4,918	100.00
Total votes		4,918	100.00

==== General election ====
===== Results =====
2026 DeKalb County Board of Commissioners District 2 election
Party	Candidate	Votes	%
Democratic	Michelle Spears (incumbent)	58,124	79.76
Republican	Ben Pepper	14,750	20.24
Total votes		72,874	100.00

=== District 3 ===
==== Democratic primary ====
===== Candidates =====
====== Nominee ======
- Keyanna Moore, environmental policy aide

====== Eliminated in primary ======
- Nicole Massiah, incumbent commissioner

====== Eliminated in primary ======
- Tommy Travis, entrepreneur
- Jake Walls, business owner and candidate for this district in 2024

===== Endorsements =====
Keyanna Moore

Organizations

- Georgia Conservation Voters
- Georgia Working Families Party

===== Results =====
Democratic primary
Party	Candidate	Votes	%
Democratic	Nicole Massiah (incumbent)	15,797	41.99
Democratic	Keyanna Moore	15,543	41.31
Democratic	Jake Walls	3,358	8.93
Democratic	Tommy Travis	2,923	7.77
Total votes		37,621	100.00

===== Runoff =====
====== Results ======
Democratic primary runoff
Party	Candidate	Votes	%
Democratic	Keyanna Moore	10,220	61.18
Democratic	Nicole Massiah (incumbent)	6,486	38.82
Total votes		16,706	100.00

==== Republican primary ====
===== Candidates =====
====== Nominee ======
- Andrea Smith

===== Results =====
Republican primary
Party	Candidate	Votes	%
Republican	Andrea Smith	839	100.00
Total votes		839	100.00

==== General election ====
===== Results =====
2026 DeKalb County Board of Commissioners District 3 election
Party	Candidate	Votes	%
Democratic	Keyanna Moore	68,110	95.43
Republican	Andrea Smith	3,260	4.57
Total votes		71,370	100.00

=== District 7 ===
==== Democratic primary ====
===== Candidates =====
====== Nominee ======
- Ladena Bolton, incumbent commissioner

====== Eliminated in primary ======
- Jacqueline Adams, businesswoman and candidate for this district in 2024
- Oneka Willabus, entrepreneur

===== Endorsements =====
Oneka Willabus

Organizations

- Georgia Conservation Voters

===== Results =====
Democratic primary
Party	Candidate	Votes	%
Democratic	Ladena Bolton (incumbent)	40,480	55.99
Democratic	Jacqueline Adams	23,029	31.57
Democratic	Oneka Willabus	9,070	12.44
Total votes		72,579	100.00

==== General election ====
===== Results =====
2026 DeKalb County Board of Commissioners District 7 election
Party	Candidate	Votes	%
Democratic	Ladena Bolton (incumbent)	145,428	100.00
Total votes		145,428	100.00

== School Board ==
=== District 2 ===
==== Candidates ====
===== Declared =====
- Ruth Goldstein, financial advisor
- Charlie McAdoo II, teacher
- Whitney McGinniss, incumbent board member

==== Results ====
General election
Candidate	Votes	%
Whitney McGinniss (incumbent)	10,915	54.32
Charlie McAdoo II	4,785	23.81
Ruth Goldstein	4,393	21.86
Total votes	20,093	100.00

=== District 4 ===
==== Candidates ====
===== Advanced to runoff =====
- Tracy Brisson, consultant and writer
- Sonja Szunski

===== Eliminated in general election =====
- Alison Cundiff, teacher
- Crew Heimer, railroad engineer
- Jamison Murphy, teacher

===== Declined =====
- Allyson Gevertz, incumbent board member

==== Results ====
General election
Candidate	Votes	%
Tracy Brisson	6,964	37.31
Sonja Szunski	3,961	21.22
Alison Cundiff	3,667	19.65
Crew Heimer	2,037	10.91
Jamison Murphy	2,037	10.91
Total votes	18,666	100.00

==== Runoff ====
===== Results =====
Runoff election
Candidate	Votes	%
Tracy Brisson	6,100	67.65
Sonja Szunski	2,917	32.35
Total votes	9,017	100.00

=== District 6 ===
==== Candidates ====
===== Declared =====
- Diijon DaCosta, incumbent board member

==== Results ====
General election
Candidate	Votes	%
Diijon DaCosta (incumbent)	18,949	100.00
Total votes	18,949	100.00

== Georgia Soil & Water Conservation District Supervisor ==
=== Candidates ===
==== Declared ====
- Jan Dunaway, incumbent supervisor
- Carol Hayes, incumbent supervisor

=== Results ===
General election (vote for up to 2)
Candidate	Votes	%
Carol Hayes (incumbent)	261,664	50.95
Jan Dunaway (incumbent)	251,942	49.05
Total votes	513,606	100.00
