= 2014 Macomb County Executive election =

- November 4, 2014
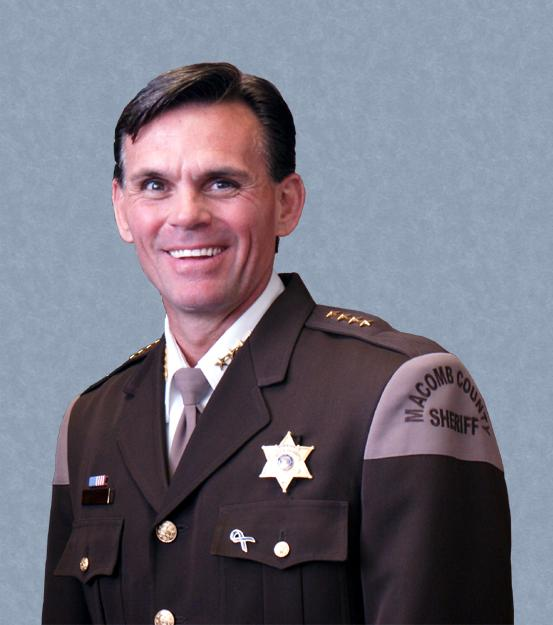

Nominee	Mark Hackel	David J. Novak
Party	Democratic	Republican
Popular vote	179,048	80,295
Percentage	69.04%	30.96%
County Executive before election
Mark Hackel
Democratic
Elected County Executive
Mark Hackel
Democratic

The 2014 Macomb County Executive election was held on November 4, 2014. Incumbent County Executive Mark Hackel ran for re-election to a second term. He faced businessman David Novak, the Republican nominee, in the general election, and won in a landslide, receiving 69 percent of the vote.

== Democratic primary ==
=== Candidates ===
- Mark Hackel, incumbent County Executive

=== Primary results ===
Democratic primary results
Party	Candidate	Votes	%
Democratic	Mark Hackel (inc.)	40,438	100.00%
Total votes		40,438	100.00%

== Republican primary ==
=== Candidates ===
- David J. Novak, businessman, 2010 Republican nominee for the State House
- Erin A. Stahl, former St. Clair Shores City Councilwoman, 2010 Libertarian nominee for County Executive
- Randell J. Shafer, 2010 Republican nominee for County Executive

=== Primary results ===
Republican primary results
Party	Candidate	Votes	%
Republican	David J. Novak	17,516	48.61%
Republican	Erin A. Stahl	12,887	35.76%
Republican	Randell J. Shafer	5,634	15.63%
Total votes		36,037	100.00%

== General election ==
=== Results ===
2014 Macomb County Executive election
Party	Candidate	Votes	%
Democratic	Mark Hackel (inc.)	179,048	69.04%
Republican	David J. Novak	80,295	30.96%
Total votes		259,343	100.00%
Democratic hold			
