= 2026 Raleigh mayoral election =

- November 3, 2026
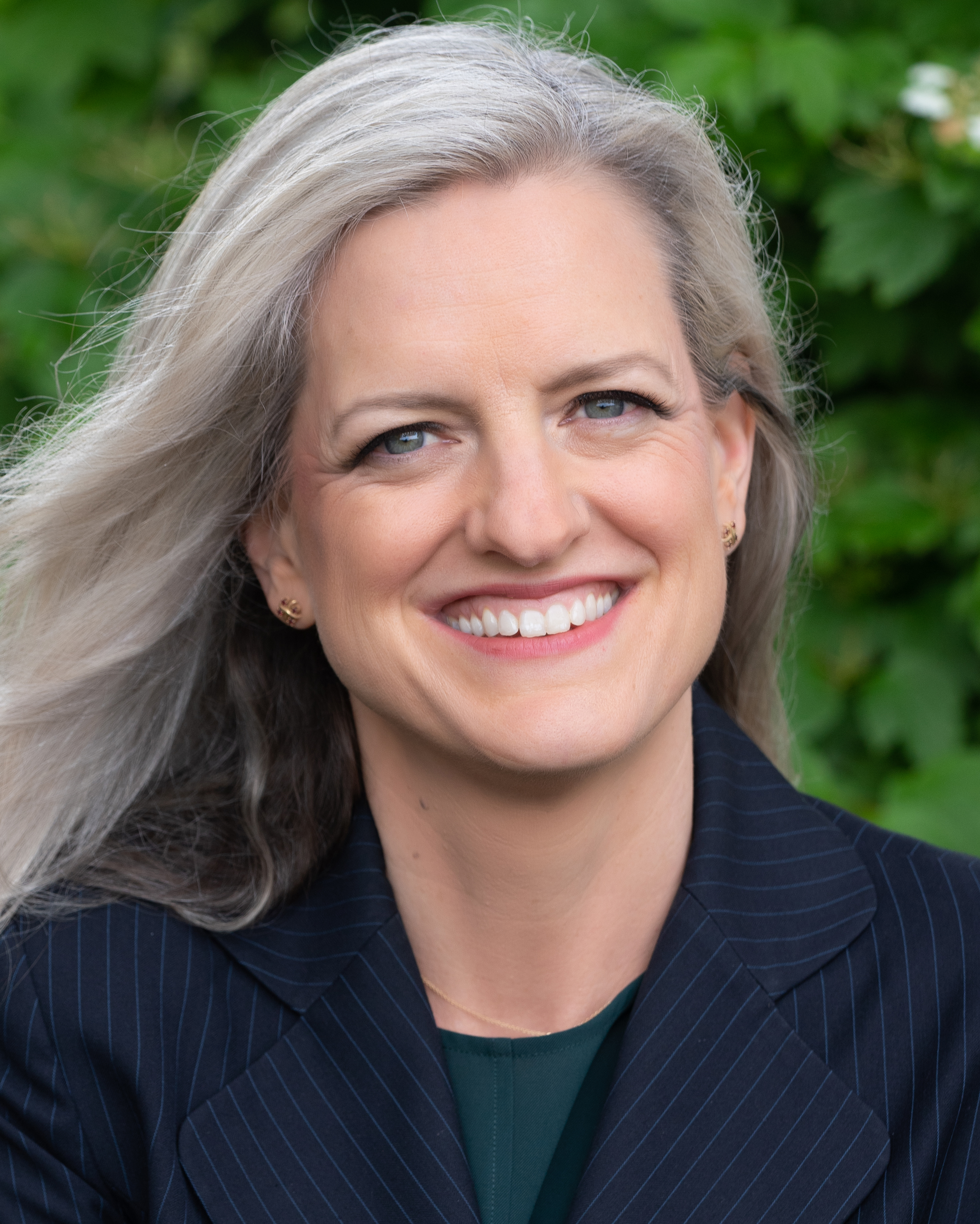

Candidate	Janet Cowell	Ashleigh Heath Armstrong
Party	Nonpartisan	Nonpartisan
Alliance	Democratic	Independent
Popular vote	142,543	30,038
Percentage	81.63%	17.20%
Mayor before election
Janet Cowell
Democratic
Elected mayor
Janet Cowell
Democratic

The 2026 Raleigh mayoral election was held on November 3, 2026 to elect the next mayor of Raleigh, North Carolina. Municipal elections in Raleigh are officially nonpartisan and for the first time are using the top-two primary system, but since only two candidates filled to run, both of them advanced to general without appearing on the ballot.

Incumbent mayor Janet Cowell won re-election for the second term.

== Candidates ==
=== Declared ===
- Janet Cowell, incumbent mayor (Party affiliation: Democratic)
- Ashleigh Heath Armstrong (Party affiliation: Independent)

== Results ==
2026 Raleigh mayoral election
Candidate	Votes	%
Janet Cowell (incumbent)	142,543	81.63
Ashleigh Heath Armstrong	30,038	17.20
Write-in	2,049	1.17
Total votes	174,630	100.00

== See also ==
- 2026 North Carolina elections
