= 2026 Shelby County, Alabama, elections =

Local elections in Alabama

- November 3, 2026

Elections were held in Shelby County, Alabama on November 3, 2026, to elect various county-level officials. Primary elections were held on May 19, and primary runoff elections were held on June 16 in races where no candidate received a majority of the vote.

== Sheriff ==
=== Republican primary ===
==== Candidates ====
===== Nominee =====
- John Samaniego, incumbent sheriff

===== Eliminated in primary =====
- Ken Bailey, perennial candidate

==== Results ====
Republican primary
Party	Candidate	Votes	%
Republican	John Samaniego (incumbent)	17,059	70.71
Republican	Ken Bailey	7,067	29.29
Total votes		24,126	100.00

=== Democratic primary ===
==== Candidates ====
===== Nominee =====
- Antonio Weatherly

=== General election ===
==== Results ====
2026 Shelby County Sheriff election
Party	Candidate	Votes	%
Republican	John Samaniego (incumbent)		
Democratic	Antonio Weatherly		
Write-in			
Total votes			100.00

== Coroner ==
=== Republican primary ===
==== Candidates ====
===== Nominee =====
- Lina Evans, incumbent coroner

=== Democratic primary ===
==== Candidates ====
===== Nominee =====
- Marsha S. Sturdevant

=== General election ===
==== Results ====
2026 Shelby County Coroner election
Party	Candidate	Votes	%
Republican	Lina Evans (incumbent)		
Democratic	Marsha S. Sturdevant		
Write-in			
Total votes			100.00

== Property Tax Commissioner ==
=== Republican primary ===
==== Candidates ====
===== Nominee =====
- Jacob Tidmore, incumbent property tax commissioner

===== Eliminated in primary =====
- Demus Copeland, attorney

==== Results ====
Republican primary
Party	Candidate	Votes	%
Republican	Jacob Tidmore (incumbent)	16,638	87.63
Republican	Demus Copeland	2,632	12.37
Total votes		21,270	100.00

=== Democratic primary ===
==== Candidates ====
===== Nominee =====
- MiChelle Vaughner Knight

=== General election ===
==== Results ====
2026 Shelby County Property Tax Commissioner election
Party	Candidate	Votes	%
Republican	Jacob Tidmore (incumbent)		
Democratic	MiChelle Vaughner Knight		
Write-in			
Total votes			100.00

== County Superintendent ==
=== Republican primary ===
==== Candidates ====
===== Nominee =====
- Andrew Gunn, principal of Oak Mountain High School

===== Eliminated in primary =====
- Joel Dixon, assistant superintendent of human resources

==== Results ====
Republican primary
Party	Candidate	Votes	%
Republican	Andrew Gunn	7,509	51.23
Republican	Joel C. Dixon	7,147	48.77
Total votes		14,656	100.00

=== General election ===
==== Results ====
2026 Shelby County Superintendent election
Party	Candidate	Votes	%
Republican	Andrew Gunn		
Write-in			
Total votes			100.00

== District Court ==
=== Place 3 ===
==== Republican primary ====
===== Candidates =====
====== Nominee ======
- Ben Fuller, prosecutor

====== Eliminated in primary ======
- Jay Welborn, deputy district attorney and small business owner

====== Eliminated in primary ======
- Kendell Lee Cash, attorney
- Mark Wilson, attorney

===== Results =====
Republican primary
Party	Candidate	Votes	%
Republican	Jarred "Jay" Welborn	7,733	33.60
Republican	Ben Fuller	6,831	29.68
Republican	Mark Wilson	5,715	24.83
Republican	Kendell Lee Cash	2,735	11.88
Total votes		23,014	100.00

===== Runoff =====
====== Results ======
Republican primary runoff
Party	Candidate	Votes	%
Republican	Ben Fuller	9,167	52.19
Republican	Jarred "Jay" Welborn	8,398	47.81
Total votes		17,565	100.00

==== General election ====
===== Results =====
2026 Shelby County District Court election, place 3
Party	Candidate	Votes	%
Republican	Ben Fuller		
Write-in			
Total votes			100.00

== School Board ==
=== District 3 ===
==== Republican primary ====
===== Candidates =====
====== Nominee ======
- Peg Hill, incumbent board member

====== Eliminated in primary ======
- Larry Haynes

===== Results =====
Republican primary
Party	Candidate	Votes	%
Republican	Peg Hill (incumbent)	7,302	52.36
Republican	Larry Haynes	6,643	47.64
Total votes		13,945	100.00

==== Democratic primary ====
===== Candidates =====
====== Nominee ======
- James Carroll

==== General election ====
===== Results =====
2026 Shelby County Board of Education election, district 3
Party	Candidate	Votes	%
Republican	Peg Hill (incumbent)		
Democratic	James Carroll		
Write-in			
Total votes			100.00
