= 2022 Macomb County Executive election =

- November 8, 2022
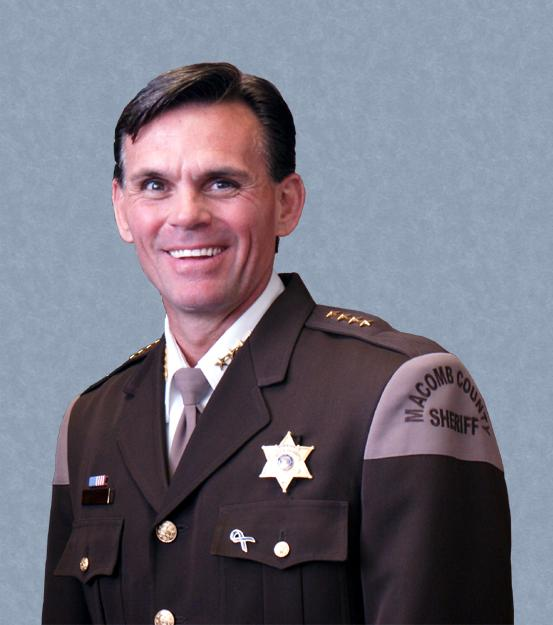

Nominee	Mark Hackel	Nicholyn Brandenburg
Party	Democratic	Republican
Popular vote	229,940	144,207
Percentage	61.46%	38.54%
County Executive before election
Mark Hackel
Democratic
Elected County Executive
Mark Hackel
Democratic

The 2022 Macomb County Executive election was held on November 8, 2022. Incumbent County Executive Mark Hackel ran for re-election to a fourth term. He was challenged by former County Commissioner Nicholyn Brandenburg, the Republican nominee. Despite Donald Trump's strong performance in the county in the 2016 and 2020 presidential elections, Hackel defeated Brandenburg in a landslide, winning 61 percent of the vote.

== Democratic primary ==
=== Candidates ===
- Mark Hackel, incumbent County Executive

=== Primary results ===
Democratic primary results
Party	Candidate	Votes	%
Democratic	Mark Hackel (inc.)	68,741	100.00%
Total votes		68,741	100.00%

== Republican primary ==
=== Candidates ===
- Nicholyn Brandenburg, former Macomb County Commissioner

=== Primary results ===
Republican primary results
Party	Candidate	Votes	%
Republican	Nicholyn Brandenburg	74,225	100.00%
Total votes		74,225	100.00%

== General election ==
=== Results ===
2022 Macomb County Executive election
Party	Candidate	Votes	%
Democratic	Mark Hackel (inc.)	229,940	61.46%
Republican	Nicholyn Brandenburg	144,207	38.54%
Total votes		374,147	100.00%
Democratic hold			
