= 2026 Baldwin County, Alabama, elections =

Local elections in Alabama

- November 3, 2026

A general election was held in Baldwin County, Alabama, on November 3, 2026, to elect various county officials. Primary elections were held on May 19, and primary runoff elections were held on June 16 in races where no candidate received a majority of the vote.

== Sheriff ==
Incumbent Republican sheriff Anthony Lowery was appointed in 2024.

=== Republican primary ===
Candidates spoke at their first public forum in September 2025.

==== Candidates ====
===== Nominee =====
- Anthony Lowery, incumbent sheriff

===== Eliminated in primary =====
- Matt McKenzie, county commissioner from the 2nd district

==== Results ====
Republican primary
Party	Candidate	Votes	%
Republican	Anthony E. Lowery (incumbent)	16,514	51.91
Republican	Matt McKenzie	15,297	48.09
Total votes		31,811	100.00

== Coroner ==
=== Republican primary ===
==== Candidates ====
===== Potential =====
- Brian Pierce, incumbent coroner

== Revenue commissioner ==
=== Republican primary ===
==== Candidates ====
===== Potential =====
- Teddy Faust, incumbent commissioner

== County commission ==
=== District 1 ===
==== Republican primary ====
===== Candidates =====
====== Nominee ======
- Richard Cox, forestry professional

====== Eliminated in primary ======
- Jeb Ball, incumbent commissioner

===== Endorsements =====
Richard Cox

Organizations

- Alabama Farmers Federation

===== Results =====
Republican primary
Party	Candidate	Votes	%
Republican	Richard Cox	14,167	51.70
Republican	James E. "Jeb" Ball (incumbent)	13,236	48.30
Total votes		27,403	100.00

=== District 2 ===
==== Republican primary ====
===== Candidates =====
====== Nominee ======
- Angelo Fermo, retired Department of Homeland Security agent

====== Eliminated in primary ======
- Kyle Henderson, attorney and former district attorney

====== Declined ======
- Matt McKenzie, incumbent commissioner (running for sheriff)

===== Endorsements =====
Angelo Fermo

Organizations

- Alabama Farmers Federation

===== Results =====
Republican primary
Party	Candidate	Votes	%
Republican	Angelo Fermo	14,173	50.55
Republican	Kyle J. Henderson	13,865	49.45
Total votes		28,038	100.00

=== District 3 ===
==== Republican primary ====
===== Candidates =====
====== Nominee ======
- Billie Jo Underwood, incumbent commissioner

====== Eliminated in primary ======
- Kevin Brock
- Phillip Dembrowski

===== Results =====
Republican primary
Party	Candidate	Votes	%
Republican	Billie Jo Underwood (incumbent)	15,488	53.72
Republican	Kevin Brock	8,119	28.16
Republican	Philip Dembrowski	5,222	18.11
Total votes		28,829	100.00

=== District 4 ===
==== Republican primary ====
===== Candidates =====
====== Nominee ======
- John "Tater" Harris, small business owner

====== Eliminated in runoff ======
- Brett Gaar

====== Eliminated in primary ======
- Travey Gambill

====== Declined ======
- Charles Gruber, incumbent commissioner

===== Endorsements =====
John "Tater" Harris

Organizations

- Alabama Farmers Federation

===== Results =====
Republican primary
Party	Candidate	Votes	%
Republican	John "Tater" Harris	13,563	47.42
Republican	Brett Gaar	8,243	28.82
Republican	Tracey Gambill	6,796	23.76
Total votes		28,602	100.00

===== Runoff =====
====== Results ======
Republican primary runoff
Party	Candidate	Votes	%
Republican	John "Tater" Harris	10,719	54.85
Republican	Brett Gaar	8,824	45.15
Total votes		19,543	100.00

== District court ==
=== Place 1 ===
==== Republican primary ====
===== Candidates =====
====== Nominee ======
- Grant Blackburn, lawyer

====== Eliminated in primary ======
- Liam Scully, attorney (previously ran for circuit court judge)

===== Results =====
Republican primary
Party	Candidate	Votes	%
Republican	Grant Blackburn	14,637	50.70
Republican	William "Liam" Scully	14,231	49.30
Total votes		28,868	100.00

== Circuit court ==
=== Place 5 ===
==== Republican primary ====
===== Candidates =====
====== Declared ======
- Lauri Hoyt, incumbent judge

=== Place 7 ===
==== Republican primary ====
===== Candidates =====
====== Nominee ======
- Kristi Hagood, prosecutor

====== Eliminated in primary ======
- Jeremiah Giles, attorney

===== Results =====
Republican primary
Party	Candidate	Votes	%
Republican	Kristi Hagood	18,867	62.72
Republican	Jeremiah Giles	11,216	37.28
Total votes		30,083	100.00

== School board ==
=== District 5 ===
==== Republican primary ====
===== Candidates =====
====== Nominee ======
- Jason Woerner

====== Eliminated in primary ======
- Whitney Scapecchi

===== Results =====
Republican primary
Party	Candidate	Votes	%
Republican	Jason P. Woerner	2,259	64.56
Republican	Whitney Scapecchi	1,240	35.44
Total votes		3,499	100.00
