= 2026 Lancaster County, Nebraska, elections =

2026 Nebraska local election

2026 Lancaster County elections
- November 3, 2026

A general election was held in Lancaster County, Nebraska, on November 3, 2026. Primary elections were held on May 12.

== County Clerk ==
=== Democratic primary ===
==== Candidates ====
===== Nominee =====
- Matt Hansen, incumbent clerk

=== General election ===
==== Results ====
2026 Lancaster County Clerk election
Party	Candidate	Votes	%
Democratic	Matt Hansen (incumbent)	82,524	95.87
Write-in		3,551	4.13
Total votes		86,075	100.00

== Clerk of the District Court ==
=== Democratic primary ===
==== Candidates ====
===== Nominee =====
- Kristen Anderson, former chief deputy treasurer

===== Eliminated in primary =====
- Simon Rezac, incumbent clerk of the district court

==== Results ====
Democratic primary
Party	Candidate	Votes	%
Democratic	Kristen Anderson	18,953	72.80
Democratic	Simon Rezac (incumbent)	7,010	26.92
Write-in		73	0.28
Total votes		26,036	100.00

=== Republican primary ===
==== Candidates ====
===== Nominee =====
- Landon Parks, Nebraska Crime Commission employee

=== General election ===
==== Results ====
2026 Lancaster County Clerk of the District Court election
Party	Candidate	Votes	%
Democratic	Kristen Anderson	65,391	56.21
Republican	Landon Parks	50,807	43.67
Write-in		146	0.13
Total votes		116,344	100.00

== County Treasurer ==
=== Democratic primary ===
==== Candidates ====
===== Nominee =====
- Rachel Garver, incumbent treasurer

=== Republican primary ===
==== Candidates ====
===== Nominee =====
- Jasmine Gibson, candidate for treasurer in 2022

=== General election ===
==== Results ====
2026 Lancaster County Treasurer election
Party	Candidate	Votes	%
Democratic	Rachel Garver (incumbent)	68,613	58.34
Republican	Jasmine Gibson	48,827	41.52
Write-in		161	0.14
Total votes		117,601	100.00

== Sheriff ==
=== Republican primary ===
==== Candidates ====
===== Nominee =====
- Ben Houchin, chief deputy

===== Declined =====
- Terry Wagner, incumbent sheriff (endorsed Houchin)

=== Democratic primary ===
==== Candidates ====
===== Nominee =====
- Jay Pitts, law enforcement officer

=== General election ===
==== Results ====
2026 Lancaster County Sheriff election
Party	Candidate	Votes	%
Democratic	Jay Pitts	70,387	58.82
Republican	Ben Houchin	49,078	41.01
Write-in		202	0.17
Total votes		119,667	100.00

== County Attorney ==
=== Republican primary ===
==== Candidates ====
===== Nominee =====
- Pat Condon, incumbent attorney

=== Democratic primary ===
==== Candidates ====
===== Nominee =====
- Randall Ritnour, former Gage County attorney

=== General election ===
==== Results ====
2026 Lancaster County Attorney election
Party	Candidate	Votes	%
Democratic	Randall Ritnour	63,432	53.66
Republican	Pat Condon (incumbent)	54,617	46.20
Write-in		159	0.13
Total votes		118,208	100.00

== County Public Defender ==
=== Democratic primary ===
==== Candidates ====
===== Nominee =====
- Kristi Egger, incumbent public defender

===== Eliminated in primary =====
- Sarah Newell, deputy public defender

==== Results ====
Democratic primary
Party	Candidate	Votes	%
Democratic	Kristi Egger (incumbent)	13,889	51.31
Democratic	Sarah Newell	13,149	48.58
Write-in		30	0.11
Total votes		27,068	100.00

=== General election ===
==== Results ====
2026 Lancaster County Public Defender election
Party	Candidate	Votes	%
Democratic	Kristi Egger (incumbent)	83,614	96.58
Write-in		2,965	3.42
Total votes		86,579	100.00

== County Engineer ==
=== Republican primary ===
==== Candidates ====
===== Nominee =====
- Pam Dingman, incumbent engineer

=== General election ===
==== Results ====
2026 Lancaster County Engineer election
Party	Candidate	Votes	%
Republican	Pam Dingman (incumbent)	78,468	94.85
Write-in		4,258	5.15
Total votes		82,726	100.00

== County Assessor/Register of Deeds ==
=== Democratic primary ===
==== Candidates ====
===== Nominee =====
- Dan Nolte, incumbent assessor/register of deeds

===== Eliminated in primary =====
- Doug Guess, county geospatial administrator

==== Results ====
Democratic primary
Party	Candidate	Votes	%
Democratic	Dan Nolte (incumbent)	15,888	60.67
Democratic	Doug Guess	10,242	39.11
Write-in		56	0.21
Total votes		26,186	100.00

=== Republican primary ===
==== Candidates ====
===== Nominee =====
- Tim Johns, assessor employee

=== General election ===
==== Results ====
2026 Lancaster County Assessor/Register of Deeds election
Party	Candidate	Votes	%
Democratic	Dan Nolte (incumbent)	68,367	58.86
Republican	Tim Johns	47,617	41.00
Write-in		162	0.14
Total votes		116,146	100.00

== Board of Commissioners ==
=== District 1 ===
==== Democratic primary ====
===== Candidates =====
====== Nominee ======
- Sean Flowerday, incumbent commissioner

==== General election ====
===== Results =====
2026 Lancaster County Board of Commissioners election, district 1
Party	Candidate	Votes	%
Democratic	Sean Flowerday (incumbent)	16,938	96.67
Write-in		583	3.33
Total votes		17,521	100.00

=== District 3 ===
==== Republican primary ====
===== Candidates =====
====== Nominee ======
- Matt Schulte, incumbent commissioner

====== Eliminated in primary ======
- Dave Wieting, small business owner

===== Results =====
Republican primary
Party	Candidate	Votes	%
Republican	Matt Schulte (incumbent)	5,886	76.31
Republican	Dave Wieting	1,791	23.22
Write-in		36	0.47
Total votes		7,713	100.00

==== General election ====
===== Results =====
2026 Lancaster County Board of Commissioners election, district 3
Party	Candidate	Votes	%
Republican	Matt Schulte (incumbent)	18,071	56.98
Independent	Bryan Seck	13,582	42.83
Write-in		61	0.19
Total votes		31,714	100.00

=== District 5 ===
==== Democratic primary ====
===== Candidates =====
====== Nominee ======
- Rick Vest, incumbent commissioner

==== General election ====
===== Results =====
2026 Lancaster County Board of Commissioners election, district 5
Party	Candidate	Votes	%
Democratic	Rick Vest (incumbent)	13,206	95.66
Write-in		599	4.34
Total votes		13,805	100.00
