= 2026 Chandler mayoral election =

- July 21, 2026

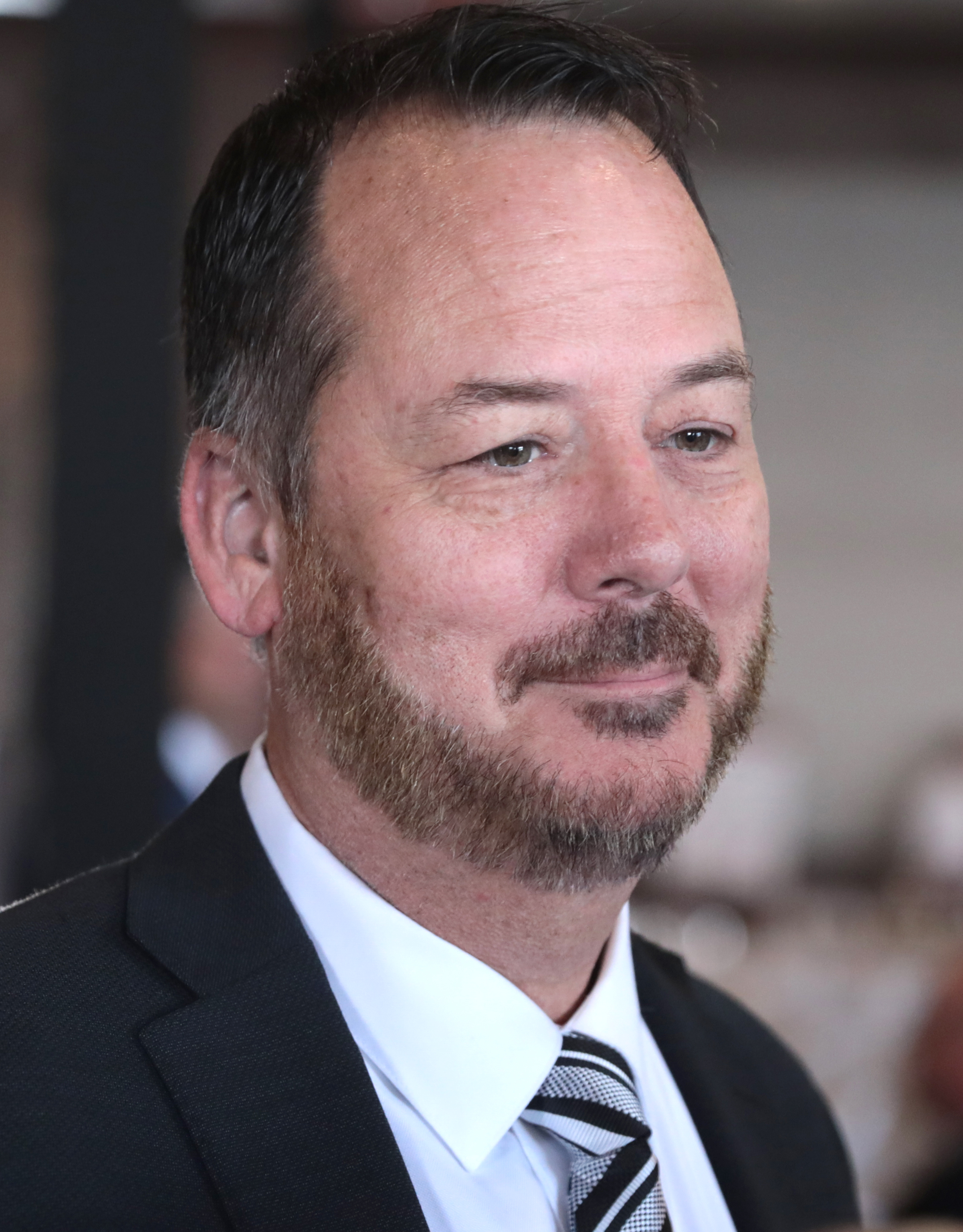
Candidate	Matt Orlando	Jeff Weninger
Popular vote	25,319	17,991
Percentage	58.46%	41.54%
Mayor before election
Kevin Hartke
Republican
Elected mayor
Matt Orlando
Democratic

The 2026 Chandler mayoral election was held on July 21, 2026, to elect the mayor of Chandler. Incumbent Republican mayor Kevin Hartke was term-limited and ineligible to seek re-election. A general election was planned for November 3, coinciding with the 2026 Midterm elections, but since only two candidates filed to run this was not necessary.

Democratic City Councilmember Matt Orlando won the election with 58.46% of the vote, defeating Republican Arizona state representative Jeff Weninger.

All Chandler city municipal elections are non-partisan, but candidates can be affiliated with a political party.

== Candidates ==
=== Declared ===
- Matt Orlando, City Councilmember (2019–present) (Democratic)
- Jeff Weninger, Arizona state representative (2025–present) (Republican)

== Results ==
2026 Chandler mayoral election
Candidate	Votes	%
Matt Orlando	25,319	58.46
Jeff Weninger	17,991	41.54
Total votes	43,310	100.00
