= 2026 Wake County elections =

Local elections in North Carolina

- November 3, 2026

A general election was held in Wake County, North Carolina, on November 3, 2026, to elect various county-level officials. Primary elections were held on March 3.

== District Attorney ==
Incumbent Democratic district attorney Lorrin Freeman retired. Wiley Nickel won the Democratic primary election and faces no opposition in the general election.

== Board of Commissioners ==
=== At-large (2 seats) ===
==== Democratic primary ====
===== Candidates =====
====== Nominees ======
- Christine Kushner, former Wake County school board member
- Mona Singh, technology consultant

====== Eliminated in primary ======
- Marguerite Creel, tutoring business owner and candidate for the North Carolina House of Representatives in 2022
- Jonathan Lambert-Melton, at-large member of the Raleigh City Council (2019–present)
- Kimberly McGhee, entrepreneur
- Robert Mitchener Jr., former deputy sheriff
- Steve Rao, at-large member of the Morrisville Town Council

===== Endorsements =====
Christine Kushner

Newspapers

- The News & Observer
Jonathan Lambert-Melton

Newspapers

- The News & Observer

===== Results =====
Democratic primary (vote for up to 2)
| Party | Candidate | Votes | % |
|---|---|---|---|
| Democratic | Christine Kushner | 68,562 | 29.61 |
| Democratic | Mona Singh | 50,604 | 21.86 |
| Democratic | Jonathan Lambert-Melton | 41,695 | 18.01 |
| Democratic | Kimberly McGhee | 25,379 | 10.96 |
| Democratic | Steve S. Rao | 25,108 | 10.85 |
| Democratic | Robert Mitchener Jr. | 11,529 | 4.98 |
| Democratic | Marguerite Creel | 8,635 | 3.73 |
| Total votes | | 231,512 | 100.00 |

==== Republican primary ====
===== Candidates =====
====== Nominees ======
- Gary Dale Hartong, engineering firm president
- Kyle Stogoski

==== General election ====
===== Results =====
2026 Wake County Board of Commissioners at-large election (vote for up to 2)
| Party | Candidate | Votes | % |
|---|---|---|---|
| Democratic | Mona Singh | 326,008 | 36.80 |
| Democratic | Christine Kushner | 298,865 | 33.74 |
| Republican | Kyle Stogoski | 134,748 | 15.21 |
| Republican | Gary Dale Hartong | 126,279 | 14.25 |
| Total votes | | 885,900 | 100.00 |

== Clerk of Superior Court ==
=== Democratic primary ===
==== Candidates ====
===== Nominee =====
- Claudia Croom, incumbent clerk of superior court

=== Republican primary ===
==== Candidates ====
===== Nominee =====
- Joe Teague Jr., engineer

=== General election ===
==== Results ====
2026 Wake County Clerk of Superior Court election
| Party | Candidate | Votes | % |
|---|---|---|---|
| Democratic | Claudia Croom (incumbent) | 362,340 | 70.37 |
| Republican | Joe Teague Jr. | 152,582 | 29.63 |
| Total votes | | 514,922 | 100.00 |

== Sheriff ==
=== Democratic primary ===
==== Candidates ====
===== Nominee =====
- Willie Rowe, incumbent sheriff

=== Republican primary ===
==== Candidates ====
===== Nominee =====
- Kenny Blackwell, law enforcement officer

=== General election ===
==== Results ====
2026 Wake County Sheriff election
| Party | Candidate | Votes | % |
|---|---|---|---|
| Democratic | Willie Rowe (incumbent) | 364,020 | 70.51 |
| Republican | Kenny Blackwell | 152,276 | 29.49 |
| Total votes | | 516,296 | 100.00 |
