= 2026 Dallas County elections =

Local elections in Texas

- November 3, 2026

A general election was held in Dallas County, Texas, on November 3, 2026, to elect various county-level positions. Primary elections were held on March 3, and primary runoff elections were held on May 26 in races where no candidate received a majority of the vote.

== County Judge ==
=== Democratic primary ===
==== Candidates ====
===== Nominee =====
- Clay Jenkins, incumbent county judge

==== Results ====
Democratic primary
Party	Candidate	Votes	%
Democratic	Clay Jenkins (incumbent)	240,073	100.00
Total votes		240,073	100.00

=== Republican primary ===
==== Candidates ====
===== Nominee =====
- Mike Immler, veteran

==== Results ====
Republican primary
Party	Candidate	Votes	%
Republican	Mike Immler	76,957	100.00
Total votes		76,957	100.00

=== General election ===
==== Results ====
2026 Dallas County Judge election
Party	Candidate	Votes	%
Democratic	Clay Jenkins (incumbent)	538,581	70.13
Republican	Mike Immler	229,416	29.87
Total votes		767,997	100.00

== District Attorney ==
=== Democratic primary ===
==== Candidates ====
===== Nominee =====
- Amber Givens-Davis, former district court judge

===== Eliminated in primary =====
- John Creuzot, incumbent district attorney

==== Results ====
Democratic primary
Party	Candidate	Votes	%
Democratic	Amber Givens-Davis	134,422	53.85
Democratic	John Creuzot (incumbent)	115,219	46.15
Total votes		249,641	100.00

=== Independent candidate ===
==== Write-in ====
- Eric Reed, attorney

=== General election ===
==== Results ====
2026 Dallas County District Attorney election
Party	Candidate	Votes	%
Democratic	Amber Givens-Davis	593,230	95.48
Write-in		28,067	4.52
Total votes		621,297	100.00

== District Clerk ==
=== Democratic primary ===
==== Candidates ====
===== Nominee =====
- Felicia Pitre, incumbent district clerk

==== Results ====
Democratic primary
Party	Candidate	Votes	%
Democratic	Felicia Pitre (incumbent)	233,858	100.00
Total votes		233,858	100.00

=== Republican primary ===
==== Candidates ====
===== Nominee =====
- Dave Muehlhaeusler

==== Results ====
Republican primary
Party	Candidate	Votes	%
Republican	Dave Muehlhaeusler	76,623	100.00
Total votes		76,623	100.00

=== General election ===
==== Results ====
2026 Dallas County District Clerk election
Party	Candidate	Votes	%
Democratic	Felicia Pitre (incumbent)	530,753	69.56
Republican	Dave Muehlhaeusler	232,316	30.44
Total votes		763,069	100.00

== County Clerk ==
=== Democratic primary ===
==== Candidates ====
===== Nominee =====
- Damarcus Offord, senior manager for Dallas Area Rapid Transit

===== Eliminated in runoff =====
- Ann Marie Cruz, county employee

===== Eliminated in primary =====
- Tony Grimes, former Irving school board trustee

===== Declined =====
- John Warren, incumbent county clerk (endorsed Offord)

==== Results ====
Democratic primary
Party	Candidate	Votes	%
Democratic	Ann Marie Cruz	106,592	43.35
Democratic	Damarcus Offord	96,299	39.17
Democratic	Tony Grimes	42,988	17.48
Total votes		245,879	100.00

==== Runoff ====
===== Results =====
Democratic primary runoff
Party	Candidate	Votes	%
Democratic	Damarcus Offord	43,359	64.70
Democratic	Ann Marie Cruz	23,659	35.30
Total votes		67,018	100.00

=== Republican primary ===
==== Candidates ====
===== Nominee =====
- Skye Garcia

==== Results ====
Republican primary
Party	Candidate	Votes	%
Republican	Skye Garcia	76,721	100.00
Total votes		76,721	100.00

=== General election ===
==== Results ====
2026 Dallas County Clerk election
Party	Candidate	Votes	%
Democratic	Damarcus Offord	525,923	68.87
Republican	Skye Garcia	237,739	31.13
Total votes		763,662	100.00

== County Treasurer ==
=== Democratic primary ===
==== Candidates ====
===== Nominee =====
- Pauline Medrano, incumbent county treasurer

==== Results ====
Democratic primary
Party	Candidate	Votes	%
Democratic	Pauline Medrano (incumbent)	233,258	100.00
Total votes		233,258	100.00

=== Republican primary ===
==== Candidates ====
===== Nominee =====
- Corsandra Brigham Phelps

==== Results ====
Republican primary
Party	Candidate	Votes	%
Republican	Corsandra Brigham Phelps	76,354	100.00
Total votes		76,354	100.00

=== General election ===
==== Results ====
2026 Dallas County Treasurer election
Party	Candidate	Votes	%
Democratic	Pauline Medrano (incumbent)	530,839	69.48
Republican	Corsandra Brigham Phelps	233,225	30.52
Total votes		764,064	100.00

== Commissioners Court ==
=== Precinct 2 ===
==== Democratic primary ====
===== Candidates =====
====== Nominee ======
- Andrew Sommerman, incumbent county commissioner

===== Results =====
Democratic primary
Party	Candidate	Votes	%
Democratic	Andrew Sommerman (incumbent)	57,554	100.00
Total votes		57,554	100.00

==== Republican primary ====
===== Candidates =====
====== Nominee ======
- Barry Wernick

====== Eliminated in primary ======
- Blake Clemens

===== Results =====
Republican primary
Party	Candidate	Votes	%
Republican	Barry Wernick	19,322	57.40
Republican	Blake Clemens	14,339	42.60
Total votes		33,661	100.00

==== General election ====
===== Results =====
2026 Dallas County Commissioners Court election, precinct 2
Party	Candidate	Votes	%
Democratic	Andrew Sommerman (incumbent)	138,318	59.59
Republican	Barry Wernick	93,792	40.41
Total votes		232,110	100.00

=== Precinct 4 ===
==== Democratic primary ====
===== Candidates =====
====== Nominee ======
- Elba Garcia, incumbent county commissioner

===== Results =====
Democratic primary
Party	Candidate	Votes	%
Democratic	Elba Garcia (incumbent)	45,862	100.00
Total votes		45,862	100.00

==== General election ====
===== Results =====
2026 Dallas County Commissioners Court election, precinct 4
Party	Candidate	Votes	%
Democratic	Elba Garcia (incumbent)	122,455	100.00
Total votes		122,455	100.00

== Proposition A ==
In August 2026, by a 3-2 vote, the Dallas County Commissioners' Court approved Proposition A, a referendum for an ad valorem tax increase of 2.4 cents per $100 valuation. The increase, which would raise approximately $100 million per year, would be used to fund homelessness support programs. The referendum was required by state law, as the new rate was greater than the county's voter-approval tax rate.

The measure failed to pass, with 52% of voters opposed.

=== Results ===
Dallas County Proposition A
Choice	Votes	%
For	338,919	48.14
Against	365,039	51.86
Total	703,958	100.00
