= 2010 Macomb County Executive election =

- November 2, 2010
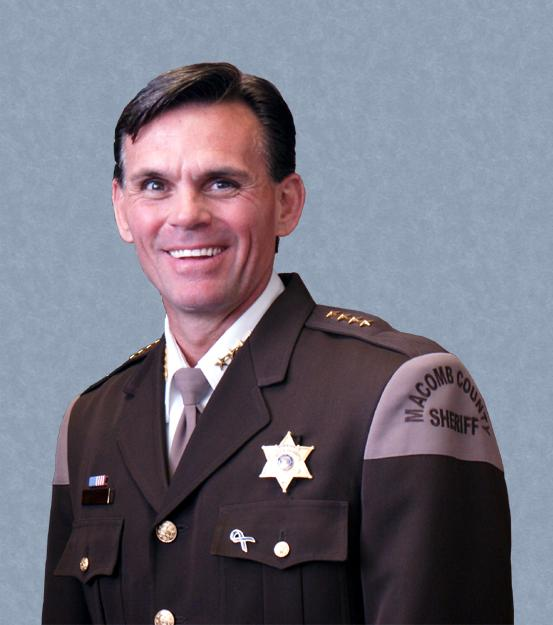

Nominee	Mark Hackel	Randell J. Shafer
Party	Democratic	Republican
Popular vote	174,245	81,981
Percentage	65.82%	30.97%
County Executive before election
Position established
Elected County Executive
Mark Hackel
Democratic

The 2010 Macomb County Executive election was held on November 2, 2010. The 2010 election was the first election for the position after voters approved the Macomb County Charter in a 2009 election. Sheriff Mark Hackel won the Democratic nomination unopposed and faced Republican nominee Randell Shafer, a retired U.S. Army officer, and former St. Clair Shores City Councilwoman Erin Stahl, the Libertarian nominee, in the general election. Despite Republicans' success in the state in 2010, Hackel defeated Shafer by a landslide to win his first term.

== Democratic primary ==
=== Candidates ===
- Mark Hackel, Macomb County Sheriff

=== Primary results ===
Democratic primary results
Party	Candidate	Votes	%
Democratic	Mark Hackel	46,992	100.00%
Total votes		46,992	100.00%

== Republican primary ==
=== Candidates ===
- Randell J. Shafer, retired U.S. Army officer
- Simon Haddad, Clinton Township businessman

=== Primary results ===
Republican primary results
Party	Candidate	Votes	%
Republican	Randell J. Shafer	45,122	71.70%
Republican	Simon Haddad	17,814	28.30%
Total votes		62,936	100.00%

== General election ==
=== Results ===
2010 Macomb County Executive election
Party	Candidate	Votes	%
Democratic	Mark Hackel	174,245	65.82%
Republican	Randell J. Shafer	81,981	30.97%
Libertarian	Erin A. Stahl	8,490	3.21%
Total votes		264,716	100.00%
Democratic win (new seat)			
