= 2026 Madison County, Alabama, elections =

Local elections in Alabama

- November 3, 2026

A general election was held in Madison County, Alabama, on November 3, 2026, to elect various county officials. Primary elections were held on May 19.

== Sheriff ==
=== Republican primary ===
==== Candidates ====
===== Nominee =====
- Kevin Turner, incumbent sheriff

=== Democratic primary ===
==== Candidates ====
===== Nominee =====
- Brett Jones, law enforcement officer

=== General election ===
==== Endorsements ====
Brett Jones (D)

Organizations

- LGBTQ Victory Fund
- SPLC Action Fund

==== Results ====
2026 Madison County Sheriff election
Party	Candidate	Votes	%
Democratic	Brett Jones	84,068	52.93
Republican	Kevin Turner (incumbent)	74,639	46.99
Write-in		123	0.08
Total votes		158,830	100.00

== Schools Superintendent ==
=== Republican primary ===
==== Candidates ====
===== Nominee =====
- Keith Trawick, superintendent chief of staff

=== Democratic primary ===
==== Candidates ====
===== Nominee =====
- E. Quinn Headen, principal of Hazel Green High School

=== General election ===
==== Results ====
2026 Madison County Schools Superintendent election
Party	Candidate	Votes	%
Republican	Keith Trawick	30,266	52.66
Democratic	E. Quinn Headen	27,109	47.16
Write-in		104	0.18
Total votes		57,479	100.00

== Tax Collector ==
=== Republican primary ===
==== Candidates ====
===== Nominee =====
- Valerie D. Miles, incumbent tax collector

=== Democratic primary ===
==== Candidates ====
===== Nominee =====
- Jeff Taylor

=== General election ===
==== Results ====
2026 Madison County Tax Collector election
Party	Candidate	Votes	%
Democratic	Jeff Taylor	83,087	52.85
Republican	Valerie D. Miles (incumbent)	73,958	47.04
Write-in		168	0.11
Total votes		157,213	100.00

== Coroner ==
=== Republican primary ===
==== Candidates ====
===== Nominee =====
- Tyler Berryhill, incumbent coroner

=== General election ===
==== Results ====
2026 Madison County Coroner election
Party	Candidate	Votes	%
Republican	Tyler Berryhill (incumbent)	87,252	94.36
Write-in		5,213	5.64
Total votes		92,465	100.00

== License Director ==
=== Republican primary ===
==== Candidates ====
===== Nominee =====
- Mark Craig, incumbent license director

=== General election ===
==== Results ====
2026 Madison County License Director election
Party	Candidate	Votes	%
Republican	Mark Craig (incumbent)	89,017	94.52
Write-in		5,165	5.48
Total votes		94,182	100.00

== Tax Assessor ==
=== Republican primary ===
==== Candidates ====
===== Nominee =====
- Cliff Mann, incumbent tax assessor

=== General election ===
==== Results ====
2026 Madison County Tax Assessor election
Party	Candidate	Votes	%
Republican	Cliff Mann (incumbent)	85,256	93.88
Write-in		5,557	6.12
Total votes		90,813	100.00

== Circuit Court ==
=== Place 2 ===
==== Republican primary ====
===== Candidates =====
====== Nominee ======
- Alison Strickland Austin

==== General election ====
===== Results =====
2026 Madison County Circuit Court election, place 2
Party	Candidate	Votes	%
Republican	Alison Strickland Austin	84,152	93.49
Write-in		5,857	6.51
Total votes		90,009	100.00

=== Place 4 ===
==== Republican primary ====
===== Candidates =====
====== Nominee ======
- Claude E. Hundley III, incumbent judge

==== General election ====
===== Results =====
2026 Madison County Circuit Court election, place 4
Party	Candidate	Votes	%
Republican	Claude E. Hundley III (incumbent)	84,020	93.54
Write-in		5,806	6.46
Total votes		89,826	100.00

== District Court ==
=== Place 1 ===
==== Republican primary ====
===== Candidates =====
====== Nominee ======
- Tim Douthit, incumbent judge and former chief trial attorney for the district attorney's office (appointed in 2026)

====== Eliminated in primary ======
- Michael Tewalt

===== Results =====
Republican primary
Party	Candidate	Votes	%
Republican	Tim Douthit (incumbent)	18,096	65.27
Republican	Michael Tewalt	9,629	34.73
Total votes		27,725	100.00

==== Democratic primary ====
===== Candidates =====
====== Nominee ======
- Kimberly Kelley Rucker

===== Endorsements =====
Kimberly Kelley Rucker

Organizations

- Southern Poverty Law Center Action Fund

==== General election ====
===== Results =====
2026 Madison County District Court election, place 1
Party	Candidate	Votes	%
Democratic	Kimberly Kelley Rucker	84,619	53.74
Republican	Tim Douthit (incumbent)	72,726	46.19
Write-in		112	0.07
Total votes		157,457	100.00

=== Place 4 ===
==== Republican primary ====
===== Candidates =====
====== Nominee ======
- John R. Allen, incumbent judge

==== Democratic primary ====
===== Candidates =====
====== Nominee ======
- Jason M. Jones

===== Endorsements =====
Jason M. Jones

Organizations

- Southern Poverty Law Center Action Fund

==== General election ====
===== Results =====
2026 Madison County District Court election, place 4
Party	Candidate	Votes	%
Democratic	Jason M. Jones	84,554	53.76
Republican	John R. Allen (incumbent)	72,635	46.18
Write-in		95	0.06
Total votes		157,284	100.00

=== Place 5 ===
==== Republican primary ====
===== Candidates =====
====== Nominee ======
- Jeanne Rizzardi, assistant Huntsville city attorney

==== Democratic primary ====
===== Candidates =====
====== Nominee ======
- Raven Beach, attorney and municipal court judge

===== Endorsements =====
Raven Beach

Organizations

- Southern Poverty Law Center Action Fund

==== General election ====
===== Results =====
2026 Madison County District Court election, place 5
Party	Candidate	Votes	%
Democratic	Raven Beach	83,917	53.49
Republican	Jeanne Rizzardi	72,847	46.43
Write-in		125	0.08
Total votes		156,889	100.00

== School Board ==
=== District 3 ===
==== Republican primary ====
===== Candidates =====
====== Nominee ======
- Brian Brooks, incumbent board member

==== Democratic primary ====
===== Candidates =====
====== Nominee ======
- Austin Jones

=== General election ===
==== Results ====
2026 Madison County School Board election, district 3
Party	Candidate	Votes	%
Republican	Brian Brooks (incumbent)	6,010	70.42
Democratic	Austin Jones	2,507	29.38
Write-in		17	0.20
Total votes		8,534	100.00
