= 2026 Gwinnett County elections =

2026 Georgia local elections

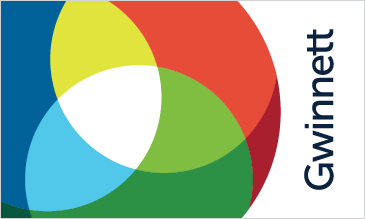
- November 3, 2026

A general election was held in Gwinnett County, Georgia, on November 3, 2026, to elect various county-level positions. Partisan primary elections were held on May 19, alongside nonpartisan judicial and school board elections in the county.

== Board of Commissioners ==
=== District 2 ===
==== Democratic primary ====
===== Candidates =====
====== Nominee ======
- Ben Ku, incumbent commissioner

===== Endorsements =====
Ben Ku

Organizations

- Run for Something

===== Results =====
Democratic primary
Party	Candidate	Votes	%
Democratic	Ben Ku (incumbent)	20,584	100.00
Total votes		20,584	100.00

==== Republican primary ====
===== Candidates =====
====== Nominee ======
- Rodolfo Ochoa, business owner

===== Results =====
Republican primary
Party	Candidate	Votes	%
Republican	Rodolfo Ochoa	6,202	100.00
Total votes		6,202	100.00

==== General election ====
===== Results =====
2026 Gwinnett County Board of Commissioners District 2 election
Party	Candidate	Votes	%
Democratic	Ben Ku (incumbent)	52,387	75.41
Republican	Rodolfo Ochoa	17,079	24.59
Total votes		69,466	100.00

=== District 4 ===
==== Republican primary ====
===== Candidates =====
====== Nominee ======
- Matthew Holtkamp, incumbent commissioner

====== Eliminated in primary ======
- Arfeen Chowdhury, chief executive officer

===== Results =====
Republican primary
Party	Candidate	Votes	%
Republican	Matthew Holtkamp (incumbent)	14,780	87.27
Republican	Arfeen Chowdhury	2,156	12.73
Total votes		17,026	100.00

==== Democratic primary ====
===== Candidates =====
====== Nominee ======
- Benjamin Culberson, college student

===== Endorsements =====
Benjamin Culberson

Organizations

- Georgia Conservation Voters

===== Results =====
Democratic primary
Party	Candidate	Votes	%
Democratic	Benjamin Culberson	18,321	100.00
Total votes		18,321	100.00

==== General election ====
===== Results =====
2026 Gwinnett County Board of Commissioners District 4 election
Party	Candidate	Votes	%
Democratic	Benjamin Culberson	52,614	55.18
Republican	Matthew Holtkamp (incumbent)	42,734	44.82
Total votes		95,348	100.00

== Solicitor General ==
=== Democratic primary ===
==== Candidates ====
===== Nominee =====
- Lisamarie Bristol, incumbent solicitor general

===== Eliminated in primary =====
- Joseph Morales, assistant district attorney

==== Results ====
Democratic primary
Party	Candidate	Votes	%
Democratic	Lisamarie Bristol (incumbent)	65,954	72.57
Democratic	Joseph Morales	24,933	27.43
Total votes		90,887	100.00

=== General election ===
==== Results ====
2026 Gwinnett Solicitor General election
Party	Candidate	Votes	%
Democratic	Lisamarie Bristol (incumbent)	280,450	100.00
Total votes		280,450	100.00

== Board of Education ==
=== District 2 ===
==== Candidates ====
===== Declared =====
- Chelsea Hutchings
- Steven Knudsen, incumbent board member

==== Results ====
General election
Candidate	Votes	%
Chelsea Hutchings	13,575	50.69
Steven Knudsen (incumbent)	13,208	49.31
Total votes	26,783	100.00

=== District 4 ===
==== Candidates ====
===== Declared =====
- Camille Christopher
- Adrienne Simmons, incumbent board member

==== Endorsements ====
Adrienne Simmons

Organizations

- Georgia Working Families Party

==== Results ====
General election
Candidate	Votes	%
Adrienne Simmons (incumbent)	18,891	61.40
Camille Christopher	12,507	38.60
Total votes	31,398	100.00

== State Court ==
=== Division 4 ===
==== Candidates ====
===== Declared =====
- Ronda Colvin, incumbent judge

==== Results ====
General election
Candidate	Votes	%
Ronda Colvin (incumbent)	130,039	100.00
Total votes	130,039	100.00

=== Division 4 ===
==== Candidates ====
===== Declared =====
- Erica Dove, incumbent judge

==== Results ====
General election
Candidate	Votes	%
Erica Dove (incumbent)	129,815	100.00
Total votes	129,815	100.00
