= 2026 Pensacola mayoral election =

Local election in Florida, U.S.

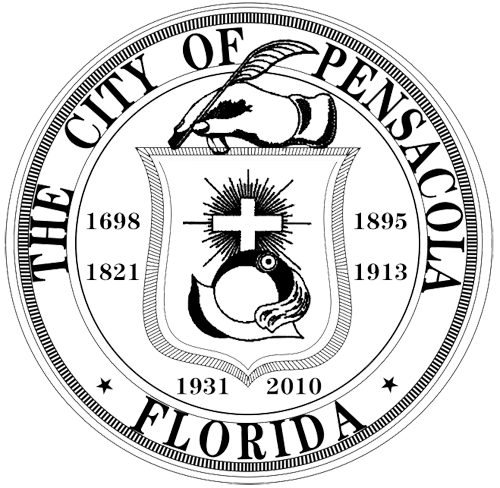
- August 18, 2026
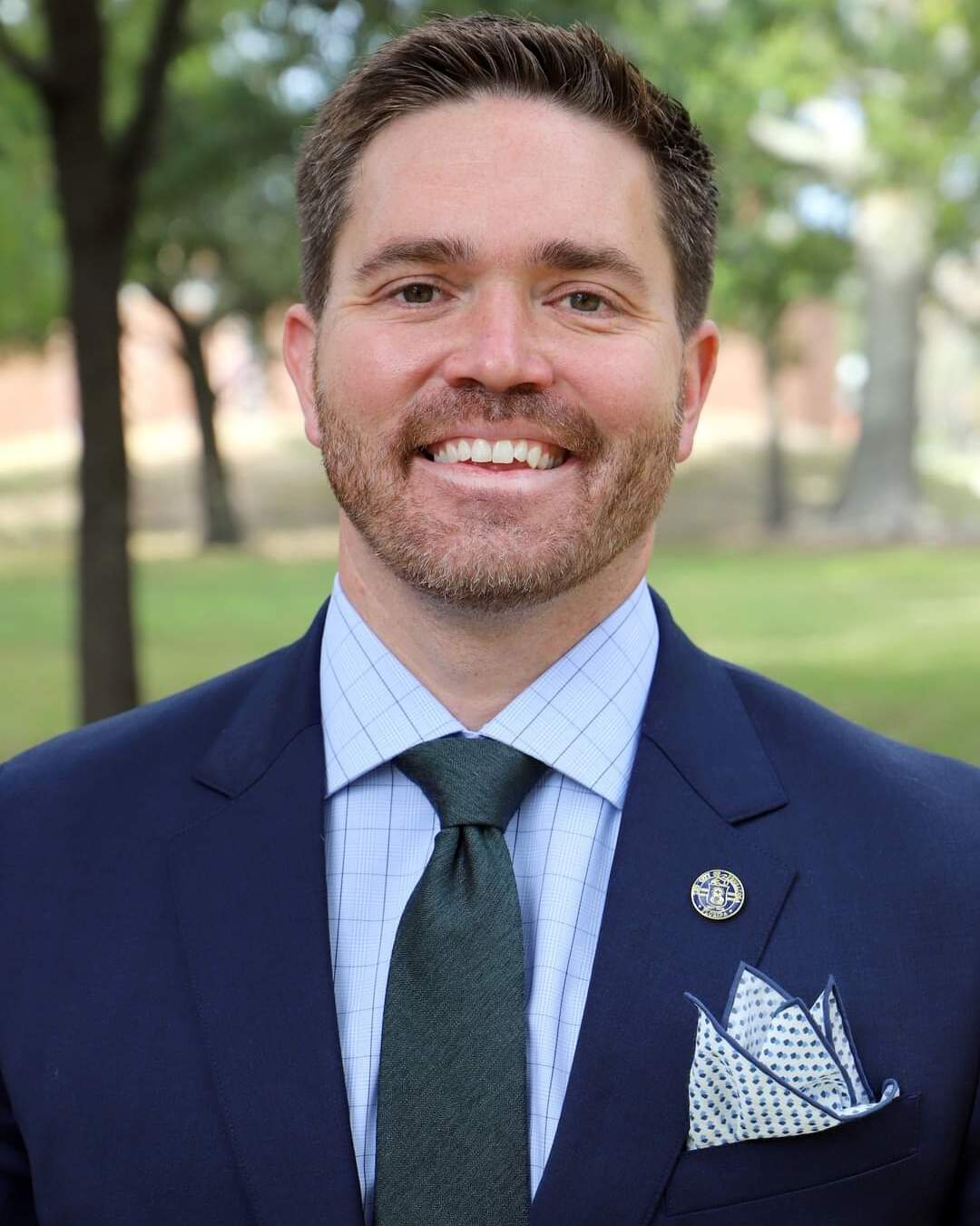

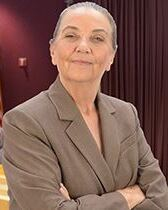
Candidate	D. C. Reeves	Alicia Trawick
Popular vote	7,483	2,976
Percentage	53.3%	21.2%
Candidate	Ann Hill	Jermaine Williams
Popular vote	1,445	1,130
Percentage	10.3%	8.0%
mayor before election
D. C. Reeves
Elected mayor
D. C. Reeves

The 2026 Pensacola mayoral election was held on August 18, 2026, to elect the mayor of Pensacola, Florida. The election is officially nonpartisan. Incumbent D. C. Reeves was re-elected to a second consecutive term. He became the first mayor in city history to win consecutive elections by a majority in the primary election, avoiding a runoff both times.

== Candidates ==
=== Declared ===
- Jasmine Brown, community organizer and housing advocate
- Ann Hill, former city council president (2018–2022)
- D. C. Reeves, incumbent mayor
- Eric Shorter, businessman
- Alicia Trawick, local government consultant
- Jermaine Williams, behavioral health professional and filmmaker

== Results ==
2026 Pensacola Mayoral Election
Candidate	Votes	%
D. C. Reeves (incumbent)	7,483	53.27
Alicia Trawick	2,976	21.19
Ann Hill	1,445	10.29
Jermaine Williams	1,130	8.04
Jasmine Brown	569	4.05
Eric Shorter	444	3.16
Total votes	14,047	100.00
