= 2026 Collin County Judge election =

Local election in Texas

- November 3, 2026
Candidate	Chris Hill	John Brown
Party	Republican	Democratic
Popular vote	217,401	215,538
Percentage	50.22%	49.78%
County Judge before election
Chris Hill
Republican
Elected County Judge
Chris Hill
Republican

The 2026 Collin County Judge election was held on November 3, 2026, to elect the county judge of Collin County, Texas. Primary elections were held on March 3. Incumbent Republican county judge Chris Hill ran for re-election.

== Republican primary ==
=== Candidates ===
==== Nominee ====
- Chris Hill, incumbent county judge

==== Eliminated in primary ====
- Rick Grady, former member of the Plano city council

=== Endorsements ===
Rick Grady

Newspapers

- The Dallas Morning News

=== Results ===
Republican primary
Party	Candidate	Votes	%
Republican	Chris Hill (incumbent)	67,406	78.30
Republican	Rick Grady	18,679	21.70
Total votes		86,085	100.00

== Democratic primary ==
=== Candidates ===
==== Nominee ====
- John Brown

=== Results ===
Democratic primary
Party	Candidate	Votes	%
Democratic	John Brown	71,674	100.00
Total votes		71,674	100.00
