= 2026 Mobile County elections =

Local elections in Alabama

- November 3, 2026

A general election will be held in Mobile County, Alabama, United States, on November 3, 2026, to elect various county-level positions. Primary elections were held on May 19.

== Sheriff ==
=== Republican primary ===
==== Candidates ====
===== Nominee =====
- Paul Burch, incumbent sheriff

===== Eliminated in primary =====
- Paul Prine, former Mobile police chief and candidate for mayor of Mobile in 2025

==== Results ====
Republican primary
Party	Candidate	Votes	%
Republican	Paul Burch (incumbent)	22,675	71.95
Republican	Paul Prine	8,842	28.05
Total votes		31,517	100.00

=== Democratic primary ===
==== Candidates ====
===== Nominee =====
- Pamela Laffitte, retired police sergeant and nominee for secretary of state in 2022

=== General election ===
==== Endorsements ====
Pamela Laffitte (D)

Organizations

- SPLC Action Fund

==== Results ====
2026 Mobile County Sheriff election
Party	Candidate	Votes	%
Republican	Paul Burch (incumbent)		
Democratic	Pamela J. Laffitte		
Write-in			
Total votes			100.00

== Revenue Commissioner ==
=== Republican primary ===
==== Candidates ====
===== Nominee =====
- Kim Hastie, incumbent revenue commissioner

=== General election ===
==== Results ====
2026 Mobile County Revenue Commissioner election
Party	Candidate	Votes	%
Republican	Kim Hastie (incumbent)		
Write-in			
Total votes			100.00

== District Court ==
=== Place 3 ===
==== Republican primary ====
===== Candidates =====
====== Nominee ======
- C. Zackery Moore, incumbent judge

==== General election ====
===== Results =====
2026 Mobile County District Court election, place 3
Party	Candidate	Votes	%
Republican	C. Zackery Moore (incumbent)		
Write-in			
Total votes			100.00

== Board of Education ==
=== District 3 ===
==== Democratic primary ====
===== Candidates =====
====== Nominee ======
- Reginald Crenshaw, incumbent board member

==== General election ====
===== Results =====
2026 Mobile County Board of Education election, district 3
Party	Candidate	Votes	%
Democratic	Reginald Crenshaw (incumbent)		
Independent	Meika Gordon Gardner		
Write-in			
Total votes			100.00

=== District 4 ===
==== Republican primary ====
===== Candidates =====
====== Nominee ======
- Mike Fasano

==== Democratic primary ====
===== Candidates =====
====== Nominee ======
- Sherry Dillihay-McDade

==== General election ====
===== Results =====
2026 Shelby County Board of Education election, district 4
Party	Candidate	Votes	%
Republican	Mike Fasano		
Democratic	Sherry Dillihay-McDade		
Write-in			
Total votes			100.00
