= 2026 North Las Vegas mayoral election =

- November 3, 2026 (runoff)
Candidate	Daniele Monroe-Moreno	Scott Black
Popular vote	42,278	29,946
Percentage	58.54%	41.46%
Mayor before election
Pamela Goynes-Brown
Elected mayor
Daniele Monroe-Moreno

The 2026 North Las Vegas mayoral election was held on November 3, 2026 to elect the mayor of North Las Vegas. A nonpartisan top-two primary was held on June 9, 2026. Incumbent mayor Pamela Goynes-Brown is ineligible to run for re-election. Election was won by speaker pro tempore of the Nevada Assembly, Daniele Monroe-Moreno.

== Candidates ==
=== Declared ===
- Scott Black, city councilmember from the 3rd ward (2017–present)
- Gary Bouchard
- Zaire Langdon
- Daniele Monroe-Moreno, speaker pro tempore of the Nevada Assembly from the 1st district (2016–present)
- Henry Thorns

== Primary election ==
=== Endorsements ===
Scott Black

Local officials

- Pamela Goynes-Brown, mayor of North Las Vegas (2022–present)
- Ruth Garcia-Anderson, city councilmember from the 2nd ward (2022–present)
Daniele Monroe-Moreno

Organizations

- Democratic Mayors Association
- EMILYs List

=== Results ===
2026 North Las Vegas mayoral primary election
Candidate	Votes	%
Daniele Monroe-Moreno	13,809	47.06
Scott Black	12,198	41.57
Henry Thorns	1,405	4.79
Zaire Langdon	1,007	3.43
Gary Bouchard	925	3.15
Total votes	29,344	100.0

== General election ==
=== Results ===
2026 North Las Vegas mayoral election
Candidate	Votes	%
Daniele Monroe-Moreno	42,278	58.54
Scott Black	29,946	41.46
Total votes	72,224	100.0
