= 2026 Salt Lake County elections =

Local elections in Utah, US

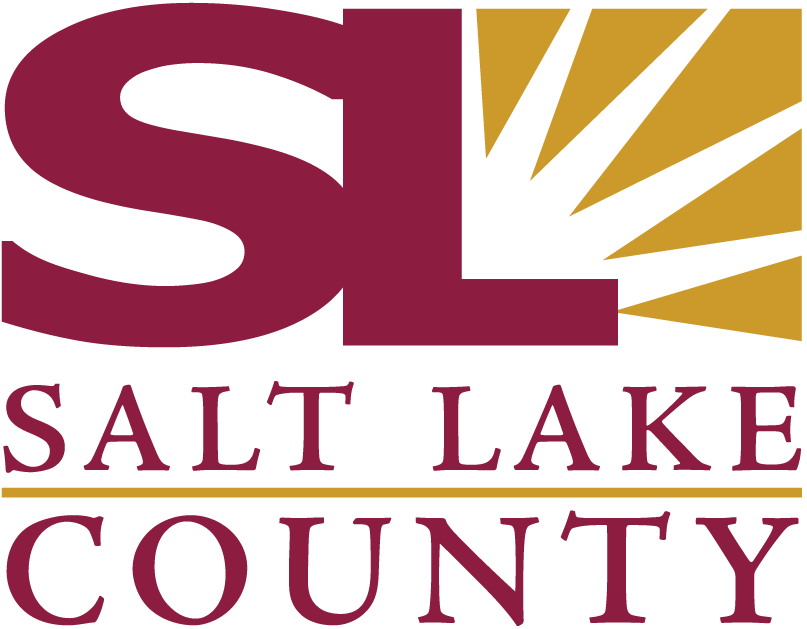
- November 3, 2026

A general election was held in Salt Lake County, Utah, on November 3, 2026, to elect various county-level positions. Primary elections were held on June 23.

== County Council ==
Four of eight seats on the Salt Lake County Council are up for election.

== County Auditor ==
=== Republican primary ===
==== Candidates ====
===== Nominee =====
- Chris Harding, incumbent county auditor

=== Democratic primary ===
==== Candidates ====
===== Nominee =====
- Ali Cloward

=== General election ===
==== Results ====
2026 Salt Lake County Auditor election
Party	Candidate	Votes	%
Democratic	Ali Cloward	225,441	61.05
Republican	Chris Harding (incumbent)	143,817	38.95
Total votes		369,258	100.00

== County Clerk ==
=== Democratic primary ===
==== Candidates ====
===== Nominee =====
- Lannie Chapman, incumbent county clerk

=== General election ===
==== Results ====
2026 Salt Lake County Clerk election
Party	Candidate	Votes	%
Democratic	Lannie Chapman (incumbent)	289,796	100.00
Total votes		289,796	100.00

== County District Attorney ==
=== Democratic primary ===
==== Candidates ====
===== Nominee =====
- Sim Gill, incumbent county district attorney

===== Eliminated in primary =====
- Shawn Robinson, assistant district attorney

==== Results ====
Democratic primary
Party	Candidate	Votes	%
Democratic	Sim Gill (incumbent)	34,080	51.80
Democratic	Shawn Robinson	31,713	48.20
Total votes		65,793	100.00

=== Republican primary ===
==== Candidates ====
===== Nominee =====
- Kent Davis, attorney

=== General election ===
==== Results ====
2026 Salt Lake County District Attorney election
Party	Candidate	Votes	%
Democratic	Sim Gill (incumbent)	236,488	63.75
Republican	Kent Davis	134,491	36.25
Total votes		370,979	100.00

== County Sheriff ==
=== Democratic primary ===
==== Candidates ====
===== Nominee =====
- Rosie Rivera, incumbent county sheriff

=== Republican primary ===
==== Candidates ====
===== Nominee =====
- Shane Manwaring

===== Eliminated at convention =====
- Nicholas Roberts, nominee in 2022

=== General election ===
==== Results ====
2026 Salt Lake County Sheriff election
Party	Candidate	Votes	%
Democratic	Rosie Rivera (incumbent)	252,397	68.01
Republican	Shane Manwaring	118,710	31.99
Total votes		371,107	100.00
