= 2026 local electoral calendar =

Worldwide local elections held in 2026

This local electoral calendar for 2026 lists the subnational elections held, and scheduled to be held, in 2026. Referendums, recall and retention elections, and national by-elections (special elections) are also included. Specific dates are given where these are known.

== January ==
- 6 January: United States
  - Connecticut, 25th House of Representatives district, special election
  - Georgia, 23rd House of Representatives district, special election (2nd round)
  - South Carolina, 98th House of Representatives district, special election
  - Virginia
    - 77th House of Delegates district, special election
    - 15th Senate district, special election
- 12 January: Trinidad and Tobago, Tobago, House of Assembly
- 13 January: United States
  - Alabama, 63rd House of Representatives district, special election
  - Connecticut, 139th House of Representatives district, special election
  - Virginia
    - 11th House of Delegates district, special election
    - 23rd House of Delegates district, special election
- 15 January:
  - India, off-year elections, Maharashtra, local elections, Brihanmumbai, Municipal Corporation
  - Zambia, Chawama, National Assembly by-election
- 18 January: France, Loiret's 1st constituency, National Assembly by-election (1st round)
- 20 January: United States
  - Georgia, 18th Senate district, special election (1st round)
  - Virginia, 17th House of Delegates district, special election
- 24 January: Malaysia
  - Kinabatangan, House of Representatives by-election
  - Sabah, Lamag, Legislative Assembly by-election
- 25 January:
  - France
    - Loiret's 1st constituency, National Assembly by-election (2nd round)
    - Haute-Savoie's 3rd constituency, National Assembly by-election (1st round)
  - Japan, Fukui Prefecture, Governor
- 27 January: United States, Minnesota
  - House of Representatives district 47A, special election
  - House of Representatives district 64A, special election
- 31 January: United States, Texas
  - 18th congressional district, special election (2nd round)
  - 9th Senate district, special election (2nd round)

== February ==
- 1 February: France, Haute-Savoie's 3rd constituency, National Assembly by-election (2nd round)
- 3 February: United States
  - Alabama, 38th House of Representatives district, special election
  - New York
    - 36th State Assembly district, special election
    - 74th State Assembly district, special election
    - 47th Senate district, special election
    - 61st Senate district, special election
- 7 February: United States, Louisiana
  - 3rd Senate district, special election (1st round)
  - 37th House of Representatives district, special election
  - 60th House of Representatives district, special election
  - 97th House of Representatives district, special election
  - 100th House of Representatives district, special election (1st round)
- 8 February:
  - Japan
    - Nagasaki Prefecture, Governor
    - Osaka, Mayor
    - Osaka Prefecture, Governor
    - Yamaguchi Prefecture, Governor
  - Spain, Aragon, Cortes
- 10 February: United States
  - Oklahoma
    - 35th House of Representatives district, special election
    - Oklahoma City, Mayor
  - Virginia
    - 39th Senate district, special election
    - 5th House of Delegates district, special election
- 17 February: United States, Georgia, 18th Senate district, special election (2nd round)
- 23 February: Canada, Quebec, Chicoutimi, by-election
- 24 February: United States
  - Maine, 94th House of Representatives district, special election
  - Pennsylvania
    - 22nd House of Representatives district, special election
    - 42nd House of Representatives district, special election
- 26 February: United Kingdom, Gorton and Denton, House of Commons by-election
- 27 February: Samoa
  - Safata 1, Legislative Assembly by-election
  - Vaisigano 2, Legislative Assembly by-election

== March ==
- 3 March: United States
  - Arkansas
    - 26th Senate district, special election
    - 70th House of Representatives district, special election
  - Massachusetts, Senate's 1st Middlesex district, special election
- 7 March: Australia, Northern Territory, Nightcliff by-election
- 8 March:
  - Germany
    - Bavaria, local elections
    - Baden-Württemberg, Landtag
  - Japan, Ishikawa Prefecture, Governor
  - Switzerland
    - Nidwalden, Landrat [de]
    - Obwalden, Kantonsrat [de]
- 10 March: United States
  - Georgia
    - 14th congressional district, special election (1st round)
    - 53rd Senate district, special election (1st round)
    - 94th House of Representatives district, special election (1st round)
    - 130th House of Representatives district, special election (1st round)
  - New Hampshire, House of Representatives Carroll 7 district, special election
- 11 March:
  - India, Goa, Panaji, Municipal Corporation
- 14 March:
  - Philippines, Antipolo, 2nd congressional district, special election
  - United States, Louisiana
    - 3rd Senate district, special election (2nd round)
    - 69th House of Representatives district, special election
    - 100th House of Representatives district, special election (2nd round)
- 15 March:
  - France
    - Municipal Councils (1st round)
    - Metropolis of Lyon, Metropolitan Council (1st round)
    - Lyon, Municipal Council (1st round)
    - Marseille, Municipal Council (1st round)
    - Nice, Municipal Council (1st round)
    - Paris, Council (1st round)
    - Toulouse, Municipal Council (1st round)
  - Germany, Hesse, local elections [de]
  - Spain, Castile and León, Cortes
- 16 March: Antigua and Barbuda, St. Philip's North, House of Representatives by-election
- 17 March: United States
  - Pennsylvania
    - 79th House of Representatives district, special election
    - 193rd House of Representatives district, special election
  - Virginia, 98th House of Delegates district, special election
- 18 March: Netherlands, municipal elections
  - The Hague, municipal election
- 21 March: Australia, South Australia, House of Assembly and Legislative Council, First Nations Voice
- 22 March:
  - Bolivia, regional elections (1st round) [es]
  - France
    - Municipal Councils (2nd round)
    - Metropolis of Lyon, Metropolitan Council (2nd round)
    - Lyon, Municipal Council (2nd round)
    - Marseille, Municipal Council (2nd round)
    - Nice, Municipal Council (2nd round)
    - Paris, Council (2nd round)
    - Toulouse, Municipal Council (2nd round)
  - Germany, Rhineland-Palatinate, Landtag
- 22–23 March: Italy
  - Rovigo, by-election
  - Selvazzano Dentro, by-election
- 24 March: United States, Florida
  - 14th Senate district, special election
  - 51st House of Representatives district, special election
  - 87th House of Representatives district, special election
- 29 March:
  - Serbia, local elections
  - Switzerland, Bern, Grosser Rat [de]
- 31 March: United States, Massachusetts, House of Representatives 5th Essex District, special election

== April ==
- 4 April: Maldives, 5th Local Island Election and 2nd Women’s Development Committee’s Election
- 5 April: Japan, Kyoto Prefecture, Governor
- 7 April: United States
  - Alaska, Anchorage, municipal elections
  - Georgia
    - 14th congressional district, special election (2nd round)
    - 53rd Senate district, special election (2nd round)
    - 94th House of Representatives district, special election (2nd round)
    - 130th House of Representatives district, special election (2nd round)
  - Wisconsin
    - Supreme Court
    - Waukesha, Mayor
- 9 April:
  - India
    - Assam, Legislative Assembly
    - Kerala, Legislative Assembly
    - Puducherry, Legislative Assembly
  - New Zealand, Ōtara-Papatoetoe, by-election
- 11 April, Philippines, San Isidro, Davao del Norte, renaming plebiscite
- 13 April: Canada
  - Scarborough Southwest: federal by-election
  - Terrebonne: federal by-election
  - University—Rosedale: federal by-election
- 16 April: United States, New Jersey, 11th congressional district, special election
- 19 April: Bolivia, regional elections (2nd round) [es]
- 21 April: United States, Virginia, referendum
- 23 April: India, Tamil Nadu, Legislative Assembly
- 25 April: Palestine, local elections
- 26 April: India, Gujarat, local elections
- 23–29 April: India, West Bengal, Legislative Assembly

== May ==
- 1 May: Samoa, Vaimauga 3, Legislative Assembly by-election
- 2 May:
  - Australia
    - Tasmania, Legislative Council
    - Victoria, Nepean, Legislative Assembly by-election
  - United States
    - Texas
      - 4th Senate district, special election
      - Arlington, Mayor
      - Irving, Mayor
      - Lubbock, Mayor
- 5 May: United States, Michigan, 35th Senate district, special election
- 7 May: United Kingdom, local elections
  - Scotland, Parliament
  - Wales, Senedd
- 9 May: Australia, Farrer, House of Representatives by-election
- 10 May: India, Haryana, Municipal Corporation
- 11 May: Canada, New Brunswick, municipal elections
- 12 May:
  - New Zealand, Dunedin, City Council by-election
  - United States
    - Georgia, 177th House of Representatives district, special election (1st round)
    - New Jersey, Newark, Mayor
    - West Virginia, Supreme Court of Appeals
- 16 May:
  - Australia, Queensland, Stafford by-election
  - Iceland, municipal elections
    - Reykjavík, City Council
  - United States, Louisiana, amendments
- 17 May:
  - Spain, Andalusia, Parliament
  - India, Himachal Pradesh, local elections
- 19 May: United States
  - Alabama, amendments
  - Georgia
    - 7th Senate district, special election (1st round)
    - Court of Appeals
    - Supreme Court
  - Oregon
    - Referendum
    - Commissioner of Labor
  - Pennsylvania, 196th House of Representatives district, special election
- 22 May: Ireland
  - Dublin Central, Dáil by-election
  - Galway West, Dáil by-election
- 22–31 May: France, Assembly of French Citizens Abroad
- 24–25 May: Italy, local elections (1st round)
- 26 May: Punjab, India, local elections
- 31 May:
  - Germany, Hamburg, Olympics referendum
  - Japan, Niigata Prefecture, Governor

== June ==
- 2 June: United States
  - California
    - California, 1st congressional district, special election
    - Long Beach, Mayor
    - Los Angeles, Mayor (1st round), City Attorney (1st round), City Controller, and City Council (1st round)
    - Los Angeles County, Board of Supervisors, Sheriff (1st round), and Assessor
  - South Dakota, Sioux Falls, Mayor (1st round)
- 3 June: South Korea
  - Local elections
  - National Assembly, 14 by-elections
- 7 June:
  - Mexico, Coahuila, Congress
  - Pakistan, Gilgit-Baltistan, Assembly
- 7–8 June: Italy, local elections (2nd round)
- 9 June:
  - India, Uttarakhand, local elections
  - United States
    - Georgia, 177th House of Representatives district, special election (2nd round)
    - Maine, 29th House of Representatives district, special election
    - Nevada
      - Henderson, Mayor (1st round)
      - North Las Vegas, Mayor (1st round)
    - North Dakota, amendment
- 14 June: Switzerland
  - Glarus, Landrat [de]
  - Grisons, Grosser Rat [de]
- 16 June: United States
  - California, 14th congressional district, special election (1st round)
  - District of Columbia, at-large, special election
  - Georgia, 7th Senate district, special election (2nd round)
  - Oklahoma, ballot measure
- 18 June:
  - Nigeria, Ekiti State, Governor
  - United Kingdom
    - Aberdeen South, House of Commons by-election
    - Arbroath and Broughty Ferry, House of Commons by-election
    - Makerfield, House of Commons by-election
- 19 June: Brazil, Roraima, Governor special election
- 23 June:
  - Canada, Nova Scotia, Chéticamp-Margarees-Pleasant Bay, by-election
  - United States, South Dakota, Sioux Falls, Mayor (2nd round)
- 28 June:
  - Austria, Graz, Gemeinderat
  - Thailand, Bangkok, Governor, Metropolitan Council

== July ==
- 5 July: Japan, Shiga Prefecture, Governor
- 10 July: Samoa, Safata 2, Legislative Assembly by-election
- 11 July: Malaysia, Johor, State Legislative Assembly
- 13 July: Canada, Prince Edward Island, Cornwall-Meadowbank, by-election
- 16 July: United Kingdom, Norfolk, police and crime commissioner by-election
- 21 July:
  - Canada, Manitoba, The Pas-Kameesak, by-election
  - United States, Arizona, Chandler, Mayor
- 27 July: Pakistan, Azad Kashmir, Legislative Assembly (first phase)
- 28 July: United States, Georgia, Georgia's 13th congressional district, special election (1st round)
- 30 July: United Kingdom, Greater Manchester, mayoral by-election

== August ==
- 1 August: Malaysia, Negeri Sembilan, State Legislative Assembly
- 2 August: Pakistan, Azad Kashmir, Legislative Assembly (second phase)
- 4 August: United States
  - Arkansas, 44th House of Representatives district, special election
  - Kansas, amendment
  - Michigan, Flint, Mayor (1st round)
  - Missouri, amendments
- 6 August: United States, Tennessee
  - Supreme Court, retention elections
  - Knox County, Mayor
  - Shelby County, Mayor
- 9 August: Japan, Nagano Prefecture, Governor
- 10 August: Pakistan, Azad Kashmir, Legislative Assembly (third phase)
- 13 August: United Kingdom, Clacton, House of Commons by-election
- 15 August: Nigeria, Osun State, Governor
- 18 August: United States
  - Alaska, ballot measure
  - California, 14th congressional district, special election (2nd round)
  - Florida
    - St. Petersburg, Mayor (1st round)
    - Tallahassee, Mayor (1st round)
  - Pennsylvania, 12th House of Representatives district, special election
- 21 August: New Zealand, Greater Wellington, Wairarapa, by-election
- 25 August: United States,
  - Georgia, Georgia's 13th congressional district, special election (2nd round)
  - Oklahoma, ballot measures
- 29 August:
  - Philippines, Cavite, 4th congressional district, special election
  - Australia, Western Australia, Secret Harbour by-election
- 30 August: Japan, Kagawa Prefecture, Governor
- 31 August: Canada
  - Beaches—East York, by-election
  - Chicoutimi—Le Fjord, by-election
  - North Vancouver—Capilano, by-election

== September ==
- 3 September: Canada, Ontario
  - Hamilton East—Stoney Creek, by-election
  - York—Simcoe, by-election
  - Scarborough Southwest, by-election
- 6 September: Germany, Saxony-Anhalt, Landtag
- 12 September: Australia, Northern Territory, Mulka, by-election
- 13 September:
  - Germany, Lower Saxony, local elections
  - Sweden, regional and municipal elections
  - Japan, Okinawa Prefecture, Governor
- 14 September:
  - Philippines, Bangsamoro Parliament
  - Canada, Alberta, Calgary-Shaw, by-election
- 18 September: Samoa
  - Falealili 1, Legislative Assembly by-election
  - Vaimauga 3, Legislative Assembly by-election
- 20 September:
  - Germany
    - Berlin, Abgeordnetenhaus and Bezirksverordnetenversammlungen
    - Mecklenburg-Vorpommern, Landtag
  - Russia, regional elections
- 27 September: Poland, Kraków, mayoral by-election (1st round)
- 27–28 September: Italy, Reggio Calabria, by-election

== October ==
- 4 October:
  - Brazil, Governors (1st round)
    - Acre, Governor (1st round)
    - Alagoas, Governor
    - Amapá, Governor
    - Amazonas, Governor (1st round)
    - Bahia, Governor
    - Ceará, Governor
    - Espírito Santo, Governor (1st round)
    - Federal District, Governor (1st round)
    - Goiás, Governor
    - Maranhão, Governor
    - Mato Grosso, Governor
    - Mato Grosso do Sul, Governor
    - Minas Gerais, Governor
    - Pará, Governor
    - Paraíba, Governor
    - Paraná, Governor
    - Pernambuco, Governor
    - Piauí, Governor
    - Rio de Janeiro, Governor
    - Rio Grande do Norte, Governor (1st round)
    - Rio Grande do Sul, Governor
    - Rondônia, Governor
    - Roraima, Governor
    - Santa Catarina, Governor
    - São Paulo, Governor
    - Sergipe, Governor
    - Tocantins, Governor (1st round)
  - Bosnia and Herzegovina
    - Federation of Bosnia and Herzegovina, entity parliament and canton assemblies
    - Republika Srpska, entity president and parliament
  - Paraguay, municipal elections [es]
  - Peru, regional and municipal elections [es]
    - Lima, Mayor
  - Switzerland
    - Zug, Kantonsrat [de]
- 5 October: Canada, Quebec, National Assembly
- 8 October:
  - Tonga
    - Niua 17, Legislative Assembly by-election
    - Tongatapu 2, Legislative Assembly by-election
  - United Kingdom, Holborn and St Pancras, House of Commons by-election
- 9–10 October: Czech Republic, municipal elections
- 11 October: Poland, Kraków, mayoral election (2nd round)
- 17 October: Canada, British Columbia, municipal elections
  - Surrey, municipal elections
  - Vancouver, municipal elections
- 19 October: Canada, Alberta, Referendums
- 24 October:
  - Canada, British Columbia, Legislative Assembly
  - Slovakia, regional and local elections
- 25 October:
  - Brazil, Governors (2nd round)
    - Acre, Governor (2nd round)
    - Amazonas, Governor (2nd round)
    - Espírito Santo, Governor (2nd round)
    - Federal District, Governor (2nd round)
    - Rio Grande do Norte, Governor (2nd round)
    - Tocantins, Governor (2nd round)
  - Japan, Fukushima, Governor
- 26 October: Canada, Ontario, municipal elections
  - Hamilton, municipal elections
  - Ottawa, municipal elections
  - York Region municipal elections
  - Toronto, municipal elections
- 5–27 October: Australia, Tasmania, local elections
- 28 October: Canada, Manitoba, municipal elections

== November ==
- 2 November: Canada, Prince Edward Island, municipal elections
- 3 November: United States, midterm elections
  - Alabama, Governor, Lieutenant Governor, Secretary of State, Attorney General, ballot measures, and local elections
  - Alaska, Governor and Lieutenant Governor
  - American Samoa, House of Representatives
  - Arizona, Governor, Lieutenant Governor, Secretary of State, and Attorney General
  - Arkansas, Governor, Lieutenant Governor, Secretary of State, and Attorney General
  - California
    - Governor, Lieutenant Governor, Secretary of State, and Attorney General
    - Anaheim, Mayor
    - Chula Vista, Mayor
    - Irvine, Mayor
    - Los Angeles, Mayor (2nd round)
    - Oakland, Mayor
    - Santa Ana, Mayor
  - Colorado, Governor, Lieutenant Governor, Secretary of State, and Attorney General
  - Connecticut, Governor, Lieutenant Governor, Secretary of the State, Attorney General, Comptroller, and Treasurer
  - District of Columbia, Mayor and Attorney General
  - Florida
    - Governor, Lieutenant Governor, and Attorney General
    - St. Petersburg, Mayor (2nd round)
    - Tallahassee, Mayor (2nd round)
  - Georgia, Governor, Lieutenant Governor, Secretary of State, and Attorney General
  - Guam, Governor and Legislature
  - Hawaii, Governor and Lieutenant Governor
  - Idaho, Governor and Lieutenant Governor
  - Illinois, Governor, Lieutenant Governor, Secretary of State, and Attorney General
  - Indiana, Secretary of State
  - Iowa, Governor, Lieutenant Governor, Secretary of State, and Attorney General
  - Kansas, Governor, Lieutenant Governor, Secretary of State, Attorney General, and ballot measure
  - Kentucky
    - Lexington, Mayor
    - Louisville, Mayor
  - Maine, Governor
  - Maryland, Governor, Lieutenant Governor, and Attorney General
  - Massachusetts, Governor, Lieutenant Governor, Secretary of the Commonwealth, and Attorney General
  - Michigan, Governor, Lieutenant Governor, Secretary of State, and Attorney General
  - Minnesota
    - Governor, Lieutenant Governor, Secretary of State, and Attorney General
    - Hennepin County, County Attorney
  - Nebraska, Governor and Lieutenant Governor
  - Nevada
    - Governor, Lieutenant Governor, Secretary of State, and Attorney General
    - Henderson, Mayor (2nd round)
    - North Las Vegas, Mayor (2nd round)
    - Reno, Mayor
  - New Hampshire, Governor
  - New Mexico, Governor, Lieutenant Governor, and Secretary of State
  - New York, Governor, Lieutenant Governor, and Attorney General
  - North Carolina, Raleigh, Mayor
  - Northern Mariana Islands, Governor, Senate and House of Representatives
  - Ohio, Governor, Lieutenant Governor, Secretary of State, and Attorney General
  - Oklahoma, Governor, Lieutenant Governor, and Attorney General
  - Oregon, Governor
  - Pennsylvania, Governor and Lieutenant Governor
  - Rhode Island, Governor, Lieutenant Governor, and Attorney General
  - South Carolina, Governor, Lieutenant Governor, and Attorney General
  - South Dakota, Governor, Lieutenant Governor, Secretary of State, Attorney General, and ballot measure
  - Tennessee, Governor and county elections
  - Texas
    - Governor, Lieutenant Governor, and Attorney General
    - Corpus Christi, Mayor
    - Laredo, Mayor
  - United States Virgin Islands, Governor and Legislature
  - Vermont, Governor, Lieutenant Governor, and ballot measure
  - Virginia, ballot measures
  - Wisconsin, Governor, Lieutenant Governor, Secretary of State, and Attorney General
  - Wyoming, Governor and local elections
- 4 November: South Africa, municipal elections
- 6 November: Ireland, Seanad by-election
- 8 November: Lithuania, Northern Nalšia, Seimas by-election (1st round)
- 9 November: Canada, Saskatchewan, municipal elections
- 14 November: Malaysia, Malacca, State Legislative Assembly
- 15 November:
  - Moldova, Gagauzia, general election (1st round)
  - Slovenia, local elections [sl]
  - Japan, Ehime Prefecture, Governor
- 15–16 November: Italy, Chieti, by-election
- 22 November:
  - Lithuania, Northern Nalšia, Seimas by-election (2nd round)
  - Poland, Senate Constituency no. 20 by-election
  - Philippines, Naga, Camarines Sur, city conversion
- 28 November:
  - Australia, Victoria, Legislative Assembly
  - Philippines, Batanes, at-large congressional district, special election
  - Taiwan, local elections
- 29 November: Moldova, Gagauzia, general election (2nd round)

== December ==
- 7 December: Canada
  - Saint-Hyacinthe—Bagot—Acton: federal by-election
  - Scarborough North: federal by-election
  - Rosemont—La Petite-Patrie: federal by-election
  - Laurier—Sainte-Marie: federal by-election
  - Yorkton—Melville: federal by-election
  - Brantford—Brant South: federal by-election
- 12 December:
  - Malaysia, Sarawak, State Legislative Assembly
  - United States, Louisiana, general elections (2nd round)
    - Louisiana's 5th congressional district, general election (2nd round)
    - Louisiana's 6th congressional district, general election (2nd round)
    - Shreveport, Mayor (2nd round)
- 14 December: Canada, Northwest Territories, municipal elections
- 20 December: Japan, Saga Prefecture, Governor
- 27 December: Japan, Miyazaki Prefecture, Governor

== Unknown date ==
- India, West Bengal, Kolkata, Municipal Corporation

== See also ==
- 2026 Canadian electoral calendar
- 2026 elections in the European Union
- 2026 Japanese local elections
- 2026 New Zealand electoral calendar
- 2026 United States electoral calendar
- 2026 United Kingdom electoral calendar
