= 2026 New Zealand National Party leadership election =

The 2026 New Zealand National Party leadership election may refer to two New Zealand National Party leadership elections held in 2026:

- April 2026 New Zealand National Party leadership election
- August 2026 New Zealand National Party leadership election
