= 2026 Metropolitan Council of Lyon election =

Local government election

2026 Lyon Metropolis council election
- 15 March 2026 (first round); 22 March 2026 (second round)

All 150 members of the Metropolitan Council 76 seats needed for a majority

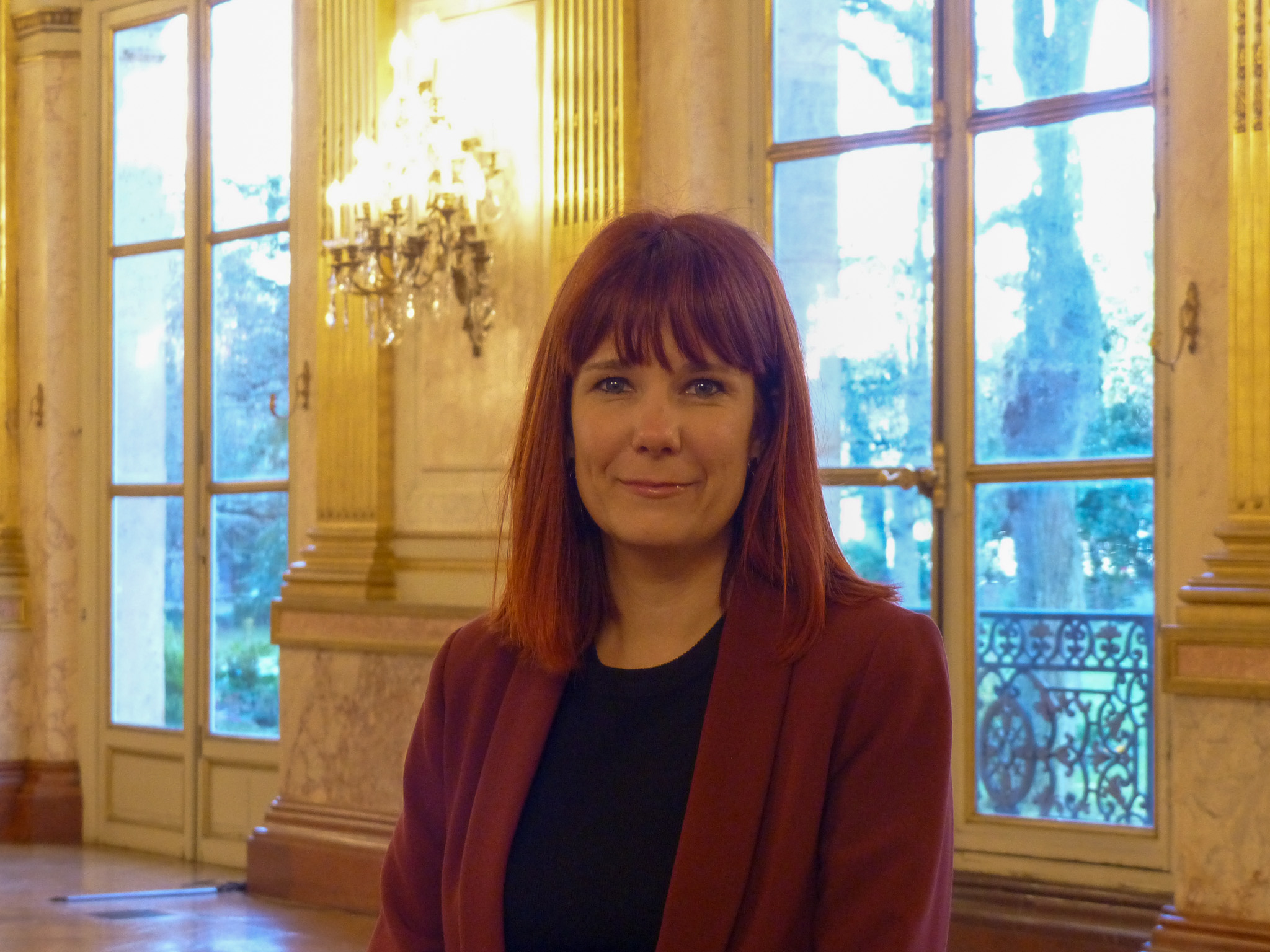
	First party	Second party	Third party
Candidate	Bruno Bernard	Véronique Sarselli	Tiffany Joncour
Party	LÉ–EELV	LR	RN
Last election	84	43	0
President of the Metropolis before election
Bruno Bernard
LÉ–EELV
Elected President of the Metropolis
TBD

The 2026 Lyon metropolitan election was held on 15 and 22 March 2026 to elect the metropolitan council.

== Background ==
The election dates were set by decree on 27 August 2025 for 15 March 2026 (first round) and 22 March 2026 (second round).

Bruno Bernard, a member of The Ecologists (LE), was first elected as president of the Metropolis in 2020. LFI, which was part of his majority at the beginning, split away and supported a candidate against Bernard, who was running for reelection. Cédric Van Styvendael was proposed as the leading candidate of the Socialist Party (PS) for this election, although it was unclear whether the PS would support Bernard or support a PS candidate. Véronique Sarselli and Sébastien Michel were both contenders for the nomination of The Republicans (LR), with the latter being supported by Laurent Wauquiez. Sarselli won the internal vote against Michel and became the official LR candidate for the office of president of the Metropolis.

== Electoral system ==
The 2026 election was the second direct election to the Metropolitan Council of the Metropolis of Lyon. The election took place in 14 constituencies featuring lists. To avoid a second round being held in a constituency, a list needs to obtain more than 50% of votes in the first round. Every list obtaining more than 10% can access the second round. Every list getting more than 5% can merge with a list that accessed the second round. The list coming first in the last round in a constituency gets 25% of the constituency seats, while the other 75% are given proportionately to each list that obtained more than 5% of the votes.

== Candidates ==
=== The Ecologists ===
- Bruno Bernard, incumbent president of the Metropolis

=== The Republicans ===
- Véronique Sarselli, mayor of Sainte-Foy-lès-Lyon and metropolitan councillor

=== National Rally ===
- Tiffany Joncour, deputy

== Campaign ==
In November 2025, Jean-Michel Aulas, candidate for mayor of Lyon, publicly endorsed Véronique Sarselli as candidate for the Metropolis, after he has said he wanted to support lists in the Metropolis as well.

== Results ==
Candidate	Party	First round		Second round		Seats	
Candidate	Party	Votes	%	Votes	%	Nb.	+/-
Olivier Minoux	LO						
Bruno Bernard	LE						
Véronique Sarselli	LR						
Tiffany Joncour	RN-UDR						
Registered voters			100		100		
Abstention							
Total votes							
Blank or invalid votes							
Valid votes							

== See also ==
- 2026 Lyon municipal election
