= 2026 New Zealand electoral calendar =

2026 elections in New Zealand

This is a list of elections that have been and will be held in New Zealand and associated states and territories in 2026. Included are any local or national elections or by-elections, as well as elections to iwi governing bodies, and any party leadership votes.

== Overview of key electoral events ==
=== General elections ===
| Date | Jurisdiction | Government before | Head of government before | Government after | Head of government after |
|---|---|---|---|---|---|
| 5 February | Tokelau | 11th Government | Kelihiano Kalolo | 12th Government | Kelihiano Kalolo |
| 5 February | Tokelau | 11th Government | Esera Fofō Tuisano | 12th Government | Esera Fofō Tuisano |
| 5 February | Tokelau | 11th Government | Alapati Tavite | 12th Government | Alapati Tavite |
| 2 May | Niue | 2nd Tagelagi Ministry | Dalton Tagelagi | 3rd Tagelagi Ministry | Dalton Tagelagi |
| 12 August | Cook Islands | CIP–Ind. (15 / 24) | Mark Brown | CIP (13 / 24) | Mark Brown |
| 11 November | New Zealand | National–ACT–NZ First (68 / 123) | Christopher Luxon | to be determined | |

=== Party leadership votes ===
| Date | Party | Role | Person before | Person after | Support | Voters |
|---|---|---|---|---|---|---|
| 21 April | National | Leader | Christopher Luxon | Christopher Luxon | >25 / 49 | National MPs |
| 28 June | ACT | Deputy | Brooke van Velden (resigned) | Nicole McKee | >5 / 11 | ACT MPs |
| 25–26 July | Green | Co-leaders | Marama Davidson | Marama Davidson | >75% | Green local branch delegates |
| 25–26 July | Green | Co-leaders | Chlöe Swarbrick | Chlöe Swarbrick | >75% | Green local branch delegates |
| 12 August | National | Leader | Christopher Luxon | Christopher Luxon | >25 / 49 | National MPs |

== January to March ==
- 5 February: Tokelauan general election
- 3 March:
  - Central Otago District Council by-election in the Vincent ward
  - Hastings District Rural Community Board by-election in the Maraekākaho subdivision
  - Murupara Community Board by-election in the Galatea-Waiohau subdivision
  - Tāneatua Community Board by-election
  - Rotorua Lakes Community Board by-election
  - Ōraka Aparima Community Board by-election
  - Mataura Community Board by-election
  - Twizel Community Board by-election
- 9 March–20 March: Several takiwā held elections as part of the 2026 Ngāpuhi takiwā elections

== April to June ==
- 9 April: Ōtara-Papatoetoe Local Board by-election in the Papatoetoe subdivision
- 20 April: Ngati Porou iwi by-election in the 3rd rohenga
- 21 April: National Party caucus vote of confidence in party leader Christopher Luxon
- 2 May: Niuean general election
- 12 May: Dunedin City Council by-election in the at-large ward
- 17 May–30 June: Waikato Tainui marae elections
- 22 May: Masterton District Council by-election in the at-large ward
- 5 June: Featherston Community Board by-election
- 10 June: Franklin Local Board by-election in the Wairoa subdivision
- 22 June: Akaroa Community by-election
- 28 June: ACT caucus members select Nicole McKee as the new deputy leader of the party

== July to September ==
- 14 July: Ngāpuhi ki Whangārei takiwā election (part of 2026 Ngāpuhi takiwā elections)
- 25–26 July: Confirmation vote of Green Party co-leaders held at their AGM per party constitution
- 12 August:
  - National Party caucus vote of confidence in party leader Christopher Luxon
  - Cook Islands general election
- 21 August: Greater Wellington Regional Council by-election in the Wairarapa constituency.
- 18 September: Chatham Islands Council by-election
- 19 September: Waikato Tainui iwi election
- 25 September: Bay of Plenty Regional Council by-election in the Eastern Bay of Plenty general constituency

== October to December ==
- 1 October: Wellington City Council by-election in the Takapū/Northern general ward
- 2 October: South Wairarapa District Council by-election in the Featherston ward
- 16 October: Porirua City Council by-election in the Onepoto general ward
- 11 November: New Zealand general election
- 27 November: Waitaki District Council by-election in the Ōamaru ward

== See also ==
- 2026 in New Zealand
