= 2018 Jefferson County, Alabama Sheriff election =

2018 Jefferson County Sheriff election
- November 6, 2018
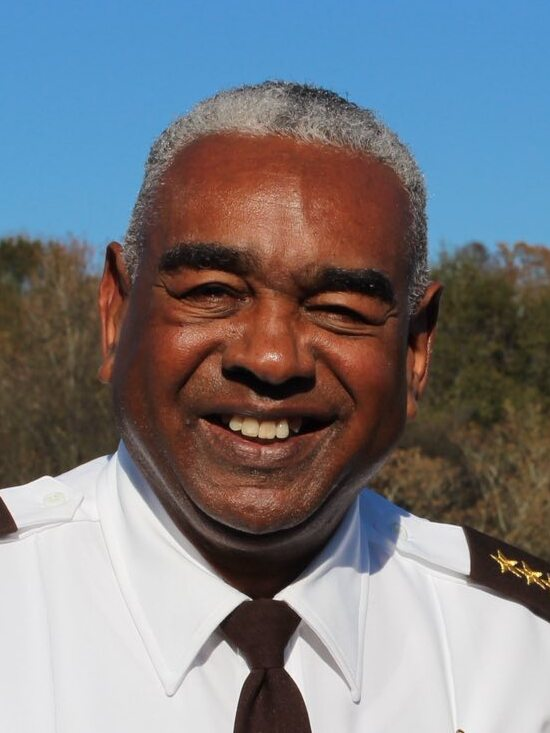

Nominee	Mark Pettway	Mike Hale
Party	Democratic	Republican
Popular vote	131,369	123,917
Percentage	51.4%	48.5%
Sheriff before election
Mike Hale
Republican
Elected Sheriff
Mark Pettway
Democratic

The 2018 Jefferson County Sheriff election was held on November 6, 2018, to elect the sheriff of Jefferson County, Alabama. The primary election was held on June 5, 2018. Incumbent Republican sheriff Mike Hale lost re-election to a sixth term. Democratic nominee Mark Pettway won the election.

== Republican primary ==
=== Candidates ===
==== Nominee ====
- Mike Hale, incumbent sheriff

== Democratic primary ==
=== Candidates ===
==== Nominee ====
- Mark Pettway, detective

==== Eliminated in runoff ====
- Wilson Hale

==== Eliminated in primary ====
- Wallace Anger Jr., sheriff's deputy
- Heath Boackle, detective

=== Results ===
Democratic primary
Party	Candidate	Votes	%
Democratic	Mark L. Pettway	26,354	42.76
Democratic	Wilson Hale	15,794	25.62
Democratic	Wallace Anger Jr.	11,398	18.49
Democratic	Heath Boackle	8,093	13.13
Total votes		61,936	100.00

=== Runoff ===
==== Results ====
Democratic primary runoff
Party	Candidate	Votes	%
Democratic	Mark L. Pettway	21,797	71.36
Democratic	Wilson Hale	8,746	28.64
Total votes		30,543	100.00

== General election ==
=== Results ===
Mike Hale conceded the election on the night of the election, and congratulated sheriff-elect Mark Pettway.

2018 Jefferson County Sheriff election
Party	Candidate	Votes	%
Democratic	Mark L. Pettway	131,369	51.43
Republican	Mike Hale	123,917	48.51
Write-in		139	0.05
Total votes		255,425	100.00
