= 2026 Jefferson County, Alabama Sheriff election =

2026 Jefferson County Sheriff election
- November 3, 2026
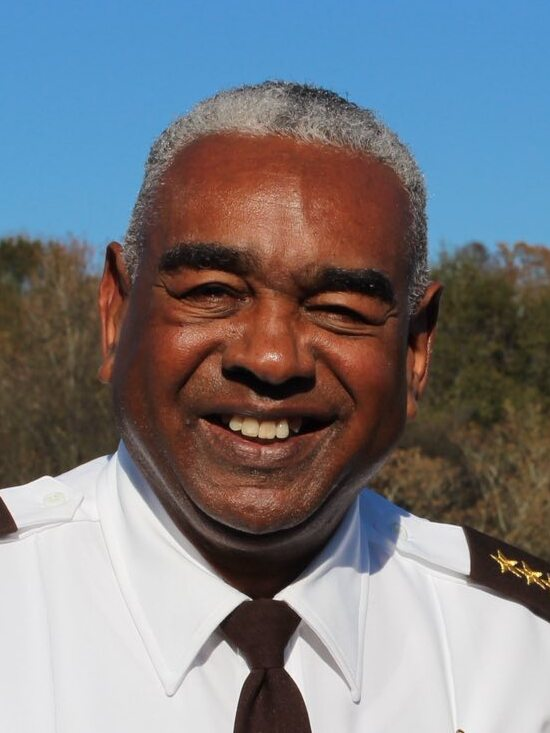

| Candidate | Mark Pettway | Jacob Reach |
| Party | Democratic | Republican |
Sheriff before election
Mark Pettway
Democratic
Elected Sheriff
Mark Pettway
Democratic

The 2026 Jefferson County sheriff election was held on November 3, 2026, to elect the sheriff of Jefferson County, Alabama. Primary elections were held on May 19. Incumbent Democratic Sheriff Mark Pettway was re-elected to a third consecutive four-year term.

== Democratic primary ==
=== Candidates ===
==== Nominee ====
- Mark Pettway, incumbent sheriff

==== Eliminated in primary ====
- Chris Anderson, retired homicide detective
- Jude Washington, narcotics investigator

=== Endorsements ===
Mark Pettway

County officials

- Mike Hale, former sheriff (1999, 2003–2019) (Republican)

=== Fundraising ===
Campaign finance reports as of May 18, 2026
| Candidate | Raised | Other receipts | Spent | Cash on hand |
|---|---|---|---|---|
| Chris Anderson (D) | $11,912 | $7,000 | $12,876 | $6,035 |
| Mark Pettway (D) | $659,217 | $84,704 | $587,463 | $147,940 |
| Jude Washington (D) | $92,540 | $30,520 | $85,992 | $37,067 |
Source: Alabama FCPA

=== Results ===
Democratic primary
| Party | Candidate | Votes | % |
|---|---|---|---|
| Democratic | Mark Pettway (incumbent) | 65,187 | 74.84 |
| Democratic | Chris Anderson | 16,437 | 18.87 |
| Democratic | Jude Washington | 5,474 | 6.28 |
| Total votes | | 87,098 | 100.00 |

== Republican primary ==
=== Candidates ===
==== Nominee ====
- Jacob Reach, former police captain

=== Fundraising ===
Campaign finance reports as of May 18, 2026
| Candidate | Raised | Other receipts | Spent | Cash on hand |
|---|---|---|---|---|
| Jacob Reach (R) | $10,360 | $6,975 | $14,306 | $3,161 |
Source: Alabama FCPA

== General election ==
=== Fundraising ===
Campaign finance reports as of November 2, 2026
| Candidate | Raised | Other receipts | Spent | Cash on hand |
|---|---|---|---|---|
| Mark Pettway (D) | $718,368 | $84,704 | $677,999 | $116,554 |
| Jacob Reach (R) | $22,430 | $7,820 | $30,269 | $-168 |
Source: Alabama FCPA

=== Results ===
2026 Jefferson County sheriff election
| Party | Candidate | Votes | % |
|---|---|---|---|
| Democratic | Mark Pettway (incumbent) | | |
| Republican | Jacob Reach | | |
| Write-in | | | |
| Total votes | | | 100.00 |
