= 2026 Jefferson County, Alabama, elections =

Local elections in Alabama

- November 3, 2026

A general election was held in Jefferson County, Alabama, on November 3, 2026, to elect various county officials. Primary elections were held on May 19, and primary runoff elections was held on June 16 in races where no candidate received a majority of the vote.

== Sheriff ==
Incumbent Democratic sheriff Mark Pettway is running for re-election.

== County Commission ==
All five seats on the Jefferson County Commission will be up for election in 2026.

== Tax Assessor ==
=== Democratic primary ===
==== Candidates ====
===== Nominee =====
- Gaynell Hendricks, incumbent tax assessor

=== General election ===
==== Results ====
2026 Jefferson County Tax Assessor election
| Party | Candidate | Votes | % |
|---|---|---|---|
| Democratic | Gaynell Hendricks (incumbent) | | |
| Write-in | | | |
| Total votes | | | 100.00 |

== Tax Collector ==
=== Democratic primary ===
==== Candidates ====
===== Nominee =====
- JT Smallwood, incumbent tax collector

=== General election ===
==== Results ====
2026 Jefferson County Tax Collector election
| Party | Candidate | Votes | % |
|---|---|---|---|
| Democratic | JT Smallwood (incumbent) | | |
| Write-in | | | |
| Total votes | | | 100.00 |

== Assistant Tax Assessor (Bessemer division) ==
=== Democratic primary ===
==== Candidates ====
===== Nominee =====
- Charles R. Winston, incumbent assistant tax assessor

=== Republican primary ===
==== Candidates ====
===== Nominee =====
- Delor Baumann, former mayor of Hueytown (2004–2016) and perennial candidate

=== General election ===
==== Results ====
2026 Jefferson County Assistant Tax Assessor election (Bessemer division)
| Party | Candidate | Votes | % |
|---|---|---|---|
| Democratic | Charles R. Winston (incumbent) | | |
| Republican | Delor Baumann | | |
| Write-in | | | |
| Total votes | | | 100.00 |

== Assistant Tax Collector (Bessemer division) ==
=== Democratic primary ===
==== Candidates ====
===== Nominee =====
- Mykeshia Myles Jones

===== Eliminated in runoff =====
- Ron Marshall, incumbent assistant tax collector

===== Eliminated in primary =====
- Danielle Lewis Matthews

==== Results ====
Democratic primary
| Party | Candidate | Votes | % |
|---|---|---|---|
| Democratic | Mykeshia Myles Jones | 8,678 | 36.34 |
| Democratic | Ron Marshall (incumbent) | 8,664 | 36.28 |
| Democratic | Danielle Lewis Matthews | 6,536 | 27.37 |
| Total votes | | 23,878 | 100.00 |

==== Runoff ====
===== Results =====
Democratic primary runoff
| Party | Candidate | Votes | % |
|---|---|---|---|
| Democratic | Mykeshia Myles Jones | 3,914 | 52.76 |
| Democratic | Ron Marshall (incumbent) | 3,504 | 47.24 |
| Total votes | | 7,418 | 100.00 |

=== General election ===
==== Results ====
2026 Jefferson County Assistant Tax Collector election (Bessemer division)
| Party | Candidate | Votes | % |
|---|---|---|---|
| Democratic | Mykeshia Myles Jones | | |
| Write-in | | | |
| Total votes | | | 100.00 |

== District Court ==
=== Place 1 ===
==== Democratic primary ====
===== Candidates =====
====== Nominee ======
- Martha Cook, incumbent judge

=== General election ===
==== Results ====
2026 Jefferson County District Court election, place 1
| Party | Candidate | Votes | % |
|---|---|---|---|
| Democratic | Martha Cook (incumbent) | | |
| Write-in | | | |
| Total votes | | | 100.00 |

=== Place 2 ===
==== Democratic primary ====
===== Candidates =====
====== Nominee ======
- Maria Fortune, incumbent judge

=== General election ===
==== Results ====
2026 Jefferson County District Court election, place 2
| Party | Candidate | Votes | % |
|---|---|---|---|
| Democratic | Maria Fortune (incumbent) | | |
| Write-in | | | |
| Total votes | | | 100.00 |

=== Place 7 ===
==== Democratic primary ====
===== Candidates =====
====== Nominee ======
- Tiffany Jones

====== Eliminated in primary ======
- Jimmy Earley Jr.
- Hope Marshall

===== Results =====
Democratic primary
| Party | Candidate | Votes | % |
|---|---|---|---|
| Democratic | Tiffany Jones | 41,591 | 69.50 |
| Democratic | Hope Marshall | 14,972 | 25.02 |
| Democratic | Jimmy Earley Jr. | 3,276 | 5.48 |
| Total votes | | 59,839 | 100.00 |

=== General election ===
==== Results ====
2026 Jefferson County District Court election, place 7
| Party | Candidate | Votes | % |
|---|---|---|---|
| Democratic | Tiffany Jones | | |
| Write-in | | | |
| Total votes | | | 100.00 |

== Circuit Court ==
=== Place 1 ===
==== Democratic primary ====
===== Candidates =====
====== Nominee ======
- Brian Huff, incumbent judge

=== General election ===
==== Results ====
2026 Jefferson County Circuit Court election, place 1
| Party | Candidate | Votes | % |
|---|---|---|---|
| Democratic | Brian Huff (incumbent) | | |
| Write-in | | | |
| Total votes | | | 100.00 |

=== Place 2 ===
==== Democratic primary ====
===== Candidates =====
====== Nominee ======
- Shanta Owens, incumbent judge

=== General election ===
==== Results ====
2026 Jefferson County Circuit Court election, place 2
| Party | Candidate | Votes | % |
|---|---|---|---|
| Democratic | Shanta Owens (incumbent) | | |
| Write-in | | | |
| Total votes | | | 100.00 |

=== Place 3 ===
==== Democratic primary ====
===== Candidates =====
====== Nominee ======
- Kechia Davis, incumbent judge

=== General election ===
==== Results ====
2026 Jefferson County Circuit Court election, place 3
| Party | Candidate | Votes | % |
|---|---|---|---|
| Democratic | Kechia Davis (incumbent) | | |
| Write-in | | | |
| Total votes | | | 100.00 |

=== Place 10 ===
==== Democratic primary ====
===== Candidates =====
====== Nominee ======
- Ruby Clark, incumbent judge

=== General election ===
==== Results ====
2026 Jefferson County Circuit Court election, place 10
| Party | Candidate | Votes | % |
|---|---|---|---|
| Democratic | Ruby Clark (incumbent) | | |
| Write-in | | | |
| Total votes | | | 100.00 |

== Board of Education ==
=== District 4 ===
==== Republican primary ====
===== Candidates =====
====== Nominee ======
- Ronnie Dixon, incumbent board member

=== General election ===
==== Results ====
2026 Jefferson County Board of Education election, district 4
| Party | Candidate | Votes | % |
|---|---|---|---|
| Republican | Ronnie Dixon (incumbent) | | |
| Write-in | | | |
| Total votes | | | 100.00 |
