= 2026 Alabama local elections =

Local elections in Alabama

- August 26, 2026, November 3, 2026
- Cities with municipal elections. Click on a city name to skip to that city's section.

Local elections were held in the U.S. state of Alabama to elect nonpartisan municipal officers on August 25, 2026, and partisan county-level officials on November 3, 2026. Primary elections for the partisan elections took place on May 19, 2026.

== County ==
=== Baldwin County ===
==== Commission ====
All four seats on the Baldwin County Commission are up for election.

==== Sheriff ====
Incumbent Republican sheriff Anthony Lowery was appointed in 2024. He is eligible to run for election.

=== Jefferson County ===
==== Commission ====
All five seats on the Jefferson County Commission are up for election.

==== Sheriff ====
Two-term incumbent Democratic sheriff Mark Pettway was re-elected in 2022 with 52% of the vote. He is eligible to run for re-election.

=== Madison County ===
==== Sheriff ====
Two-term incumbent Republican sheriff Kevin H. Turner was re-elected in 2022. He is eligible to run for re-election.

=== Mobile County ===
==== Sheriff ====
One-term incumbent Republican sheriff Paul Burch was elected in 2022. He is eligible to run for re-election.

=== Tuscaloosa County ===
==== Sheriff ====
Three-term incumbent Republican sheriff Ron Abernathy was re-elected in 2022. He is eligible to run for re-election.

== Municipal ==
Municipal elections will take place in six municipalities in 2026.

=== Auburn ===
All seats of the Auburn City Council and the mayor of Auburn are up for election in 2026.

=== Huntsville ===
Three seats on the Huntsville City Council are up for election in 2026.
