= Hôtel de Ville, Villeurbanne =

Town hall in Villeurbanne, France

Hôtel de Ville
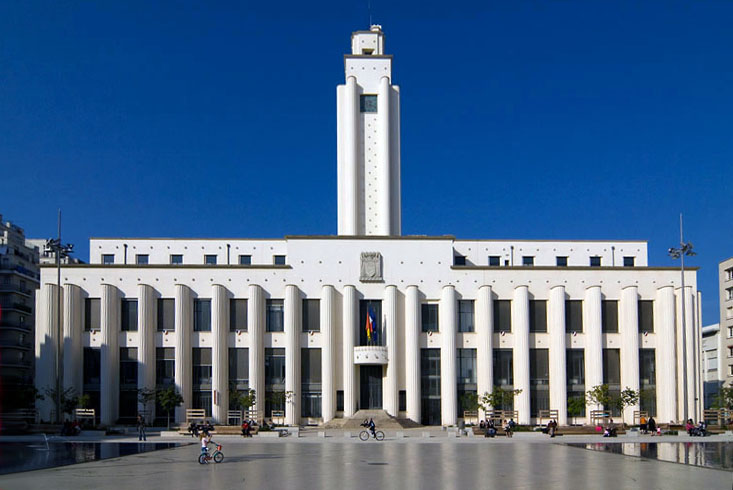
- The main frontage of the Hôtel de Ville in October 2007

General information
- Type: City hall
- Architectural style: Art Deco style
- Location: Villeurbanne, France
- Coordinates: 45.7665°N 4.8796°E
- Completed: 1934

Height
- Height: 65 metres (213 ft)

Design and construction
- Architect: Robert Giroud

Monument historique
- Official name: Hôtel de ville
- Type: Inscrit
- Designated: 1991
- Reference no.: PA00118150

The Hôtel de Ville (French pronunciation: [otɛl də vil], City Hall) is a municipal building in Villeurbanne, Metropolis of Lyon, eastern France, standing on Place du Dr Lazare Goujon. It was designated a monument historique by the French government in 1991.

== History ==
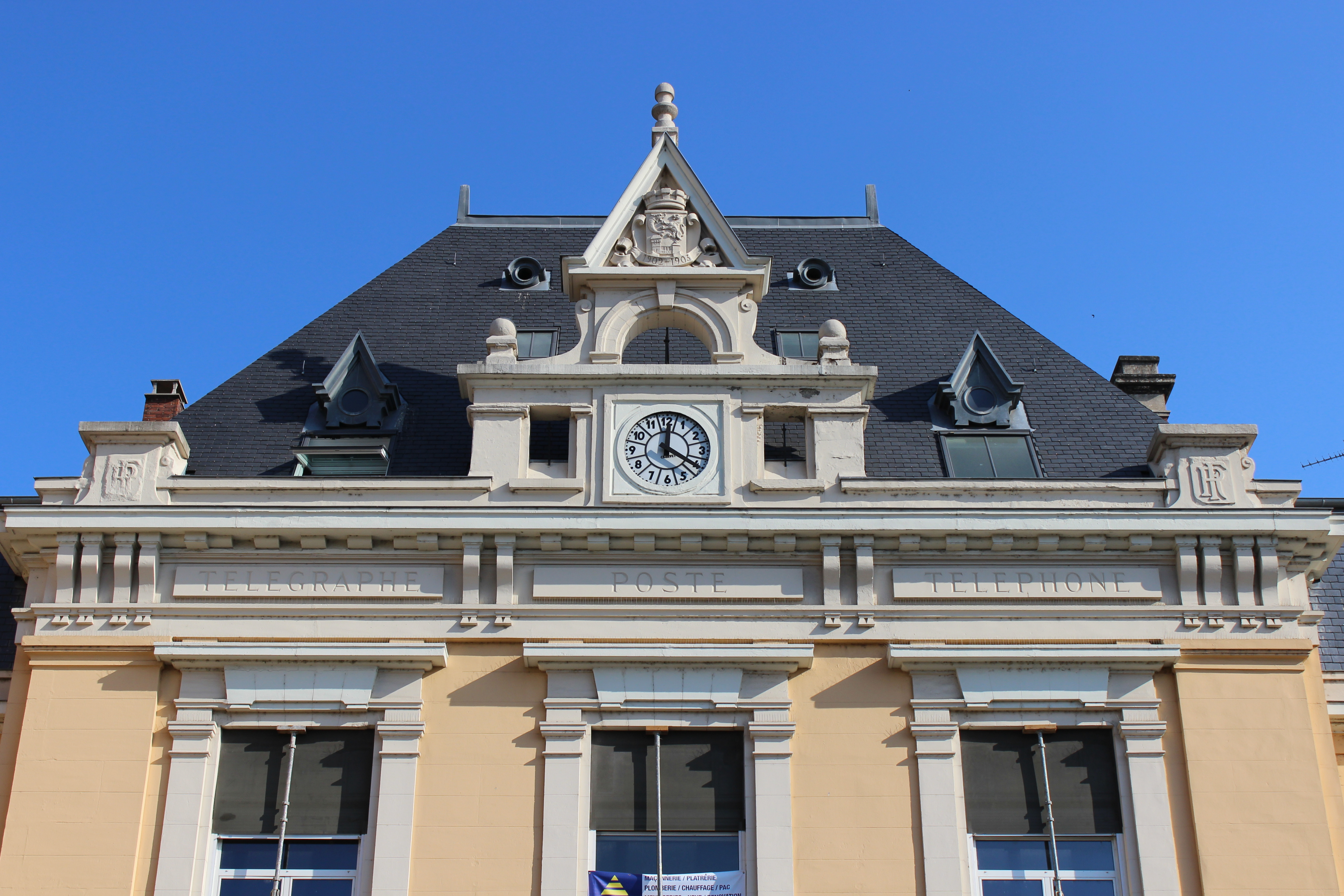
The town hall in Place Grandclément completed in 1904

Following the French Revolution, the new town council initially met in the local clergy house in the district of Cusset in the east of modern Villeurbanne. In 1828, the mayor, François-Xavier Monavon, decided to move to the growing district of Grandclément in the south of modern Villeurbanne: a new building in Place du Plâtre (now Place Grandclément) was completed in 1834.

By the late 19th century, the building was dilapidated and the town council, led by the mayor, Frédéric Faÿs, decided to demolish the previous structure and to commission a new building, also in Place Grandclément. This building was designed by Michel Collet in the neoclassical style, built in brick with a cement render finish and was officially opened by the Minister of Commerce, Industry and Posts, Georges Trouillot, on 7 February 1904.

Following a significant increase in population after the First World War, a new district, Gratte-ciel, developed in the centre of modern Villeurbanne and rapidly became the new town centre. The town council led by the mayor, Lazare Goujon, decided to commission a modern town hall as part of an initiative to allow Villeurbanne to maintain its own distinct character, notwithstanding the stated ambitions of Lyon City Council to annexe the town. The site Goujon selected was on the north side of a new square with a large water feature in the centre and a new theatre on the south side. Following a design competition involving 12 firms, Robert Giroud of Lyon was selected as the preferred bidder. The new building was designed in the Art Deco style, built in reinforced concrete and was officially opened by the mayor of Lyon, Édouard Herriot, on 17 June 1934.

The design involved a symmetrical main frontage of 15 bays facing onto the new square. The centre bay featured a short flight of steps leading up to a glass doorway; there was a semicircular balcony and a French door on the first floor. The other bays were fenestrated with plate glass on both floors. The bays were flanked by full-height fluted columns which were decorative and had no capitals. At roof level, there was a parapet, the height of which was raised in the centre and decorated with a coat of arms. There was also a recessed attic floor, fenestrated by small square casement windows. Behind the central bay was a square belfry which was 65 metres (213 ft) high. Internally, the principal rooms included the Salle de Mariages (wedding room), with an organ designed and built at the factory founded by Aristide Cavaillé-Coll, and the Salle des Commissions (commissions room), with a fine fireplace.

On 24 August 1944, during the Second World War, local resistance fighters led by Captain Jacques Lefort, mounted an insurrection against German occupation, formed a command post in the town hall and erected barricades around the building. With superior armaments, the German 11th Panzer Division eventually regained control on 26 August 1944. However, the town was liberated by the 1st Free French Division, just a few days later, on 2 September 1944.
