= 2026 Anchorage municipal election =

Local election in Alaska, US

- April 7, 2026

A general municipal election was held in Anchorage, Alaska, on April 7, 2026. Six seats on the Anchorage Assembly, two seats on the Anchorage School Board, and twelve ballot proposals were on the ballot.

== Assembly ==
=== District 1, Seat B ===
==== Candidates ====
===== Declared =====
- Nick Danger, former Girdwood supervisor and perennial candidate
- Justin Milette, real estate worker
- Max Powers, former member of the Downtown community council
- Sydney Scout, nonprofit consultant

==== Endorsements ====
Sydney Scout

Organizations

- Planned Parenthood Alliance Advocates – Alaska

Political parties

- Alaska Democratic Party

==== Results ====
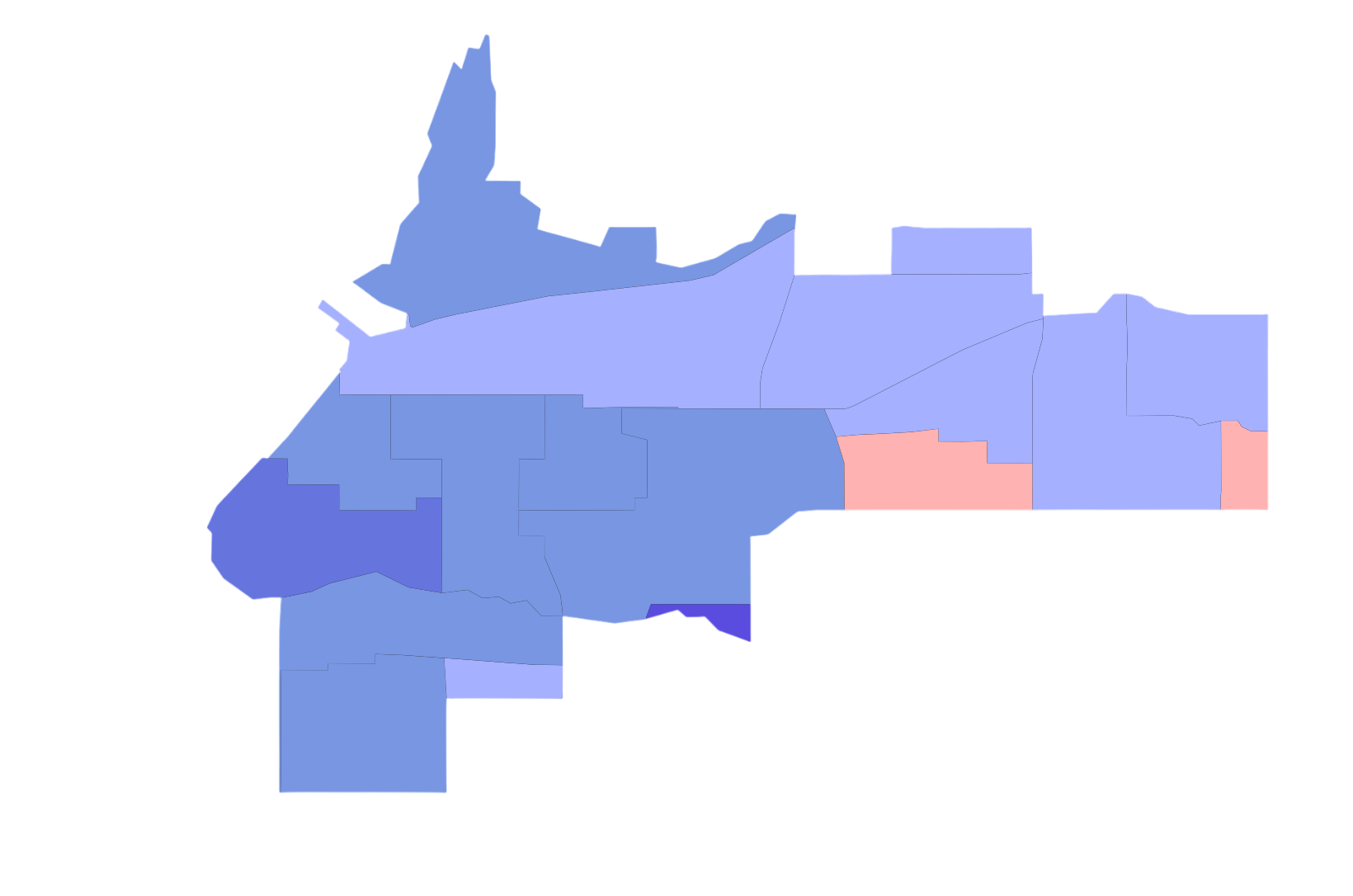
Results by precinct: Scout: 40–50%; 50–60%; 60–70%; 70–80%; Milette: 40–50%

2026 Anchorage Assembly election, district 1
Candidate	Votes	%
Sydney Scout	3,484	58.00
Justin Milette	1,974	32.86
Nick Danger	325	5.41
Max Powers	224	3.73
Total votes	6,007	100.00

=== District 2, Seat C ===
==== Candidates ====
===== Declared =====
- Donald Handeland, civil engineer
- Kyle Walker, civil engineer

==== Endorsements ====
Donald Handeland

Political parties

- Alaska Republican Party

==== Results ====
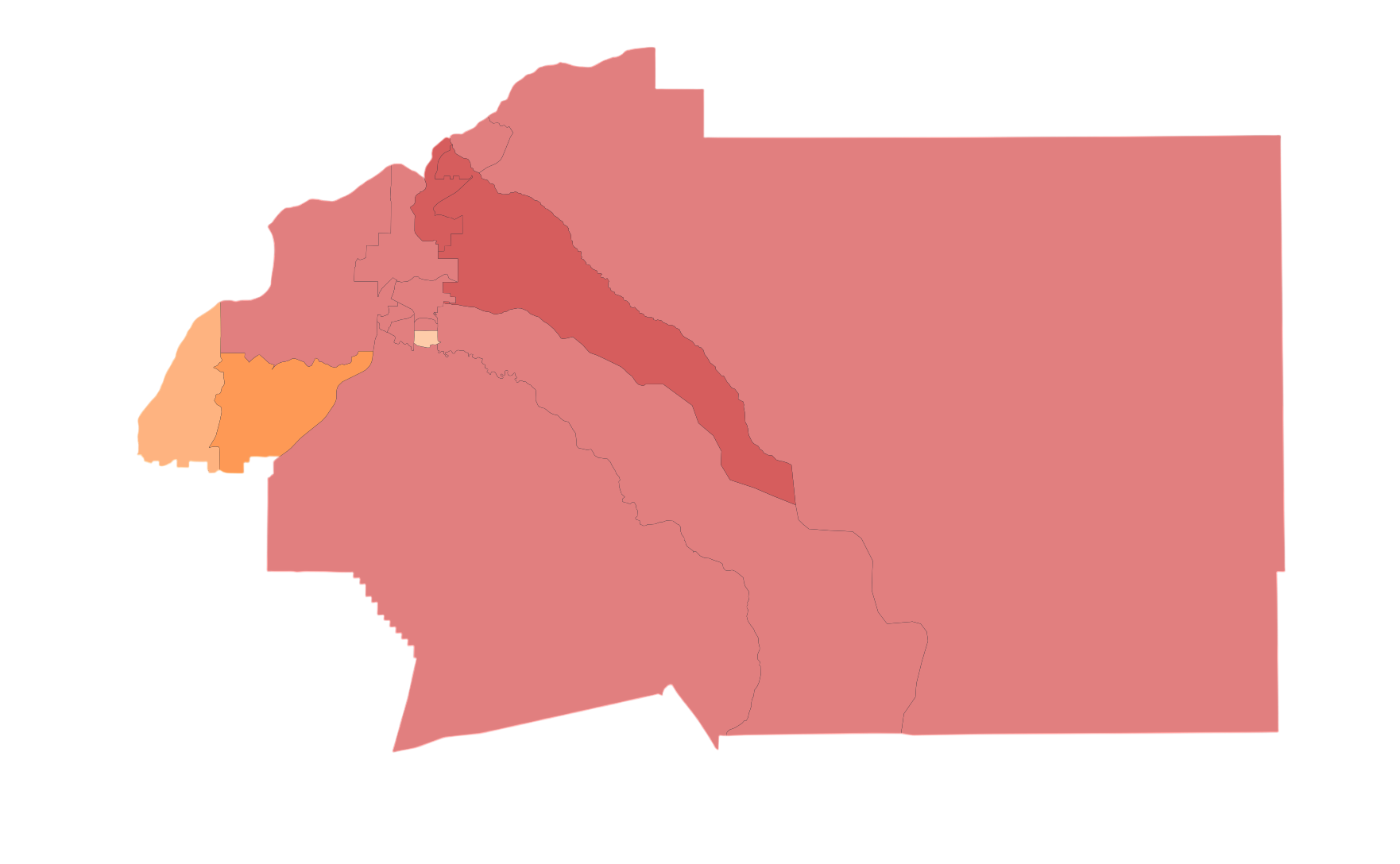
Results by precinct: Handeland: 50–60%; 60–70%; Walker: 40–50%; 50–60%; 60–70%

2026 Anchorage Assembly election, district 2
Candidate	Votes	%
Donald Handeland	5,815	57.53
Kyle Walker	4,293	42.47
Total votes	10,108	100.00

=== District 3, Seat E ===
==== Candidates ====
===== Declared =====
- Anna Brawley, incumbent assemblymember
- Brian Flynn, real estate manager

==== Endorsements ====
Anna Brawley

Organizations

- Planned Parenthood Alliance Advocates – Alaska

Political parties

- Alaska Democratic Party
Brian Flynn

Political parties

- Alaska Republican Party

==== Results ====
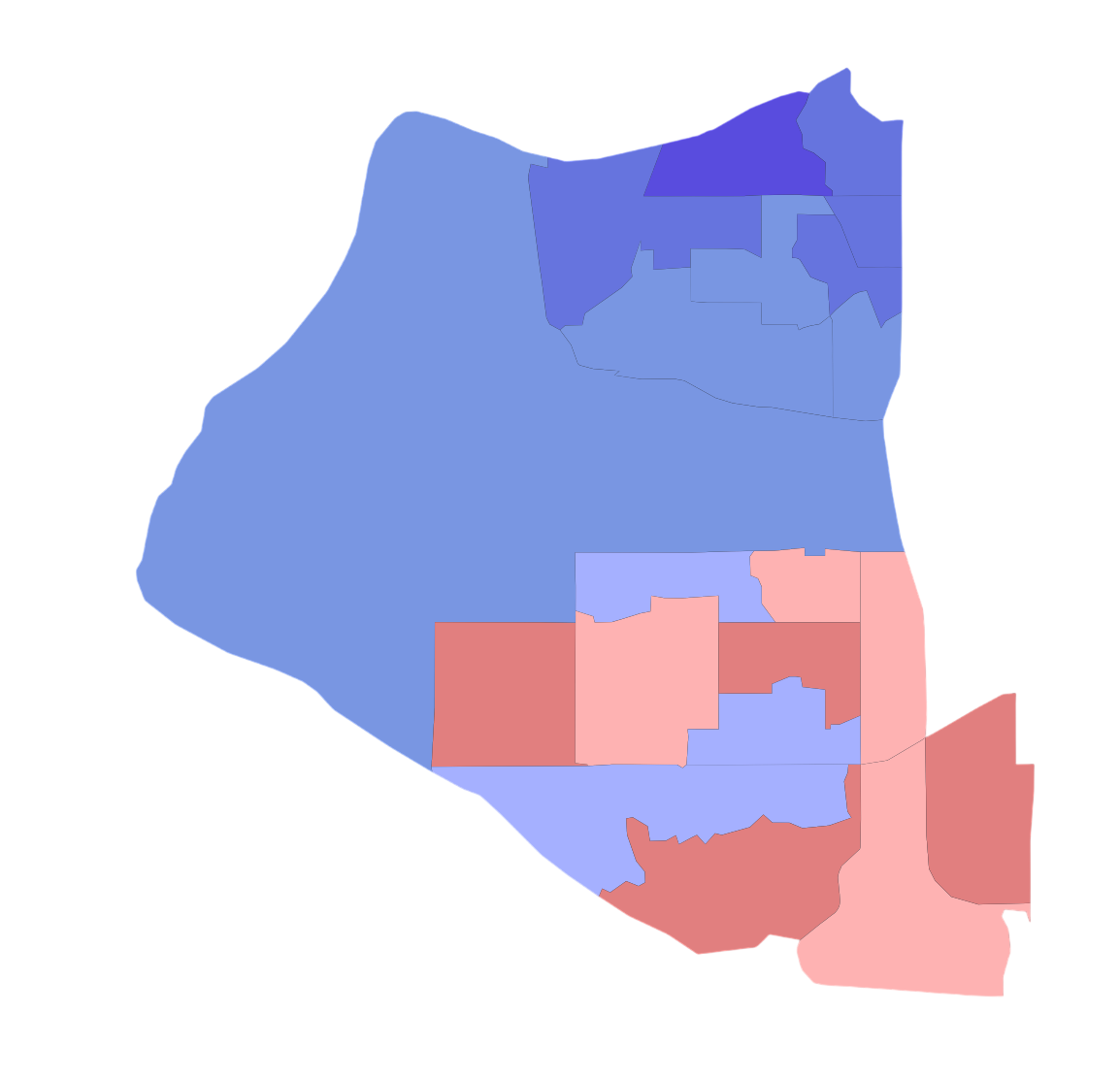
Results by precinct: Brawley: 40–50%; 50–60%; 60–70%; 70–80%; Flynn: 40–50%; 50–60%

2026 Anchorage Assembly election, district 3
Candidate	Votes	%
Anna Brawley (incumbent)	7,092	54.56
Brian Flynn	5,906	45.44
Total votes	12,998	100.00

=== District 4, Seat G ===
==== Candidates ====
===== Declared =====
- Dave Donley, school board member and former Republican state senator from the J district
- Janice Park, former nurse and Democratic candidate for state senate in 2022
- Kim Winston

==== Endorsements ====
Dave Donley

Political parties

- Alaska Republican Party
Janice Park

Organizations

- Planned Parenthood Alliance Advocates – Alaska

Political parties

- Alaska Democratic Party

==== Results ====
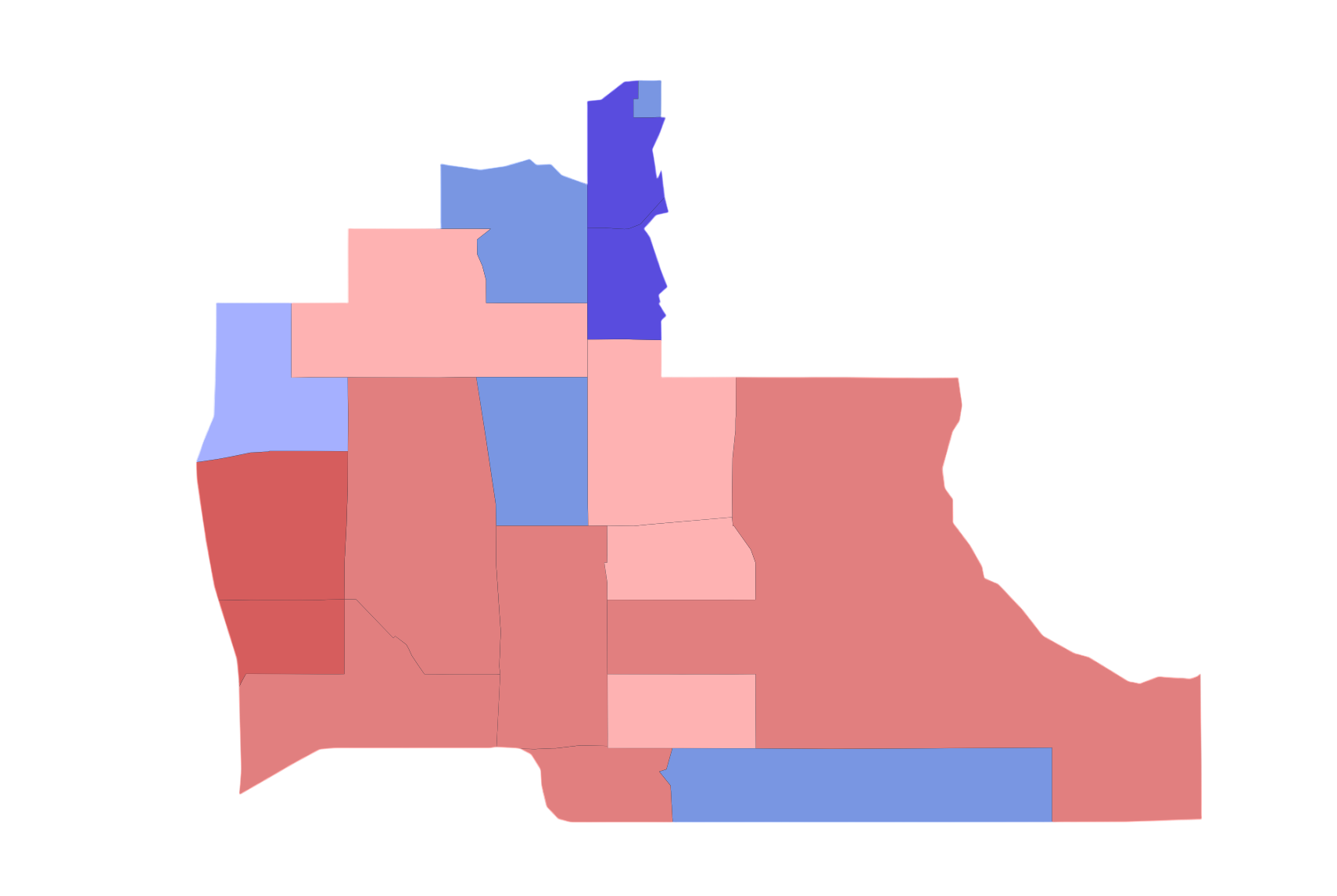
Results by precinct: Park: 40–50%; 50–60%; 70–80%; Donley: 40–50%; 50–60%; 60–70%

2026 Anchorage Assembly election, district 4
Candidate	Votes	%
Janice Park	5,030	48.22
Dave Donley	5,004	47.97
Kim Winston	397	3.81
Total votes	10,431	100.00

=== District 5, Seat I ===
==== Candidates ====
===== Declared =====
- Cody Anderson, associate pastor
- George Martinez, incumbent assemblymember

==== Endorsements ====
Cody Anderson

Political parties

- Alaska Republican Party
George Martinez

Political parties

- Alaska Democratic Party

==== Results ====
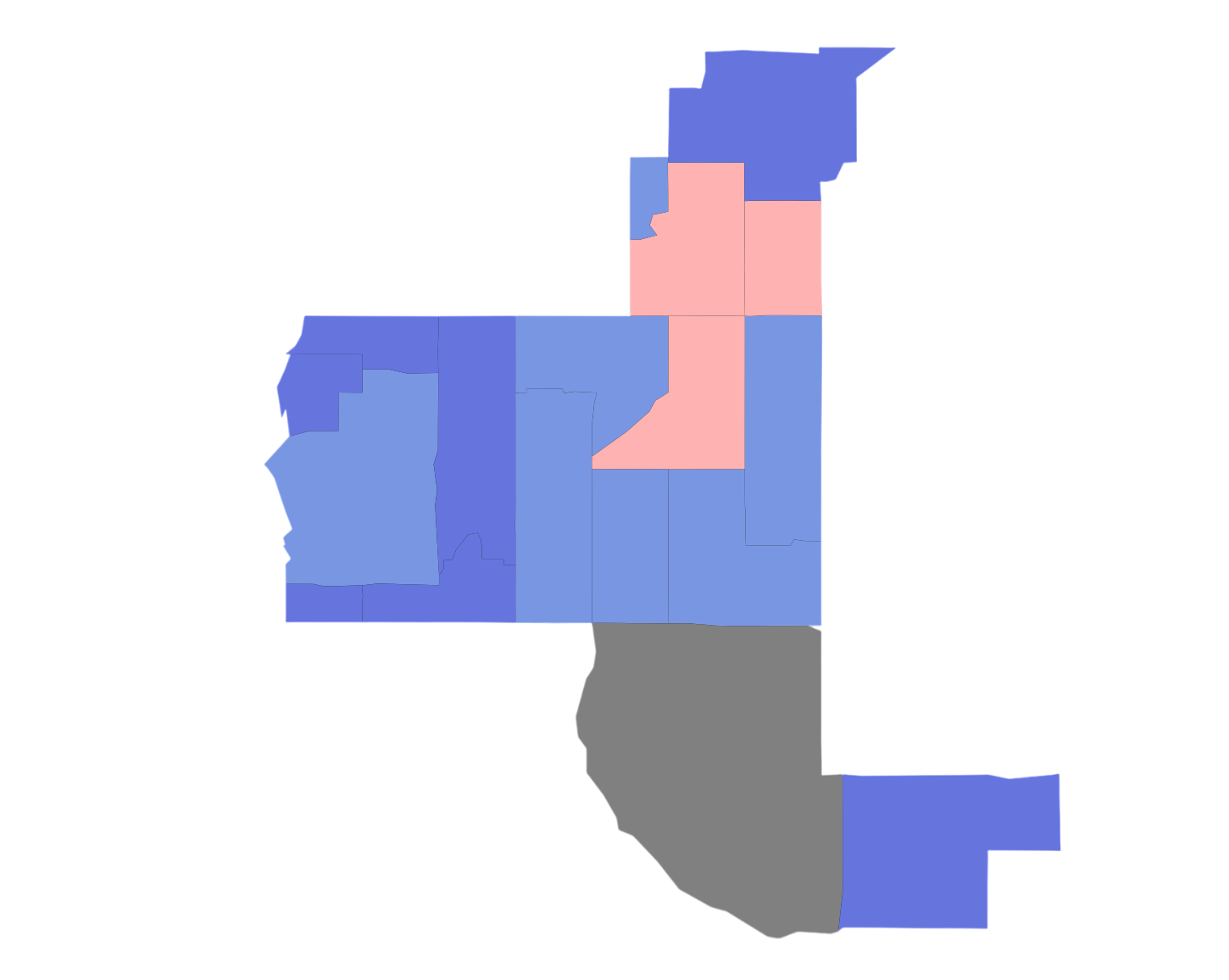
Results by precinct: Martinez: 50–60%; 60–70%; Anderson: 40–50%

2026 Anchorage Assembly election, district 5
Candidate	Votes	%
George Martinez (incumbent)	5,359	58.52
Cody Anderson	3,799	41.48
Total votes	9,158	100.00

=== District 6, Seat K ===
==== Candidates ====
===== Declared =====
- Zac Johnson, incumbent assemblymember
- Janelle Anausuk Sharp, geochemist
- Bruce Vergason, business owner

==== Endorsements ====
Bruce Vergason

Political parties

- Alaska Republican Party

==== Results ====
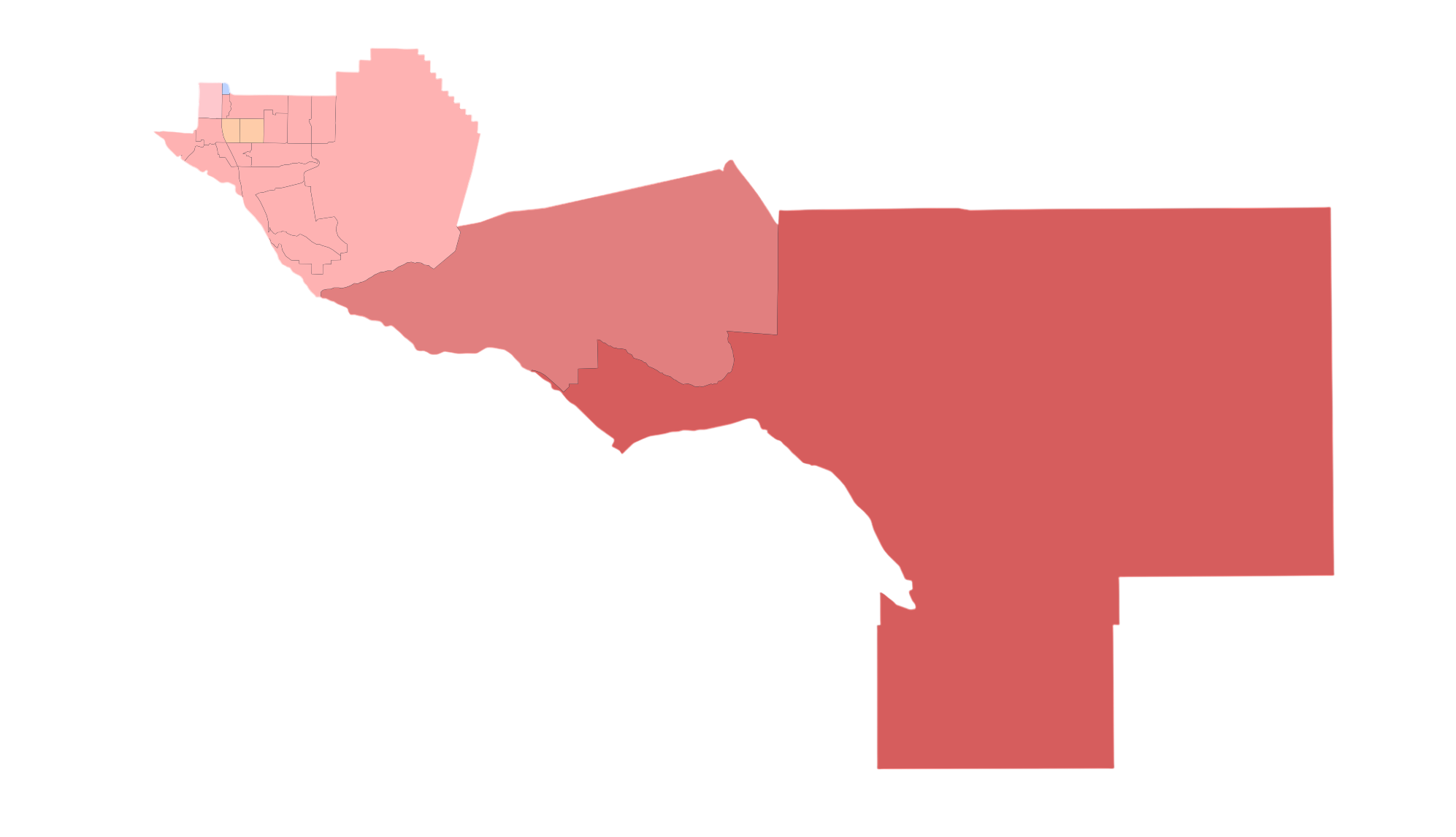
Results by precinct: Johnson: 30–40%; 40–50%; 50–60%; 60–70%; Vergason: 40–50%; Sharp: 30–40%

2026 Anchorage Assembly election, district 6
Candidate	Votes	%
Zac Johnson (incumbent)	7,479	47.67
Bruce Vergason	6,355	40.51
Jannelle Anausuk Sharp	1,855	11.82
Total votes	15,680	100.00

== School Board ==
=== Seat C ===
==== Candidates ====
===== Declared =====
- Rachel Blakeslee, executive director and former teacher
- Alexander Rosales, retired sergeant and candidate in 2025

==== Endorsements ====
Rachel Blakeslee

Organizations

- Planned Parenthood Alliance Advocates – Alaska

Political parties

- Alaska Democratic Party

==== Campaign ====
Rosales has received criticism for past comments on social media, including advocating for the school district to be shut down, and praise for Adolf Hitler. Blakeslee used these comments on campaign flyers mailed to voters.

==== Results ====
2026 Anchorage School Board election, seat C
Candidate	Votes	%
Rachel Blakeslee	35,981	58.55
Alexander Rosales	25,468	41.45
Total votes	61,449	100.00

=== Seat D ===
==== Candidates ====
===== Declared =====
- Dustin Darden, perennial candidate
- Sharon Gibbons, special education teacher
- Paul McDonogh, director of a tribal education department

==== Endorsements ====
Paul McDonogh

Organizations

- Planned Parenthood Alliance Advocates – Alaska

Political parties

- Alaska Democratic Party

==== Results ====
2026 Anchorage School Board election, seat D
Candidate	Votes	%
Paul McDonogh	31,037	51.06
Sharon Gibbons	20,627	33.94
Dustin Darden	9,116	15.00
Total votes	60,780	100.00

== Ballot measures ==
Of the twelve propositions, propositions 1, 5, 6, 9, and 10, are the only questions that the entire city vote on.

=== Proposition 1 ===
Proposition 1 allocates $79 million for improvements in the Anchorage School District.

==== Results ====
Anchorage Proposition 1
Choice	Votes	%
For	32,657	49.58
Against	33,207	50.42
Total	65,864	100.00
Source: Municipality of Anchorage

=== Proposition 2 ===
Proposition 2 allocates $38 million for Anchorage Roads and Drainage Service Area infrastructure projects.

==== Results ====
Anchorage Proposition 2
Choice	Votes	%
For	40,177	60.94
Against	25,757	39.06
Total	65,934	100.00
Source: Municipality of Anchorage

=== Proposition 3 ===
Proposition 3 allocates $6.1 million for projects in the Anchorage Parks and Recreation Service Area.

==== Results ====
Anchorage Proposition 3
Choice	Votes	%
For	36,836	55.72
Against	29,270	44.28
Total	66,106	100.00
Source: Municipality of Anchorage

=== Proposition 4 ===
Proposition 4 allocates $350 thousand for improvements to the Anchorage Metropolitan Police Service Area at the police department's Elmore Station.

==== Results ====
Anchorage Proposition 4
Choice	Votes	%
For	31,603	48.58
Against	33,452	51.42
Total	65,055	100.00
Source: Municipality of Anchorage

=== Proposition 5 ===
Proposition 5 allocates $7.2 million for improvements to various community facilities.

==== Results ====
Anchorage Proposition 5
Choice	Votes	%
For	35,185	53.49
Against	30,594	46.51
Total	65,779	100.00
Source: Municipality of Anchorage

=== Proposition 6 ===
Proposition 6 allocates $8.9 million for public safety and transit projects.

==== Results ====
Anchorage Proposition 6
Choice	Votes	%
For	37,068	56.08
Against	29,028	43.92
Total	66,096	100.00
Source: Municipality of Anchorage

=== Proposition 7 ===
Proposition 7 allocates $2.5 million to replace fire trucks in the Anchorage Fire Service Area.

==== Results ====
Anchorage Proposition 7
Choice	Votes	%
For	42,315	64.28
Against	23,515	35.72
Total	65,830	100.00
Source: Municipality of Anchorage

=== Proposition 8 ===
Proposition 8 allocates $1.72 million to parking and trail improvements at the Chugach State Park.

==== Results ====
Anchorage Proposition 8
Choice	Votes	%
For	33,313	50.86
Against	32,189	49.14
Total	65,502	100.00
Source: Municipality of Anchorage

=== Proposition 9 ===
Proposition 9 allocates $12 million to fund the Anchorage School District, which is the maximum amount allowed by state law.

==== Results ====
Anchorage Proposition 9
Choice	Votes	%
For	32,737	49.66
Against	33,187	50.34
Total	65,924	100.00
Source: Municipality of Anchorage

=== Proposition 10 ===
Proposition 10 removes references to a former telephone utility from the city charter.

==== Results ====
Anchorage Proposition 10
Choice	Votes	%
For	48,476	76.52
Against	14,875	23.48
Total	63,351	100.00
Source: Municipality of Anchorage

=== Proposition 11 ===
Proposition 11 proposes a mill levy to be used for roads and snowplowing in Bear Valley.

==== Results ====
Anchorage Proposition 11
Choice	Votes	%
For	85	86.73
Against	13	13.27
Total	98	100.00
Source: Municipality of Anchorage

=== Proposition 12 ===
Proposition 12 asks voters in the Eagle Bluff Estates Subdivision if a new light service area should be created.

==== Results ====
Anchorage Proposition 12
Choice	Votes	%
For	7	30.43
Against	16	69.57
Total	23	100.00
Source: Municipality of Anchorage
