= Henry Bertrand =

French silk weaver

Henry Bertrand was a French silk weaver of the later nineteenth and early twentieth centuries, from Villeurbanne near Lyon. He founded the well known silk company, Henry Bertrand. The original collections can be seen in museums around the world including the Silk Museum in Lyon and the Cleveland Museum of Art. With the onslaught of man-made fabrics the original company declined until the 1960s when it sold its French mills. The company's remaining office in London was acquired by the Gilbert family in 1981.

== Sources ==
- Philippe Videlier (2000). "Les mythologies lyonnaises de la soie et l'intégration communautaire". Cahiers Millénaire 3. 3 (20): 7–15. OCLC 418716597.
