= 2022 Jefferson County, Alabama Sheriff election =

2022 Jefferson County Sheriff election
- November 8, 2022
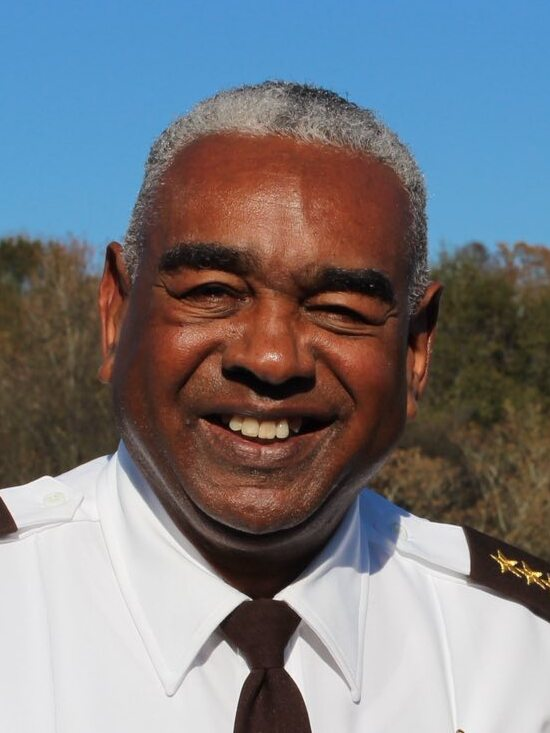

Nominee	Mark Pettway	Jared Hudson
Party	Democratic	Republican
Popular vote	102,560	94,164
Percentage	52.1%	47.8%
Sheriff before election
Mark Pettway
Democratic
Elected Sheriff
Mark Pettway
Democratic

The 2022 Jefferson County Sheriff election was held on November 8, 2022, to elect the sheriff of Jefferson County, Alabama. The primary election was held on May 24, 2022. Incumbent Democratic sheriff Mark Pettway was re-elected to a second consecutive four-year term.

== Democratic primary ==
=== Candidates ===
==== Nominee ====
- Mark Pettway, incumbent sheriff

==== Eliminated in primary ====
- Kareem Easley, Birmingham Police Sgt.
- Wilson Hale, candidate for sheriff in 2018
- Felicia Rucker-Sumerlin, Jefferson County Sheriff's Office deputy chief

=== Results ===
Democratic primary
Party	Candidate	Votes	%
Democratic	Mark Pettway	35,743	76.19
Democratic	Felicia Rucker-Sumerlin	5,684	12.13
Democratic	Kareem Easley	3,313	7.06
Democratic	Wilson Hale	2,188	4.67
Total votes		46,928	100.00

== Republican primary ==
=== Candidates ===
==== Nominee ====
- Jared Hudson, former Navy SEAL

== General election ==
=== Results ===
2022 Jefferson County Sheriff election
Party	Candidate	Votes	%
Democratic	Mark Pettway	102,560	52.10
Republican	Jared Hudson	94,164	47.80
Write-in		128	0.10
Total votes		196,852	100.00
