= Metropolitan Council of Lyon =

Body governing the metropolis of Lyon, France

Metropolitan Council of Lyon Conseil de la métropole de Lyon
- Logo of the Lyon Metropolis

Type
- Type: Unicameral

Leadership
- President: Bruno Bernard, EELV; 2 July 2020

Structure
- Seats: 150
- Political groups: Executive (84): Europe Ecology – The Greens (58); Socialist Party (14); French Communist Party (6); La France Insoumise (3); GRAM (3); Opposition (66): The Republicans (33); LREM diss. – PRG (12); Synergies Métropole (11); La République En Marche! (9); The Metropolis for All (2)

Website
- www.grandlyon.com

The Metropolitan Council of Lyon (French: Conseil de la métropole de Lyon) is the deliberative assembly of the Metropolis of Lyon, a French territorial collectivity with special status, made up of 150 metropolitan councillors.

Since 2026, its president has been Véronique Sarselli of The Republicans (LR).

== History ==
Created on 1 January 2015, the Metropolis of Lyon replaced the Urban Community of Lyon and, in its territory, the Rhône department. It exercises both the competencies of a department and those of a metropolitan area.

Since 2020, the city council, comprising 150 members (instead of the 166 originally planned in the ministerial ordinance before its review in parliament), is elected at the same time as the municipal councils by direct universal suffrage within the framework of 14 electoral constituencies according to the voting method applicable to municipalities with more than 1,000 inhabitants.

== Headquarters ==
The headquarters of the Metropolis of Lyon is the same as that of the former Urban Community of Lyon: the building at 20 Rue du Lac in the 3rd arrondissement of Lyon, in the district of La Part-Dieu.

== Executive ==
The Metropolitan Council was re-elected on 28 June 2020 and elected a new president, Bruno Bernard (EELV).

The Metropolitan Council is made up of a president and 23 vice presidents, which form the executive:

List of vice-presidents of the Lyon Metropolitan Council
Order	Name	Party	Delegation
1st	Emeline Baume	EELV	Economy, employment, commerce, digital and public procurement
2nd	Beatrice Vessiller	EELV	Town planning and living environment
3rd	Renaud Payre	Gauche unie – Manufacture de la cité	Housing, social housing and city politics
4th	Michele Picard	PCF	Fight against discrimination and gender equality
5th	Jean-Charles Kohlhaas	EELV	Travel, intermodality and urban logistics
6th	Hélène Geoffroy	PS	Equality of territories
7th	Cedric Van Styvendael	PS	Culture
8th	Lucie Vacher	EELV	Childhood, family and youth
9th	Bertrand Artigny	EELV	Finance
10th	Zemorda Khelifi	EELV	Human resources
11th	Pierre Athanaz	EELV	Environment, animal protection and risk prevention
12th	Veronique Moreira	EELV	Education and colleges
13th	Fabien Bagnon	EELV	Roads and active mobility
14th	Anne Grosperrin	EELV	Water and sanitation
15th	Jeremy Camus	EELV	Agriculture, food and regional resilience
16th	Severine Hémain	EELV	Integration policies
17th	Jean-Michel Longueval	PS	Higher education and research
18th	Laurence Boffet	Lyon en commun	Participation and citizen initiatives
19th	Pascal Blanchard	EELV	Health, the elderly and people with disabilities
20th	Isabelle Petiot	EELV	Waste reduction and treatment and cleanliness
21st	Philippe Guelpa-Bonaro	EELV	Climate, energy and reduction of advertising
22nd	Helene Dromain	EELV	European and international cooperation and tourism
23rd	Yves Ben Itah	EELV	Associative life and sports policies
