= Villeurbanne =

Villeurbanne Velorbana (Arpitan)
- Commune
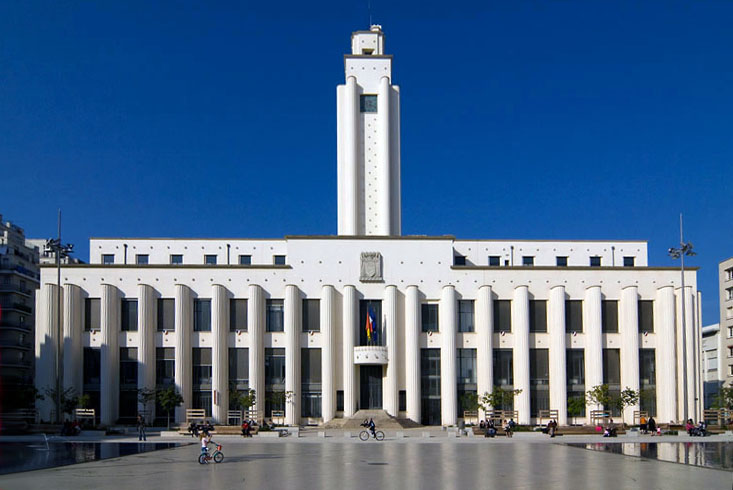
- The Hôtel de Ville in Villeurbanne

- Coat of arms
- Location of Villeurbanne
- Location within France Location within Auvergne-Rhône-Alpes
- Coordinates: 45°46′00″N 4°52′49″E
- Country: France
- Region: Auvergne-Rhône-Alpes
- Metropolis: Lyon Metropolis
- Arrondissement: Lyon

Government
  - Mayor (2026–2032): Cédric Van Styvendael (PS)
- Area^{1}: 14.52 km^{2} (5.61 sq mi)
- Elevation: 181 m (594 ft)
- Highest elevation: 189 m (620 ft)
- Lowest elevation: 165 m (541 ft)
- Population (2023): 163,684
  - Density: 11,270/km^{2} (29,200/sq mi)
- Time zone: UTC+01:00 (CET)
  - Summer (DST): UTC+02:00 (CEST)
- INSEE/Postal code: 69266 /69100
- ^{1} French Land Register data, which excludes lakes, ponds, glaciers > 1 km^{2} (0.386 sq mi or 247 acres) and river estuaries.

Villeurbanne (French pronunciation: [vilœʁban]; Arpitan: Velorbana) is a commune in the Metropolis of Lyon in the Auvergne-Rhône-Alpes region in eastern France.

It is situated northeast of central Lyon, with which it forms the heart of the second-largest metropolitan area in France after that of Paris. With a population of 163,684, Villeurbanne is the second-largest commune in the metropolitan area of Lyon and the 16th most populated in France, and the most populous commune that is neither a prefecture nor a sub-prefecture.

== History ==
The current location of downtown Villeurbanne is known to have been inhabited as far back as 6000 BC. Its current name comes from a Gallo-Roman farming area, established at about the same time as Lyon (then Lugdunum) and known as the Villa Urbana ("town house"). It would then become Urbanum, then Villa Urbane and, ultimately, Villeurbanne.

Villeurbanne has belonged to the kingdom of France since 1349. It was then separated from La Guillotière (A former city lately incorporated into Lyon as the 3rd, 6th, 7th and 8th Arrondissement) by the river La Rize, a former branch of the Rhône River.

Until the 19th century, the city was merely a patchwork of distinct villages separated by fields and undeveloped land. These villages have mostly survived, and nowadays form the neighborhoods of Charpennes, Cusset, Croix-Luizet, Maisons-Neuves, etc.

With the industrial era, Villeurbanne's economy soared: the textile industry was the first to bloom, followed by mechanical and chemical ones. The factories lured in numerous immigrants, most notably from Italy.

=== 20th century ===
Transforming from a rural community to an industrial town, Villeurbanne underwent a tremendous demographic boom in the late 1920s. From 3,000 inhabitants in 1928, its population rocketed to 82,000 in 1931. Mayor Lazare Goujon (elected 1924) engaged the city in a vast public works initiative. Arguably the most visible heritage of this program is the Gratte-Ciel, a housing complex made up of two Art Deco towers and annex smaller buildings, lining up along the Avenue Henri Barbusse. These structures built between 1924 and 1934 are the work of architect Môrice Leroux, with a contribution of Tony Garnier. They are one of the most notable Art Deco structures in France and the 19-story twin towers have become an emblem of the city.

The Hôtel de Ville was designed by Robert Giroud, a disciple of Tony Garnier and friend of Môrice Leroux.

=== 21st century ===
In 2025, the city was faced with a dilapidated building in the city center, which was used for squatting.

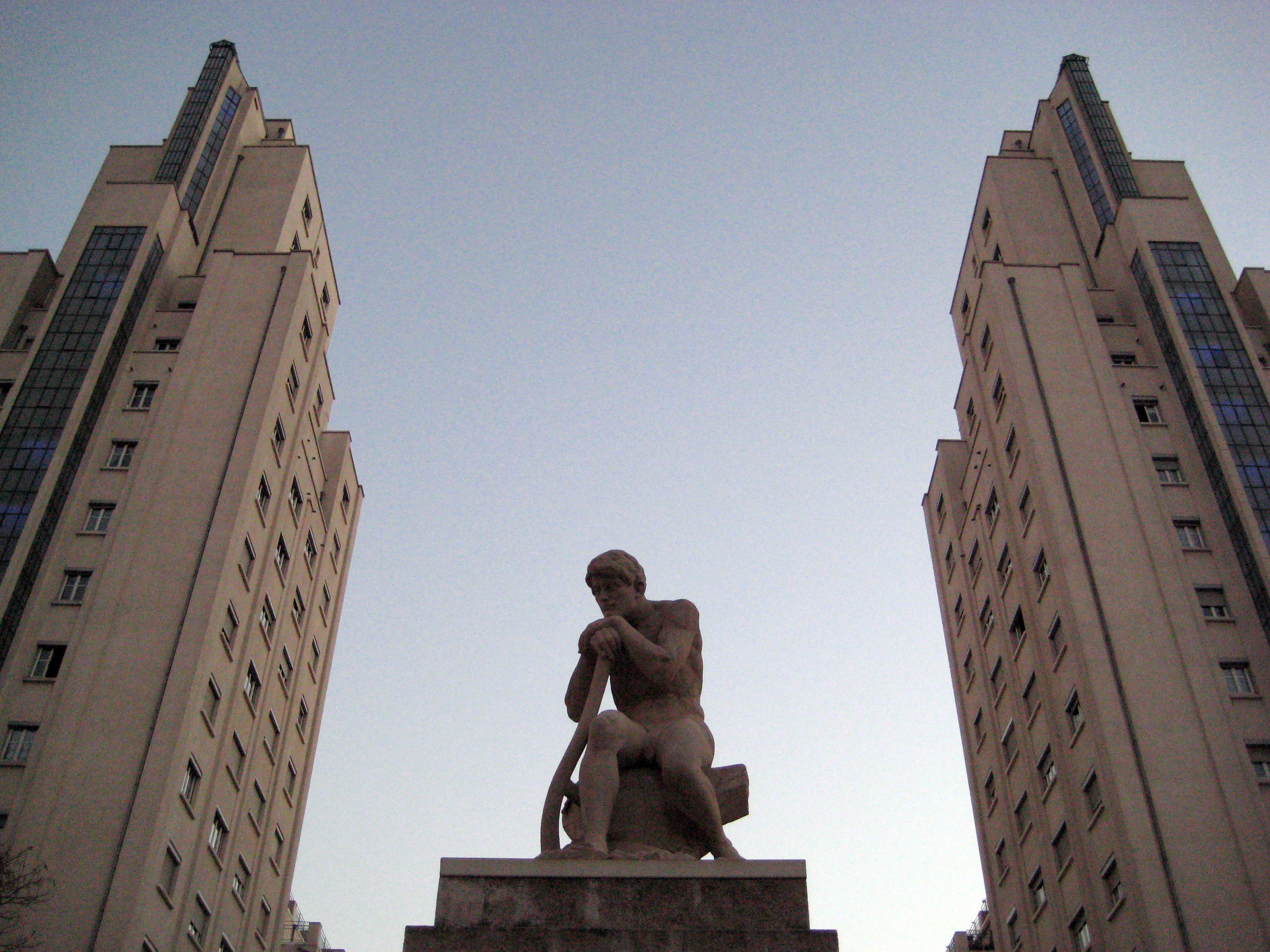
Gratte-Ciel complex, Villeurbanne

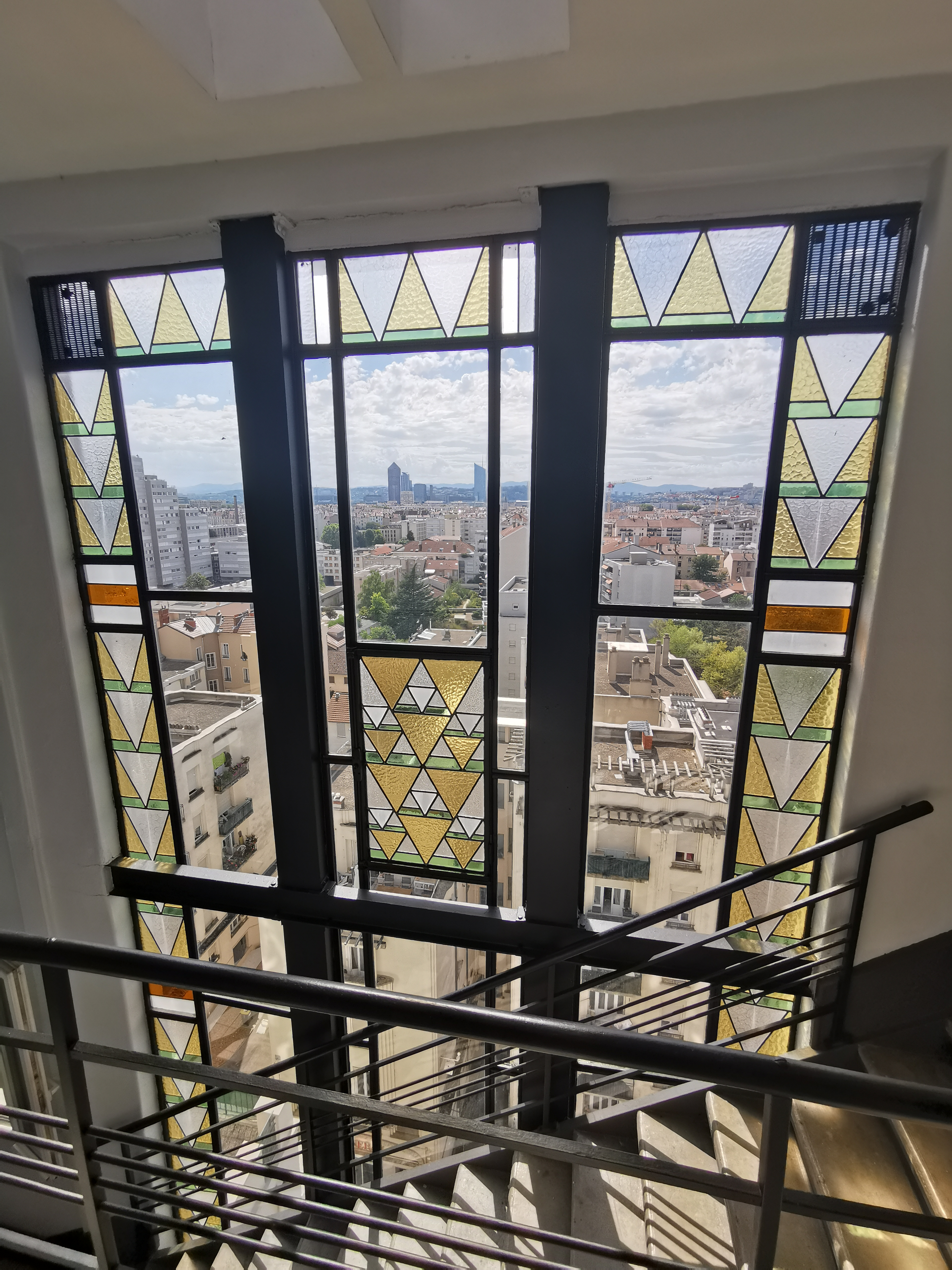
Interior of one of the gratte-ciel.

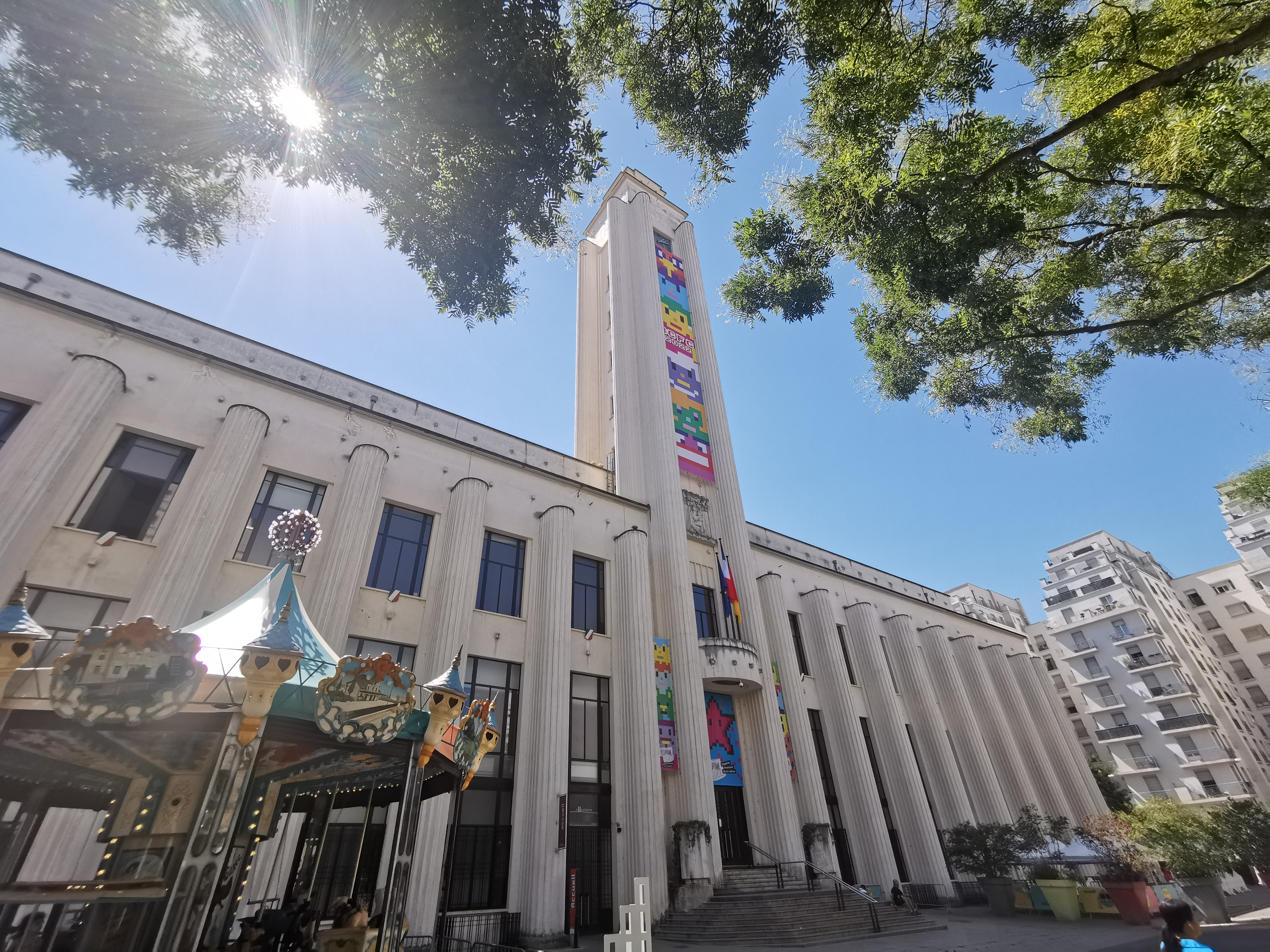
The Hôtel de Ville

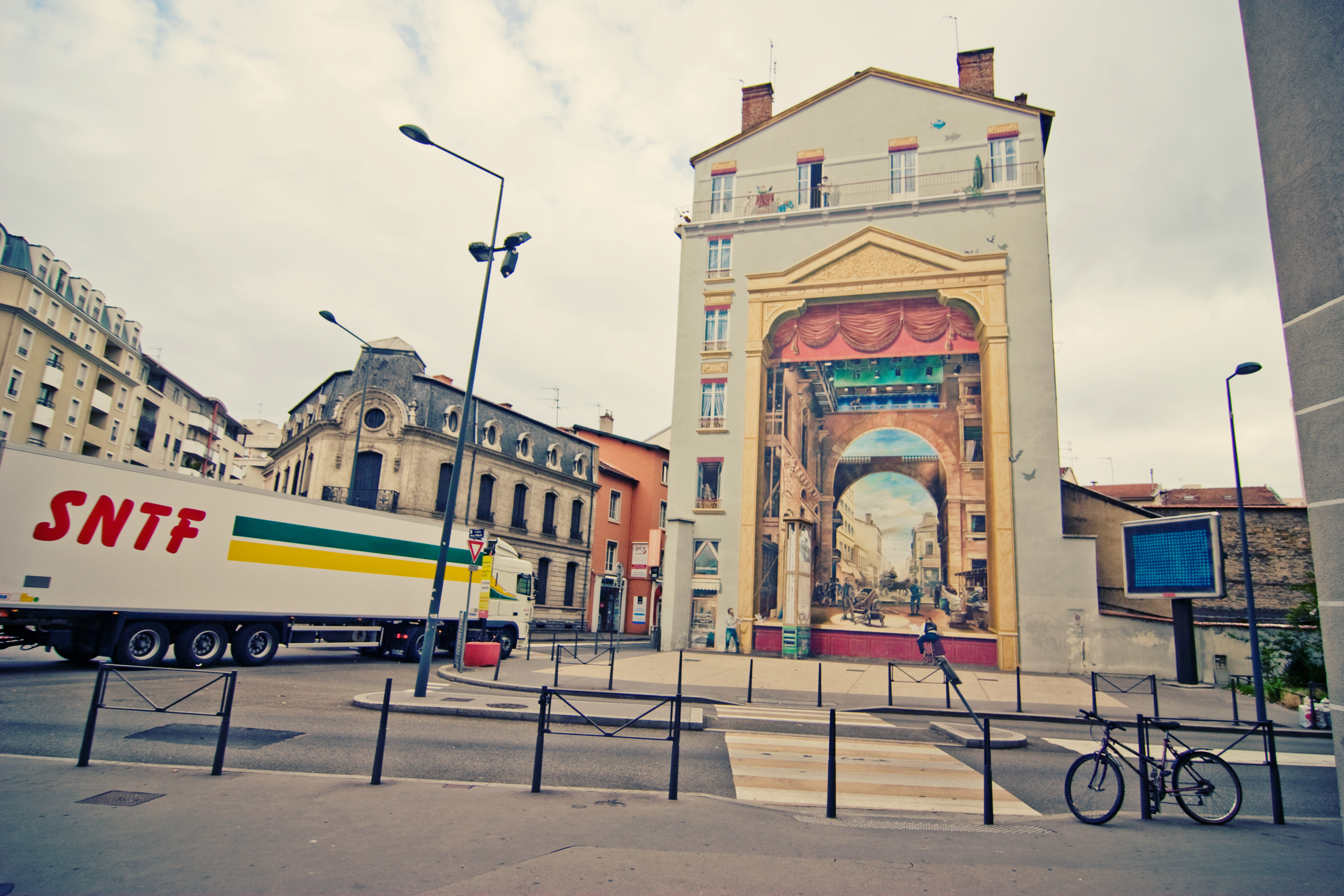
Trompe l'œil, Charpennes

== Education ==
=== Primary and secondary schools ===
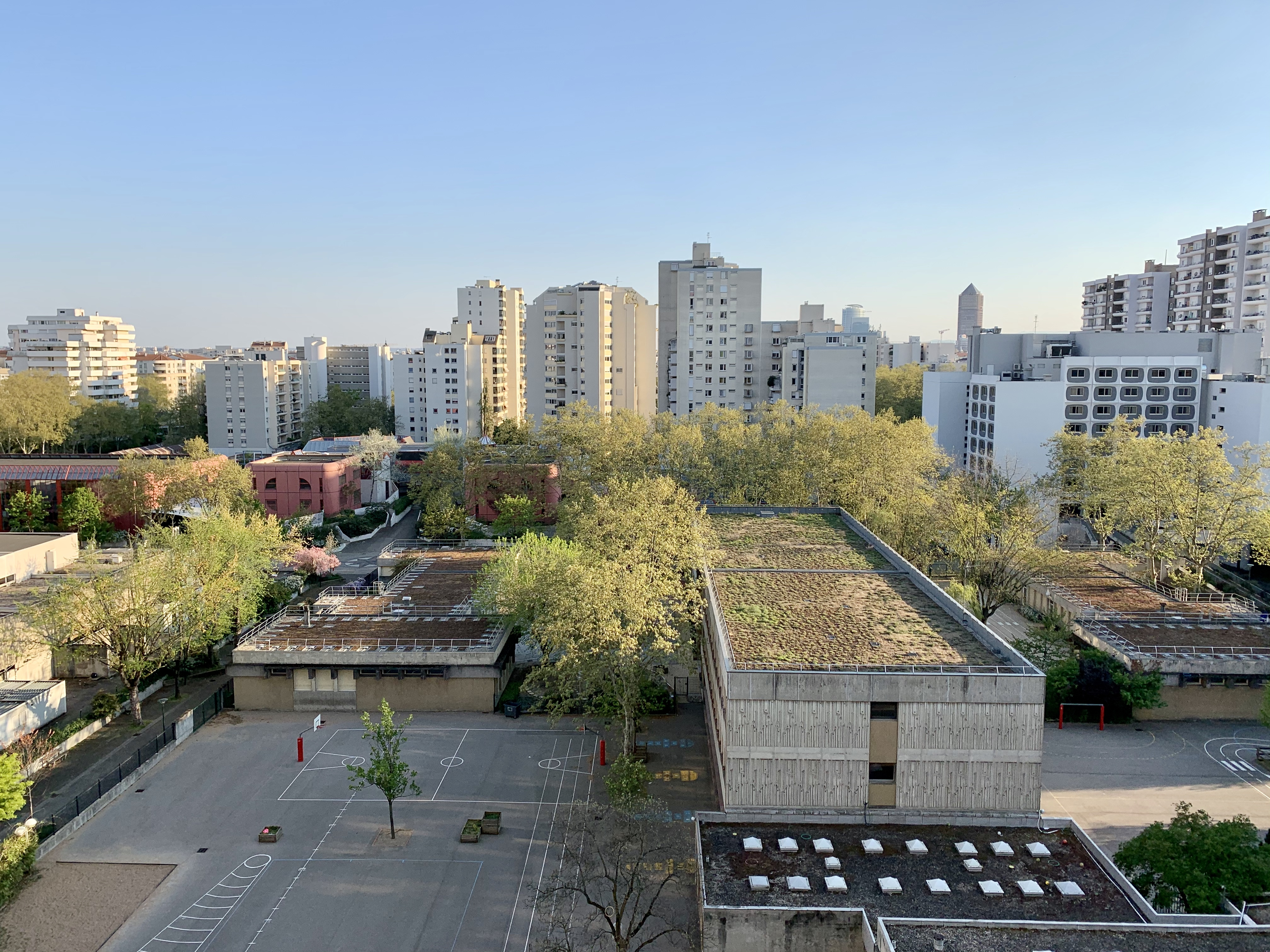
playground at Louis Armand Primary and Middle School

Public junior high schools

- Collège Louis Jouvet
- Collège Jean Jaurès

Public senior high schools

- Lycée Faÿs
- Lycée Alfred de Musset
- Lycée Marie Curie Villeurbanne
- Lycée Pierre Brossolette
- Lycée Magenta

Private schools:

- Institution Scolaire Immaculée Conception is a private school from elementary to high school/sixth-form with three campuses, two elementary and one secondary.
- École Beth Menahem (a Jewish school from preschool to senior high/sixth-form)

=== Colleges and universities ===
Many colleges and universities of the Lyon metropolitan area are located in Villeurbanne. Many of these are located on the La Doua campus, home to the Claude Bernard University (Lyon I), a public university, CPE Lyon and the Institut National des Sciences Appliquées de Lyon, one of the premier engineering institute (Grandes écoles) in France, very well known for high quality education and for research in France.

=== Weekend schools ===
The Association Pour le Developpement de la Langue et de la Culture Japonaises (ADLCJ; リヨン補習授業校 Riyon Hoshū Jugyō Kō), a part-time Japanese supplementary school, is held in the Maison Berty Albrecht in Villeurbanne. It was formed in 1987.

== Transport ==
Villeurbanne is well served by the Lyon area public transit system, the TCL (Transports en Commun Lyonnais). The east branch of subway line A runs through the city heart, and the new tramway lines T1 and T4 connects the La Doua campus to the Lyon business and commercial district of La Part-Dieu and the Presqu'île downtown.

== Twin towns – sister cities ==
Villeurbanne is twinned with:

- Abanilla, Spain
- Abovyan, Armenia
- Bat Yam, Israel
- Mogilev, Belarus

In addition, Villeurbanne has a friendship declaration with:

- Stepanakert, Republic of Artsakh

== Demographics ==
Historical population

Year	Pop.	±% p.a.
1793	1,617	—
1800	1,654	+0.32%
1806	1,834	+1.74%
1821	2,136	+1.02%
1831	2,826	+2.84%
1836	2,998	+1.19%
1841	3,677	+4.17%
1846	4,252	+2.95%
1851	5,395	+4.88%
1856	5,339	−0.21%
1861	5,850	+1.84%
1866	6,663	+2.64%
1872	7,474	+1.93%
1876	9,033	+4.85%
1881	11,176	+4.35%
1886	14,715	+5.66%
1891	17,940	+4.04%
1896	21,714	+3.89%
1901	29,220	+6.12%

Year	Pop.	±% p.a.
1906	33,890	+3.01%
1911	42,526	+4.64%
1921	56,110	+2.81%
1926	63,775	+2.59%
1931	82,038	+5.17%
1936	81,322	−0.18%
1946	82,399	+0.13%
1954	81,769	−0.10%
1962	105,416	+3.23%
1968	119,879	+2.17%
1975	116,535	−0.40%
1982	115,960	−0.07%
1990	116,872	+0.10%
1999	124,215	+0.68%
2007	138,151	+1.34%
2012	146,282	+1.15%
2017	147,712	+0.19%
2023	163,684	+1.73%

From 1962, the number here is the population without double counting
Source: EHESS and INSEE (since 1968)

In terms of population, Villeurbanne is the second largest city in the Metropolis of Lyon, the third largest in the Auvergne-Rhône-Alpes region, and the 16th largest in France.

== Notable people ==
- Bradley Barcola (born 2002), footballer
- Henry Bertrand, silk weaver
- Henri Cochet (1901–1987), tennis player
- Charles Hernu (1923–1990), politician, mayor of Villeurbanne (1977–1990)
- Sébastien Philippe (born 1975), racing driver and team principal of ART Grand Prix
- Mourad Benhamida (born 1986), footballer
- Laure Manaudou (born 1986), swimmer, world record holder
- Jean-Karl Vernay (born 1987), race car driver
- Florent Manaudou (born 1990), swimmer
- Gnonsiane Niombla (born 1990), handball player
- Xavier Chavalerin (born 1991), footballer
- Amos Youga (born 1992), footballer
- Willem Geubbels (born 2001), footballer

== See also ==
- Communes of the Metropolis of Lyon
