= Dave Donley =

American politician

Member of the Alaska Senate from the J district (Midtown Anchorage)
- In office January 11, 1993 – January 21, 2003
- Preceded by: Pat Rodey
- Succeeded by: Hollis French

Member of the Alaska House of Representatives from district 11A (Spenard)
- In office January 20, 1987 – January 11, 1993
- Preceded by: Roger Jenkins
- Succeeded by: Jim Nordlund

Personal details
- Born: August 29, 1954 (age 71) Anchorage, Alaska
- Party: Republican
- Other political affiliations: Democratic (before 1997)

Dave Donley (born August 29, 1954 in Anchorage, Alaska) is an American politician and attorney who served in the Alaska House of Representatives from District 11A Spenard from 1987 to 1993 and in the Alaska Senate from District J Midtown Anchorage from 1993 to 2003. He was elected to the Anchorage School Board in 2017 and re-elected in 2020 and 2023.

In the 2020 and 2023 Anchorage Municipal Elections he received more votes than any other municipal candidate. He graduated from Dimond High School in Anchorage in 1972, University of Oregon with a BS in political science in 1976 (Phi Beta Kappa), and University of Washington Law School with a Juris Doctor Degree in 1979. He passed the Alaska Bar Exam his first attempt and was admitted to the Alaska Bar Association in 1979. He qualified for membership in Mensa (IQ is in the top 2% of the population) and was admitted June, 1986. He was Certified as an Arbitrator for Better Business Bureau in 2006.

In the State House he served as House Labor and Commerce Chair twice and Judiciary Committee Chair. In the State Senate he served on the Senate Finance Committee, holding roles as Co-chair and Vice Chair. As a state legislator, Senator Donley authored over 80 legislative acts and was a leading advocate for crime victim’s rights, consumer protection, improved Anchorage roads, public education reform, anti-crime legislation, equal pay for women, and authored the 1998 State Constitutional Amendment for Alaska Hire.

From 2003 to 2008 he served as Chief of Adjudications and Hearing Officer for the State of Alaska. He was commissioned in the Alaska State Defense Force as a state military officer in 2008, rising to the rank of colonel in 2019. He served as a JAG officer, Deputy Commander, and Staff Judge Advocate in the ASDF.

In 2019, he was appointed Deputy Commissioner of the Alaska State Department of Administration. As Deputy Commissioner he, among other agencies, oversaw the Office of Administrative Hearings, Office of Public Advocacy, Public Defender Agency, Division of Risk Management, Division of Retirement and Benefits, and Division of Motor Vehicles. He served as the Commissioner's Designee on the Alaska State Bond Commission, the Student Loan Committee, and the State Emergency Response Commission. He additionally administered the Alaska Rural Communications System (ARCS) a system providing over the air television and public radio programing to over 100 rural communities via satellite.

He joined Laborers Local 341 in 1974 and worked as a logger, firefighter, and construction worker on the Alaska Pipeline Project. He served as Auditor, Training School Instructor, Election Judge, Organizer, Executive Board Member, and Recording Secretary before retiring from Local 341 in 2007.

From 2002 to 2024 at Anchorage's "Thursday Night at the Fights," he has been a judge of club boxing and martial arts contests. During those years he judged over 1,800 boxing matches and, 150 mixed martial arts and "Muay Thai" fights.

He was an Alaska Delegate to the 2016 Republican National Convention where during the vote for the Presidential Nomination he objected to the refusal of the Convention Staff to count the Alaska votes as they were cast by the Alaska Delegation.
