= Cédric Van Styvendael =

French politician (born 1973)

Mayor of Villeurbanne
- Incumbent
- Assumed office 4 July 2020
- Preceded by: Jean-Paul Bret

Personal details
- Born: 15 October 1973 (age 52)
- Party: Socialist Party

Cédric Van Styvendael (born 15 October 1973) is a French politician serving as mayor of Villeurbanne since 2020. He concurrently serves as vice president for culture of the Metropolitan Council of Lyon since 2020. Ahead of the 2022 presidential election, he served as a spokesperson for Anne Hidalgo.
