= 2026 Knox County, Tennessee mayoral election =

Mayoral Election of Knox County

2026 Knox County mayoral election
- August 6, 2026
Candidate	Betsy Henderson	Beau Hawk
Party	Republican	Democratic
Popular vote	46,207	41,853
Percentage	52.47%	47.53%
- Results by Precinct; Hawk: 50–60% 60–70% 70–80% 80–90% >90% Henderson: 50–60% 60–70% 70–80% 80–90% No votes
Mayor before election
Glenn Jacobs
Republican
Elected Mayor
Betsy Henderson
Republican

An election was held on August 6, 2026, to determine the mayor of Knox County, Tennessee. The election was held concurrently with primary elections for various state offices, including the gubernatorial primaries. Incumbent Republican mayor Glenn Jacobs was term-limited and could not run for reelection. Republican Chair of the Knox County Board of Education Betsy Henderson won the election with 52.47% of the vote against Democrat Beau Hawk.

== Republican primary ==
=== Candidates ===
Nominee

- Betsy Henderson, Chair of the Knox County Board of Education

Eliminated in primary

- Larsen Jay, Knox County Commissioner at-large
- Kim Frazier, Knox County Commissioner at-large

Republican primary results
Party	Candidate	Votes	%
Republican	Betsy Henderson	20,071	44.73%
Republican	Larsen Jay	13,981	31.15%
Republican	Kim Frazier	10,824	24.12%
Total votes		44,876	100.00%

== Democratic primary ==
=== Candidates ===
Nominee

- Beau Hawk, labor union leader and president of the Knoxville-Oak Ridge Central Labor Council

Democratic primary results
Party	Candidate	Votes	%
Democratic	Beau Hawk	9,952	100.00%
Total votes		9,952	100.00%

== General election ==
General election results
Party	Candidate	Votes	%
Republican	Betsy Henderson	46,207	52.47
Democratic	Beau Hawk	41,853	47.53
Total votes		88,060	100.0
