= 2026 United Kingdom electoral calendar =

2026 elections in the United Kingdom

This is a list of elections in the United Kingdom scheduled to be held in 2026. Included are local elections, by-elections, referendums and internal party elections.

== January ==
- 6–8 January: Lord Speaker, election
- 15 January:
  - Local by-election in Bridgemary for Gosport Borough Council is won by Reform UK.
  - Local by-election in Heworth for City of York Council is won by Labour. This means Labour retain control of the council.
- 20 January:
  - Local by-election in Codnor, Langley Mill & Aldercard for Amber Valley Borough Council.
  - Local by-election in Horsley for Derbyshire County Council.
- 22 January:
  - Scottish local by-election in Glenrothes West and Kinglassie.
  - local by-election Cheshire West and Chester – Willaston & Thornton
  - local by-election Cotswolds – The Rissingtons
  - local by-election Flintshire – Leeswood
  - local by-election South Norfolk – Central Wymondham
- 29 January: Scottish local by-election in Bearsden South.
- 31 January: Ulster Unionist Party, leadership election.

== February ==
- 5 February:
  - local by-election North Somerset – Clevedon South
  - local by-election Isle of Anglesey – Ynys Gybi
- 16-22 February: St Andrews Chancellor, election
- 26 February: Gorton and Denton, by-election

== May ==
- 7 May: Local Elections
  - England
    - London, local elections
  - Scotland, Parliament
  - Wales, Senedd

== June ==
- 18 June:
  - Aberdeen South, by-election
  - Arbroath and Broughty Ferry, by-election
  - Makerfield, by-election

== July ==
- 2 July:
  - local by-election Bournemouth, Christchurch and Poole – St Leonards and St Ives
  - Three wards in Powys
- 9–16 July: 2026 Labour Party leadership election
- 16 July:
  - 2026 Norfolk Police and Crime Commissioner by-election
  - local by-election Norfolk County Council, Old Catton division
  - local by-election Norwich City Council, Fletton and Woodston ward
  - local by-election Cambridgeshire County Council, Ramsey and Bury ward
- 30 July – 2026 Greater Manchester mayoral by-election

== August ==
- 13 August – Clacton, by-election

== October ==
- 8 October – Holborn and St Pancras, by-election

== December ==
- 2026 Wales Green Party leadership election

== See also ==
- 2026 in the United Kingdom
