= Bruno Bernard (politician) =

French politician (born 1970)

President of the Metropolis of Lyon
- In office 2 July 2020 – 26 March 2026
- Preceded by: David Kimelfeld
- Succeeded by: Véronique Sarselli

Personal details
- Born: 31 December 1970 (age 55)
- Party: The Ecologists (since 2020)
- Parent: Roland Bernard (father)

Bruno Bernard (born 31 December 1970) is a French politician serving as president of the Metropolis of Lyon from 2020 to 2026. He is the son of Roland Bernard.
