= April 2026 New Zealand National Party leadership election =

Leadership vote that occurred in the National caucus room in April 2026

- 21 April 2026

49 New Zealand National Party members of the New Zealand Parliament 25 members needed to win
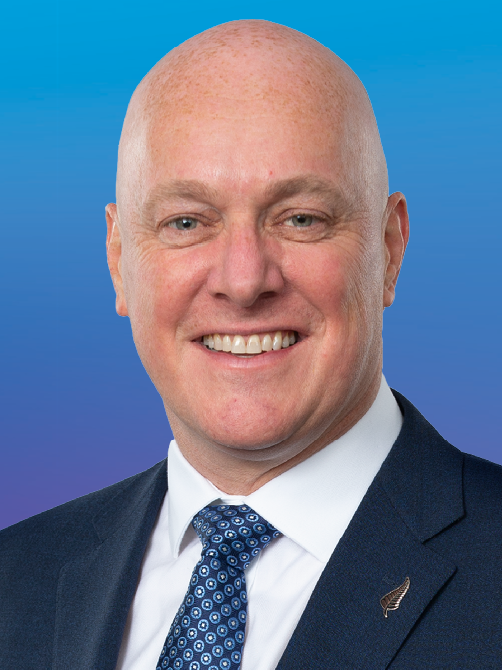

Candidate	Christopher Luxon	No confidence
Caucus vote	≥25	<25
Leader before election
Christopher Luxon
Leader after election
Christopher Luxon

On 21 April 2026, New Zealand Prime Minister Christopher Luxon called a motion of no confidence vote in himself as a test of his caucus' confidence in him as leader of the New Zealand National Party. Luxon won the no-confidence vote; the exact numbers have not been divulged by the party. A second vote was held almost three months later.

== Background ==
Luxon had been facing ongoing scrutiny of his leadership as well as low personal approval ratings in opinion polls. With polling not improving, cabinet minister Chris Bishop was rumoured to have been planning for a leadership challenge in November 2025, though he explicitly denied doing so. Another cabinet minister, Erica Stanford, also denied rumours she wanted to replace Luxon. A cabinet reshuffle in early April 2026 Bishop was given the position of Attorney-General but stripped of the prominent roles of Leader of the House and the National Party's campaign chair. Though denied by both Luxon and Bishop, this was widely interpreted by media and political commentators as a demotion linked to prior leadership tensions. Luxon attributed the positional change as due to workload and denied any connection to challenge rumours.

A further sharp decline in polls for both Luxon and National, linked to economic concerns, had been building for months as a topic of media attention. A 1News-Verian poll released on 20 April 2026 showed National support falling (to about 30% – 8% less than the previous election) and Luxon's preferred-prime-minister rating dropping to 16%. It indicated the governing coalition would lose if an election were held then. During this period Luxon was being advised by his friend and mentor, former Prime Minister Sir John Key, who publicly supported him amid the leadership speculation.

Alongside the polling slide, media reports of unrest among MPs emerged. The New Zealand Herald published a front-page story alleging that Stuart Smith, National's senior whip, had attempted to contact Luxon before Easter to raise concerns about flagging caucus support. There were also reports of disgruntled backbenchers (Luxon referenced roughly five "moaning and frustrated" MPs in response to reporting) who were behind recent leaks suggesting some MPs wanted a leadership change. Co-host of the show Breakfast, Tova O'Brien, was reported to have been in contact with a National MP who had told her that the numbers were probably there to remove Luxon from the leadership. The MP also told O'Brien their preference was for Luxon to step down rather than for him to be challenged.

== Result ==
Luxon remained the National Party leader after the party's caucus voted in support of him following Luxon raising a formal motion of confidence during a three-hour caucus meeting. Votes in the National Party caucus room aren't publicly released, but during a later leadership challenge National MPs estimated that the vote was 27 to 22. Smith was absent from the meeting who, as senior whip, would have normally been one of the scrutineers in any caucus vote. Junior whip Suze Redmayne deputised for him. She withheld the precise result, as is normal in the National Party, but did confirm she personally had cast her vote in support of Luxon. The other scrutineer was party president Sylvia Wood.

After the confidence vote, Luxon spoke for just over two minutes in the parliamentary banquet hall, stating:

To put that media speculation to rest, I moved a formal motion of confidence in my leadership.

That motion was passed, confirming what I have been saying – I have the support of my caucus as their leader.

– Christopher Luxon

After finishing his prepared statement, Luxon declared the matter "now closed" and told media that if they "want to keep focusing on speculation and rumour, I'm not going to engage". He also described the interest around his leadership as a "media soap opera" and ended the brief speech by leaving without taking any questions.

== Aftermath ==
National's polling continued to decline. By mid-July National had fallen 2.1 points to 28.7 percent in the RNZ-Reid Research poll, its fourth consecutive decline and lowest result since November 2021 when Luxon became the party leader. Consequently, he would face another leadership election in August 2026, less than 3-months before the 2026 New Zealand general election.
