= August 2026 New Zealand National Party leadership election =

Political party election in New Zealand

- 12 August 2026

49 New Zealand National Party members of the New Zealand Parliament 25 members needed to win
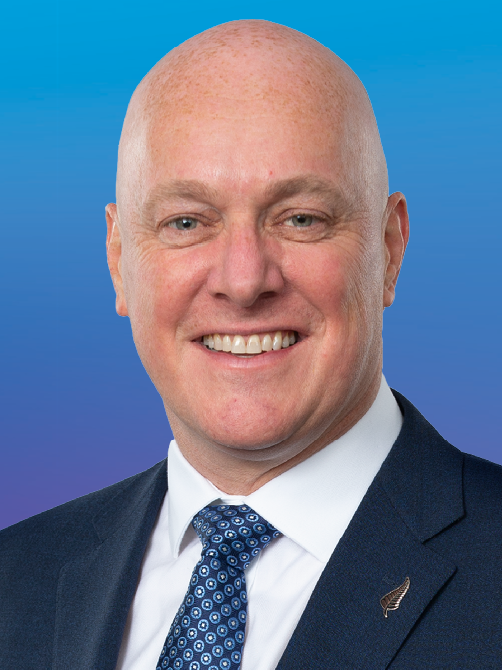

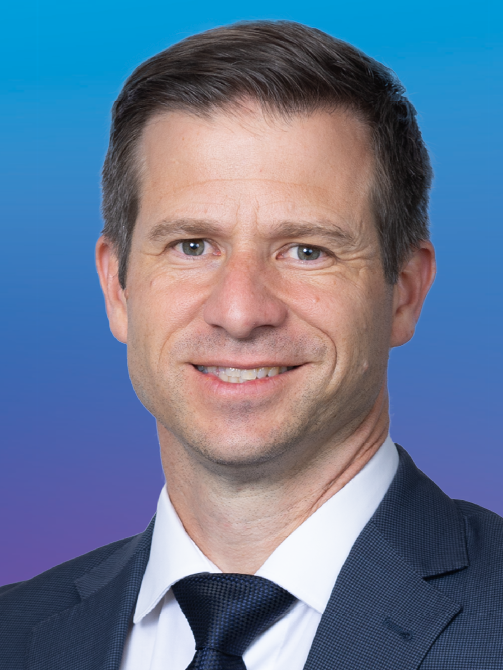
Candidate	Christopher Luxon	Chris Penk
Caucus vote	≥25	<25
Leader before election
Christopher Luxon
Elected Leader
Christopher Luxon

An emergency meeting of the New Zealand National Party caucus was held on the morning of 12 August 2026 to confirm caucus' confidence in party leader and incumbent Prime Minister Christopher Luxon.

The meeting was called after renewed speculation of a challenge to Luxon. After more than two hours of discussion, Luxon emerged as the winner by an unknown margin. He defeated the only candidate, Chris Penk. The exact vote breakdown has not been publicly released, being known only by two anonymous National MPs.

This was the second National Party leadership vote of confidence in four months, the previous one having been called by Luxon on 21 April, which he won. Erica Stanford, the minister of education and immigration and rumoured contender, failed to materialise as a candidate.

== Background ==
Luxon has faced repeated scrutiny of his leadership of the New Zealand National Party and low personal approval ratings. Amid considerably poor polling for the party, Chris Bishop (Leader of the House and Attorney-General) was rumoured to be plotting a leadership challenge in November 2025, but explicitly denied doing so. Erica Stanford (Minister of Education and Minister of Immigration) also denied rumours she could be a contender.

Luxon's leadership continued to face scrutiny in April 2026. This caused him to call a confidence vote in himself on 21 April 2026, which he won by an unspecified number. The numbers were widely rumoured in the media to have been 27–22 in favour of Luxon. National continued to experience poll decline, and Luxon's personal popularity also suffered. A June 2026 Reid Research poll placed National at 28.7%, its fourth consecutive decline in Reid Research's polling and the lowest result since he was elected leader in November 2021.

The caucus meeting and vote on 12 August came after Luxon was perceived to have made several communication mistakes. Shortly before the emergency meeting in August, 1News reported new dissatisfaction with his leadership among MPs, stemming from Luxon making several "gaffes"; these included Luxon announcing new fuel excise, bed and bank taxes should National return to power in the upcoming general election in November. Luxon had also apologised for comments he made to business leaders at a Rotorua Business Chamber function, after he claimed they had a "parent-child mentality" with the central government and demanded they "be adult, adult, adult". BBC News linked this to his radio pledge to hold another referendum on New Zealand's mixed-member proportional election system, a so-called "Captain's Call" without consultation from his National party colleagues. Luxon went as far as not only to pledge support for the referendum, but declare it should happen as soon as 2027. Luxon then faced scrutiny after using a New Zealand Defence Force jet to fly him home from a National Party fundraising dinner.

== Caucus meeting ==
On 11 August 2026, The New Zealand Herald reported that National Party MPs were making calls about a change in leadership. One MP claimed "there's going to be change in the top job. It's just a question of who is going to be it". Luxon announced that evening an emergency caucus meeting would be held in Wellington at 9:30 a.m. the next day. The fact it was a non-sitting week meant that National MPs had to travel into Wellington abruptly that night or early the next morning; members of the media confronted several MPs arriving at Wellington Airport.

Several MPs, such as Joseph Mooney and Scott Simpson, explicitly voiced support for Luxon, whereas other MPs speculated to be unhappy with his leadership refused to. These included Erica Stanford and Simon Watts (Minister of Revenue), the former refusing to confirm her support when ambushed by journalists at the airport. Both are MPs from Auckland, a region which Newsroom has argued is pivotal for a prospective National leader to win.

A new poll suggested Chris Bishop was narrowly the most popular choice to replace Luxon, but Bishop has repeatedly ruled himself out since the November 2025 speculations. The Spinoff similarly claimed that any prospective candidate would have to appeal to Pākehā women in their 50s, the most likely swing voter in the 2023 New Zealand general election.

The meeting began at 9:30 a.m. and continued for over two hours, during which time Luxon raised another formal motion of confidence in himself. After emerging from the caucus room, Luxon was flanked by many of his senior ministers, and issued a brief 57-second-long statement: "There was a confidence vote in my leadership this morning at our caucus meeting, and I have the full support of our caucus. And our caucus is united, and it is determined to win this election."

== Aftermath ==
It emerged that during the meeting Chris Penk (Minister of Defence and for the Government Communications Security Bureau) had launched a challenge to Luxon. Chris Bishop claimed he was "pretty annoyed" at "completely unfounded" rumours that he had been backing Penk. Luxon subsequently purged Penk, stripping him of all his ministerial portfolios. Penk then announced he would not seek re-election as Member for Kaipara ki Mahurangi.

On 13 August, Erica Stanford released a statement clarifying her "full support" of Luxon.
