= Mark Pettway =

American law enforcement officer

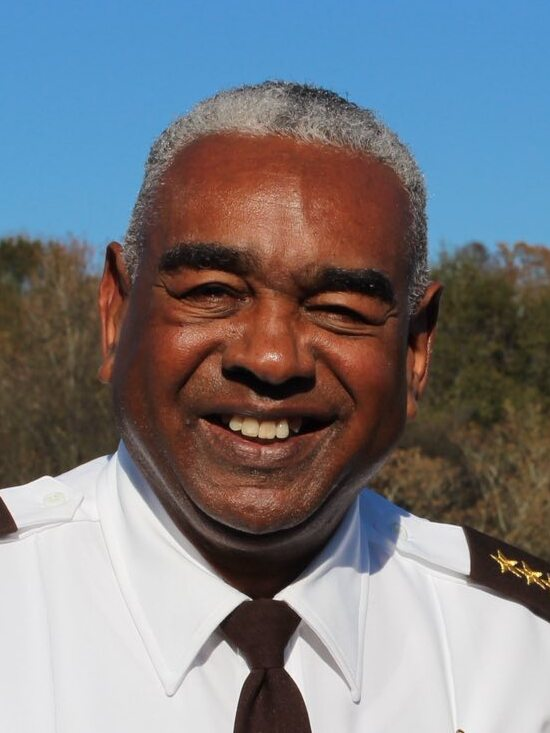
- Pettway in 2025

Sheriff of Jefferson County, Alabama
- Incumbent
- Assumed office January 11, 2019
- Preceded by: Mike Hale

Personal details
- Born: January 22, 1964 (age 62) Birmingham, Alabama
- Party: Democratic
- Education: Faulkner University

Mark Levie Pettway (born January 22, 1964) is an American law enforcement officer who has served as the sheriff of Jefferson County, Alabama, since 2019. He is a member of the Alabama Democratic Party.

== Early life and career ==
Pettway grew up in Birmingham, Alabama, where he attended Ensley High School. He graduated from Faulkner University with a degree in business administration. After high school, he joined the Birmingham Police Department in 1991. Pettway first joined the Jefferson County Sheriff's Office in 1999. In 2008, he was promoted to the detective bureau, where he worked until 2018.

== Jefferson County Sheriff ==
=== Elections ===
==== 2018 ====
In 2018, Pettway announced that he would run against incumbent Republican sheriff Mike Hale. In the Democratic primary, he received 42% of the vote and advanced to a runoff election against Wilson Hale. He defeated Wilson Hale in the runoff on July 17. In his campaign, Pettway stated that he favored the use of police body cameras to help reduce crime. He defeated Mike Hale in the general election on November 6, receiving 51% of the vote.

==== 2022 ====
Pettway ran for re-election to a second term in 2022. He won the Democratic primary against three opponents with over 75% of the vote. Facing Republican nominee Jared Hudson in the general election, Pettway stated that violent crime in the unincorporated areas of the county was down by over 10%. He defeated Hudson on November 8, with 52% of the vote.

==== 2026 ====
Pettway defeated two candidates in the Democratic primary on May 19, again receiving over 75% of the vote.

=== Tenure ===
Pettway was sworn in on January 11, 2019, in front of over 1,000 attendees at a local church. In his first term, Pettway installed a deputy at every school in the county. He also worked with the county jail on a Renewed for Reentry Program, which worked to make inmates employable upon their release. When outlining his plans for 2024, Pettway said that he was focused on keeping teenagers out of danger, as well as expanding mental health response services.
