= 2022 Michigan Secretary of State election =

- November 8, 2022
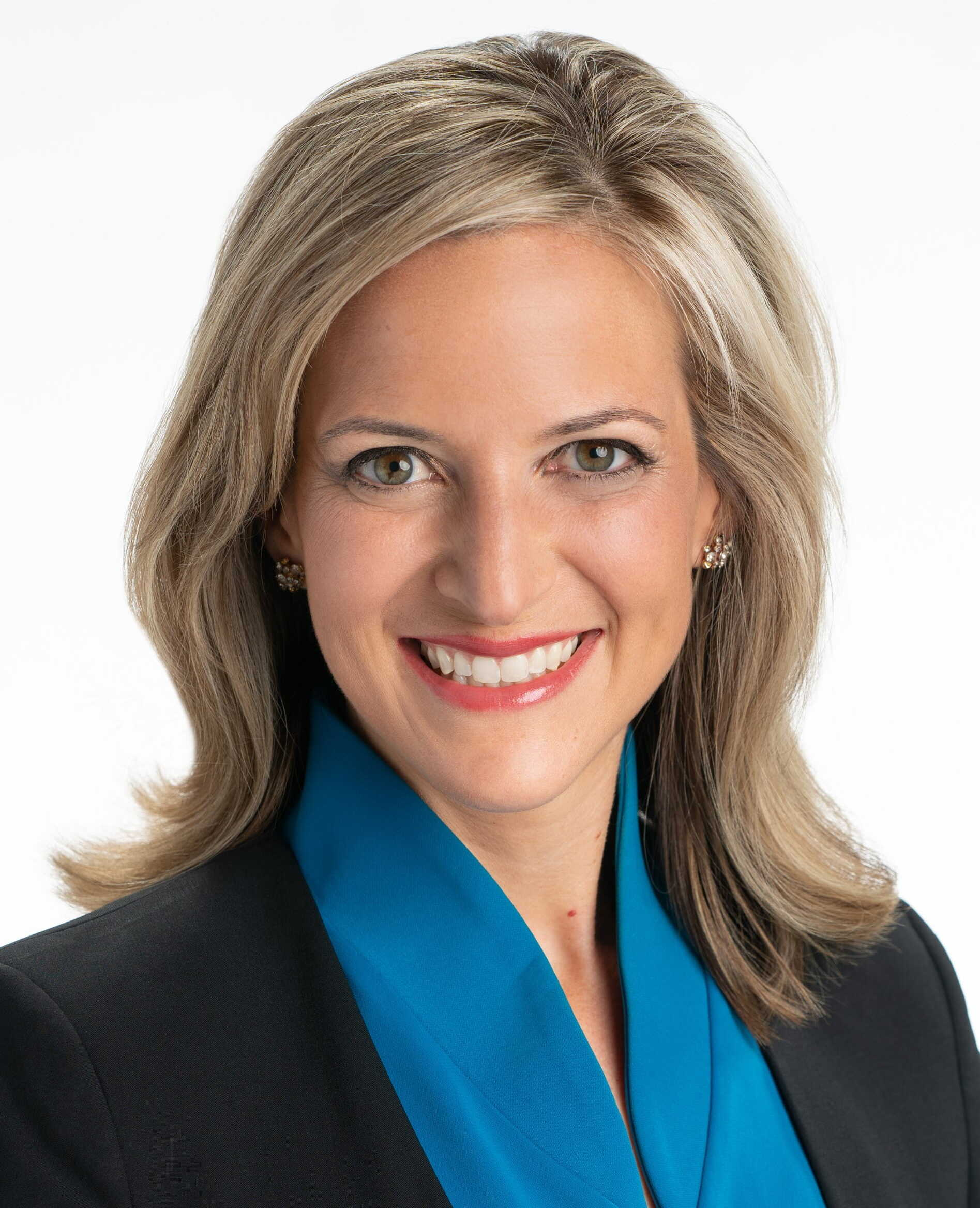

Nominee	Jocelyn Benson	Kristina Karamo
Party	Democratic	Republican
Popular vote	2,467,859	1,852,510
Percentage	55.86%	41.93%
- Benson: 40–50% 50–60% 60–70% 70–80% 80–90% >90% Karamo: 40–50% 50–60% 60–70% 70–80% 80–90% Tie
Secretary of State before election
Jocelyn Benson
Democratic
Elected Secretary of State
Jocelyn Benson
Democratic

The 2022 Michigan Secretary of State election was held on November 8, 2022, to elect the Secretary of State of Michigan. Incumbent Democrat Jocelyn Benson decisively won reelection to a second term, defeating Republican Kristina Karamo by a nearly 14 percentage point margin.

Michigan does not hold partisan primaries for statewide offices other than governor. Instead, the state parties hold conventions in August to nominate candidates for the general election. Party nomination conventions were held on April 9 for the Michigan Democratic Party and April 23 for the Michigan Republican Party.

Some analysts originally predicted for the race to be competitive, especially during the final days, but Benson's performance seemingly outperformed the polls following the election. The results held the largest margin in the 2022 state elections, as well as the worst performance by Republican candidate in a Secretary of State election since 1990. It was also the first time since 1990 where a Democratic candidate won re-election.

== Background ==
The position of secretary of state of Michigan is responsible for overseeing elections in the state. Benson, a Democrat, was first elected to the position in 2018. She received national attention in her position following Joe Biden's victory in the state in the 2020 presidential election. Donald Trump's campaign contested Biden's victory in Michigan and filed a lawsuit over the counting of absentee ballots.

The race for Michigan secretary of state in 2022 received national attention over its potential impact on how the state would oversee the 2024 presidential election there.

== Democratic convention ==
=== Candidates ===
==== Nominee ====
- Jocelyn Benson, incumbent secretary of state

=== Endorsements ===
Jocelyn Benson

Labor unions

- American Federation of State, County and Municipal Employees Council 25
- American Federation of Teachers
- United Auto Workers

Political parties

- Michigan Democratic Party

== Republican convention ==
=== Candidates ===
==== Nominee ====
- Kristina Karamo, activist and educator

==== Eliminated at convention ====
- Cindy Berry, Chesterfield Township clerk
- Beau LaFave, member of the Michigan House of Representatives from the 108th district
- Cathleen Postmus, Plainfield Township clerk

==== Declined ====
- Ann Bollin, member of the Michigan House of Representatives from the 42nd district
- Meghan Reckling, Livingston County Republican Party chair

=== Endorsements ===
Kristina Karamo

Executive officials

- Donald Trump, 45th president of the United States (2017–2021)

State officials

- Ruth Johnson, former Michigan secretary of state

Organizations

- Michigan Republican Party

== General election ==
=== Predictions ===
Source	Ranking	As of
Sabato's Crystal Ball	Leans D	November 3, 2022
Elections Daily	Likely D	November 7, 2022

=== Post-convention endorsements ===
Jocelyn Benson (D)

Executive officials

- Barack Obama, 44th president of the United States (2009–2017)

U.S. representatives

- Adam Kinzinger, IL-16 (2011–2023) (Republican)

Organizations

- Human Rights Campaign
- National Wildlife Federation

Newspapers

- Detroit Free Press
- The Michigan Daily
Kristina Karamo (R)

Organizations

- America First Secretary of State Coalition

=== Polling ===
Graphical summary

Poll source	Date(s) administered	Sample size (Note: Key: A – all adults RV – registered voters LV – likely voters V – unclear)	Margin of error	Jocelyn Benson (D)	Kristina Karamo (R)	Other	Undecided
Cygnal (R)	November 1–4, 2022	1,603 (LV)	± 2.5%	49%	44%	2% (Note: "Third party candidate" with 2%)	6%
Mitchell Research	November 3, 2022	658 (LV)	± 3.8%	51%	40%	2% (Note: "Another candidate" with 2%)	7%
Cygnal (R)	October 31 – November 2, 2022	1,754 (LV)	± 2.3%	49%	42%	3% (Note: "Third party candidate" with 3%)	6%
EPIC-MRA	October 28 – November 1, 2022	600 (LV)	± 4.0%	50%	41%	3% (Note: Hutchinson (G) with 1%; Schwartz (UTP) with 1%; Stempfle (L) with 1%)	6%
Cygnal (R)	October 27–31, 2022	1,584 (LV)	± 2.5%	50%	40%	3% (Note: "Third party candidate" with 3%)	7%
Cygnal (R)	October 25–29, 2022	1,543 (LV)	± 2.5%	50%	39%	3% (Note: "Third party candidate" with 3%)	8%
The Glengariff Group, Inc.	October 26–28, 2022	600 (LV)	± 4.0%	49%	39%	5%	7%
Cygnal (R)	October 23–27, 2022	1,822 (LV)	± 2.3%	49%	41%	3% (Note: "Third party candidate" with 3%)	8%
Cygnal (R)	October 21–25, 2022	1,378 (LV)	± 2.6%	50%	40%	3% (Note: "Third party candidate" with 3%)	8%
Cygnal (R)	October 19–23, 2022	1,459 (LV)	± 2.6%	48%	41%	3% (Note: "Third party candidate" with 3%)	8%
Cygnal (R)	October 17–21, 2022	1,904 (LV)	± 2.3%	49%	39%	3% (Note: "Third party candidate" with 3%)	9%
Mitchell Research	October 19, 2022	541 (LV)	± 4.2%	49%	40%	2% (Note: "Another candidate" with 2%)	9%
Cygnal (R)	October 15–19, 2022	1,793 (LV)	± 2.3%	48%	40%	4% (Note: "Third party candidate" with 4%)	9%
CNN/SSRS	October 13–18, 2022	901 (RV)	± 4.2%	54%	41%	5% (Note: "Neither" with 3%; "Other with 2%)	1%
CNN/SSRS	October 13–18, 2022	651 (LV)	± 4.9%	51%	47%	1% (Note: "Neither" with 1%)	–
Cygnal (R) (Note: This poll was sponsored by the Michigan Association of Broadcasters)	October 12–14, 2022	640 (LV)	± 3.9%	48%	42%	3% (Note: "Third party candidate" with 3%)	7%
EPIC-MRA	October 6–12, 2022	600 (LV)	± 4.0%	47%	37%	4% (Note: Stempfle (L) with 2%; Schwartz (UTP) with 1%; Hutchinson (G) with 1%)	12%
The Glengariff Group, Inc.	September 26–29, 2022	600 (LV)	± 4.0%	47%	29%	8% (Note: Stempfle with 4%; Hutchinson Jr. with 3%; Schwartz with 1%)	14%
The Trafalgar Group (R)	September 24–28, 2022	1,075 (LV)	± 2.9%	50%	45%	4% (Note: Stempfle (L) and "Other" with 2%)	2%
EPIC-MRA (Note: Poll conducted for WJRT-TV and the Detroit Free Press.)	September 15–19, 2022	600 (LV)	± 4.0%	51%	37%	–	12%
EPIC-MRA (Note: Poll conducted for MIRS, Governmental Consultant Services Inc., and the Life Insurance Association of Michigan.)	September 7–13, 2022	800 (LV)	± 3.5%	48%	40%	7% (Note: "Third party candidate" with 7%)	5%
EPIC-MRA	August 18–23, 2022	600 (LV)	± 4.0%	44%	38%	–	18%
The Glengariff Group, Inc.	July 5–8, 2022	600 (LV)	± 4.0%	46%	39%	–	15%
Target Insyght	May 26–27, 2022	600 (RV)	± 4.0%	56%	23%	–	22%
EPIC-MRA	May 11–17, 2022	600 (LV)	± 4.0%	47%	38%	–	15%
The Glengariff Group, Inc.	January 3–7, 2022	600 (LV)	± 4.0%	46%	32%	–	22%

=== Results ===
2022 Michigan secretary of state election
Party	Candidate	Votes	%	±%
Democratic	Jocelyn Benson (incumbent)	2,467,859	55.86%	+2.96%
Republican	Kristina Karamo	1,852,510	41.93%	−2.05%
Libertarian	Gregory Scott Stempfle	52,982	1.20%	−0.76%
Constitution	Christine Schwartz	27,937	0.63%	−0.54%
Green	Larry James Hutchinson Jr.	16,615	0.38%	N/A
Total votes		4,417,903	100.00%	
Democratic hold				

==== By county ====
County	Jocelyn Benson; Democratic		Kristina Karamo; Republican		Other votes	
County	%	#	%	#	%	#
Alcona	34.5%	2,049	63.4%	3,765	2.2%	128
Alger	46.4%	1,982	51.7%	2,209	2.0%	85
Allegan	41.8%	23,777	55.8%	31,730	2.4%	1,357
Alpena	41.0%	5,679	56.5%	7,819	2.5%	343
Antrim	42.3%	5,892	55.8%	7,773	2.0%	273
Arenac	39.7%	2,827	57.2%	4,069	3.1%	218
Baraga	37.9%	1,303	60.1%	2,065	1.9%	66
Barry	39.8%	12,096	57.6%	16,539	2.6%	821
Bay	52.9%	25,733	44.4%	21,589	2.8%	1,339
Benzie	50.3%	5,352	47.9%	5,096	1.7%	185
Berrien	45.8%	29,086	52.0%	33,004	2.2%	1,425
Branch	36.3%	5,816	60.9%	9,752	2.7%	435
Calhoun	49.5%	25,341	47.9%	24,497	2.6%	1,411
Cass	35.4%	7,132	62.3%	12,560	2.4%	476
Charlevoix	45.4%	6,629	52.5%	7,662	2.0%	298
Cheboygan	39.6%	5,240	58.1%	7,687	2.2%	293
Chippewa	43.5%	6,277	53.9%	7,774	2.6%	367
Clare	38.4%	5,031	59.1%	7,749	2.5%	321
Clinton	50.9%	20,722	47.1%	19,167	2.0%	799
Crawford	40.0%	2,590	57.4%	3,709	2.6%	168
Delta	40.4%	6,942	57.3%	9,848	2.3%	394
Dickinson	35.9%	4,276	62.1%	7,401	2.0%	233
Eaton	54.4%	28,891	43.4%	23,046	2.2%	1,148
Emmet	47.7%	9,087	50.3%	9,595	2.0%	386
Genesee	59.6%	101,391	38.1%	64,694	2.3%	3,731
Gladwin	39.0%	4,654	58.4%	6,964	2.6%	312
Gogebic	45.6%	2,917	52.0%	3,329	2.4%	151
Grand Traverse	52.4%	27,236	45.5%	23,655	2.0%	1,054
Gratiot	42.0%	6,394	55.1%	8,382	2.9%	448
Hillsdale	31.0%	5,740	66.4%	12,297	2.6%	477
Houghton	45.8%	7,024	51.9%	7,962	2.3%	360
Huron	38.7%	5,739	58.9%	8,747	2.4%	361
Ingham	69.0%	81,444	28.7%	33,886	2.3%	2,672
Ionia	42.3%	11,363	54.9%	14,747	2.8%	764
Iosco	42.7%	5,365	54.7%	6,864	2.6%	322
Iron	40.7%	2,284	57.4%	3,225	1.9%	108
Isabella	53.0%	12,555	44.5%	10,528	2.5%	587
Jackson	45.5%	29,197	51.9%	33,311	2.5%	1,635
Kalamazoo	62.8%	72,625	34.9%	40,394	2.3%	2,664
Kalkaska	33.7%	2,957	63.3%	5,553	3.1%	288
Kent	55.9%	166,403	41.9%	124,656	2.2%	6,396
Keweenaw	48.0%	665	50.1%	693	1.9%	26
Lake	39.8%	2,079	58.1%	3,033	2.1%	110
Lapeer	38.5%	16,688	58.1%	25,517	2.1%	1,196
Leelanau	55.4%	8,534	43.1%	6,633	1.5%	226
Lenawee	42.5%	17,976	55.0%	23,289	2.6%	1,080
Livingston	45.5%	49,060	52.2%	56,247	2.3%	2,444
Luce	32.9%	770	64.7%	1,515	2.4%	56
Mackinac	42.8%	2,542	55.3%	3,282	1.9%	115
Macomb	54.6%	207,115	43.2%	164,011	2.2%	8,387
Manistee	46.9%	5,887	50.8%	6,388	2.3%	289
Marquette	60.3%	18,743	37.4%	11,631	2.2%	596
Mason	43.0%	6,316	54.7%	8,033	2.3%	350
Mecosta	39.4%	6,856	58.0%	10,090	2.6%	449
Menominee	35.6%	3,411	62.1%	5,959	2.3%	220
Midland	48.6%	19,789	48.9%	19,927	2.5%	1,032
Missaukee	26.1%	1,934	71.4%	5,287	2.5%	186
Monroe	44.5%	30,284	53.0%	36,021	2.5%	1,771
Montcalm	38.6%	10,073	58.5%	15,263	2.9%	753
Montmorency	33.1%	1,686	64.5%	3,290	2.4%	121
Muskegon	56.1%	40,916	41.5%	30,275	2.4%	1,763
Newaygo	35.0%	7,907	62.3%	14,089	2.7%	621
Oakland	62.6%	390,707	35.5%	221,357	1.9%	11,574
Oceana	41.8%	5,010	55.6%	6,668	2.6%	308
Ogemaw	38.1%	3,727	59.4%	5,803	2.5%	241
Ontonagon	41.3%	1,337	56.5%	1,829	2.2%	72
Osceola	30.6%	3,157	67.0%	6,916	2.5%	253
Oscoda	32.4%	1,289	65.0%	2,581	2.6%	103
Otsego	38.1%	4,735	59.4%	7,374	2.4%	303
Ottawa	42.2%	61,240	55.9%	81,113	1.9%	3,701
Presque Isle	41.3%	2,997	56.6%	4,105	2.1%	153
Roscommon	40.7%	5,230	57.0%	7,314	2.3%	292
Saginaw	55.0%	44,376	42.7%	34,505	2.3%	1,855
Sanilac	34.6%	6,442	62.7%	11,663	2.7%	502
Schoolcraft	39.9%	1,538	57.8%	2,230	2.4%	91
Shiawassee	46.9%	15,038	50.5%	16,204	2.6%	844
St. Clair	43.2%	31,777	53.8%	39,522	3.0%	2,189
St. Joseph	38.9%	8,460	58.0%	12,607	3.0%	960
Tuscola	37.2%	8,865	60.0%	14,311	2.8%	670
Van Buren	49.2%	15,572	48.1%	15,219	2.7%	851
Washtenaw	76.0%	136,412	22.2%	39,847	1.8%	3,175
Wayne	72.0%	460,023	25.9%	165,585	2.0%	13,117
Wexford	37.7%	5,658	59.8%	8,985	2.5%	370
Totals	55.86%	2,467,859	41.93%	1,852,510	2.21%	97,534

Counties that flipped from Democratic to Republican

- Gogebic (largest city: Ironwood)

Counties that flipped from Republican to Democratic

- Benzie (largest city: Frankfort)
- Calhoun (largest city: Marshall)
- Clinton (largest city: St. Johns)
- Grand Traverse (largest city: Traverse City)
- Van Buren (largest city: South Haven)

==== By congressional district ====
Benson won nine of 13 congressional districts, including two that elected Republicans.

District	Benson	Karamo	Representative
1st	44%	53%	Jack Bergman
2nd	42%	56%	John Moolenaar
3rd	57%	41%	Peter Meijer (117th Congress)
3rd	57%	41%	Hillary Scholten (118th Congress)
4th	51%	47%	Bill Huizenga
5th	42%	56%	Tim Walberg
6th	68%	30%	Debbie Dingell
7th	55%	42%	Elissa Slotkin
8th	56%	41%	Dan Kildee
9th	43%	54%	Lisa McClain
10th	58%	40%	John James
11th	66%	32%	Haley Stevens
12th	76%	22%	Rashida Tlaib
13th	77%	21%	Shri Thanedar
