= 2018 Michigan Secretary of State election =

- November 6, 2018
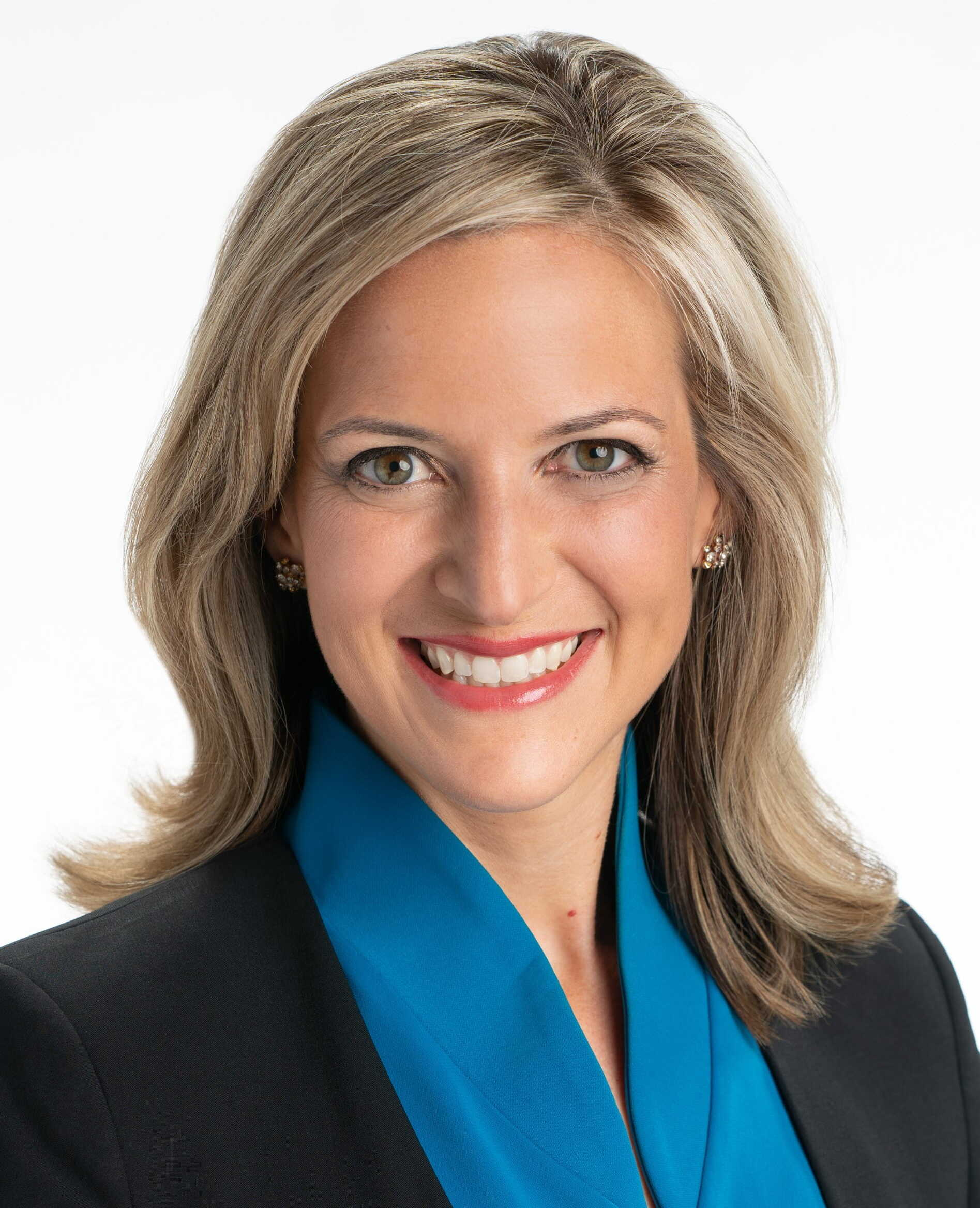

Nominee	Jocelyn Benson	Mary Treder Lang
Party	Democratic	Republican
Popular vote	2,213,243	1,840,118
Percentage	52.90%	43.98%
- Benson: 40–50% 50–60% 60–70% 70–80% 80–90% >90% Lang: 40–50% 50–60% 60–70% 70–80% 80–90% Tie: 40–50% No data
Secretary of State before election
Ruth Johnson
Republican
Elected Secretary of State
Jocelyn Benson
Democratic

The Michigan Secretary of State election of 2018 was held on November 6, 2018, to elect the secretary of state of Michigan. Democratic former university dean Jocelyn Benson won her first term in office, defeating Republican university vice chair Mary Treder Lang. Benson succeeded Republican incumbent Ruth Johnson, who was term limited and ineligible to seek a third term.

Treder Lang and Benson were selected as the respective party nominees through a convention.

== Republican convention ==
=== Candidates ===
==== Nominee ====
- Mary Treder Lang, vice chair of the Eastern Michigan University Board of Regents

==== Eliminated at convention ====
- Stan Grot, Shelby Township Clerk
- Joseph Guzman

==== Withdrew ====
- Mike Kowall, state senator

== Democratic convention ==
=== Candidates ===
==== Nominee ====
- Jocelyn Benson, former dean of Wayne State University Law School and nominee for Secretary of State in 2010

==== Declined ====
- Barbara Byrum, Ingham County clerk

== Minor parties ==
=== Libertarian Party ===
- Gregory Stempfle

== General election ==
=== Predictions ===
Source	Ranking	As of
Governing	Lean D (flip)	October 11, 2018

=== Post-primary endorsements ===
Mary Treder Leng (R)

U.S. representatives

- Bill Huizenga, MI-02 (2013–present)
- Candice Miller, former MI-10 (2003–2016)
- John Moolenaar, MI-04 (2015–present)
- Fred Upton, MI-06 (1987–2023)

Statewide officials

- Terri Lynn Land, former Michigan secretary of state (2003–2011)

State legislators

- 40 state legislators

Local officials

- L. Brooks Patterson, Oakland County executive (1993–2019)

Organizations

- Farm Bureau PAC
- National Federation of Independent Business Michigan
- National Right to Life Committee Michigan
Jocelyn Benson (D)

Executive branch officials

- Joe Biden, former vice president of the United States (2009–2017)
- Barbara McQuade, attorney for the eastern district of Michigan

U.S. senators

- Carl Levin, former Michigan (1979–2015)

U.S. representatives

- Sander Levin, MI-09 (1983–2019)

Statewide officials

- Kate Brown, governor of Oregon (2015–2023)
- 9 secretaries of state (Note: Jim Condos, Vermont secretary of state (2011–2023); Matthew Dunlap, Maine secretary of state (2005–2011, 2013–2021); Alison Lundergan Grimes, Kentucky secretary of state (2012–2020); Jason Kander, Missouri secretary of state (2013–2017); Maggie Toulouse Oliver, New Mexico secretary of state (2016–present); Alex Padilla, California secretary of state (2015–2021); Mark Ritchie, former Minnesota secretary of state (2007–2015); Steve Simon, Minnesota secretary of state (2015–present); Natalie Tennant, former West Virginia secretary of state (2009–2017))

State legislators

- Marilyn Lane, former HD-31 (2011–2017)
- 13 other state legislators

Local officials

- Dennis Archer Sr., former mayor of Detroit (1994–2002)
- Mike Duggan, mayor of Detroit (2014–2026)
- Mark Hackel, Macomb County executive (2011–present)
- Eric Smith, Macomb County prosecutor (2005–2020)

Labor unions

- American Federation of Teachers
- International Brotherhood of Teamsters
- Michigan AFL-CIO
- Michigan Education Association
- Michigan Regional Council of Carpenters and Millwrights
- United Auto Workers

Organizations

- EMILY's List
- Let America Vote
- Michigan College Democrats

Newspapers

- Detroit Free Press
- Lansing State Journal

=== Polling ===
Poll source	Date(s) administered	Sample size (Note: Key: A – all adults RV – registered voters LV – likely voters V – unclear)	Margin of error	Mary Treder Lang (R)	Jocelyn Benson (D)	Other	Undecided
Glengariff Group	October 25–27, 2018	600 (LV)	± 4.0%	34%	45%	4% (Note: Gale (UTP) with 2%; Stempfle (L) with 2%)	17%
EPIC-MRA	October 18–23, 2018	600 (LV)	± 4.0%	36%	40%	7% (Note: Stempfle (L) with 3%; "Other party candidate" with 4%)	17%
Marketing Resource Group	October 14–18, 2018	600 (LV)	± 4.0%	33%	41%	3% (Note: Stempfle (L) with 3%)	17%
Glengariff Group	September 30 – October 2, 2018	600 (LV)	± 4.0%	29%	41%	7%	23%
EPIC-MRA	September 21–25, 2018	600 (LV)	± 4.0%	31%	40%	10% (Note: "Other party candidate" with 10%; Stempfle (L) with 3%)	19%
Glengariff Group	September 5–7, 2018	600 (LV)	± 4.0%	29%	44%	5%	23%

=== Fundraising ===
Campaign finance reports as of October 21, 2018
Candidate	Raised	Spent	Cash on hand
Jocelyn Benson (D)	$1,420,090.57	$1,120,241.74	$306,333.15
Mary Treder Lang (R)	$671,165.36	$562,880.13	$108,285.23
Source: Michigan Department of State

=== Results ===
Michigan Secretary of State election, 2018
Party	Candidate	Votes	%	±%
Democratic	Jocelyn Benson	2,213,243	52.90%	+9.96%
Republican	Mary Treder Lang	1,840,118	43.98%	−9.55%
Libertarian	Gregory Stempfle	81,849	1.96%	−0.02%
Constitution	Robert Gale	48,816	1.17%	+0.05%
Total votes		4,184,026	100.0%	N/A
Democratic gain from Republican				
