= Eric Smith (Michigan politician) =

American lawyer

Macomb County Prosecutor
- In office January 1, 2005 – March 30, 2020
- Preceded by: Carl J. Marlinga
- Succeeded by: Jean Smart

Personal details
- Education: Central Michigan University; Detroit College of Law
- Profession: Attorney (disbarred)

Eric Smith is a former Macomb County Prosecutor and convicted criminal. He resigned on March 30, 2020, after criminal charges were filed against him.

Smith had also gained national notoriety in 2007 due to the Tara Grant murder case, which Smith personally prosecuted.

== Personal life and education ==
Smith earned a bachelor's degree from Central Michigan University and a J.D. from Detroit College of Law. He also attended Chippewa Valley High School.

== Career ==
Smith started his career with the prosecutor's office in 1993. He would eventually serve as senior trial attorney, chief of the sex crimes unit, and chief assistant prosecutor.

Smith filed to run for the Democratic nomination for Prosecutor in 2004. Incumbent Prosecutor Carl J. Marlinga announced he would not seek re-election following his indictment in April 2004 by a federal grand jury on allegations that he had helped a convicted rapist receive a new trial in exchange for campaign contributions to Marlinga's failed congressional run in 2002. Smith emerged victorious from a six-person primary field, taking approximately 29 percent of the vote. Smith defeated Republican nominee David Viviano in the general election, taking 53 percent of the vote. Smith would win re-election in 2008, 2012, and 2016, beating Republican Michael Wrathell in each election.

Smith gained national notoriety in 2007 due to the Tara Grant murder case, which Smith personally prosecuted. Grant was strangled to death and eventually dismembered by her husband, Stephen Grant, in the couple's Washington Township home on February 9, 2007. Stephen Grant was convicted of second degree murder in December 2007 and was sentenced to 50–80 years in prison. Smith was fined $750 by Michigan's Attorney Grievance Commission in September 2012 for calling Stephen Grant a "sociopath" after his February 2007 arrest. The commission said Smith's comments lacked "courtesy and respect." Smith did not contest the fine.

In October 2010, Smith left an angry and profanity-laced voicemail to Republican James Perna, who was running against Smith's brother Bob for a seat on the Macomb County Commission. Perna initially filed a complaint with the Michigan State Police over the incident. Perna eventually dropped the complaint after Smith personally apologized and the matter was settled privately.

== State and Federal Corruption Investigations ==
=== Allegations and Investigation ===
In August 2018, Macomb County Treasurer Lawrence Rocca informed the Macomb County Board of Commissioners of potential misspending of approximately $1.8 million in funds from four accounts controlled by Smith's office that were mostly generated via civil forfeiture through drunken driving convictions. The accounts were created after Smith took office in 2005 and were never audited because they were not part of the formal county budget. In February 2019, the Board of Commissioners approved hiring a forensic accounting firm, UHY Advisors, to conduct a formal audit of the funds. Rocca was concerned that Smith had not saved any receipts to match up with his spending, while Smith accused Rocca, a Republican, of using the issue for political purposes. The board fired UHY Advisors one day after hiring them after learning that one of the firm's partners had served as the treasurer for the campaign committee for Democratic Macomb County Executive Mark Hackel. Hackel, who spent 10 years as Macomb County Sheriff, claimed the dismissal was orchestrated by Smith's brother Bob, who was chairman of the Board of Commissioners.

On February 25, 2019, Hackel announced he was seeking a criminal investigation into Smith's activities from the office of Michigan Attorney General Dana Nessel and was requesting the Michigan Department of Treasury to conduct a forensic audit. Smith said Hackel was only making the recommendation to divert attention from his relationship with UHY Advisors and called for investigations into expenditures and funds controlled by Hackel and Rocca. On April 1, 2019, Nessel's office and the Michigan State Police confirmed they had opened a criminal investigation upon Hackel's request.

The State Police executed a search warrant at Smith's office on April 17, 2019, and his Macomb Township home on May 14, 2019. The Detroit News also reported that the FBI was conducting a criminal investigation of Smith.

=== Indictment, Arrest and Resignation ===
==== Charges ====
On March 24, 2020, Smith was formally charged by the Michigan Attorney General's office with 10 felonies; five counts of embezzlement by a public official and one count each of conducting a criminal enterprise, official misconduct in office, tampering with evidence in a civil proceeding, accessory after the fact to embezzlement by a public official and conspiracy to commit forgery. The penalties for convictions range from four to twenty years in prison. Smith turned himself in to the Michigan State Police and was formally arraigned via video conferencing on March 27, 2020, and released on $100,000 personal bond. Also charged with Smith were former Macomb County Treasurer and state representative Derek Miller, who was an assistant prosecutor and served as Chief of Operations, second-in-command under Smith; Benjamin Liston, a retired assistant prosecutor who served as Smith's Chief of Operations before Miller; and William Weber, owner of a security company. In September 2020, Liston agreed to plead guilty to three misdemeanor counts of willful neglect by a public official and testify against Smith, Miller and Weber, in exchange for the attorney general's office dropping four felony charges against him. Prosecutors agreed to a sentence of 60-days in the Macomb County Jail and Liston agreed to surrender his law license and pay approximately $16,000 in restitution.

==== Resignation as prosecutor ====
Following the charges being announced, Smith once again said the investigation was political payback, this time saying it was because he did not initially support Nessel in her 2018 election for Attorney General. Despite professing his innocence, Smith resigned from office on March 30, 2020. It was later revealed that Smith's resignation was a condition of ongoing plea negotiations between Smith and federal prosecutors. A probable cause hearing and separate preliminary examination scheduled for October 2020 were postponed to January 2021 because the courtroom at the 41-B District Court in Clinton Township had not yet been approved to host such hearings because of the COVID-19 pandemic. The probable cause conference was delayed until March 26 and the preliminary examination was delayed until April 21–23.

In September 2020, Smith was charged obstruction of justice in the United States District Court for the Eastern District of Michigan by U.S. Attorney Matthew J. Schneider. Smith was accused of taking $75,000 from his campaign account to use for personal expenses, then encouraging potential witnesses to lie on his behalf. Smith agreed to plead guilty to the federal charges, with federal prosecutors recommending Smith serve between 15 and 21 months in prison. Smith was formally arraigned before U.S. District Court Magistrate Anthony Patti on September 18, 2020, and released on personal recognizance bail and ordered not to leave the state without the court's permission. Smith was to formally plead guilty on October 28, 2020, but the hearing was delayed because Smith and his family were exposed to someone that had tested positive for coronavirus and the Smith family had gone into quarantine. The plea hearing was again rescheduled in November 2020 when Smith revealed he had tested positive for COVID-19 and had been recently hospitalized for treatment for the virus. The hearing was again postponed by U.S. District Judge Linda Parker to January 27, 2021, with Parker saying that Smith's continued recovery from COVID-19 "...preclude him from meaningful participation in his pending plea hearing."

==== Guilty plea ====
Smith formally pleaded guilty in federal court on January 27, 2021, saying "...I fully accept responsibility for my actions, I acted alone. I acted for my own benefit. I deeply regret my actions and the shame I brought to my wife, my children, the office I spent almost 30 years working for and the people of Macomb County. And I accept the punishment and the plea that's here before you today." Smith's sentencing was scheduled for April 27, 2021, and his plea agreement with the federal government recommended a sentence of between 15 and 21 month in prison and for Smith to agree to a civil forfeiture of approximately $70,000.

==== Sentencing and disbarment ====
On February 16, 2022, Smith was sentenced to 21 months in federal prison. He was also disbarred effective June 15, 2022.

==== Prison ====
On January 31, 2023, the Federal Bureau of Prisons released Smith from prison. At the time of his release, he had served seven months of his 21-month sentence. Smith was transferred to community confinement, which officials said may consist of home confinement or a halfway house.

==== State trial ====
Smith is facing a May 15 trial on state charges which allege misuse of drug and forfeiture funds in his former office.

== Electoral history ==
2004 Macomb County Prosecutor Democratic Primary
Party	Candidate	Votes	%
Democratic	Eric Smith	13,548	29.3
Democratic	Nick Ciaramitaro	12,571	27.2
Democratic	Tom Rombach	7,818	16.9
Democratic	Sebastian Lucido	7,133	15.4
Democratic	William Thomas Marrocco	4,317	9.3
Democratic	Roy Transit	907	2.0
Majority		977	2.1
Turnout		46,204	

Macomb County Prosecutor election, 2004
Party	Candidate	Votes	%	±%
Democratic	Eric Smith	201,923	53.4	−12.0
Republican	David Viviano	176,441	46.6	+12.0
Majority		25,482	6.8	−24.0
Turnout		378,364		+16.5
Democratic hold				

Macomb County Prosecutor election, 2008
Party	Candidate	Votes	%	±%
Democratic	Eric Smith (incumbent)	268,332	69.5	+16.1
Republican	Michael Wrathell	117,630	30.5	−16.1
Majority		150,702	39.0	+32.2
Turnout		385,962		+2.0
Democratic hold				

Macomb County Prosecutor election, 2012
Party	Candidate	Votes	%	±%
Democratic	Eric Smith (incumbent)	245,384	65.6	−3.9
Republican	Michael Wrathell	128,515	34.4	+3.9
Majority		116,869	31.2	−7.8
Turnout		373,899		−3.1
Democratic hold				

Macomb County Prosecutor election, 2016
Party	Candidate	Votes	%	±%
Democratic	Eric Smith (incumbent)	241,162	61.6	−4.0
Republican	Michael Wrathell	150,492	38.4	+4.0
Majority		90,670	23.2	−8.0
Turnout		391,654		+4.7
Democratic hold				
