= Kristina Karamo =

American political activist

Chair of the Michigan Republican Party
- In office February 18, 2023 – January 6, 2024
- Preceded by: Ronald Weiser
- Succeeded by: Malinda Pego (acting)

Personal details
- Born: 1985 or 1986 (age 40–41)
- Party: Republican
- Spouse: Adom Karamo (div. 2014)
- Education: Macomb County Community College; Oakland University (BA); Talbot School of Theology (MA)

Kristina Karamo (born 1985 or 1986) is an American politician and former poll watcher who served as the chairperson of the Michigan Republican Party from 2023 to 2024. Karamo was the Republican Party's nominee in the 2022 Michigan Secretary of State election, losing to incumbent Democrat Jocelyn Benson in a landslide. She is commonly seen as being far-right.

Karamo is a staunch proponent of many debunked conspiracy theories, including the false claim that Donald Trump won Michigan (and the national presidential election) in 2020.

== Education and teaching career ==
Karamo received an associate's degree from Macomb County Community College. She graduated from Oakland University with a bachelor's in communications and media studies. She graduated from Talbot School of Theology with a master’s degree in Christian Apologetics.

As of 2017, she has served as an instructor of Career and Professional Development at Wayne County Community College.

== Political activities ==
Karamo was a member of the MIGOP State Committee. She ran for the 10th district of the Oakland County Board of Commissioners in 2018, which covers the city of Pontiac, but lost in the Republican primary.

=== 2020 presidential election ===
Karamo was a poll watcher in the 2020 presidential election. After Donald Trump lost the election to Joe Biden, she began repeating Trump's false claims that there had been massive voter fraud. She alleged illegal votes were included in the count. She stated in an affidavit that she had "personally witnessed" irregularities in vote counting during her time as a poll watcher. After the January 6th United States Capitol attack, she called it a false-flag operation, saying that "this is completely Antifa posing as Trump supporters...anybody can buy a MAGA hat and put on a t-shirt and buy a Trump flag”.

=== 2022 Michigan Secretary of State candidacy ===
Karamo was the party's nominee in the 2022 Michigan Secretary of State election. She framed her platform as based on family values and religion, including a religious objection to abortion.

Two weeks before election day, she filed a lawsuit in which she alleged ballot "mules" had cast illegal ballots and that there were concerns with voting machines, attempting to throw out absentee ballots from Detroit.

Karamo lost to incumbent Democrat Jocelyn Benson by 14 percentage points, the largest margin of defeat for any statewide Republican candidate that year, but she refused to concede the election. Hers was also the worst performance for a Republican Secretary of State nominee since 1990.

=== Michigan Republican Party Chair ===
In 2023 Karamo was elected to lead the Michigan Republican Party. Karamo was the first Black woman to chair the state party.

In March 2023, Karamo faced widespread criticism and condemnation for defending a social media post by the Michigan Republican Party which compared recent gun control bills passed by the legislature to the Holocaust. Karamo defended the comparison and refused to apologize or take down the post. In a contentious press conference, Karamo argued that people get “way too offended” and said it should not be controversial to "point to history". Several prominent Michigan GOP officeholders and officials, the Republican Jewish Coalition, and numerous others have condemned the comparison and Karamo’s defense of the post. On January 6, 2024, the party voted to oust her as chairperson of the Michigan Republican Party after criticism for the lack of fundraising and other financial problems. Karamo has refused to recognize her ouster, claiming the meeting where she was voted out was "illegal". The Republican National Committee contradicted Karamo's claims and stated their initial review of the removal indicated that she was "properly removed". Karamo was officially replaced on February 14, 2024 by Pete Hoekstra. Kent County judge Joseph Rossi ruled on February 27 that her removal was "valid."

=== 2024 leadership schism ===
On January 6, 2024, a group of Michigan Republican Party state committee members voted 40–5 to remove Karamo, using proxies set by District Chairs without the knowledge of the proxied members to attain quorum. The group of state committee members acknowledged Malinda Pego, who served as co-chair under Karamo, as Acting Chairwoman of the Michigan Republican Party until a vote for an official replacement is held. Meanwhile, Kristina Karamo repeatedly stated that she didn't recognize the vote and was therefore still chairwoman, as she claimed that the meeting was set up against the bylaws of the Michigan GOP. Malinda Pego's faction responded with a 31-paged document arguing how the meeting to oust Karamo followed the state party's bylaws, therefore making the results legitimate and legal.

On January 13, 2024, another group of Michigan Republican Party state committee members voted to reinstate Kristina Karamo as chair, as well as the removal of several nonsupporting party officials—including Malinda Pego—from the state party, despite Karamo previously claiming that Pego had resigned. That same day, 9 of 13 Michigan GOP Congressional district chairs, as well as 3 of 6 Michigan GOP vice chairs, released a statement acknowledging the ousting of Kristina Karamo the week prior.

According to Malinda Pego, a state committee meeting to vote for a new chair was held on January 20, 2024. Pete Hoekstra was elected as chairman during the vote. However, Karamo has insisted that she is still the legitimate chairperson. The Karamo faction of the party controlled the state party's finances and infrastructure including the official MIGOP web site. The Hoekstra faction of the MIGOP set up its own infrastructure and official website.

The RNC determined that Karamo was properly removed as MIGOP chair, but hadn't decided at that time if Hoekstra was the new chair. Both Hoekstra and Karamo were invited to the Republican Party winter meeting in Las Vegas on January 30 but neither were credentialed as party chair. The two rivals received guest credentials but were not given voting rights. Former president Donald Trump sided with Hoekstra. The RNC on February 14 recognized Hoekstra as the MIGOP chair. The officially recognized Michigan Republican Party leadership uses a new website, as the prior website was under Karamo's control. Circuit Court Judge Joseph Rossi ruled that Karamo was properly removed as MIGOP chair. Karamo has filed an appeal to the Michigan Court of Appeals.

The divisions persisted at the state party's political convention held August 24, 2024 in Flint to choose nominees for the state supreme court, university presidents and the state board of education. Karamo was ejected from the convention.

== Personal life ==
Karamo is a resident of Oak Park and is a divorced mother of two children. She was married to Adom Karamo; the marriage ended in 2014 with a divorce. In an October 2021 court record first published by Jezebel, her ex-husband Adom Karamo claimed that she had threatened to kill herself and their daughters in a car crash. Karamo denied these allegations, saying they were an attempt by her ex-husband to "exploit the fact that [she is] a public figure, using it as leverage to change the custody agreement he became dissatisfied with".

Karamo believes that demonic possession is real and may be transferred through sexual relations. She has also said that abortion is child sacrifice and a Satanic practice, that pop stars such as Beyonce, Jay-Z, Cardi B, Ariana Grande, and Billie Eilish are tools of Satan recruiting their followers into paganism, and that yoga is a ritual to summon demons. Karamo is also a fan of Korean dramas, yet criticized one plot line centered on communicating with deceased ancestors, saying, "Satan, again, he's so crafty... It is so important to know that you're not communicating with no ancestors. Sweetheart, you're communicating with demons."

== Electoral history ==
2018 Oakland County 10th Commission District Republican primary election
Party	Candidate	Votes	%
Republican	David B. Foster	473	60.18%
Republican	Kristina Karamo	307	39.06%
Write-in		6	0.76%
Total votes		786	100%

2022 Michigan Secretary of State election
Party	Candidate	Votes	%	±%
Democratic	Jocelyn Benson (incumbent)	2,467,859	55.86%	+2.96%
Republican	Kristina Karamo	1,852,510	41.93%	−2.05%
Libertarian	Gregory Scott Stempfle	52,982	1.20%	−0.76%
Constitution	Christine Schwartz	27,937	0.63%	−0.54%
Green	Larry James Hutchinson Jr.	16,615	0.38%	N/A
Total votes		4,417,903	100.00%	

Party political offices
Preceded by Mary Treder Lang	Republican nominee for Secretary of State of Michigan; 2022	Succeeded by Anthony Forlini
Preceded by Ronald Weiser	Chair of the Michigan Republican Party; 2023–2024	Succeeded by Malinda Pego; Acting
