= 2014 Michigan Secretary of State election =

- November 4, 2014
- Turnout: 3,080,795
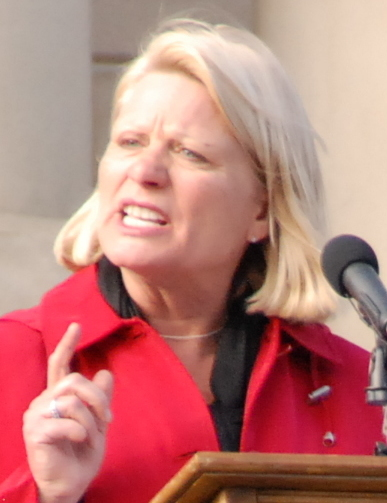

Nominee	Ruth Johnson	Godfrey Dillard
Party	Republican	Democratic
Popular vote	1,649,047	1,323,004
Percentage	53.53%	42.94%
- Johnson: 40–50% 50–60% 60–70% 70–80% Dillard: 40–50% 50–60% 60–70% 70–80%
Secretary of State before election
Ruth Johnson
Republican
Elected Secretary of State
Ruth Johnson
Republican

The Michigan Secretary of State election of 2014 took place on November 4, 2014, to elect the Secretary of State of Michigan. Incumbent Republican Secretary of State Ruth Johnson was re-elected to a second term in office with 53.53% of the vote.

== Republican convention ==
=== Candidates ===
==== Declared ====
- Ruth Johnson, incumbent Secretary of State

== Democratic convention ==
=== Candidates ===
==== Declared ====
- Godfrey Dillard, attorney and candidate for Michigan's 15th congressional district in 1996

== Minor parties ==
=== Taxpayers Party ===
- Robert Gale, perennial candidate

=== Natural Law Party ===
- Jason Gatties, nominee for Michigan's 6th congressional district in 2012

=== Libertarian Party ===
- Jamie Lewis, nominee for the State Senate in 2006 and 2010

== General election ==
=== Polling ===
Poll source	Date(s) administered	Sample size	Margin of error	Ruth Johnson (R)	Godfrey Dillard (D)	Other	Undecided
Mitchell Research	November 2, 2014	1,224	± 2.8%	47%	40%	5%	8%
Public Policy Polling	November 1–2, 2014	914	± 3.2%	46%	38%	6%	9%
EPIC-MRA	October 26–28, 2014	600	± 4%	41%	37%	3%	19%
Glengariff Group	October 22–24, 2014	600	± 4%	41%	32.5%	4.3%	22.1%
EPIC-MRA	October 17–19, 2014	600	± 4%	42%	33%	3%	21%
Glengariff Group	October 2–4, 2014	600	± 4%	38.7%	31.8%	5.2%	24.3%
Mitchell Research	September 29, 2014	1,178	± 2.86%	41%	37%	22%	
EPIC-MRA	September 25–29, 2014	600	± 4%	40%	30%	10%	20%
Target-Insyght	September 22–24, 2014	616	± 4%	39%	38%	5%	18%
Denno Research	September 11–13, 2014	600	± 4%	36.3%	32.7%	—	31%
Suffolk	September 6–10, 2014	500	± 4.4%	36.2%	39.8%	3.6%	20.6%
Public Policy Polling	September 4–7, 2014	687	± 3.7%	39%	36%	7%	18%
Glengariff Group	September 3–5, 2014	600	± 4%	39.9%	33.5%	0.8%	25.8%

=== Results ===
Michigan secretary of state election, 2014
Party	Candidate	Votes	%	±%
Republican	Ruth Johnson (incumbent)	1,649,047	53.53%	+2.85%
Democratic	Godfrey Dillard	1,323,004	42.94%	−2.28%
Libertarian	Jamie Lewis	61,112	1.98%	+0.15%
U.S. Taxpayers'	Robert Gale	34,447	1.12%	−0.19%
Natural Law	Jason Gatties	13,185	0.43%	N/A
Majority		326,043	10.59%	+5.13%
Turnout		3,080,795		−2.91%
Republican hold		Swing		

=== By congressional district ===
Johnson won ten of 14 congressional districts, including one that elected a Democrat.

District	Johnson	Dillard	Representative
1st	58%	38%	Dan Benishek
2nd	64%	32%	
2nd	64%	32%	Bill Huizenga
3rd	62%	34%	Justin Amash
4th	59%	36%	Dave Camp (113th Congress)
4th	59%	36%	John Moolenaar (114th Congress)
5th	43%	53%	Dan Kildee
6th	58%	37%	Fred Upton
7th	59%	37%	Tim Walberg
8th	62%	35%	Mike Rogers (113th Congress)
8th	62%	35%	Mike Bishop (114th Congress)
9th	53%	44%	Sander Levin
10th	64%	32%	Candice Miller
11th	65%	32%	Kerry Bentivolio (113th Congress)
11th	65%	32%	Dave Trott (114th Congress)
12th	43%	54%	John Dingell (113th Congress)
12th	43%	54%	Debbie Dingell (114th Congress)
13th	21%	77%	John Conyers
14th	27%	71%	Gary Peters (113th Congress)
14th	27%	71%	Brenda Lawrence (114th Congress)
