= 2010 Michigan Secretary of State election =

- November 2, 2010
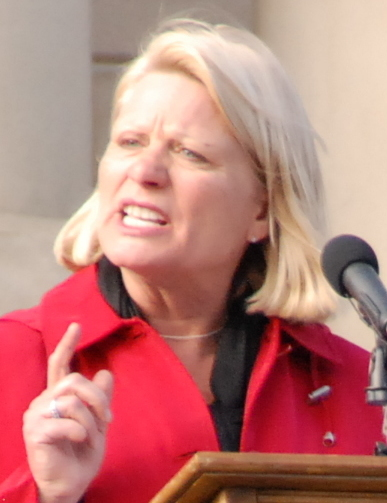

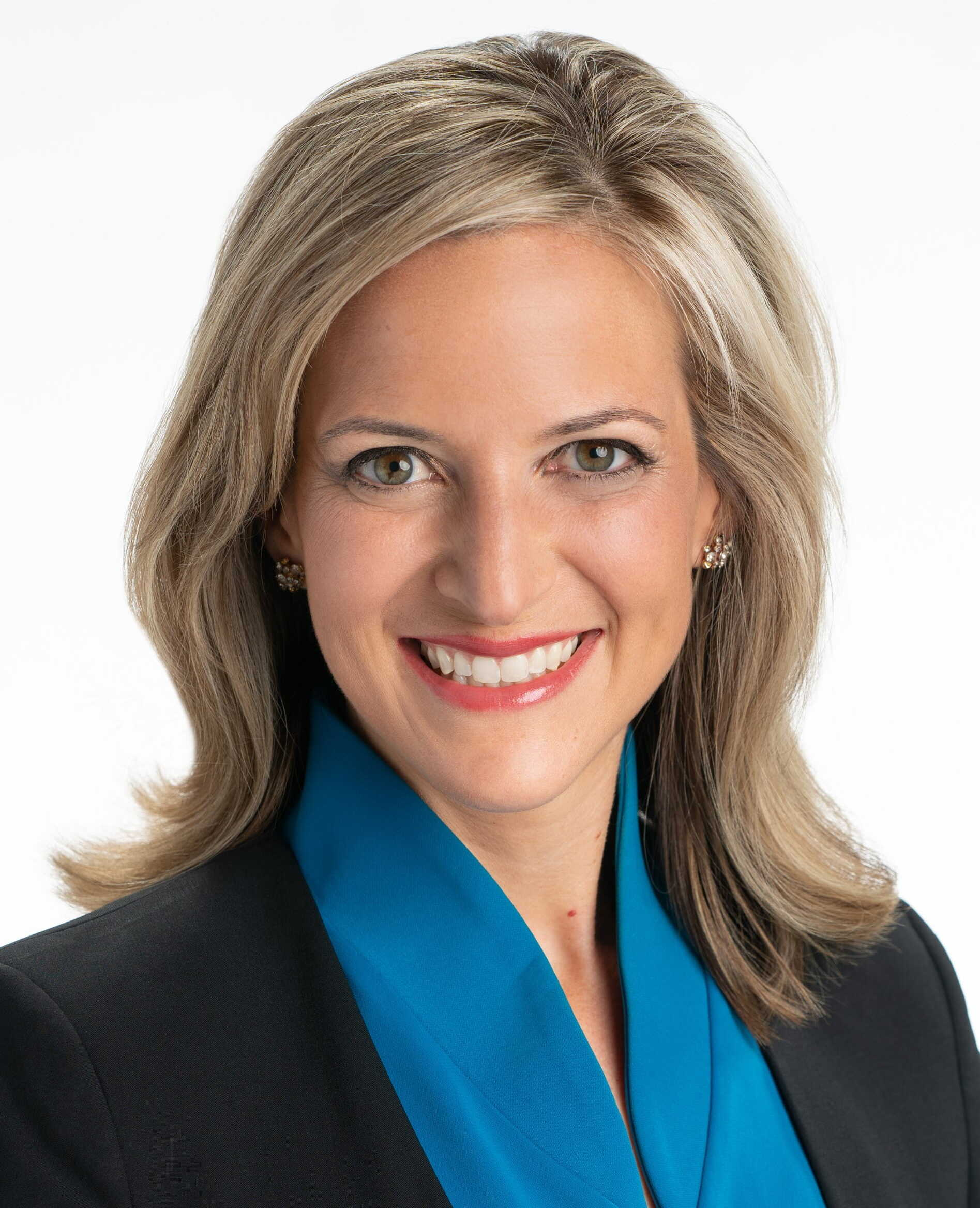
Nominee	Ruth Johnson	Jocelyn Benson
Party	Republican	Democratic
Popular vote	1,608,270	1,434,796
Percentage	50.68%	45.22%
- County results Johnson: 40-50% 50-60% 60-70% 70-80% Benson: 40–50% 50–60% 60–70%
Secretary of State before election
Terri Lynn Land
Republican
Elected Secretary of State
Ruth Johnson
Republican

The 2010 Michigan Secretary of State election was held on Tuesday, November 2, 2010 to elect the Michigan Secretary of State for a four-year term. Incumbent Republican Terri Lynn Land was term-limited and unable to run for re-election.

== Candidates ==
=== Republican Party ===
Former state representative Ruth Johnson won the party's nomination during the state convention.

=== Democratic Party ===
Law professor Jocelyn Benson won the party's nomination during the state convention.

== Results ==
Michigan Secretary of State election, 2010
Party	Candidate	Votes	%
Republican	Ruth Johnson	1,608,270	50.68
Democratic	Jocelyn Benson	1,434,796	45.22
Libertarian	Scotty Boman	58,044	1.83
U.S. Taxpayers	Robert Gale	41,727	1.31
Green	John A. La Pietra	30,411	0.96
Total votes		3,173,248	100
Republican hold			
