= Gideon O. Whittemore =

American lawyer and politician

5th Secretary of State of Michigan
- In office 1846–1848
- Governor: Alpheus Felch; William L. Greenly
- Preceded by: Robert P. Eldredge
- Succeeded by: George Washington Peck

Personal details
- Born: Gideon Olin Whittemore; August 12, 1800; St. Albans, Vermont, U.S.
- Died: June 30, 1863 (aged 62); Tawas City, Michigan, U.S.
- Profession: Politician, lawyer, judge

Gideon Olin Whittemore (August 12, 1800 – June 30, 1863) was an American lawyer and politician.

Whittemore was born in St. Albans, Vermont on August 12, 1800, studied law, and was admitted to the bar. He began practicing law in Pontiac, Michigan, and was a judge in Oakland County. He was appointed to the Board of Regents of the University of Michigan from 1837 to 1840, served as Michigan Secretary of State from 1846 to 1848, and later entered the lumber business.

He died on June 30, 1863, in Tawas City, Michigan.

Political offices
| Preceded by Robert P. Eldredge | Secretary of State of Michigan; 1846–1848 | Succeeded by George Washington Peck |
