= Jocelyn Benson =

Governor-elect of Michigan (born 1977)

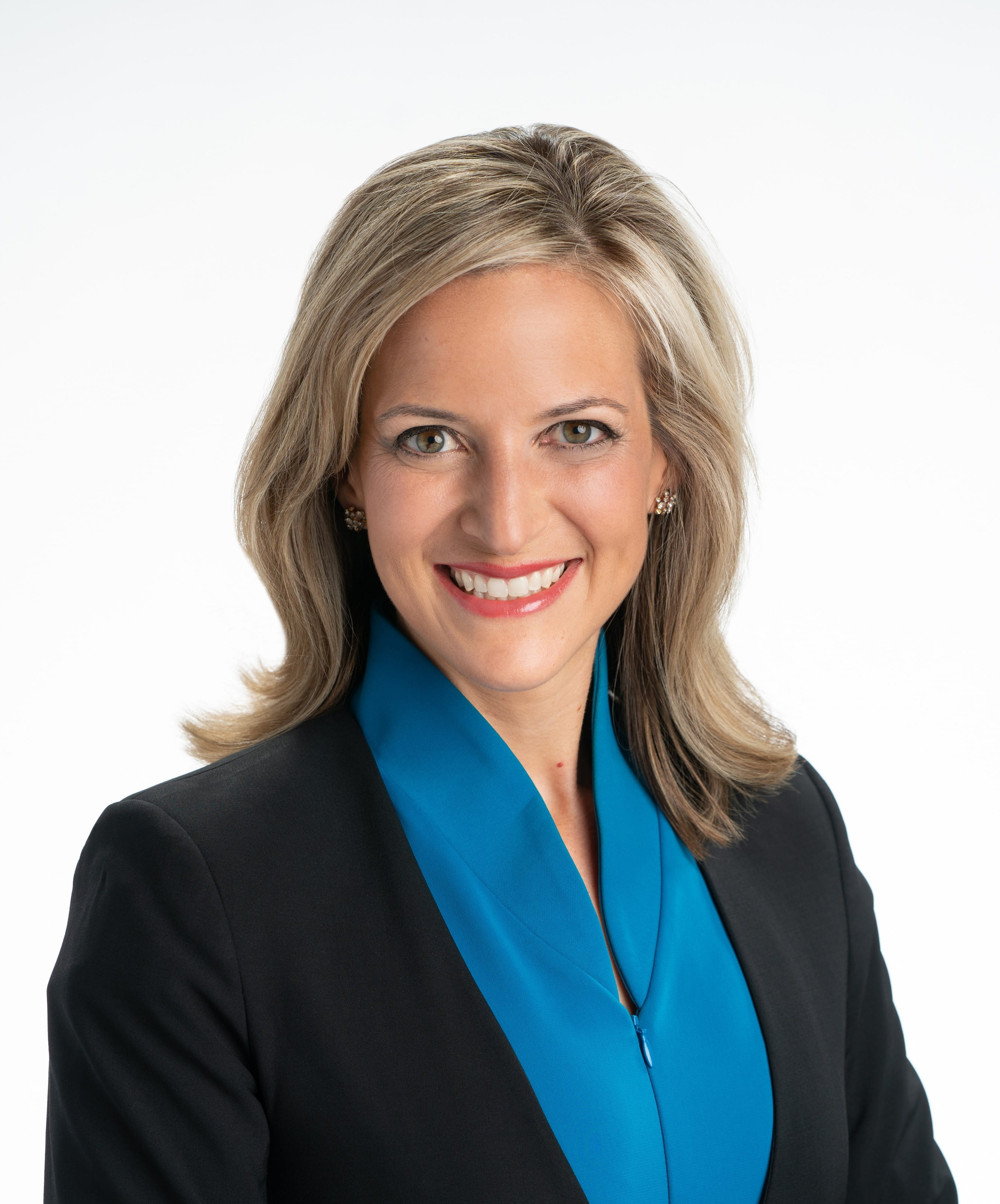
- Benson in 2019

Governor-elect of Michigan
- Assuming office January 1, 2027
- Lieutenant: Winnie Brinks (elect)
- Succeeding: Gretchen Whitmer

43rd Secretary of State of Michigan
- Incumbent
- Assumed office January 1, 2019
- Governor: Gretchen Whitmer
- Deputy: Aghogho Edevbie
- Preceded by: Ruth Johnson

Dean of the Wayne State University Law School
- In office December 2012 – September 2016
- Preceded by: Robert Ackerman
- Succeeded by: Richard Bierschbach

Personal details
- Born: Jocelyn Michelle Benson; October 22, 1977 (age 49) Pittsburgh, Pennsylvania, U.S.
- Party: Democratic
- Spouse: Ryan Friedrichs
- Children: 1
- Education: Wellesley College (BA); Magdalen College, Oxford (MPhil); Harvard University (JD)
- Awards: Profile in Courage Award (2022); Presidential Citizens Medal (2023)
- Website: Office website Campaign website

Jocelyn Michelle Benson (born October 22, 1977) is an American politician and attorney who is the governor-elect of Michigan. Since 2019, she has served as the 43rd secretary of state of Michigan. A member of the Democratic Party, Benson served as dean of Wayne State University Law School from 2012 to 2016.

In 2018, Benson was elected Michigan's secretary of state by 8.9 percentage points over Republican nominee Mary Treder Lang. This victory made her the first Democrat to hold the office since 1995. She was reelected in 2022, defeating Republican Kristina Karamo by 14 percentage points, setting a record for the largest margin and vote share among statewide candidates that year.

Benson won the 2026 Michigan gubernatorial election, defeating Republican nominee John James.

== Education and early career ==
Benson was raised in Pittsburgh, Pennsylvania. She graduated from Wellesley College with a bachelor's degree in 1999. She received a master's in sociology as a Marshall Scholar at Magdalen College, Oxford. After college, Benson moved from Massachusetts to Montgomery, Alabama, to work for the Southern Poverty Law Center, where she investigated hate groups and hate crimes. Benson also worked as a legal assistant to Nina Totenberg at National Public Radio (NPR).

Benson received a Juris Doctor degree from Harvard Law School, where she was a general editor of the Harvard Civil Rights-Civil Liberties Law Review. From 2002 to 2004, she was the voting rights policy coordinator of the Civil Rights Project. Upon graduation from law school, Benson moved to Detroit, Michigan, to serve as a law clerk to Judge Damon Keith of the United States Court of Appeals for the Sixth Circuit.

Benson became a faculty member of the Wayne State University Law School in Detroit in 2005. In 2010, Benson published a book, State Secretaries of State: Guardians of the Democratic Process. In 2012, at the age of 36, Benson was appointed dean of the Wayne State University Law School, becoming the youngest woman ever to lead an accredited law school.

In 2016, Benson stepped down as dean of the Wayne State University Law School to serve as CEO of the Ross Initiative in Sports for Equality, a New York-based group funded by Stephen M. Ross. She served in this position until 2018.

== Secretary of State ==
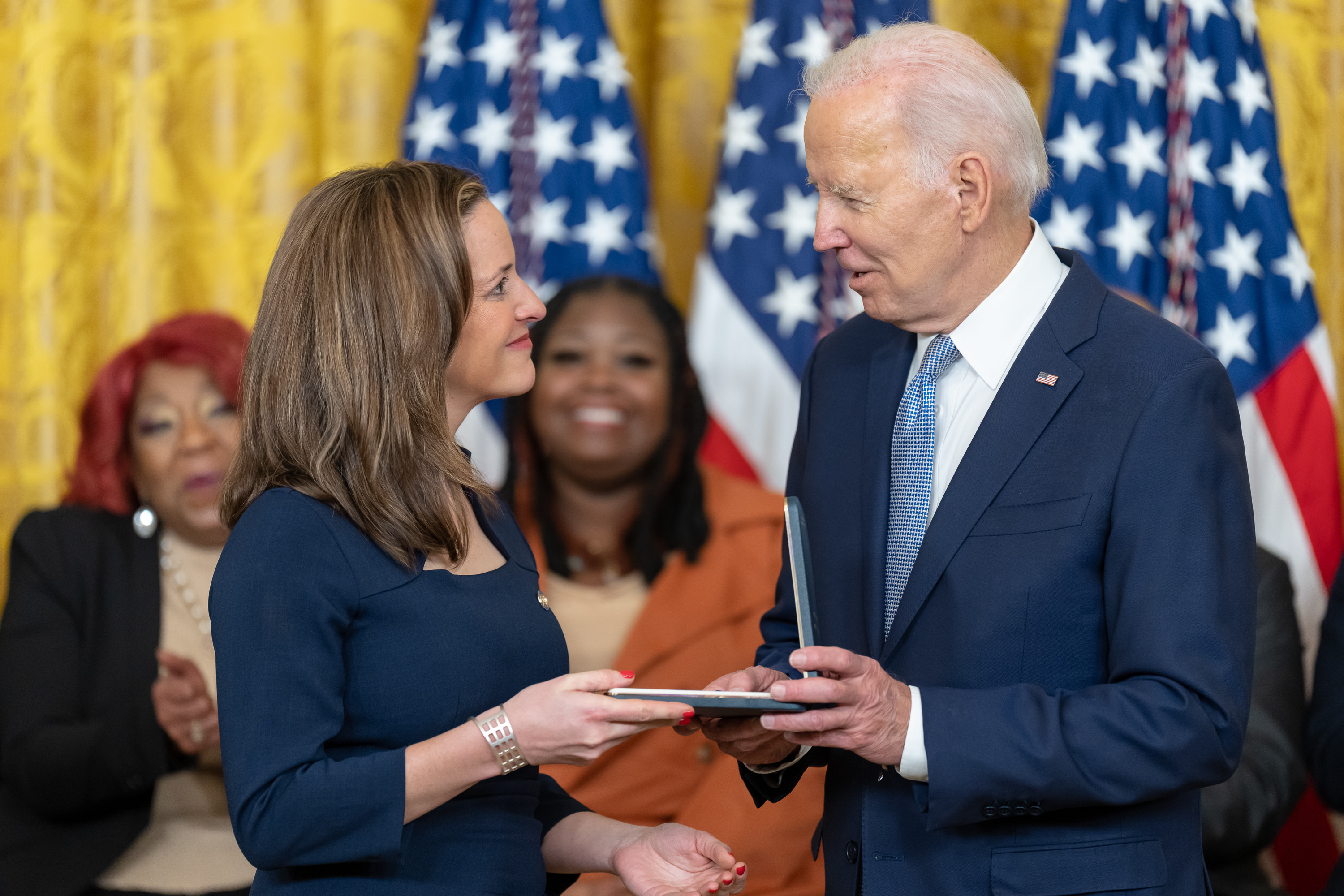
Benson receives the Presidential Citizens Medal from President Joe Biden in January 2023.

=== Elections ===
In 2010, while a faculty member at Wayne Law, Benson mounted her first campaign for Michigan Secretary of State. She lost to Republican candidate Ruth Johnson by a margin of 51 percent to 45 percent.

On October 27, 2017, Benson announced her second candidacy for Michigan Secretary of State. She was elected on November 6, 2018, defeating Republican Mary Treder Lang, becoming the first Democrat to serve since Richard Austin left office in 1995. In 2022, Benson secured her party's nomination uncontested and went on to win the general election with 56% of the vote, defeating Republican candidate Kristina Karamo.

=== Tenure ===
In 2018, Michigan voters approved a constitutional amendment allowing Election Day voter registration and unrestricted absentee ballots. Benson's office oversaw the implementation of these changes. In 2019, the Election Modernization Advisory Committee was established. The same year, Benson established an Election Security Commission and a Collegiate Student Advisory Task Force.

In October 2019, Benson was named in a lawsuit filed by Priorities USA Action, a Democratic group, over the elimination of absentee votes due to disparities between a voter's signature and other filed documents with election officials. In November, the group targeted her in a lawsuit challenging the state's automatic registration law and alleging undue burdens on young voters' constitutional rights. In March 2021, Michigan's Court of Claims ruled against Benson, saying that although the instructions' content did not breach election law, she had not followed the appropriate procedural measures while providing guidance to clerks on verifying signatures on absentee ballots.

In 2020, Benson's office mailed absentee voter applications to all 7.7 million Michigan registered voters for the August primary and November general election. Benson's effort was funded by $4.5 million in federal coronavirus relief funding from the CARES Act. Some Republican lawmakers criticized the move, saying it could endanger election security by leaving more room for voter fraud. Benson's predecessor, Ruth Johnson, criticized her for using COVID-19 relief funds to mail absentee ballot applications to all registered voters.

As President Trump voiced concerns about potential election fraud associated with absentee voting, his criticism particularly targeted Benson's mailing effort. He called Benson a "rogue Secretary of State" and initially threatened to withhold federal funds for coronavirus relief, but later retracted his threat. Court rulings affirmed Benson's legal authority to mail absentee ballot applications to all registered voters in Michigan in 2020, while the state auditor discredited Republican claims of fraudulent ballots from deceased voters. On December 7, 2020, reportedly armed pro-Trump demonstrators gathered outside Benson's home, echoing Trump's election fraud claims. The demonstrators chanted and made threatening demands to overturn Michigan's election results, linking the incident to broader efforts by Trump and his legal team to challenge the election outcome. No arrests were made and police confirmed that there were no breaches of criminal law throughout the demonstration.

In January 2020, a 72-year-old man was arrested after evidence was found in his home related to violent threats he directed at Benson. In December 2022, Benson said that threats from election deniers that started in 2020 had not ceased. In May 2023, she claimed in an interview that after the election, Trump suggested she be tried for treason and possibly executed, an accusation he denied.

In June 2020, Benson initiated a platform enabling registered voters to apply for an absentee ballot online, using their state ID and last four digits of their Social Security numbers. Voters were also allowed to submit a scanned, signed copy of their absentee ballot application via email. Benson also played a role in developing an online ballot-tracking tool for absentee ballots. Benson said that the attempts to delegitimize the 2020 election ultimately resulted in the January 6 United States Capitol attack. In March 2021, State Court of Claims Judge Christopher M. Murray ruled that Benson's guidance issued to Michigan clerks prior to the 2020 election, instructing them to presume the accuracy of absentee ballot signatures, was invalid because it had not gone through the proper rule-making process.

Referencing Michigan's 2015 ranking as the lowest in the U.S. for ethics and transparency, Benson has advocated for ethics reforms and called for increased transparency in the state's government in the wake of various scandals. In March 2021, Benson introduced a legislative agenda called "From Worst to First" which included proposed measures such as expanding the Freedom of Information Act to cover the governor and legislature, requiring personal financial disclosures from elected officials, demanding more frequent campaign disclosures, and tightening campaign finance regulations. In 2023, she criticized inaction from legislators, describing the state's lobbying and campaign finance laws as "far, far behind" other states.

In April 2021, Benson announced that Michigan residents who visit secretary of state offices would always need an appointment. That same year, she said 60% of transactions were being done virtually. Despite criticisms calling for the reintroduction of walk-in services, Benson defended retaining the system even after the COVID-19 pandemic, saying the appointment only system is "not perfect" but is better than residents having to potentially wait hours in line. In 2022, Benson was named as one of five recipients of the John F. Kennedy Profile in Courage Award. In September 2022, the Election Integrity Force and others sued Benson and Michigan's governor, Gretchen Whitmer, in a bid to decertify the 2020 election. On January 6, 2023, Benson was awarded the Presidential Citizens Medal by President Joe Biden.

In July 2023, she confirmed that federal prosecutors interviewed her for "several hours" in March as part of the ongoing criminal probe into efforts to overturn the 2020 election. While not divulging specific details, Benson highlighted the investigators' focus on the impact on election workers' lives of misinformation about their work and threats of violence against them. In October 2023, a 60-year-old man from Detroit was sentenced to 15 months of probation after threatening to kill Benson and Michigan Governor Gretchen Whitmer.

In a 2023 opinion piece for The Washington Post, Benson argued that secretaries of state, including herself, shouldn't unilaterally decide Trump's eligibility to serve as President under the 14th Amendment of the U.S. Constitution, and emphasized that the courts, particularly the Supreme Court, are the appropriate forums for such determinations. In November 2023, Trump's legal team sued to prevent Benson from excluding him in Michigan's 2024 elections. The lawsuit sought an injunction against barring him from the ballot. The dispute traces back to a Free Speech for People lawsuit, asserting that Trump's Capitol riot involvement violates Section 3 of the 14th Amendment.

In advance of the 2024 presidential election, Benson, along with other Democrats, participated in the Democracy Playbook, a set of recommendations by the NewDEAL Forum to improve the election system. Benson supports stricter penalties against those who harass election workers and increased funding for election administration. Benson was viewed as a potential contender for the 2024 U.S. Senate race in Michigan to succeed retiring Senator Debbie Stabenow. In March 2023, Benson announced that she would not enter the race.

== 2026 gubernatorial campaign ==
In January 2025, on the anniversary of the U.S. Supreme Court's Roe v. Wade decision, she announced her candidacy for Michigan governor in the 2026 race to succeed incumbent Democratic governor Gretchen Whitmer, who is term-limited and ineligible to run again. Her campaign was endorsed by United Auto Workers in June 2026, alongside Abdul El-Sayed's campaign in the 2026 U.S. Senate election. Benson and her running mate Winnie Brinks were the first all-female gubernatorial ticket in Michigan.

Benson won the election, defeating Republican nominee John James; her win meant Michigan would have consecutive female governors for the first time.

== Personal life ==
Benson married Ryan Friedrichs, whom she met while they were both students at Harvard, in 2006. Friedrichs is a U.S. Army veteran and Benson has written about the isolation she experienced during his enlistment. In 2012, she founded Military Spouses of Michigan to provide support and build a network for military families in the state, noting the lack of an active duty base in Michigan. Benson and Friedrichs have one son.

Friedrichs is a vice president for Related Companies, a New York-based real estate firm owned by billionaire Stephen M. Ross, who is one of Benson's larger campaign donors. He was a lobbyist but terminated his lobbying license when Benson launched her gubernatorial campaign. His employer is pushing a controversial AI data center in Saline Township and Friedrichs has said he will recuse himself from any projects before the state should Benson be elected. The Michigan Advance wrote that "the connection raised concerns about whether Benson could be impartial and free from influence given that Related Digital has such a large business interest before the state."

Benson is a runner and has completed more than 30 marathons. In 2016, she completed her second Boston Marathon and became one of a handful of women in history to finish the race while eight months pregnant.

== Bibliography ==
- Benson, Jocelyn (2013). State Secretaries of State: Guardians of the Democratic Process. Ashgate Publishing. ISBN 9781409496991.
- Benson, Jocelyn (2025). The Purposeful Warrior: Standing Up for What's Right When the Stakes Are High. Penguin Publishing Group. ISBN 9780593994214.

== Electoral history ==
2010 Michigan Secretary of State election
Party	Candidate	Votes	%	±%
Republican	Ruth Johnson	1,608,270	50.68%	−5.55%
Democratic	Jocelyn Benson	1,434,796	45.22%	+3.26%
Libertarian	Scotty Boman	58,044	1.83%	N/A
U.S. Taxpayers'	Robert Gale	41,727	1.17%	N/A
Green	John A. La Pietra	30,411	0.96%	−0.93%
Total votes		3,173,248	100.0%	N/A
Republican hold				

2018 Michigan Secretary of State election
Party	Candidate	Votes	%	±%
Democratic	Jocelyn Benson	2,203,611	52.87%	+9.93%
Republican	Mary Treder Lang	1,833,609	44.00%	−9.53%
Libertarian	Gregory Stempfle	81,697	1.96%	−0.02%
U.S. Taxpayers'	Robert Gale	48,724	1.17%	+0.05%
Total votes		4,162,389	100.0%	N/A
Democratic gain from Republican				

2022 Michigan Secretary of State election
Party	Candidate	Votes	%	±%
Democratic	Jocelyn Benson (incumbent)	2,467,859	55.86%	+2.96%
Republican	Kristina Karamo	1,852,510	41.93%	−2.05%
Libertarian	Gregory Scott Stempfle	52,982	1.20%	−0.76%
Constitution	Christine Schwartz	27,937	0.63%	−0.54%
Green	Larry James Hutchinson Jr.	16,615	0.38%	N/A
Total votes		4,417,903	100.0%	N/A
Democratic hold				

== See also ==
- List of female governors in the United States

Party political offices
Preceded by Carmella Sabaugh	Democratic nominee for Secretary of State of Michigan; 2010	Succeeded by Godfrey Dillard
Preceded by Godfrey Dillard	Democratic nominee for Secretary of State of Michigan; 2018, 2022	Succeeded by Garlin Gilchrist
Preceded by Gretchen Whitmer	Democratic nominee for Governor of Michigan; 2026	Most recent
Political offices
Preceded by Ruth Johnson	Secretary of State of Michigan; 2019–present	Incumbent
Preceded by Gretchen Whitmer	Governor of Michigan; Taking office 2027	Elect
