= Robert P. Eldredge =

American politician

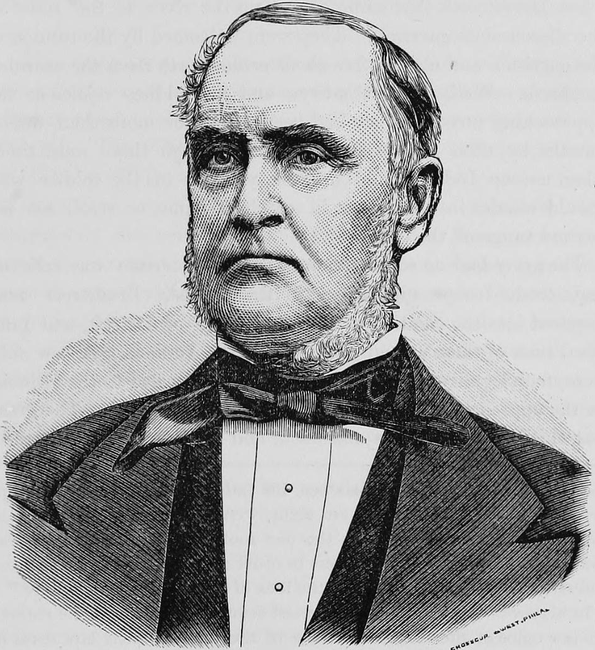

4th Michigan Secretary of State
- In office 1842–1846
- Governor: John S. Barry
- Preceded by: Thomas Rowland
- Succeeded by: Gideon O. Whittemore

Personal details
- Born: 1808 Greenwich, New York, U.S.
- Died: November 25, 1884 (aged 75–76) Mount Clemens, Michigan, U.S.
- Party: Democratic

Robert P. Eldredge (1808 – November 25, 1884) was an American politician and lawyer who served as the fourth Secretary of State for the State of Michigan.

Robert Eldredge was born in 1808 in the town of Greenwich in Washington County, New York. He travelled to the then Territory of Michigan in 1826, becoming the first lawyer of Macomb County before his appointment to Secretary of State for the State of Michigan.

== Political career ==
Eldredge served as Secretary of State for the State of Michigan from 1842 to 1846 under Governor John S. Barry. Following this, he served two terms in the Michigan State Senate, from 1847 to 1848, where he represented the 1st district.

Political offices
Preceded by Thomas Rowland	Secretary of State of Michigan; 1842–1846	Succeeded by Gideon O. Whittemore
