= Thomas Rowland (politician) =

Secretary of State (1794-1849)

3rd Michigan Secretary of State
- In office 1840–1842
- Governor: William Woodbridge; James Wright Gordon
- Preceded by: Randolph Manning
- Succeeded by: Robert P. Eldredge

Personal details
- Born: 1784 Uniontown, Fayette, Pennsylvania
- Died: August 13, 1849 (aged 64–65) Detroit, Wayne, Michigan
- Party: Whig

Thomas Rowland (1784 – August 13, 1849) was an American politician and soldier who served as the third Secretary of State for the State of Michigan. He was the first and only Whig Secretary of State for Michigan. He served in this position from 1840 to 1842.

Thomas Rowland was born in 1784 in the town of Uniontown in Fayette, Pennsylvania. He died on August 13, 1849.
