= Murder of Tara Lynn Grant =

American 2007 murder victim

- Grant in 2006
- Date: 2 March 2007 (body discovered)
- Location: Macomb County, Michigan, U.S.
- Arrests: Stephen Grant
- Sentence: 50–80 years imprisonment

Tara Lynn Grant (28 June 1972 − 9 February 2007) was a married American woman, mother of two children from Macomb County, Michigan, and a successful consultant at Washington Group International. She became nationally known as the victim of murder by her husband, Stephen Grant, in February 2007.

The case gained widespread coverage in Michigan and nationally because her husband fled while the police were searching their house, had dismembered her body, and made a confession to police that was released in April 2007 before the trial later that year. Stephen Grant was convicted in December 2007 of premeditated homicide and mutilation, and sentenced to 50 years in prison. Both the conviction and sentence were upheld through appeals.

== Background ==
Tara Lynn Grant was born in Michigan in June 1972. She had a sister Alicia, and they attended public schools. Tara Lynn graduated from Michigan State University, where she earned a bachelor's degree in business. She soon started working for the Downtown Detroit Office of Washington Group International. Her job required her to travel frequently for business, and she had a rising career at the Boise, Idaho-based company.

She married Stephen Grant, of Macomb County, Michigan, and at the time of her 2007 death, they had two children together – a 7-year-old daughter and a 3-year-old son. At that time, she was the principal wage earner and he cared for the children, while also working in a tool and die shop. Their combined salaries allowed them to also have an au pair from Germany living at the house.

== Disappearance ==
On 14 February 2007, Valentine's Day, Stephen Grant called the Macomb County Sheriff's Office in the county seat, Mount Clemens, Michigan, to report that his wife, Tara Lynn Grant, had been missing for five days. In his account, Grant said that this was not the first time his 34-year-old wife had left home, which was why he had not immediately reported her missing. He said that on the evening of 9 February, he had overheard Tara talking with someone on the phone, saying, "I'll meet you at the end of the driveway". He said he saw her get into a dark-colored car that drove off, and that he had not seen or heard from her since.

Over the following two weeks, Stephen Grant made numerous media appearances, at times accusing authorities of harassment. The day after reporting Tara missing, Grant was stopped by police and arrested for driving with a suspended license. He accused police of using the traffic arrest as an excuse to take him into custody to question him further about Tara's disappearance. Police denied the accusation. They were holding daily press conferences during the search for Tara.

According to police, Stephen Grant was less than cooperative with them during their early investigation. He initially refused to answer questions but agreed to take a polygraph test, if it was administered by someone other than the police.

On 2 March 2007, police executed a search warrant at the home of Stephen and Tara Grant in Washington Township, Michigan. They found a dismembered human torso, believed to be that of Tara Grant, stored in a plastic garbage bag in the garage. They immediately gained an "open murder" arrest warrant for Stephen Grant, who had already fled the scene. They had not yet determined the degree of the charges.

Two days later, after tracking a cell phone call that Stephen made to his sister, Griem, police found the suspect 225 miles away in northern Michigan's Wilderness State Park. He had taken liquor and pills from his sister's house, intending to commit suicide. After driving to the park, he spent the night in the freezing cold, with no outer clothing for protection. After being taken into custody, he was airlifted by helicopter to Northern Michigan Hospital in Petoskey for treatment of hypothermia.

In a press conference on 5 March, Mark Hackel, Sheriff of Macomb County, discussed a confession that Grant had made to them in the hospital. He confessed to police in detail about strangling his wife Tara to death on the night of 9 February, after an argument in which he had accused her of spending too much time with a co-worker. She had returned that day from a business trip to Puerto Rico. Their two children were at home but were asleep in bed.

Grant later dismembered her body at his father's tool and die shop, USG Babbitt. He took the remains to nearby Stony Creek Metro Park in Shelby Township and disposed of body parts there. But after learning the police planned to search the park, Grant recovered the torso of his wife, and hid these remains in black plastic garbage bags in their garage.

After being released from the hospital, Grant was transported to Macomb County by a convoy of Macomb County Sheriff's deputies. On 6 March 2007 Grant was formally charged with count one homicide: murder in the first degree that is premeditated, and with count two disinterment and/or mutilation of a dead body. The charge of count one homicide in the first degree that is premeditated is punishable by life in prison. The charge of disinterment, dismemberment, is punishable by up to 10 years in prison or a $5,000 fine or both.

On 13 April 2007, the Macomb County Prosecutor released Stephen Grant's two-part confession publicly, a transcript of the interview with detectives and his own handwritten confession. Details included his arguing with his wife over his jealousy about her spending time with a co-worker. He also said he had been having an affair with the family's 19-year-old au pair from Germany. As the argument escalated, Grant strangled Tara in anger. He also described his efforts to dismember her body and hide it, after he had notified the police of her disappearance.

== Media coverage ==
Tara Grant's murder gained nationwide media coverage. During the search, the Macomb County Sheriff's Department held a daily press conference until they found her body. Grant's escape into the wilderness also captured their attention. After Stephen Grant was arrested, and had confessed the details of his crimes, Larry King Live and Court TV both covered the homicide and investigation.

== Verdict ==
On Friday, 21 December 2007, Stephen Grant was found guilty on the charge of murder in the second degree. On Thursday, 21 February 2008, he was sentenced to a minimum of fifty years in prison. On 30 March 2010, Grant lost his final appeal in state court, leaving intact the original sentence of 50–80 years. The Michigan Supreme Court affirmed a lower court decision that found Grant's trial was not unduly prejudiced by pretrial publicity in the widely covered case, nor was Grant improperly denied access to an attorney before making a confession to police.

In March 2015, U.S. District Court Judge David Lawson denied Grant's "petition for writ of habeas corpus." Grant had claimed that police improperly obtained his confession while he was being treated in a hospital for hypothermia and exposure; the judge also denied that pre-trial publicity made it impossible for him to receive a fair trial. Lawson said that officials in Macomb County took "extraordinary measures" to ensure that a fair and impartial jury was seated.

== Aftermath and representation in other media ==
Tara's family have said that they will allow her two children to read their father's confession after they reach adulthood. Tara Grant's sister Alicia Standerfer was authorized by the court to represent Tara's estate. She filed a wrongful death civil suit against Stephen Grant. Standerfer and her husband Eric are rearing the two young Grant children at their home in Ohio.

On 13 June 2008, Stephen's father, William Allen "Al" Grant, committed suicide in Capac, Michigan, from a self-inflicted gunshot wound. He died at Port Huron Hospital. A man who had a neighboring tool shop said that William Grant never seemed to recover from the actions of his son and destruction of the family. Al Grant had been married three times, and widowed twice. He was survived by a married daughter and her husband, in addition to the two Grant children.

Since Stephen Grant's conviction and sentencing, at least two books have been published about the case: A Slaying in the Suburbs: The Tara Grant Murder (2009), by Andrea Billups and Steve Miller, includes interviews with Stephen Grant recorded at Michigan's Bellamy Creek Correctional Facility. Limb From Limb (2009) was written by Detroit News crime reporter George Hunter, who covered the case from the beginning, and former Detroit News editor Melissa Preddy.

Several TV series featured this case: the Biography Channel had it as an episode in the Casanova Killers series, Season 1, Episode 3. The show Deadly Sins covered it in season 5, episode 5, "Michigan Wolverines". The Investigation Discovery series Scorned: Love Kills featured "The Au Pair Affair" as Season 1, Episode 8, aired March 2012. The series Betrayed ran the episode "Beware The Au Pair" in April 2019.

In 2009, a YouTube video was uploaded showing reporter Hema Mullur laughing while reporting on the murder and Stephen Grant's capture due to viewing Grant's wide-eyed mugshot, which would ultimately go viral. Mullur later apologized for the incident.

== See also ==
- List of homicides in Michigan
- List of solved missing person cases (2000s)
