= 1990 Michigan Secretary of State election =

- November 6, 1990
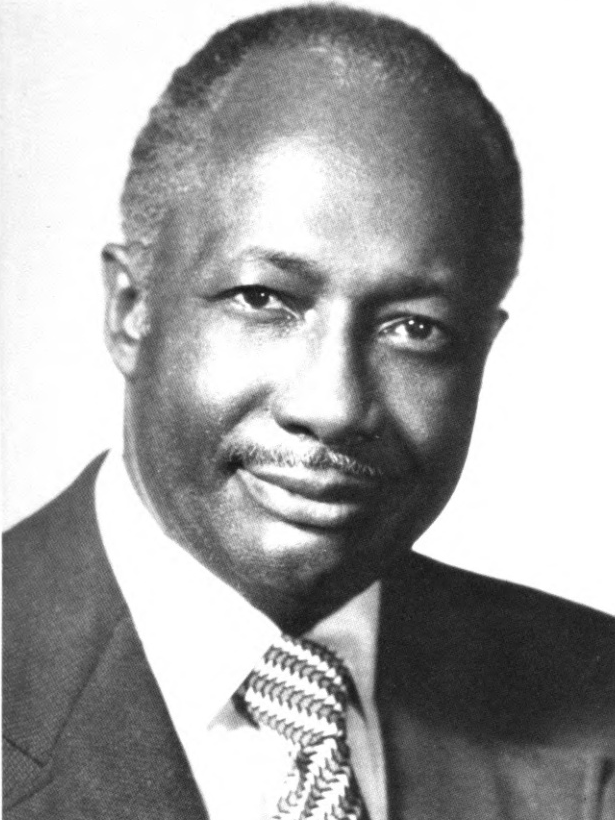

Nominee	Richard H. Austin	Judy Miller
Party	Democratic	Republican
Popular vote	1,511,095	981,027
Percentage	60.63%	39.36%
- County results Austin: 50–60% 60–70% 70–80% Miller: 50–60% 60–70%
Secretary of State before election
Richard H. Austin
Democratic
Elected Secretary of State
Richard H. Austin
Democratic

The 1990 Michigan Secretary of State election was held on November 6, 1990. Incumbent Democrat Richard H. Austin defeated Republican nominee Judy Miller with 60.63% of the vote. As of 2026, this was the last time a man was elected Secretary of State in Michigan. After 1990, Democrats would not win another Michigan Secretary of State election again until 2018.

== General election ==
=== Candidates ===
Major party candidates

- Richard H. Austin, Democratic
- Judy Miller, Republican

=== Results ===
Michigan Secretary of State election, 1990
Party	Candidate	Votes	%
Democratic	Richard H. Austin (incumbent)	1,511,095	60.63
Republican	Judy Miller	981,027	39.36
Write-ins		155	0.01
Total votes		2,492,277	100
Democratic hold			
