= Barbara McQuade =

American lawyer

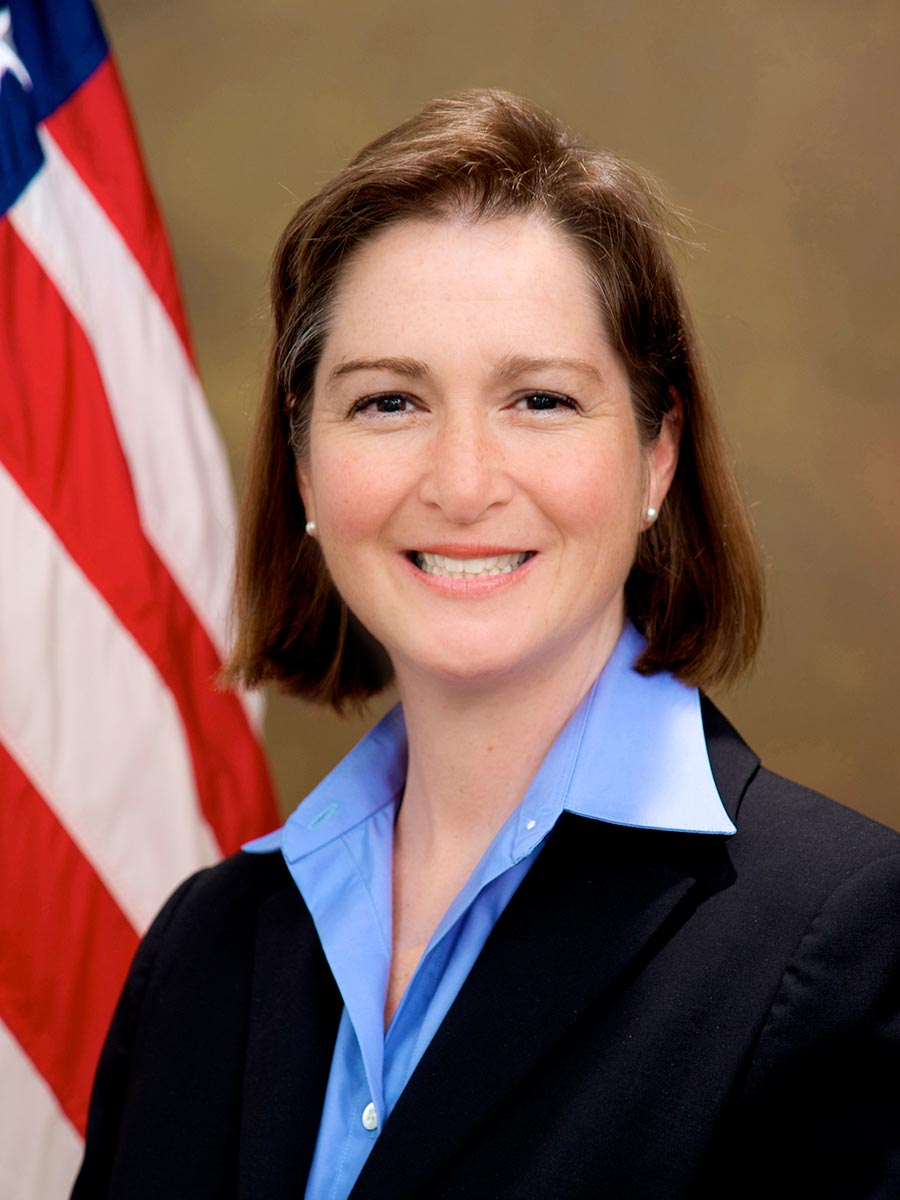
- Official portrait, 2010

United States Attorney for the Eastern District of Michigan
- In office January 4, 2010 – March 10, 2017
- President: Barack Obama; Donald Trump
- Preceded by: Stephen Murphy III
- Succeeded by: Matthew J. Schneider

Personal details
- Born: December 22, 1964 (age 61) Detroit, Michigan, U.S.
- Education: University of Michigan (BA, JD)

Barbara Lynn McQuade (born December 22, 1964) is an American lawyer who served as the United States Attorney for the Eastern District of Michigan from 2010 to 2017. As part of President Donald Trump's 2017 dismissal of U.S. attorneys, she stepped down in March 2017. She is a professor of law at the University of Michigan Law School, the author of Attack from Within and a legal analyst for NBC News and MSNBC. She also cohosts the podcast "#SistersInLaw."

== Early life and education ==
McQuade was born in Detroit, Michigan. She received her undergraduate degree in 1987 from the University of Michigan and her J.D. in 1991 from the University of Michigan Law School.

== Career ==
Before joining the U.S. Attorney's office, McQuade practiced law at the firm of Butzel Long in Detroit and served as a law clerk for Judge Bernard A. Friedman on the U.S. District Court for the Eastern District of Michigan.

McQuade started her career as an assistant U.S. Attorney in the Eastern District of Michigan from 1998 until becoming U.S. Attorney in that same district. She was also a professor of law at University of Detroit Mercy School of Law from 2003 to 2009.

McQuade was appointed by President Barack Obama and started her term as U.S. Attorney on January 4, 2010. Upon taking office in January 2010, McQuade restructured the office for the first time in more than 35 years to align attorney resources with the priorities of the district: national security, violent crime, public corruption, civil rights and financial fraud, mortgage fraud, health care fraud, and environmental crimes.

During McQuade's tenure as U.S. Attorney, the office reached convictions in several high-profile cases, including the case of former Detroit Mayor Kwame Kilpatrick on public corruption charges; the conviction and life sentence of Umar Farouk Abdulmutallab, the would-be al-Qaeda bomber behind the 2009 Christmas Day bomb plot to destroy an airplane in flight from the Netherlands to Detroit Metropolitan Wayne County Airport; the conviction of a former Michigan Supreme Court justice on bank fraud charges; and the convictions of former employees for stealing trade secrets from Detroit automakers. McQuade also joined with other law enforcement leaders to launch Detroit One, a violence reduction strategy and community partnership.

McQuade served on the Attorney General's Advisory Committee and was the co-chair of the Terrorism and National Security Subcommittee. She also served on subcommittees addressing civil rights and border security.

She was the first woman to serve as U.S. Attorney for the Eastern District of Michigan. She served as deputy chief of the National Security Unit, where she prosecuted cases involving terrorism financing, foreign agents, export violations, and threats. During her career as a federal prosecutor, McQuade prosecuted cases involving violent crime, fraud, and racketeering.

She helped expose Detroit-area cancer specialist Farid Fata as the mastermind of one of the largest health care frauds in American history. Fata pleaded guilty to his crimes in 2015 and was sentenced to 45 years in prison.

In 2017, McQuade became a regular contributor to MSNBC, initially commenting primarily on purported scandals related to President Donald Trump, though the range of topics she analyzes has become broader over time. Since 2021, she also co-hosts the #SistersInLaw podcast with Jill Wine-Banks, Joyce Vance and Kimberly Atkins Stohr.

== Awards and recognition ==
McQuade has been recognized by the Detroit Free Press with the Neal Shine Award for Exemplary Regional Leadership, The Detroit News with the Michiganian of the Year Award, Crain's Detroit Business as a Newsmaker of the Year and one of Detroit's Most Influential Women, and the Detroit Branch NAACP and Arab American Civil Rights League with their Tribute to Justice Award.

== Works ==
- Attack from Within: How Disinformation is Sabotaging America, was published on February 27, 2024.
- The Fix: Saving America from the Corruption of a Mob-Style Government, was published June 2, 2026

== See also ==
- 2017 dismissal of U.S. attorneys

Legal offices
Preceded by Stephen Joseph Murphy III	United States Attorney for the Eastern District of Michigan; 2010–2017	Succeeded by Matthew J. Schneider
