= Matthew J. Schneider =

American attorney

Matthew Schneider
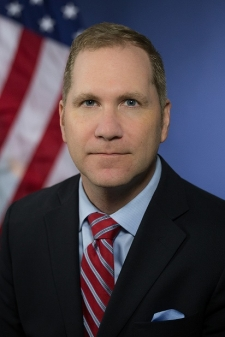

United States Attorney for the Eastern District of Michigan
- In office January 5, 2018 – February 1, 2021; Acting: January 5, 2018 – May 4, 2018
- President: Donald Trump; Joe Biden
- Preceded by: Barbara McQuade
- Succeeded by: Saima Shafiq Mohsin (acting)

Personal details
- Party: Republican
- Education: James Madison College (BA); University of Michigan (JD)

Matthew James Schneider is an American attorney who served as the United States Attorney for the Eastern District of Michigan from 2018 to 2021. In 2021, he joined the law firm Honigman LLP as a partner.

== Biography ==
He earned his Bachelor of Arts from Michigan State University's James Madison College and his Juris Doctor from the University of Michigan Law School.

Schneider was a senior advisor and Assistant General Counsel in the Office of Management and Budget and an associate at Wiley Rein. From 2003 to 2011, he served as an Assistant United States Attorney in Detroit, where he prosecuted violent crime and public corruption cases. He has also served as Chief of Staff and General Counsel for the Michigan Supreme Court. He previously was Chief Deputy Attorney General for the State of Michigan, and Chief Legal Counsel for the Michigan Attorney General's office.

Beginning in 2012, Schneider has been an adjunct professor at Michigan State University Law School.

=== United States Attorney ===
On January 5, 2018, he was appointed by United States Attorney General Jeff Sessions to serve as interim United States Attorney. On June 25, 2018, his nomination was sent to the United States Senate. On January 2, 2019, his nomination was confirmed by voice vote.

In April 2020, U.S. Attorney General William Barr appointed Schneider to lead the effort to examine state and local emergency restrictions that had been imposed in response to the COVID-19 pandemic. Specifically he and his team were to identify where such restrictions unduly impinged upon "the constitutional rights and civil liberties of individual citizens."

On January 21, 2021, Schneider announced he would resign on February 1.

== Personal life ==
Schneider lives in Saline, Michigan, which is just west of Detroit. He is married to Rebecca Schneider and they have two children.
