= Ruth Johnson =

American politician (born 1955)

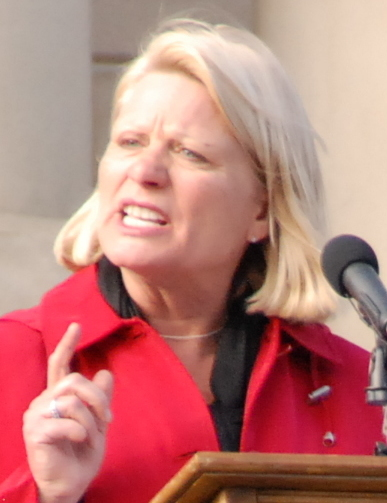
- Johnson in 2011

Member of the Michigan Senate
- Incumbent
- Assumed office January 1, 2019
- Preceded by: David B. Robertson
- Constituency: 14th district (2019–2022); 24th district (2023–present)

42nd Secretary of State of Michigan
- In office January 1, 2011 – January 1, 2019
- Governor: Rick Snyder
- Preceded by: Terri Lynn Land
- Succeeded by: Jocelyn Benson

Member of the Michigan House of Representatives from the 46th district
- In office January 1, 1999 – January 1, 2005
- Preceded by: Tom Middleton
- Succeeded by: Jim Marleau

Personal details
- Born: January 8, 1955 (age 71) Holly, Michigan, U.S.
- Party: Republican
- Education: Oakland Community College (attended); Oakland University (BA); Wayne State University (MA)

Ruth Johnson (born January 8, 1955) is an American businesswoman and politician currently serving as a member of the Michigan Senate since 2019. She was the 42nd Secretary of State of Michigan from 2011 to 2019 and a member of the Michigan House of Representatives from 1999 to 2005. She is a Republican.

== Background ==
Johnson, of Holly, was a former public school teacher, small business owner, and public official in a suburban area immediately north of Detroit with a population of more than one million, prior to her election as secretary of state in November 2010. She was elected to the Oakland County Board of Commissioners in 1988 and served for 10 years. Johnson was elected to the Michigan House of Representatives in 1998, and re-elected in 2000 and 2002; term limits meant she was ineligible for a fourth term. She was elected Oakland County Clerk and Register of Deeds in 2004, upsetting incumbent G. William Caddell in the Republican Primary and defeated Democratic nominee Jason Ellenburg in the general election. She became the first woman clerk in Oakland County's 176-year history. Johnson became popular for her community outreach event and parties.

In August 2006, Johnson was selected by Grand Rapids businessman and Republican gubernatorial nominee Dick DeVos as his running mate, becoming the GOP nominee for Lieutenant Governor of Michigan. DeVos and Johnson lost the general election to the incumbent Democratic ticket of Gov. Jennifer Granholm and Lt. Gov. John Cherry. In 2007, Johnson endorsed Sen. John McCain's bid for the 2008 Republican presidential nomination and served as the Oakland County Chair for McCain's Michigan campaign. Johnson was re-elected County Clerk in 2008, defeating Democrat Sheila Smith.

== Secretary of State ==
As secretary, Johnson promoted motorcycle safety initiatives, such as wearing high-visibility gear and encouraging riders to get a cycle endorsement. Johnson herself is a licensed motorcycle rider and often rides in to motorcycle-related news conferences. Johnson pushed her departments to foster safe driving among teens. After reviewing the department's teen driver licensing program, National Highway Traffic Safety Administration offered recommendations for improvement but overall gave the program high praise for combating the leading cause of death for teens in the United States. Like her time as Oakland County Clerk, Ruth Johnson because popular for community outreach events, and viral marketing campaigns

In 2014, Michigan was named the best state in the nation for registering qualified U.S. citizens at state motor-vehicle offices, according to USA Today. Also in 2014, the University of Michigan's Center for Local, State and Urban Policy found that the Secretary of State's Office was rated the second best state agency for job performance by community leaders. That same year, the state's Mackinac Bridge license plate was named the best designed plate in the world.

In July 2017, Ruth Johnson agreed to provide Michigan voter registration information to a federal commission created by Trump to investigate alleged illegal voting in the 2016 election. Johnson indicated she would only provide basic public voter information.

== 2010 Secretary of State election ==
In 2010, she won the Republican nomination for secretary of state at the party's state convention. Her opponents were Paul Scott, Michelle McManus, Anne Norlander and Cameron Brown. She went on to win the general election defeating Democrat Jocelyn Benson, Libertarian Scotty Boman, Green John Anthony La Pietra, and US Taxpayer Robert Gale.

== 2014 Secretary of State election ==
In 2014, Johnson defeated Detroit lawyer and Democrat Godfrey Dillard, Libertarian James Lewis, US Taxpayers Robert Gale, and Natural Law Jason Gatties to earn a second term by 10.6 percentage points, receiving 1,649,047 votes to the defeated candidates 1,431,748 votes. She drew more votes than any other Republican candidate on the ballot.

== 2018 and 2022 Michigan State Senate elections ==
After her tenure as Secretary of State, she was elected as a Michigan State Senator in 2018 and re-elected again in 2022. In September 2020, Johnson filed a lawsuit against Secretary of State Jocelyn Benson for allowing votes postmarked before election day to be counted after election day. The lawsuit was later dismissed.

== Electoral history ==
Michigan House of Representatives 46th District Republican Primary Election, 1998
Party	Candidate	Votes	%
Republican	Ruth Johnson	3,639	40.73
Republican	Jeff Gallant	3,141	35.15
Republican	Patricia Woods	1,885	21.10
Republican	John Lauve	270	3.02

Michigan House of Representatives 46th District Election, 1998
Party	Candidate	Votes	%
Republican	Ruth Johnson	21,739	67.54
Democratic	Roxanne La Montaine	8,571	26.63
Libertarian	Mark Carney	1,876	5.83

Michigan House of Representatives 46th District Election, 2000
Party	Candidate	Votes	%
Republican	Ruth Johnson (inc.)	29,119	64.48
Democratic	Patrick Doyon	13,928	30.84
U.S. Taxpayers	Sean Patrick Sullivan	2,110	4.67

Michigan House of Representatives 46th District Republican Primary Election, 2002
Party	Candidate	Votes	%
Republican	Ruth Johnson (inc.)	3,833	68.95
Republican	John Lauve	1,726	31.05

Michigan House of Representatives 46th District Election, 2002
Party	Candidate	Votes	%
Republican	Ruth Johnson (inc.)	21,582	70.88
Democratic	Robert Reading	8,866	29.12

Michigan Secretary of State Election, 2010
Party	Candidate	Votes	%
Republican	Ruth Johnson	1,608,270	50.68
Democratic	Jocelyn Michelle Benson	1,434,796	45.22
Libertarian	Scotty Boman	58,044	1.83
U.S. Taxpayers	Robert Gale	41,727	1.31
Green	John Anthony La Pietra	30,411	0.96

Michigan Secretary of State Election, 2014
Party	Candidate	Votes	%
Republican	Ruth Johnson (inc.)	1,649,047	53.53
Democratic	Godfrey Dillard	1,323,004	42.94
Libertarian	James Lewis	61,112	1.98
U.S. Taxpayers	Robert Gale	34,447	1.12
Natural Law	Jason Robert Gatties	13,185	0.43

Party political offices
Preceded by Loren Bennett	Republican nominee for Lieutenant Governor of Michigan; 2006	Succeeded by Brian Calley
Preceded by Terri Lynn Land	Republican nominee for Secretary of State of Michigan; 2010, 2014	Succeeded by Mary Treder Lang
Political offices
Preceded by Terri Lynn Land	Secretary of State of Michigan; 2011–2019	Succeeded by Jocelyn Benson
