= Mark Hackel =

American politician (born 1962)

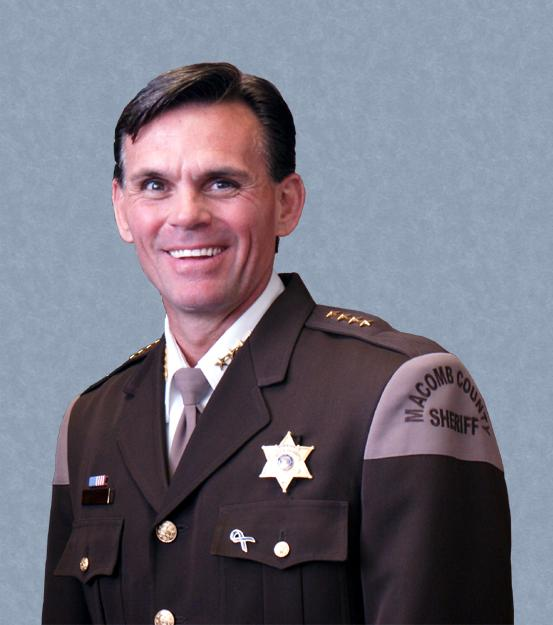

Executive of Macomb County
- Incumbent
- Assumed office January 1, 2011
- Preceded by: Position established

Personal details
- Born: May 15, 1962 (age 64) Detroit, Michigan, U.S.
- Party: Democratic
- Spouse: Tracie Damschroder (m. 2014)
- Education: Wayne State University (BA); Central Michigan University (MPA)

Mark Allen Hackel (born May 15, 1962) is an American politician serving as the county executive of Macomb County, Michigan, since the position was established in 2011. A member of the Democratic Party, Hackel previously served as the sheriff of Macomb County from 2001 until 2010.

== Background ==
Mark Hackel was born in Detroit, Michigan, to Ada and William H. Hackel. He is the second of three sons. He attended public schools. By high school his family had moved to Sterling Heights, Michigan, where he graduated from Sterling Heights High School.

Hackel followed his father into a career in law enforcement. His brother, William Hackel III, became an attorney, and in July 2009 was appointed as judge of the second division Michigan's 42nd District Court by Governor Jennifer Granholm.

Mark Hackel earned a Bachelor of Arts degree from Wayne State University in Criminal Justice, and joined the sheriff's department in Macomb County in 1981. He later earned a master's degree in public administration from Central Michigan University. While working at the sheriff's department, he also received training at the FBI National Academy and the U.S. Secret Service's dignitary protection school.

Hackel has taught classes in criminal justice and leadership at Macomb Community College and Wayne State University.

== Macomb County Sheriff ==
Hackel was one of 15 candidates to run in the primary on August 8, 2000, for the Democratic Party nomination for Macomb County Sheriff. Likely benefiting from name recognition, he captured 46% of the vote. He defeated Republican Steve Thomas in the general election in November 2000, winning 52% of the vote to become county sheriff. Hackel won re-election in 2004 and 2008, defeating Republican candidate Kristi Dean both times. In his 2008 victory, Hackel received 78.4% of the vote and set a new record of 314,778 total votes for a county-wide elected office.

In early 2007 Hackel and his office received national attention during their investigation of the homicide of Tara Grant, whose body was found dismembered. Her husband, Stephen Grant, confessed to police and was charged with murder. Grant was convicted of second-degree murder in his wife's death in December 2007 and was sentenced to 50 to 80 years in prison by Macomb County Circuit Court Judge Diane Druzinski in February 2008.

Hackel resigned as sheriff on December 31, 2010, to begin his term as county executive.

== County Executive ==
On December 3, 2008, Hackel announced that he had formed an exploratory committee looking at the possibility of a run for governor of Michigan in 2010. He later decided to run instead for the new position of Macomb County Executive, which had been approved by voters in 2008. Unopposed in the Democratic primary, Hackel won the nomination.

On November 2, 2010, he was elected as the first Macomb County Executive, receiving 66 percent of the vote and defeating Republican Randell Shaffer, who had 31 percent, and Libertarian Erin Stahl, who had 3 percent. Hackel resigned his position as sheriff on December 31, 2010, and took office as county executive for a four-year term starting on January 1, 2011. On December 7, 2010, Hackel named Mark Deldin, Chippewa Valley Schools Superintendent, as his deputy county executive.

In November 2014, Hackel defeated Republican David Novak to win a second-term as county executive, taking 69 percent of almost 260,000 votes.

He easily won a third term in November 2018.

On November 8, 2022, Mark Hackel defeated Nicholyn Brandenburg, in a landslide victory, to win a fourth term.

== Relations with the Democratic Party ==
While Hackel has been successful in winning Democratic Party nominations and general elections, his relations with the party and other candidates have been at best ambivalent at times. He has crossed party lines to endorse Republican candidates for some county and state offices, offending some party regulars. In addition, some fellow Democrats in Macomb County have said that he is too willing to work with Republicans, including Gov. Rick Snyder. In 2013, Hackel instructed the County Clerk's office not to identify him as a Democrat in the county directory of elected officials.

During Michigan's gubernatorial election in 2014, Hackel originally said that he would stay neutral, rather than endorsing the presumptive Democratic nominee, former US Congressman Mark Schauer. Hackel eventually "reluctantly" endorsed Schauer, who was defeated by the incumbent Snyder.

In 2016, Hackel crossed party lines by endorsing Republican U.S. Representative Candice Miller, a former Macomb County Treasurer with whom he had worked, in her bid to unseat 6-term Democratic incumbent Anthony Marrocco in the race for Macomb County Public Works Commissioner. He said, "The point is to endorse people that you believe are the ones that are going to be the most effective in making things happen. The working relationship I would get with a person like Candice Miller would far exceed any expectations the public would have or that I would have."

In 2018, despite having endorsed the statewide Democratic ticket, Hackel refused to back Fred Miller, the Democratic nominee for the 2018 special election for Macomb County Clerk. Hackel initially backed state senator Steve Bieda in the Democratic primary. After Miller won the nomination, Hackel supported Miller's Republican opponent, Lisa Sinclair, although they had never met. Hackel said that he felt Miller and County Clerk Carmella Sabaugh had conspired to "rig" the 2016 clerk election. Miller filed to run minutes before Michigan's deadline, in order to appear on the August primary ballot, while at the same time, Sabaugh withdrew from the race minutes before Michigan's deadline to be removed from the ballot, essentially leaving the Democratic nomination open to Miller.

In the midst of the COVID-19 pandemic in the United States, Hackel expressed support for a citizen-backed initiative to repeal a 1945 law that gave Democratic Gov. Gretchen Whitmer powers to declare a state of emergency without the consent of the state legislature. Whitmer had used the emergency powers to keep many sections of the Michigan economy completely or partially closed during the pandemic.

== Political future ==
Hackel has thrice flirted with running for Governor of Michigan, considering running in the 2010, 2014, and 2018 elections. He put out early feelers in 2008 and in 2012. Hackel eventually decided to run for and was elected as Macomb County Executive in 2010. The Republican candidate, Rick Snyder, won the governorship.

In October 2012, Hackel was reportedly considering a run at the governorship in 2014. But in January 2013, Hackel announced that he would not run for governor in 2014, but would instead focus on running for re-election as county executive.

Again in May 2017, Hackel suggested he might run for governor, either as a Democrat or independent. He eventually ran for a third term as county executive, and again won the primary and general elections by a wide margin.

== Electoral history ==
2000 Macomb County Sheriff Democratic primary
Party	Candidate	Votes	%
Democratic	Mark Hackel	22,670	46.1
Democratic	Ronald Lupo	11,153	22.7
Democratic	Jim Haggerty	5,529	11.2
Democratic	Gregory Stone	1,505	3.1
Democratic	Charles Missig	1,380	2.8
Democratic	Ronald Krueger	1,247	2.5
Democratic	Eugene Groesbeck	1,191	2.4
Democratic	Nicole Chase	1,183	2.4
Democratic	Alan Shepperd	1,006	2.0
Democratic	Michael Locke	953	1.9
Democratic	Christian Pfeffer	392	0.8
Democratic	Ronald Eldridge	362	0.7
Democratic	Ron Wolber	359	0.7
Democratic	Jimmie Byrd	270	0.5

2000 Macomb County Sheriff election
Party	Candidate	Votes	%	±%
Democratic	Mark Hackel	172,466	52.0	−15.1
Republican	Steve Thomas	150,990	45.5	+12.6
Libertarian	Albert Titran	4,122	1.2	N/A
Reform	Joe Grahm	4,093	1.2	N/A
Majority		21,476	6.5	−27.7
Turnout		331,671		+18.1
Democratic hold				

2004 Macomb County Sheriff election
Party	Candidate	Votes	%	±%
Democratic	Mark Hackel (I)	275,723	71.9	+19.9
Republican	Kristi Dean	107,848	28.1	−17.4
Majority		167,875	43.8	+37.3
Turnout		383,571		+15.6
Democratic hold				

2008 Macomb County Sheriff election
Party	Candidate	Votes	%	±%
Democratic	Mark Hackel (I)	314,816	78.4	+6.5
Republican	Kristi Dean	86,810	21.6	−6.5
Majority		228,006	56.8	+13.0
Turnout		401,626		+21.1
Democratic hold				

2010 Macomb County Executive election
Party	Candidate	Votes	%
Democratic	Mark Hackel	174,245	65.8
Republican	Randel Shaffer	81,981	31.0
Libertarian	Erin Stahl	8,490	3.2
Majority		92,264	34.9
Turnout		264,716	

2014 Macomb County Executive election
Party	Candidate	Votes	%	±%
Democratic	Mark Hackel (I)	179,041	69.0	+3.2
Republican	David J. Novak	80,290	31.0	0.0
Majority		98,751	38.0	+3.1
Turnout		259,331		−2.0
Democratic hold				

2018 Macomb County Executive election, Democratic primary
Party	Candidate	Votes	%	
Democratic	Mark Hackel (I)	71,206	83.1	
Democratic	Arnold Simkus	14,444	16.9	
Majority		56,762	66.2	−33.8
Turnout		85,650		+111.8

2018 Macomb County Executive election
Party	Candidate	Votes	%	±%
Democratic	Mark Hackel (incumbent)	231,389	67.2	−1.8
Republican	Joseph M. Hunt	113,121	32.8	+1.8
Majority		100,268	34.4	−3.6
Turnout		344,510		+32.8
Democratic hold				

2022 Macomb County Executive election
Party	Candidate	Votes	%	±%
Democratic	Mark Hackel (incumbent)	229,940	61.5	−5.7
Republican	Nicholyn Brandenburg	144,207	38.5	+5.7
Turnout		374,147		+34.33
Democratic hold				
