= Michigan Department of State =

American political office

Department of State

Department overview
- Formed: October 6, 1835
- Type: State department
- Jurisdiction: State of Michigan
- Headquarters: Lansing, Michigan
- Department executives: Jocelyn Benson, Secretary of State; Aghogho Edevbie, Deputy Secretary of State
- Key document: Michigan Constitution
- Website: michigan.gov/sos

The Michigan Department of State is a principal executive department of the government of Michigan. It is responsible for administering elections, regulating notaries public, and maintaining records of statutes and the Great Seal of Michigan. It also serves as the state's department of motor vehicles, administering motor vehicle registration and licensing automobile drivers.

The department is led by the secretary of state of Michigan, a constitutional executive officer elected on a partisan ballot every four years alongside gubernatorial elections. As the name implies, the officeholder was originally responsible for much of state government, but now the duties are similar to those of the other 46 secretaries of states across the United States. The secretary of state is the third-highest elected official in Michigan, and serves as acting governor in the absence of the governor and lieutenant governor. The office of the secretary of state of Michigan is currently held by Jocelyn Benson of the Democratic Party, first elected in 2018.

Under state law, the secretary of state must have at least one office in each of Michigan's 83 counties.

== Department organization ==
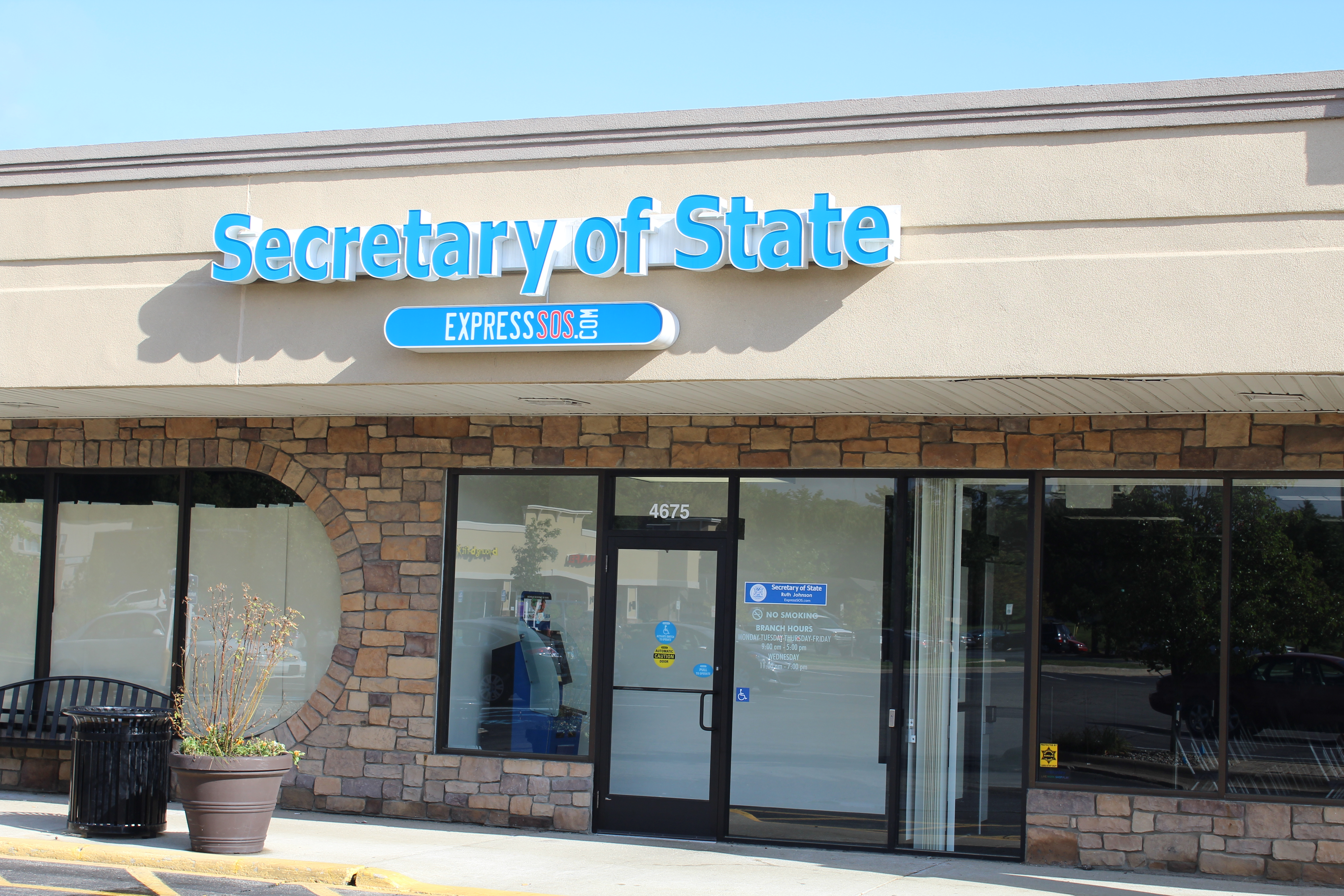
Secretary of State office, Pittsfield Township

=== Customer Services Administration ===
The Customer Services Administration (CSA) is divided into the Bureau of Branch Office Services, the Driver and Vehicle Records Division, the Office of Customer Services, the Department of State Information Center, the Program Procedures Section, and the Program Support Section. The Bureau of Branch Office Services operates a network of branch offices providing driver's licensing, vehicle titling and registration, and voter registration services to the citizens of Michigan. The Driver and Vehicle Records Division manages driver and vehicle records maintenance activities. The Office of Customer Services oversees the Renewal-By-Mail and Internet Renewal, as well as the Uniform Commercial Code. The office serves International Registration Plan vehicle owners and Michigan residents who are out of state. The Department of State Information Center is the point of contact for many citizens seeking information about Secretary of State programs and services. The center also oversees driver and vehicle record sales and the distribution of the annual jury listing to Michigan counties.

=== Department Services Administration ===
The Department Services Administration (DSA) provides coordination and support to the agency in the areas of administration, finance, technology, project management, human resources, employee development, and occupancy management. The DSA includes the Office of Technology and Project Services, the Office of Human Resources, the Office of Occupancy Services, the Accounting Services Division, the Budget Services Division, and the department's Business Application Modernization initiative.

=== Legal and Regulatory Services Administration ===
The Legal and Regulatory Services Administration (LRSA) is divided into the Bureau of Information Security, the Bureau of Regulatory Services, and the Legal Policy and Procedures Section. The LRSA provides research and counsel to the secretary of state on statutes and rules administered.

== Secretary of state ==
Secretary of State of Michigan

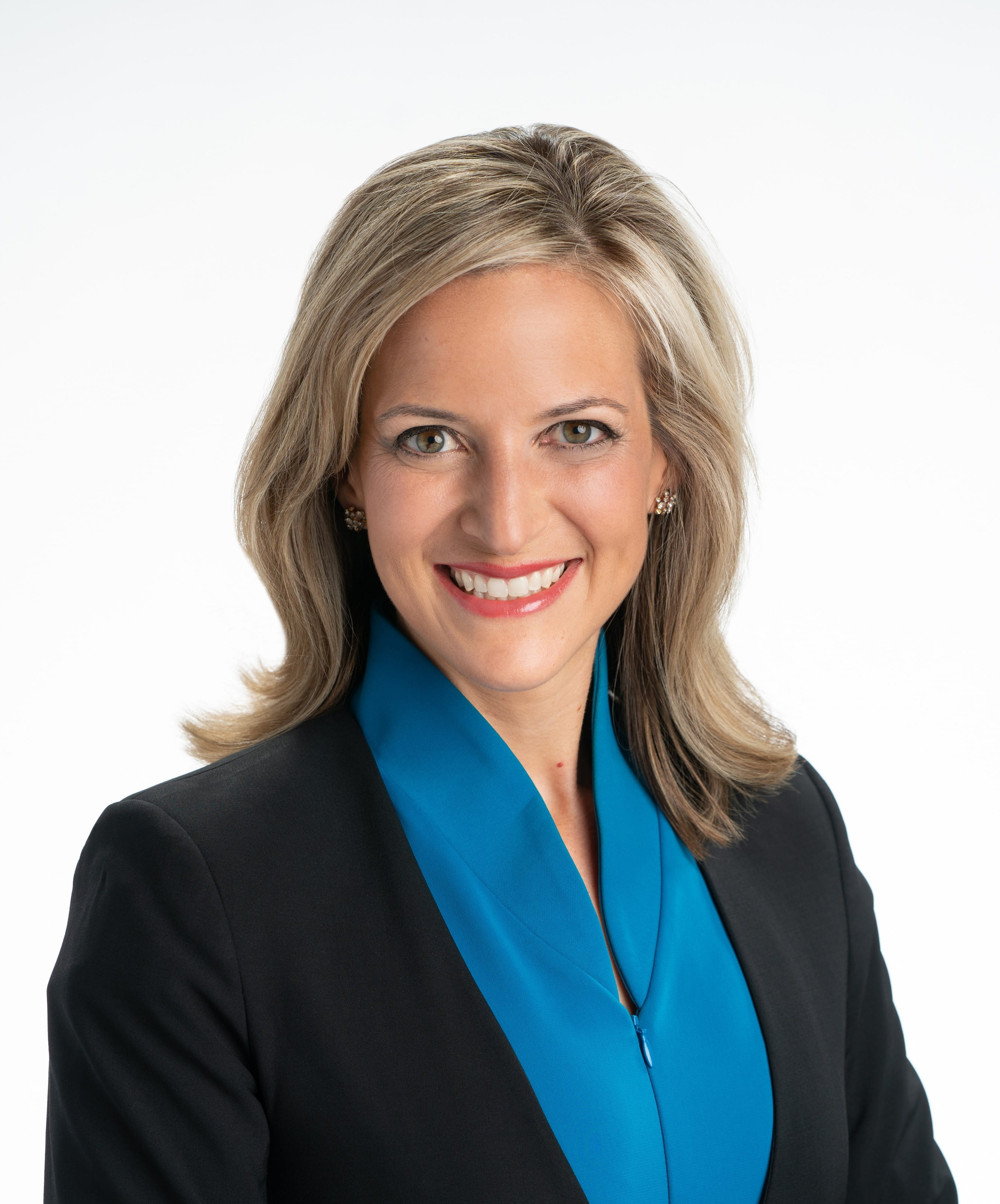
- Incumbent; Jocelyn Benson since January 1, 2019
- Michigan Department of State
- Appointer: Popular election
- Term length: 4 years, renewable once
- Inaugural holder: Kintzing Prichette
- Formation: 1837
- Website: michigan.gov/sos

The secretary of state is elected for a four-year term, concurrent with that of the governor. Candidates are nominated at partisan conventions. Under an amendment to the state Constitution which was passed in 1992, the secretary of state is restricted to two four-year terms in that office.

Under the original 1835 Michigan Constitution, the secretary of state was established as an appointed position. They were appointed by the governor with the consent of the state senate. Under the 1850 Michigan Constitution, the secretary of state became an elected position. Secretaries of state were elected to serve two year terms under this constitution. Under the current 1963 state constitution, the terms of secretaries of state were extended to four years.

The secretary of state receives the courtesy title of The Honorable for life.

=== List of officeholders ===
#	Image	Name	Term	Party / Appointer	Notes	Ref.
1		Kintzing Prichette	1835–1838	Stevens T. Mason		
2		Randolph Manning	1838–1840	Stevens T. Mason		
3		Thomas Rowland	1840–1842	William Woodbridge		
4		Robert P. Eldredge	1842–1846	John S. Barry		
5		Gideon O. Whittemore	1846–1848	Alpheus Felch		
6		George W. Peck	1848–1850	Epaphroditus Ransom		
7		George R. Redfield	1850	John S. Barry	Resigned	
8		Charles H. Taylor	1850–1852	John S. Barry (Note: Appointed by governor to fill vacancy in 1850. Later in 1850, Taylor becomes the first Michigan secretary of state to be elected.)		
8		Charles H. Taylor	1850–1852	Democratic		
9		William Graves	1853–1854	Democratic		
10		John McKinney	1855–1858	Republican		
11		Nelson G. Isbell	1859–1860	Republican		
12		James B. Porter	1861–1866	Republican		
13		Oliver L. Spaulding	1867–1870	Republican		
14		Daniel Striker	1871–1874	Republican		
15		Ebenezer G. D. Holden	1875–1878	Republican		
16		William Jenney	1879–1882	Republican		
17		Harry A. Conant	1883–1886	Republican		
18		Gilbert R. Osmun	1887–1890	Republican		
19		Daniel E. Soper	1891	Democratic	Resigned	
20		Robert R. Blacker	1891–1892	Edwin B. Winans (Note: Appointed by governor to fill vacancy.)		
21		John W. Jochim	1893–1894	Republican	Removed (Note: Removed from office by the governor.)	
22		Washington Gardner	1894–1898	John T. Rich (Note: Initially appointed by governor to fill vacancy, and thereafter elected.)		
22		Washington Gardner	1894–1898	Republican		
23		Justus S. Stearns	1899–1900	Republican		
24		Fred M. Warner	1901–1904	Republican		
25		George A. Prescott	1905–1908	Republican		
26		Frederick C. Martindale	1909–1914	Republican		
27		Coleman C. Vaughan	1915–1920	Republican		
28		Charles J. DeLand	1921–1926	Republican		
29		John S. Haggerty	1927–1930	Republican		
30		Frank Fitzgerald	1931–1934	Republican	Resigned	
31		Clarke W. Brown	1934	William Comstock		
32		Orville E. Atwood	1935–1936	Republican		
33		Leon D. Case	1937–1938	Democratic		
34		Harry Kelly	1939–1942	Republican		
35		Herman H. Dignan	1943–1946	Republican		
36		Frederick M. Alger Jr.	1947–1952	Republican		
37		Owen Cleary	1953–1954	Republican		
38		James M. Hare	1955–1970	Democratic		
39		Richard H. Austin	1971–1994	Democratic		
40		Candice Miller	1995–2002	Republican		
41		Terri Lynn Land	2003–2010	Republican		
42		Ruth Johnson	2011–2018	Republican		
43		Jocelyn Benson	2019–present	Democratic		
