= 2014 United States elections =

- ← 2012 2013 2014 2015 2016 → Midterm elections
- Election day: November 4
- Incumbent president: ▌Barack Obama (D)
- Next Congress: 114th

Senate elections
- Overall control: Republican gain
- Seats contested: 36 of 100 seats (33 seats of Class II + 3 special elections)
- Net seat change: Republican +9
- Map of the 2014 Senate races Democratic hold Republican hold Republican gain A box in a state indicates that both Senate seats were up for election.

House elections
- Overall control: Republican hold
- Seats contested: All 435 seats to the 114th Congress
- Popular vote margin: Republican +5.7%
- Net seat change: Republican +13
- Map of the 2014 House races Democratic hold Democratic gain Republican hold Republican gain

Gubernatorial elections
- Seats contested: 39 (36 states, 3 territories)
- Net seat change: Republican +3
- Map of the 2014 gubernatorial races Democratic hold Republican hold Democratic gain Republican gain Independent gain

Elections were held in the United States on November 4, 2014, in the middle of Democratic President Barack Obama's second term. A typical six-year itch midterm election suffered by most second-term presidents, this election saw the Republican Party expanding their majority in the House of Representatives and winning control of the Senate, while furthering their gains in the governorships and state legislatures. Because of these Republican gains, the election was commonly cited as a "red wave" election.

Republicans won a net gain of nine Senate seats, the largest Senate gain for either party since the 1980 United States elections. In the House, Republicans won a net gain of thirteen seats, giving them their largest majority since the 1928 elections. In state elections, Republicans won a net gain of two gubernatorial seats and flipped control of ten legislative chambers. Various other state, territorial, and local elections and referendums were held throughout the year.

With total spending reaching $3.7 billion, the midterm election, at the time, was the most expensive in history, being surpassed by the 2018 midterm election four years later. The 2014 election also saw the lowest turnout since 1942, with just 36.4% of eligible voters voting. Coupled with the 2010 midterms earlier in the Obama administration, this election marked the first time since the Reagan Administration that a two-term president's party suffered net losses in both houses of Congress in both midterm elections.

== Issues ==
Major issues of the election included income inequality, and the Affordable Care Act (commonly referred to as "Obamacare"), which Republicans sought to repeal. Democrats promoted their proposal to increase the minimum wage. In the lead-up to the 2014 election, Republicans harshly criticized the Obama administration for four ebola cases in the United States that were diagnosed weeks prior to the election. The American media intensely covered the ebola scare. However, immediately after the election, Republicans dropped Ebola as an issue. Studies found that Republican rhetoric and media coverage of the Ebola scare helped Republican candidates in the 2014 election.

Although it generated much debate in early 2014, the Keystone Pipeline ultimately received little attention in the election, with environmentalists instead focused on fighting global warming and supporting the EPA's proposed regulations on greenhouse gas emissions. Another potentially important issue, net neutrality, received little attention during the campaign.

National exit polling showed that 45% of voters said the economy was their most important issue. This was a decline from 2010 and 2008 (when 59% of voters and 63% of voters, respectively, named it as their top issue), but was still the most common issue cited by voters as most important to them. Smaller numbers of voters named health care, foreign policy, or illegal immigration as their top issues, or same-sex marriage, Ebola, or the legalization of marijuana as their top issues.

== Federal elections ==
With a final total of 247 seats (56.78%) in the House and 54 seats in the Senate, the Republicans ultimately achieved their largest majority in the U.S. Congress since the 71st Congress in 1929.

=== Congressional elections ===
==== Senate elections ====
All 33 seats in Senate Class II were up for election. Additionally, three special elections were held to fill vacancies in Class III.

Of the 36 Senate races, the Republican Party won 24 (a net gain of nine seats, which represents the largest gain for a party in the Senate since 1980, and the largest Senate gain in a midterm since 1958) and the Democratic Party won 12, thus resulting in the Republicans regaining control of the Senate for the first time since 2006, with a total of 54 seats. The race in Louisiana headed to a run-off on December 6, 2014, in which Rep. Bill Cassidy (R) defeated 3-term incumbent Sen. Mary Landrieu 55.9% to 44.1%.

==== House of Representatives elections ====
All 435 voting seats in the United States House of Representatives were up for election. Elections were held to select the delegates for the District of Columbia and four of the five U.S. territories. The only seat in the House not up for election was the Resident Commissioner of Puerto Rico, who serves a four-year term. The Republican party won 247 seats (a net gain of 13 seats) and the Democratic Party, 188 seats. Thus, the Republicans gained their largest majority in the House since 1928. Nationwide, Republicans won the popular vote for the House of Representatives by a margin of 5.7 percent.

On March 11, there was a special election for Florida's 13th congressional district, won by the Republican Party.

== State elections ==
=== Gubernatorial elections ===
Elections were held for the governorships of 36 U.S. states and three U.S. territories. The Republican Party won 24 of the 36 state governorships for a net gain of two seats, as they picked up open Democratic-held seats in Arkansas, Maryland and Massachusetts and defeated incumbent governor Pat Quinn in Illinois, while Republican incumbents Tom Corbett of Pennsylvania and Sean Parnell of Alaska respectively lost to Democrat Tom Wolf and independent Bill Walker. This cycle marked the first time an incumbent governor running for re-election in Pennsylvania lost in the modern era. The final total, as a result, was 31 Republican governors, 18 Democratic governors, and one independent governor. In the table below, the US state governorships held by Democrats included: California, Colorado, Connecticut, Delaware, Hawaii, Kentucky, Minnesota, Missouri, Montana, New York, Oregon, Rhode Island, Virginia, Vermont, Washington, and West Virginia in addition to Washington, DC and Virgin Islands.

=== State legislative elections ===
Elections to state legislatures were held in 46 U.S. states in 2014 with a total of 6,049 seats up for election (82 percent of the total number of state legislative seats in the United States). Six territorial chambers were up in four territories and the District of Columbia.

Prior to the general election, Republicans regained control of the Virginia Senate after winning a decisive August special election. They had lost control at the start of the year due to the election of Democratic lieutenant governor Ralph Northam.

In the general election, Republicans initially gained control of nine legislative chambers: both chambers of the Nevada Legislature (which gave them a trifecta for the first time since 1931), the Minnesota House of Representatives, the New Hampshire House of Representatives, the New Mexico House of Representatives for the first time since 1955, the West Virginia House of Delegates, the Colorado Senate, the Maine Senate, and the New York Senate, which was previously under a Republican-led coalition. This increased the total number of Republican-controlled state houses from 58 to 67. The day after the election, Republicans, who achieved a 17–17 tie in the West Virginia Senate, gained control of that chamber as well thanks to the defection of State Senator Daniel Hall, thus increasing their total gains to ten, for a final total of 68 state houses won. This allowed Republicans to win control of either chamber of the West Virginia legislature for the first time since 1933.

The election left the Republicans in control of the highest amount of state legislatures in the party's history since 1928, and it also left the Democratic Party in control of the smallest number of state legislatures since 1860. This election marks the last time Democrats won control of a state legislative chamber in a deeply Republican state.

=== Ballot measures ===
Many states had voters reject or approve ballot measures.

== Local elections ==
Numerous elections were held for officeholders in numerous cities, counties, school boards, special districts, and others around the country.

=== Mayoral elections ===
Major cities which held mayoral elections in 2014 include:

- Louisville, Kentucky: Incumbent Greg Fischer was re-elected to a second term.
- New Orleans, Louisiana: Incumbent Mitch Landrieu was re-elected to a second term on February 1.
- Newark, New Jersey: Acting mayor Luis A. Quintana, who took over on November 4, 2013, after Cory Booker resigned to become U.S. Senator, declined to run for a full term. Ras J. Baraka was elected as Newark's new mayor on May 13.
- Reno, Nevada: Incumbent Bob Cashell is term-limited out of office.
- San Diego, California: A special election was held on February 11 following the resignation of Bob Filner on August 30, 2013. Kevin Faulconer defeated David Alvarez to serve out the balance of Filner's term.
- San Jose, California: Incumbent Chuck Reed is term-limited out of office. A primary election was held on June 3, and a run-off was held on November 4. Sam Liccardo edged out opponent Dave Cortese in a razor-thin victory with 50.8% of the vote.
- Shreveport, Louisiana: Incumbent Cedric Glover is term-limited out of office.
- Washington, D.C.: Incumbent Vincent C. Gray was defeated in the Democratic primary on April 1 by Muriel Bowser. The general election was held on November 4 and Bowser was elected as mayor.

== Turnout ==
Nationwide voter turnout was 36.4%, down from 40.9% in the 2010 midterms and the lowest since the 1942 elections, when just 33.9% of voters turned out, though that election came during the middle of World War II.

The states with the highest turnout were Maine (59.3%), Wisconsin (56.9%), Alaska (55.3%), Colorado (53%), Oregon (52.7%) Minnesota (51.3%), Iowa (50.6%), New Hampshire (48.8%), Montana (46.1%) and South Dakota (44.6%), all of which except for Iowa and Montana featured a competitive gubernatorial race and all of which except for Maine and Wisconsin also featured competitive Senate races. The states with the highest turnout that had no Senate or gubernatorial race that year were North Dakota (44.1%) and Washington state (38.6%).

The states with the lowest turnout were Indiana (28%), Texas (28.5%), Utah (28.8%), Tennessee (29.1%), New York (29.5%), Mississippi (29.7%), Oklahoma (29.8%), New Jersey (30.4%) and West Virginia and Nevada (31.8%). Indiana and Utah had no Senate or gubernatorial elections and the others all had races for at least one of the posts, but they were not considered competitive. Turnout in Washington, D.C. was (30.3%).

According to CNN, Americans aged between 18 and 29 accounted for 13% of voters, down from 19% in the presidential election two years before.

Analysis by the Pew Research Center found that 35% of non-voters cited work or school commitments, which prevented them from voting, 34% said they were too busy, unwell, away from home or forgot to vote, 20% either didn't like the choices, didn't know enough or didn't care and 10% had recently moved, missed a registration deadline or didn't have transportation.

The New York Times counts apathy, anger and frustration at the relentlessly negative tone of the campaigns as the reasons of low turnout and stated, "Neither party gave voters an affirmative reason to show up at the polls."

== Controversies and other issues ==
=== Allegations of misconduct ===
Connecticut State Representative Christina Ayala (Democrat) was arrested in September 2014 on 19 voting fraud charges, specifically "eight counts of fraudulent voting, 10 counts of primary or enrollment violations and one count of tampering with or fabricating physical evidence." In September 2015 she pleaded guilty to state election law violations, received a one-year sentence (suspended) along with two years 'conditional discharge', and agreed not to seek elective office for two years. Her mother, Democratic Registrar of Voters Santa Ayala, was also the subject of an investigation in the case, but was not charged.

California State Senator Roderick Wright (Democrat) resigned from office in September 2014 and was sentenced to 90 days in Los Angeles county jail for perjury and voter fraud. Despite being convicted months earlier for 8 felonies, Wright was allowed to take a paid leave of absence as state senator.

In Chicago, election judges said they had received automated phone calls between October–November 3 with apparently false instructions about voting or required training, according to the Chicago Sun-Times. In Pontiac, Michigan, local Democrats cited reports of voter harassment and intimidation by Republicans over questioning legally-cast ballots with election workers repeatedly having had to ask them to step aside. A clerk called police for help.

=== New voting restrictions ===
In June 2013, the Supreme Court invalidated part of the Voting Rights Act of 1965, permitting nine (mostly Southern) states to change their election laws without advance federal approval. Since 2010, 22 states enacted new voting restrictions. The 2014 federal election was the first federal election where 15 states enacted new voting restrictions, many of which faced challenges in court.

=== Voting machine issues ===
Scattered issues with voting machines occurred, with miscalibrated machines recorded a vote cast for one candidate as a vote for another candidate. They occurred in Virginia, Maryland, Illinois, and North Carolina.

In Bexar County, Texas, the Republican candidate for governor, Greg Abbott, was accidentally replaced on the ballot by David Dewhurst on one machine, on which 12 votes were cast before the problem was caught.

== Milestones ==
A series of milestones were set for women, African-Americans, and Hispanics, among others, in the U.S. Congress and American politics in general. These include:

- Republican Saira Blair, elected to the West Virginia House of Delegates, became the youngest elected official to state office in American history, at age 18.
- Republican Terry Branstad, the governor of Iowa, was re-elected to a sixth four-year term as governor, thus becoming the longest-serving governor in U.S. history (surpassing George Clinton of New York).
- Republican Shelley Moore Capito, elected to the Senate from West Virginia, became the first female senator in West Virginia's history.
- Republican Joni Ernst, elected to the Senate from Iowa, became the first female combat veteran elected to the U.S. Senate, the first woman ever elected on a statewide level in Iowa, and the first woman ever elected to the U.S. Congress from Iowa.
- Democrat Nellie Gorbea, elected Secretary of State of Rhode Island, became the first Hispanic to be elected to a statewide office in New England.
- Democrat Maura Healey, elected Massachusetts Attorney General, became the first openly gay state attorney general elected in America.
- Republican Will Hurd, elected to the House from Texas, was the first African-American Republican elected to Congress in Texas.
- Republican Mia Love, elected to the House from Utah, was the first African-American woman elected to Congress as a Republican, the first Haitian-American person elected to the U.S. Congress, and the first African-American elected to Congress from the state of Utah.
- Republican Martha McSally, the first American woman to fly in combat since the 1991 lifting of the prohibition of women in combat, as well as the first woman to command a USAF fighter squadron, was elected to the House from Arizona.
- Republican Alex Mooney, elected to the House from West Virginia, became the first Latino elected to Congress in West Virginia's history.
- Democrat Gina Raimondo, elected Governor of Rhode Island was the first woman elected governor in Rhode Island and first to restrict transportation related to a neighboring Democratic state (New York State).
- Republican Tim Scott, elected to the Senate from South Carolina, was the first African-American in history to be popularly elected to the U.S. Senate in a former Confederate state, and also became the first African-American to be elected to both the House and the Senate.
- Republican Elise Stefanik, elected to the House from New York, was the youngest woman elected to Congress at age 30. She beat the previous record-holder and fellow New Yorker, Elizabeth Holtzman, who was elected at age 31 in 1972.

== Table of federal and state results ==
Bold indicates a change in partisan control. Note that not all states held gubernatorial, state legislative, and United States Senate elections in 2014.

State		Before 2014 elections				After 2014 elections			
State	PVI	Governor	State leg.	US Senate	US House	Governor	State leg.	US Senate	US House
Alabama	R+14	Rep	Rep	Rep	Rep 6–1	Rep	Rep	Rep	Rep 6–1
Alaska	R+12	Rep	Rep	Split	Rep 1–0	**Ind**	Rep	**Rep**	Rep 1–0
Arizona	R+7	Rep	Rep	Rep	Dem 5–4	Rep	Rep	Rep	**Rep 5–4**
Arkansas	R+14	Dem	Rep	Split	Rep 4–0	**Rep**	Rep	**Rep**	Rep 4–0
California	D+9	Dem	Dem	Dem	Dem 38–15	Dem	Dem	Dem	Dem 39–14
Colorado	D+1	Dem	Dem	Dem	Rep 4–3	Dem	**Split**	**Split**	Rep 4–3
Connecticut	D+7	Dem	Dem	Dem	Dem 5–0	Dem	Dem	Dem	Dem 5–0
Delaware	D+7	Dem	Dem	Dem	Dem 1–0	Dem	Dem	Dem	Dem 1–0
Florida	R+2	Rep	Rep	Split	Rep 17–10	Rep	Rep	Split	Rep 17–10
Georgia	R+5	Rep	Rep	Rep	Rep 9–5	Rep	Rep	Rep	Rep 10–4
Hawaii	D+20	Dem	Dem	Dem	Dem 2–0	Dem	Dem	Dem	Dem 2–0
Idaho	R+18	Rep	Rep	Rep	Rep 2–0	Rep	Rep	Rep	Rep 2–0
Illinois	D+8	Dem	Dem	Split	Dem 12–6	**Rep**	Dem	Split	Dem 10–8
Indiana	R+5	Rep	Rep	Split	Rep 7–2	Rep	Rep	Split	Rep 7–2
Iowa	D+1	Rep	Split	Split	Split 2–2	Rep	Split	**Rep**	**Rep 3–1**
Kansas	R+12	Rep	Rep	Rep	Rep 4–0	Rep	Rep	Rep	Rep 4–0
Kentucky	R+13	Dem	Split	Rep	Rep 5–1	Dem	Split	Rep	Rep 5–1
Louisiana	R+12	Rep	Rep	Split	Rep 5–1	Rep	Rep	**Rep**	Rep 5–1
Maine	D+5	Rep	Dem	Split R/I	Dem 2–0	Rep	**Split**	Split R/I	**Split 1–1**
Maryland	D+10	Dem	Dem	Dem	Dem 7–1	**Rep**	Dem	Dem	Dem 7–1
Massachusetts	D+10	Dem	Dem	Dem	Dem 9–0	**Rep**	Dem	Dem	Dem 9–0
Michigan	D+4	Rep	Rep	Dem	Rep 9–5	Rep	Rep	Dem	Rep 9–5
Minnesota	D+2	Dem	Dem	Dem	Dem 5–3	Dem	**Split**	Dem	Dem 5–3
Mississippi	R+9	Rep	Rep	Rep	Rep 3–1	Rep	Rep	Rep	Rep 3–1
Missouri	R+5	Dem	Rep	Split	Rep 6–2	Dem	Rep	Split	Rep 6–2
Montana	R+7	Dem	Rep	Dem	Rep 1–0	Dem	Rep	**Split**	Rep 1–0
Nebraska	R+12	Rep	NP	Rep	Rep 3–0	Rep	NP	Rep	Rep 2–1
Nevada	D+2	Rep	Dem	Split	Split 2–2	Rep	**Rep**	Split	**Rep 3–1**
New Hampshire	D+1	Dem	Split	Split	Dem 2–0	Dem	**Rep**	Split	**Split 1–1**
New Jersey	D+6	Rep	Dem	Dem	Split 6–6	Rep	Dem	Dem	Split 6–6
New Mexico	D+4	Rep	Dem	Dem	Dem 2–1	Rep	**Split**	Dem	Dem 2–1
New York	D+11	Dem	Split	Dem	Dem 21–6	Dem	Split	Dem	Dem 18–9
North Carolina	R+3	Rep	Rep	Split	Rep 9–4	Rep	Rep	**Rep**	Rep 10–3
North Dakota	R+10	Rep	Rep	Split	Rep 1–0	Rep	Rep	Split	Rep 1–0
Ohio	R+1	Rep	Rep	Split	Rep 12–4	Rep	Rep	Split	Rep 12–4
Oklahoma	R+19	Rep	Rep	Rep	Rep 5–0	Rep	Rep	Rep	Rep 5–0
Oregon	D+5	Dem	Dem	Dem	Dem 4–1	Dem	Dem	Dem	Dem 4–1
Pennsylvania	D+1	Rep	Rep	Split	Rep 13–5	**Dem**	Rep	Split	Rep 13–5
Rhode Island	D+11	Dem	Dem	Dem	Dem 2–0	Dem	Dem	Dem	Dem 2–0
South Carolina	R+8	Rep	Rep	Rep	Rep 6–1	Rep	Rep	Rep	Rep 6–1
South Dakota	R+10	Rep	Rep	Split	Rep 1–0	Rep	Rep	**Rep**	Rep 1–0
Tennessee	R+12	Rep	Rep	Rep	Rep 7–2	Rep	Rep	Rep	Rep 7–2
Texas	R+10	Rep	Rep	Rep	Rep 24–12	Rep	Rep	Rep	Rep 25–11
Utah	R+22	Rep	Rep	Rep	Rep 3–1	Rep	Rep	Rep	Rep 4–0
Vermont	D+16	Dem	Dem	Split D/I	Dem 1–0	Dem	Dem	Split D/I	Dem 1–0
Virginia	Even	Dem	Rep	Dem	Rep 8–3	Dem	Rep	Dem	Rep 8–3
Washington	D+5	Dem	Split	Dem	Dem 6–4	Dem	Split	Dem	Dem 6–4
West Virginia	R+13	Dem	Dem	Dem	Rep 2–1	Dem	**Rep**	**Split**	Rep 3–0
Wisconsin	D+2	Rep	Rep	Split	Rep 5–3	Rep	Rep	Split	Rep 5–3
Wyoming	R+22	Rep	Rep	Rep	Rep 1–0	Rep	Rep	Rep	Rep 1–0
United States	Even	Rep 29–21	Rep 27–19	Dem 55–45	Rep 233–199	Rep 31–18	Rep 30–11	**Rep 54–46**	Rep 247–188
Washington, D.C.	D+43	Dem (Note: Washington, D.C. does not elect a governor or state legislature, but it does elect a mayor and a city council.)	Dem	—N/a	Dem	Dem	Dem	—N/a	Dem
American Samoa	—N/a	NP/I (Note: Although elections for governor of American Samoa are non-partisan, Governor Lolo Matalasi Moliga was elected as an Independent in 2012.)	NP	—N/a	Rep	NP/I	NP	—N/a	Rep
Guam	—N/a	Rep	Dem	—N/a	Dem	Rep	Dem	—N/a	Dem
N. Mariana Islands	—N/a	Rep (Note: Northern Marianas Islands Governor Eloy Inos was elected as a member of the Covenant Party, but became a Republican in 2013 after being elevated from lieutenant governor to governor.)	Split	—N/a	Ind (Note: Northern Marianas Islands Delegate Gregorio Sablan was elected as an independent and has caucused with the Democrats since taking office in 2009.)	Rep	Split	—N/a	Ind
Puerto Rico	—N/a	PDP/D (Note: Puerto Rican Governor Alejandro García Padilla is a member of the Popular Democratic Party but affiliates with the Democratic Party at the national level.)	PDP	—N/a	PNP/D (Note: Puerto Rico's Resident Commissioner, Pedro Pierluisi, was elected as a member of the New Progressive Party and has caucused with the Democrats since taking office in 2009.)	PDP/D	PDP	—N/a	PNP/D
U.S. Virgin Islands	—N/a	Dem	Dem	—N/a	Dem	**Ind**	Dem	—N/a	Dem
Subdivision	PVI	Governor	State leg.	U.S. Senate	U.S. House	Governor	State leg.	U.S. Senate	U.S. House
Subdivision and PVI		Before 2014 elections				After 2014 elections			

== Viewership ==
Legend

cable news network
broadcast network

Total television viewers
10:00 PM Eastern

Network	Viewers
FNC	6,607,000
CBS	5,408,000
NBC	4,225,000
ABC	3,147,000
CNN	1,936,000
MSNBC	1,594,000

Television viewers 25 to 54
10:00 PM Eastern

Network	Viewers
FNC	1,825,000
CBS	1,548,000
NBC	1,484,000
ABC	1,083,000
CNN	912,000
MSNBC	566,000

Total cable TV viewers
8:00 to 11:00 PM Eastern

Network	Viewers
FNC	6,310,000
CNN	2,107,000
MSNBC	1,687,000

Cable TV viewers 25 to 54
8:00 to 11:00 PM Eastern

Network	Viewers
FNC	1,662,000
CNN	909,000
MSNBC	525,000

Source: adweek
