= 2026 Reno mayoral election =

Election in Nevada, United States

- November 3, 2026
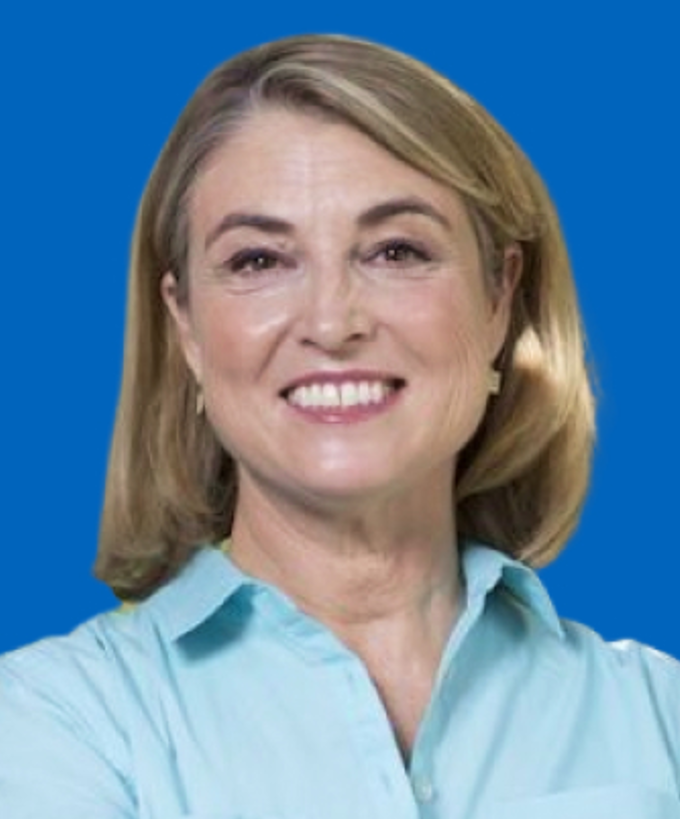

Candidate	Kate Marshall	Kathleen Taylor
Popular vote	56,925	36,278
Percentage	61.08%	38.92%
Mayor before election
Hillary Schieve
Elected mayor
Kate Marshall

The 2026 Reno mayoral election was held on November 3, 2026, to elect the mayor of Reno, Nevada. A nonpartisan top-two primary was held on June 9, 2026. Incumbent mayor Hillary Schieve was ineligible to run for a fourth term. The election was won by former lieutenant governor of Nevada Kate Marshall.

== Candidates ==
=== Declared ===
- Eddie Lorton, runner-up for mayor in 2022 and 2018 (Note: (Party affiliation: Republican))
- Kate Marshall, former lieutenant governor of Nevada (2019–2021) (Note: (Party affiliation: Democratic))
- Greg "Nutt" Nuttle, bartender
- Devon Reese, city councilmember from the 5th ward (2020–present)
- Tim Ross, retired police sergeant
- Kathleen Taylor, vice-mayor of Reno from the 1st ward (2024–present)
- Corinthia M. Yancey
- John Wayne Zink

== Primary election ==
=== Endorsements ===
Kate Marshall

Executive branch officials

- Jason Frierson, former United States attorney for the District of Nevada (2022–2025)

U.S. representatives

- Shelley Berkley, mayor of Las Vegas (2024–present) and former NV-01 (1999–2013)
- Susie Lee, NV-03 (2019–present)
- Dina Titus, NV-01 (2013–present)

State legislators

- Skip Daly, state senator from the 13th district (2022–present)
- Heather Goulding, state assemblymember from the 27th district (2024–present)

Labor unions

- International Union of Operating Engineers Local 3
- Laborers' International Union Local 169

Organizations

- Democratic Mayors Association
- EMILYs List
- Latino Victory
Devon Reese

Labor unions

- Professional Firefighters of Nevada

=== Results ===
2026 Reno mayoral primary election
Candidate	Votes	%
Kate Marshall	22,562	44.85
Kathleen Taylor	9,548	18.98
Eddie Lorton	9,161	18.21
Devon Reese	4,688	9.32
Tim Ross	2,229	4.43
Greg Nuttle	872	1.73
Corinthia Yancey	642	1.28
John Zink	306	0.61
Jesse Razo	303	0.60
Total votes	50,311	100.0

== General election ==
=== Results ===
2026 Reno mayoral election
Candidate	Votes	%
Kate Marshall	56,925	61.08
Kathleen Taylor	36,278	38.92
Total votes	93,203	100.0
