= 2014 Reno mayoral election =

The 2014 Reno mayoral election was held on November 4, 2014, to elect the mayor of Reno, Nevada. The mayor of Reno is a non-partisan position. The incumbent mayor, Bob Cashell, was not eligible to run due to term limits. Hillary Schieve was elected mayor. In February 2014, Eddie Lorton, who was a candidate himself, led a campaign which eliminated two candidates, Dwight Dortch and Jessica Sferraza, from the race. The Nevada Supreme Court responded to Lorton's suit by ruling that people who already served for 12 years on the city council could not run for mayor. Although Cashell had previously said he would not endorse any candidate, in late May he endorsed Raymond "Pez" Pezonella.

== Results ==
=== Primary ===
The primary was held on June 10, 2014.

Primary results
Candidate	Vote %	Votes
Hillary Schieve	26.2	6629
Raymond "Pez" Pezonella	18	4550
DeLores Aiazzi	2.6	666
Robert Avery	7	1781
Marsha Berkbigler	5.1	1288
Michael Bertrand	0.5	132
Sean Burke	0.9	222
Chad Dehne	0.8	208
Thomas Fitzgerald	1.2	296
Brian Lee Fleming	0.2	50
Erik Holland	2.8	714
Eddie Lorton	8.7	2194
Mark Markel	0.3	68
Ian Pasalich	1.2	310
Tony Perri	0.3	75
Larry Pizorno	0.5	134
Charles "Chuck" Reno	8.4	2127
Idora Silver	10.7	2697
Ken Stark	4.5	1148
Total		14,914

=== General election ===
The general election was held on November 4, 2014.

General election results
Candidate	Vote %	Votes
Hillary Schieve	60.9	32,445
Raymond "Pez" Pezonella	39.1	20,803
Total		53,248

== See also ==
- List of mayors of Reno, Nevada
