= 2022 Reno mayoral election =

- November 8, 2022
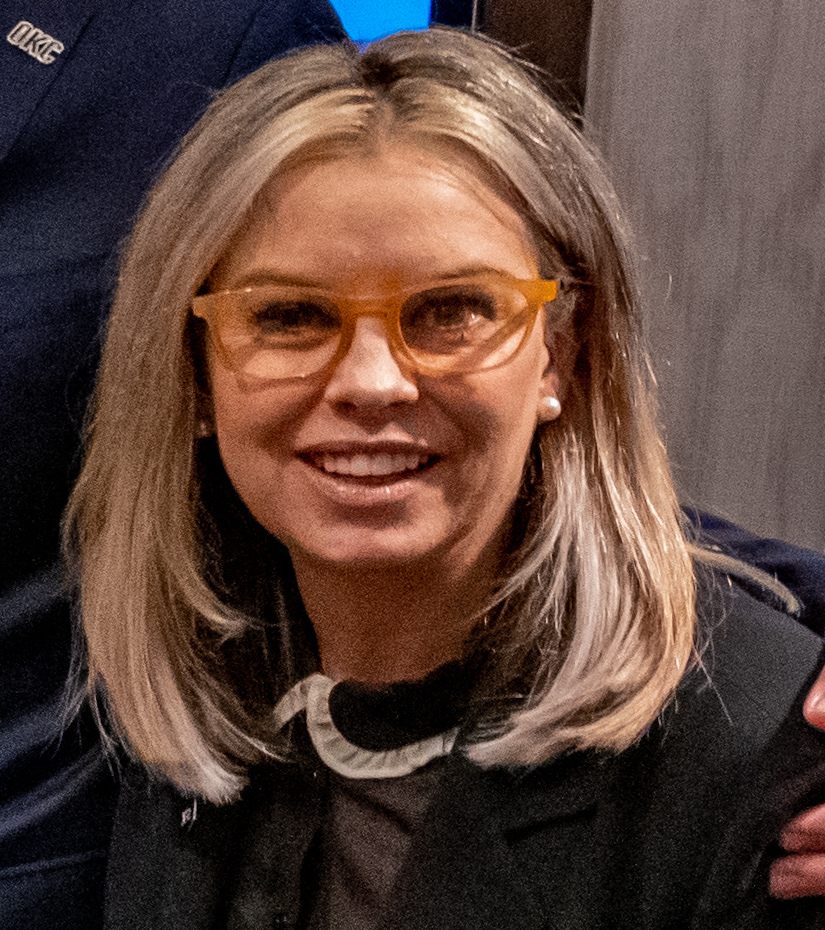

Candidate	Hillary Schieve	Eddie Lorton
Popular vote	52,512	36,392
Percentage	59.07%	40.93%
Mayor before election
Hillary Schieve
Elected mayor
Hillary Schieve

The 2022 Reno mayoral election was held on November 8, 2022, to elect the mayor of Reno, Nevada. Incumbent Hillary Schieve won re-election to a third and final term.

Municipal elections in Nevada are nonpartisan. A blanket primary election was held on June 14, concurrently with the statewide primary elections.

== Candidates ==
=== Advanced to general ===
- Eddie Lorton, candidate for mayor in 2014 and 2018
- Hillary Schieve, incumbent mayor

=== Eliminated in primary ===
- Jenny Brekhus, city councilor
- Chad Dehne, U.S. Marine Corps veteran, perennial candidate and candidate for mayor in 2010, 2014, and 2018
- Michael Graham
- Matthew Johnson
- William Mantle, family support specialist, candidate for mayor in 2018
- Jesse O. Razo
- Joaquin R. Roces
- Judi Rought

== Primary election ==
=== Polling ===
Poll source	Date(s) administered	Sample size (Note: Key: A – all adults RV – registered voters LV – likely voters V – unclear)	Margin of error	Hillary Schieve	Jenny Brekhus	Undecided
This is Reno	October 2021	N/A	± N/A	29%	28%	43%

=== Results ===
2022 Reno mayoral primary
Candidate	Votes	%
Hillary Schieve (incumbent)	18,455	39.60
Eddie Lorton	11,116	23.85
Jenny Brekhus	9,563	20.52
William Mantle	1,535	3.29
Chad Dehne	1,194	2.56
Tabitha Schneider	1,047	2.25
Matt Johnson	1,035	2.22
Judi Rought	901	1.93
Joaquin R. Roces	627	1.35
Michael Graham	594	1.27
Jesse O. Razo	542	1.16
Total votes	46,609	100.00

== General election ==
=== Results ===
2022 Reno mayoral election
Candidate	Votes	%
Hillary Schieve (Incumbent)	52,512	59.07
Eddie Lorton	36,392	40.93
Total votes	88,904	100.00

== See also ==
- List of mayors of Reno, Nevada
