= 2014 Shreveport mayoral election =

- November 4, 2014 (first round); December 6, 2014 (runoff)

Candidate	Ollie Tyler	Victoria Provenza	Patrick C. Williams
Party	Democratic	Independent	Democratic
First round	26,063; 43.7%	15,218; 25.52%	12,901; 12.63%
Runoff	34,261; 63.3%	19,860; 36.7%	Eliminated
Mayor before election
Cedric Glover
Democratic
Elected mayor
Ollie Tyler
Democratic

The 2014 Shreveport mayoral election resulted in the election of the Democrat Ollie Tyler as the first African-American female mayor of Shreveport. She defeated Victoria Provenza in the runoff election to succeed the term-limited incumbent Cedric Glover. The nonpartisan blanket primary was held on November 4, 2014, and as no candidate obtained the required majority, the general election followed on December 6, 2014.

No Republican sought the position.

== Results ==
2014 Mayor of Shreveport primary election
Party	Candidate	Votes	%
Democratic	Ollie Tyler	26,063	43.70%
Independent	Victoria Provenza	15,218	25.52%
Democratic	Patrick C. Williams	12,901	12.63%
Democratic	Sam Jenkins	2,570	4.31%
Independent	Anna Marie Arpino	1,431	2.40%
Independent	Jim Crowley	1,126	1.89%
Independent	Melvin Slack	332	0.56%
Total votes		59,641	100%

2014 Mayor of Shreveport general election
Party	Candidate	Votes	%
Democratic	Ollie Tyler	34,261	63.30%
Independent	Victoria Provenza	19,860	36.70%
Total votes		54,121	100%
