= Kate Marshall =

American lawyer and politician (born 1959)

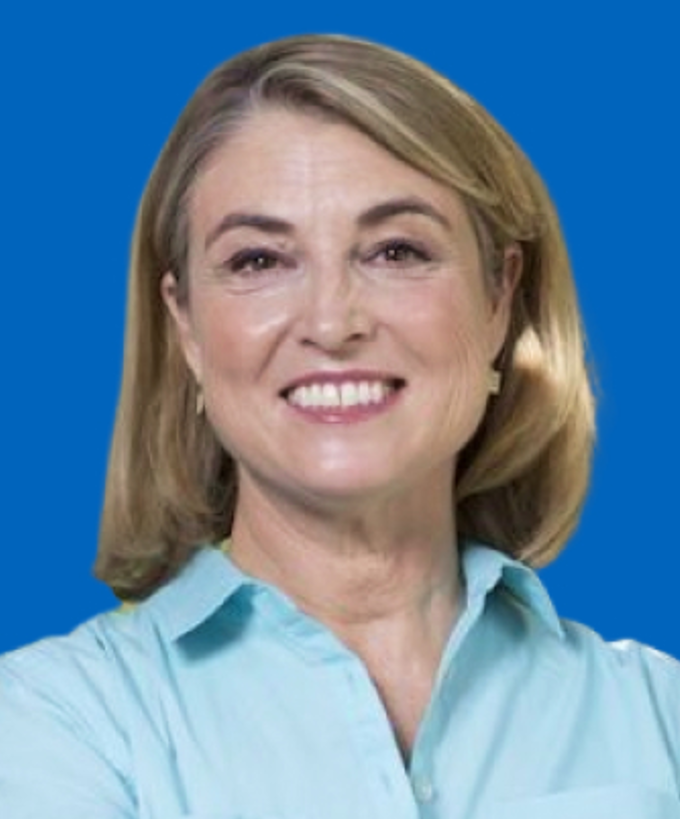

Mayor of Reno
- Incumbent
- Assumed office November 13, 2026
- Preceded by: Hillary Schieve

White House Senior Advisor to Governors
- In office August 20, 2021 – February 1, 2023
- President: Joe Biden
- Preceded by: Position established
- Succeeded by: Yvanna Cancela

35th Lieutenant Governor of Nevada
- In office January 7, 2019 – September 17, 2021
- Governor: Steve Sisolak
- Preceded by: Mark Hutchison
- Succeeded by: Lisa Cano Burkhead

21st Treasurer of Nevada
- In office January 20, 2007 – January 5, 2015
- Governor: Jim Gibbons; Brian Sandoval
- Preceded by: Brian Krolicki
- Succeeded by: Dan Schwartz

Personal details
- Born: Kathleen Marie Soltero; July 22, 1959 (age 67) San Francisco, California, U.S.
- Party: Democratic
- Spouses: John Marshall (m. 1995; div. 2010) Elliott Parker (m. 2014)
- Children: 2
- Education: University of California, Berkeley (BA, JD)

Kathleen Marie Marshall (née Soltero; born July 22, 1959) is an American lawyer and politician who is the Mayor of Reno, Nevada. She previously served as the 35th lieutenant governor of Nevada from 2019 to 2021. She is a member of the Democratic Party and was previously the Nevada state treasurer. She was ineligible to run for a third term as treasurer in 2014 due to lifetime term limits established by the Nevada Constitution. She unsuccessfully ran for Nevada secretary of state in 2014. In 2018, she was elected lieutenant governor. She resigned as lieutenant governor on September 17, 2021 to join the Biden administration's White House Office of Intergovernmental Affairs.

Marshall was elected mayor of Reno in the 2026 Reno mayoral election, and succeeded incumbent mayor Hillary Schieve, who was term-limited. Marshall was sworn in as Mayor on November 13, 2026.

== Early life and education ==
Marshall was born in San Francisco, one of six siblings, with her father's roots in Mexico and her mother's in Ireland. She graduated from the University of California, Berkeley in 1982 with a Bachelor of Arts degree in political science and English. After graduation, she served in Kenya as a member of the Peace Corps. She also interned for U.S. Senator Paul Laxalt's law firm. She went on to graduate from the UC Berkeley School of Law in 1990.

== Career ==
After graduation, Marshall served in the United States Department of Justice, where she received the Antitrust Division's Outstanding Contribution Award for service.

In 1997, Marshall moved to Nevada.

Her career in public service continued as the senior deputy attorney general for the state of Nevada under Attorney General Frankie Sue Del Papa, where she created Nevada’s Antitrust Unit.

=== Treasurer of Nevada ===
Marshall served as treasurer of Nevada from 2007 through 2015 and was initially elected in 2006. She won the Democratic nomination with over 65% of the vote and defeated Mark Destefano in the general election by a 47-41 margin. She was elected to a second and final term on November 2, 2010, against Steve Martin with 48% of the vote.

=== 2011 congressional special election ===
On May 4, 2011, Marshall announced that she would be running for the U.S. House in a special election for Nevada's 2nd congressional district.

On September 14, 2011, Marshall was defeated 58% to 36% in the election by Republican nominee Mark Amodei.

=== Lieutenant governor of Nevada ===
On September 18, 2017, Marshall announced her candidacy for lieutenant governor of Nevada. She won the Democratic primary on June 12, 2018, defeating Lauren Hansen 67% to 22%. In the 2018 general election, she defeated Republican state senator Michael Roberson of Henderson. Marshall received 486,200 votes (50.36%) to Roberson's 421,427 votes (43.65%)

Marshall was named a vice-chair of the 2020 Democratic National Convention.

=== Biden administration ===
In August 2021, Marshall announced her intentions to resign from the office as lieutenant governor to take the position of senior advisor to governors in the White House Office of Intergovernmental Affairs. Her resignation became effective on September 17, 2021.

=== Academia ===
Since August 2024, Marshall has been a teaching professor of business law at the University of Nevada, Reno.

=== 2026 Reno mayoral campaign ===
On June 9, 2025, Marshall announced her candidacy for mayor of Reno in the 2026 election, aiming to succeed term-limited incumbent Hillary Schieve. She was the first major candidate to enter the race.

== Electoral history ==
Nevada State Treasurer election, 2006
Party	Candidate	Votes	%
Democratic	Kate Marshall	271,088	47.2
Republican	Mark Destefano	239,072	41.6
Independent American	Mark Andrews	35,902	6.2
None of These Candidates		27,527	4.8
Total votes		573,589	100.0
Democratic gain from Republican			

Nevada State Treasurer election, 2010
Party	Candidate	Votes	%
Democratic	Kate Marshall (incumbent)	338,588	48.3
Republican	Steven E. Martin	307,115	43.8
Independent American	Mike Hawkins	28,376	4.1
None of These Candidates		26,837	3.8
Total votes		700,916	100.0
Democratic hold			

Nevada lieutenant gubernatorial election, 2018
Party	Candidate	Votes	%
Democratic	Kate Marshall	486,381	50.35
Republican	Michael Roberson	421,697	43.66
Independent American	Janine Hansen	23,893	2.47
None of These Candidates		23,537	2.44
Independent	Ed Uehling	10,435	1.08
Total votes		965,943	100.0
Democratic gain from Republican			

== Personal life ==
Marshall is married to Elliott Parker, an economist at the University of Nevada, Reno. She has two children.

Political offices
Preceded by Brian Krolicki	Treasurer of Nevada; 2007–2015	Succeeded by Dan Schwartz
Preceded by Mark Hutchison	Lieutenant Governor of Nevada; 2019–2021	Succeeded by Lisa Cano Burkhead
Party political offices
Preceded by Lucy Flores	Democratic nominee for Lieutenant Governor of Nevada; 2018	Succeeded by Lisa Cano Burkhead
