= Geoffrey Griffin =

Geoffrey Griffin or Geoff Griffin may refer to:

- Geoffrey William Griffin, Kenyan educator, founding director of Starehe Boys Centre and School
- Geoff Griffin (1939–2006), South African cricketer
- Jeff Griffin, American football player
- Jeff Griffin (politician) (1944/1945–2026), Reno mayor
- Jefferson Griffin, North Carolina Court of Appeals judge
- Geoffrey "Jeff" Griffin, a fictional character from the 1976 film Griffin and Phoenix, portrayed by Peter Falk
