= List of mayors of Reno, Nevada =

Mayors of the city of Reno, Nevada, USA

The following is a list of mayors of the city of Reno, Nevada, United States.

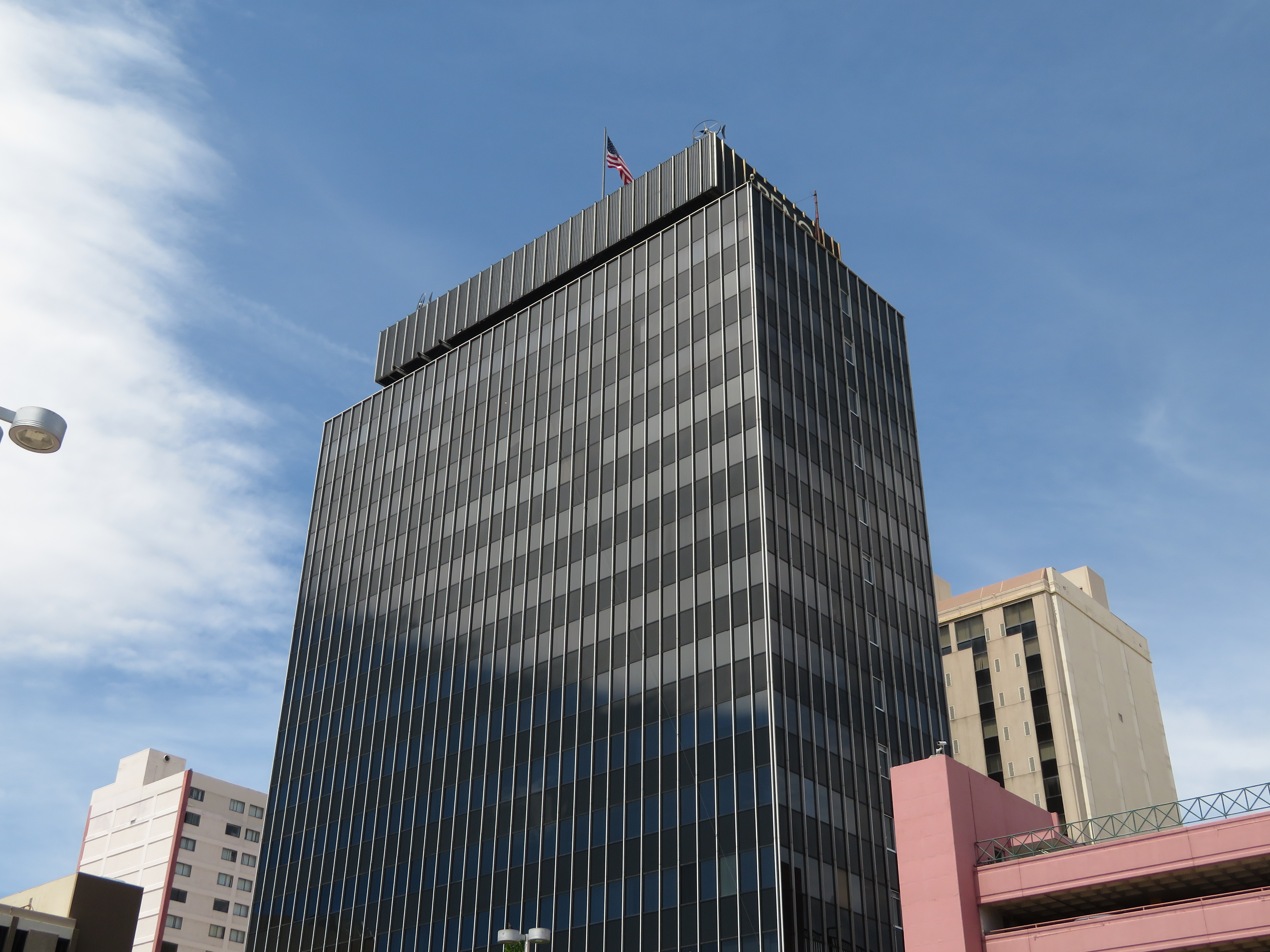
Reno City Hall building in Nevada, US, in 2020

== Mayors ==
The individuals who have served as mayor of Reno include:

1. Ralph S. Osbourn, 1903
2. George Turritin, 1903–1905
3. Daniel W. O'Connor, 1905–1906
4. Nathaniel Estes Wilson, 1906–1907
5. Richard Kirman Sr., 1907–1909
6. Arthur Merrill Britt, 1909–1911
7. Robert C. Turritin, 1911–1913
8. Fred J. Shair, 1913–1915
9. Frank J. Byington, 1915–1919
10. Harry E. Stewart, 1919–1923
11. Edwin E. Roberts, 1923–1933
12. Samuel Frank (acting), 1933–1935
13. John A. Cooper, 1935–1939
14. August C. Frohlich, 1939–1943
15. Harry E. Stewart, 1943–1947 (second term)
16. Francis R. Smith, 1947–1955
17. Len Harris, 1955–1959
18. Bud Baker, 1959–1963
19. Hugo M. Quilici, 1963–1966
20. Roy Bankofier, 1966–1971
21. John E. Chism, 1971–1973
22. Sam Dibitonto, 1973–1975
23. Carl F. Bogart, 1975–1977
24. Bruno Menicucci, 1977–1979
25. Barbara Bennett, 1979–1981
26. Pete Sferrazza, 1981–1995
27. Jeff Griffin, 1995–2002
28. Bob Cashell, 2002–2014
29. Hillary Schieve, 2014–2026
30. Kate Marshall, 2026–

== See also ==
- 2014 Reno mayoral election
- 2018 Reno mayoral election
- 2022 Reno mayoral election
- Reno history
- Timeline of Reno, Nevada
