= Jeff Griffin (politician) =

American politician (1944/1945–2026)

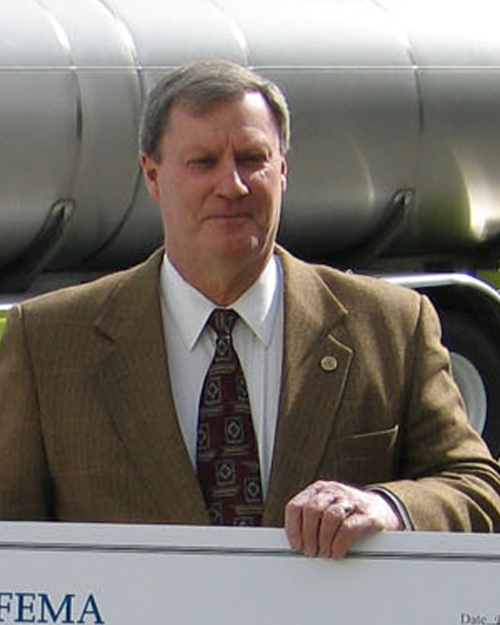

26th Mayor of Reno
- In office June 13, 1995 – November 12, 2002
- Preceded by: Pete Sferrazza
- Succeeded by: Bob Cashell

Personal details
- Born: Gerald Griffin; 1944 or 1945
- Died: February 5, 2026 (aged 81)
- Profession: Businessman, politician

Gerald "Jeff" Griffin (1944 or 1945 – February 5, 2026) was an American businessman and politician. He served as the mayor of Reno, Nevada from 1995 to 2002. During his tenure as mayor, he chaired the Criminal and Social Justice committee of the United States Conference of Mayors, and was the president of the Nevada World Trade Council. He was known for the removal of Reno's historic downtown railroad tracks and as a progenitor of Artown and the Veteran's Day Parade. Before his election, he was a member of the Board of Directors at Truckee Meadows Community College. After serving his term, he acted as the Regional 9 director of FEMA. In 2018, he was awarded the Reno People Award by the city.

== Controversies ==
In 1998, Griffin stated that the Mapes Hotel, a significant structure in the history of Reno, would not be demolished following an agreement with development companies. The plan failed due to projected costs, leading to the hotel's demolition and protests against him.

In a complaint to the Nevada Commission on Ethics by an activist in 2001, Phil Keene, Griffin's tourism chief, was alleged to have used credit cards issued by the Reno-Sparks Convention and Visitors Authority for personal expenses. Following a response by Keene that Griffin had authorized the charges, a new complaint was filed by the activist, naming Griffin.

== Personal life ==
Griffin previously served in the United States Air Force. He owned his own company, Griffin Transport Services, previously known as Mountain Air Delivery.

He died of cancer on February 5, 2026, after being diagnosed with it a year prior, on July 4, 2025. He was survived by his wife Marna, his daughter Sarah, his son and daughter in law Josh and Darla, and eight grandchildren.

== See also ==
- List of mayors of Reno, Nevada
