= Bourbon Square Casino =

Defunct hotel and casino in Nevada, United States

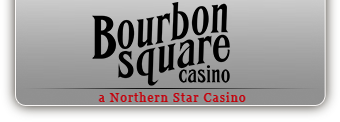

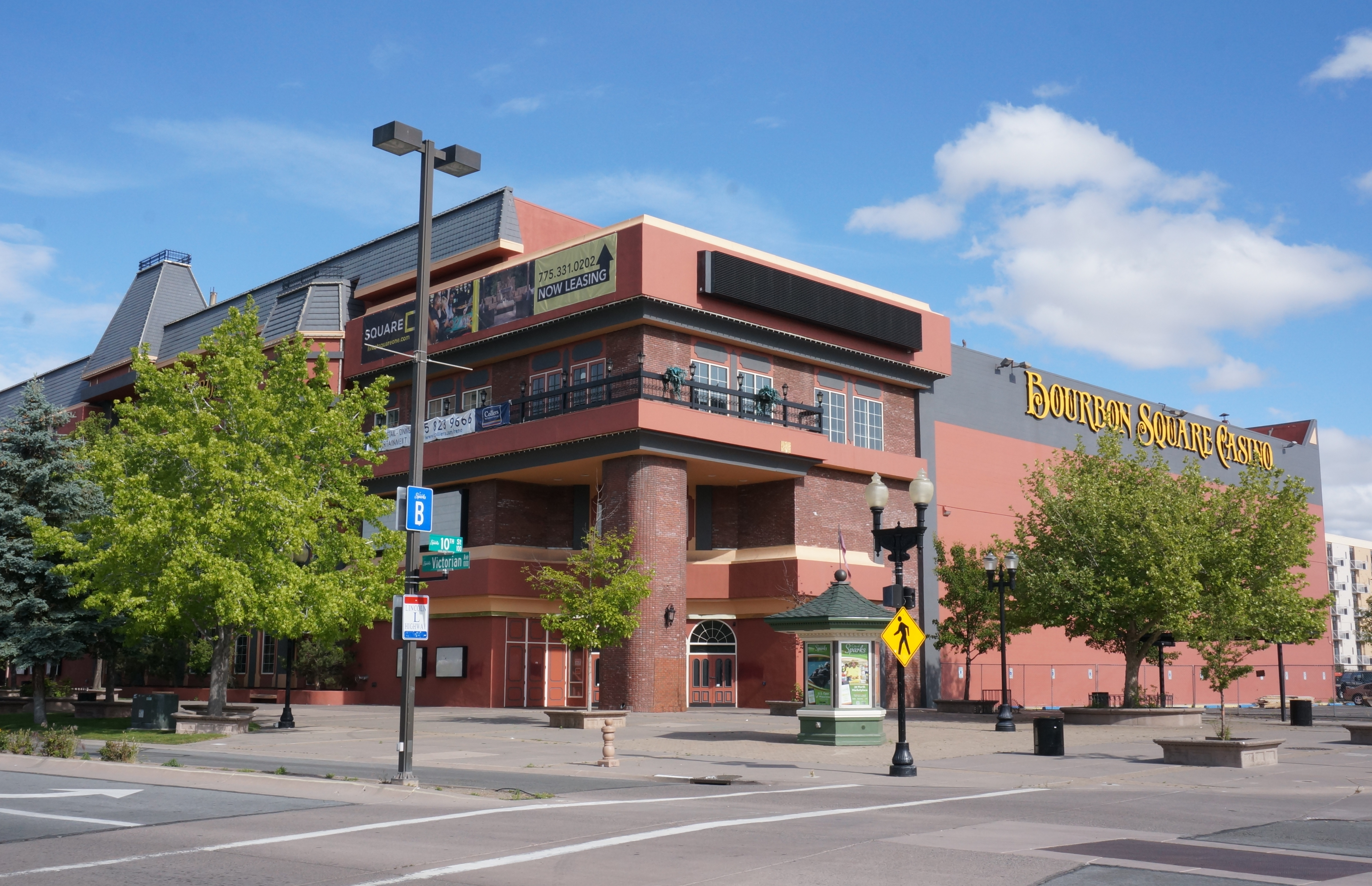
- Bourbon Square in 2016
- Interactive map of Bourbon Square Casino
- Location: Sparks, Nevada, U.S.; 1040 Victorian Avenue; 39.535102°N 119.756352°W
- Opened: c.1961; 65 years ago
- Closed: February 5, 2015; 11 years ago
- Theme: New Orleans
- Gaming space: 15,776 sq ft (1,465.6 m^{2})
- Owner: Northern Star Casinos
- Architect: Worth Group
- Previous names: Sparks Silver Club (1964–67); Karl's Silver Club (1967–84); Karl's Hotel and Casino (1984 onward); Silver Club (until 2009); Bourbon Street Casino (2013, unused)
- Renovated in: 2013
- Website: Official website

Bourbon Square Casino (formerly Silver Club and Bourbon Street Casino) was a casino and former hotel in Downtown Sparks, Nevada, United States. The property operated until January 11, 2009, as Silver Club. The property reopened as Bourbon Square on August 1, 2013, and operated until February 5, 2015. It was demolished in 2018.

== History ==
As of 1961, the property operated as Danny & Don's Bar. In 1964, it was renamed as Sparks Silver Club. As of 1965, the casino was operated by Phair Corporation, and was owned by Ben H. Coleman and Arthur Oetjen with 30 percent ownership each, and Lyndon E. Short with 40 percent. That year, a man filed a complaint against Sparks Silver Club, alleging the casino denied paying him $10,000 after he won a keno game the previous October. The casino believed that cheating was involved in the man's win. The Nevada Gaming Control Board requested the Nevada Gaming Commission to suspend or revoke the casino's gaming license over its refusal to pay the $10,000. In June 1965, the gaming commission voted 4–1 to deny the request, allowing the casino to continue operations. Karl Berge, who would become the paternal grandfather of future actress Jena Malone, purchased the casino in 1967.

In January 1980, Berge had tentative plans for a five-story, 200-room hotel to be built on a 0.89-acre site behind the casino, known then as Karl's Silver Club. Sparks city planners as well as some nearby residents were concerned about parking and traffic in the area following the opening of the hotel, so the project was redesigned to include nearly twice as many parking spaces. The Sparks City Council approved plans for an eight-floor, 209-room hotel in May 1980, with construction expected to begin two months later. The hotel would cost between $3.8 million and $4.8 million. The hotel was to be built in a terraced stair-step shape rising away from residential houses to avoid casting shadows on them. In September 1980, the city approved redesigned plans to build the hotel in a vertical and conventional shape, allowing for lower construction costs. The redesigned hotel would include 235 rooms. It was designed by Fred Dolven, who said the original design would have caused the project to run 40 percent over initial estimates.

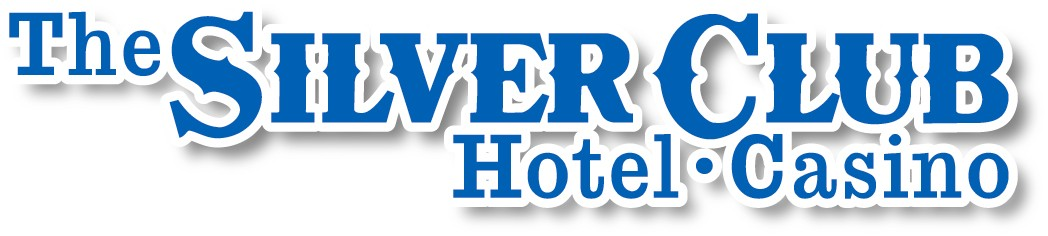
Silver Club logo

Groundbreaking for the hotel took place on July 1, 1981, with completion expected by March 1982. Walker Boudwin Construction Co. was the general contractor for the $3.5 million, contemporary style hotel, which would be four stories tall and include 130 rooms. It was designed with the potential to add two additional floors in the future. The hotel would allow Karl's Silver Club to expand its clientele, which primarily consisted of tour bus customers. In August 1981, the city council unanimously approved Berge's request to increase the hotel to six stories and 206 rooms. The $5.2 million hotel opened in March 1982. The hotel, named Karl's Hotel, held a grand opening ceremony on April 16, 1982. In May 1983, construction began on an $8 million renovation of the casino that would include convention space and new restaurants. The expanded casino project ultimately cost $14 million, and was opened in September 1984, with the property now known as Karl's Hotel and Casino.

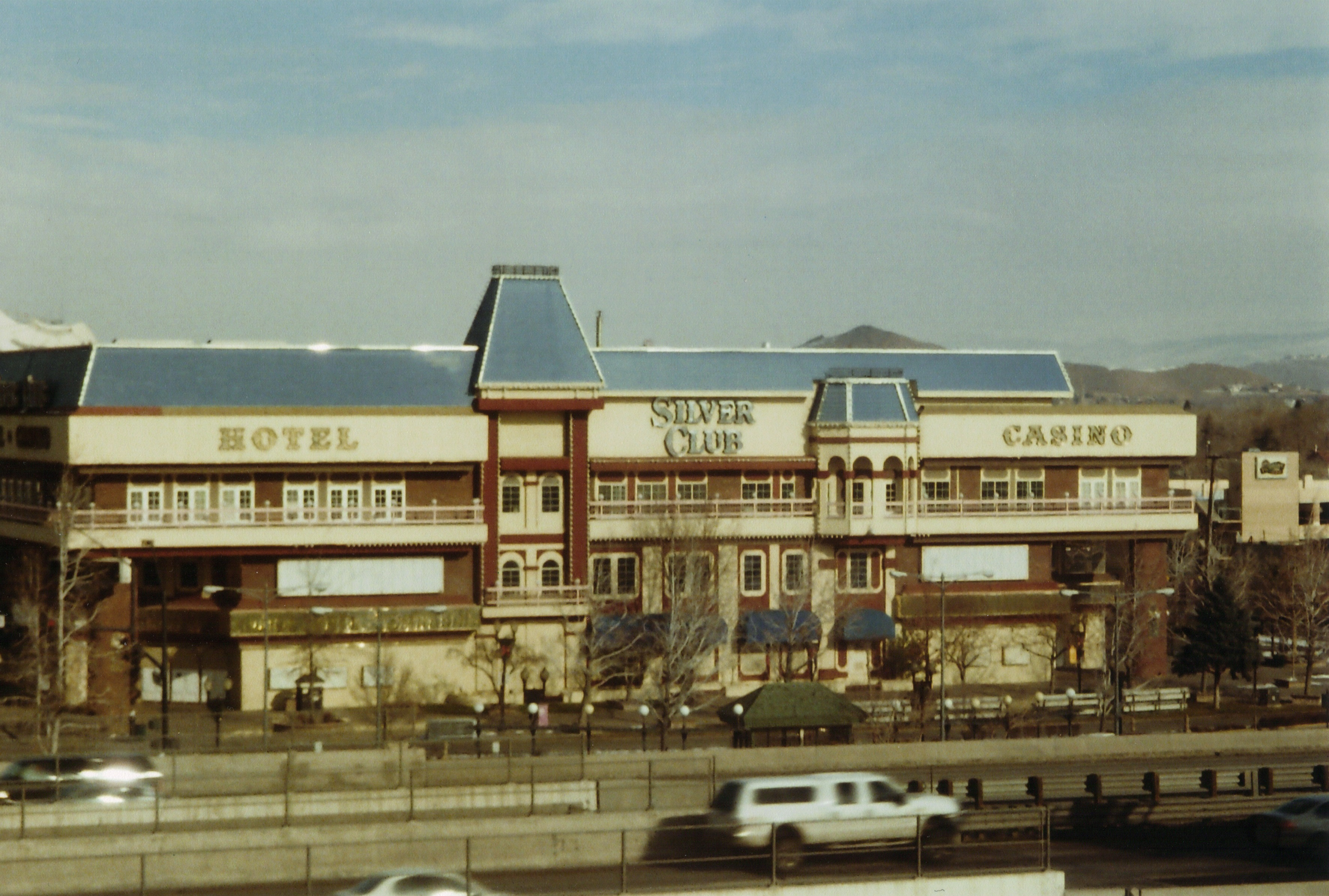
Silver Club in December 2009

The property would later be known as Silver Club. It closed on January 11, 2009. In August 2009, Max Baer Jr., who played Jethro Bodine in The Beverly Hillbillies, began looking into purchasing the property and turning it into Jethro's Beverly Hillbillies Hotel & Casino. Baer has tried to develop a Northern Nevada casino in at least 4 other locations. However, the plan, like his others, never came into fruition.

It reopened as Bourbon Square Casino on August 1, 2013, and continued operating until February 5, 2015. Demolition of Bourbon Square began in November 2018. On May 15, 2019, the Nugget Event Center, an 8,000-seat amphitheater, opened in its former location.
