= Bob Cashell =

American businessman and politician (1938–2020)

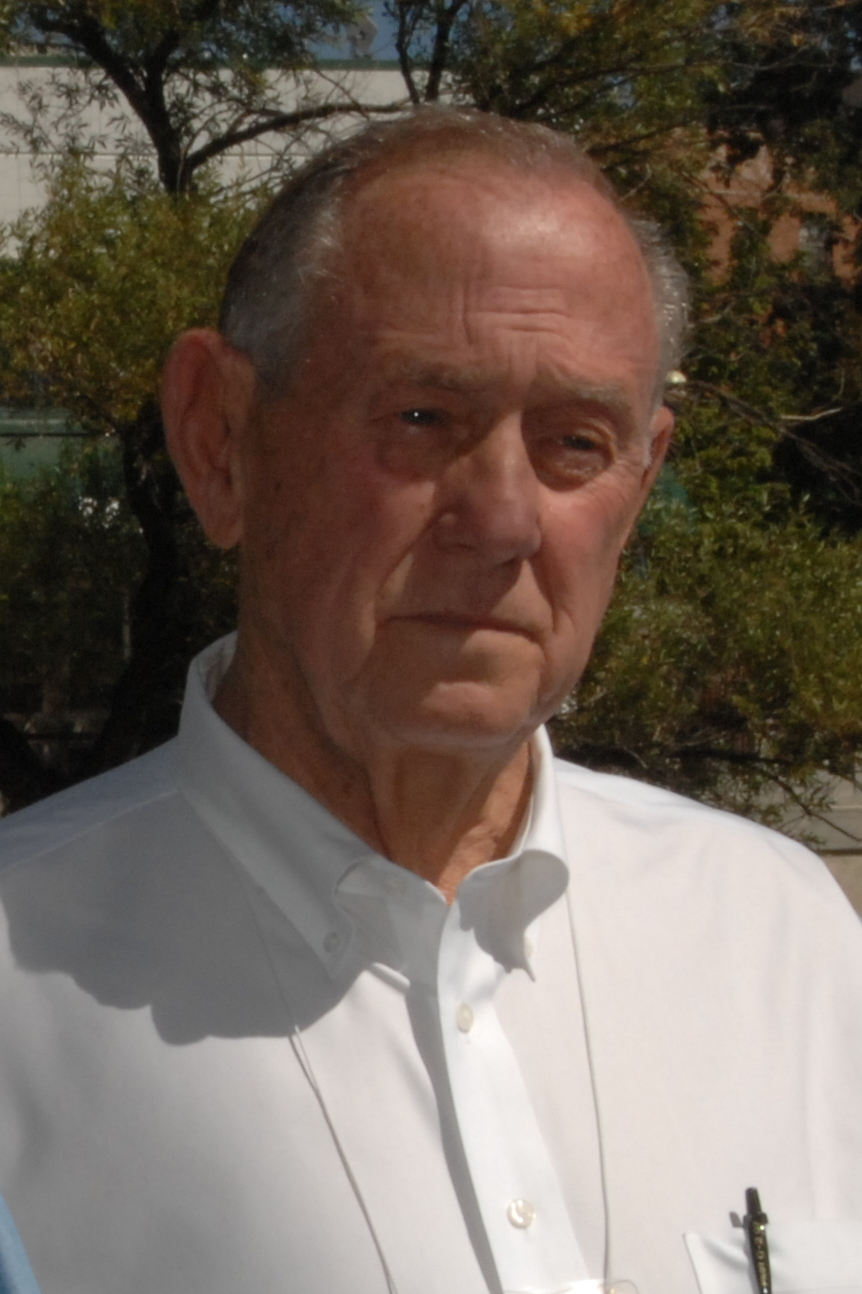

27th Mayor of Reno
- In office November 13, 2002 – November 12, 2014
- Preceded by: Jeff Griffin
- Succeeded by: Hillary Schieve

28th Lieutenant Governor of Nevada
- In office January 3, 1983 – January 5, 1987
- Governor: Richard Bryan
- Preceded by: Myron E. Leavitt
- Succeeded by: Bob Miller

Nevada System of Higher Education Board of Regents
- In office 1979–1982
- Governor: Robert List

Personal details
- Born: Robert Alan Cashell; April 22, 1938 Longview, Texas, U.S.
- Died: February 11, 2020 (aged 81) Reno, Nevada, U.S.
- Resting place: Our Mother of Sorrows Catholic Cemetery; Reno, Nevada, U.S.
- Party: Republican (1983–2020)
- Other political affiliations: Democratic (until 1983)
- Spouse: Nancy Parker (m. 1964)
- Children: 4
- Education: Stephen F. Austin State University
- Profession: Businessman and politician

Military service
- Allegiance: United States
- Branch/service: United States Air Force

Robert Alan Cashell (April 22, 1938 – February 11, 2020) was an American businessman and politician. He served as the mayor of Reno, Nevada from 2002 to 2014. He served as the 28th lieutenant governor of Nevada from 1983 to 1987 and on the Nevada System of Higher Education Board of Regents from 1979 to 1982. He served as a board member for Station Casinos from June 17, 2011 until his death on February 11, 2020. Cashell was a moderate member of the Republican Party and was a former member of the Democratic Party.

== Biography ==
Because of Bob Cashell's large contributions to UNR students, a football team field house at the University of Nevada was constructed, and named after him. Cashell was a prominent businessman, owning Cashell Enterprises, a hotel/casino company. He bought Bill & Effies, a truck stop, in 1967 and renamed it Boomtown Reno. He sold Boomtown in 1988, after turning the property into a casino/resort.

Cashell later managed several Nevada properties including: Karl's Silver Club (now the defunct Bourbon Square Casino) in Sparks, the Bourbon Street Hotel and Casino (now demolished) in Las Vegas, The Ormsby House in Carson City, and the Avi Resort & Casino for the Avi Indian Tribe in Laughlin. He was a partner in several ventures including: Carson Station (now Max Casino) in Carson City, the Comstock Hotel & Casino (now The Residences at Riverwalk Towers) in Reno and the Holiday Casino (now Harrah's) in Las Vegas. He has also owned several properties including: Winners Inn, Star Casino and Model T Truck Stop in Winnemucca and the Alamo Truck Stop in Sparks. His son, Robert Jr., was a partner in the new ownership of the Fitzgeralds Reno in downtown Reno (which is now the Whitney Peak Hotel). Cashell and his family owned and operate Alamo Truck Plaza in Sparks and Topaz Lodge in Gardnerville.

Cashell died on February 11, 2020, at the age of 81, after being at Saint Mary's Regional Medical Center in Downtown Reno due to suffering heart problems and long-term illnesses.

== See also ==
- List of mayors of Reno, Nevada

== Footnotes ==
Kling, Dwayne. The Rise of The Biggest Little City: An Encyclopedic History, 1931–1981. University of Nevada Press (2000)

Political offices
| Preceded by | Nevada System of Higher Education Board of Regents; 1979–1982 | Succeeded by |
| Preceded by Myron E. Leavitt | Lieutenant Governor of Nevada; January 3, 1983 – January 5, 1987 | Succeeded by Bob Miller |
| Preceded by Jeff Griffin | Mayor of Reno; November 13, 2002 – November 12, 2014 | Succeeded by Hillary Schieve |
