= Patrick Williams (Louisiana politician) =

American politician (born 1963)

Member of the Louisiana House of Representatives for District 4
- In office 2008–2016
- Succeeded by: Cedric Glover

Personal details
- Born: 1963 (age 62–63)
- Party: Democratic

Patrick C. Williams (born 1963) is an American politician who served in the Louisiana House of Representatives. Williams endorsed the Hillary Clinton 2016 presidential campaign.
