= Cedric Glover =

American politician

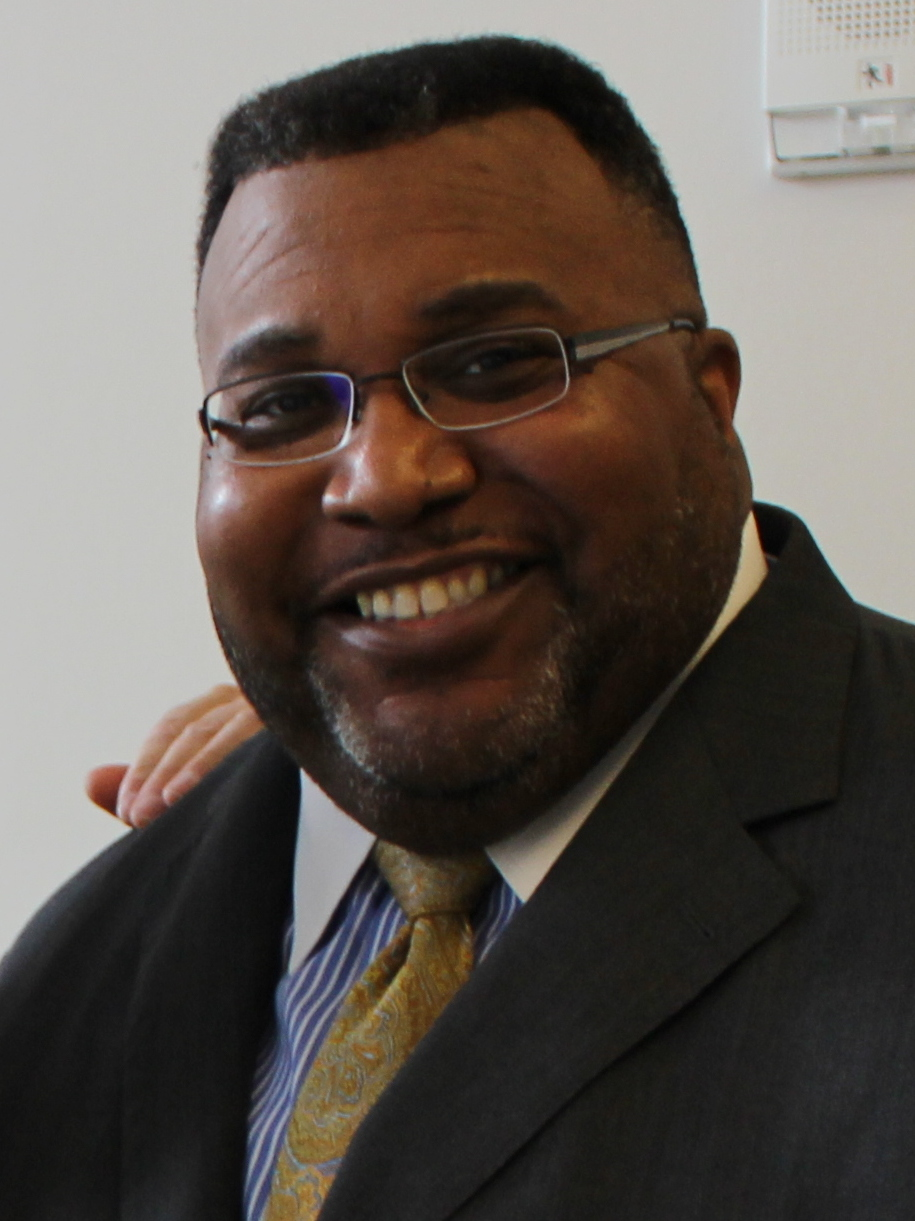

Member of the Louisiana House of Representatives from the 4th district
- Incumbent
- Assumed office January 11, 2016
- Preceded by: Patrick C. Williams
- In office 1996–2006
- Preceded by: C. O. Simpkins, Sr.
- Succeeded by: Patrick C. Williams

Mayor of Shreveport, Louisiana
- In office December 27, 2006 – December 27, 2014
- Preceded by: Keith Hightower
- Succeeded by: Ollie Tyler

Member of the Shreveport City Council District A
- In office 1990–1996
- Succeeded by: Bobby J. Cooper

Personal details
- Born: Cedric Bradford Glover; August 9, 1965 (age 60) Shreveport, Louisiana, U.S.
- Party: Democratic
- Spouse: Veronica S. Glover
- Profession: Business Executive; Insurance agent

Cedric Bradford Glover (born August 9, 1965) is a Democratic Party politician who is a member of the Louisiana House of Representatives, representing District 4. He was earlier the two-term mayor of Shreveport, Louisiana, the first African-American to hold that position.

Outgoing Mayor Keith Hightower was term-limited in 2006, after having won election in both 1998 and 2002. Glover defeated the Republican mayoral candidate, former city attorney Jerry Jones, in the general election held on November 7, 2006, by a 54-46 percent margin. The third-place contender, former broadcast journalist Liz Swaine, had been eliminated in the nonpartisan blanket primary held on September 30. Glover was formerly a member in both the Louisiana House of Representatives (1996–2006) and the Shreveport City Council (1990–1996).

In the primary held on October 2, 2010, Glover sought a second term against seven opponents. He led with 16,376 votes (45 percent), and city council member Bryan Wooley, a Republican, trailed with 11,218 votes (31 percent). In the November 2 general election, Glover handily defeated Wooley, 37,699 votes (64 percent) to 21,021 (36 percent).

== Early life and career ==
Mr. Glover was educated at Caddo Magnet High School and then attended both Grambling State University and Louisiana State University. He became a regional president for Professional Temporaries USA. Mr. Glover was one of Norwela Council’s first In-School Scouting Coordinators while at the same time being Scoutmaster at Boy Scout Troop 333.

== 2008 veto controversy ==
On October 24, 2008, Glover vetoed a pay raise proposal that would have included all law enforcement personnel. This was the first veto the mayor used during his term. The pay raise, backed by a Shreveport City Councilman would use funds re-allocated from the current budget. The proposal had intended to remedy the city's number of law enforcement personnel that were leaving because of low pay and safety issues. Shreveport has a considerably higher crime rate and pays its police officers less than the regional average. The Councilman argued that the proposal was one way to retain more officers, saying: "Officers are leaving at an alarming rate to find better pay somewhere else. Let's keep it in the police department. Let's give the police officers a well deserved-well needed raise and lets make ourselves competitive in the marketplace." Glover responded by saying that the city only loses officers at a rate of 6 percent, which is below the national average of 10 percent.

Four days after the veto, supporters of the proposal failed to override it when the City Council voted in favor of the Mayor's decision. The supporters would have needed at least five votes to override.

== Return to the legislature ==
On January 11, 2016, Glover returned to the state House for a second stint of service, having won outright the position in the primary election held on October 24, 2015. He received 4,136 votes (52.7 percent), having topped two Democratic challengers, Fred Moss IV, and Reginald Johnson.

In May 2016, Representative Glover failed to push through the House Criminal Justice Committee on a six to nine vote his bill to assist those wrongfully convicted and imprisoned to obtain compensation from the state. The legislation was particularly aimed at providing compensation to the surviving family of the late Glenn Ford of Shreveport, an African-American who spent three decades on death row until it was determined that he did not murder Isadore Rozeman, a Shreveport jeweler. Ford had been denied compensation because the court claimed he was still guilty through the planning of the armed robbery that led to Rozeman's murder in 1983. The Louisiana 2nd Circuit Court of Appeals in Shreveport upheld that decision. Roseman's nephew, Dr. Phillip Rozeman of Shreveport, said the only innocent person in the case was his murdered uncle, claiming that Glenn Ford not only planned the crime but also sold stolen items from the jewelry store after the murder. This allegation is refuted by former prosecutor Marty Stroud, who said, "My mistake cost a man 30 years on death row for a crime he didn't commit. The court said he led the effort to invade the house; there's no evidence of that." Ford died of lung cancer in 2015. Glover said that he will re-introduce his legislation in 2017.

== See also ==
- List of first African-American mayors

Political offices
Preceded by Keith Hightower	Mayor of Shreveport, Louisiana; 2006–2014	Succeeded by Ollie Tyler
Preceded by C. O. Simpkins, Sr.	Louisiana State Representative for District 4 (Caddo Parish); 1996–2006	Succeeded by Patrick C. Williams
Preceded by Patrick C. Williams	Louisiana State Representative for District 4 (Caddo Parish); 2016–	Succeeded by Incumbent
