= 2018 Reno mayoral election =

- November 6, 2018
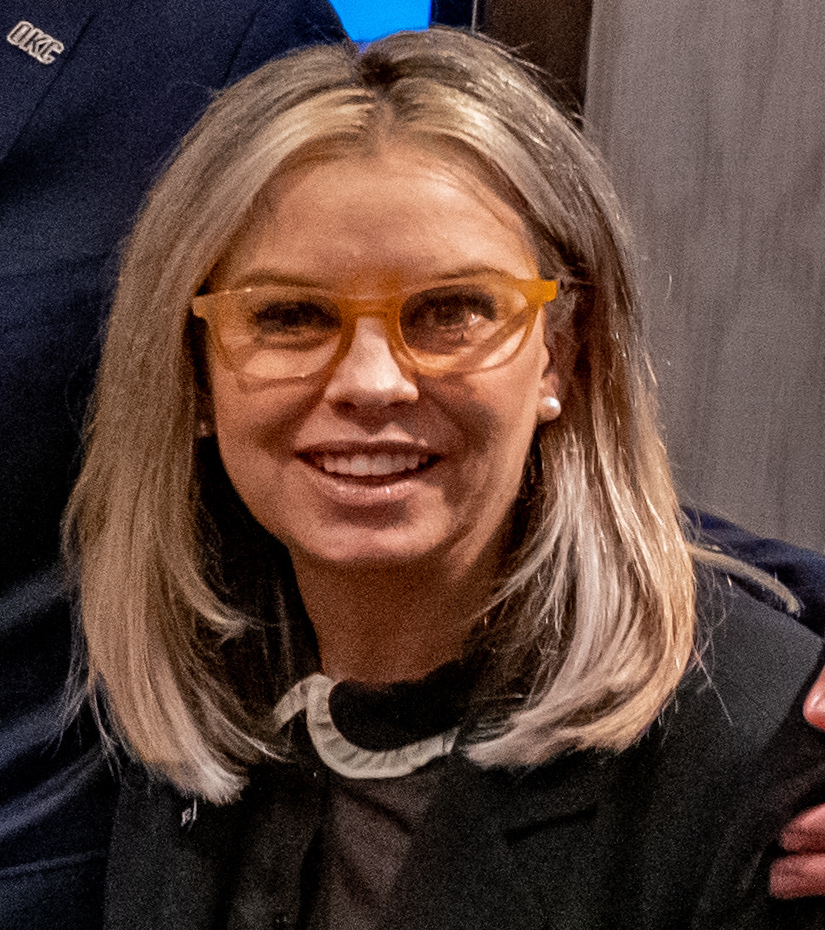

Candidate	Hillary Schieve	Eddie Lorton
Popular vote	57,580	31,684
Percentage	64.51%	35.49%
Mayor before election
Hillary Schieve
Elected mayor
Hillary Schieve

An election was held on November 6, 2018, to elect the mayor of Reno, Nevada. It saw the reelection of Hillary Schieve.

== Results ==
=== Primary ===
The primary was held June 12.

Primary results
Candidate	Votes	%
Hillary Schieve (incumbent)	20,991	62.94
Eddie Lorton	6,084	18.24
Azzi Shirazi	1,584	4.75
William Mantle	1,517	4.55
Michael Hagen	1,217	3.65
John Coristine	822	2.46
Chad Dehne	754	2.26
Jesse O. Razo	380	1.14
Total votes	33,349	

=== General election ===
General election results
Candidate	Votes	%
Hillary Schieve (incumbent)	57,580	64.51
Eddie Lorton	31,684	35.49

== See also ==
- List of mayors of Reno, Nevada
