= Hillary Schieve =

American politician (born 1970)

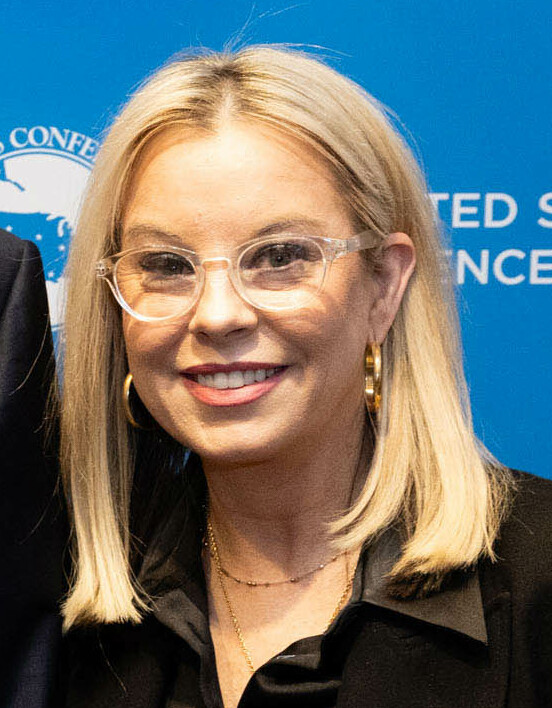
- Schieve in 2024

Mayor of Reno
- In office November 12, 2014 – November 13, 2026
- Preceded by: Bob Cashell

President of the United States Conference of Mayors
- In office 2023–2024
- Preceded by: Francis Suarez
- Succeeded by: Andrew Ginther

Member of the Reno City Council from the at-large district
- In office November 14, 2012 – November 12, 2014
- Preceded by: Pierre Hascheff
- Succeeded by: David Bobzien

Personal details
- Born: Hillary Louise Schieve; October 12, 1970 (age 56) Reno, Nevada, U.S.
- Party: Independent (2006–present)

Hillary Louise Schieve (born October 12, 1970) is an American businesswoman and politician from the U.S. state of Nevada. She became the mayor of Reno, Nevada in 2014 and is not affiliated with any of the political parties in the United States. She previously was the 81st President of the United States Conference of Mayors, the first president who was an independent politician.

== Career ==
Schieve was on the Reno City Council from 2012 to 2014. Schieve was one of 20 candidates on the primary ballot in 2014. She ultimately ran for mayor in 2014 and beat her opponent, Raymond "Pez" Pezonella, a Democrat, 60.90% to 39.10% in the Washoe County election. She was elected to the position of City of Reno Mayor on November 4, 2014, and sworn in eight days later. Although the mayor's office is a non-partisan position, she received support from the Democratic Party prior to winning the mayoral election.

On August 25, 2016, Schieve endorsed Hillary Clinton for president in 2016 in the general election after Schieve declined to endorse candidates in the primary.

Schieve was named by Politico as one of the 11 most interesting mayors in America, citing her work to revitalize the Midtown District of Reno and continued efforts to promote affordable housing, mental health services, and the fight against homelessness.

Schieve ran for re-election in 2022 for a third and final term due to term limits and was not affected by the court ruling regarding the elections for the city council and mayor by the Nevada Supreme Court.

== Controversies ==
=== American flag replaced with an LGBT flag ===
Schieve apologized for the replacement of the American flag with the LGBT rainbow flag on the Reno City Hall skyscraper building on July 27, 2015.

=== Excessive taxpayer spending ===
Schieve defended the taxpayer expenses of more than $10,000 on the State of the City address on March 9, 2017, after being criticized for wasteful spending.

=== Amending powers of Mayor in Reno City Charter ===
Schieve convinced Democratic state senator Tick Segerblom of Las Vegas to introduce an amendment to the city charter granting "Strong Mayor" powers common in other cities across the state and country. This amendment would have made the Mayor the helm of the Executive branch by creating a separate office and allow the Mayor to veto matters passed by the Reno City Council (with the Council power to override a veto) and to break tie votes. Despite a similar Charter amendment adopted by the cities of Sparks and Mesquite, as well as a power common to the incorporated general law cities of Nevada, the amendment was withdrawn amid criticism, such as that the amendment was introduced without consulting the charter committee. Critics (including Washoe County Democrats, Republicans of all 17 counties and others) have condemned the bill as a power grab by Schieve herself and for abusing multiple taxpayers' money accounts. The bill was rejected by the state assembly after it was passed by the state senate and was later withdrawn.

== Personal life ==
Schieve attended Washoe High School. She owned two clothing stores. She became an advocate for organ donor awareness after her sister, former KOLO-TV news anchor Amanda Sanchez, donated a kidney to her.

== See also ==
- 2018 Reno mayoral election
- List of mayors of Reno, Nevada

Political offices
Preceded by Bob Cashell	Mayor of Reno; 2014–present	Incumbent
